= Brooke Lierman =

American politician (born 1979)

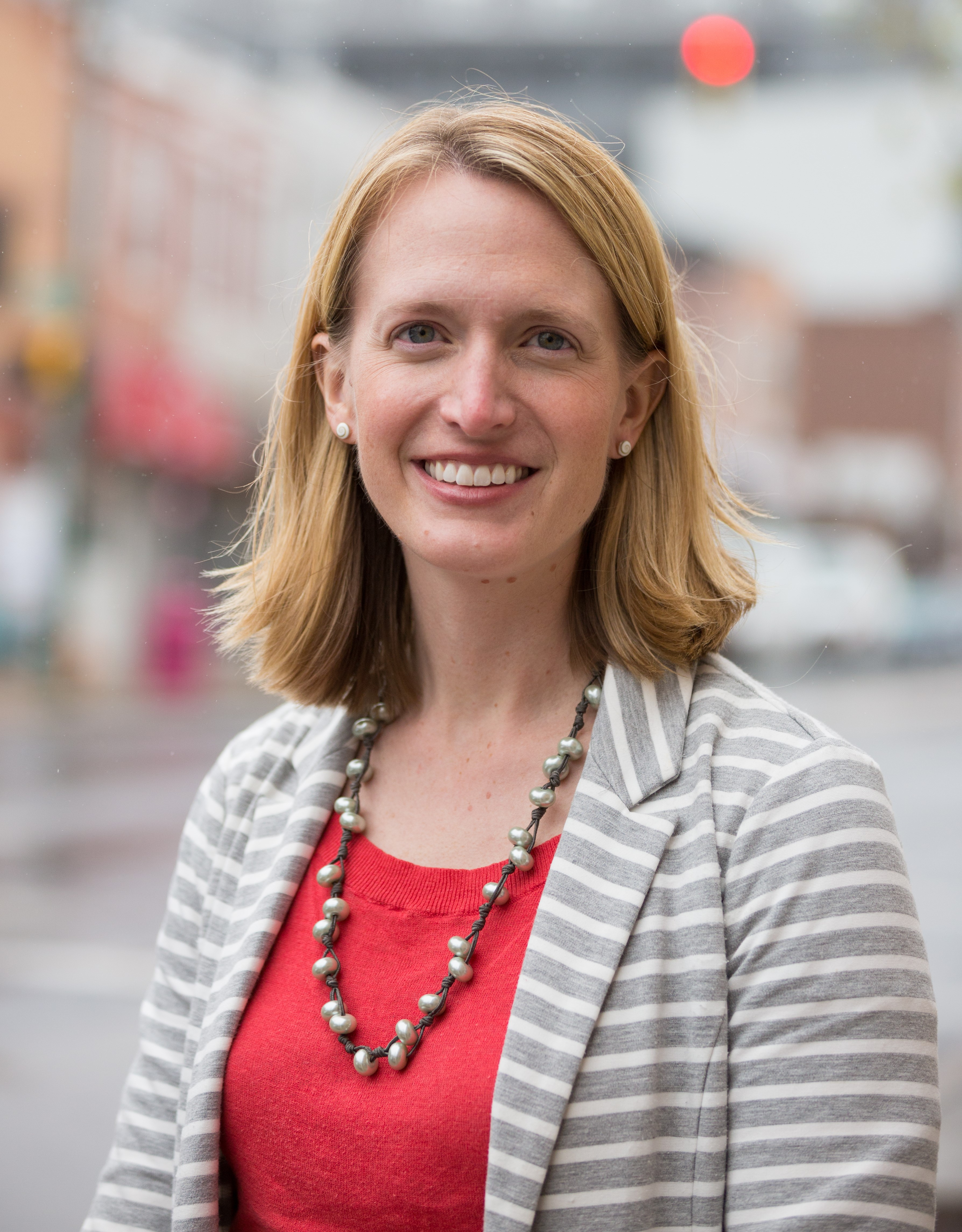

34th Comptroller of Maryland
- Incumbent
- Assumed office January 16, 2023
- Governor: Larry Hogan; Wes Moore
- Preceded by: Peter Franchot

Member of the Maryland House of Delegates from the 46th district
- In office January 14, 2015 – January 11, 2023
- Preceded by: Brian K. McHale
- Succeeded by: Mark Edelson

Personal details
- Born: February 14, 1979 (age 47) Washington, D.C., U.S.
- Party: Democratic
- Spouse: Eben Hansel (m. 2009)
- Children: 2
- Education: Dartmouth College (BA); University of Texas, Austin (JD)
- Lierman's voice Lierman on the importance of ESG disclosures. Recorded July 12, 2023

Brooke Elizabeth Lierman (born February 14, 1979) is an American attorney and politician who has been the 34th comptroller of Maryland since 2023. She is the first woman to hold the position. A member of the Democratic Party, Lierman was a member of the Maryland House of Delegates, representing District 46 in Baltimore from 2015 to 2023.

Born in Washington, D.C., and raised in Montgomery County, Maryland, Lierman graduated from Dartmouth College and the University of Texas School of Law. She began her career clerking for U.S. District Court judges Benson Everett Legg and Deborah K. Chasanow before becoming a civil rights attorney for the Brown, Goldstein, & Levy law firm. She was elected to the Maryland House of Delegates in 2014 and 2018. Lierman was elected comptroller of Maryland in 2022, defeating Harford County executive Barry Glassman in the general election.

== Life and career ==
Lierman was born in Washington, D.C., on February 14, 1979, to father Terry Lierman, who served as the chair of the Maryland Democratic Party from 2004 to 2007. She graduated from Walt Whitman High School in Bethesda, Maryland, in 1997. Lierman attended Dartmouth College, where she earned an A.B. degree in history in 2001. She later attended the University of Texas School of Law, where she earned a J.D. degree and graduated cum laude in 2008. Between college and law schools, Lierman was an AmeriCorps VISTA member at The DREAM Program in Vermont, working with children living in public housing developments.

Lierman is a counsel for the Baltimore civil rights firm Brown, Goldstein, & Levy LLP, where she handles a variety of civil rights and disability rights cases. She is also a trustee of the Baltimore Museum of Art and on the board of Advocates for Children and Youth and the Downtown Partnership of Baltimore.

== Political career ==
Lierman first got involved in politics by working on the 2002 campaign of U.S. Senator Paul Wellstone, and on the presidential campaign of Howard Dean and John Kerry. Prior to going to law school, Lierman worked at the Center for American Progress in Washington, D.C. While at law school, Lierman was President of the American Constitution Society and worked as a policy advisor to Texas state senator Rodney Ellis. Lierman clerked for Judge Benson Everett Legg and Judge Deborah K. Chasanow, both Chief Judges of the federal District Court of Maryland, from 2009 to 2010.

In July 2013, Lierman announced her candidacy for the Maryland House of Delegates in District 46. She won the Democratic primary, receiving 28.1 percent of the vote and filling the seat left by retiring Delegate Brian K. McHale.

=== Maryland House of Delegates ===
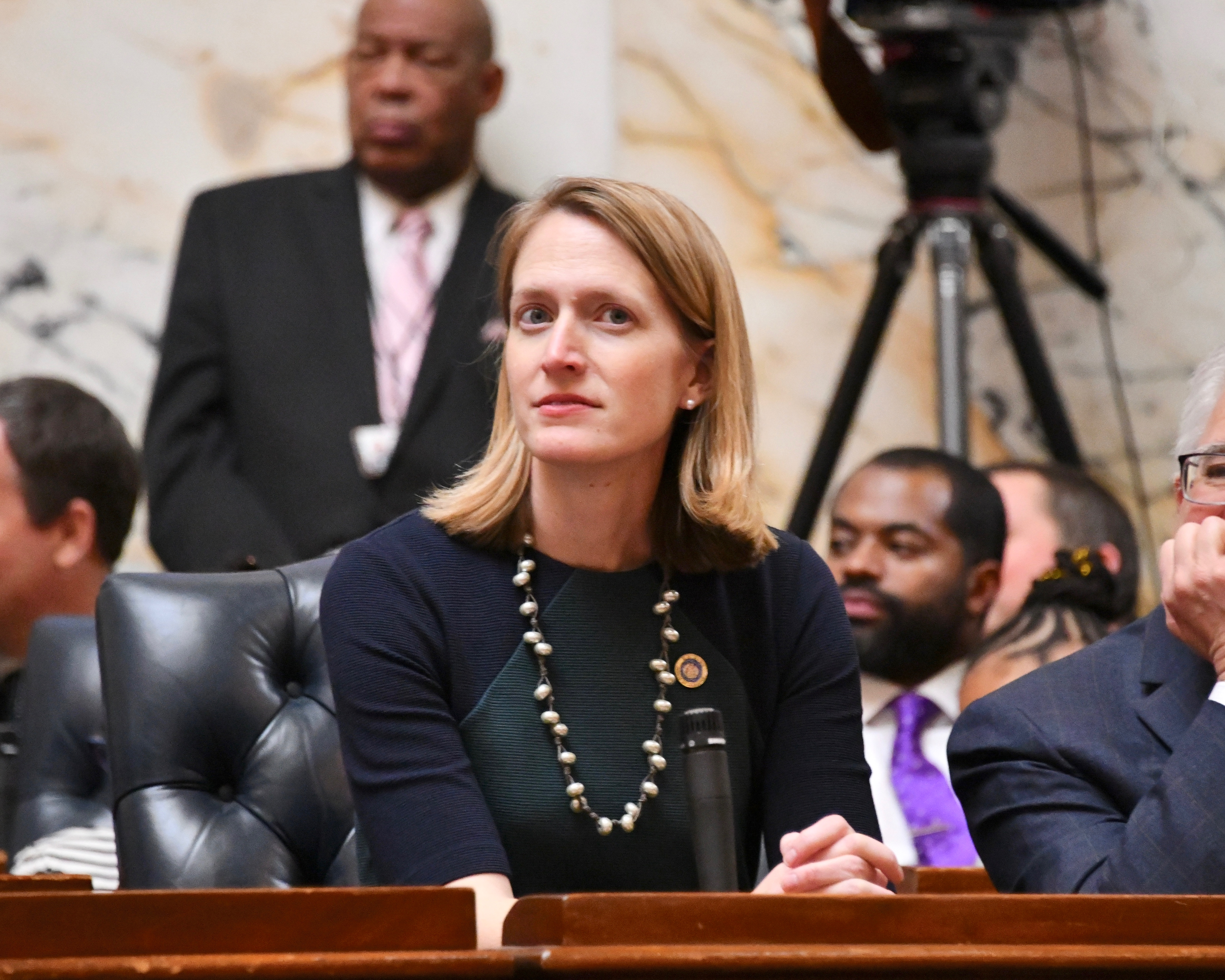
Lierman in the Maryland House of Delegates, 2020

Lierman was sworn in as a member of the House of Delegates on January 14, 2015. She was a member of the Appropriations Committee from 2015 to 2019, afterwards serving on the Environment and Transportation Committee until 2023. She was also a member of the Women Legislators of Maryland and a co-chair of the Maryland Legislative Transit Caucus.

In 2016, Lierman filed to run as a Delegate to the Democratic National Convention, representing Hillary Clinton. She received 14.5 percent of the vote in the Democratic primary election, coming in third in a field of nine candidates. Shortly after the election of President Donald Trump in November 2016, Lierman organized Baltimore Women United, a coalition of female volunteers and activists. During the 2020 United States presidential election, she co-founded and co-chaired the Maryland Women for Biden organization.

In August 2018, Lierman organized a protest against the opening of a campaign office for Larry Hogan in Baltimore City, highlighting his opposition of the Red Line and handling of the State Center station redevelopment project.

=== Comptroller of Maryland ===
==== Elections ====
===== 2022 =====
In August 2020, Maryland Matters reported that Lierman had been aggressively contacting party activists and influencers about a potential run for Comptroller. On December 17, 2020, Lierman announced her candidacy for Comptroller of Maryland in the 2022 election, which was being vacated by Peter Franchot, who unsuccessfully ran for governor of Maryland. She received endorsements from various elected officials across the state, including U.S. Representatives Jamie Raskin and Steny Hoyer, President of the Maryland Senate Bill Ferguson, Speaker of the Maryland House of Delegates Adrienne A. Jones, Prince George's County Executive Angela Alsobrooks, and former U.S. Senator Barbara Mikulski.

Lierman defeated Bowie mayor Tim Adams in the Democratic primary election on July 19, 2022, receiving 66.2 percent of the vote in the Democratic primary, winning with the highest margin of victory of the highly contested statewide Democratic primaries. She defeated Harford County executive Barry Glassman in the general election on November 8, 2022.

===== 2026 =====
On September 17, 2025, Lierman announced that she would run for re-election for a second term as comptroller. She will face Republican Sonya Dunn in the general election.

==== Tenure ====
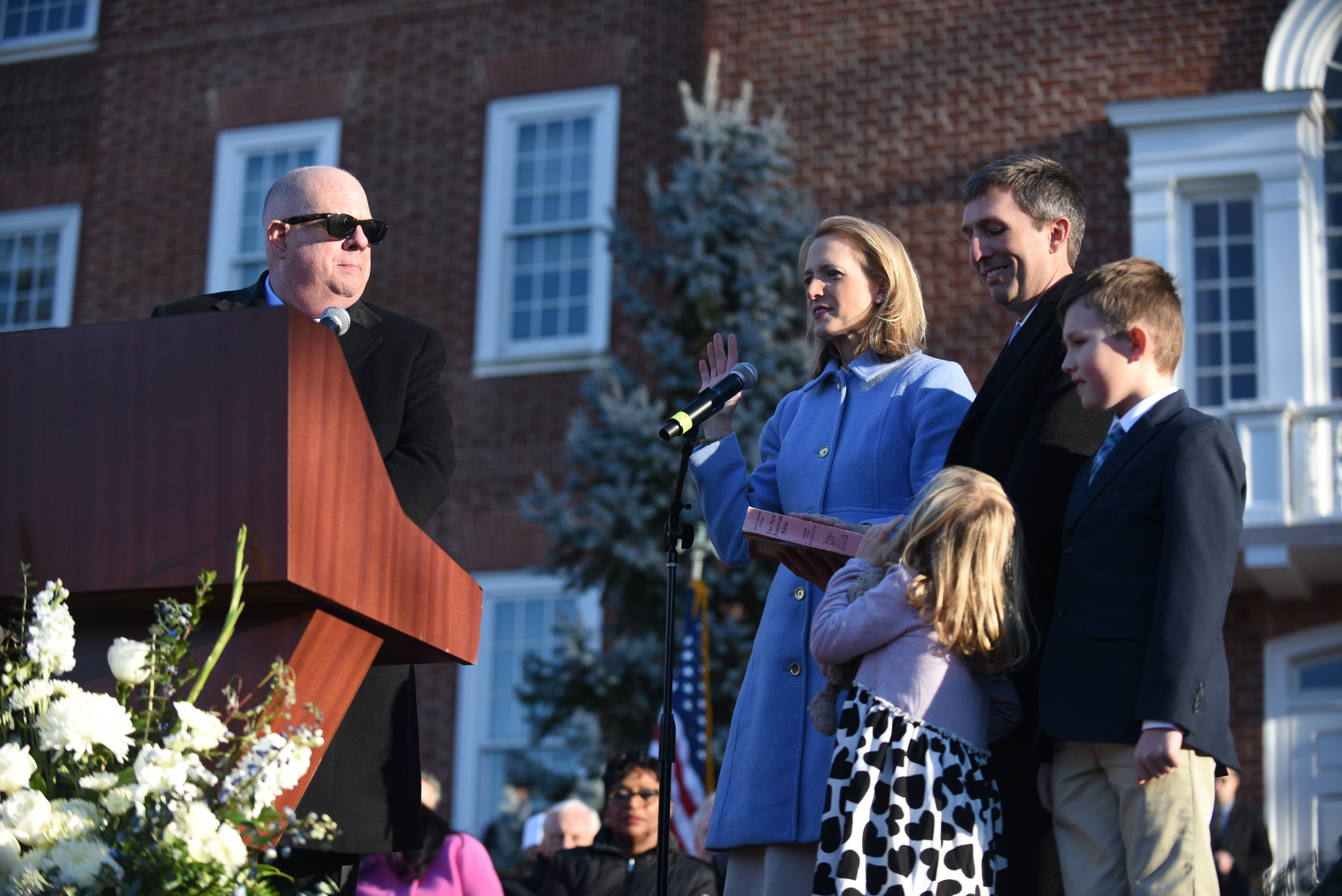
Lierman being sworn in by Governor Larry Hogan.

Lierman was sworn in on January 16, 2023, becoming the first woman to serve as Maryland comptroller and the first woman directly elected by voters to a statewide office in Maryland.

In February 2023, Lierman released a list of legislative priorities for the 2023 legislative session, including creating a chief information officer position to promote modernizing technology in the comptroller's office, increasing transparency and access to the agency, and increasing state contracts offered to diverse businesses. During the 2023 legislative session, legislators passed bills supporting these priorities, including a bill to create a new Taxpayer Advocate Division for the comptroller.

Lierman was an at-large delegate to the 2024 Democratic National Convention, pledged to Kamala Harris. During the 2024 presidential election, she canvassed for Harris in Pennsylvania.

In October 2024, Lierman and Lieutenant Governor Aruna Miller presided over the Maryland Board of Public Works, marking the first time in Maryland history in which only women presided over the meeting.

== Political positions ==
=== Education ===
Lierman supports increasing funding for Baltimore City schools and universal pre-K. During the 2017 legislative session, she introduced a bill that would ban pre-K suspensions and expulsions. The bill passed and became law on May 27, 2017. During the 2019 legislative session, Lierman voted in favor of a bill that would give school districts the right to decide when classes begin and end each year. The bill passed, but was vetoed by Hogan, after which Lierman voted in favor of overriding the gubernatorial veto.

=== Elections ===
Lierman introduced legislation in the 2019 legislative session that would allow ranked choice voting in city elections, as well as open primaries. She later withdrew the bill after talking with her colleagues in the Baltimore House Delegation.

=== Environment ===
During the 2019 legislative session, Lierman introduced legislation that would ban all polystyrene products in Maryland. The bill passed and became law without Governor Hogan's signature on May 28, 2019. The bill was slated to go into effect in July 2020, but its deadline was extended to October amid the COVID-19 pandemic. During the 2020 legislative session, she introduced the Plastics and Packaging Reduction Act, a bill that would ban the sale of plastic bags and require stores to charge a minimum of 10 cents for paper bags. The bill passed the House of Delegates by a vote of 95–37, but was placed on hold amid the COVID-19 pandemic.

During the 2022 legislative session, Lierman introduced a bill that would require the Maryland State Retirement and Pensions System to consider climate change as a financial factor when making investment decisions.

=== Immigration ===
During the 2026 legislative session, Lierman testified in support of a bill to ban counties from entering into 287(g) program agreements with U.S. Immigration and Customs Enforcement, citing the millions of dollars immigrants contribute to the state's economy.

=== Labor ===
During the 2019 legislative session, Lierman introduced legislation that would allow student athletes at public universities to engage in collective bargaining. During the 2021 legislative session, she introduced a bill that would give college athletes the right to profit off their names and likenesses.

In February 2022, Lierman attended a rally encouraging Maryland legislators to pass a bill that would offer paid family leave to all Marylanders. She voted in favor of the Time to Care Act, which provides up to 24 weeks of paid leave per year.

=== Marijuana ===
Lierman supports the legalization of recreational marijuana and says that regulation of the industry should fall under the Alcohol and Tobacco Commission.

=== Social issues ===
During the 2018 legislative session, Lierman introduced a bill that would make it illegal for police officers to have sex with people in custody. The bill passed and became law.

In January 2019, Lierman was one of nine Maryland lawmakers to add their names to a manifesto signed by 326 state legislators to reaffirm their commitment to protecting abortion rights. In March 2022, she spoke in support of legislation that would enshrine the right to abortion in the Maryland State Constitution, recounting being raped while in college and worrying over the thought of what she might do if she became pregnant as a result.

During the 2020 legislative session, Lierman cosponsored a bill that would research providing reparations to the descendants of enslaved Africans in Maryland.

During the 2022 legislative session, Lierman introduced legislation that would require strip clubs and bars on The Block in downtown Baltimore to close by 10 P.M. The legislation was protested by businesses owners, who said that the bill would cripple their livelihoods. The bill was modified to require business owners to record and share videos of activity on The Block, deploy off-duty police officers at peak hours, and incorporate security plans on February 18, 2022, after the group of legislators behind the bill reached a compromise with the owners of clubs on The Block.

In April 2022, amid the Russian invasion of Ukraine, Lierman introduced legislation that would divest Maryland's retirement and pensions systems from Russia.

=== Transportation ===
Lierman supports the Red Line.

During the 2019 legislative session, Lierman introduced a bill that would give counties the ability to prohibit the construction of toll roads, highways, or bridges without the consent of a majority of the affected counties. She also introduced legislation to boost funding for statewide bicycle infrastructure, which passed but was vetoed by Governor Hogan.

During the 2020 legislative session, Lierman introduced a bill that would increase funding for bus and subway maintenance. The bill passed the Maryland House of Delegates by a vote of 95–36. During the 2021 legislative session, Lierman introduced legislation to increase funding for the state's bus and rail budget by $757 million, which passed but was vetoed by Governor Hogan. The Maryland General Assembly voted to override Hogan's veto during its special legislative session in December 2021.

== Personal life ==
Lierman is married to Eben Hansel, a real estate attorney who she had met while they were both students at Dartmouth College. The couple married on September 19, 2009. Together, they have two children and live in Fell's Point, Baltimore. She is Catholic.

== Electoral history ==
Maryland House of Delegates District 46 Democratic Primary Election, 2014
Party	Candidate	Votes	%
Democratic	Brooke Lierman	6,014	28.1
Democratic	Peter Hammen	5,400	25.2
Democratic	Luke Clippinger	5,123	23.9
Democratic	Bill Romani	3,139	14.7
Democratic	Liam F. Davis	1,745	8.1

Maryland House of Delegates District 46 Election, 2014
Party	Candidate	Votes	%
Democratic	Brooke Lierman	13,889	24.6
Democratic	Peter Hammen	13,217	23.4
Democratic	Luke Clippinger	12,680	22.5
Republican	Roger Bedingfield	6,113	10.8
Republican	Joseph Sedtal	5,275	9.4
Republican	Duane Shelton	5,115	9.1
Write-in		117	0.2

Female Delegates to the Democratic National Convention Primary Election, District 3, 2016
Party	Candidate	Votes	%
Democratic	Shelly Hettleman (Clinton)	61,827	14.8
Democratic	Lee Finney (Clinton)	60,602	14.5
Democratic	Brooke Lierman (Clinton)	60,414	14.5
Democratic	Lynn Morrison Venetoulis (Clinton)	58,131	13.9
Democratic	Barbara Friedland (Sanders)	45,299	10.9
Democratic	Joan Taylor (Sanders)	40,821	9.8
Democratic	Mirah Derora Ippolito (Sanders)	39,387	9.4
Democratic	Donna Plamondon (Sanders)	38,511	9.2
Democratic	Cheryl Ann Menke (Uncommitted)	12,223	2.9

Maryland House of Delegates District 46 Election, 2018
Party	Candidate	Votes	%
Democratic	Brooke Lierman	23,711	28.6
Democratic	Luke Clippinger	23,023	27.8
Democratic	Robbyn Lewis	22,582	27.3
Republican	Jeremy Baron	6,879	8.3
Republican	Nicholas Wentworth	6,324	7.6
Write-in		289	0.3

Maryland Comptroller Democratic primary, 2022
Party	Candidate	Votes	%
Democratic	Brooke Lierman	422,815	66.2
Democratic	Tim Adams	215,564	33.8

Maryland Comptroller election, 2022
Party	Candidate	Votes	%	±%
Democratic	Brooke Lierman	1,223,044	61.56	−10.51
Republican	Barry Glassman	761,422	38.33	+10.54
Write-in		2,244	0.11	-0.03
Total votes		1,986,710	100.0	
Democratic hold				

== Notes ==
Party political offices
Preceded by Peter Franchot	Democratic nominee for Comptroller of Maryland; 2022, 2026	Most recent
Political offices
Preceded by Peter Franchot	Comptroller of Maryland; 2023–present	Incumbent
