= 2022 Maryland Comptroller election =

- November 8, 2022
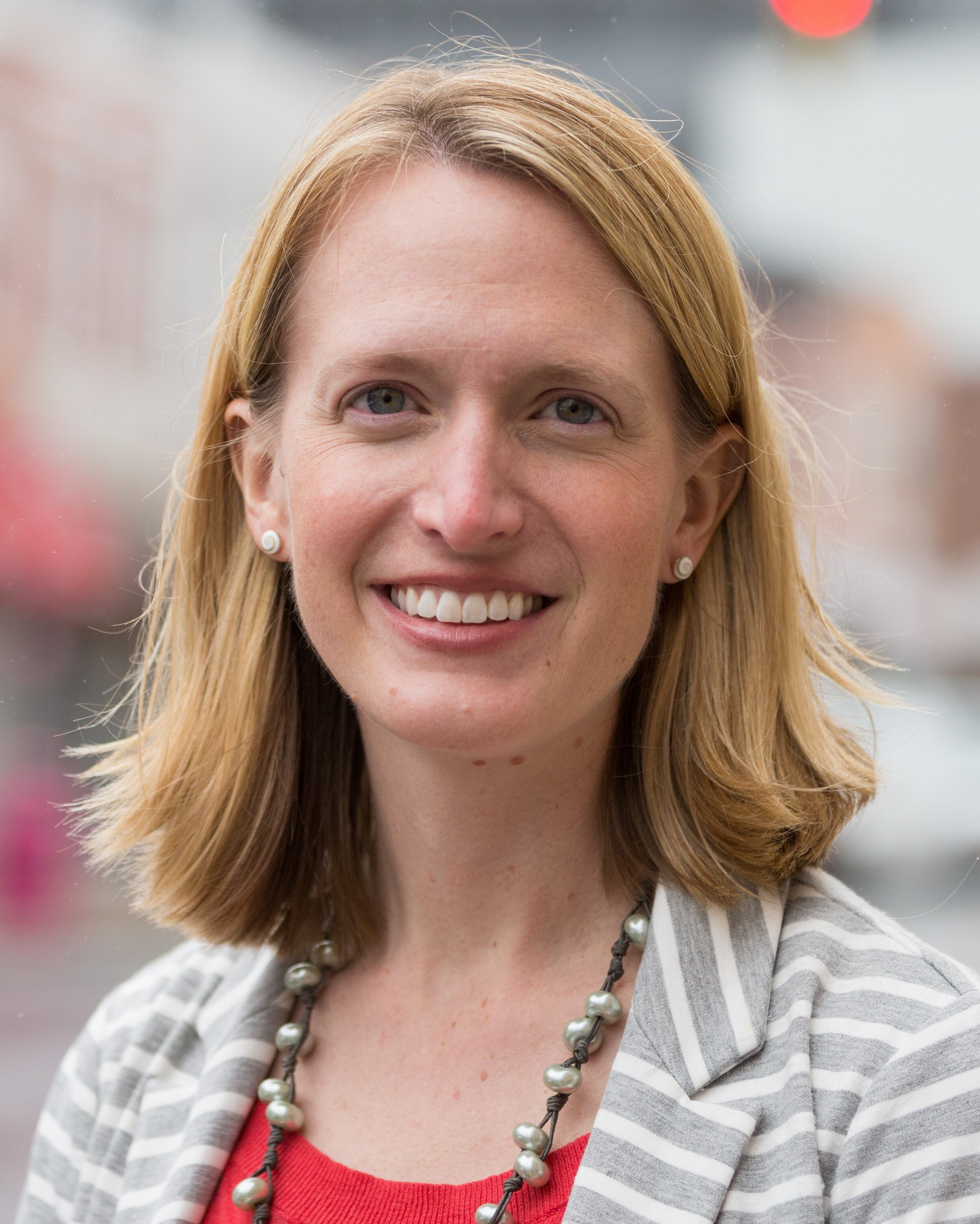

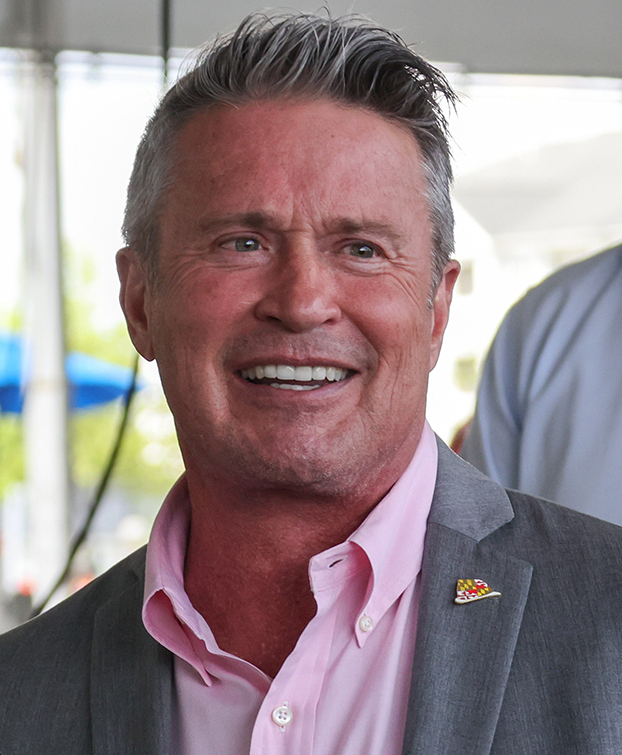
Nominee	Brooke Lierman	Barry Glassman
Party	Democratic	Republican
Popular vote	1,223,044	761,422
Percentage	61.56%	38.33%
- Lierman: 50–60% 60–70% 70–80% 80–90% >90% Glassman: 50–60% 60–70% 70–80% 80–90% >90% Tie: 40–50% 50% No votes
Comptroller before election
Peter Franchot
Democratic
Elected Comptroller
Brooke Lierman
Democratic

The 2022 Maryland Comptroller election was held on November 8, 2022, to elect the next Comptroller of Maryland. Incumbent Democratic Comptroller Peter Franchot declined to run for a fifth term and instead ran unsuccessfully for Governor of Maryland.

== Democratic primary ==
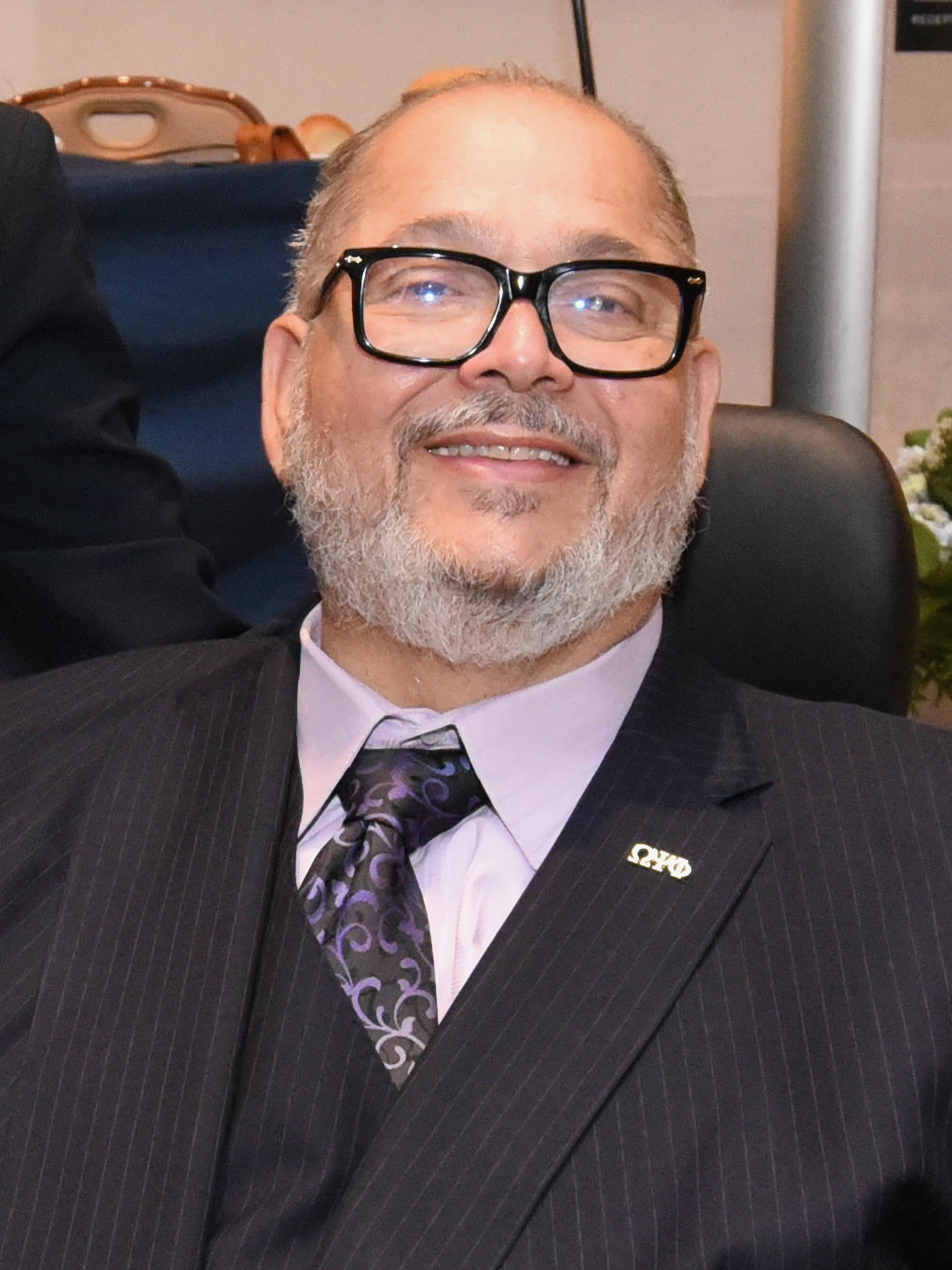
Bowie mayor Tim Adams finished second in the primary.

=== Candidates ===
==== Nominee ====
- Brooke Lierman, state delegate for the 46th district (2015–present) and attorney

==== Eliminated in primary ====
- Tim Adams, mayor of Bowie (2019–present)

==== Declined ====
- Kumar P. Barve, state delegate for the 17th district (1991–present) and accountant (endorsed Lierman)
- Brian Feldman, state senator (2013–present) and former state delegate (2003–2013) for the 15th district (endorsed Lierman)
- Peter Franchot, incumbent Comptroller (ran for governor)
- James Rosapepe, state senator for the 21st district (2007–present) and former Ambassador to Romania (1998–2001) (ran for re-election)

=== Endorsements ===
Tim Adams

State legislators

- Gabriel Acevero, state delegate for the 39th district (2019–present)
- Darryl Barnes, state delegate for the 25th district (2015–present) and chair of the Legislative Black Caucus (2018–present)
- Talmadge Branch, state delegate for the 45th district (1995–present)
- Nick Charles, state delegate for the 25th district (2019–present)
- Charlotte Crutchfield, state delegate for the 19th district (2019–present)
- Debra Davis, state delegate for the 28th district (2019–present)
- Diana Fennell, state delegate for district 47A (2015–present)
- Andrea Harrison, state delegate for the 24th district (2019–present)
- Marvin E. Holmes Jr., state delegate for the district 23B (2003–present)
- Julian Ivey, state delegate for district 47A (2019–present)
- Mike Rogers, state delegate for the 32nd district (2019–present)
- Jay Walker, state delegate for the 26th district (2007–present)
- Alonzo T. Washington, state delegate for the 22nd district (2019–present)
- Ron Watson, state senator for the 23rd district (2021–present)
- C. T. Wilson, state delegate for the 28th district (2011–present)

Local officials

- Aisha Braveboy, Prince George's County State's Attorney (2018-present)
- Jolene Ivey, Prince George's County councilperson (2018–present)
- Marilyn Mosby, Baltimore City State's Attorney (2015–present)
- Nick Mosby, President of the Baltimore City Council (2020–present)
- Bernard C. Young, former mayor of Baltimore (2019–2020)

Labor unions

- Service Employees International Union Local 400
Brooke Lierman

U.S. Senators

- Barbara Mikulski, former U.S. Senator from Maryland (1987–2017)

U.S. Representatives

- Beverly Byron, former U.S. Representative for Maryland's sixth congressional district (1979–1993)
- Steny Hoyer, U.S. Representative for Maryland's fifth congressional district (1981–present)
- Jamie Raskin, U.S. Representative for Maryland's eighth congressional district (2017–present)
- John Sarbanes, U.S. Representative for Maryland's third congressional district (2007–present)

State officials

- Parris Glendening, 59th Governor of Maryland (1995–2003)
- Gloria G. Lawlah, former Maryland Secretary of Aging (2007–2015) and state senator for the 26th district (1991–2007)

State legislators

- Curt Anderson, state delegate for the 43rd district (2003–present)
- Dalya Attar, state delegate for the 41st district (2019–present)
- Vanessa Atterbeary, state delegate for the 13th district (2015–present)
- Heather Bagnall, state delegate for the 33rd district (2019–present)
- Ben Barnes, state delegate for Maryland's 21st district (2007–present)
- J. Sandy Bartlett, state delegate for the 32nd district (2019–present)
- Kumar P. Barve, state delegate for the 17th district (1991–present)
- Pamela Beidle, state senator for the 32nd district (2019–present)
- Lisa Belcastro, state delegate for the 11th district (2020–present)
- Joanne C. Benson, state senator for the 24th district (2011–present)
- Regina T. Boyce, state delegate for the 43rd district (2019–present)
- Chanel Branch, state delegate for the 45th district (2020–present)
- Tony Bridges, state delegate for the 41st district (2019–present)
- Ned Carey, state delegate for district 31A (2015–present)
- Alfred C. Carr Jr., state delegate for the 18th district (2007–present)
- Jill P. Carter, state senator for the 41st district (2018–present)
- Mark S. Chang, state delegate for the 32nd district (2015–present)
- Lorig Charkoudian, state delegate for the 20th district (2019–present)
- Luke Clippinger, state delegate for the 46th district (2011–present)
- Bonnie Cullison, state delegate for the 19th district (2011–present)
- Kathleen Dumais, state delegate for the 15th district (2003–present)
- Eric Ebersole, state delegate for the 12th district (2015–present)
- Sarah Elfreth, state senator for the 30th district (2019–present)
- Brian J. Feldman, state senator for the 15th district (2013–present)
- Jessica Feldmark, state delegate for the 12th district (2019–present)
- Bill Ferguson, President of the Maryland Senate (2020–present) and state senator from the 46th district (2011–present)
- Cathi Forbes, state delegate for district 42A (2019–present)
- David Fraser-Hidalgo, state delegate for the 15th district (2013–present)
- Katie Fry Hester, state senator for the 9th district (2019–present)
- James W. Gilchrist, state delegate for the 17th district (2007–present)
- Michele Guyton, state delegate for district 42B (2019–present)
- Guy Guzzone, state senator for the 13th district (2015–present)
- Antonio Hayes, state senator for the 40th district (2019–present)
- Shaneka Henson, state delegate for district 30A (2019–present)
- Shelly L. Hettleman, state senator for the 11th district (2020–present)
- Terri Hill, state delegate for the 12th district (2015–present)
- Carl W. Jackson, state delegate for the 8th district (2019–present)
- Steven C. Johnson, state delegate for district 34A (2019–present)
- Adrienne A. Jones, Speaker of the Maryland House of Delegates (2019–present) and state delegate for the 10th district (1997–present)
- Dana Jones, state delegate for district 30A (2020–present)
- Rachel Jones, state delegate for district 27B (2021–present)
- Cheryl Kagan, state senator for the 17th district (2015–present)
- Anne Kaiser, state delegate for the 14th district (2003–present)
- Ariana Kelly, state delegate for the 16th district (2011–present)
- Kenneth P. Kerr, state delegate for district 3B (2019–present)
- Nancy J. King, Majority Leader of the Maryland Senate (2020–present) and state senator for the 39th district (2007–present)
- Marc Korman, state delegate for the 16th district (2015–present)
- Carol L. Krimm, state delegate for district 3A (2015–present)
- Clarence Lam, state senator for the 12th district (2019–present)
- Susan C. Lee, state senator for the 16th district (2015–present)
- Mary A. Lehman, state delegate for the 21st district (2019–present)
- Robbyn Lewis, state delegate for the 46th district (2017–present)
- Karen Lewis Young, state delegate for district 3A (2015–present)
- Lesley Lopez, state delegate for the 39th district (2019–present)
- Sara N. Love, state delegate for the 16th district (2019–present)
- Eric Luedtke, Majority Leader of the Maryland House of Delegates (2019–present) and state delegate for the 14th district (2011–present)
- Cory V. McCray, state senator for the 45th district (2019–present)
- Maggie McIntosh, state delegate for the 43rd district (2003–present)
- David Moon, state delegate for the 20th district (2015–present)
- Julie Palakovich Carr, state delegate for the 17th district (2019–present)
- Edith J. Patterson, state delegate for the 28th district (2015–present)
- Joseline Peña-Melnyk, state delegate for the 21st district (2007–present)
- Lily Qi, state delegate for the 15th district (2019–present)
- Pamela E. Queen, state delegate for the 14th district (2016–present)
- Kirill Reznik, state delegate for the 39th district (2007–present)
- Samuel I. Rosenberg, state delegate for the 41st district (1983–present)
- Sheila Ruth, state delegate for district 44B (2020–present)
- Emily Shetty, state delegate for the 18th district (2019–present)
- Stephanie M. Smith, state delegate for the 45th district (2019–present)
- William C. Smith Jr., state senator for the 20th district (2016–present)
- Jared Solomon, state delegate for the 18th district (2019–present)
- Dana Stein, state delegate for the 11th district (2007–present)
- Vaughn Stewart, state delegate for the 19th district (2019–present)
- Charles E. Sydnor III, state senator for the 44th district (2020–present)
- Jennifer R. Terrasa, state delegate for the 13th district (2019–present)
- Frank S. Turner, former state delegate for the 13th district (1995–2019)
- Jeff Waldstreicher, state senator for the 18th district (2019–present)
- Mary L. Washington, state senator for the 43rd district (2019–present)
- Courtney Watson, state delegate for district 9B (2019–present)
- Jheanelle Wilkins, state delegate for the 20th district (2017–present)
- Pat Young, state delegate for district 44B (2015–present)
- Ronald N. Young, state senator for the 3rd district (2011–present)
- Craig Zucker, state senator for the 14th district (2016–present)

Local officials

- Gabe Albornoz, Montgomery County councilperson (2018-present)
- Angela Alsobrooks, Prince George's County executive (2018-present)
- Gavin Buckley, mayor of Annapolis (2017–present)
- Jacob R. Day, mayor of Salisbury (2015–present)
- Will Jawando, Montgomery County councilperson (2018–present)
- Sidney A. Katz, Montgomery County councilperson (2014–present)
- Sharon Green Middleton, Baltimore County councilperson (2007–present)
- Don Mohler, former Baltimore County executive (2018)
- Johnny Olszewski, Baltimore County executive (2018–present)
- Craig L. Rice, Montgomery County councilperson (2010–present)
- Joel Martin Rubin, Chevy Chase councilmember (2006–present)
- Jimmy Tarlau, Mount Rainier city councilmember (2021–present)

Labor unions

- Amalgamated Transit Union Local 689
- American Federation of State, County and Municipal Employees Council 3
- American Federation of State, County and Municipal Employees Council 67
- American Federation of State, County and Municipal Employees Council 2250
- American Federation of Teachers Maryland
- Communications Workers of America Local 2100
- Communications Workers of America Local 2105
- Communications Workers of America Local 2106
- Communications Workers of America Local 2107
- Communications Workers of America Local 2108
- Communications Workers of America Local 2336
- Communications Workers of America Maryland/DC State Council
- Maryland State and District of Columbia AFL–CIO
- SEIU 1199
- SEIU 32BJ
- SEIU Local 500
- UNITE HERE Local 25

Organizations

- Bikemore
- CASA in Action
- Chesapeake Climate Action Network Action Fund
- Coalition of Asian Pacific American Democrats of Maryland
- EMILY's List
- Environment Maryland
- Lower Shore Progressive Caucus
- Maryland League of Conservation Voters
- Maryland National Organization for Women PAC
- Maryland Realtors Political Action Committee (co-endorsement with Glassman)
- Maryland State Education Association
- New Politics
- Our Revolution Maryland
- Pro-Choice Maryland
- Sierra Club

Newspapers

- Baltimore Afro-American (Democratic primary only)
- The Baltimore Sun (Democratic primary only)
- The Washington Post (Democratic primary only)
Declined to endorse

State legislators

- Michael A. Jackson, state senator for the 27th district (2021–present)

=== Debates and forums ===
2022 Maryland Democratic Comptroller primary debates
No.	Date	Host	Moderator	Link	Participants	
P Participant A Absent N Non-invitee I Invitee W Withdrawn						
P Participant A Absent N Non-invitee I Invitee W Withdrawn					Tim Adams	Brooke Lierman
1	Jan 19, 2022	Western Charles; Democratic Club; Veterans Democratic Club of Charles and Vicinity	Derrick Terry	Facebook	P	P
2	Mar 22, 2022	Prince George's Young; Men's Democratic Club	Monica Goldson	N/A	P	P
3	Mar 30, 2022	Our Revolution Maryland	Andrew Saundry	YouTube	P	P
4	Mar 30, 2022	Bowie State University; Maryland Black; Chamber of Commerce	Micheal McGee	Facebook	P	A
5	Apr 12, 2022	Bowie, Maryland	Gary Allen; Sue Livera	YouTube	A	P
6	Apr 14, 2022	Salisbury Area; Chamber of Commerce; Greater Salisbury Committee; Salisbury University PACE	Hannah Cechini	N/A	P	P
7	May 31, 2022	League of Women Voters; Maryland Matters	Josh Kurtz	Panopto	P	P

=== Fundraising ===
Primary campaign finance activity through July 3, 2022
Candidate	Raised	Spent	Cash on hand
Tim Adams	$2,725,992	$2,411,814	$585,308
Brooke Lierman	$2,321,020	$2,524,487	$384,826
Source: Maryland State Board of Elections

=== Polling ===
Poll source	Date(s) administered	Sample size (Note: Key: A – all adults RV – registered voters LV – likely voters V – unclear)	Margin of error	Tim Adams	Brooke Lierman	Other	Undecided
Goucher College	June 15–19, 2022	403 (LV)	± 4.9%	14%	28%	4%	54%
OpinionWorks	May 27 – June 2, 2022	562 (LV)	± 4.1%	19%	28%	1%	52%
HIT Strategies (D) (Note: Poll sponsored by Adams's campaign)	March 17–23, 2022	504 (LV)	± 4.5%	15%	10%	–	75%
Gonzales Research (D) (Note: Poll sponsored by Douglas J. J. Peters)	May 17–22, 2021	301 (LV)	± 5.8%	16%	13%	–	71%
Change Research (D) (Note: This poll was sponsored by Our Voice Maryland.)	September 29 – October 1, 2020	– (LV) (Note: Democratic primary voter subsample of full sample of 650 voters)	± 5.0%	3%	6%	26% (Note: "Other candidates" with 8%; would not vote with 6%; Feldman with 5%; Rosapepe and Tucker with 2%)	68%

=== Results ===
Results by county: Lierman: 50–60%; 60–70%; 70–80%; 80–90%; Adams: 50–60%

Results by precinct: Lierman: 50–60%; 60–70%; 70–80%; 80–90%; >90%; Adams: 50–60%; 60–70%; 70–80%; 80–90%; Tie No data/No votes

Democratic primary results
Party	Candidate	Votes	%
Democratic	Brooke Lierman	422,815	66.23%
Democratic	Tim Adams	215,564	33.77%
Total votes		638,379	100.0%

== Republican primary ==
=== Candidates ===
==== Nominee ====
- Barry Glassman, Harford County executive (2014–present)

=== Endorsements ===
Barry Glassman

Organizations

- Maryland Realtors Political Action Committee (co-endorsement with Lierman)
Declined to endorse

Organizations

- Maryland Republican Party

=== Debates and forums ===
2022 Maryland Republican Comptroller primary debates
No.	Date	Host	Moderator	Link	Participants
P Participant A Absent N Non-invitee I Invitee W Withdrawn					
P Participant A Absent N Non-invitee I Invitee W Withdrawn					Barry Glassman
1	Mar 30, 2022	Bowie State University; Maryland Black; Chamber of Commerce	Micheal McGee	Facebook	A
2	Apr 14, 2022	Salisbury Area; Chamber of Commerce; Greater Salisbury Committee; Salisbury University PACE	Hannah Cechini	N/A	P

=== Fundraising ===
Primary campaign finance activity through July 3, 2022
Candidate	Raised	Spent	Cash on hand
Barry Glassman	$305,730	$287,945	$459,261
Source: Maryland State Board of Elections

=== Results ===
Republican primary results
Party	Candidate	Votes	%
Republican	Barry Glassman	232,414	100.0%
Total votes		232,414	100.0%

== General election ==
=== Debates and forums ===
2022 Maryland Comptroller debates
No.	Date	Host	Moderator	Link	Democratic	Republican
P Participant A Absent N Non-invitee I Invitee W Withdrawn						
P Participant A Absent N Non-invitee I Invitee W Withdrawn					Brooke Lierman	Barry Glassman
1	August 20, 2022	Maryland Association of Counties	Mileah Kromer; Pamela Wood	N/A	P	P
2	October 6, 2022	Maryland League of Women Voters	Josh Kurtz	YouTube	P	P
3	October 18, 2022	Maryland State; Bar Association	Tom Hall	YouTube	P	A

=== Post-primary endorsements ===
Brooke Lierman (D)

Executive Branch officials

- Joe Biden, 46th President of the United States (2021–2025), 47th Vice President of the United States (2009–2017), and former U.S. Senator from Delaware (1973–2009)
- Kamala Harris, 49th Vice President of the United States (2021–2025), and former U.S. Senator from California (2017–2021)

U.S. Senators

- Ben Cardin, U.S. Senator from Maryland (2007–2025)
- Chris Van Hollen, U.S. Senator from Maryland (2017–present)

State officials

- Peter Franchot, Comptroller of Maryland (2007–2023)

Labor unions

- International Brotherhood of Electrical Workers Local 26
- Laborers' International Union of North America Local 202R
- Mid-Atlantic Region of the Laborers' International Union of North America
- Mid-Atlantic Region of the Laborers' International Union of North America West Virginia and Appalachian Laborers' District Council
- National Nurses United
- United Auto Workers

Organizations

- Planned Parenthood Action Fund
Barry Glassman (R)

State officials

- Bob Ehrlich, 60th Governor of Maryland (2003–2007)
- Larry Hogan, 62nd Governor of Maryland (2015–2023)

Labor unions

- Maryland Fraternal Order of Police

Organizations

- Maryland Farm Bureau

Newspapers

- The Washington Post
Declined to endorse

State legislator

- Bryan Simonaire, Minority Leader of the Maryland Senate (2020–2022) and state senator from the 31st district (2007–present) (Republican)

=== Fundraising ===
Primary campaign finance activity through November 15, 2022
Candidate	Raised	Spent	Cash on hand
Brooke Lierman	$3,640,557	$4,040,817	$188,033
Barry Glassman	$399,332	$802,505	$38,304
Source: Maryland State Board of Elections

=== Polling ===
Poll source	Date(s) administered	Sample size	Margin of error	Brooke Lierman (D)	Barry Glassman (R)	Other	Undecided
OpinionWorks	October 20–23, 2022	982 (LV)	± 3.1%	57%	29%	–	–
Goucher College	September 8–12, 2022	748 (LV)	± 3.6%	48%	35%	1% (Note: "Some other candidate" (volunteered response) with 1%)	17%

=== Results ===

2022 Maryland Comptroller election
Party	Candidate	Votes	%	±%
Democratic	Brooke Lierman	1,223,044	61.56%	−10.51%
Republican	Barry Glassman	761,422	38.33%	+10.54%
Write-in		2,244	0.11%	-0.03%
Total votes		1,986,710	100.0%	
Democratic hold				

==== By county ====
By county

County	Brooke Lierman Democratic		Barry Glassman Republican		Write-in	
County	#	%	#	%	#	%
Allegany	6,509	30.43%	14,867	69.5%	16	0.07%
Anne Arundel	112,420	52.52%	101,440	47.39%	194	0.09%
Baltimore	162,034	59.34%	110,736	40.55%	286	0.1%
Baltimore City	124,206	86.74%	18,733	13.08%	262	0.18%
Calvert	15,686	42.47%	21,219	57.46%	26	0.07%
Caroline	3,267	30.99%	7,263	68.9%	11	0.1%
Carroll	24,261	34.3%	46,421	65.63%	54	0.08%
Cecil	10,811	33.0%	21,927	66.93%	25	0.08%
Charles	37,001	68.41%	17,031	31.49%	52	0.1%
Dorchester	4,641	41.3%	6,581	58.57%	15	0.13%
Frederick	53,023	50.43%	52,050	49.5%	70	0.07%
Garrett	2,462	22.05%	8,700	77.9%	6	0.05%
Harford	38,064	37.05%	64,359	62.65%	300	0.29%
Howard	83,509	64.8%	45,267	35.13%	91	0.07%
Kent	3,982	47.75%	4,356	52.23%	2	0.02%
Montgomery	255,463	75.35%	83,220	24.55%	334	0.1%
Prince George's	212,985	89.65%	24,204	10.19%	379	0.16%
Queen Anne's	7,715	33.94%	15,003	66.01%	12	0.05%
Somerset	2,503	37.37%	4,187	62.52%	7	0.1%
St. Mary's	14,312	38.54%	22,803	61.4%	23	0.06%
Talbot	8,065	46.09%	9,424	53.85%	11	0.06%
Washington	17,717	36.87%	30,302	63.07%	29	0.06%
Wicomico	13,778	45.35%	16,575	54.55%	30	0.1%
Worcester	8,630	36.89%	14,754	63.07%	9	0.04%
Totals	1,223,044	61.56%	761,422	38.33%	2,244	0.11%

Counties that flipped from Democratic to Republican

- Allegany (largest municipality: Cumberland)
- Carroll (largest municipality: Eldersburg)
- Harford (largest municipality: Aberdeen)
- Calvert (largest municipality: Chesapeake Beach)
- Queen Anne's (largest municipality: Stevensville)
- Caroline (largest municipality: Denton)
- St. Mary's (largest municipality: California)
- Kent (largest municipality: Chestertown)
- Talbot (largest municipality: Easton)
- Dorchester (largest municipality: Cambridge)
- Somerset (largest municipality: Princess Anne)
- Wicomico (largest municipality: Salisbury)
- Worcester (largest municipality: Ocean Pines)

==== By congressional district ====
Lierman won seven of eight congressional districts.

District	Lierman	Glassman	Representative
1st	38%	62%	Andy Harris
2nd	56%	44%	Dutch Ruppersberger
3rd	57%	43%	John Sarbanes
4th	89%	10%	Anthony Brown (117th Congress)
4th	89%	10%	Glenn Ivey (118th Congress)
5th	65%	35%	Steny Hoyer
6th	50.3%	49.7%	David Trone
7th	80%	20%	Kweisi Mfume
8th	76%	23%	Jamie Raskin

== See also ==
- Elections in Maryland
- 2022 United States elections
- 2022 Maryland gubernatorial election
- 2022 Maryland Attorney General election
- 2022 United States Senate election in Maryland
- 2022 United States House of Representatives elections in Maryland

== Notes ==
Partisan clients
