= Luke Clippinger =

American politician (born 1972)

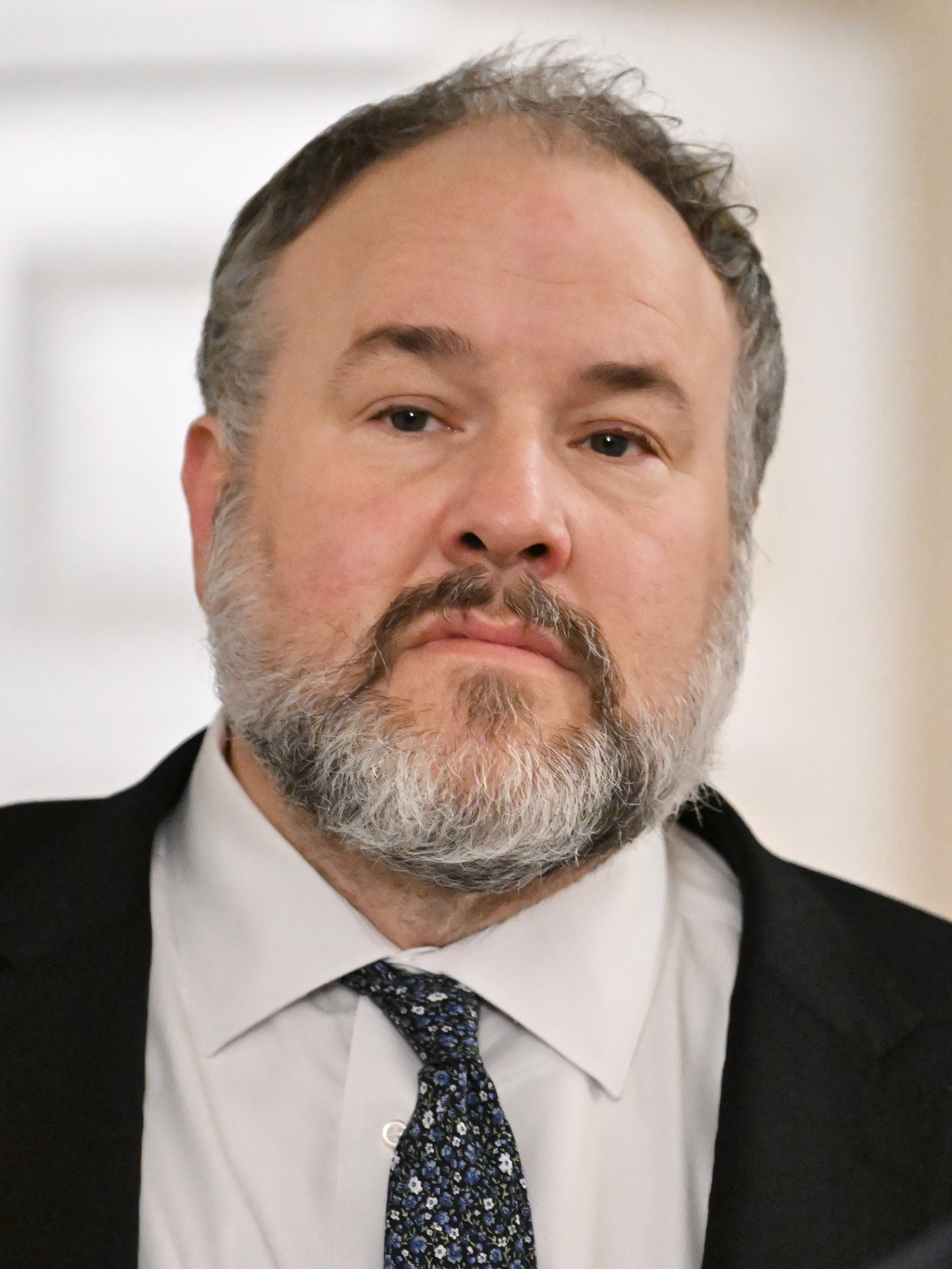
- Clippinger in 2024

Speaker pro tempore of the Maryland House of Delegates
- Incumbent
- Assumed office January 14, 2026
- Preceded by: Dana Stein

Member of the Maryland House of Delegates from the 46th district
- Incumbent
- Assumed office January 12, 2011 Serving with Mark Edelson, Robbyn Lewis
- Preceded by: Carolyn J. Krysiak

Personal details
- Born: September 24, 1972 (age 54) Baltimore, Maryland, U.S.
- Party: Democratic
- Education: Earlham College (BA); University of Louisville (JD)
- Website: State House website Campaign website

Luke H. Clippinger (born September 24, 1972) is an American politician and lawyer who has served as a member of the Maryland House of Delegates, representing the state's 46th district in Baltimore, since 2011. A member of the Democratic Party, he has served as the speaker pro tempore of the Maryland House of Delegates since 2026.

Born and raised in Baltimore, Clippinger graduated from Earlham College and the University of Louisville. He started his political career while attending Earlham, volunteering for the local Democratic Party before serving as the campaign manager of U.S. representative Lee Hamilton's 1996 re-election campaign. Clippinger later served as U.S. representative Baron Hill's district director from 1999 to 2005, afterwards serving as the campaign manager of Tom Perez's 2006 Maryland Attorney General campaign.

Clippinger was elected to the Maryland House of Delegates in 2010, becoming one of the chamber's first openly gay members. During his tenure, he has supported efforts to expand LGBT rights, renewable energy, and gun control.

== Early life and education ==
Clippinger was born in Baltimore on September 24, 1972. He graduated from the Baltimore Polytechnic Institute and attended Earlham College, where he served as the manager of the WECI radio station and earned a Bachelor of Arts degree in politics in 1994, and the University of Louisville, where he earned a Juris Doctor degree in 2005. He was admitted to the Maryland Bar in 2007.

== Political career ==
Clippinger says he first became involved with politics at a young age as a worker in Mary Pat Clarke's city council campaign.

While attending Earlham, Clippinger volunteered for the Democratic Party in Richmond, Indiana, conducting polls for various elections in Wayne County, Indiana, and serving as the communications director for the Wayne County Democratic Party from 1992 to 1994. Clippinger ran unsuccessfully for Wayne Township assessor in 1994. After graduating, he interned for Indiana state senators Lindel Hume and Joe O'Day during the 1995 legislative session, afterwards working as an office manager for Baltimore mayoral election candidate Mary Pat Clarke. In 1996, Clippinger worked as an intern and was later named to manage the re-election campaign of U.S. Representative Lee Hamilton. He worked as a community development specialist for the Indiana Department of Commerce until 1998, when he was named to manage the campaign of congressional candidate Baron Hill and, following his election to Congress, became Hill's district director until 2005.

In 2006, Clippinger was named as the campaign manager for Tom Perez's short-lived campaign for Attorney General of Maryland. Afterwards, he worked as a spokesperson for Stephanie Rawlings-Blake's mayoral campaign and as an assistant state's attorney in Anne Arundel County since 2007. Clippinger served as a member of the platform committee at the 2008 Democratic National Convention.

== In the legislature ==
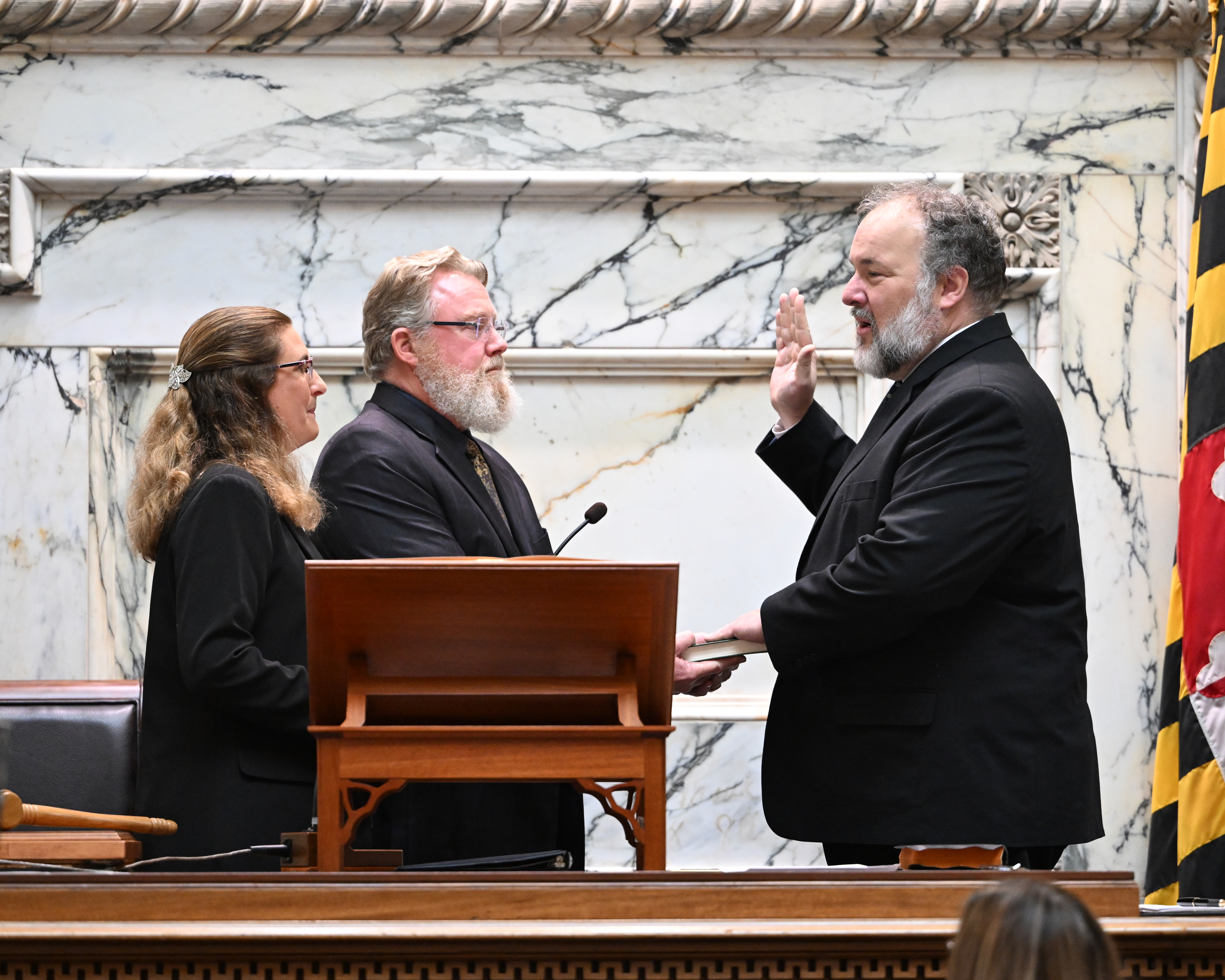
Clippinger is sworn in as speaker pro tempore, 2026

In 2010, Clippinger ran for the Maryland House of Delegates in District 46, seeking to succeed retiring state delegate Carolyn J. Krysiak. He won the Democratic primary election in September, placing third with 18.7 percent of the vote.

Clippinger was sworn into the Maryland House of Delegates on January 12, 2011. He was a member of the Judiciary Committee from 2011 to 2015, afterwards serving in the Economic Matters Committee before returning to the Judiciary Committee as its chair in 2019. Clippinger served as the chair of the Democratic Party Caucus from 2015 to 2018. In December 2025, House Speaker Joseline Peña-Melnyk named Clippinger as the speaker pro tempore of the House of Delegates.

In January 2026, Clippinger replaced his campaign treasurer, Melissa Evans, after the Maryland State Board of Elections found that Evans had mismanaged about $44,000 in checks written to his campaign account from 2020 to 2024. After the firing, Clippinger said that he would "immediately retain an accounting professional to review the treasurer's mismanagement of my campaign account", and forwarded the matter to the Office of the State Prosecutor. In November 2026, Evans was charged with felony theft scheme, embezzlement, and perjury, with prosecutors alleging that she had stolen more than $87,000 from Clippinger's campaign account over a span of eight years.

== Political positions ==
Maryland Matters has described Clippinger as a "leader of the progressive wing" in the House.

=== Business ===
During the 2018 legislative session, Clippinger supported the Reform on Tap Act, a bill backed by Comptroller Peter Franchot to deregulate the state's craft beer industry.

In 2022, Clippinger supported legislation that would require companies on The Block in Baltimore to close at 10 p.m. nightly.

=== Crime and policing ===
During the 2014 legislative session, Clippinger introduced "Jake's Law", a bill that would increase penalties for drivers who cause fatal accidents while texting and driving. The bill was named for Jake Owen, a five-year-old boy who was killed in a 2011 crash caused by a driver who was talking on his phone. The bill passed and was signed into law by Governor Martin O'Malley.

In July 2017, Clippinger and other lawmakers from District 46 released an "anti-violence plan" that called for increased funding for social programs and strengthened gun laws.

During the 2019 legislative session, Clippinger introduced a bill that would require police trial boards to release audio from their hearings under the state Open Meetings Act. The bill passed the House of Delegates, but died in the Senate Judicial Proceedings Committee.

In May 2020, Clippinger expressed disappointment with Governor Larry Hogan's veto of a bill to increase funding for the Baltimore Police Department for 10 high-crime "microzones" in the city.

During the 2021 legislative session, Clippinger introduced a bill to remove the governor of Maryland from the state's parole board. The bill passed, but was vetoed by Hogan.

In 2023, Clippinger supported legislation that would give the attorney general of Maryland sole prosecutorial power over cases involving police-involved deaths.

=== Education ===
In August 2019, Clippinger signed onto a letter calling for the Maryland State Department of Education to add lessons on LGBT and disability rights movements into social studies curriculum. The Department of Education agreed to update its curriculum to include this material two weeks after it was sent.

=== Gun policy ===
During the 2022 legislative session, Clippinger supported a bill to ban privately made firearms. He also defended a bill that would require firearms dealers to install security devices, including 24-hour burglary alarm systems and security bars.

In 2023, Clippinger introduced legislation to increase the requirements and fees to obtain a handgun permit. The bill passed and was signed into law by Governor Wes Moore.

=== Marijuana ===
During the 2022 legislative session, Clippinger supported legislation creating a statewide referendum on legalizing recreational cannabis in Maryland. He also introduced a bill establishing the framework for the state's cannabis industry, which passed and became law without Governor Larry Hogan's signature.

=== Paid sick leave ===
During the 2017 legislative session, Clippinger introduced the Maryland Healthy Working Families Act, a bill that would allow workers to accrue up to seven days of paid sick leave a year. The bill passed, but was vetoed by Governor Larry Hogan; lawmakers voted to override Hogan's veto during the 2018 legislative session.

=== Social issues ===
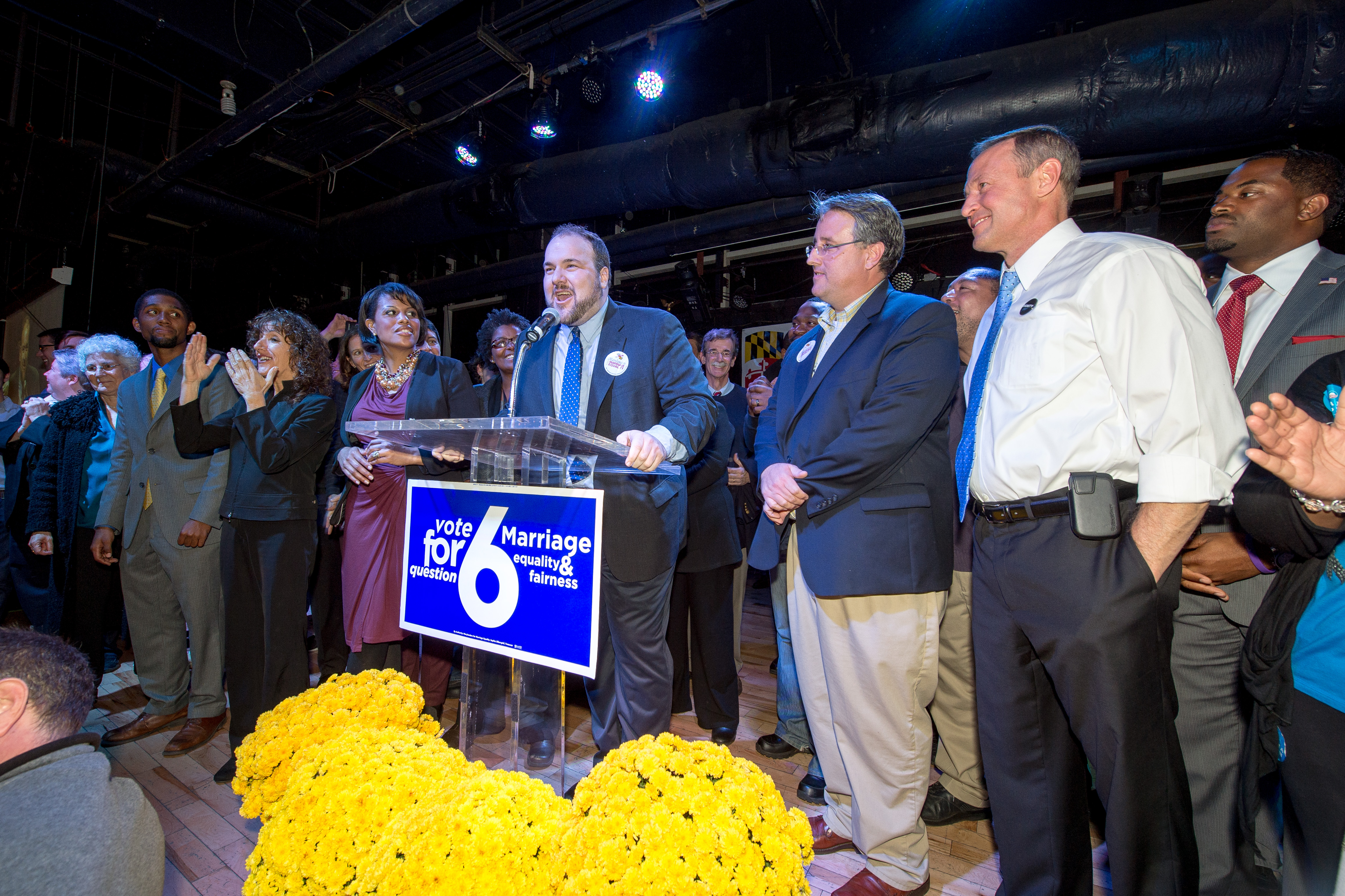
Clippinger speaks at the Question 6 victory party, 2012

During the 2011 legislative session, Clippinger supported the Civil Marriage Protection Act, a bill to legalize same-sex marriage in Maryland. He supported it again when it was reintroduced in 2012, during which it passed and was signed into law. Clippinger opposed Question 6, a 2012 referendum to repeal the Civil Marriage Protection Act.

During the 2013 legislative session, Clippinger attended a rally at the Maryland State House to support a bill that would ban discrimination against transgender people. He reintroduced the bill in 2014, during which it passed and was signed into law by Governor Martin O'Malley.

During the 2014 legislative session, Clippinger introduced legislation to ban conversion therapy on minors. In 2020, he supported legislation to repeal sodomy as a criminal offense. Clippinger supported the bill when it was reintroduced during the 2023 legislative session, during which it passed and became law without Governor Wes Moore's signature.

In April 2015, after the Indiana General Assembly passed the Religious Freedom Restoration Act, Clippinger penned an open letter inviting Indiana businesses to relocate to Maryland.

In April 2019, Clippinger called for the resignation of Baltimore mayor Catherine Pugh amid the Healthy Holly scandal.

== Personal life ==
Clippinger is openly gay. He attends the Brown Memorial Presbyterian Church in Baltimore.

In April 2016, Clippinger said that he experienced "significant fatigue" at the end of the 2016 legislative session, and in June he was diagnosed with a rare form of leukemia. In January 2017, he said that the cancer was in remission.

== Electoral history ==
Wayne Township Assessor election, 1994
Party	Candidate	Votes	%
Republican	Michael Statzer (incumbent)	6,887	64.3
Democratic	Luke Clippinger	3,830	35.7

Maryland House of Delegates District 46 Democratic primary election, 2010
Party	Candidate	Votes	%
Democratic	Peter A. Hammen (incumbent)	5,632	26.0
Democratic	Brian K. McHale (incumbent)	4,128	19.0
Democratic	Luke Clippinger	4,052	18.7
Democratic	Bill Romani	3,410	15.7
Democratic	Jason Filippou	2,503	11.5
Democratic	Melissa A. Techentin	1,962	9.0

Maryland House of Delegates District 46 election, 2010
Party	Candidate	Votes	%
Democratic	Peter A. Hammen (incumbent)	15,367	29.6
Democratic	Brian K. McHale (incumbent)	14,871	28.6
Democratic	Luke Clippinger	14,159	27.3
Republican	Roger Bedingfield	7,338	14.1
Write-in		205	0.4

Maryland House of Delegates District 46 election, 2014
Party	Candidate	Votes	%
Democratic	Brooke Lierman	13,889	24.6
Democratic	Peter A. Hammen (incumbent)	13,217	23.4
Democratic	Luke Clippinger (incumbent)	12,680	22.5
Republican	Roger D. Bedingfield	6,113	10.8
Republican	Joseph "Joh" Sedtal	5,275	9.4
Republican	Duane Shelton	5,115	9.1
Write-in		117	0.2

Maryland House of Delegates District 46 election, 2018
Party	Candidate	Votes	%
Democratic	Brooke Lierman (incumbent)	23,711	28.6
Democratic	Luke Clippinger (incumbent)	23,023	27.8
Democratic	Robbyn Lewis	22,582	27.3
Republican	Jeremy Baron	6,879	8.3
Republican	Nicholas Wentworth	6,324	7.6
Write-in		289	0.3

Maryland House of Delegates District 46 election, 2022
Party	Candidate	Votes	%
Democratic	Robbyn Lewis (incumbent)	22,274	30.8
Democratic	Luke Clippinger (incumbent)	22,162	30.7
Democratic	Mark Edelson	22,103	30.6
Republican	Pete Waters	5,492	7.6
Write-in		265	0.4

Maryland House of Delegates
Preceded by Dana Stein	Speaker pro tempore of the Maryland House of Delegates; 2026–present	Incumbent
