= Mark Edelson =

American politician (born 1985)

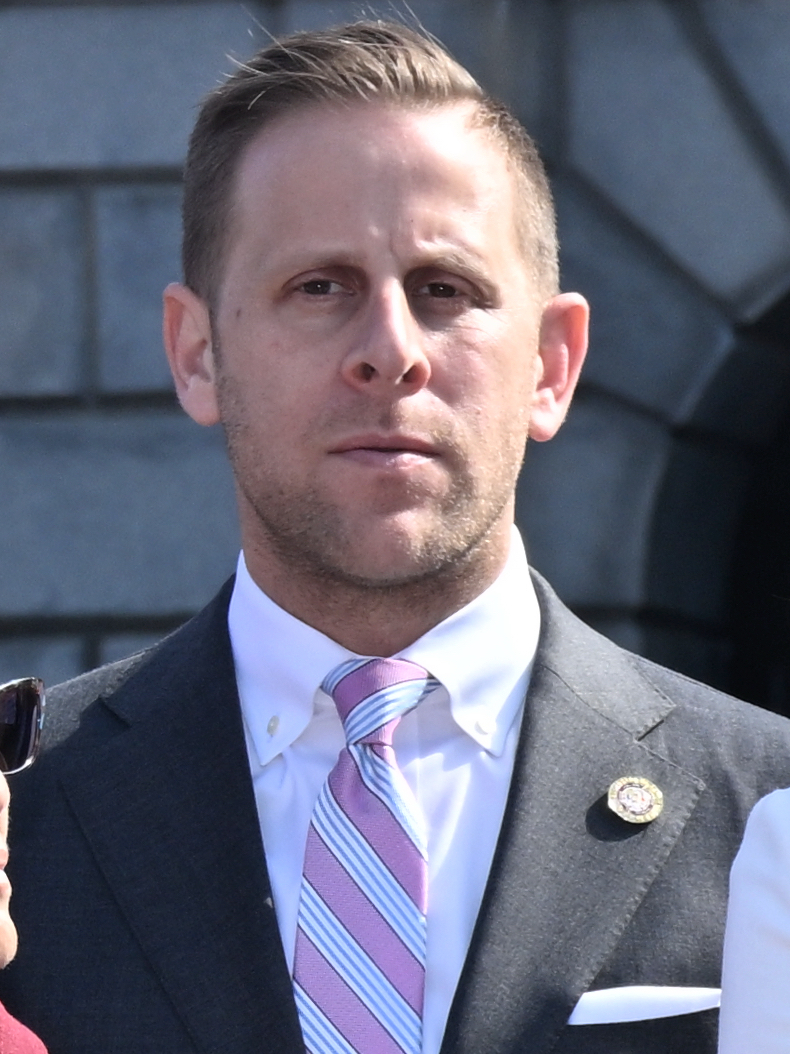
- Edelson in 2023

Member of the Maryland House of Delegates from the 46th district
- Incumbent
- Assumed office January 11, 2023 Serving with Luke Clippinger and Robbyn Lewis
- Preceded by: Brooke Lierman

Personal details
- Born: July 12, 1984 (age 42) Pretoria, South Africa
- Party: Democratic
- Education: Georgia State University; University of Maryland Francis King Carey School of Law (JD)
- Occupation: Attorney
- Website: Campaign website

Mark Edelson (born September 12, 1985) is a South African-born American politician and attorney who is a member of the Maryland House of Delegates for District 46 in Baltimore.

== Background ==
In 1999, Edelson's family moved from South Africa to Atlanta, Georgia, where he attended Georgia State University, where he earned degrees in philosophy and criminal justice. He moved to Baltimore in 2007 to attend the University of Maryland School of Law, earning his Juris Doctor degree in 2010. After graduating, Edelson worked for the Goldman & Goldman, P.A. law firm and became a board member of The Associated: Jewish Community Federation of Baltimore and the Baltimore Jewish Council.

In June 2015, Edelson announced that he would run for the Baltimore City Council in District 1, seeking to succeed outgoing city councilmember Jim Kraft. He ran on a platform that included creating "transit hubs" within the city and streamlining the city permitting process. Edelson came in third place in the Democratic primary with 17.3 percent of the vote.

In June 2017, Edelson was the attorney for Bikemore when the bike advocacy group filed a lawsuit against the city of Baltimore to block the demolition of protected bike lanes on Potomac Street. Circuit Court Judge Althea M. Handy halted the demolition on June 10, 2017. The lawsuit was dropped on June 28, 2017, after Baltimore Mayor Catherine Pugh pledged not to demolish the bike lanes.

In 2018, Edelson became the president of the Canton Community Association. While president, the group evaluated how to make the neighborhood more welcoming, including the removal of the statue of John O'Donnell, opposed a proposal to expand Boston Street in southeast Baltimore, and advocated for the revival of the Red Line.

In 2020, Edelson worked on the transition team for Baltimore Mayor-elect Brandon Scott, serving on its transportation and infrastructure subcommittee.

In 2022, Edelson ran for the Maryland House of Delegates in District 46, seeking to succeed outgoing state delegate Brooke Lierman. During the primary, he received endorsements from councilmember Zeke Cohen, former state delegate Carolyn J. Krysiak, and former councilmembers Jim Kraft, Ed Reisinger, and Rikki Spector. Edelson won the Democratic primary on July 19, 2022, coming in third place behind incumbents Robbyn Lewis and Luke Clippinger with 19.0 percent of the vote.

== In the legislature ==
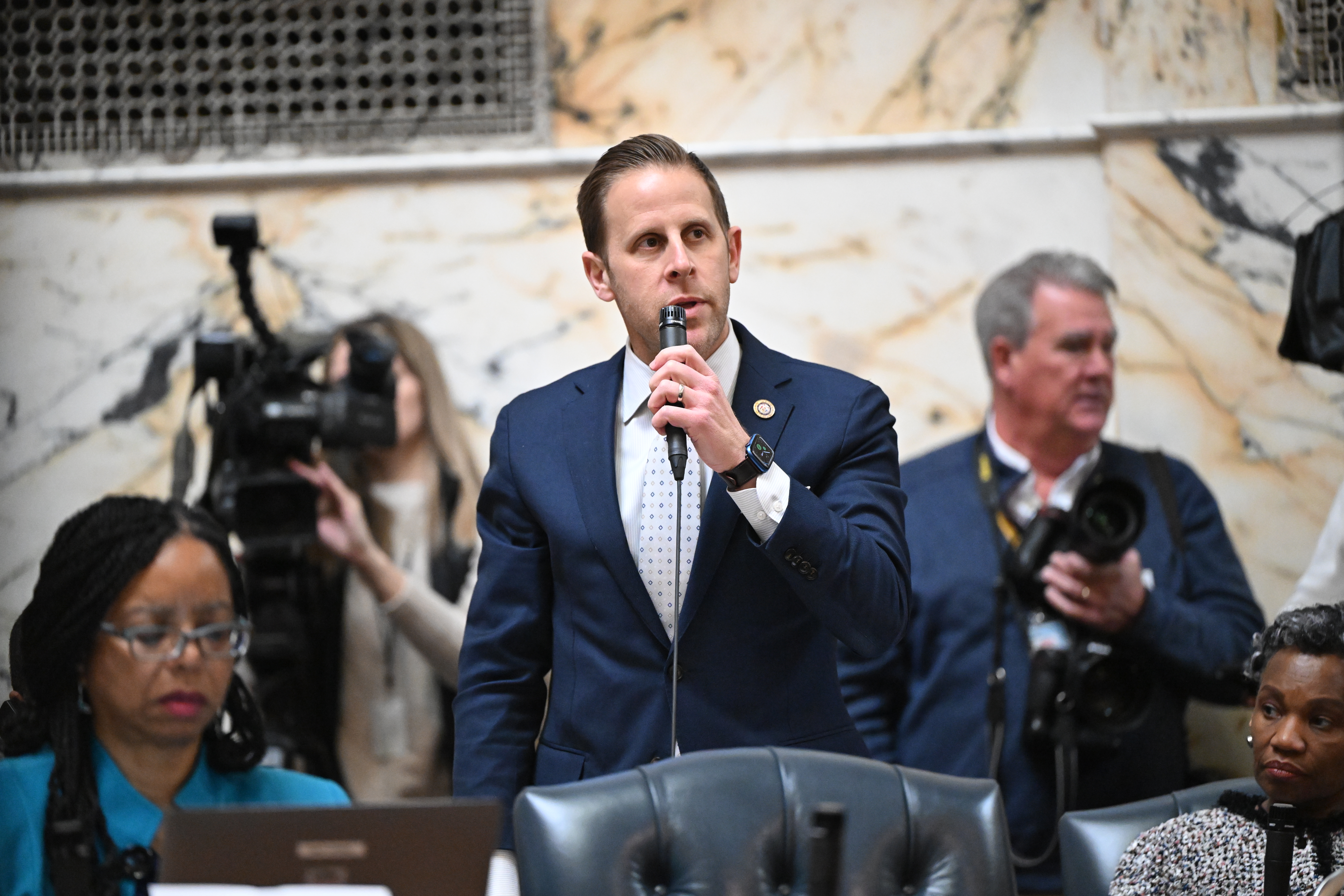
Edelson speaks on the House floor, 2025

Edelson was sworn into the Maryland House of Delegates on January 11, 2023. He is a member of the House Appropriations Committee.

== Political positions ==
During the 2026 legislative session, Edelson supported a bill that would create oversight boards in the Maryland Transit Administration (MTA) to oversee the state's public transit systems as well as review and approve the MTA's budget and major capital projects.

== Personal life ==
Edelson lives in the Canton neighborhood of Baltimore. He is Jewish.

== Electoral history ==
Baltimore City Council District 1 Democratic primary election, 2016
Party	Candidate	Votes	%
Democratic	Zeke Cohen	2,196	27.3
Democratic	Scott Goldman	1,661	20.7
Democratic	Mark Edelson	1,387	17.3
Democratic	Mark Parker	1,362	17.0
Democratic	Ed Marcinko	830	10.3
Democratic	Sean P. Flanagan	597	7.4

Maryland House of Delegates District 46 Democratic primary election, 2022
Party	Candidate	Votes	%
Democratic	Robbyn Lewis	8,449	24.5
Democratic	Luke Clippinger	7,560	22.0
Democratic	Mark Edelson	6,550	19.0
Democratic	Vince Andrews	5,692	16.5
Democratic	Sean D. Burns	3,220	9.4
Democratic	Augusta Yeager Christensen	2,954	8.6

Maryland House of Delegates District 46 election, 2022
Party	Candidate	Votes	%
Democratic	Robbyn Lewis (incumbent)	22,274	30.81
Democratic	Luke Clippinger (incumbent)	22,162	30.65
Democratic	Mark Edelson	22,103	30.57
Republican	Pete Waters	5,492	7.60
Write-in		265	0.37
