= Robbyn Lewis =

American politician (born 1963)

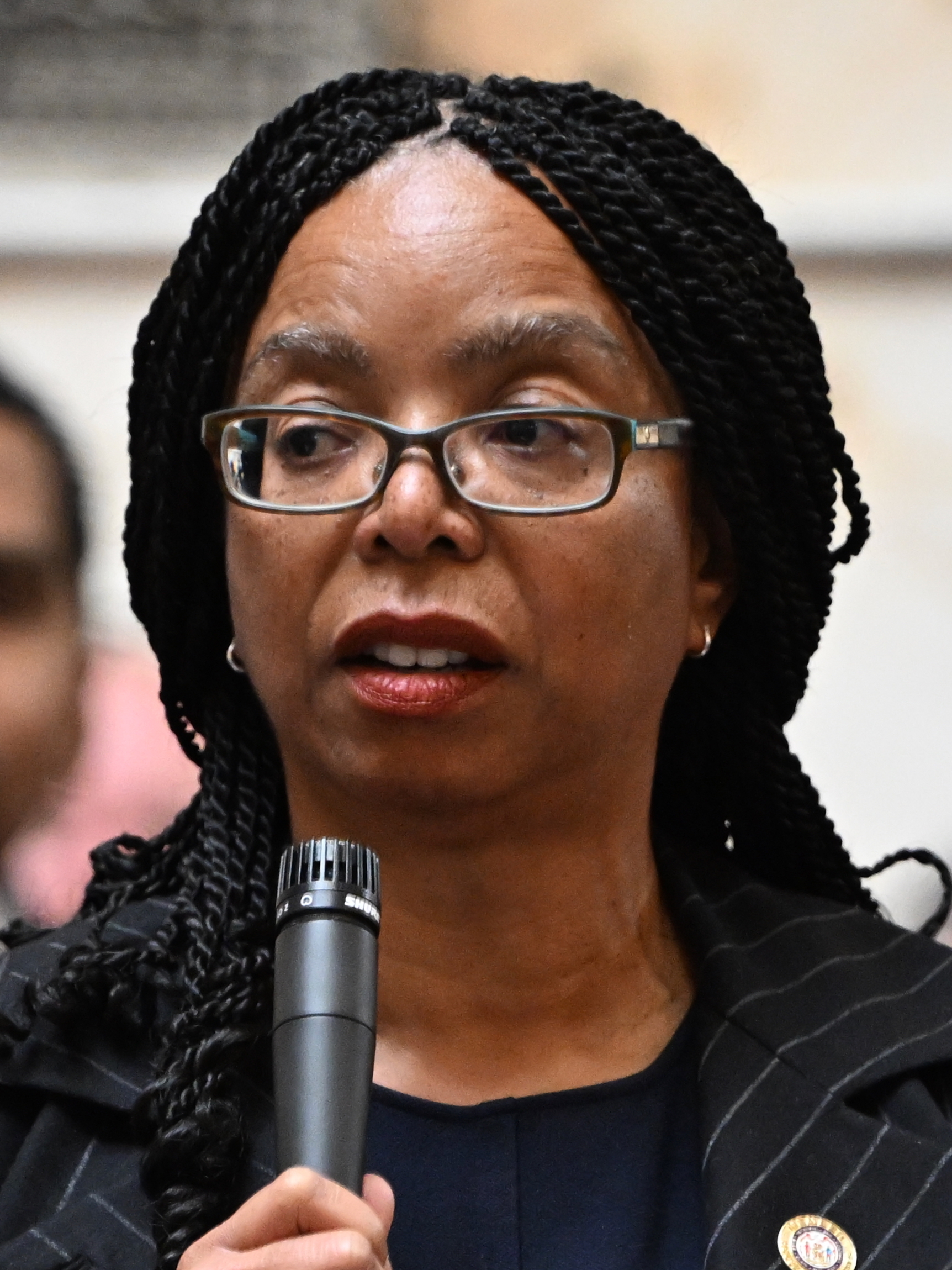
- Lewis in 2025

Member of the Maryland House of Delegates from the 46th district
- Incumbent
- Assumed office January 10, 2017 Serving with Mark Edelson, Luke Clippinger
- Appointed by: Larry Hogan
- Preceded by: Peter A. Hammen

Personal details
- Born: July 18, 1963 (age 63) Gary, Indiana, U.S.
- Party: Democratic
- Education: University of Chicago (BA); Columbia University MPH)

Robbyn T. Lewis (born July 18, 1963) is an American politician who has served as a member of the Maryland House of Delegates representing the 46th district since 2017.

== Early life and education ==
Lewis was born in Gary, Indiana, on July 18, 1963. Her ancestors escaped slavery in America through the Underground Railroad, but returned following the Civil War. Lewis' parents were among the first beneficiaries of the Fair Housing Act of 1968, which allowed them to move from Gary to Chicago. She graduated from the Latin School of Chicago and later attended the University of Chicago, where she earned a Bachelor of Arts degree in anthropology in 1990, and Columbia University, where she earned a Master of Public Health in international health in 1998.

== Career ==
=== Early career ===
After graduating from the Latin School, Lewis worked as a teacher at the YMCA International Language School in Kaohsiung, Taiwan, afterwards working as a courier for Frontier Nursing Service. From 1990 to 1991, Lewis volunteered for the Peace Corps in Niger.

After graduating from Columbia, Lewis worked as a research coordinator at the Johns Hopkins Bloomberg School of Public Health and as a consultant for Population Services International in Haiti. After moving to Baltimore from Haiti in 1999, she worked at Jhpiego until 2006, first as a project specialist and then as a program manager for the organization's cervical cancer prevention program. Afterwards, Lewis worked for Family Health International from 2007 to 2009, as a senior research program manager for the Center for Immunization Research at the Bloomberg School of Public Health until 2011, and as a regional manager for the International Pregnancy Advisory Services in west and south Africa from 2012 to 2014. Since 2019, she has worked as a civic data fellow for the University of Baltimore.

=== Political involvement ===
Lewis first became involved with politics in 2002 as the secretary of Friends of Patterson Park and as the vice president for the Patterson Park Neighborhood Association, where she aided with efforts to plant trees along sidewalks. From 2011 to 2012, she started and ran her own political action committee to support the Red Line and served on policymaking committees for transportation projects in Baltimore within the Maryland Transit Administration and the Baltimore City Department of Transportation. Lewis later served on policymaking committees for the Maryland Environmental Health Network and Blue Water Baltimore, and currently serves on the boards of various transit groups in east Baltimore, including Bikemore and the Southeast Community Development Corporation.

From 2014 to 2017, Lewis served as a special assistant to the Maryland Health Benefit Exchange. In 2016, she graduated from a training course hosted by Emerge Maryland, an organization created to prepare potential female Democratic candidates for public office.

=== Maryland House of Delegates ===
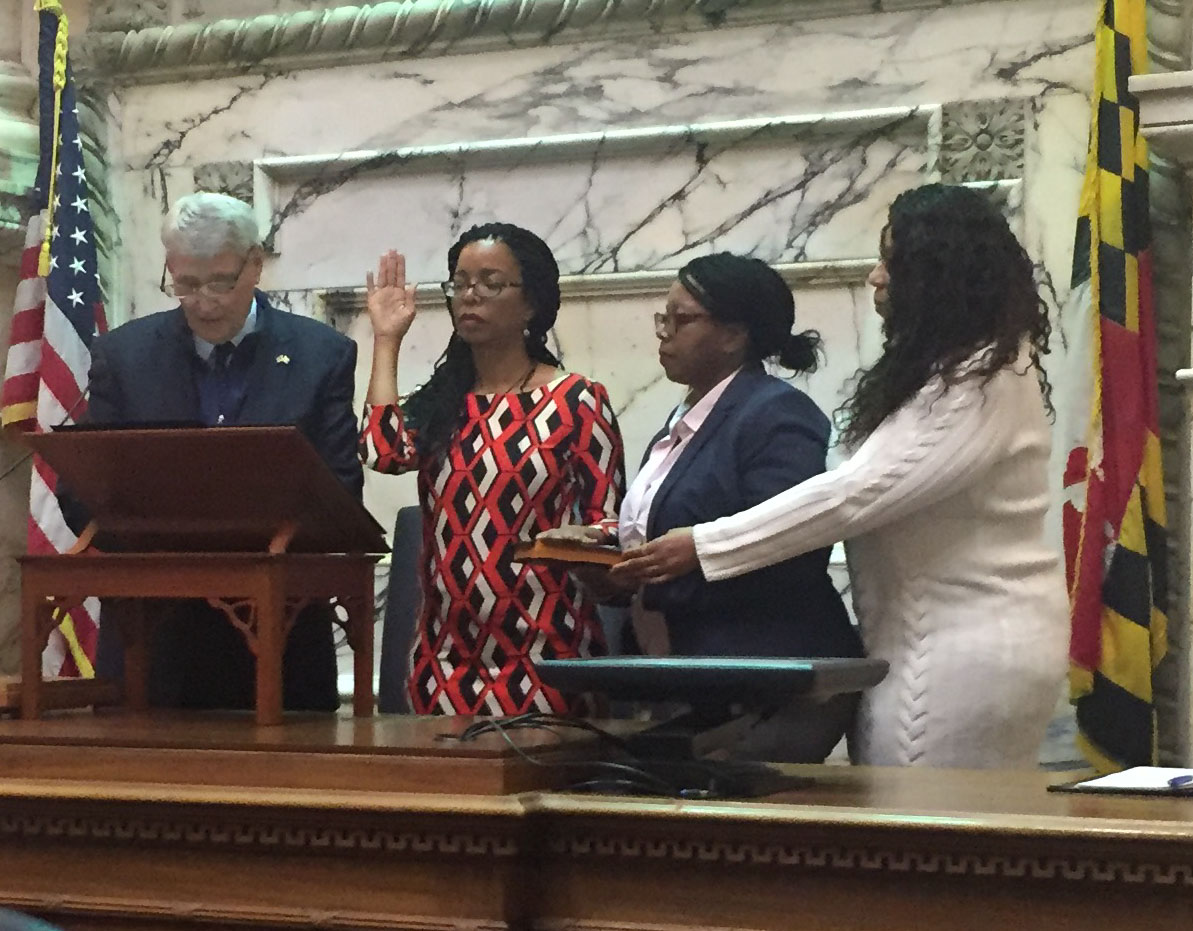
Maryland House Speaker Michael E. Busch swearing in Delegate-designate Robbyn Lewis

In December 2016, following the resignation of state delegate Peter A. Hammen to serve in the administration of Baltimore mayor Catherine Pugh, Lewis applied to serve the remainder of his term in the Maryland House of Delegates. Her candidacy was backed by state senator Bill Ferguson and state delegates Brooke Lierman and Luke Clippinger. The Baltimore City Democratic Central Committee voted 6–1 to nominate Lewis to fill the vacancy later that month, and was appointed by Governor Larry Hogan on December 30.

Lewis was sworn in on January 10, 2017. She is the first African-American woman to represent the district. Lewis was a member of the Environment and Transportation Committee from 2017 to 2018, and has since served on the Health and Government Operations Committee. In January 2026, House Speaker Joseline Peña-Melnyk named Lewis as the co-chair of the newly created House Study Group on Economic Stability.

Lewis ran for a full four-year term in 2018, during which she ran on a slate with Ferguson, Lierman and Clippinger, and faced a primary challenge from political newcomer Nate Loewentheil. She defeated Loewentheil in the Democratic primary on June 26, 2018, receiving 23 percent of the vote to Loewentheil's 14.1 percent.

In April 2019, ahead of the election to elect a new Speaker of the Maryland House of Delegates, Lewis condemned homophobic comments made by Legislative Black Caucus of Maryland chair Darryl Barnes toward Speaker candidate Maggie McIntosh, calling them "disappointing and upsetting". Following the election, she stepped down as the secretary of the Legislative Black Caucus, saying that she felt disconnected from the caucus amid its role in the Speaker election.

In 2024, Lewis applied to run as a delegate to the Democratic National Convention pledged to Joe Biden, but was denied by the Maryland Democratic Party.

== Political positions ==
=== Business ===
During the 2018 legislative session, Lewis criticized Governor Larry Hogan's proposed $5 billion incentive package to encourage Amazon to build its second headquarters in Montgomery County, saying that the money would be better spent on reviving the Red Line.

In 2022, Lewis supported legislation that would require companies on The Block in Baltimore to close at 10 p.m. nightly.

=== Crime and policing ===
In July 2017, Lewis and other lawmakers from District 46 released an "anti-violence plan" that called for increased funding for social programs and strengthened gun laws.

During the 2019 legislative session, Lewis voted against legislation that would allow Johns Hopkins University to have its own private police force, later stating on the House floor that the bill would "set Baltimore back in terms of our progress". In 2020, she said she was "neutral" on a bill to expand the powers of the Morgan State University police force.

=== Environment ===
In April 2017, Lewis said she supported proposals to build a wind farm off the coast of Ocean City, Maryland, believing it would help the state achieve its renewable energy goals.

During the 2018 legislative session, Lewis introduced a bill to monitor air pollution levels around large chicken farms on the Eastern Shore of Maryland. In March 2018, she participated in a protest against the Potomac Pipeline, a planned natural gas pipeline beneath the Potomac River.

In 2019, Lewis introduced the Maryland Healthy Children Act, a bill that would require the Maryland Department of the Environment to develop regulations on investigating and reporting lead hazards. Following amendments that weakened the bill, the bill unanimously passed and became law.

=== Health care ===
During the 2020 legislative session, Lewis introduced legislation to expand protections, including hospital-provided financial assistance and charity care, for hospital patients with medical debt.

In 2021, Lewis introduced bills that would require senior-level members of state government to be trained in trauma-informed care, and another that would require licensed health professionals to undergo implicit bias training.

During the 2023 legislative session, Lewis introduced legislation that would provide create a program within the Maryland Health Benefit Exchange to help small businesses enroll their employees in health care plans.

=== Gun policy ===
In March 2018, Lewis voted against a bill that would allow Baltimore school resource officers to carry guns inside schools.

=== Social issues ===
In January 2019, Lewis was one of nine Maryland lawmakers to add their names to a manifesto signed by 326 state legislators to reaffirm their commitment to protecting abortion rights.

During the 2023 legislative session, Lewis introduced a bill that would provide Walters Art Museum employees with collective bargaining rights. The bill was withdrawn after the museum and its employees signed an agreement allowing for a union election.

=== Transportation ===
Lewis supports the Red Line, and criticized Governor Larry Hogan's cancellation of the transit project. She also supports initiatives to build bike lanes and wheelchair-accessible areas in east and west parts of Baltimore. In May 2019, Lewis called on Mayor Jack Young to postpone the city's removal of protect bike lanes in east Baltimore, asking for the mayor to develop a compromise solution between city officials, property owners, and local residents.

During the 2018 legislative session, Lewis introduced a bill that would install traffic cameras to keep drivers out of bus lanes.

In April 2019, Lewis criticized a proposal by Elon Musk to build a 35-mile Hyperloop connecting Washington, D.C. and Baltimore, calling it "utter nonsense" and arguing that the state should instead expand its MARC and light rail lines.

In June 2019, Lewis started a "#TransitChallenge" campaign on social media to encourage Marylanders to use public transit for a week in an effort to point out inadequacies in Baltimore's public transit system. In September, Twitter suspended her account for "excessive" use of hashtags after she made a series of tweets promoting public transit and climate change, but reinstated her account a day later.

During the COVID-19 pandemic, Lewis suggested that Baltimore close off certain streets to traffic to encourage outdoor exercise and promote social distancing after multiple other U.S. cities did the same.

== Personal life ==
Lewis lives in the Patterson Park neighborhood of Baltimore. She has not owned a car since October 2014, instead using a Lyft taxi to attend legislative sessions, and as of 2020 is the only car-free lawmaker in the Maryland General Assembly.

== Electoral history ==
Maryland House of Delegates District 46 Democratic primary election, 2018
Party	Candidate	Votes	%
Democratic	Brooke Lierman (incumbent)	8,549	29.0
Democratic	Luke Clippinger (incumbent)	6,904	23.4
Democratic	Robbyn Lewis (incumbent)	6,760	23.0
Democratic	Nate Loewentheil	4,147	14.1
Democratic	Dea Thomas	3,094	10.5

Maryland House of Delegates District 46 election, 2018
Party	Candidate	Votes	%
Democratic	Brooke Lierman (incumbent)	23,711	28.6
Democratic	Luke Clippinger (incumbent)	23,023	27.8
Democratic	Robbyn Lewis (incumbent)	22,582	27.3
Republican	Jeremy Baron	6,879	8.3
Republican	Nicholas Wentworth	6,324	7.6
Write-in		289	0.3

Maryland House of Delegates District 46 election, 2022
Party	Candidate	Votes	%
Democratic	Robbyn Lewis (incumbent)	22,274	30.8
Democratic	Luke Clippinger (incumbent)	22,162	30.7
Democratic	Mark Edelson	22,103	30.6
Republican	Pete Waters	5,492	7.6
Write-in		265	0.4
