= 2026 Maryland Comptroller election =

- November 3, 2026

Nominee	Brooke Lierman	Sonya Dunn
Party	Democratic	Republican
Popular vote	1,404,833	644,262
Percentage	68.5%	31.4%
- Lierman: 50–60% 60–70% 70–80% 80–90% >90% Dunn: 50–60% 60–70% 70–80%
Comptroller before election
Brooke Lierman
Democratic
Elected Comptroller
Brooke Lierman
Democratic

The 2026 Maryland Comptroller election was held on November 3, 2026, to elect the Comptroller of Maryland. Incumbent Democrat Brooke Lierman was re-elected to a second term.

== Democratic primary ==
=== Nominee ===
- Brooke Lierman, incumbent comptroller (2023–present)

=== Endorsements ===
Brooke Lierman

Executive branch officials

- Erek Barron, former U.S. Attorney for the District of Maryland (2021–2025) (candidate's campaign chairman)

Labor unions

- Amalgamated Transit Union Local 689
- American Federation of State, County and Municipal Employees Council 3
- Maryland State & DC AFL-CIO
- Maryland State Education Association
- Service Employees International Union Local 500
- United Food and Commercial Workers Local 1994 MCGEO

Organizations

- CASA in Action
- Maryland League of Conservation Voters
- Maryland Sierra Club
- Moms Demand Action
- Vote Mama

Newspapers

- Baltimore Afro-American

=== Fundraising ===
Campaign finance reports as of June 7, 2026
Candidate	Raised	Spent	Cash on hand
Brooke Lierman (D)	$3,113,575	$1,232,269	$2,040,385
Source: Maryland State Board of Elections

=== Results ===
Democratic primary results
Party	Candidate	Votes	%
Democratic	Brooke Lierman (incumbent)	561,146	100.0
Total votes		561,146	100.0

== Republican primary ==
=== Nominee ===
- Sonya Dunn, businesswoman and journalist

=== Fundraising ===
Campaign finance reports as of June 7, 2026
Candidate	Raised	Spent	Cash on hand
Sonya Dunn (R)	$1,907	$2,029	$(30)
Source: Maryland State Board of Elections

=== Results ===
Republican primary results
Party	Candidate	Votes	%
Republican	Sonya Dunn	160,629	100.0
Total votes		160,629	100.0

== General election ==
=== Fundraising ===
Campaign finance reports as of November 10, 2026
Candidate	Raised	Spent	Cash on hand
Brooke Lierman (D)	$3,814,817	$1,548,041	$2,423,077
Sonya Dunn (R)	$68,056 (Note: $62,587 of this total was self-funded by Dunn)	$44,061	$23,953
Source: Maryland State Board of Elections

=== Results ===
2026 Maryland Comptroller election
Party	Candidate	Votes	%	±%
Democratic	Brooke Lierman (incumbent)	1,404,833	68.49%	+6.93%
Republican	Sonya Dunn	644,262	31.41%	−6.92%
Write-in		1,980	0.10%	-0.01%
Total votes		2,051,075	100.0	N/A

== See also ==
- Elections in Maryland
- 2026 Maryland elections
- 2026 United States elections
