= Brian K. McHale =

American politician

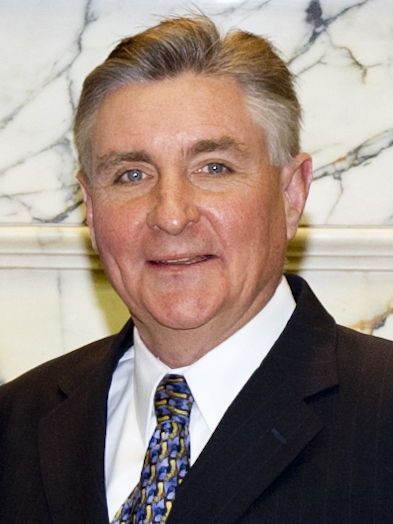
- McHale in 2012

Member of the Maryland House of Delegates from the 46th district
- In office February 5, 1990 – January 14, 2015
- Preceded by: Joseph W. O'Malley
- Succeeded by: Brooke Lierman
- Constituency: Baltimore City

Personal details
- Born: December 9, 1954 (age 71) Baltimore, Maryland, U.S.
- Party: Democratic
- Spouse: Brenda Jo McHale
- Children: 2

Brian K. McHale (born December 9, 1954) is an American politician who represented the 46th legislative district in the Maryland House of Delegates.

== Background ==
Brian McHale was born in Baltimore, Maryland on December 9, 1954. He attended Cardinal Gibbons High School, the Community College of Baltimore, Catonsville Community College and Loyola College. He works as a steamship clerk and is a member of Local 953, International Longshoremen's Association.

== In the legislature ==
A member of House of Delegates since February 5, 1990, Delegate McHale is also the Assistant Majority Whip on the House floor. As a member of the House Economic Matters Committee, he serves on its alcoholic beverages work group and is chairman of its public utilities work group.

=== Legislative notes ===
- Co-sponsored HB 860 (Baltimore City Public Schools Construction and Revitalization Act of 2013). Signed by the Governor on May 16, 2013, the new law approved 1.1 billion dollars to construct new schools in Baltimore City.
- voted for the Clean Indoor Air Act of 2007 (HB359)
- voted for the Healthy Air Act in 2006 (SB154)
- voted for slots in 2005 (HB1361)
- voted against electric deregulation in 1999 (HB703)
- voted for income tax reduction in 1998 (SB750)

=== General election results, 2006 ===
- 2006 Race for Maryland House of Delegates – 46th District

Voters to choose three:

Name	Votes	Percent	Outcome
Peter A. Hammen, Dem.	15,883	29.6%	Won
Carolyn J. Krysiak, Dem.	15,856	29.6%	Won
Brian K. McHale, Dem.	13,921	29.0%	Won
Peter Kimos, Rep.	6,219	11.6%	Lost
Other Write-Ins	154	0.3%	
