= Carolyn J. Krysiak =

American politician (1939–2024)

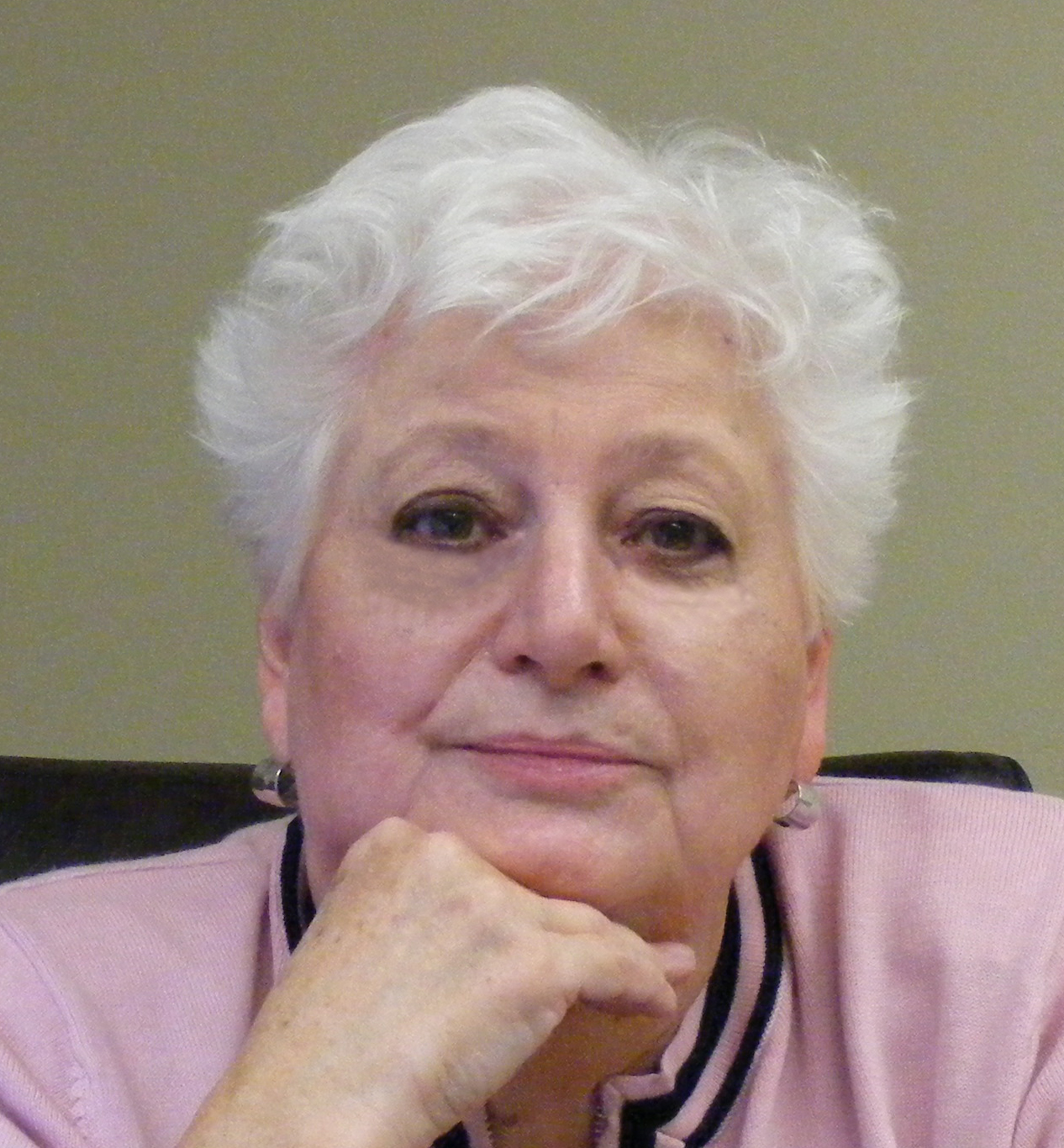
- Krysiak in 2007

Member of the Maryland House of Delegates from the 46th district
- In office January 9, 1991 – January 12, 2011
- Preceded by: Donald G. Hammen
- Succeeded by: Luke Clippinger

Personal details
- Born: August 9, 1939 Baltimore, Maryland, U.S.
- Died: May 8, 2024 (aged 84) Middle River, Maryland, U.S.
- Party: Democratic
- Spouse: Charles J. Krysiak (m. 1962; died 2004)
- Children: 5

Carolyn Josephine Krysiak (née Fabiszak; August 9, 1939 – May 8, 2024) was an American politician who served in the Maryland House of Delegates from 1991 to 2011, representing Maryland's Legislative District 46. A member of the Democratic Party, she held leadership posts as Deputy Majority Leader, Deputy Majority Whip, and Deputy Speaker Pro Tem, and was known for committee work focused on consumer protection, insurance, housing, and workplace and unemployment-related policy.

Born and raised in Fells Point, Krysiak attended Holy Rosary School and later graduated from The Catholic High School of Baltimore.Before entering state politics, she worked in municipal government. In the legislature, Krysiak served for many years on the House’s Maryland House Economic Matters Committee, where she took on a series of subcommittee chair roles over time. She also chaired the House Democratic caucus in her later years and chaired the House Facilities Committee and served as House chair of a workers’ compensation oversight committee.

Krysiak left the House in 2011. She was named one of Maryland’s “Top 100 Women” (2006) and received the Casper R. Taylor, Jr. Founder’s Award (2010), along with commendations recognizing her public service.

== Early life and ancestry ==
Carolyn Josephine Fabiszak was born in Baltimore, Maryland, on August 9, 1939.

She was descended from Polish immigrants and grew up in the Polish-American dominated Fells Point neighborhood. She attended elementary school at Holy Rosary Church's parish school, Holy Rosary School (now closed). She later graduated from The Catholic High School of Baltimore and briefly attended the University of Maryland and the Community College of Baltimore.

== Community involvement ==
Krysiak maintained long-standing ties to Baltimore's Polish-American civic and cultural life. She was a past president of the Polish/American Citizens Committee, Her involvement also extended to major public commemorations within local Polonia. Krysiak was affiliated with multiple Polish-American membership organizations.

She was a member of the Polish-American Congress and the Polish Women's Alliance and an active member of both Polish Home Club, as well as the Polish Heritage Association of Maryland. Krysiak was linked to Polish historical remembrance efforts in Baltimore through the National Katyń Memorial Foundation.

== Legislative career ==
While serving in the Maryland House of Delegates, Krysiak held a series of internal roles and committee assignments. In the mid-1990s, she was Deputy Majority Whip, and a member of the Economic Matters Committee (beginning in 1992) after earlier service on the Judiciary Committee (1991–1992).

By 2003, she was Deputy Speaker Pro Tem and as a member of the Maryland House Economic Matters Committee, including leadership as Chair of the Business Regulation Subcommittee, and membership on the Unemployment Insurance Subcommittee and Alcoholic Beverages Workgroup; she also served on the Maryland House Rules and Executive Nominations Committee.

She later held a joint oversight role as Co-Chair of the Workers' Compensation Benefit and Insurance Oversight Committee.

=== Selected legislation ===
- Motor vehicle insurance—uninsured motorist limits (S.B. 767, 1992; Chapter 641) — Krysiak was publicly associated with the legislative push to make uninsured motorist limits default to a driver’s liability limits unless waived.
- Credit Regulation—Mortgage Lending (H.B. 1337, 2000; Chapter 691) — Krysiak sponsored the bill, which updated regulatory requirements for licensed mortgage lenders and related oversight procedures in state credit regulation law.
- Landlord and Tenant—Tenant Holding Over (H.B. 1031, 2001; Chapter 700) — Krysiak sponsored this measure clarifying how Maryland’s “holding over” provisions apply when tenants remain after a lease term ends.
- Landlord and Tenant—Rent Escrow (H.B. 1215, 2001; Chapter 309) — Krysiak sponsored updates to Maryland’s rent escrow framework, a court-supervised process used in qualifying circumstances when serious property conditions remain unresolved.
- Property and Casualty Insurance—Use of Credit History (H.B. 521, 2002; Chapter 580) — Krysiak sponsored the bill restricting and standardizing how credit history could be used in underwriting and certain premium and policy actions for property and casualty insurance.
- Health Insurance—Mental Illness—Coverage for Residential Crisis Services (H.B. 896, 2002; Chapter 394) — Krysiak was among the sponsors of legislation requiring certain health plans to cover medically necessary residential crisis services for mental illness, expanding covered treatment settings beyond traditional inpatient care.
- Department of Housing and Community Development—Settlement Expense Loan Program—Homebuyer Education (H.B. 1188, 2002; Chapter 271) — Krysiak sponsored a requirement tying certain settlement-expense loan assistance to homebuyer education or housing counseling, aligning state help for closing costs with buyer preparedness.
- Criminal Law—Candy-Like Products Containing Tobacco—Minors (H.B. 32, 2003; Chapter 115) — Krysiak co-sponsored a measure adding candy-like tobacco products to the set of tobacco products explicitly restricted for minors.
- Real Property—Prerequisites to Recording (H.B. 992, 2003; Chapter 189) — Krysiak sponsored adjustments to procedural prerequisites tied to recording certain real property instruments, including provisions affecting Baltimore City under specified circumstances.
- Home Builders—Sales Representative Registration and Home Builder Guaranty Fund (H.B. 1557, 2008; Chapter 481) — Krysiak was among the sponsors of legislation creating a registration/disclosure framework for homebuilder sales representatives and updating administration tied to the Home Builder Guaranty Fund.

== Personal life ==
Krysiak met Charles J. Krysiak at a Catholic Youth Organization dance. They married in 1962, and together they had five children and lived in the Bayview neighborhood of Baltimore. Charles served in the Maryland House of Delegates from 1966 until his resignation in 1979, when Governor Blair Lee III appointed him chair of the Maryland Workers' Compensation Commission.

Krysiak died from cancer on May 8, 2024.

== Electoral history ==
- 1990 Race for Maryland House of Delegates – 46th District

Voters to choose three:

Name	Votes	Percent	Outcome
Anthony M. DiPietro Jr., Dem.	9,233	34%	Won
Cornell N. Dypski, Dem.	9,122	34%	Won
Carolyn Krysiak, Dem.	8,593	32%	Won

- 1994 Race for Maryland House of Delegates – 46th District

Voters to choose three:

Name	Votes	Percent	Outcome
Cornell N. Dypski, Dem.	13,355	31%	Won
Peter A. Hammen, Dem.	12,528	29%	Won
Carolyn Krysiak, Dem.	13,001	30%	Won
Mark C. Miller, Rep.	4,832	11%	Lost

- 1998 Race for Maryland House of Delegates – 46th District

Voters to choose three:

Name	Votes	Percent	Outcome
Cornell N. Dypski, Dem.	12,888	35%	Won
Peter A. Hammen, Dem.	11,771	32%	Won
Carolyn Krysiak, Dem.	12,316	33%	Won

- 2002 Race for Maryland House of Delegates – 46th District

Voters to choose three:

Name	Votes	Percent	Outcome
Peter A. Hammen, Dem.	14,064	28.91%	Won
Carolyn Krysiak, Dem.	14,560	29.93%	Won
Brian K. McHale, Dem.	14,142	29.07%	Won
L. Patrick Dail, Rep.	5,768	11.86%	Lost
Other Write-Ins	118	0.24%	

- 2006 Race for Maryland House of Delegates – 46th District

Voters to choose three:

Name	Votes	Percent	Outcome
Peter Kimos, Rep.	6,219	11.6%	Lost
Peter A. Hammen, Dem.	15,883	29.6%	Won
Carolyn Krysiak, Dem.	15,856	29.6%	Won
Brian K. McHale, Dem.	15,542	29.0%	Won
Other Write-Ins	154	0.3%	

== Awards and honors ==
- “Maryland’s Top 100 Women” (2006)
- Casper R. Taylor, Jr. Founder’s Award (2010) – presented to a sitting delegate for commitment to public service and the integrity of the House.
- United States Senate commendation (2009) – Recognized in remarks entered into the Congressional Record by Ben Cardin, commending her public service on the occasion of her 70th birthday.
