= Peter A. Hammen =

American politician (born 1966)

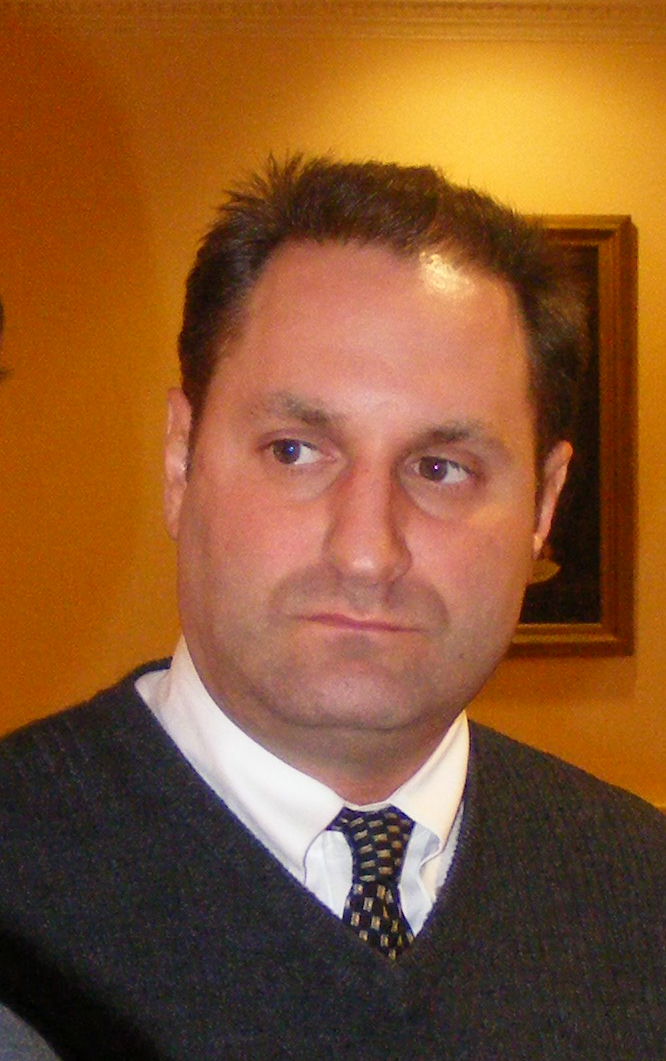

Member of the Maryland House of Delegates from the 46th district
- In office January 11, 1995 – December 2016
- Preceded by: Anthony M. DiPietro Jr.
- Succeeded by: Robbyn Lewis
- Constituency: Baltimore City

Personal details
- Born: July 1, 1966 (age 60) Baltimore, Maryland, U.S.
- Party: Democratic
- Spouse: Michelle

Peter A. Hammen (born July 1, 1966) is an American politician who represented the 46th legislative district in the Maryland House of Delegates. Delegate Hammen was also the Chairman of the House Health and Government Operations Committee.

== Background ==
Born in Baltimore, Maryland on July 1, 1966, Hammen attended the University of Baltimore and earned his B.S. in criminal justice in 1989 and his M.P.A. in public administration in 1993.

== In the legislature ==
Delegate Hammen was a member of House of Delegates from January 11, 1995 to December 2016. He initially served on the House Environmental Matters Committee and then moved to the House Health and Government Operations Committee in 2003. He served as that committee's chairman from 2005 to 2016. He was the House Co-Chair of the Joint Legislative Task Force on Small-Group Market Health Insurance. Hammen resigned his seat in December 2016 to take a job in the administration of Baltimore Mayor Catherine Pugh.

=== Legislative notes ===
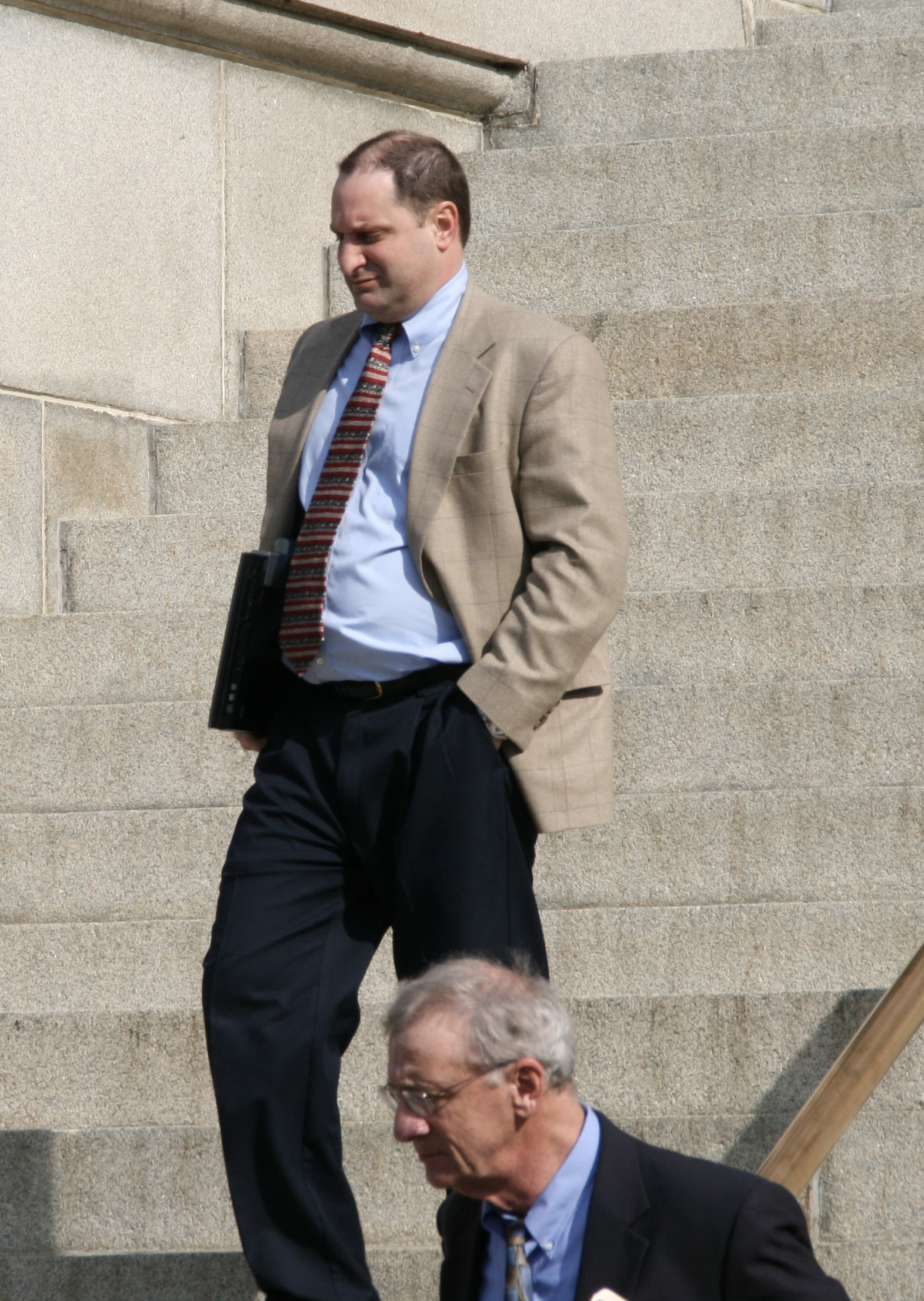
Delegate Hammen leaving the State House in 2011

*Co-sponsored HB 860 (Baltimore City Public Schools Construction and Revitalization Act of 2013). Signed by the Governor on May 16, 2013, the new law approved 1.1 billion dollars to construct new schools in Baltimore City.

- voted for HB6, requiring custodial interrogations in capital cases be recorded(2008)
- voted for Higher Education-Tuition Charges-Maryland High School Students(2007) (HB6)
- co-sponsored House Bill 30 in 2007-Maryland Education Fund - Establishment and Funding
- voted for the Tax Reform Act of 2007(HB2)
- voted in favor of prohibiting ground rents in 2007(SB106)
- voted for the Clean Indoor Air Act of 2007 (HB359)
- voted for Healthy Air Act in 2006 (SB154)
- voted against slots in 2005 (HB1361)
- voted for income tax reduction in 1998 (SB750)

=== General election results, 2006 ===
- 2006 Race for Maryland House of Delegates – 46th District

Voters to choose three:

Name	Votes	Percent	Outcome
Peter A. Hammen, Dem.	15,883	29.6%	Won
Carolyn J. Krysiak, Dem.	15,856	29.6%	Won
Brian K. McHale, Dem.	13,921	29.0%	Won
Peter Kimos, Rep.	6,219	11.6%	Lost
Other Write-Ins	154	0.3%	

== Awards ==
- 2010 Most Influential Maryland Legislators (Top 20)
