= The Block, Baltimore =

Block in Baltimore notable for its strip clubs

The Block
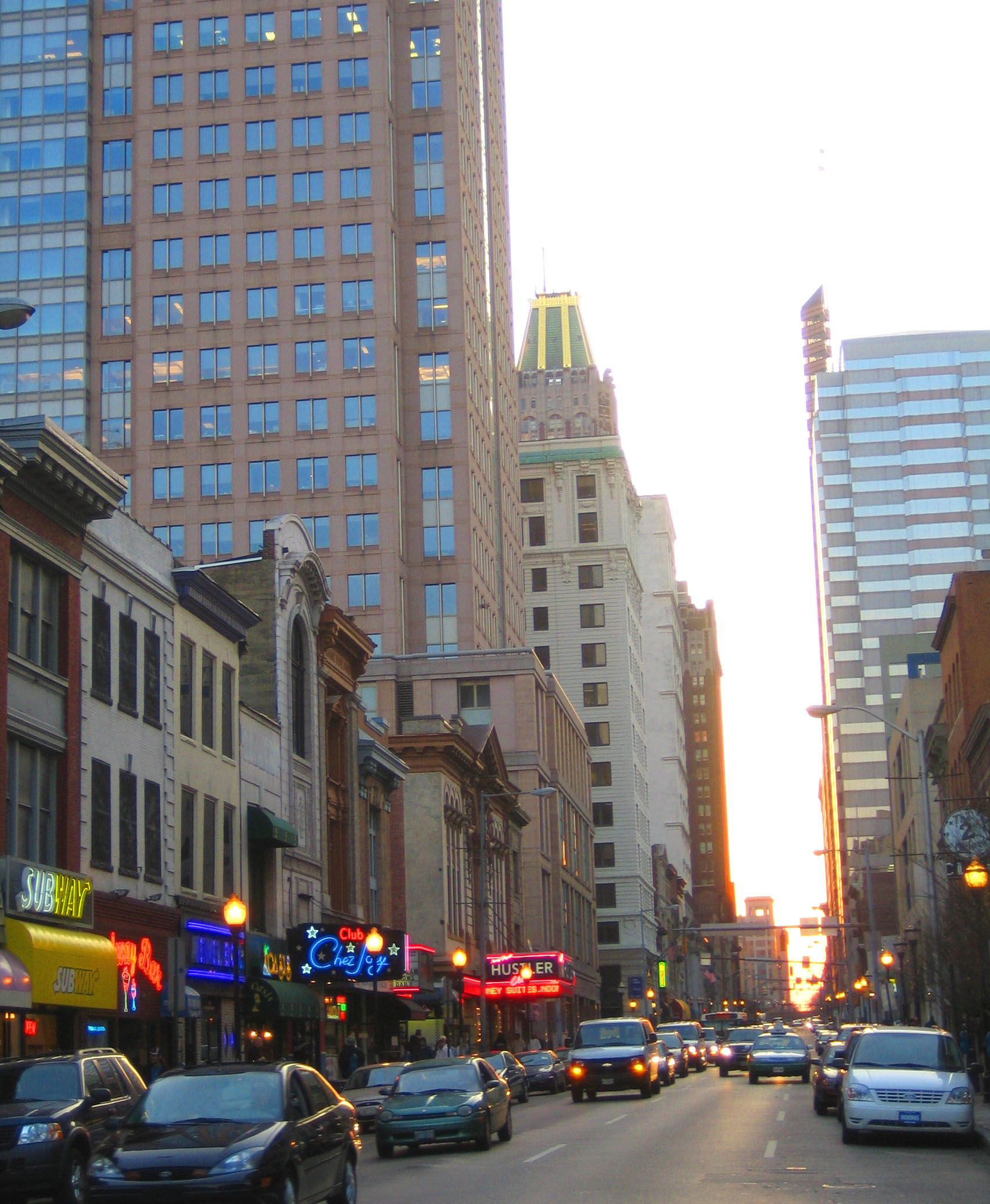
- 400 block of East Baltimore Street.
- Interactive map of The Block
- Location: Baltimore, Maryland, United States
- Coordinates: 39.28978°N 76.60922°W

The Block is a group of buildings on the 400 block of East Baltimore Street in Baltimore, Maryland, containing several strip clubs, sex shops, and other adult entertainment merchants. During the 19th century, Baltimore was filled with brothels, and in the first half of the 20th century, it was famous for its burlesque houses. It was a noted starting point and stop-over for many noted burlesque dancers, including the likes of Blaze Starr.

By the 1950s, the clubs became seedier, as burlesque was replaced by strip clubs and sex shops. The Block of that era is featured prominently in several films, notably Barry Levinson's Liberty Heights and Diner, as well as Steve Yeager's independent feature drama On The Block, with Howard Rollins.

The decades to follow would bring a marked increase in general crime, sex work, and drug dealing, an unusual situation considering the location of Baltimore's Police Headquarters and Central Police District House at the east end of the block. It has been suggested that the police, whose headquarters are located right next to The Block, chose to contain the prostitution and drug dealing in that small section of Baltimore rather than combat it.

The passing decades would see a shrinking of the area. Once several blocks long, stretching almost to Charles Street in the central part of downtown Baltimore, today The Block only stretches about two blocks long from South Street to Gay Street.

A five alarm fire on December 6, 2010, heavily damaged four buildings, including the building that formerly housed the Gayety Theater. The fire was believed to be an act of arson.

== History ==
=== Development of brothels ===
At the beginning of the 19th century, the growing population, low wages, and political corruption in Baltimore led to an environment that allowed sex work to flourish. As the sex industry began to grow, many other businesses and individuals benefited from the proceeds of the industry. Madams and sex workers were "easy targets" due to their low social status, so it was common for them to be extorted by businesses and individuals. This led to the emergence of brothel landlords. Brothel landlords were able to make a large income from the industry without being directly involved, which prevented their reputation from being ruined. It was known that madams had a hefty income, and brothel landlords used this as a way to exploit them. They charged madams more for rent because of the risk associated with renting to a madam and inflated monthly rents since madams had limited options and could afford a higher rent. Due to the stable income that brothels provided for landlords, by the mid-19th century, brothels became an integral part of the real estate speculation in Baltimore. Hatters, sailors, and teachers were all found to be brothel landlords in East Baltimore in the mid-1840s. Marginalized groups at the time, such as Irish and Jewish immigrants, also made it practice to lease properties to madams as a way of ensuring they would always have enough cash on hand in case that they couldn't get credit.

Another consistent source of income for brothels was alcohol sales. In Baltimore, the type of alcohol sold at brothels distinguished their social status. Low-class brothels sold beer and hard liquor, middle-class brothels sold wine, and high-class brothels sold champagne. The sale of alcohol allowed madams to keep their income high while decreasing the pressure clients may have felt to have sex. Clients would sometimes come to brothels and hang out for a while before purchasing sex, and the sale of alcohol allowed brothels to still make money while clients did this.

=== Civil War ===
During the Civil War, Union soldiers that occupied camps surrounding the city became well-known clients of many brothels. Most of the soldiers at these camps were young men eager to spend the large bonuses they just made by joining the war, and as a result, sneaking out to go seek the purchase of sex became a common activity for soldiers. In Baltimore, the demand for sex work greatly increased between 1861 and 1864, and so did the supply. Many women turned towards sex work as a way of making a living while their husbands fought and died in the war. This increase in sex work also increased the number of brothels in Baltimore. New brothels began opening up around the city, specifically in Guilford Alley. Aside from the appeal of sex, these brothels were a comfort to soldiers who were used to dirty camps with no privacy. Madams and sex workers also were an important source of intelligence for the Union soldiers. Confederate sympathizers would come into these brothels, have too much to drink, and share information regarding troop movement and military campaigns. Madams then took this information and passed it onto the Union soldiers that were regular clients. In return, the provost guard would favor these brothels by turning a blind eye and ensuring these brothels would have lower fines, if any.

=== Regulation of sex work ===
The 19th century marked a time in American society where women were expected to be the "moral compass." This included raising their children to be good citizens, being good Christians, and being submissive to their husbands. The sex trade contrasted sharply with these ideas, which resulted in moral reformers who pushed to regulate the trade. Complaints against brothels were increasing in the 1820s, and half of the fines imposed against brothels were given to reporting witnesses as a way of persuading people to turn them in. However, brothels were given preferential treatment over streetwalkers and other forms of sex work. The Baltimore Sun was a critic of the way brothels were handled, claiming that they had enough money that they could repeatedly pay the fines that were being imposed upon them as a way of avoiding legal trouble. In the 1840s, more attention was given to brothel landlords, however the fines weren't enough to outweigh the large income they were making through the sex trade.

Baltimore's police force grew drastically during the mid-19th century, rapidly decreasing the toleration of brothels. Along with the increase in police force came an increase in corruption surrounding brothels. It wasn't uncommon for watchmen to demand sex from workers and madams in exchange for silence, and if the demand wasn't met, they would be arrested.

The end of the Civil War was also met with more concerns regarding sex work due to the health implications it caused during the war, specifically venereal disease. Sex work in Baltimore was now seen as economically, socially, and physically harmful to society. Residents of white-middle-class neighborhoods began protesting the presence of brothels in their neighborhoods, viewing them as degrading and a sign of moral downfall. The public school system also expanded after the Civil War, and as more schools were built around neighborhoods, fear surrounding the idea of having brothels close to schools increased. A few years after the expansion of the public school system, the Maryland House of Delegates passed a bill which made it illegal for brothels to be within four blocks of female schools.

In 1871, the city's Board of Police Commission issued an order that required the arrest of all female street-walkers at night. Officers were given a commission of $2.40 for every streetwalker they arrested, which encouraged officers to exploit workers by repeatedly arresting and releasing them. While this was going on, several organizations with the purpose of confining prostitution were established, including Young Women's Christian Association (1883), Society for the Suppression of Vice of Baltimore City (1888), Maryland Society of Social Hygiene (1908), and Women's Civil League of Baltimore (1911). The Meadow, which was once a red-light district, was now populated by industrial warehouses, and by 1902, brothels ceased to exist here.

=== Decline ===
The decline of brothels began when the middle-class reformers started pushing for brothels to be eradicated from their neighborhoods in the 1870s. Two decades later, Baltimore began developing new spaces of entertainment, such as concert saloons, theaters, and hotels. Some of the most popular leisure spots in Baltimore included Leavitt's Gemote Palace (1864), George Nachman and Thomas Turpin's French Froliques (1877), Joseph Bucholtz's Pacific Garden Theater, and Haymarket Concert Saloon. These spaces attracted many women who were only working part-time as sex workers. By 1910, 40% of the workers in urban industries were women. This is a result of better wages compared to the wages they were offered from doing domestic work in the 19th century. Increased wages for women influenced many women to sell sex as a part-time job instead of full-time to complement the salary they were making in industries. Choosing to sell part-time also meant choosing to sell at these new venues so they would have the independence of determining their own terms and avoiding the reputation that came with working in brothels.

The increase in women in the labor market also made it safer for sex workers who were on the streets late at night. During the 19th century, it was uncommon for a woman to be on the streets late at night unless they were selling sex, which made it easier for officers to arrest them. However, with women now working long hours at their jobs, many were walking home late at night, and police couldn't distinguish between sex workers and women who were just walking home for their industrial jobs. This made it easier for sex workers to blend in on the streets, and they no longer needed to rely on the safety that brothels provided.

Dance halls were added into saloons, theaters, and hotels in the 1890s, which were a craze among youth. These dance halls attracted about 100 people per night, which increased opportunities for sex workers. The new types of living that came with these entertainment spaces allowed sex workers to bring clients back to these newer spaces instead of brothels. The rooms were usually cheaper than brothels, and sex-workers often got their clients to pay.

Amusement parks had the hardest impacts to brothels. In the 1890s, amusement parks opened up with concert saloons, dance floors, alcohol sales, and rides. The parks only cost 5 cents for entry, which made it affordable for sex-workers to pay a daily entry into. The amusements park were a safe space for sex-workers, where there was no police oversight. The alcohol sales attracted many clients away from brothels, as brothels struggled to sell liquor with an increase in police oversight.

Police also gave brothels more regulation. Brothels weren't allowed to have phones, which prevented madams from calling out for girls. They also required every worker to be over 21. The Police Board transferred officers all around the city, which broke down decades-long bribery networks that had been set up between specific officers and madams. The oversight that came with this transfer hit brothels hard and they could no longer sell alcohol.

Baltimore began creating confined red-light districts with the belief that it would be the best way to manage the sex trade in their city. Four blocks on Baltimore Street, now known as the Block, became the designated red-light district in Baltimore after the Great Baltimore Fire in 1904.

In 1913, the Maryland Vice Commission was established. Shortly after, fourteen commissioners went undercover to develop the Maryland Vice Commission Report, detailing sex-work in Baltimore. The report, however, is not entirely accurate and has a clear opinion against brothels. The investigators mainly focused on full-time prostitutes. The average age was 27, and most entered the sex trade in their 20s. Most workers knew how to read and write, even though many of them didn't go to high school. Sex-workers mostly reported feeling content with their lives, and they earned anywhere from $35 to $75 per week, compared to $6.14 per week at their previous jobs. The main reason sex workers went into the job was due to economic hardships, specifically family crisis, such as a spouse getting sick and being unable to work.

The Maryland Vice Commissions Report did not reflect the actual findings. In the report, it claimed that prostitutes lived a "repulsive and perfectly hopeless" life. It reported that sex workers had physical appearances that showed they lacked intelligence, such as their facial expressions. The report concluded that sex-workers were victims of a weak mind and needed to be saved from their work. Although it was found that most workers started in the industry as a result of an economic crisis, the report stated other workers were women who got married at a young age, get bored, and ran off to a "promiscuous" lifestyle.

From the report, the Maryland Vice Commissions formed several recommendations. They recommended that sex work be suppressed for health reasons, claiming that sex wasn't a necessity for men, and that promiscuous sex would lead to mental health issues. The report also discussed that brothels were unsanitary places that led to alcohol abuse and gambling. They viewed sex workers as victims, stating that they needed to protect their virtues and morality, along with protecting the workers themselves due to their mental deficiencies (although the majority of the girls were found to have normal mentalities).

In March 1915, the Maryland Vice Commission recommended that the Police department shut down all brothels within the next year. The report had found 350 brothels in Baltimore in 1914, and by September 1915, all Baltimore brothels had been closed. Once brothels had been closed, a report from the Society for the Suppression of Vice of Baltimore City claimed that Baltimore was now one of the most morally clean cities in the United States. The Block was still standing and consisted of penny arcades and vaudevilles.

=== Sex work after brothels ===
Federal prohibition was repealed in 1933, and shortly after, the Block was filled with strip bars that were occupied by many sex workers. The American Social Hygiene Association conducted two investigations, the first in 1942 and the second in 1951. The 1942, investigation found that bars on the Block illegally promoted sex work. In 1951, the investigation found that there were 21 night clubs on the Block in which sex workers worked. In 1955, night clubs that allowed sex work would be shut down, in compliance with City Judge Reuben Oppenheimer's ruling. An investigation in 1961 that involved undercover police showed that sex could still be purchased in most drinking establishments around Baltimore. Lastly, in 2003, a study done by Eden Savino found that Baltimore is known for its sex industry and sex work is still largely tolerated on the Block. The geography of the Block is also something to note. Baltimore's police station is across the street from the Block, indicating the tolerance of the sex industry in this part of Baltimore.

== Maryland laws regarding sex work ==
In Maryland's Statutes Criminal Law Title 11, the term "prostitution" is used to define sex work. Prostitution is illegal in the state of Maryland, and it is defined as the "performance of a sexual act, sexual contact, or vaginal intercourse for hire". The act of prostitution is a misdemeanor and is subject to up to a year in prison, a fine of up to $500, or both. It is also illegal to run a house of prostitutes, and anyone convicted of doing so is guilty of a misdemeanor and is also subject to up to a year in prison, a fine of up to $500, or both. Lastly, receiving money from prostitutes is illegal as well, such as being a pimp, and anyone convicted to doing so is guilty of a misdemeanor and is subject to up to 10 years in prison, a fine of up to $10,000, or both.

Although the penalties for sex work may seem small in comparison to other crimes, having these specific penalties on one's record are typically extremely harmful. It is a permanent criminal record that can cause someone to lose their job or have difficulties securing houses or a spot at a university or graduate school. These consequences often make it difficult for sex workers to get jobs outside the sex industry.
