= Maryland Legislative District 46 =

American legislative district

Maryland's legislative district 46
- Represents part of the City of Baltimore
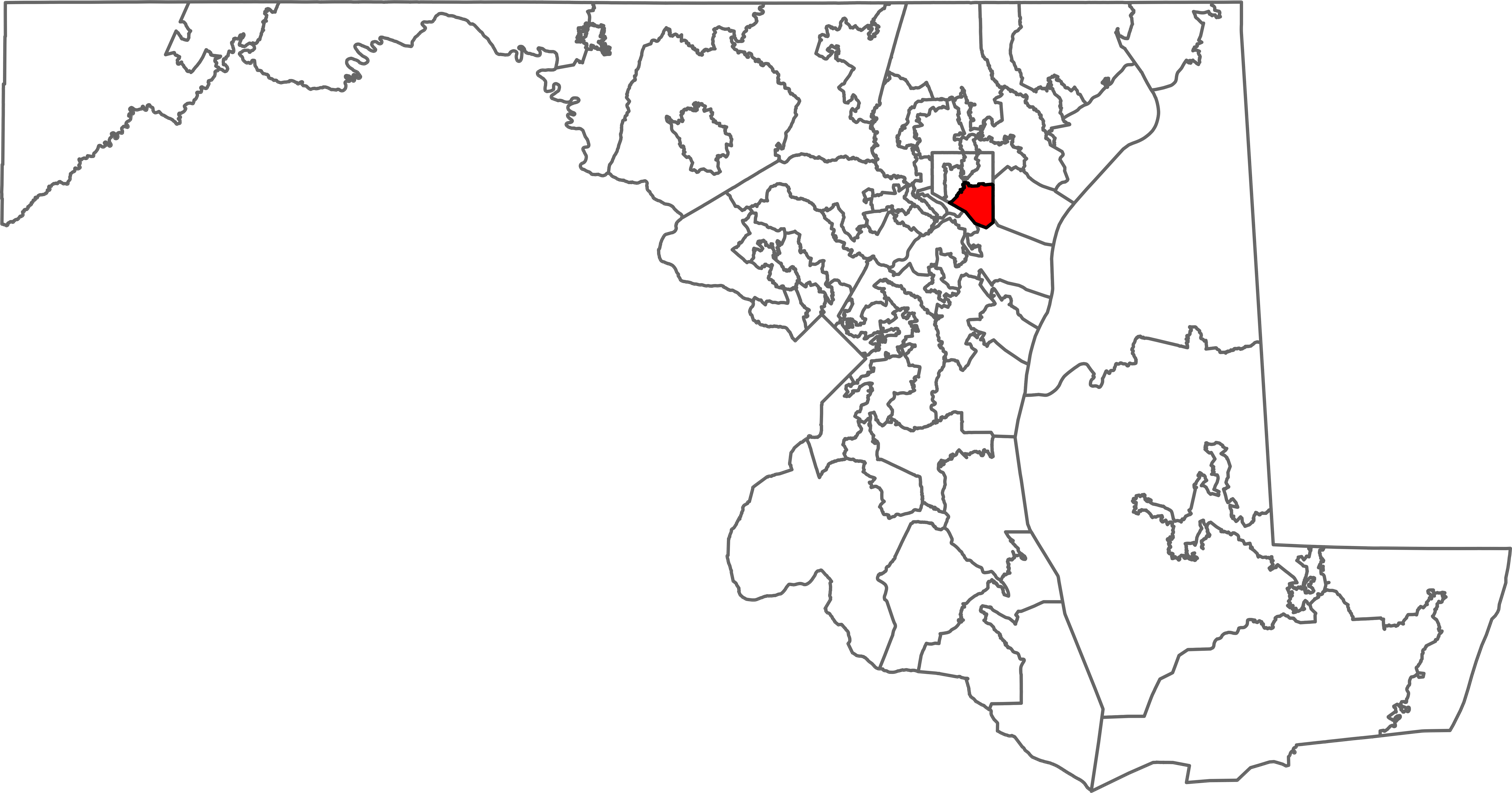
- Senator: Bill Ferguson (D)
- Delegate(s): Luke Clippinger (D); Robbyn Lewis (D); Mark Edelson (D)
- Registration: 65.5% Democratic; 14.2% Republican; 18.7% unaffiliated
- Demographics: 47.2% White; 27.2% Black/African American; 0.8% Native American; 4.0% Asian; 0.0% Hawaiian/Pacific Islander; 12.7% Other race; 8.1% Two or more races; 19.4% Hispanic
- Population (2020): 124,898
- Voting-age population: 101,213
- Registered voters: 74,540

Maryland Legislative District 46 is one of 47 legislative districts in the state of Maryland and is one of the 5 located entirely within Baltimore City. The district is represented by three delegates in the Maryland House of Delegates. It encompasses all or part of at least six city council districts, including the First district, Second district, Tenth district, Eleventh district, Twelfth district and Thirteenth district.

== Demographic characteristics ==
As of the 2020 United States census, the district had a population of 124,898, of whom 101,213 (81.0%) were of voting age. The racial makeup of the district was 58,975 (47.2%) White, 33,946 (27.2%) African American, 949 (0.8%) Native American, 4,987 (4.0%) Asian, 27 (0.0%) Pacific Islander, 15,887 (12.7%) from some other race, and 10,130 (8.1%) from two or more races. Hispanic or Latino of any race were 24,224 (19.4%) of the population.

The district had 74,540 registered voters as of October 17, 2020, of whom 13,962 (18.7%) were registered as unaffiliated, 10,576 (14.2%) were registered as Republicans, 48,847 (65.5%) were registered as Democrats, and 656 (0.9%) were registered to other parties.

== Political representation ==
The district is represented for the 2023–2027 legislative term in the State Senate by Bill Ferguson (D) and in the House of Delegates by Luke Clippinger (D), Robbyn Lewis (D) and Mark Edelson (D).

=== Election results ===
2022 Race for Maryland Senate – 46th District
Name	Votes	Percent	Outcome
Bill Ferguson, Democratic	24,977	84.6%	Won
Emmanuel Digman, Republican	4,486	12.2%	Lost
Other write-ins	50	.2%	Lost

2022 Race for Maryland House of Delegates – 46th District Voters to choose three:
Name	Votes	Percent	Outcome
Luke Clippinger, Democratic	22,162	30.7%	Won
Mark Edelson, Democratic	22,103	30.6%	Won
Robbyn Lewis, Democratic	22,274	30.1%	Won
Pete Waters, Republican	5,492	7.6%	Lost
Other write-ins	265	.4%	Lost

2018 Race for Maryland House of Delegates – 46th District Voters to choose three:
Name	Votes	Percent	Outcome
Luke Clippinger, Democratic	23,023	27.8%	Won
Robbyn Lewis, Democratic	22,582	27.3%	Won
Brooke Lierman, Democratic	23,711	28.6%	Won
Jeremy Baron, Republican	6,879	8.3%	Lost
Nicholas Wentworth, Republican	6,324	7.6%	Lost
Other write-ins	289	.3%	Lost
