= Vacants to Value =

Baltimore, Maryland initiative to incentivize purchases of abandoned homes

Vacants to Value is a Baltimore initiative enacted in 2010 by former Mayor Stephanie Rawlings-Blake to incentivize purchases of abandoned homes in the city. The program offers financial incentives to purchase derelict properties and renovate them.

== Background ==
For decades, Baltimore's local landscape had been blighted by thousands of vacant, boarded up houses, many of them located in some of the city's poorest neighborhoods. This issue was especially prevalent in sections of the city once home to working class families or redlined over decades of segregationist city planning. The city struggled with such problems as far back as the days of mayor William Donald Schaefer, who addressed the problem by offering homes for $1. By the 2000s, the number of vacant homes had tripled, leading to the introduction of the Selling City-Owned Property Efficiency (SCOPE) project, which had facilitated just 130 rehabilitations in its eight year lifespan. Baltimore had also experienced major population decline due to white flight and a dwindling number of blue-collar jobs, with the city's population falling from 950,000 residents in 1950 to 621,000 residents in 2010.

== History ==
=== Launch ===
On November 3, 2010, former Baltimore mayor Stephanie Rawlings-Blake unveiled the Vacants to Value program with the goal of accelerating redevelopment in the city's more than 30,000 vacant properties by cutting bureaucracy and speeding the sales of city-owned properties. Under the plan, the city would allocate over $1 million in homebuyer incentives, including special five-year loans for municipal employees, and implement new, stricter zoning guidelines to commence slumlords and speculators to rehabilitate their properties. The city would provide prospective homebuyers with a $5,000 loan, forgiving 20 percent of the loan each year the buyer stays in the property as their primary residence. The city expected 1,500 of these properties to be renovated in the program's first year.

The Baltimore City Board of Estimates voted 3-2 to approve components of the plan on the same day, with objections coming from City Comptroller Joan Pratt and City Council President Bernard C. Young, who worried that certain provisions would allow officials to auction off city-owned properties without setting a minimum bid. The program's website went live on December 6, 2010, which divided the city into five neighborhoods:

- Central and South Districts
- North and Northwest Districts
- North and Northeast Districts
- West and Southwest Districts
- East and Southeast Districts

In 2015, the Baltimore City Council passed legislation that would allow the city to take over abandoned homes when such properties begin to show signs of neglect, expanding the circumstances in which the city could force the sale of neglected properties.

In 2016, Rawlings-Blake announced "The Green Network Plan", which would provide a blueprint for creating new parks, gardens, and trails in place of once abandoned spaces. The initiative received funding from the National Park Service and the Maryland Department of Natural Resources, who sought to use the restored green spaces to monitor water quality and start educational programs. In 2018, a 21-page plan for the Baltimore Green Network, which included connecting community spaces such as schools and homes with new parks and green spaces, was unveiled by former Mayor Catherine Pugh.

Between 2017 and 2022, the Baltimore City Council has seen various unsuccessful proposals to bring back the Dollar House program.

=== Project C.O.R.E. ===
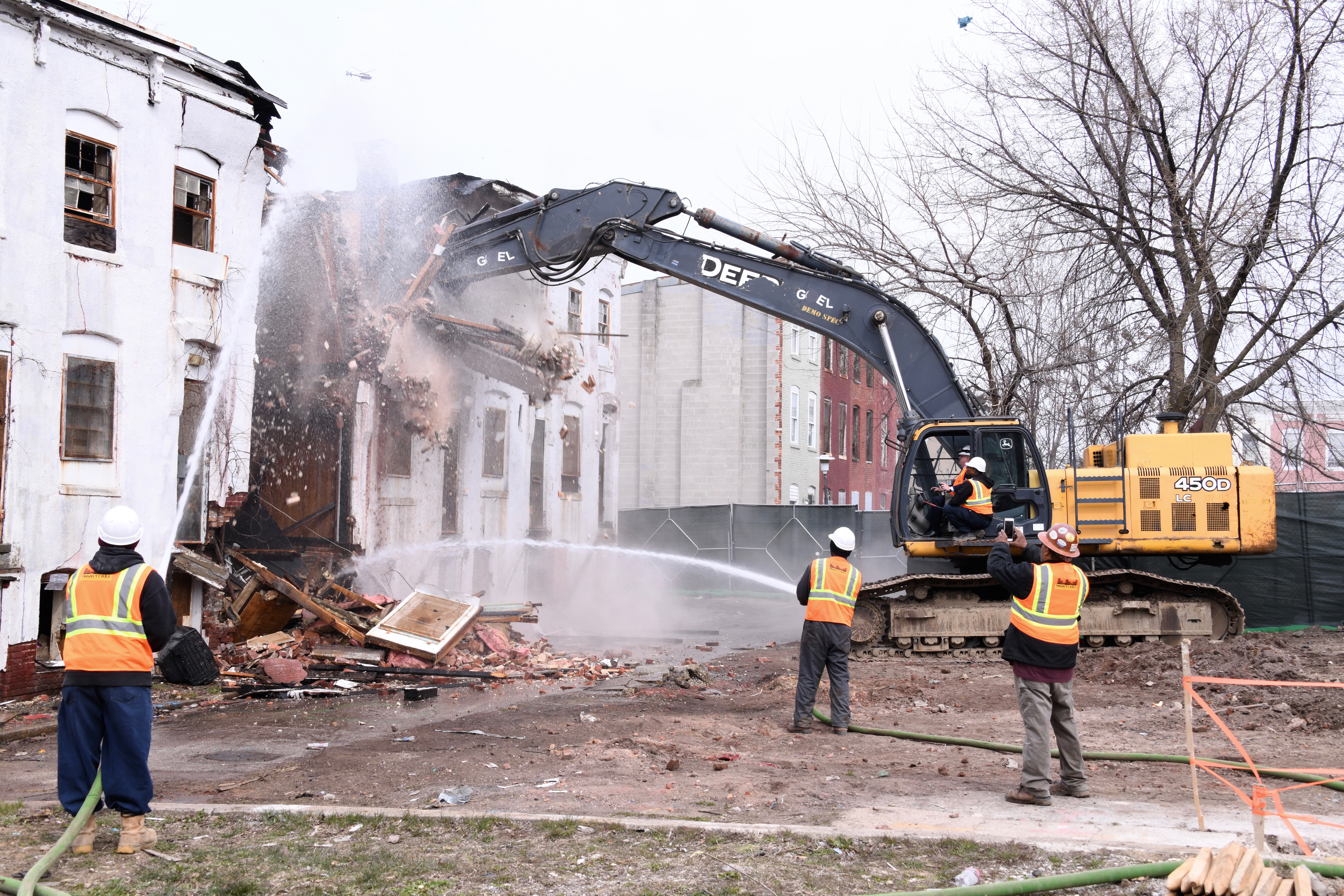
Governor Larry Hogan demolishing vacant buildings in Sandtown-Winchester, 2018

In January 2016, Governor Larry Hogan announced Project C.O.R.E. (Creating Opportunities for Renewal and Enterprise), a $700 million plan to tear down and replace thousands of vacant buildings in Baltimore with new developments, pledging $94 million over four years to demolish 4,000 vacant properties citywide and $600 million in subsidies to encourage redevelopment. Many of the awards provided through CORE funding went to projects in West Baltimore, a part of the city that was overlooked in earlier revitalization efforts. The initiative started out slow, having only razed 53 of the 370 properties identified for demolition by the end of 2016, but this was associated with agencies developing best practices in response to neighborhood complaints about previous razing jobs, including environmental protocols, salvage requirements, and community notification. Between 2016 and 2019, Project C.O.R.E. had helped demolish 4,000 vacant buildings and saw the revitalization of old buildings for workforce development activities and educational purposes.

=== Challenges ===
The biggest challenge the city faced in the early months of the launch of the Vacants to Value program was dealing with the 10,000 vacant structures that were past the point of rehabilitation and require demolition. The city's budget meant that, with the cost of razing a single home in the tens of thousands of dollars, it could not afford to take down many homes. Since 2010, the city has demolished more than 2,700 vacant buildings – typically completing about 300 demolitions a year – and rehabilitated another 4,200. From 2013 to 2016, the city spent nearly $22 million to tear down 1,500 abandoned homes, an increase from the $2.5 million the city previously spent each year on demolition. The city's 2018 fiscal year budget allocated about $10 million a year for demolitions.

The city also faced lengthy legal processes to take control of these buildings, which created new vacant homes as people continued to leave Baltimore. Situations where the city and land owners could not agree on a price for acquiring vacant properties would end up in court, which further delays the renovation process.

Many of the city's initial goals for the Vacants to Value program were "overly ambitious", with city officials tearing down 800 houses from the fall of 2010 to August 2015 – with only 300 of those homes having occupancy permits – after setting goals to tear down 1,500 vacant homes in the program's first year. According to the Abell Foundation report, the number of vacant homes on the city's list grew from 16,000 to 16,636 in the first four years the program, despite the city's best efforts to decrease this number. A 2017 report from the Center for Community Progress found that over the same period, the number of city-owned vacant properties declined from 3,282 to 2,620. Experts blame the high stock of vacant property in Baltimore on property owners abandoning properties before some abandoned buildings were neglected, whether that's because of the homeowners moving out of the city or people dying. In 2019, the city announced a $50 million project to demolish more than 2,000 vacants by summer 2020 in an effort to drive the city's number of abandoned buildings below 15,000 for the first time in a decade in a half. As of February 2022, the current number of vacant properties in Baltimore is 15,032.

== Results ==
A 2015 report from the Abell Foundation called Vacants to Value "the city's most ambitious blight-elimination effort in 40 years", determining that the program helped transform several neighborhoods, including Oliver, McElderry Park, and Greenmount West. City officials said that the initiative had brought in more than $107 million in private investment and spurred the demolition or rehabilitation of 3,000 vacant homes. However, the report also found that Vacants to Value was not responsible for hundreds of buildings included in the city's list of successes. Abell researchers could find no building permits to prove repairs were made for 200 houses included in this list, and in nearly 300 cases, houses were purchased privately and not involved in Vacants to Value.
