= Stephanie Rawlings-Blake =

Mayor of Baltimore from 2010 to 2016

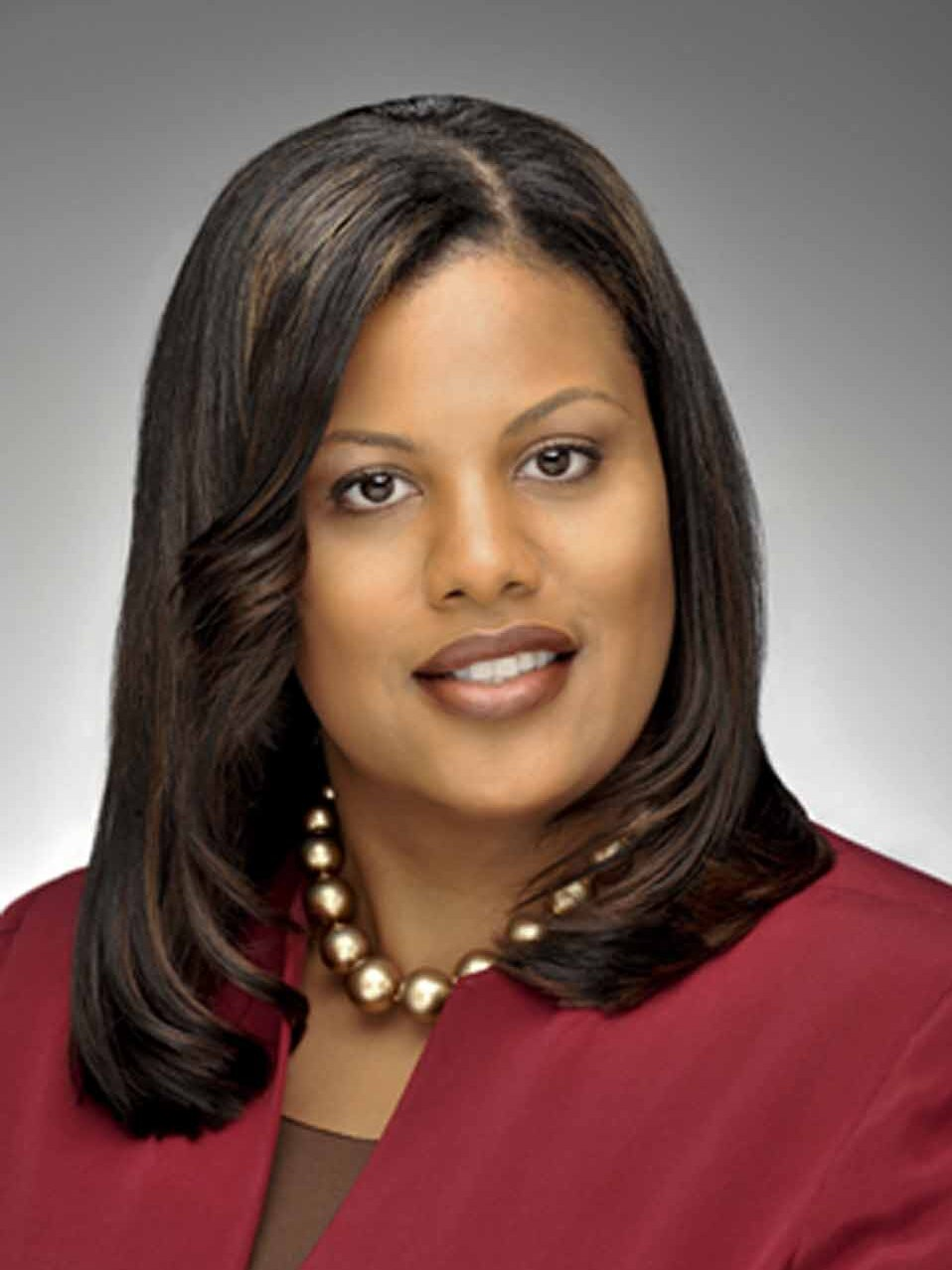
- Rawlings-Blake in 2013

Secretary of the Democratic National Committee
- In office January 22, 2013 – February 25, 2017
- Chair: Debbie Wasserman Schultz; Donna Brazile (acting)
- Preceded by: Alice Germond
- Succeeded by: Jason Rae

50th Mayor of Baltimore
- In office February 4, 2010 – December 6, 2016
- Preceded by: Sheila Dixon
- Succeeded by: Catherine Pugh

73rd President of the United States Conference of Mayors
- In office December 21, 2015 – July 22, 2016
- Preceded by: Kevin Johnson
- Succeeded by: Mick Cornett

President of the Baltimore City Council
- In office January 17, 2007 – February 4, 2010
- Preceded by: Sheila Dixon
- Succeeded by: Jack Young

Vice President of the Baltimore City Council
- In office 1999–2007
- President: Sheila Dixon
- Succeeded by: Edward Reisinger

Member of the Baltimore City Council
- In office 1995–2007
- Succeeded by: Sharon Green Middleton
- Constituency: 5th district (1995–2004); 6th district (2004–2007)

Personal details
- Born: Stephanie C. Rawlings; March 17, 1970 (age 56) Baltimore, Maryland, U.S.
- Party: Democratic
- Spouse: Kent Blake (separated)
- Relations: Pete Rawlings (Father)
- Children: 1
- Education: Oberlin College (BA); University of Maryland, Baltimore (JD)

Stephanie C. Rawlings-Blake (born March 17, 1970) is an American politician and attorney who served as the 50th Mayor of Baltimore from 2010 to 2016, the second woman to hold that office. She has also served as secretary of the Democratic National Committee and as president of the United States Conference of Mayors.

== Early life ==
Born Stephanie Cole Rawlings on March 17, 1970, in Baltimore City, Maryland, to Nina Rawlings (née Cole) and Pete Rawlings, Rawlings-Blake grew up in the city's Ashburton neighborhood. Her mother is a retired pediatrician and her father is a former member of the Maryland House of Delegates, where he represented the 40th district, Baltimore City. She had two siblings: one brother, brother Wendell Rawlings and one sister, Lisa Rawlings.

== Education ==
Rawlings-Blake attended Western High School, the oldest public all-girls high school in the United States. She was elected vice president of her freshman class and president of her sophomore class. She graduated in 1988.

Rawlings-Blake attended Oberlin College in Ohio, graduating in 1992 with a B.A. in political science. She later returned to Baltimore to attend the University of Maryland School of Law, where she earned her Juris Doctor degree in 1995. She was admitted to the Maryland bar in 1996 and to the federal bar in 1997.

Rawlings-Blake is an alumna of the Baltimore Chesapeake Bay Outward Bound Center and a member of Alpha Kappa Alpha sorority, Epsilon Omega chapter. She is a former at-large member of the Alliance of Black Women Attorneys.

== Political career ==
=== Early career ===
From 1990 to 1998, Rawlings-Blake served on the Baltimore City Democratic State Central Committee, and in the 1990s she served as the Annapolis lobbyist for the Young Democrats of Maryland.

In 1997 Rawlings-Blake began serving as an administrative law attorney with the Baltimore City office of the Maryland Legal Aid Bureau, which offers free civil legal services to Maryland's low-income residents. She went on to serve as a staff attorney with the Maryland Office of the Public Defender in its Southern District (District 1, Baltimore City) from 1998 to 2006.

=== Baltimore City Council ===
In 1995, Rawlings-Blake became the youngest person ever elected to the Baltimore City Council. She represented the council's District 5 from 1995 to 2004 and District 6 from 2004 to 2007 (following a redistricting of the council).

From 1999 to 2007, Rawlings-Blake served as vice president of the Baltimore City Council.

==== City council president ====
Rawlings-Blake became President of the Council on January 17, 2007, when then-City Council President Sheila Dixon became mayor. The Charter of Baltimore City states: "If it becomes necessary for the president of the City Council to fill the unexpired term of the mayor…the City Council, by a majority vote of its members, shall elect a new president for the unexpired term."

On June 14, 2007, Rawlings-Blake announced that she would seek a full four-year term as council president. Her platform included improving education and reducing crime in the city. Rawlings-Blake won the Democratic primary with 49 percent of the vote. In the general election, Rawlings-Blake defeated her only opponent with 82 percent of the vote.

=== Mayor of Baltimore ===
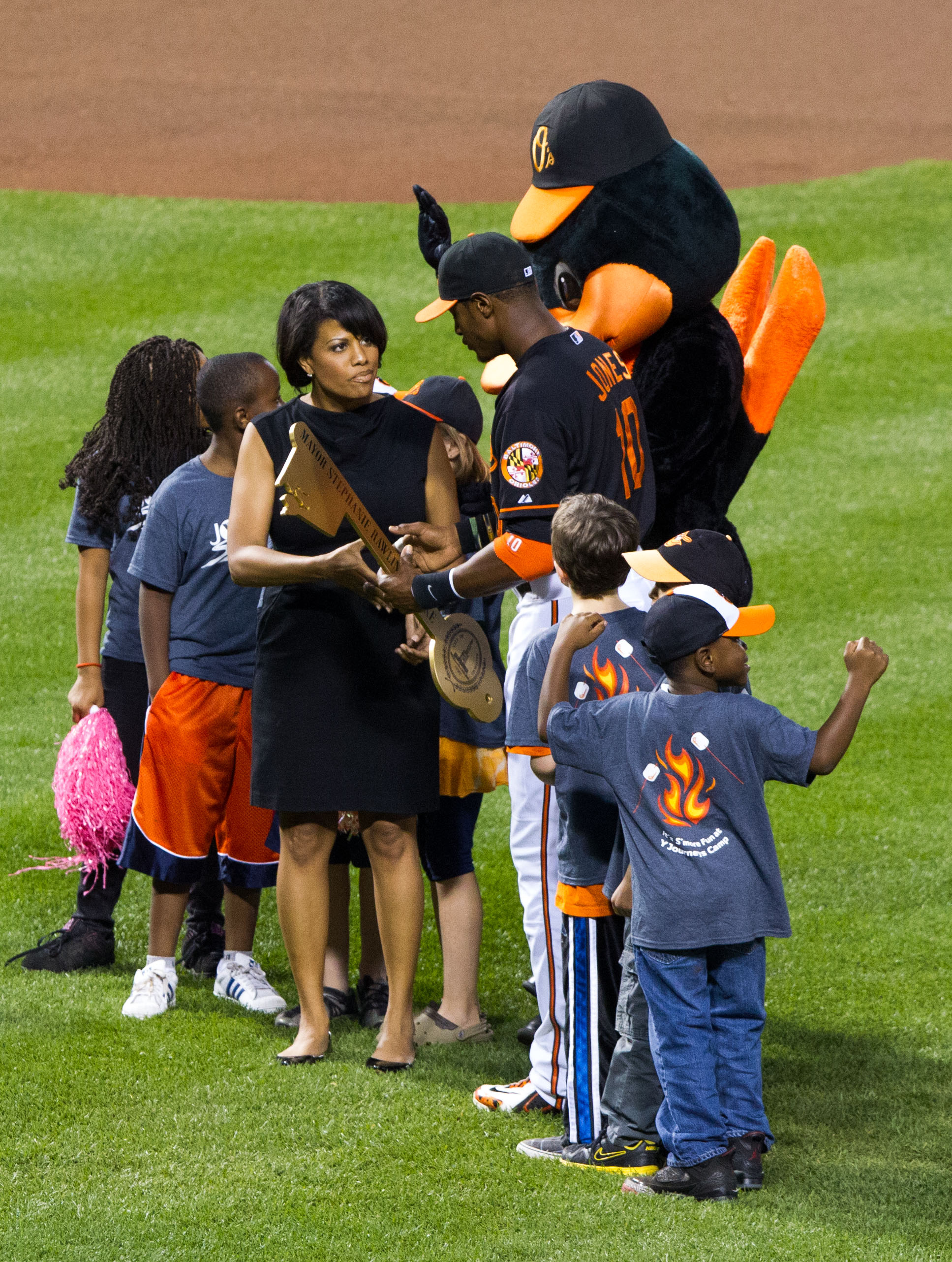
Rawlings-Blake at a Baltimore Orioles game in 2012

On January 6, 2010, then-Mayor Sheila Dixon announced, following her conviction for embezzlement, that she would resign from office, effective February 4, 2010. Under the Baltimore City charter, whenever the mayor's office becomes vacant, the sitting city council president automatically ascends to the mayor's post for the balance of the term. Consequently, following Dixon's resignation on February 4, 2010, Rawlings-Blake became mayor of Baltimore City.

Rawlings-Blake went on to seek a full term as mayor in the 2011 mayoral election. In the 2011 Democratic primary, the real contest in this overwhelmingly Democratic city, she won 52% of the vote. She then won the general election in November 2011, receiving 84% of the vote. In her February 2012 State of the City address, she stated that her goal as mayor was to grow Baltimore by 10,000 families.

In September 2015, Rawlings-Blake announced that she would not seek re-election in the 2016 mayoral election, stating, "It was a very difficult decision, but I knew I needed to spend time focused on the city's future, not my own".

==== 2015 Baltimore protests ====
Rawlings-Blake received criticism for her handling of the 2015 Baltimore protests that were prompted by the death of Freddie Gray on April 19, 2015. Several days of peaceful protests escalated into violence in the late afternoon of April 25, 2015. After about three hours of violence, looting, and destruction of property throughout the city, Rawlings-Blake requested the assistance of the Maryland National Guard. Two days later, on April 27, as unrest continued, she requested that the governor of Maryland, Larry Hogan, declare a state of emergency, and on April 28, she asked for further assistance from the National Guard. Rawlings-Blake was criticized for waiting too long before asking the state for help. Hogan claimed that she did not return his repeated phone calls for two hours after the riots started on April 25 and that he could not enact a state of emergency or deploy the National Guard without a formal request from the mayor. On April 28, Hogan said he didn't want to "second-guess the mayor's decision" and that he knew "she was doing the best that she could".

In a press conference addressing the riots, Rawlings-Blake stated, "It’s a very delicate balancing act. Because while we try to make sure that they were protected from the cars and other things that were going on, we also gave those who wished to destroy space to do that as well. And we worked very hard to keep that balance and to put ourselves in the best position to de-escalate." The phrase "we also gave those who wished to destroy space to do that as well" was taken out of context by some conservative-leaning news sources to imply that the mayor was giving permission to protestors to destroy property. Some conservative outlets disagreed with that interpretation, however, such as Breitbart News contributor John Sexton, who wrote, "when you look at the full context, it’s clear the Mayor meant something different (though it’s also true she didn’t say it very clearly)".

Rawlings-Blake clarified her remarks in a Facebook post, writing, "I did not instruct police to give space to protesters who were seeking to create violence or destruction of property. Taken in context, I explained that, in giving peaceful demonstrators room to share their message, unfortunately, those who were seeking to incite violence also had space to operate."

During a subsequent press conference, Rawlings-Blake said, "Too many people have spent generations building up this city for it to be destroyed by thugs who, in a very senseless way, are trying to tear down what so many have fought for", which led to even more criticism from people who felt her use of the term "thugs" was racially charged, such as Baltimore City Council member Carl Stokes, who compared her use of the word "thug" to the "n-word". Rawlings-Blake apologized two days later on Twitter.

=== Secretary of the Democratic National Committee ===
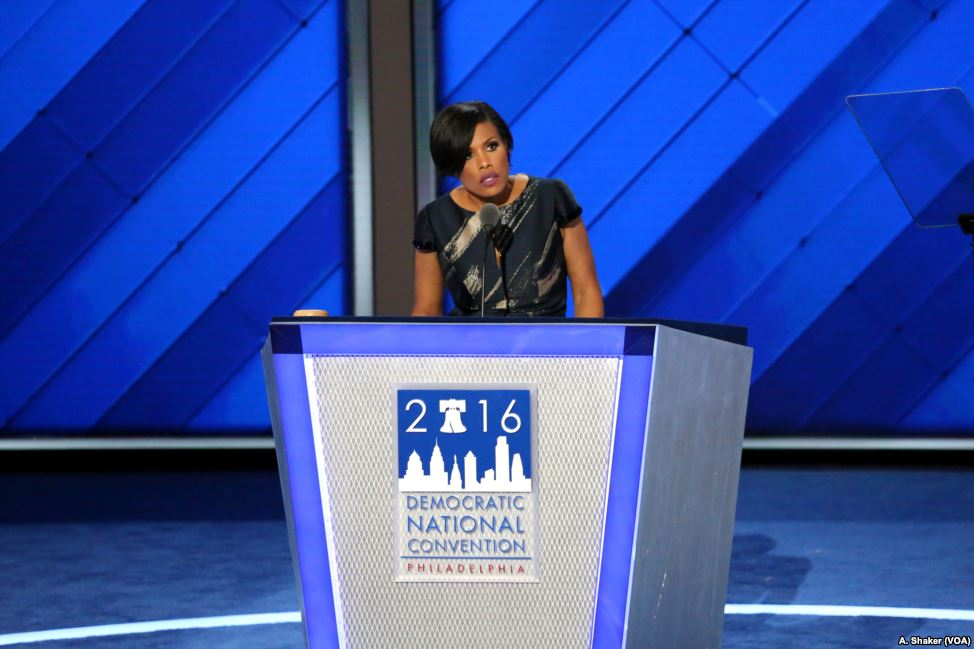
Rawlings-Blake at the 2016 Democratic National Convention

Rawlings-Blake was appointed secretary of the Democratic National Committee in January 2013, serving under Debbie Wasserman-Schultz. Rawlings-Blake gaveled in the 2016 Democratic National Convention, where she served as one of 23 superdelegates from Maryland; Rawlings-Blake did not endorse any candidate at the convention.

== Political positions and policies ==
=== City budget ===
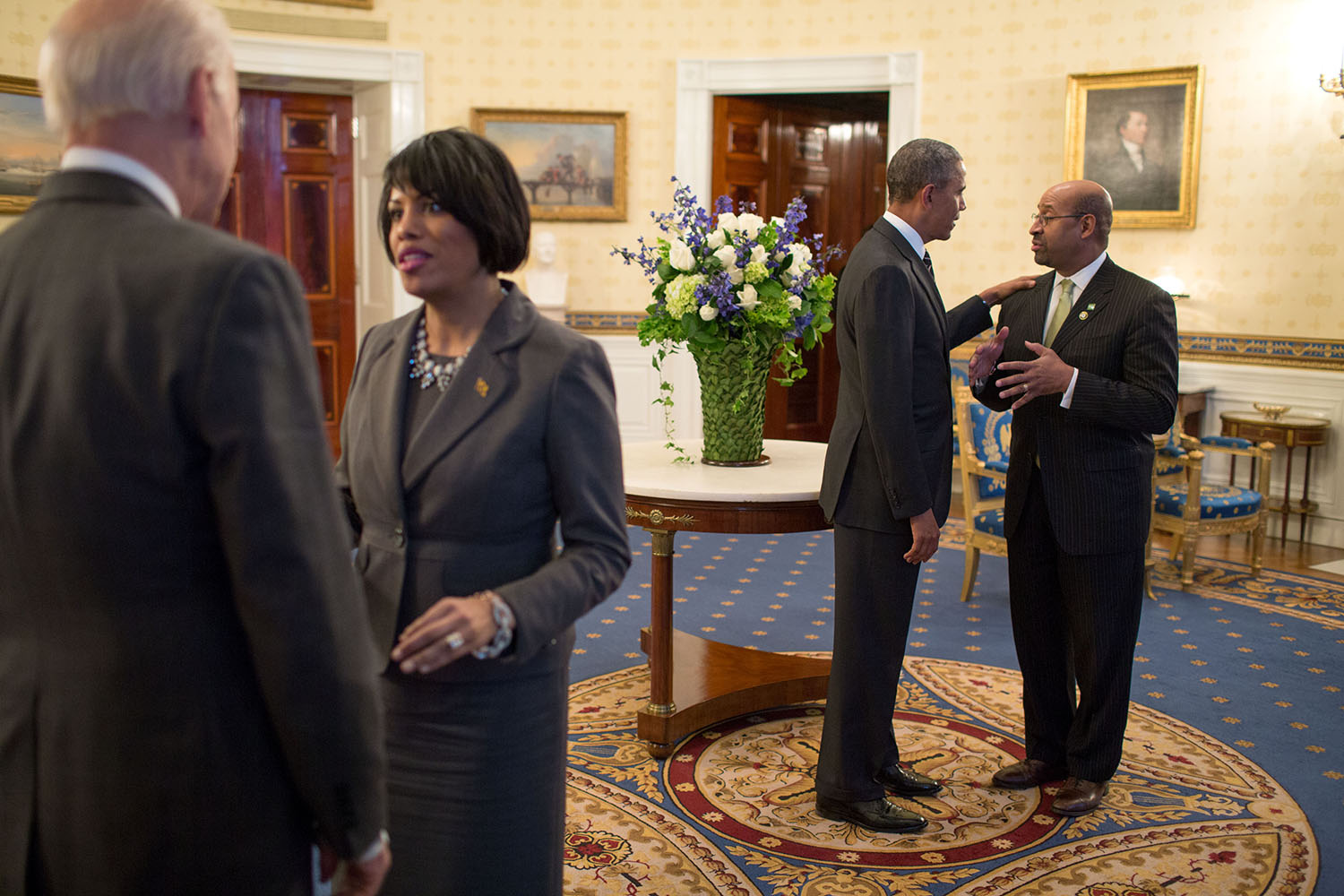
Rawlings-Blake at the White House speaking with Vice President Biden

On February 6, 2013, Baltimore City released a 10-year fiscal forecast, which the city had commissioned from independent financial consulting firm Public Financial Management, Inc. (PFM) at Rawlings-Blake's direction. The report outlined a number of fiscal obstacles facing the City in subsequent years.

To address the challenges outlined in the fiscal forecast, Rawlings-Blake presented Change to Grow: A Ten-Year Financial Plan for Baltimore, the city's first long-range financial plan. Among other major reforms, the plan outlined proposed changes to Baltimore City's employee pensions and benefits system, City tax structure, and overall municipal operations. By implementing elements of this plan, Baltimore City has been able to extinguish $300 million from a cumulative budgetary shortfall forecasted at approximately $750 million.

=== Urban blight ===
When Rawlings-Blake took office Baltimore City had approximately 16,000 vacant buildings, resulting from a half-century of population decline. In November 2010, in an effort to reduce urban blight caused by vacant structures, Rawlings-Blake introduced the Vacants to Value (V2V) initiative. The initiative's strategies include streamlining code enforcement and disposition of City-owned vacant properties, offering incentives targeted at home buyers who purchase previously vacant homes, supporting large-scale redevelopment in deeply distressed areas, and targeting demolition to improve long-term property values.

In 2013, Baltimore Housing won the Urban Land Institute's Robert C. Larson Workforce Housing Public Policy Awards for the V2V initiative. V2V has also been recognized by the Obama administration, the Clinton Global Initiative, the U.S. Conference of Mayors, ABCD Network, and the Financial Times.

== 2025 lawsuit ==
On January 8, 2025, the Old National Bank sued Rawlings-Blake for failing to repay a US$2.1 million 10-year business loan for Gulf Coast Technology Corporation and Buy MBE, which she was the president and manager of, respectively. The loan was issued on November 8, 2023, with an interest rate of prime plus three percent and monthly payments of US$28,000. While Rawlings-Blake made early payments, the payments ended in May 2023 and she did not respond to two demand letters from the Old National Bank.

== Other activities ==
In 2015, Rawlings-Blake became the first mayor to appear in the musical Chicago, appearing in a one-night performance on March 4, 2015, as an ensemble performer throughout the night.

=== Awards and honors ===
In 2007 and 2011, Rawlings-Blake was honored by the Daily Record as one of Maryland's Top 100 Women.

Rawlings-Blake was named as a Shirley Chisholm Memorial Award Trailblazer by the National Congress of Black Women, Washington, DC Chapter (2009) and as an Innovator of the Year by the Maryland Daily Record (2010). In 2013, she was included in The Baltimore Sun's list of 50 Women to Watch.

She is a recipient of the Fullwood Foundation Award of Excellence (2010), the National Forum for Black Public Administrators' Distinguished Leadership Award (2012), the Maryland State Senate's First Citizen Award (2013), and the Baltimore Black Pride ICONS We Love Award (2013).

In 2014, Vanity Fair included Rawlings-Blake in its list of the Top 10 Best-Dressed Mayors.

== Electoral history ==
=== 2003 ===
2003 Baltimore City Council, District 6, Democratic Party primary election
Party	Candidate	Votes	%
Democratic	Stephanie Rawlings-Blake	3,679	49%
Democratic	Charese Williams	2,765	37%
Democratic	Seth A. Rosenberg	487	6%
Democratic	Vincent "Rick" Fullard	251	3%
Democratic	Kelley C. Brohawn	243	3%
Democratic	Kevin L. Williams	132	2%

2003 Baltimore City Council, District 6, general election
Party	Candidate	Votes	%
Democratic	Stephanie Rawlings-Blake	11,325	91%
Republican	Melvin A. Bilal	1,151	9%

=== 2007 ===
2007 Baltimore City Council, President, Democratic Party primary election
Party	Candidate	Votes	%
Democratic	Stephanie Rawlings-Blake	42,078	49%
Democratic	Michael Sarbanes	32,988	39%
Democratic	Kenneth Harris Sr.	9,927	12%
Democratic	Charles U. Smith	369	0%

2007 Baltimore City Council, President, general election
Party	Candidate	Votes	%
Democratic	Stephanie Rawlings-Blake	34,626	82%
Green	Maria Allwine	7,174	17%
	Write-in	365	1%

=== 2011 ===
2011 Mayor, Baltimore, Democratic Party primary election
Party	Candidate	Votes	%
Democratic	Stephanie Rawlings-Blake	38,829	52%
Democratic	Catherine Pugh	18,797	25%
Democratic	Otis Rolley III	9,415	13%
Democratic	Joseph T. Landers	5,089	7%
Democratic	Frank M. Conaway Sr.	2,095	3%
Democratic	Wilton Lloyd Wilson	235	0%

2011 Mayor, Baltimore, general election
Party	Candidate	Votes	%
Democratic	Stephanie Rawlings-Blake	40,125	84%
Republican	Alfred V. Griffin	6,108	13%
	write-in	1,270	3%

== See also ==
- List of mayors of the 50 largest cities in the United States
