= 2016 Baltimore mayoral election =

- November 8, 2016
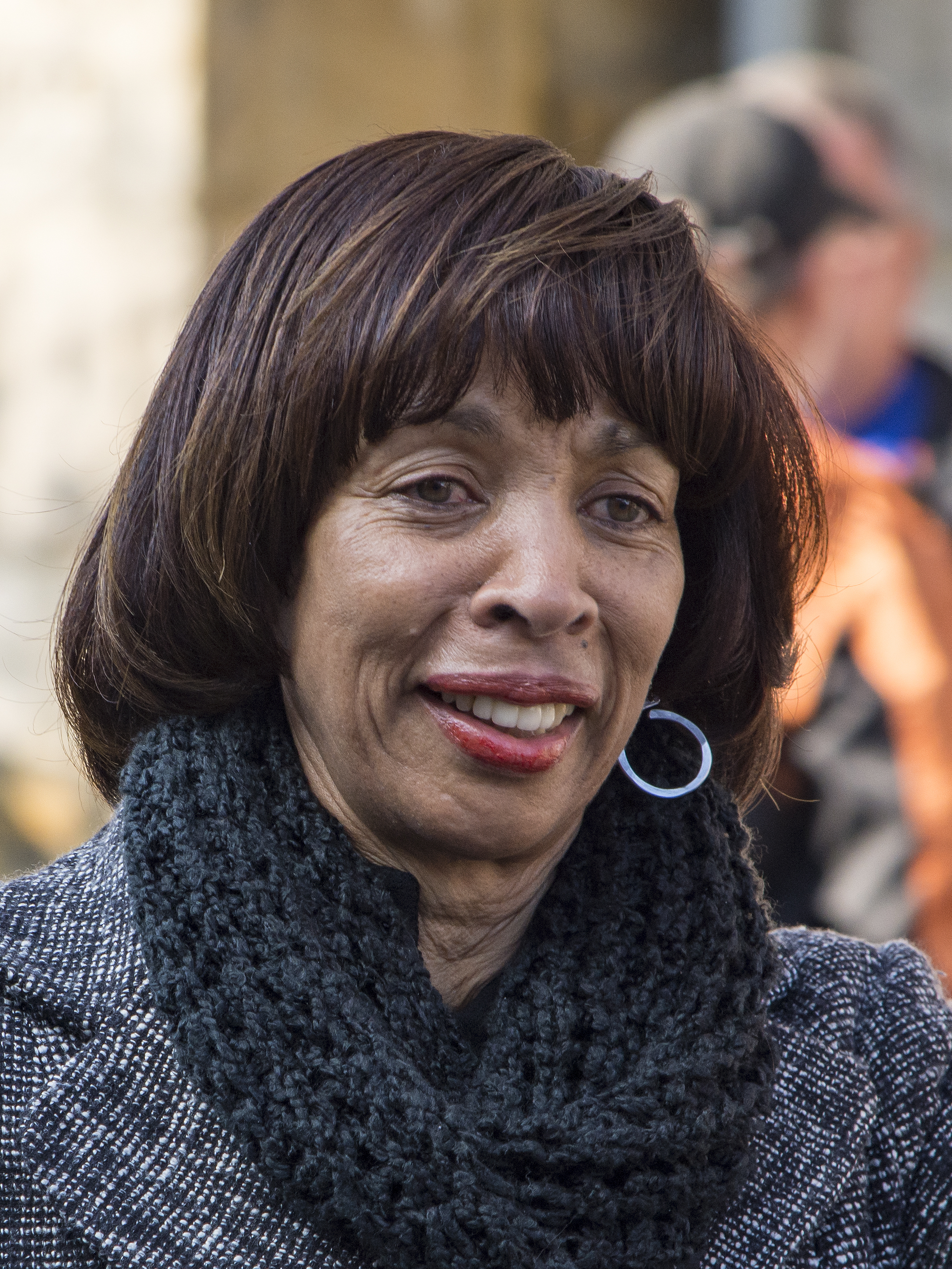

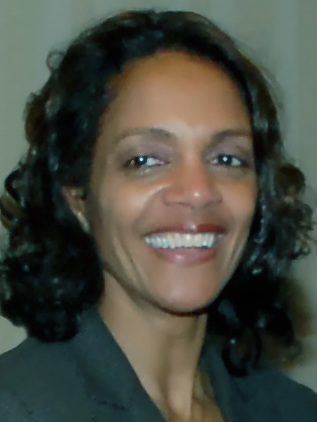

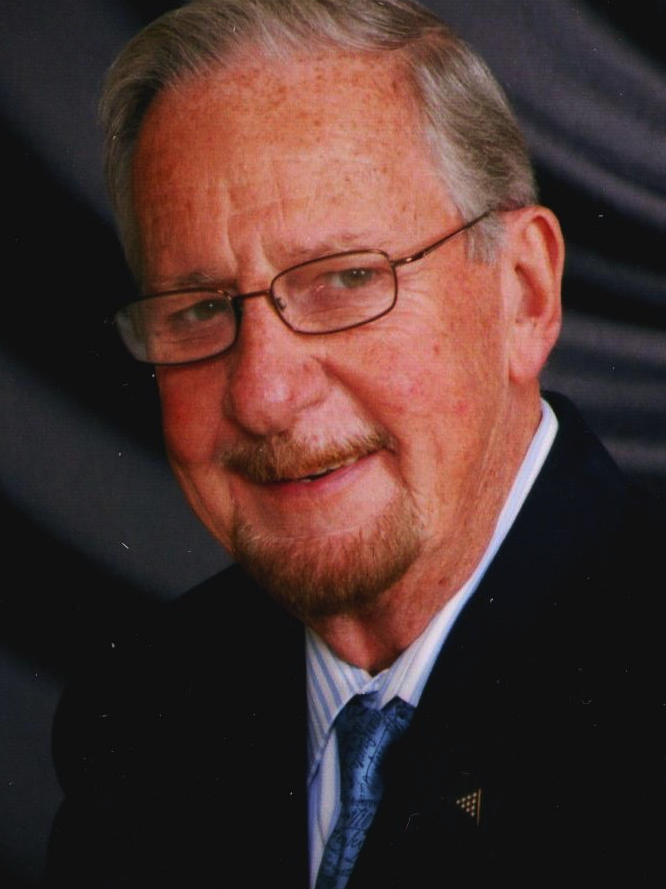

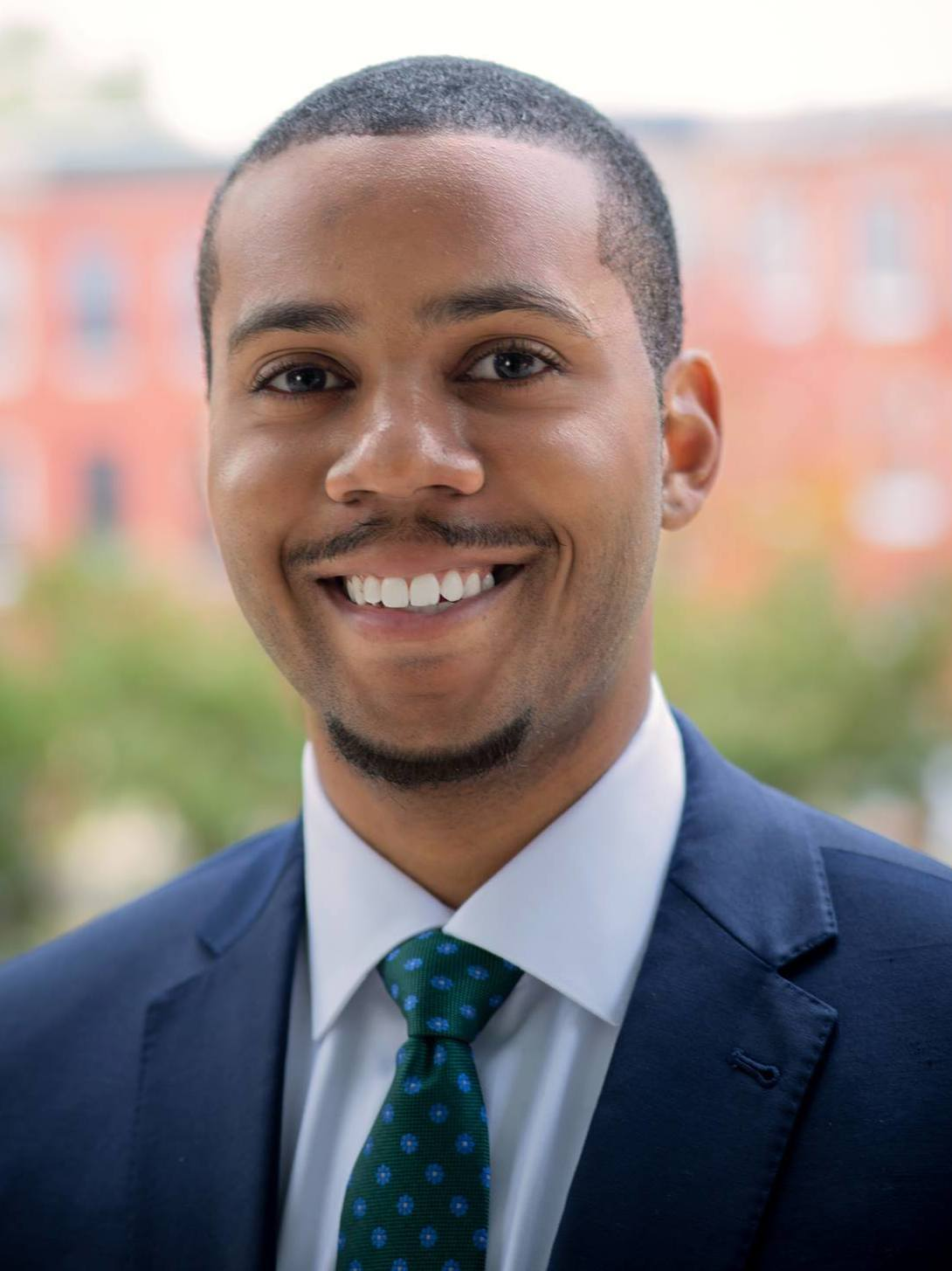
Nominee	Catherine Pugh	Sheila Dixon (write-in)
Party	Democratic	Democratic
Popular vote	134,848	51,716
Percentage	57.61%	22.10%
Nominee	Alan Walden	Joshua Harris
Party	Republican	Green
Popular vote	23,316	23,155
Percentage	9.96%	9.89%
- Precinct results Pugh: 40–50% 50–60% 60–70% Dixon: 40–50% 50–60% No votes
Mayor of Baltimore before election
Stephanie Rawlings-Blake
Democratic
Elected Mayor of Baltimore
Catherine Pugh
Democratic

The 2016 Baltimore mayoral election was held November 8, 2016 concurrent with the General Election. Stephanie Rawlings-Blake, the incumbent mayor, did not run for reelection. Catherine Pugh won the election on November 8, 2016, with 57% of the popular vote, and took office on December 6, 2016.

== Background and candidates ==
Incumbent Mayor Stephanie Rawlings-Blake did not seek re-election in 2016. She completed former Mayor Dixon's term, and won the mayoral seat in the 2011 mayoral race. After holding the office for five years, she faced challenges and criticism during her tenure. Notable events include the 2015 Freddie Gray Protests, Governor Hogan's rejection of the Baltimore Red Line, and an increase in crime since the Freddie Gray Protests in April 2015.

On July 1, 2015, Sheila Dixon entered the 2016 mayoral race. (The terms of Dixon's probation prevented her from running for office until after December 2012.) Since her announcement, Dixon had campaigned in West Baltimore about the city's increasing transportation issues. Additional candidates included Baltimore City Council members Nick Mosby and Carl Stokes, Baltimore Police Sergeant Gersham Cupid, writer Mack Clifton, engineer Calvin Young, Baltimore Sun op-ed contributor Connor Meek, attorney and public servant Elizabeth Embry, and Black Lives Matter activist DeRay Mckesson.

On September 11, 2015, Rawlings-Blake announced that she would not seek re-election as mayor, stating, "It was a very difficult decision, but I knew I needed to spend time focused on the city's future, not my own".

== Democratic primary ==
The Democratic mayoral primary was held on April 26, 2016. Catherine Pugh won the Democratic primary running against former Mayor Sheila Dixon and 11 other challengers in a crowded field to replace Mayor Stephanie Rawlings-Blake.

Declared

- Mack Clifton, writer
- Gersham Cupid, Baltimore police sergeant
- Sheila Dixon, former Mayor of Baltimore
- Elizabeth Embry, attorney and public servant
- Patrick Gutierrez, former bank operations manager
- Mike Maraziti, business owner
- DeRay Mckesson, civil rights activist and former school teacher/administrator
- Connor Meek, Baltimore Sun op-ed contributor
- Nick Mosby, Baltimore City Council member for the 7th district (dropped out)
- Catherine Pugh, State Senator for the 40th district and former Baltimore City Council member for the 4th district
- Carl Stokes, Baltimore City Council member for the 12th district
- Cindy Walsh, former UPS manager and candidate for Governor of Maryland in the 2014 gubernatorial election
- David Warnock, businessman
- Wilton Wilson, nurse
- Calvin Young, engineer

Declined

- Stephanie Rawlings-Blake, incumbent Mayor of Baltimore

Democratic primary results
Party	Candidate	Votes	%
Democratic	Catherine Pugh	48,665	36.6
Democratic	Sheila Dixon	46,219	34.7
Democratic	Elizabeth Embry	15,562	11.7
Democratic	David Warnock	10,835	8.1
Democratic	Carl Stokes	4,620	3.5
Democratic	DeRay Mckesson	3,445	2.6
Democratic	Nick Mosby	1,989	1.5
Democratic	Calvin Young	644	0.5
Democratic	Patrick Guiterrez	398	0.3
Democratic	Cindy Walsh	213	0.2
Democratic	Mack Clifton	204	0.2
Democratic	Gersham Cupid	138	0.1
Democratic	Wilton Wilson	77	0.1
Total votes		133,009	100.00

== Republican primary ==
Declared

- Armand Girard, retired math teacher
- Chancellor Torbit
- Brian Charles Vaeth, perennial candidate
- Alan Walden, retired WBAL radio personality
- Larry Wardlow

Republican primary results
Party	Candidate	Votes	%
Republican	Alan Walden	3,068	41.2
Republican	Larry Wardlow	1,367	18.3
Republican	Brian Vaeth	1,216	16.3
Republican	Armand Girard	940	12.6
Republican	Chancellor Torbit	859	11.5
Total votes		7,450	100.00

== Green Party primary ==
Declared

- Joshua Harris, community activist, co-founder of Hollins Creative Placemaking
- David Marriott, US Marine
- Emanuel McCray, Army Veteran

Green primary results
Party	Candidate	Votes	%
Green	Joshua Harris	---	85
Green	Emanuel McCray	---	7
Green	None Of The Above	---	5
Green	David Marriot	---	3
Total votes		---	100.00

== Write-in candidates ==
Former Mayor of Baltimore Sheila Dixon, who lost in the Democratic primary, re-entered the race as a write-in candidate and came in second to Pugh with 22% of the popular vote. Democratic candidate Mack Clifton, who also lost in the primaries, re-entered as a write-in candidate. In addition, Republican Steven H. Smith, Independent Frank Logan, and unaffiliated candidates Sarah Klauda and Lavern Murray, who did not run in the primaries, joined the race as write-in candidates.

== Results ==
2016 General Election
Party	Candidate	Votes	%
Democratic	Catherine Pugh	134,848	57.61
Write-in	Sheila Dixon	51,716	22.10
Republican	Alan Walden	23,316	9.96
Green	Joshua Harris	23,155	9.89
Write-in	Others	885	0.38
Total votes		234,055	100
