= 2011 Baltimore mayoral election =

- November 8, 2011
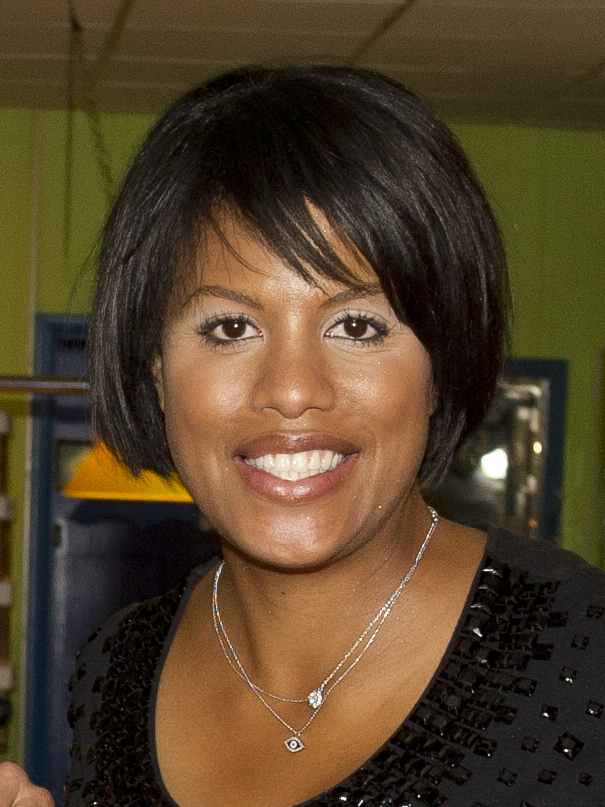

Candidate	Stephanie Rawlings-Blake	Alfred V. Griffin
Party	Democratic	Republican
Popular vote	40,125	6,108
Percentage	84.47%	12.86%
- Precinct results Rawlings-Blake: 50–60% 60–70% 70–80% 80–90% >90% No votes
Mayor before election
Stephanie Rawlings-Blake
Sheila Dixon convicted, 2009
Democratic
Elected Mayor
Stephanie
Rawlings-Blake
Democratic

The 2011 Baltimore mayoral election was held on November 8, 2011. Because Baltimore's electorate is overwhelmingly Democratic, Stephanie Rawlings-Blake's victory in the Democratic primary on September 13, 2011 all but assured her of victory in the general election.

== Background and candidates ==
Sheila Dixon, the winner of the previous mayoral election, was forced from office following a 2010 conviction. Therefore, city council president Stephanie Rawlings-Blake became mayor for the final year of what had been Dixon's term, and subsequently ran for election to a full term. Other candidates for the Democratic nomination included state senator Catherine Pugh; Otis Rolley, a former administrator in city government, Frank M. Conaway Sr., the only person, other than Rawlings-Blake, in the race to have won a citywide election, and former councilman Jody Landers.

=== Other city elections ===
All other Baltimore city officers were also up for election simultaneously with the mayor, including the fourteen members of the Baltimore City Council (elected from single-member districts) and the City Council President and City Comptroller (both elected citywide). Incumbent comptroller Joan Pratt ran unopposed in both the Democratic primary and the general election.

== Democratic primary ==
These are the results for the 2011 Democratic primary, as reported on the City of Baltimore's official website.

Candidate	Votes	%
Stephanie Rawlings-Blake	38,829	52.15%
Catherine E. Pugh	18,797	25.24%
Otis Rolley	9,415	12.64%
Joseph T. Landers	5,089	6.83%
Frank M. Conaway Sr.	2,095	2.81%
Wilton Lloyd Wilson	235	0.32%

== General election campaign ==
=== General election results ===
The General Election was held on November 8, 2011. The results were as follows:

Baltimore City mayoral election, 2011
Party	Candidate	Votes	%
Democratic	Stephanie Rawlings-Blake	40,125	84.47
Republican	Alfred V. Griffin	6,108	12.86
