= Question P =

Referendum in Baltimore, USA

Question P was a Baltimore City referendum issue on the November 5, 2002, general election ballot in which voters overwhelmingly approved reducing the size of the Baltimore City Council from 18 council members to 14 members, each to be elected by a different local district.

== Background ==
Question P was approved by the voters of Baltimore, Maryland, U.S., in November 2002 and took effect in the 2004 election. The ballot initiative proposed "that the City Council consists of 14 members, each to be elected from a different district, and a Council President, to be elected Citywide." Baltimore City had previously had six council districts, each electing three council members. These 18 members, plus one City Council President elected at-large made up the body's 19 seats, cut from 21 to 19 in 1967. Question P amended the City Charter, restructuring the Council into 14 single-member districts, and retained the provision for an at-large Council President to be elected to preside over the body and function as a 15th member in voting.

== In favor of Question P ==
The effort to gather the 10,000 signatures required to put Question P on the ballot was spearheaded by Community and Labor United for Baltimore (CLUB), a grassroots coalition of community groups and labor unions. Members of CLUB included organizations such as the League of Women Voters, AFSCME—a national association for labor unions of public sector employees, and ACORN's Baltimore chapter—a collection of local community organizations that advocate for low-income families and people living in poverty. Two members of the Maryland legislature from Baltimore City, Delegates Jill P. Carter and Curt Anderson, also supported Question P. Both Carter and Anderson did radio commercials that aired on Baltimore radio stations prior to the election.
CLUB's position was that approving Question P would save City taxpayers money by eliminating redundant positions, increase the transparency and accountability of Council members, and make it easier for less-established candidates to get elected.

== Opposition to Question P ==
Council members who opposed Question P attempted to add an alternative measure to the ballot, Question Q, which was worded very similarly and also proposed cutting the number of city council seats from 19 to 14, but retained larger, multi-member districts. According to Baltimore Sun reporter Laura Vozzella, "Critics accused [council members] of trying to sabotage the coalition plan and save their $48,000-a-year part-time jobs, since the two measures [...] likely would have canceled each other out if both passed."

== Outcome ==
In late September 2002, a Court of Appeals judge ruled in favor of CLUB's lawsuit and removed Question Q from the ballot because Shiela Dixon had violated the city's Open Meetings Act (Maryland Rule 15-505) by holding a closed-door committee meeting in August 2002 without giving public notice as required by law. At the private meeting, Council decided to put Question Q on the ballot, which led to Question .

Despite the disapproval of City Council President Sheila Dixon and Mayor Martin O'Malley, Question P passed with more than two thirds (67%) of the vote.
