= Otis Rolley =

American philanthropist and urban planner (born 1974)

Otis Rolley (born 1974) is an American economic development, urban planning, and public sector leader and philanthropist. Since June 2025, he has been the president and chief executive officer of the Baltimore Development Corporation. He previously served as president and CEO of the Newark Community Economic Development Corporation and was director of the Rockefeller Foundation's 100 Resilient Cities for North America. He was a Democratic candidate for mayor of Baltimore in 2011.

== Early years and education ==
Otis Rolley was raised in Jersey City, New Jersey. He earned a B.A. in political science and Africana studies from Rutgers College and a master’s degree in city planning from Massachusetts Institute of Technology.

As a student leader at Rutgers, Rolley was arrested in 1995 for protesting in demand of university president Francis Lawrence’s resignation following racist comments.

== Career ==
Rolley moved to Baltimore, Maryland in 1998. He was appointed to the role of first deputy commissioner of Baltimore Housing at the age of 25. In 2003, Martin O’Malley appointed him as the director of the Baltimore City Department of Planning, and he became the youngest person to hold the position at the age of 29.

In 2006, Rolley served as co-director of the transition committee of Mayor Sheila Dixon and was later appointed as chief of staff. In 2007, Rolley left Dixon’s staff to serve as the founding president and chief executive officer of the Central Maryland Transportation Alliance. In 2010, Rolley was appointed senior manager at Urban Policy Development, a public sector management firm.

In 2014, the mayor of Newark, Ras Baraka, appointed Rolley as chief executive officer of Brick City Development Corporation (later renamed Newark Community Economic Development Corporation), and later named him substantive president and CEO.

Rolley served the Rockefeller Foundation’s 100 Resilient Cities initiative as its North American managing director, providing technical assistance to member cities across the United States and Canada to mitigate environmental and socioeconomic challenges. He also served the Foundation as a senior vice president, coordinating its U.S. Equity and Economic Opportunity Initiatives.

In 2022, Wells Fargo appointed Rolley as Head of Social Impact to lead the Wells Fargo Foundation and coordinate community engagement and enterprise philanthropy. He was the first African American to lead the Wells Fargo Foundation.

Rolley was appointed president and chief executive officer of Baltimore Development Corporation in June 2025. He is the first African American man to hold the position.

== Civic engagement ==
Rolley is chair of the Baltimore Hotel Corporation and serves on boards of organizations such as Visit Baltimore, Downtown Partnership of Baltimore, and the Stonewall Community Foundation. He is also an advisory board member for Black Girls Vote, and a member of the Board of Governors for the Joint Center for Political and Economic Studies. His philanthropic work has also included positions with the Asset Funders Network and the executive committee of The Families and Workers Fund.

In 2011, Rolley ran for mayor of Baltimore and finished third in the Democratic primary.

== Family ==
Rolley has three children and lives in Baltimore with his partner.
