= Carl Stokes (Maryland politician) =

American politician (born 1950)

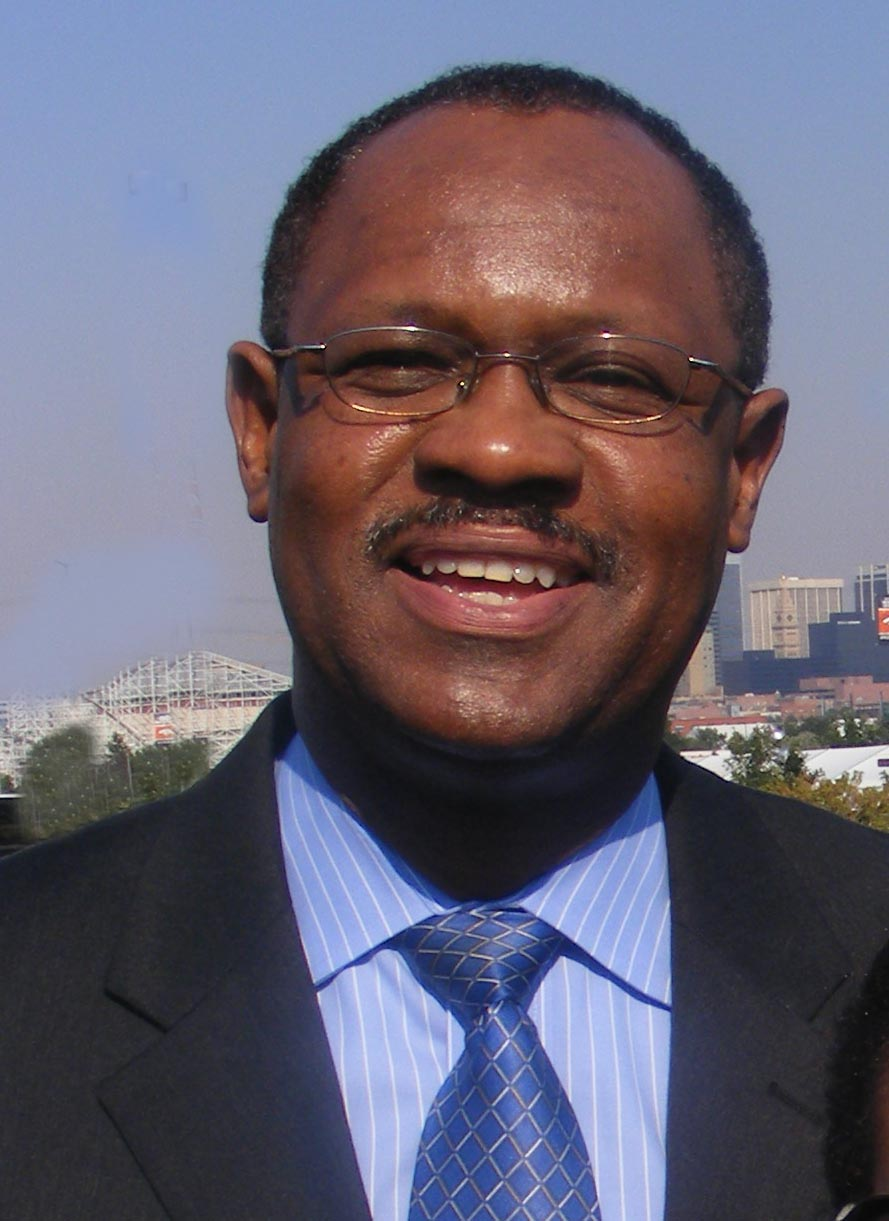

Member of the Baltimore City Council from the 12th District
- In office March 2010 – January 2016
- Preceded by: Jack Young
- Succeeded by: Robert Stokes

Member of the Baltimore City Council from the 2nd District
- In office 1987–1995 Serving with Tony Ambridge, Jacqueline McClean
- Constituency: East Baltimore

Personal details
- Born: Carl Frank Stokes; April 30, 1950 (age 76)
- Party: Democratic
- Spouse: Divorced
- Children: 2
- Occupation: Education administrator

Carl Frank Stokes is an American politician who represented the 12th district on the Baltimore City Council. He is a former member of the Baltimore City Board of school commissioners and ran for Mayor of Baltimore in 1999.

== Background ==
Stokes was born on April 30, 1950, in Baltimore, Maryland. He grew up in Baltimore's Latrobe housing project and attended parochial schools. He graduated from the Loyola Blakefield high school in 1968 and attended Loyola College. He managed and then owned a retail clothing store before being elected to represent the then-second district on the Baltimore City Council in 1987. Stokes left the council in 1995 and in the same year accepted an appointment by the Governor of Maryland and the Mayor of Baltimore to serve on the newly reconstituted Baltimore City Board of School Commissioners. Stokes is a former vice president of Mid-Atlantic Health Care, a medical equipment and supplies company and was the Chief Operating Officer (COO) of The Bluford Drew Jemison STEM Academy, a public charter middle school for boys founded in 2006 and opened in 2007 in East Baltimore.

== Mayoral bids ==
=== 1999 ===
Stokes was one of 15 candidates vying for mayor in the Democratic primary election for Mayor of Baltimore in the 1999 election. A Republican had not won the mayoralty since Theodore McKeldin's second tour as Mayor (1963–1967). Thus the focus in Baltimore was on the Democratic primary. Of the 15, three were considered coequal front runners: Stokes, City Council president Lawrence Bell and then Councilman Martin O'Malley. At one point Stokes enjoyed a slight lead in the polls, but O'Malley, the only white candidate of the three front runners, emerged triumphant. O'Malley garnered 62,711 votes, Stokes finished second with 32,609 votes and Bell placed third with 20,034 votes.

=== 2016 ===
In September 2015, Stokes announced that he would seek the 2016 Democratic nomination for Mayor of Baltimore City. He finished a distant fifth behind state Sen. Catherine Pugh, who would go on to win the general election.

== On the council ==
Stokes was vice chair of the Education and Executive Appointments committees and was a member of the Taxation, Finance and Economic Development, the Public Safety and Health and the Policy and Planning committees.
