= Walter Orlinsky =

American politician

- Born: May 19, 1938; Baltimore, Maryland
- Died: February 9, 2002 (aged 63); Baltimore, Maryland
- Occupation: Politician
- Years active: 1966–2000
- Known for: President, Baltimore City Council, 1971–1982; resigned in extortion scandal

Walter "Wally" S. Orlinsky (May 19, 1938 – February 9, 2002) was an American politician who served in public office in the city of Baltimore and the state of Maryland. A Democrat, he was the president of the Baltimore City Council from 1971 to 1982, when he resigned after being charged with extortion. Before being elected the City Council President, he served as a delegate to the Maryland House of Delegates from 1967 to 1968. Orlinsky was an unsuccessful candidate for Governor of Maryland in 1978.

While president of the city council, Orlinsky developed a scheme to create a Guinness Book of World Records-sized cake in the shape of the United States, and to sell 153,000 pieces of cake to pay for Baltimore's Bicentennial party. When only 30,000 people showed up for the Fourth of July event (half of the projected numbers), 17 tons of cake were discarded, including 3000 pounds of icing which washed into the harbor due to a thunderstorm.

After accepting a cash bribe in 1982 from a hauler which sought a city contract to transport sludge to Western Maryland, Orlinsky pled guilty to one charge of extortion. He was sentenced to 6 months in prison, of which he served 4 1/2 months in the Allenwood Federal Prison. Orlinsky received a pardon from President Bill Clinton in 2000. After his release from prison, Orlinsky worked as a restaurant maître d', a vendor at Oriole Park at Camden Yards, and executive director of a tree-planting program of the Maryland Forest Service. He died of cancer in 2002.

The son of Harry Orlinsky and Donya (née Fein) Orlinsky, Walter was born in Baltimore in 1938. He attended Johns Hopkins University, where he participated with a group of student activists who unsuccessfully sought to integrate the nearby Blue Jay Restaurant by bringing Duke Ellington there after a concert on February 22, 1960. Orlinsky attended University of Maryland Law School, and was admitted to practice law in Maryland in 1965.

Orlinsky was Jewish.
