= Catherine Pugh =

American politician (born 1950)

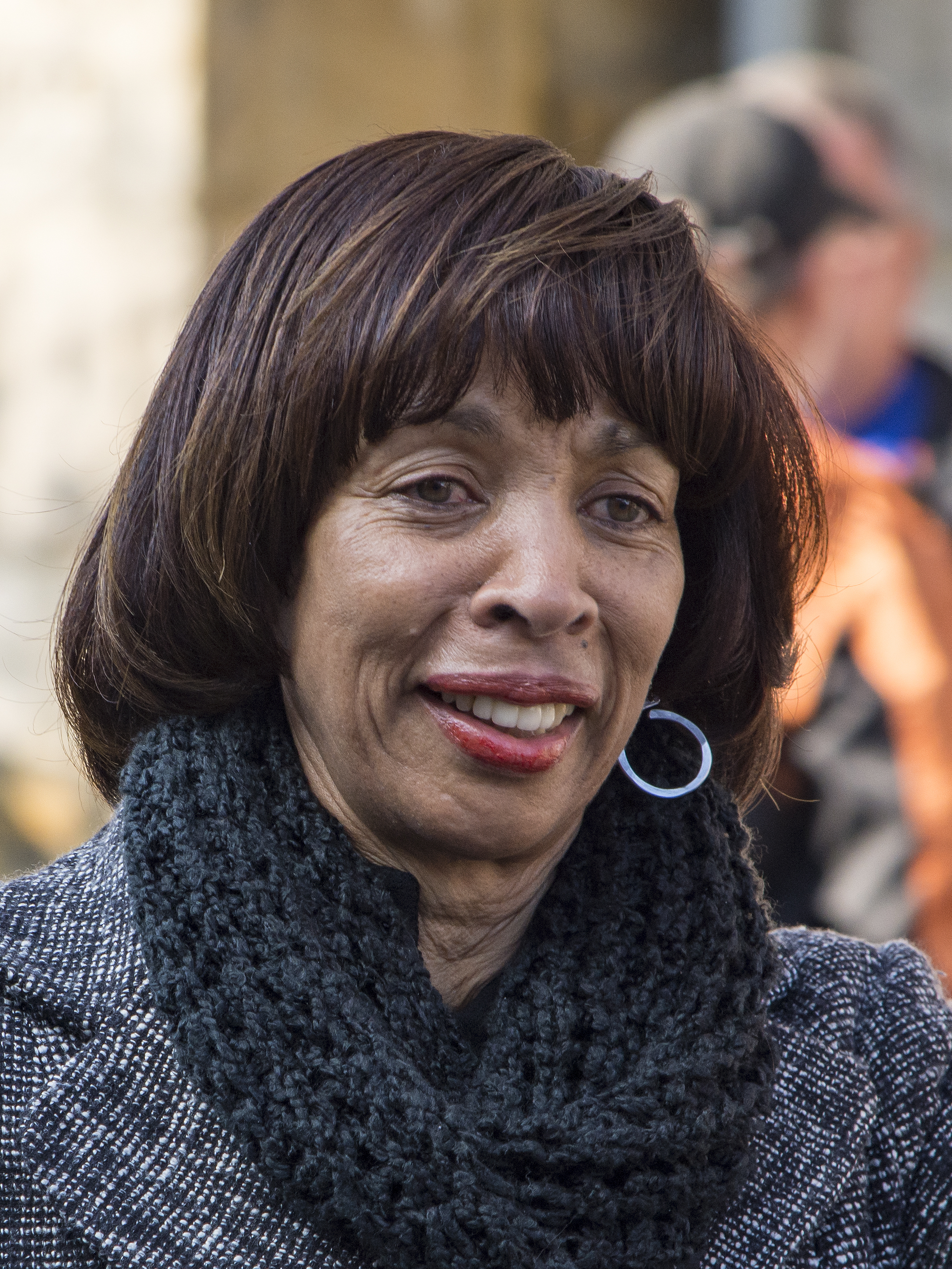
- Pugh in 2017

51st Mayor of Baltimore
- In office December 6, 2016 – May 2, 2019; On leave: April 2, 2019 – May 2, 2019
- Preceded by: Stephanie Rawlings-Blake
- Succeeded by: Jack Young

Majority Leader of the Maryland Senate
- In office January 14, 2015 – December 6, 2016
- Preceded by: James Robey
- Succeeded by: Douglas J. J. Peters

Member of the Maryland Senate from the 40th district
- In office January 10, 2007 – December 6, 2016
- Preceded by: Ralph M. Hughes
- Succeeded by: Barbara A. Robinson

Member of the Maryland House of Delegates from the 40th district
- In office June 16, 2005 – January 10, 2007
- Preceded by: Tony Fulton
- Succeeded by: Shawn Z. Tarrant

Member of the Baltimore City Council from the 4th district
- In office January 2000 – December 7, 2004
- Preceded by: Sheila Dixon
- Succeeded by: Jack Young

Personal details
- Born: Catherine Elizabeth Crump; March 10, 1950 (age 76) Norristown, Pennsylvania, U.S.
- Party: Democratic
- Spouse: Phillip Pugh (m. 1973; div. 1975)
- Education: Morgan State University (BS, MBA)
- Pugh's voice Pugh addresses members of the U.S. Coast Guard Chapter of Blacks In Government. Recorded August 25, 2009

Catherine Elizabeth Pugh (born March 10, 1950) is an American former politician who served as the 51st mayor of Baltimore, Maryland's largest city, from 2016 to 2019. She resigned from office amid a scandal that eventually led to criminal charges, three years in prison, and three years probation in 2020.

Pugh entered in Maryland politics in 1999, when she was elected to the Baltimore City Council. She subsequently held office in the Maryland House of Delegates and the Maryland Senate, serving as the Majority Leader from 2015 to 2016. Pugh ran for mayor of Baltimore in 2016 and won the primary against former mayor Sheila Dixon. Pugh then won the mayoral election on November 8, 2016, with 57% of the popular vote, and took office on December 6, 2016.

In 2019, Pugh was accused of involvement in a scandal over a "self-dealing" arrangement in which organizations purchased large quantities of Pugh's books in exchange for contracts with the city. On May 2, 2019, Pugh resigned as mayor amid the book scandal and on November 20, 2019, she was indicted by a grand jury on eleven counts, including tax evasion, fraud and conspiracy in connection with the book transactions. The following day she signed a plea agreement, pleading guilty to four charges of conspiracy and tax evasion. Pugh served two years in federal prison before being released on probation into a Baltimore halfway house.

== Early life and education ==
Catherine Pugh was born as Catherine Crump on March 10, 1950, in Norristown, Pennsylvania, the second of seven children born to James and Addie Crump. She was raised in Philadelphia with her seven siblings and graduated from Overbrook High School in 1967.

=== Morgan State University ===
Pugh attended Morgan State University in Baltimore, Maryland, graduating in 1973 with a Bachelor of Science. In 1977, she earned Master of Business Administration from Morgan State University. She is a member of the Delta Sigma Theta sorority.

== Early career ==
After graduation from Morgan State, Pugh began working as a branch manager for Equitable Trust Bank. Pugh got her start in government in 1975 when she joined the administration of Mayor William Donald Schaefer as the director of the Citizen's Involvement Program. In 1977, Pugh began teaching Marketing and Introduction to Business at Morgan State University. In 1988, Pugh founded a public relations firm, Pugh and Company. From the mid-1980s to the early 1990s, she was an independent editor for The Baltimore Sun and dean and director of Strayer Business College in Baltimore.

In 1994, she returned to Philadelphia and became vice president of Brunson Communications and co-owner of a local Delaware Valley TV station, WGTW-TV, where she was the host of "Another View", a weekly public affairs program that focused on policy issues within the black community and featured interviews with community leaders and public officials.

== Political career ==
=== Baltimore City Council ===
In 1999 Pugh was elected to the Baltimore City Council, where she served until 2004. She ran for president of the council in 2003 and finished the Democratic primary with 30% of the vote, but lost to Sheila Dixon who earned 54%.

During her tenure on city council, Pugh created a public art project in which fish sculptures were placed around the city, and helped to found the Baltimore Marathon.

=== Maryland General Assembly ===
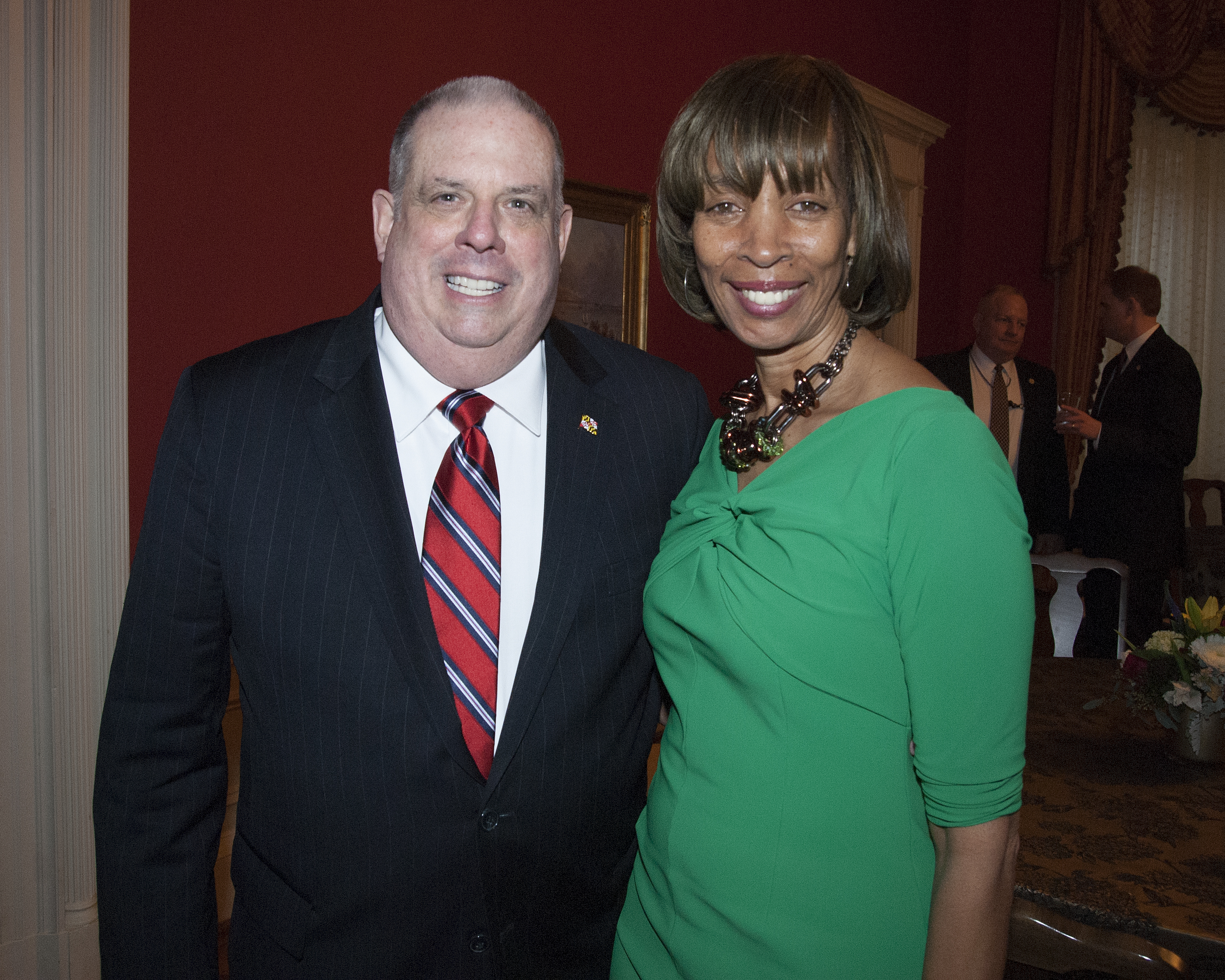
Pugh with Governor Hogan at the 2016 State of the State Reception

In 2005, Governor Bob Ehrlich appointed Pugh to an open seat in the Maryland House of Delegates for the 40th district, where she served from June 21, 2005, to January 10, 2007. She then won a seat in the State Senate for the same district and served there from January 10, 2007, to December 6, 2016. She ran unopposed in the 2010 and 2014 Senate elections. While serving, she sat on the Finance Committee and served as the State Senate Majority Leader. Pugh was the president of the National Black Caucus of State Legislators from 2015 to 2016. She was also chair of the Legislative Black Caucus of Maryland and the Women's Caucus of Legislators in Maryland from 2005 to 2007.

As Majority Leader, Pugh led the state on cyber security and telemedicine expansion legislation. Pugh is also responsible for diversifying the state's $40 billion pension portfolio, having led the passage of Senate Bill 606, which increased black and other minority managed dollars from $300 million to $4.2 billion. She also passed legislation allowing Baltimore City to offer $2,500 in property tax relief to public safety officers who work and own a home in Baltimore City.

In 2011 while still serving as senator for district 40, Pugh and Maryland Institute of College of Art (MICA) President Fred Lazarus founded the Baltimore Design School, the first design school in Maryland to serve middle and high school students. Pugh first ran for mayor in 2011 but lost the primary to Stephanie Rawlings-Blake after only receiving 25% of the votes.

=== 2016 Baltimore mayoral campaign ===
In 2015, Pugh entered the race for mayor of Baltimore and launched her campaign headquarters in the city. Initially she was an underdog to former mayor Sheila Dixon. The endorsement of Congressman Elijah Cummings in April 2016 significantly boosted her campaigning efforts. Pugh won the Democratic primary, with 37% of the vote to Dixon's 34%. The Democratic primary has long been the real contest in Baltimore, where Democrats outnumber Republicans 10-to-1, so Pugh was overwhelmingly favored in the general election. She won the November 8 general election with 57% of the vote, and resigned as state senator before taking office on December 6, 2016.

=== Mayor of Baltimore ===
Pugh succeeded Stephanie Rawlings-Blake as Baltimore's 51st mayor. As mayor, she inherited several issues from the Rawlings-Blake administration. Pugh prioritized the United States Department of Justice investigation into the Baltimore Police Department following the death of Freddie Gray, before the 2017 inauguration of Donald Trump. In April 2017, Judge James K. Bredar approved the consent decree signed by Pugh and former acting U.S. Assistant Attorney General Vanita Gupta, rejecting an objection by new U.S. Attorney General Jeff Sessions.

Additional issues the Pugh administration faced included Baltimore's crime levels, vacant housing and revitalization development, and the cancellation of the Baltimore Red Line and launch of Governor Larry Hogan's BaltimoreLink bus system overhaul. Despite supporting it during her campaign, Pugh vetoed a bill to increase Baltimore's minimum wage to $15 per hour over five years, citing concerns about businesses moving out of the city and adverse effects on nonprofits and small businesses. Ricarra Jones, chairwoman of the Fight for $15 Baltimore Coalition, responded to the veto, "As a state senator, Mayor Pugh was a strong supporter of a livable minimum wage and explicitly promised to sign the Baltimore wage bill as mayor. Today, she has made clear that promises are made to be broken."

In July 2017, Pugh along with other city leaders announced a mandatory one-year sentence for illegal possession of a gun in many parts of Baltimore. The move was seen as an attempt to address the city's soaring violence rate. The Baltimore city council voted to amend the legislation to only apply if it was a person's second offense or if the gun was connected to an already committed crime.

During her tenure as mayor, Pugh pursued several policies in trying to reduce opioid deaths in the city. In February 2018, Pugh issued a standing order that allowed any Baltimore resident to get naloxone, the antidote that reverses an opioid overdose, without a prescription and in March, Pugh helped establish the Baltimore City Stabilization Center, the first 24/7 urgent care facility dedicated to issues of addiction and opioid use in Baltimore City.

In August 2018, Pugh ordered the removal of the Stonewall Jackson and Robert E. Lee Monument in Wyman Park as she believed it posed a "risk to public safety". In May 2018, Pugh established a $55 million fund to boost investment in struggling city neighborhoods, financed by leasing city-owned garages called the Neighborhood Impact Investment Fund.

=== Healthy Holly scandal ===
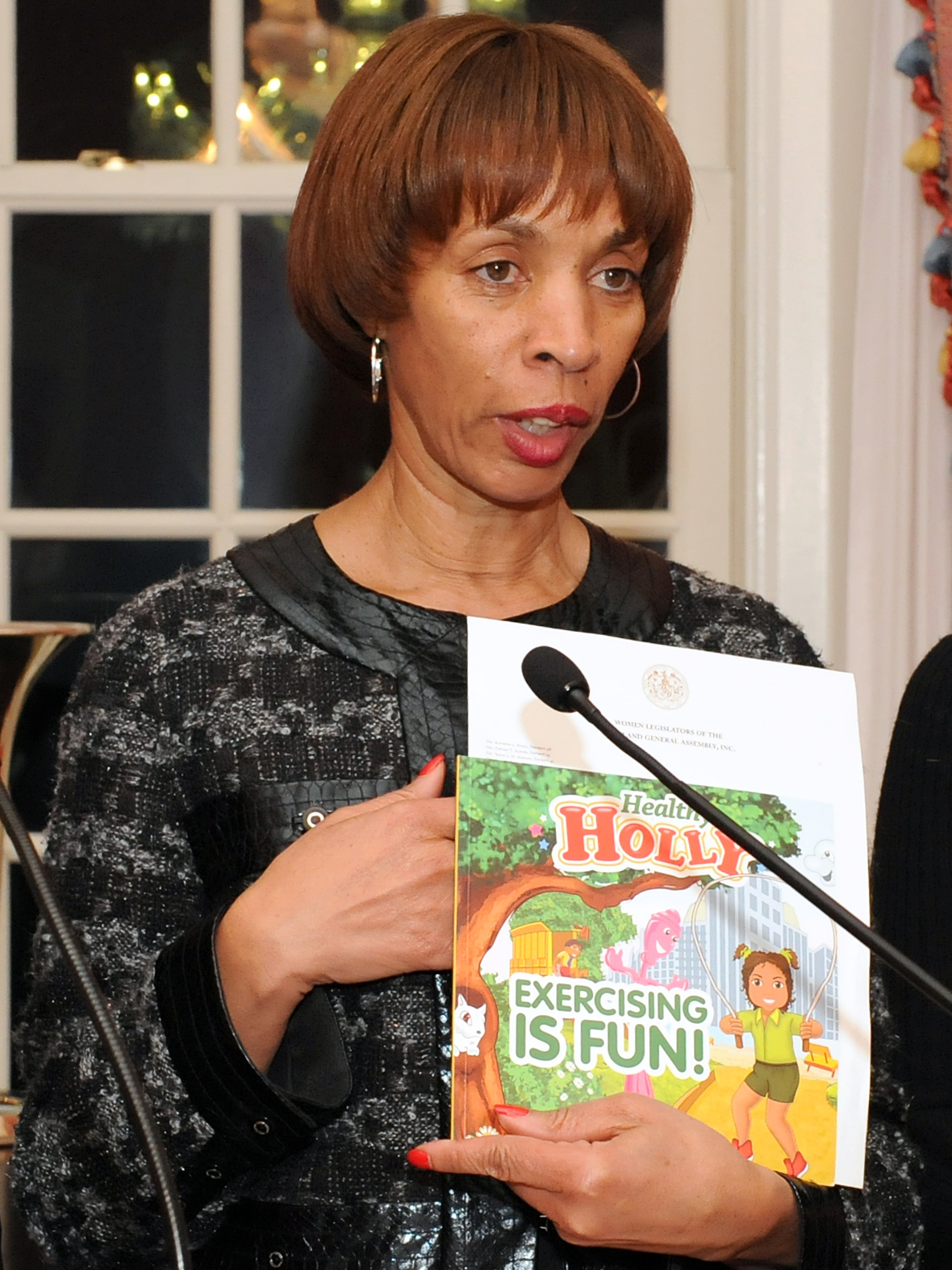
Catherine Pugh holds a Healthy Holly book.

In 2019, Pugh was involved in a scheme in which several organizations purchased large quantities of her children's books in exchange for contracts with the city. In March 2019, Pugh agreed to accept $500,000 from the University of Maryland Medical System while serving as a trustee to purchase her Healthy Holly self-published books to donate to Baltimore schoolchildren. This no-bid payment was controversial because the years of payments coincided with her tenure as head of a health committee in the Maryland State Senate and as mayor of Baltimore. She did not disclose the payments or recuse herself from votes and decisions involving the medical system. Maryland legislative leaders pledged to reform the medical center's practice of giving large contracts to trustees due to the conflict it poses to their decision-making, which includes approving a $4 million salary to the institution's CEO. Pugh received $500,000 from the University of Maryland Medical System (UMMS) for 100,000 copies of her books. However, the firm printing the publication confirmed it had printed only 60,000 copies.

Pugh initially said that the payments from the University of Maryland Medical System were her only book sales, but on April 1, 2019, the Baltimore Sun reported that Kaiser Permanente paid more than $100,000 for copies of the book, and a nonprofit called Associated Black Charities paid Pugh's organization nearly $80,000 for copies of the book. Both organizations do business with the city of Baltimore. Associated Black Charities in turn resold some of its copies to other organizations, including CareFirst BlueCross BlueShield, another Baltimore insurer.

=== Resignation and criminal charges ===
In April 2019 amid the ongoing scandal, Pugh announced she was taking an indefinite leave of absence to recover from pneumonia. On April 8, 2019, all members of the Baltimore City Council signed a memorandum calling for Pugh to resign as mayor. Pugh maintained that she intended to return to office following her leave of absence. On April 25, 2019, while Pugh was still on her leave of absence, FBI and IRS agents raided six locations, including two houses owned by Pugh, Baltimore City Hall, and a nonprofit organization on whose board Pugh served.

On May 2, 2019, Pugh resigned as Mayor of Baltimore. On November 20, 2019, she was indicted by a grand jury on 11 counts of fraud, tax evasion, and conspiracy in connection with the Healthy Holly book transactions. The following day she signed a plea agreement, admitting guilt on four counts of tax evasion and conspiracy.

==== Sentencing ====
On February 27, 2020, Pugh was sentenced to three years in prison to be followed by three years of probation. U.S. District Judge Deborah K. Chasanow ordered Pugh to pay $412,000 in restitution. Additionally, Pugh will forfeit nearly $670,000, including her Ashburton home and the remaining balance of her campaign account totaling $17,800. Pugh has also agreed that all copies of Healthy Holly in government custody will be destroyed. She was granted several extensions to delay the start of her prison sentence. On June 26, 2020, Pugh reported to prison at Federal Correctional Institution, Aliceville, Alabama. Pugh was released from prison around the beginning of January 2022 and transferred to a Baltimore halfway house.

== Personal life ==
Pugh married her husband Phillip in 1973, and they divorced two years later; she has no children. She lives in Baltimore's Ashburton neighborhood in the Forest Park area of Northwest Baltimore City.

A runner and fitness enthusiast, Pugh has written a series of children's health books called Mind Garden: Where Thoughts Grow and Healthy Holly, which advocate exercise and healthy eating. She is also the founder of several Baltimore community programs, such as the Fish Out of Water Project, an initiative that promotes tourism in Baltimore City to raise money for arts programs for local youth and the Need to Read Campaign, a program designed to help Baltimore residents improve their reading skills.

== See also ==
- List of mayors of Baltimore

Maryland Senate
Preceded by James Robey	Majority Leader of the Maryland Senate; 2015–2016	Succeeded by Douglas J. J. Peters
Political offices
Preceded by Stephanie Rawlings-Blake	Mayor of Baltimore; 2016–2019	Succeeded by Bernard C. Young
