= Sheila Dixon =

American mayor

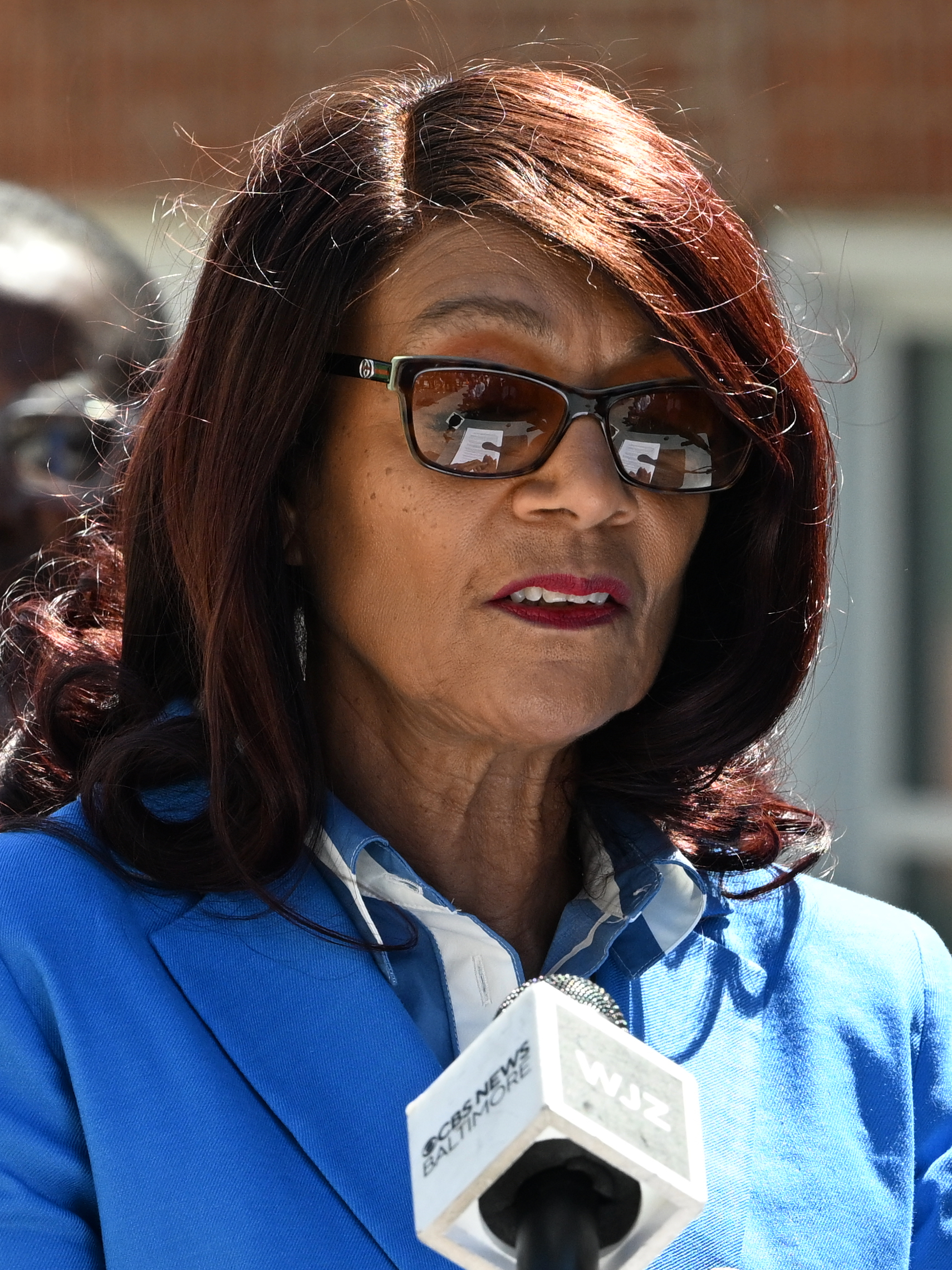
- Dixon in 2026

49th Mayor of Baltimore
- In office January 17, 2007 – February 4, 2010
- Preceded by: Martin O'Malley
- Succeeded by: Stephanie Rawlings-Blake

President of the Baltimore City Council
- In office December 1999 – January 2007
- Preceded by: Lawrence Bell
- Succeeded by: Stephanie Rawlings-Blake

Member of the Baltimore City Council from the 4th District
- In office December 1987 – December 1999
- Preceded by: Kweisi Mfume; Michael Mitchell
- Succeeded by: Catherine Pugh

Personal details
- Born: Sheila Ann Dixon; December 27, 1953 (age 72) Baltimore, Maryland, U.S.
- Party: Democratic
- Children: 2
- Relatives: Juan Dixon (nephew)
- Education: Towson University (BA); Johns Hopkins University (MA)

Sheila Ann Dixon (born December 27, 1953) is an American politician who served as the 49th mayor of Baltimore, Maryland, after mayor Martin O'Malley was sworn in as governor on January 17, 2007. Dixon, then president of the Baltimore City Council, served out the remaining year of her term and won the mayoral election in November 2007. Dixon was the first African-American woman to serve as president of the City Council, Baltimore's first female mayor, and Baltimore's third black mayor.

On January 9, 2009, Dixon was indicted by a grand jury on twelve felony and misdemeanor counts, including perjury, theft, and misconduct. The indictment alleged the personal use of gift cards, donated by two prominent Baltimore real estate developers, Patrick Turner and Ronald Lipscomb. In December 2009, the trial jury delivered a guilty verdict on one count of "fraudulent misappropriation by a fiduciary" and acquitted her on two counts of felony theft, and one count of misconduct in office. As part of a plea agreement made in December 2009, Dixon received probation in exchange for stepping down as mayor. She was succeeded by then City Council president, Stephanie Rawlings-Blake.

Dixon has remained active in the Baltimore community and sought reelection for mayor in 2016. She was defeated in the Democratic Primary by then State Senator Catherine Pugh, who received 2,408 more votes than Dixon. Dixon challenged Pugh as a write-in candidate in the general election, but lost with 51,716 votes. In the 2020 Baltimore mayoral election, she again sought the Democratic nomination, but narrowly lost to candidate Brandon Scott. On September 7, 2023, she announced a third election bid to return to the mayoralty in 2024, but was once again defeated by Mayor Scott in the 2024 Democratic primary.

== Early life and education ==
Dixon was born and was raised in the Ashburton neighborhood of West Baltimore. Her father, Phillip Dixon Sr., was a car salesman, and her mother, Winona Dixon, was a community activist.

Dixon attended the Baltimore City public schools and graduated from Northwestern High School. She earned a bachelor's degree from Towson University and a master's degree from Johns Hopkins University.

== Career ==
=== Education and government ===
After graduating from college, Dixon worked as an elementary school teacher and adult education instructor with the Head Start program. She then worked for 17 years as an international trade specialist with the Maryland Department of Business and Economic Development.

In 1986, Dixon was elected to the Baltimore City Democratic State Central Committee representing the 40th Legislative District. In 1987, she won a seat on the Baltimore City Council representing the 4th Council District, where she served twelve years.

=== Shoe comment ===
In 1991, Dixon waved her shoe at white colleagues on the Baltimore City Council and yelled, "You've been running things for the last 20 years. Now the shoe is on the other foot." This incident led many people, including some of her supporters, to view her as a divisive person.

Dixon explained her earlier comment by stating that she had "matured" since making the shoe comment and that she now attempts "to communicate better with individuals".

=== City Council presidency ===
In 1999, Dixon was elected president of the Baltimore City Council, the first African-American woman elected to this position. In 2003, she won her re-election race for president of the Baltimore City Council, defeating her nearest competitor, Catherine Pugh, by 21,000 votes.

=== Mayor of Baltimore ===
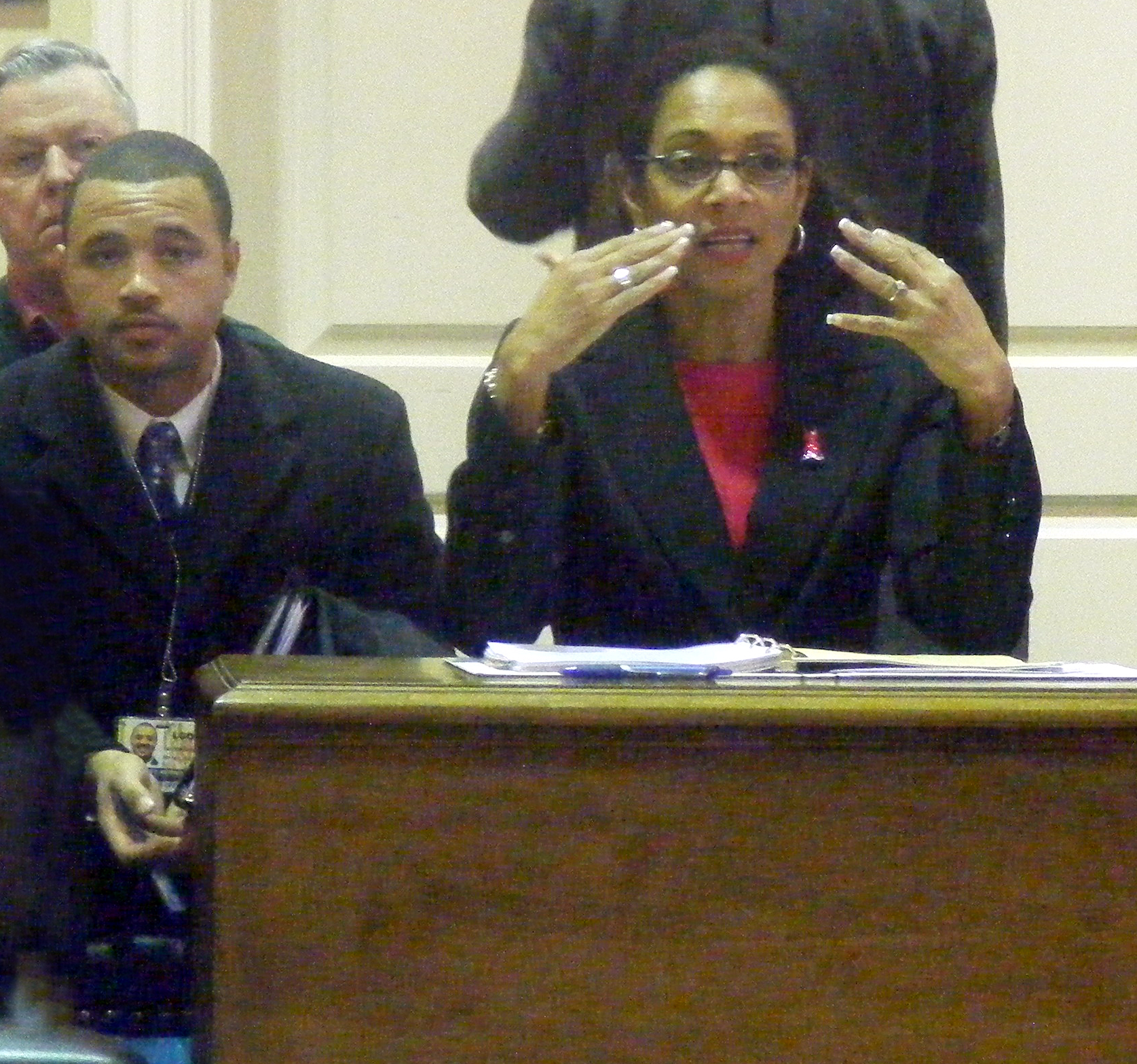
Mayor Sheila Dixon addressing Baltimore's state delegation on two Baltimore City gun related bills.

As City Council President, Dixon was ex officio mayor pro tempore, and ascended as mayor when Martin O'Malley resigned after being elected governor of Maryland in November 2006.

During her tenure, Baltimore's homicide rate dropped for the first time in the 30 years. In 2007, Dixon introduced a crime plan that focused on more community policing and using police resources to target the most violent offenders. To combat crime, Dixon appointed Police Commissioner Frederick H. Bealefeld III, who supported her neighborhood-crime strategy. In February 2008, the Baltimore City Police reported a sharp decline in homicides in Baltimore. According to police there were 14 murders in the city for the month of January, the lowest monthly total in 30 years. As of April 2008, there had been a 40% reduction in murders in the city after experiencing a record high in 2007 during Dixon's first year in office. By April 15, 2008, the number of murders in the city had grown to 54, the lowest total to this time of the year in recent memory, putting the city on pace for 189 murders in 2008. By the end of 2008, the murder count was 234—a 17% reduction over the previous year.

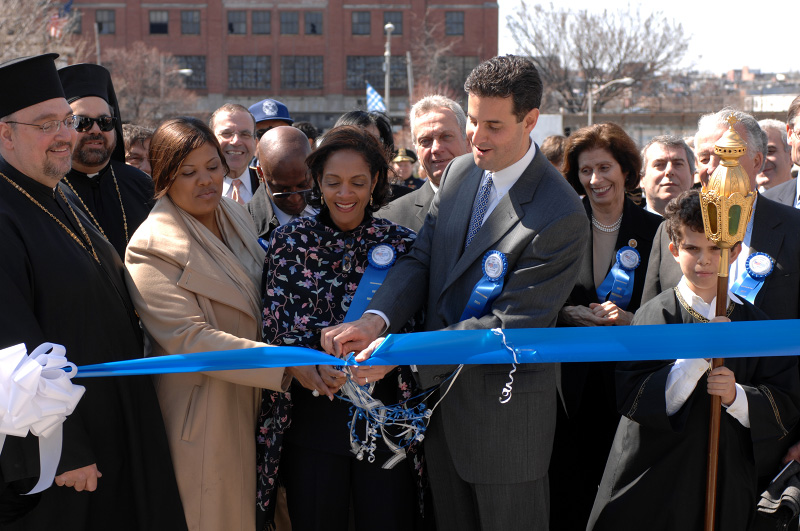
Dixon (front, third from left) cuts the parade ribbon at the 2007 Baltimore Greek Independence Day Parade with Congressman John Sarbanes.

While her critics complained that crime had risen in Baltimore during her tenure and that she did not pay enough attention to the issue, her record shows that she had increased police patrols, cracked down on the possession of illegal guns, and actively secured federal and state funds for crime-fighting programs.

Several city developments were completed during Dixon's tenure such as Baltimore's Inner Harbor East community, the Legg Mason Tower, and the Baltimore Hilton Hotel.

As mayor, Dixon was a member of the Mayors Against Illegal Guns Coalition.

=== 2007 mayoral election ===
Dixon ran for a full term as mayor in the 2007 election and won the Democratic Party primary in September. Dixon maintained a strong fundraising advantage throughout the campaign. Scores of public officials, unions and newspapers endorsed the mayor’s campaign. This includes The Baltimore Sun, The Baltimore Afro-American, the AFL-CIO, former Rep. Kweisi Mfume, Minority Contractors Association, SEIU, SEIU United Healthcare Workers East, Gov. O'Malley, Comptroller Peter Franchot, Unite Here, United Auto Workers, and others.

A major issue during the primary mayoral campaign was crime. By mid-2007, homicides in Baltimore were on pace to surpass 300 for the year, the most since the early years of the O'Malley administration. On June 19, Dixon presented her crime plan to 500 Baltimore police officers, but Dixon was attacked by Mitchell and Carter for not doing enough. Dixon's crime plan departed from that of previous Mayor Martin O'Malley in that it stressed community policing and focused on apprehending the most violent offenders as opposed to zero-tolerance approach. As of June 19, 2007, there were 146 homicides and 340 non-lethal shootings in the city.

By the end of July 2007, Dixon's campaign had been endorsed by the Baltimore Metropolitan Council of the Maryland AFL-CIO collectively as well as several individual union endorsements. Maryland Comptroller Peter Franchot was the only statewide elected official to endorse Dixon until an August 13 rally in which Governor Martin O'Malley gave his endorsement. Former Congressman Kweisi Mfume also endorsed Dixon at the same event in front of Baltimore's City Hall. State Delegates Tom Hucker, Maggie McIntosh, Curt Anderson, Cheryl Glenn, Melvin L. Stukes, Talmadge Branch, Senators Nathaniel J. McFadden and Catherine Pugh and Baltimore City Council members Robert Curran, Bernard "Jack" Young, Ed Reisinger, Stephanie Rawlings Blake and Agnes Welch endorsed Dixon and were at the rally as well.

==== Results ====
Dixon won the 2007 Baltimore Democratic Mayoral Primary over her closest opponent, Keiffer Mitchell Jr., with 63 percent of the total votes, virtually assuring her of a full term in the overwhelmingly Democratic city. Dixon then defeated Republican Elbert Henderson in the November general election, becoming the first woman elected as mayor of Baltimore.

The Democratic primary results were:

Candidate	Votes	%
Sheila Dixon	54,381	63.1%
Keiffer Mitchell Jr.	20,376	23.7%
Andrey Bundley	6,543	7.6%
Jill P. Carter	2,372	2.8%
A. Robert Kaufman	885	1.0%
Mike Schaefer	762	0.9%
Frank Conaway	533	0.6%
Phillip Brown	273	0.3%

General election:

Candidate	Votes	%
Sheila Dixon	36,726	87.7%
Elbert Henderson	5,139	12.3%

In her first inaugural address as Mayor, Dixon alluded to what she considered people's wrong impression of her and stated, "I want you to know that I am much more than a newspaper headline or a sound bite on the evening news."

=== Prosecution ===
In 2008, investigators from the Office of the State Prosecutor executed a search warrant at Dixon's residence in southwest Baltimore. Around the same time, several subpoenas were issued to Dixon's aides. The investigation examined gifts, including several fur coats, as well as Dixon's spending habits. Two of Dixon's associates—campaign chair Dale Clark and Mildred Boyer, a businesswoman who had hired Dixon's sister—pleaded guilty in 2008 to tax charges and cooperated with prosecutors during their investigation into Dixon. The affidavit filed to support a search warrant on the company Doracon was published by The Baltimore Sun in June 2008; the affidavit stated that Dixon was being investigated for bribery.

On January 9, 2009, Dixon was indicted by a Baltimore grand jury on twelve counts: four counts of perjury, two counts of misconduct, three counts of theft, and three counts of fraudulent misappropriations.

==== Fraud trial ====
In November 2009, Dixon was tried for three counts of felony theft, three counts of misdemeanor embezzlement/misappropriation, and a single count of misconduct of office. The trial began on November 10, 2009, with Arnold M. Weiner serving as lead counsel. During the trial, two counts (one theft charge and one embezzlement/misappropriation charge) were dropped when prosecutors declined to call a key witness. On December 1, 2009, after seven days of deliberations, the jury returned verdicts on four of the five remaining counts. Dixon was found not guilty of the two felony-theft charges, as well as not guilty of the one count of misconduct of office.

She was found guilty on one misdemeanor embezzlement charge relating to her use of over $600 worth of retail-store gift cards that were intended to be distributed to needy families. The jury was unable to reach a unanimous decision regarding the final charge of misdemeanor embezzlement.

==== Resignation and probation ====
On January 6, 2010, as part of a plea agreement reached with prosecutors, Dixon announced that she was resigning as mayor, effective February 4, 2010. Under the terms of the agreement, Dixon received probation before judgment (PBJ) in the recent case in which she had been found guilty, as well as in a perjury trial that had been scheduled for March 2010. Under the Criminal Procedure Article, sec. 6–220 of the Annotated Code of Maryland, a PBJ is not a conviction, thereby enabling her to keep her $83,000 pension. Also, under Maryland law, a PBJ may be expunged from one's record once the probationary period is over.

Dixon was sentenced to four years of probation under the terms of the agreement. She also was required to donate $45,000 to the Bea Gaddy Foundation and to serve 500 hours of community service at Our Daily Bread. In addition, she agreed to sell gifts she received from developers, including a fur coat and electronics that she purchased with gift cards. Dixon agreed to not seek office anywhere in the state of Maryland, including Baltimore, during her probationary term and that she will not solicit or accept taxpayer money to pay her defense fees.

=== 2016 Mayoral election ===
In 2015, Dixon made a second attempt at becoming mayor of Baltimore. She was the front-runner in the Democratic primary until early 2016, when Congressman Elijah Cummings endorsed her leading opponent, Catherine Pugh in April 2016. Pugh won the Democratic primary with 37% of the vote, while Dixon received 35% of the vote.

Democratic primary results
Party	Candidate	Votes	%
Democratic	Catherine Pugh	48,665	36.6
Democratic	Sheila Dixon	46,219	34.7
Democratic	Elizabeth Embry	15,562	11.7
Democratic	David Warnock	10,835	8.1
Democratic	Carl Stokes	4,620	3.5
Democratic	DeRay Mckesson	3,445	2.6
Total votes		133,009	100.00

=== 2020 Mayoral election ===
On December 14, 2019, Dixon announced she was running for mayor of Baltimore in the 2020 election. After the first campaign finance reporting date in mid January 2020, Dixon's campaign reported that it had raised roughly $100,000. Incumbent Mayor Jack Young, also running for mayor, had $960,000 cash on hand during the same reporting period. In the June 2, 2020 Democratic primary, she narrowly lost to Brandon Scott.

=== 2024 Mayoral election ===
In September 2023, Dixon announced that she would again run for mayor of Baltimore, setting up a rematch of the 2020 Democratic primary contest between Dixon and the now-incumbent mayor Brandon Scott. On May 14, 2024 she again lost the democratic primary to Mayor Scott.

== Personal life ==
Twice divorced, Dixon raised her two children, Jasmine and Joshua, as a single mom. She is the aunt of professional basketball player Juan Dixon, who led the University of Maryland to the 2002 NCAA championship, and Jermaine Dixon, who played guard for the University of Pittsburgh men's basketball team.

An active member of Bethel A.M.E. Church and former church trustee, Dixon continues to serve as a member of the Stewardess Board. She serves on other boards, including the Institute of Human Virology, the Transplant Resource Center, the Urban Health Initiative, the Baltimore Public Markets Corporation, the Living Classrooms Foundation, and the Walters Art Museum.

== See also ==
- List of first African-American mayors

Political offices
Preceded by Martin O'Malley	Mayor of Baltimore; 2007–2010	Succeeded by Stephanie Rawlings-Blake
