= Baltimore City Council =

Legislature of Baltimore, Maryland, U.S.

Type
- Type: Unicameral

Leadership
- Council President: Zeke Cohen, Democratic since December 5, 2024 (succeeded Nick J. Mosby)

Structure
- Seats: 15
- Political groups: Democratic (15)
- Committees: List: Budget and Appropriations Education and Youth Executive Appointments Health Housing and Community Development Judiciary and Legislative Investigations Labor Land Use and Transportation Public Safety Recreation and Parks Taxation, Finance, and Economic Development Urban Affairs and Aging

Elections
- Voting system: Electoral districts with four-year terms
- Last election: November 5, 2024

Meeting place
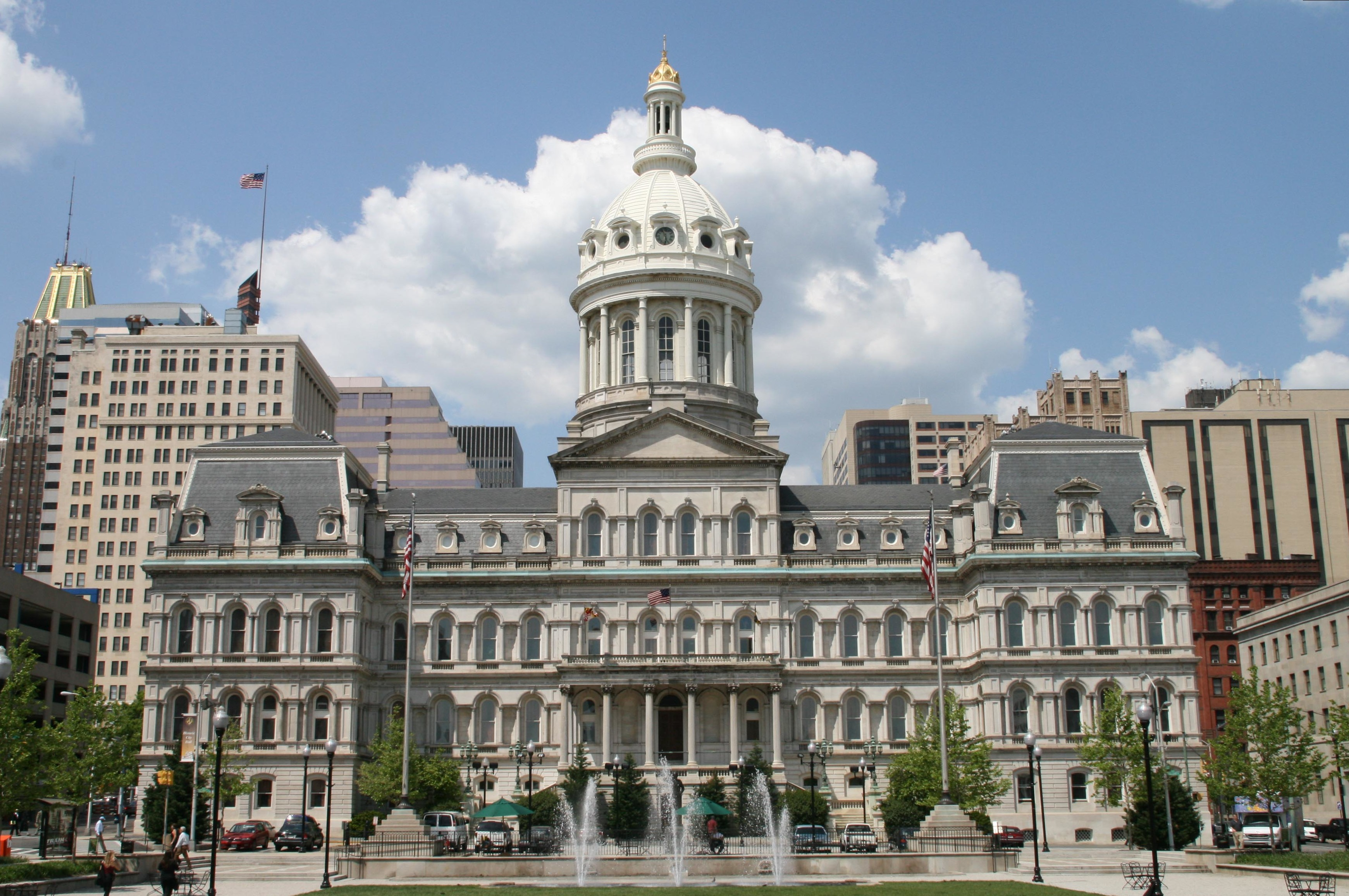
- Baltimore City Hall; Council Chamber; Baltimore, MD

Website
- Official website

The Baltimore City Council is the legislative branch that governs the City of Baltimore. It has 14 members elected by district and a president elected at-large; all serve four-year terms. The council holds regular meetings on alternate Monday evenings on the fourth floor of the Baltimore City Hall. The council has seven standing committees, all of which must have at least three members. As of 2022, the president receives an annual salary of $131,798, the vice president gets $84,729 and the rest of the councillors receive $76,660. The current city council president, Zeke Cohen, was sworn in on December 5, 2024.

== History ==
During its early history the council was composed exclusively of white, non-Jewish males. In 1826, the Maryland General Assembly passed the "Jew Bill", which allowed Jews to hold public office in the state. Two leaders in the fight for the law were Jacob I. Cohen Jr. (1789–1869) and Solomon Etting (1764–1847), who subsequently won election to the council and became the first Jewish officeholders in the state. In 1890, Harry Sythe Cummings was elected to the council, becoming the state's first black elected official. In the 40 years after 1890, six black Republicans won elections to the council.

In 2003, as a result of the ballot initiative Question P, the Baltimore City Council went from six three-member districts to 14 single-member districts. The council president continued to be elected at-large resulting in a legislative body consisting of a total of 15 members.

Since 1926, Baltimore City elections have occurred the year following the gubernatorial cycle with elected officials taking office in the same year as the election. From the 1920s to the 1970s city elections were held in the spring, with primary elections in March and the general election in May, with the winners also taking office in May. In the 1970s the elections were changed to the fall, with the primary occurring in September and the general in November and the winners taking office in December. In 2012 the city's elections were moved to coincide with the presidential election cycle. This changed the 2015 election to 2016 and gave councilmembers elected in 2011 a five-year term.

Reflecting the near-total dominance of the Democratic Party in city politics, no Republican has been elected to the council since 1939.

== City Council President ==
The council president is elected citywide. The council president presides over the council and serves as a voting member. In addition to their role on the council, the council president is also president of the Board of Estimates and serves as ex officio mayor pro tempore. In the event the mayor's office falls vacant, the council president automatically becomes mayor for the balance of the term. If the position of council president is vacant, the members of the council elect the new council president.

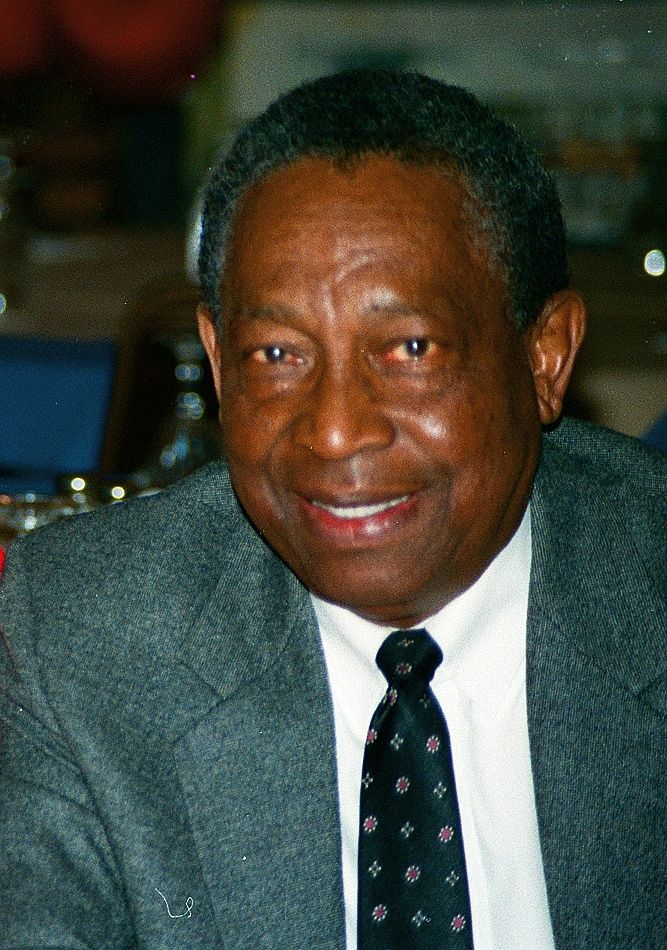
Clarence H. Burns (pictured in 1995) was the first African-American president.

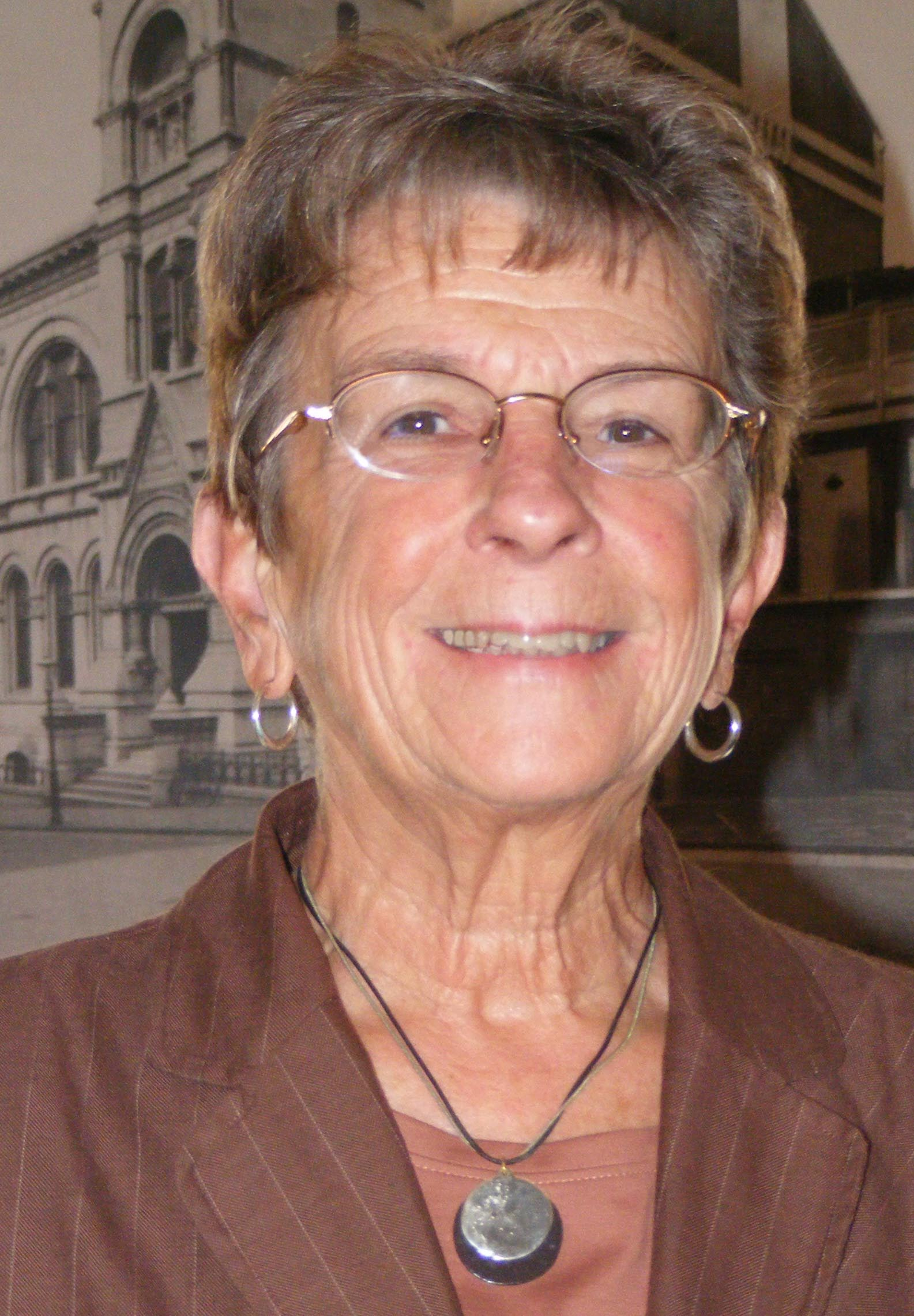
Mary Pat Clarke (pictured in 2007) was the first female president.

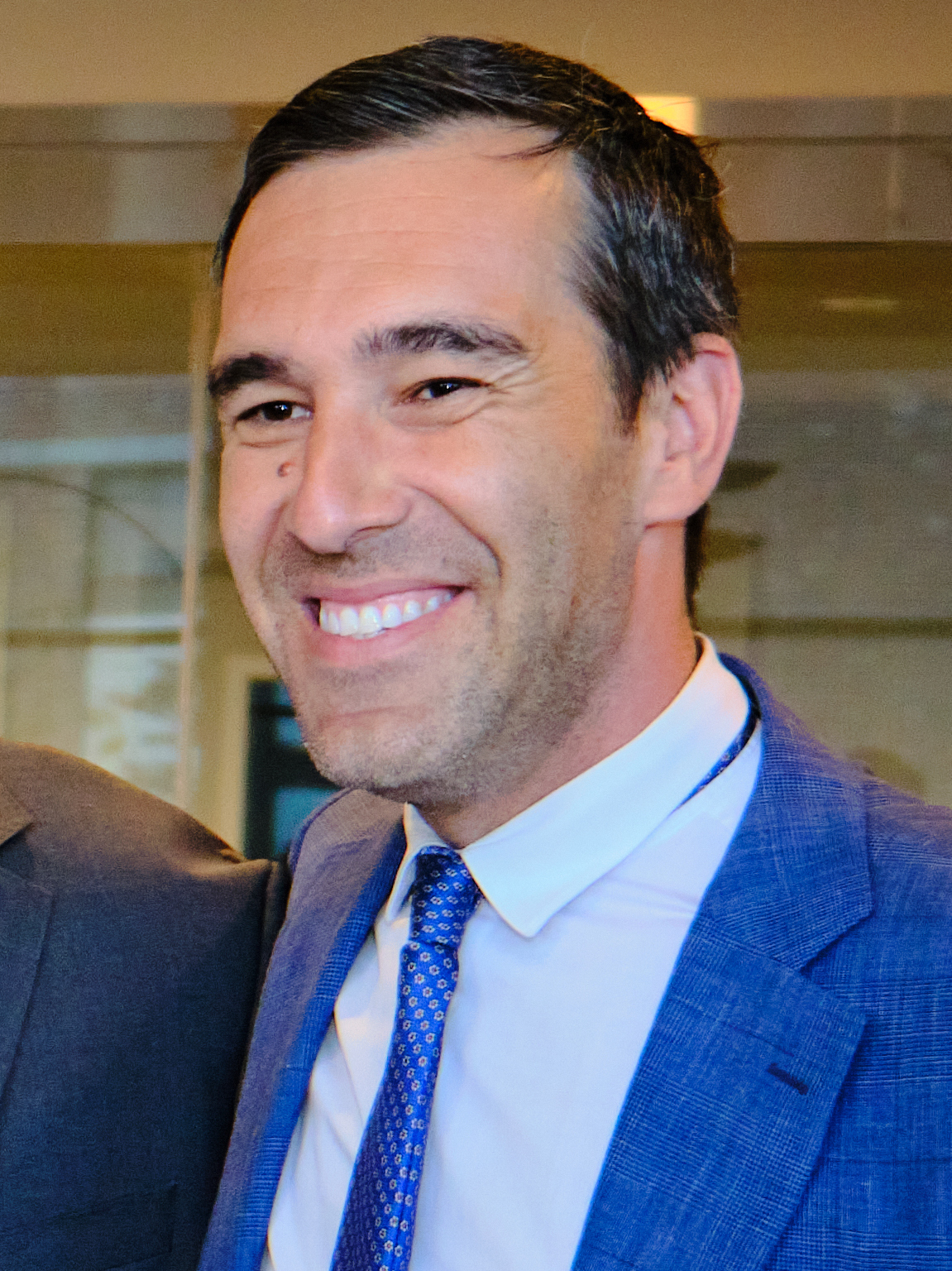
Zeke Cohen (pictured in 2023) is the incumbent president.

Term	Name	Party	Notes
1923–1930	Howard Bryant†	Democratic	Had been the president of the 2nd Branch of the City Council, prior to the change to a unicameral council. Died in office in September 1930.
1930–1931*	James O'Meara	Democratic**	Was vice president of the council and served as acting president following Bryant's death in September 1930. O'Meara was a Democrat, however he was elected and supported by the Republican members of the council, who he primarily voted with.
1931–1935	E. Lester Muller	Democratic	Lost re-election in the primary coming in third behind Sellmayer and John Meyer.
1935–1939	George Sellmayer	Democratic	In the 1935 election, John Meyer initially was called the winner on election night with 24 votes, after a recount, Sellmayer won. Lost re-election in the primary to O'Connell in 1939
1939–1943	Richard O'Connell	Democratic	Lost re-election in the primary to Conlon in 1943
1943	Thomas Conlon†	Democratic	Died in office. Served from May to October 1943
1943–1951	C. Markland Kelly♯	Democratic	First elected as Council President by the council in October 1943, following Conlon's death. Was re-elected in 1947. He chose to run for mayor as an independent in 1951 instead of re-election and lost in his bid for the mayoralty. Resigned as Council President 10 days early.
1951–1955	Arthur B. Price	Democratic	Elected by the voters in the 1951 election, and elected by the council to fill the last 10 days of Kelly's term. Ran for mayor in 1955 and lost the primary to Mayor Thomas D'Alesandro Jr.
1955–1959	Leon Abramson	Democratic	Running on a ticket with Mayor D'Alesandro, Abramson lost re-election in the primary to Goodman.
1959–1962	Philip Goodman♯	Democratic	In 1959 he ran on a joint ticket with J. Harold Grady for mayor and R. Walter Graham Jr. for comptroller, and all 3 won. Resigned as Council President in December 1962 to become mayor upon Grady's resignation of the mayoralty to become a judge
1962–1967	Thomas D'Alesandro III	Democratic	First elected Council President by the council in December 1962. Re-elected in 1963. Ran for mayor in 1967 and won.
1967–1971	William Donald Schaefer	Democratic	Ran for mayor in 1971 and won
1971–1982	Walter Orlinsky♯	Democratic	Resigned as Council President on October 18, 1982, due to conviction on bribery and corruption charges.
1982–1987	Clarence "Du" Burns♯	Democratic	Du Burns was the first African-American Council President. He was Council Vice President and first elected as Council President in October 1982 by the council following Orlinsky's resignation. Resigned as council president to become mayor in January 1987 following Mayor Schaefer's election as governor
1987	Frank X. Gallagher	Democratic	Served from January to December 1987. He was a 3rd District councilman and was elected Council President upon Burns' resignation to become mayor. He did not run for re-election in 1987, retiring from politics.
1987–1995	Mary Pat Clarke	Democratic	Mary Pat Clarke was the first female council president. She had previously served as a 2nd District councilwoman from 1975 to 1983 and had run for Council President in 1983, losing the primary to Burns. She ran for mayor in 1995 and lost the primary election to Mayor Kurt Schmoke
1995–1999	Lawrence Bell	Democratic	Ran for mayor in 1997 and lost the primary election to 3rd District Councilman Martin O'Malley
1999–2007	Sheila Dixon♯	Democratic	Resigned in January 2007 to become mayor following O'Malley's election as governor
2007–2010	Stephanie Rawlings-Blake♯	Democratic	She was the 6th District councilwoman and was first elected Council President by the council in January 2007 following Dixon's resignation. Resigned as council president to become mayor on February 4, 2010, due to Dixon's resignation as mayor following a corruption trial.
2010–2019	Bernard C. "Jack" Young♯	Democratic	He was the 12th district councilman and was first elected Council President by the council in February 2010 due to Rawlings-Blake's elevation to mayor. Resigned himself in May 2019 to become mayor.
2019	Sharon Green Middleton	Democratic	She served as Council President Ex-Officio from April 2, 2019, until May 6, 2019, while President Young served as Mayor Ex-Officio and between the time he succeeded to the mayoralty and the Council voted on Young's successor. She held this position as virtue of serving as Council Vice President and she was the 6th district councilwoman.
2019–2020	Brandon Scott	Democratic	He was the 2nd district councilman and was first elected Council President by the council on May 6, 2019, due to Young's resignation to become mayor
2020–2024	Nick Mosby	Democratic	He was a member of the Maryland House of Delegates from the 40th district and elected Council President in the November 2020 general election
2024–present	Zeke Cohen	Democratic	He was the 1st district councilman and elected Council President in the November 2024 general election after defeating then-council chair Nick Mosby in the Democratic primary

† Died in Office ♯ Resigned as Council President

== Records ==
The records of the City Council, dates ranging from 1797 to 1987, reside at the Baltimore City Archives in Record Group BRG16. The collection includes administrative files, volumes of proceedings, joint council session reports, correspondence, ordinances and resolutions, committee bills, hearing schedules, and other records.

== Members ==
=== Current members ===
District	Locale	Member	Party	Elected	Primary Committee
1	Southeast	Mark Parker	Democratic	2024	Education, Young, & Older Adults (vice chair)
2	Northeast	Danielle McCray	Democratic	Appointed June 2019	Budget (chair)
3	Morgan State, Harford Road	Ryan Dorsey	Democratic	2016	Transportation (chair)
4	York Road	Mark Conway	Democratic	2020	Public Safety (chair), Public Health & Environment (vice chair)
5	Northwest	Isaac Schleifer	Democratic	2016	Legislative Investigations (chair), Budget (vice chair)
6	Park Heights, Roland Park	Sharon Green Middleton	Democratic	2007	Council Vice President, Transportation & Land Use (vice chair)
7	Druid Hill, Mondawmin, Sandtown	James Torrence	Democratic	2020	Housing & Economic Development (chair), Labor & Workforce (vice chair)
8	Edmondson Village, Forest Park	Paris Gray	Democratic	2024	
9	West	John Bullock	Democratic	2016	Education, Young, & Older Adults (chair)
10	Cherry Hill	Phylicia Porter	Democratic	2020	Public Health & Environment (chair)
11	Downtown	Zac Blanchard	Democratic	2024	Public Safety (vice chair)
12	Greenmount, Jonestown	Jermaine Jones	Democratic	2024	Labor & Workforce (chair)
13	East Baltimore	Antonio Glover	Democratic	2020	Legislative Investigations (vice chair)
14	Charles Village	Odette Ramos	Democratic	2020	Housing & Economic Development (vice chair)
Council President	—N/a	Zeke Cohen	Democratic	2024	Council President

=== Former members ===
/ 1st / / / 2nd / / / 3rd / / / / 4th / / / 5th / / / / 6th; 1923-1927 / Frank G. Dotterneich / John C. Heethwecker / Edward J. Novack / Ambrose J. Kennedy / Edward S. Stanley / August Kleka / Thomas J. Flaherty / G. Edward Markley / Harry J. McClellan / / Beverly W. Smith / Daniel Ellison / William G. Towers / / John T. Ford / George M. Griffin / Chester P. Woodward / Frank F. Busch / Samuel Y. Harris / James J. O'Meara; 1927-1931 / Frank G. Dotterneich / Frank J. Baner / Edward J. Novack / James B. Blake / Philander B. Briscoe / August Kleka / John P. Brandan / Warren Burgess / Lawrence W. Houston / / Walter S. Emerson / Daniel Ellison / Warner T. McGuinn / / William G. Albrecht / Thomas L.A. Musgrove / Howard M. Rollins / Frank F. Busch / Samuel Y. Harris / James J. O'Meara; 1931-1934 / Frank G. Dotterneich / William I. Flynn / George W. Koning / James B. Blake / Philander B. Briscoe / August Kleka / Richard C. O'Connell / Joseph L. Ruth / Howard A. Sweeten / / Meyer Reamer / Daniel Ellison / Sidney R. Traub / / Jerome Sloman / Charles J. Wells / Thomas J. Collins / Frank F. Busch / Lawrence F. Awalt / William J. Murphy; 1934-1938 / William Bonnett / Thomas D'Alesandro, Jr. / James L. Hennegan / J. Robinson Boland / Philander B. Briscoe / James T. Klima / Richard C. O'Connell / John T. Mullin, Sr. / James B. Beale / / Meyer Reamer / Daniel Ellison / Sidney R. Traub / / Jerome Sloman / Charles J. Wells / John T Wills / Frank F. Busch / William J. Bailey / William J. Murphy; 1939-1943 / William Bonnett / Samuel N. Friedel / Lawrence F. Appel / James B. Blake / John F. Conroy / James T. Klima / James F. Arthur / George Hyde Fallon / James B. Beale / / Leon Abramson / Daniel Ellison / Jacob J. Edelman / / Jerome Sloman / Charles J. Wells / John T Wills / Frank F. Busch / John J. Griffen / Robert Viehmyer; 1943-1947 / William Bonnett / Samuel N. Friedel / Simon P. Jarosinski / Medio Walt / John F. Conroy / James T. Klima / James F. Arthur / George Hyde Fallon / John T Mullin, Sr. / / Leon Abramson / Maxwell Alpert / Jacob J. Edelman / / Jerome Sloman / Charles J. Wells / Charles E. Falter / Ella A. Bailey / Edward A. Freburger / Louis W. Kotmair; 1947-1951 / William Bonnett / John T. Booth / Simon P. Jarosinski / Medio Walt / Ambrose J. Kennedy, Jr. / Anthony F. DiDomenico / James F. Arthur / Walter J. Dewees / John T Mullin, Sr. / / Leon Abramson / Maxwell Alpert / Jacob J. Edelman / H. Warren Buckler Jr. / Jerome Sloman / William J. Muth / John H. Reed / John J. McMenamen / Edward A. Freburger / Charles H. Wenger; 1951-1955 / William Bonnett / James J. Duffy / Joseph A. Bertorelli / C. Lyman Schueler / Ambrose J. Kennedy, Jr. / Anthony F. DiDomenico / Anna F. Arthur / Walter J. Dewees / John T Mullin, Sr. / C. Meredith Boyce / Leon Abramson / Maxwell Alpert / Jacob J. Edelman / Frank J. Flynn / Samuel N. Friedel / Phillip H. Goodman / John H. Reed / John J. McMenamen / Michael J. McHale / William M. Hudnet; 1955-1959 / William Bonnett / James J. Duffy / Joseph J. Staszak / C. Lyman Schueler / Chester J. Ray / James Joseph Welsh, Jr. / Anna F. Arthur / J. Joseph Curran / Richard D. Byrd / Henry R. Hergenroeder / Walter T. Dixon / Maxwell Alpert / Maurice J. Soypher / William Donald Schaefer / Michael J. Hankin / Jacob J. Edelman / Leon A. Ruben Stein / Thomas P. Fallon / Michael J. McHale / William M. Hudnet; 1959-1963 / William Bonnett / James J. Duffy / Joseph J. Staszak / C. Lyman Schueler / Clement J. Prucha / Anthony F. DiDomenico / Peter G. Angelos / George W. Arthur / Frank X. Gallagher / Henry R. Hergenroeder / Walter T. Dixon / Maxwell Alpert / Maurice J. Soypher / William Donald Schaefer / Soloman Liss / Jacob J. Edelman / Leon A. Ruben Stein / Thomas P. Fallon / Michael J. McHale / William M. Hudnet; 1963-1967 / William Bonnett / James J. Duffy / Joseph J. Staszak / Charles Panuska / Clement J. Prucha / Thomas H Ward / J. Joseph Curran / George W. Arthur / Frank X. Gallagher / John A. Pica / Walter T. Dixon / Henry G. Parks, Jr. / Maurice J. Soypher / William Donald Schaefer / Reuben Caplan / Jacob J. Edelman / Leon A. Ruben Stein / Dominic M. Leone / John J. Hines / William J. Myers; 1967-1971 / William Bonnett / James J. Duffy / Dominic 'Mimi' DiPietro / Joseph V. Mach / Clement J. Prucha / Robert L. Douglass / J. Joseph Curran / Robert C. Embry Jr. / Frank X. Gallagher / / Victorine Q. Adams / Henry G. Parks, Jr. / Emerson R. Julian / / Reuben Caplan / Jacob J. Edelman / Alexander Stark / Dominic M. Leone / John J. Hines / William J. Myers; 1971-1975 / John A. Schaefer / Barbara A. Mikulski / Dominic 'Mimi' DiPietro / Clarence H. 'Du' Burns / Robert J. Fitzpatrick / Robert L. Douglass / J. Joseph Curran / Carroll J. Fitzgerald / Frank X. Gallagher / / Victorine Q. Adams / Mary B. Adams / Emerson R. Julian / / Reuben Caplan / Allen B. Spector / Alexander Stark / Dominic M. Leone / Charles H. Wheatley / William J. Myers; 1975-1979 / John A. Schaefer / Barbara A. Mikulski / Dominic 'Mimi' DiPietro / Clarence H. 'Du' Burns / Mary Pat Carke / Nathan C. Irby, Jr. / J. Joseph Curran / Carroll J. Fitzgerald / Frank X. Gallagher / / Victorine Q. Adams / Michael B. Mitchell / Emerson R. Julian / / Reuben Caplan / Allen B. Spector / Thomas J.S. Waxter Jr. / Dominic M. Leone / Joseph P. Murphy / William J. Myers; 1979-1983 / John A. Schaefer / Donald G. Hammen / Dominic 'Mimi' DiPietro / Clarence H. 'Du' Burns / Mary Pat Carke / Nathan C. Irby, Jr. / Martin E Curran / Carroll J. Fitzgerald / Frank X. Gallagher / / Victorine Q. Adams / Michael B. Mitchell / Emerson R. Julian / / Norman Reeves / Thomas J.S. Waxter Jr. / Rochelle 'Rikki' Spector / George Della, Jr. / / William J. Myers; 1983-1987 / John A. Schaefer / Donald G. Hammen / Dominic 'Mimi' DiPietro / Anthony J. Ambridge / Jacqueline F. McLean / Nathaniel J. McFadden / Martin E Curran / Joseph Jodie T. Landers III / Frank X. Gallagher / / Kweisi Mfume / Michael B. Mitchell / Agnes B. Welch / / Iris G. Reeves / Thomas J.S. Waxter Jr. / Rochelle 'Rikki' Spector / Joseph J. DiBlasi / Timothy D. Murphy / William J. Myers; 1987-1991 / John A. Schaefer / Nicholas C. D'Adamo, Jr. / Dominic 'Mimi' DiPietro / Anthony J. Ambridge / Jacqueline F. McLean / Carl Stokes / Martin E Curran / Joseph Jodie T. Landers III / Wilber E. Cunningham / / Lawrence A. Bell / Sheila Dixon / Agnes B. Welch / / Iris G. Reeves / Vera P. Hall / Rochelle 'Rikki' Spector / Joseph J. DiBlasi / Timothy D. Murphy / William J. Myers; 1991-1995 / John L. Cain / Nicholas C. D'Adamo, Jr. / Peter Sfikas / Anthony J. Ambridge / Paula Johnson Branch / Carl Stokes / Martin E Curran / Martin O'Malley / Wilber E. Cunningham / / Lawrence A. Bell / Sheila Dixon / Agnes B. Welch / / Iris G. Reeves / Vera P. Hall / Rochelle 'Rikki' Spector / Joseph J. DiBlasi / Timothy D. Murphy / Melvin L. Stukes; 1995-1999 / John L. Cain / Nicholas C. D'Adamo, Jr. / Lois Garey / Anthony J. Ambridge / Paula Johnson Branch / Robert L. Douglass / Robert W. 'Bobby' Curran / Martin O'Malley / Joan Carter Conway / / Keiffer J. Mitchell, Jr. / Sheila Dixon / Agnes B. Welch / / Helen L. Holton / Stephanie C. Rawlings-Blake / Rochelle 'Rikki' Spector / Norman A. Handy, Sr. / Edward L. Reisinger / Melvin L. Stukes; 1999-2004 / John L. Cain / Nicholas C. D'Adamo, Jr. / Lois Garey / Bea Gaddy / Paula Johnson Branch / Bernard C. 'Jack' Young / Robert W. 'Bobby' Curran / Lisa Joi Stancil / Kenneth Harris, Sr. / / Keiffer J. Mitchell, Jr. / Catherine E. Pugh / Agnes B. Welch / / Helen L. Holton / Stephanie C. Rawlings-Blake / Rochelle 'Rikki' Spector / Norman A. Handy, Sr. / Edward L. Reisinger / Melvin L. Stukes
	1st	2nd	3rd	4th	5th	6th	7th	8th	9th	10th	11th	12th	13th	14th					
2004–2007	James (Jim) Kraft (D)	Nicholas (Nick) D'Adamo (D)	Robert (Bob) Curran (D)	Kenneth Harris (D)	Rochelle (Rikki) Spector (D)	Stephanie Rawlings-Blake (D)* Sharon Green Middleton (D)	Belinda Conaway (D)	Helen Holton (D)	Agnes Welch (D)	Edward (Ed) Reisinger (D)	Keiffer Mitchell (D)	Bernard C “Jack” Young (D)	Paula Johnson Branch (D)*** Vernon Crider (D)	Mary Pat Clarke (D)					
2007–2011	James (Jim) Kraft (D)	Nicholas (Nick) D'Adamo (D)	Robert (Bob) Curran (D)	Bill Henry (D)	Rochelle (Rikki) Spector (D)	Sharon Green Middleton (D)	Belinda Conaway (D)	Helen Holton (D)	Agnes Welch (D)^ William "Pete" Welch (D)	Edward (Ed) Reisinger (D)	William "Bill" Cole IV (D)	Jack Young (D)^^ Carl Stokes (D)	Warren Branch (D)	Mary Pat Clarke (D)					
2011–2016	James (Jim) Kraft (D)	Brandon Scott (D)^^^	Robert (Bob) Curran (D)	Bill Henry (D)	Rochelle (Rikki) Spector (D)	Sharon Green Middleton (D)	Nick Mosby (D)	Helen Holton (D)	William "Pete" Welch (D)	Edward (Ed) Reisinger (D)	William "Bill" Cole IV (D)** Eric Costello (D)	Carl Stokes (D)	Warren Branch (D)	Mary Pat Clarke (D)					
2016–2020	James (Jim) Kraft (D)	Brandon Scott (D)^^^	Robert (Bob) Curran (D)	Bill Henry (D)	Rochelle (Rikki) Spector (D)	Sharon Green Middleton (D)	Zeke Cohen (D)	Helen Holton (D)	Ryan Dorsey (D)	Edward (Ed) Reisinger (D)	Isaac (Yitzy) Schleifer (D)	Leon Pinkett (D)	Warren Branch (D)	Mary Pat Clarke (D)	Kristerfer Burnett (D)	John Bullock (D)	Eric Costello (D)	Robert Stokes (D)	Shannon Sneed (D)
2020–2024	Danielle McCray (D)	Mark Conway (D)	James Torrence (D)	Bill Henry (D)	Phylicia Porter (D)	Sharon Green Middleton (D)	Zeke Cohen (D)	Antonio Glover (D)	Ryan Dorsey (D)	Edward (Ed) Reisinger (D)	Isaac (Yitzy) Schleifer (D)	Odette Ramos (D)		Mary Pat Clarke (D)	Kristerfer Burnett (D)	John Bullock (D)	Eric Costello (D)	Robert Stokes (D)	
2024-2028	Danielle McCray (D)	Mark Conway (D)	James Torrence (D)	Mark Parker (D)	Phylicia Porter (D)	Sharon Green Middleton (D)	Paris Gray (D)	Antonio Glover (D)	Ryan Dorsey (D)	Zachary Blanchard (D)	Isaac (Yitzy) Schleifer (D)	Odette Ramos (D)	Jermaine Jones (D)			John Bullock (D)			

*Elected Council President by the council in January 2007. Sharon Green Middleton was elected by the council to fill Rawlings-Blake's seat.

^ Agnes Welch resigned her seat December 2010. The council elected her son William "Pete" Welch to fill her seat in January 2011. He was re-elected in 2011 and lost the primary in 2016.

** Bill Cole resigned his seat on August 30, 2014, to become the president of the Baltimore Development Corporation. Eric Costello was elected by the council in October 2014.

^^Bernard C. "Jack" Young was elected Council President by the council in February 2010. The Council elected former councilman Carl Stokes to the seat.

***Paula Johnson Branch resigned her seat on March 2, 2007. The council elected Vernon Crider to the seat on April 16, 2007, and he lost re-election in the primary later that year.

^^^Brandon Scott was elected Council President by the council on May 6, 2019.

== Election results ==
=== 2020 ===
All 14 seats on the city council are being defended by the Democrats in the 2020 election.

Baltimore City Council elections, 2020
Party	Candidates	Votes			Seats		
Party	Candidates	No.	%	∆pp	No.	∆No.	%
Maryland Democratic Party	14	183,627	89.53	+4.09	14	0	100.00
Maryland Republican Party	9 (Note: Donna Rzepka was an official write-in for District 1)	14,007	6.83	-1.28	0	0	0.00
Maryland Green Party	1	4,868	2.37	-0.45	0	0	0.00
Write-in	N/A	2,609	1.27	-0.02	0	0	0.00
Ujima People's Progress Party	0	0	0	-0.54	0	0	0.00
Total		205,111	100.00	±0	14	±0	100.00

Democrats are also defending the separately elected position of City Council President.

President of the Baltimore City Council Election, 2020
Party	Candidate	Votes	%
Democratic	Nick Mosby	178,689	79.5%
Republican	Jovani Patterson	42,628	19.0%
Other	Write-ins	3,361	1.5%
Total votes		224,678	100.00
Democratic hold			

=== 2016 ===
All 14 seats on the city council were retained by the Democrats in the 2016 election.

Baltimore City Council Elections, 2016
Party	Candidates	Votes			Seats		
Party	Candidates	No.	%	∆pp	No.	∆No.	%
Maryland Democratic Party	14	174,070	85.44	+2.49	14	0	100.00
Maryland Republican Party	8	16,529	8.11	+1.48	0	0	0.00
Maryland Green Party	4	5,749	2.82	+0.58	0	0	0.00
Unaffiliated	3	3,650	1.79	+1.79	0	0	0.00
Write-in	N/A	2,633	1.29	−5.98	0	0	0.00
Ujima People's Progress Party	1	1,107	0.54	+0.54	0	0	0.00
Maryland Libertarian Party	0	0	0	-0.89	0	0	0.00
Total		203,738	100.00	±0	14	±0	100.00

In addition to retaining absolute control of the City Council, the Democrats held the separately elected position of City Council President.

President of the Baltimore City Council Election, 2016
Party	Candidate	Votes	%
Democratic	Bernard C. "Jack" Young	173,065	76.0
Republican	Shannon Wright	27,408	12.0
Green	Connor Meek	11,119	4.9
Independent	Sharon Black	8,368	3.7
Libertarian	Susan Gaztanaga	6,380	2.8
Other	Write-ins	1,300	0.6
Total votes		227,640	100.00
Democratic hold			

=== 2011 ===
All 14 seats on the city council were being defended by the Democrats in the 2011 election.

Baltimore City Council Elections, 2011
Party	Candidates	Votes			Seats		
Party	Candidates	No.	%	∆pp	No.	∆No.	%
Maryland Democratic Party	14	38.779	82.95	N/A	14	0	100.00
Write-in	N/A	3,397	7.27	N/A	0	0	0.00
Maryland Republican Party	8	3,103	6.63	N/A	0	0	0.00
Maryland Green Party	2	1,051	2.24	N/A	0	0	0.00
Maryland Libertarian Party	3	417	0.89	N/A	0	0	0.00
Total		46,747	100.00	±0	14	±0	100.00

Democrats also defended the separately elected position of City Council President.

President of the Baltimore City Council Election, 2011
Party	Candidate	Votes	%
Democratic	Bernard C. "Jack" Young	38,708	82.7%
Republican	David A. Wiggins	4,967	10.6%
Libertarian	Lorenzo Gaztanaga	2,480	5.3%
Other	Write-ins	670	1.4%
Total votes		46,825	100.00
Democratic hold			
