= 2024 Baltimore mayoral election =

- November 5, 2024
- Turnout: 58.35% ▼2.53 pp
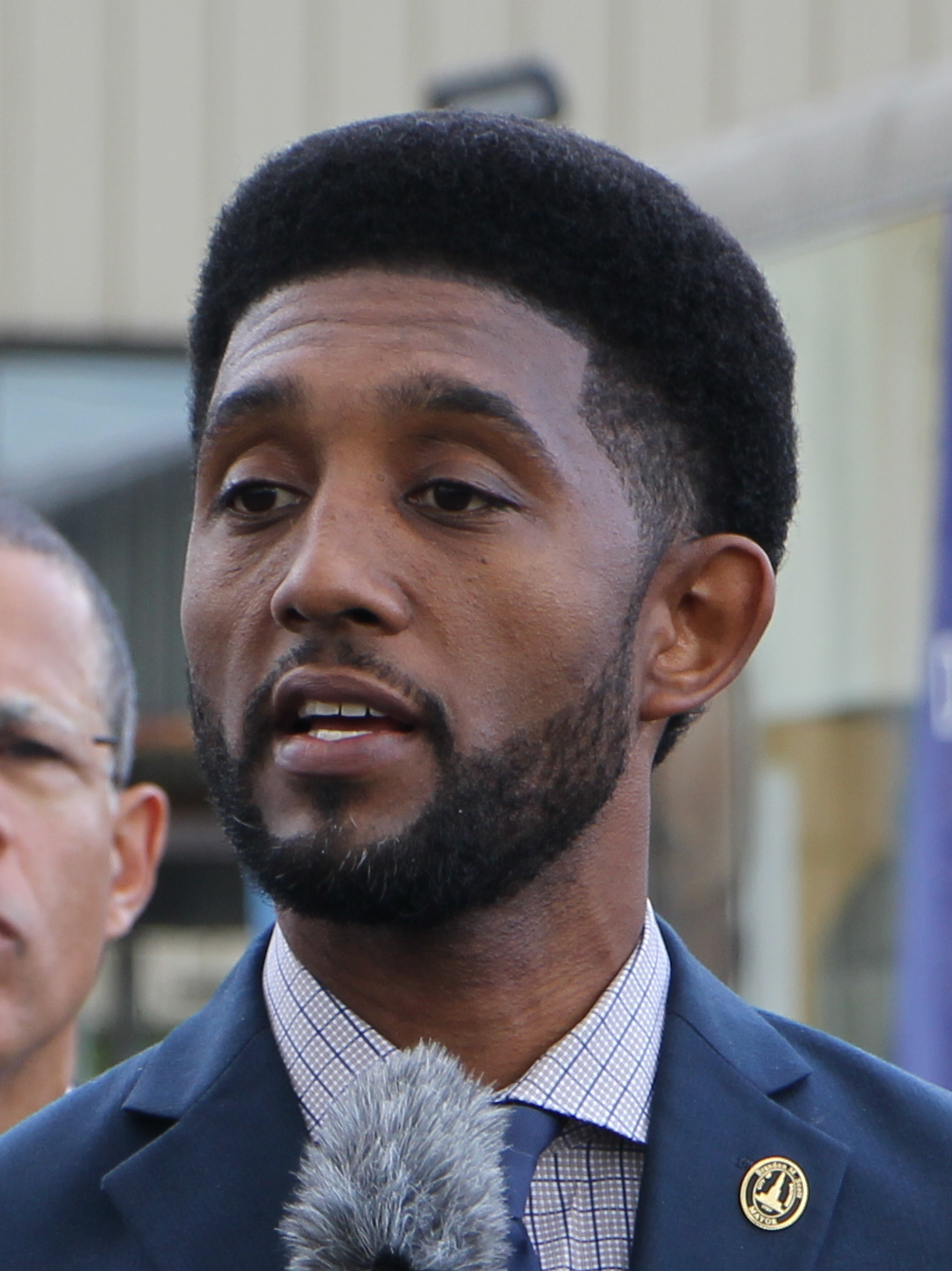

Nominee	Brandon Scott	Shannon Wright
Party	Democratic	Republican
Popular vote	179,732	36,484
Percentage	82.15%	16.68%
- Precinct results Scott: 50–60% 60–70% 70–80% 80–90% >90% Wright: 50–60% 60–70% No votes
Mayor before election
Brandon Scott
Democratic
Elected Mayor
Brandon Scott
Democratic

The 2024 Baltimore mayoral election was held on November 5, 2024, to elect the mayor of Baltimore, Maryland.

Incumbent Brandon Scott was first elected in 2020 with 70.5% of the vote and ran re-election to a second term in 2024. Scott was considered vulnerable, as polls found that Baltimore residents were split on his performance as mayor. He faced criticism for his handling of important issues in the city, including schools, constituent services, and crime. However, Scott's response to the Francis Scott Key Bridge collapse, as well as his progress in growing the economy and reducing homicides, allowed him to make inroads with voters and boost his approval rating.

Scott defeated former mayor Sheila Dixon in the Democratic primary, a result that is considered tantamount to victory in the heavily Democratic city. His path to victory involved running up massive margins in Baltimore's majority-white precincts while running close to Dixon in its majority-Black areas. Scott defeated Republican challenger Shannon Wright in the general election on November 5, 2024, becoming the first mayor to win re-election to a second term since Martin O'Malley.

== Democratic primary ==
=== Candidates ===
==== Nominee ====
- Brandon Scott, incumbent mayor (2020–present)

==== Eliminated in primary ====
- Wayne Baker
- Texas Brown, hospitality manager
- Wendy Bozel, teacher
- Sheila Dixon, former mayor (2007–2010) and candidate in 2016 and 2020
- Kevin Harris, Community College of Baltimore County faculty
- Wendell Hill-Freeman, marketing executive
- Yolanda Pulley, activist and candidate for mayor in 2020
- Joseph E. Scott (Note: Unrelated to Brandon Scott)
- Keith B. Scott, candidate for mayor in 2020
- Robert Wallace, businessman and independent candidate for mayor in 2020
- Yasaun Young, candidate for mayor in 2020

==== Withdrawn ====
- Thiruvendran Vignarajah, former Maryland deputy attorney general and candidate for mayor in 2020 (endorsed Dixon, remained on ballot)

==== Declined ====
- Zeke Cohen, city councilor from the 1st district (2016–present) (ran for city council president)
- Eric Costello, city councilor from the 11th district (2014–present) (ran for re-election, endorsed Dixon)
- Bill Henry, Baltimore City Comptroller (2020–present) (ran for re-election)
- Nick Mosby, president of the Baltimore City Council (2020–present) and former state delegate from the 40th district (2017–2020) (ran for re-election)

=== Endorsements ===
Wendy Bozel

Organizations

- Maryland Forward Party
Sheila Dixon

U.S. senators

- Barbara Mikulski, Maryland (1987–2017)

State legislators

- Jill P. Carter, state senator from LD-41 (2018–present)
- Samuel I. Rosenberg, state delegate from LD-41 (1983–present)

Local officials

- Ivan Bates, Baltimore State's Attorney (2023–present)
- Sam Cogen, Baltimore Sheriff (2023–present)
- Eric Costello, city councilor from the 11th district (2014–present)

Individuals

- David D. Smith, executive chairman of Sinclair Broadcast Group and co-owner of The Baltimore Sun (Republican)
- Thiruvendran Vignarajah, former Maryland deputy attorney general and candidate for mayor in 2020 and 2024

Labor unions

- International Longshoremen's Association Local 333
Brandon Scott

U.S. senators

- Ben Cardin, Maryland (2007–2025)
- Chris Van Hollen, Maryland (2017–present)

Statewide elected officials

- Anthony Brown, Maryland Attorney General (2023–present)

State legislators

- Jackie Addison, state delegate from LD-45 (2023–present)
- Marlon Amprey, state delegate from LD-40 (2021–present)
- Nick Charles, state senator from LD-25 (2023–present)
- Mark Edelson, state delegate from LD-46 (2023–present)
- Arthur Ellis, state senator from LD-28 (2019–present)
- Jazz Lewis, state delegate from LD-24 (2017–present)
- Robbyn Lewis, state delegate from LD-46 (2017–present)
- Cory McCray, state senator from LD-45 (2019–present)
- Alonzo T. Washington, state senator from LD-22 (2023–present)
- Nicole A. Williams, state delegate from LD-22 (2019–present)
- Caylin Young, state delegate from LD-45 (2023–present)

County officials

- Calvin Ball III, Howard County Executive (2018–present)
- Jessica Fitzwater, Frederick County Executive (2022–present)
- Marc Elrich, Montgomery County Executive (2018–present)
- Johnny Olszewski, Baltimore County Executive (2018–present)
- Steuart Pittman, Anne Arundel County Executive (2019–present)

Local officials

- John Bulllock, city councilor from the 9th district (2016–present)
- Kristerfer Burnett, city councilor from the 8th district (2016–present)
- Ryan Dorsey, city councilor from the 3rd district (2016–present)
- Danielle McCray, city councilor from the 3rd district (2019–present)
- Sharon Green Middleton, vice president of the Baltimore City Council (2016–present) from the 6th district (2007–present)
- Phyilicia Porter, city councilor from the 10th district (2020–present)
- James Torrence, city councilor from the 7th district (2020–present)

Individuals

- Ben Jealous, executive director of Sierra Club, former president and CEO of the NAACP, and nominee for governor of Maryland in 2018

Organizations

- Bikemore
- Maryland Sierra Club
- People for the American Way

Labor unions

- American Federation of State, County and Municipal Employees Council 3
- International Association of Fire Fighters Locals 734 and 964
- Metropolitan Baltimore AFL-CIO
- Service Employees International Union Locals 1199, 32BJ, and 500
- United Auto Workers

Newspapers

- Baltimore Afro-American
Declined to endorse

Statewide elected officials

- Wes Moore, governor of Maryland (2023–present)

=== Debates and forums ===
2024 Baltimore mayoral election Democratic primary debates
No.	Date	Host	Moderator	Link	Participants				
P Participant A Absent N Non-invitee I Invitee									
P Participant A Absent N Non-invitee I Invitee					Sheila Dixon	Brandon Scott	Thiru Vignarajah	Bob Wallace	Others
1	February 28, 2024	"More than two dozen environmental groups"	Tom Hall; Lisa Snowden	N/A	P	A	P	P	P (Note: Wendy Bozel, Kevin Harris, Wendell Hill-Freeman, Yolanda Pulley, and Keith Scott)
2	March 4, 2024	North Baltimore neighborhood associations	Karsonya Wise Whitehead	YouTube	P	P	P	P	–
3	April 11, 2024	Bikemore; The Real News Network	Jaisal Noor	YouTube	P	P	P	P	–
4	April 13, 2024	North Baltimore neighborhood associations	Claudia Wilson	N/A	P	P	P	P	–
5	April 17, 2024	WBAL-TV	Jason Newton	Website	P	P	P	P	–
6	April 30, 2024	The Baltimore Banner; WYPR	Emily Sullivan; Tom Hall; Denise Koch	YouTube	P	P	P	P	–
7	May 7, 2024	Baltimoreans United In; Leadership Development	Kevin Daniels; Melissa Zieve; Andrew Connors	Facebook	P	P	W	N	–

=== Fundraising ===
Campaign finance reports as of April 26, 2024
Candidate	Raised	Spent	Cash on hand
Sheila Dixon (D)	$916,517	$811,374	$110,082
Kevin Harris (D)	<$1,000	<$1,000	N/A
Wendell Hill-Freeman (D)	<$1,000	<$1,000	N/A
Yolanda Pulley (D)	<$1,000	<$1,000	N/A
Brandon Scott (D)	$1,262,407	$1,244,937	$449,952
Robert Wallace (D)	$529,207 (Note: $352,685 of this total was self-funded by Wallace.)	$131,323	$415,233
Thiru Vignarajah (D) (Note: Withdrawn candidate)	$718,013 (Note: $600,826 of this total was funded by the taxpayer-funded Baltimore City Fair Election Fund.)	$195,787	$522,226
Source: Maryland State Board of Elections

=== Polling ===
Poll source	Date(s) administered	Sample size (Note: Key: A – all adults RV – registered voters LV – likely voters V – unclear)	Margin of error	Sheila Dixon	Brandon Scott	Thiru Vignarajah	Bob Wallace	Other	Undecided
OpinionWorks (Note: This poll was sponsored by The Baltimore Sun and WBFF)	April 7–11, 2024	508 (LV)	± 4.3%	35%	38%	10%	4%	5% (Note: Wendy Bozel, Kevin Harris, Joseph Scott, Texas Brown, and "Someone else" with 1%)	7%
Goucher College	April 3–7, 2024	440 (RV)	± 4.7%	32%	40%	11%	3%	3% (Note: "Some other candidate" with 2%, "Refused" with 1%)	10%
Garin-Hart-Yang Research Group (Note: Poll sponsored by Sheila Dixon)	February 24–26, 2024	400 (LV)	± 5%	40%	37%	10%	6%	–	8%
Lake Research Partners	October 16–22, 2023	800 (LV)	± 3.5%	39%	31%	–	10%	–	15%
Goucher College	September 19–23, 2023	537 (RV)	± 4.2%	39%	27%	–	–	23% (Note: "Some other candidate" with 23%. 33% of those voters lean Dixon, 36% lean Scott, and 21% reported no lean or said they wouldn't for either)	8%

Hypothetical polling

Poll source	Date(s) administered	Sample size	Margin of error	Eric Costello	Sheila Dixon	Bill Henry	Jayne Miller	Brandon Scott	Thiru Vignarajah	Undecided
Lake Research Partners (Note: Poll was sponsored by Bill Henry)	Late March 2023	500 (LV)	± 4.4%	3%	18%	6%	7%	21%	11%	34%

=== Results ===
Results by precinct
Scott
- 40–50%
- 50–60%
- 60–70%
- 70–80%
- 80–90%
Dixon
- 30–40%
- 40–50%
- 50–60%
- 60–70%
- 70–80%
Tie 40–50%
No data

Results by city council district

Democratic primary results
Party	Candidate	Votes	%
Democratic	Brandon Scott (incumbent)	48,806	52.8%
Democratic	Sheila Dixon	35,947	38.9%
Democratic	Thiruvendran Vignarajah (withdrawn)	3,379	3.7%
Democratic	Robert Wallace	2,823	3.1%
Democratic	Wendy Bozel	338	0.4%
Democratic	Kevin Harris	248	0.3%
Democratic	Wayne Baker	210	0.2%
Democratic	Yolanda Pulley	238	0.3%
Democratic	Joseph E. Scott	115	0.1%
Democratic	Keith B. Scott	108	0.1%
Democratic	Wendell Hill-Freeman	98	0.1%
Democratic	Yasaun Young	92	0.1%
Democratic	Texas Brown	60	0.1%
Total votes		92,462	100%

== Republican primary ==
=== Candidates ===
==== Nominee ====
- Shannon Wright, nonprofit executive and nominee for mayor in 2020

==== Eliminated in primary ====
- Michael Moore, activist
- Donald Scoggins, urban planner and perennial candidate

=== Endorsements ===
Shannon Wright

Statewide elected officials

- Bob Ehrlich, former governor of Maryland (2003–2007)
- Michael Steele, former Republican National Committee chairman (2009–2011) and former lieutenant governor of Maryland (2003–2007)

=== Debates and forums ===
Scoggins, Moore, and Wright attended the candidate forum sponsored by over two dozen environmental groups on February 28, 2024.

=== Fundraising ===
Campaign finance reports as of April 2, 2024
Candidate	Raised	Spent	Cash on hand
Michael Moore (R)	<$1,000	<$1,000	N/A
Donald Scoggins (R)	$410	$0	$410
Shannon Wright (R)	<$1,000	<$1,000	N/A
Source: Maryland State Board of Elections

=== Results ===
Results by precinct Wright: 30–40%; 40–50%; 50–60%; 60–70%; 70–80%; 80–90%; >90%; Moore: 30–40%; 40–50%; 50–60%; 60–70%; 70–80%; >90%; Scoggins: 40–50%; 50–60%; 60–70%; >90%; Tie: 30–40%; 40–50%; 50%; No data/no votes

Republican primary results
Party	Candidate	Votes	%
Republican	Shannon Wright	1,468	39.8%
Republican	Michael Moore	1,331	36.1%
Republican	Donald Scoggins	887	24.1%
Total votes		3,686	100%

== Third-party candidates ==
=== Candidates ===
==== Failed to qualify ====
- Timothy Sewell (Independent)

==== Withdrawn ====
- Chukwuemeka Egwu (Independent)

=== Debates and forums ===
Egwu attended the candidate forum sponsored by over two dozen environmental groups on February 28, 2024.

== General election ==
=== Results ===
2024 Baltimore mayoral election
Party	Candidate	Votes	%	±%
Democratic	Brandon Scott (incumbent)	179,732	82.15%	+11.66%
Republican	Shannon Wright	36,484	16.68%	+9.55%
Write-in		2,574	1.18%	+0.75%
Total votes		218,790	100.00%	

== Notes ==
Partisan clients
