= David D. Smith =

American businessman (born 1950)

David Smith
- Born: David Deniston Smith; 1950 or 1951 (age 75–76)
- Spouse: Jane Smith
- Father: Julian Smith

David Deniston Smith (born 1950 or 1951) is an American businessman who has been the executive chairman of Sinclair Broadcast Group (SBGI) since 1990. In 1988, he became its president and CEO. He stepped down as CEO in 2017, but remains chairman. In 2024, he acquired majority ownership of The Baltimore Sun (founded 1837) and its affiliated regional and community newspapers. As of 2018, his estimated net worth was US$325 million.

== Early life ==
David Deniston Smith is the son of Julian Sinclair Smith (1921–1993), founder of Sinclair Broadcast Group, and Carolyn Beth Cunningham. He has three brothers—Frederick, J. Duncan and Robert. As a child he lived in the Bolton Hill neighborhood of Baltimore, and attended The Baltimore City College (high school), graduating in 1969.

== Career ==
=== Sinclair Broadcast Group ===
From 1971 to 1978, Smith worked at WBFF-TV, channel 45, which began operations in 1971 as the first commercial UHF television station in the city / media market (and run by his father), He first was in charge of maintenance operations. He devised a plan for "selling pornographic videos in Baltimore's red-light district during the 1970s." He founded Comark Communications in 1978.

In 1985, WBFF (then affiliated with Fox Broadcasting Company) was rebranded, with two other stations, as "Sinclair". David Smith was the chief executive officer and president of Sinclair Television Group, Inc. from 1988 to January 2017. He "built Sinclair Broadcast Group Inc. into the largest owner of television stations in the U.S.," and he was profiled by The New York Times in 1998. He has been executive chairman of SBGI since January 1, 2017. It has been reported that every news station under Sinclair's umbrella is required to syndicate commentary that comports with its owners' ideological views.

In 1996, Smith was arrested for soliciting a prostitute and charged with a misdemeanor sex offense. His charges were dropped after he agreed to a deal that saw Sinclair broadcast reports publicizing local drug programs.

In September 2013, his shareholding in SBGI was valued at $268 million. His total calculated compensation was $5,206,439 as of fiscal year 2016.

Prior to Ajit Pai's appointment under the first Donald Trump presidential administration as chairman of the Federal Communications Commission (FCC), Smith met with Pai to discuss deregulation of the FCC's media ownership rules. This meeting, plus Sinclair having been granted additional access to Donald Trump's presidential campaign, resulted in accusations that Sinclair was currying favor with the Trump administration in exchange for deregulation of the industry. In a meeting with Republican Party presidential candidate Donald Trump during the 2016 presidential election year, Smith told Trump, "We are here to deliver your message."

In January 2024, it was revealed that Smith was financing a high-profile lawsuit accusing Baltimore City Public Schools of defrauding taxpayers all while WBFF-TV was extensively reporting on the case without disclosing Smith's role. A spokesperson for Sinclair Broadcast Group stated that Smith had not been involved in any of the reporting or editorial decisions concerning the station's coverage of the lawsuit and pledged to "appropriately disclose" Smith's role in future coverage of the lawsuit. After this, school system attorneys subpoenaed Smith to testify under oath in the case. Smith appeared in court on April 8, during which he objected to 64 questions, regularly invoking the First and Fourteenth Amendment to the United States Constitution.

In July 2026, Smith threatened to sue Maryland governor Wes Moore over comments he made on MS NOW in which the he attempted to tie Smith to Jeffrey Epstein. Moore refused to retract his comments, noting that Epstein's funds held several hundred thousand dollars worth of investments in Sinclair Broadcast Group while Smith served as the broadcaster's chairman and CEO. Smith filed a lawsuit against Moore over his comments later that month.

=== The Baltimore Sun ===
In January 2024, Smith reached a private agreement to buy The Baltimore Sun from the venture capital group Alden Global Capital, who had also just recently purchased the media properties from Tribune Publishing (longtime national media syndicate founded by the Chicago Tribune) then emerging from bankruptcy and a long period of financial instability. He is also the owner of other Baltimore-area news publications, like Capital Gazette papers in Annapolis, Carroll County Times, The Howard County Times, Towson Times and several other Baltimore-area weeklies and magazines. According to The Baltimore Banner, Smith personally purchased The Sun for more than $100 million.

After acquiring the newspaper, Smith held a three-hour meeting with staff where he reportedly told employees that he had only had read the paper four times in the past few months, insulted the quality of their journalism, and encouraged them to emulate WBFF-TV. He also seemingly tried to pit reporters against each other, asking them to rank who was the best in the newsroom and saying that he has "no idea what you do" to reporters several times during the meeting. According to an audio recording of the meeting obtained by The Baltimore Banner, Smith opined on the killing of Freddie Gray and subsequent protests, claimed that graduates of Baltimore City Schools were destined to be welfare recipients for the rest of their lives, and asserted that Senate President Bill Ferguson and House Speaker Adrienne A. Jones were scared of what WBFF-TV could do to them. He also accused Baltimore's school system of committing widespread fraud, which was condemned as "offensive" by a spokesperson for the city's schools.

Since Smith's acquisition of the newspaper, the Baltimore Sun's coverage has become more conservative and focused more on Baltimore mayor Brandon Scott and his administration, as well as the issue of crime in Baltimore. The paper also started republishing content from WBFF-TV and conservative news wire The Center Square, as well as publishing columns written by Smith's daughter and features promoting restaurants owned by Atlas Restaurants Group, which is owned by Smith's nephew, prompting criticism from the Baltimore Sun Guild. Many of the Baltimore Sun's journalists, including several with the Baltimore Sun Guild, have left the company as a result of changes made under by Smith and conservative columnist Armstrong Williams in the year following their acquisition of the newspaper. The Baltimore Sun Guild also accused the new owners of stalling contract negotiations with the paper's unionized reporters; Smith denied these accusations, telling Sun photographer Amy Davis that he had multiple union employees across the country and that he'd been negotiating with unions for fifty years, despite employee testimony that Smith threatened to shut down WBFF-TV after its employees started talking about forming a union.

In April 2026, Politico reported that Smith had issued a new mandate to Baltimore Sun staff to "expose fraud and misdeeds among Democratic politicians in the state", and that Smith was "deeply involved" with the paper's investigations into Maryland governor Wes Moore. Semafor also reported that The Sun had brought on a team of investigators from WBFF-TV to comb through Moore's records, including his military record as well as his high school and collegiate basketball tenure, as Moore ran for re-election in 2026 and was viewed as a potential candidate in the 2028 United States presidential election. According to records shared by Moore's office with Semafor, Smith attempted to recall an email that was accidentally sent to Moore's communications director, David Turner, accusing Moore and his communications team of "failing repeatedly to answer the most basic questions about his time in the Army and his deployment to Afghanistan", despite Smith not having been visibly included on the original emails. Later that month, Moore criticized Smith's ownership of The Baltimore Sun, lamenting how the newspaper used to be the city's "paper of record" and has since declined into "right-wing tribble".

=== Other ventures ===
In September 1991, Ed Hale appointed Smith to the board of directors of Baltimore Bancorp, the parent company of Bank of Baltimore. Smith resigned from the board in April 1992, citing disagreements with Hale.

=== Involvement in Baltimore politics ===
Smith has claimed that he does not care about politics, and that they are "meaningless" to him, despite his large contributions to political causes. Smith's involvement in Baltimore politics has been criticized by Baltimore mayor Brandon Scott, who has described Smith's efforts to finance initiatives to shrink Baltimore city government as a means to suppress "free or liberated Black political power" in the city.

During the 2020 Baltimore mayoral election, Smith financed a lawsuit against mayoral candidate T.J. Smith, following WBFF-TV reports about an arrangement that allowed him to keep his Anne Arundel County Police Department pension while working for the city. The lawsuit was dismissed in 2021, with a judge finding that there was nothing illegal or improper about the arrangement; plaintiff James Braswell appealed the ruling to the Maryland Appellate Court, which affirmed the lower court's decision in September 2022. The Smith family also donated to the mayoral campaign of Thiru Vignarajah, and WBFF-TV hosted an hourlong forum with Vignarajah after other candidates backed out of a debate on the station.

During the 2022 Maryland elections, Smith spent at least $385,000 toward canvassing efforts to collect 10,000 signatures and host public awareness campaigns in an effort to place two ballot questions on the ballots of Baltimore voters. The first ballot question, which made it into the ballot, would limit city politicians to two four-year terms in each office, while the second ballot question, which did not gather enough signatures to gain ballot access, would have created a process to allow for elected officials to be recalled. The term limits ballot initiative passed with 71 percent of city residents approving. Smith later characterized the ballot initiative as "a test, because I was curious".

During the 2024 Baltimore mayoral election, Smith sought to recruit candidates to run against Baltimore mayor Brandon Scott in the Democratic primary. That year, Smith and real estate developer John Luetkemeyer Jr. formed a super PAC to support the mayoral campaign of former Baltimore mayor Sheila Dixon, with Smith and members of his family repeatedly donating thousands of dollars to the political action committee throughout the primary. He also donated to the re-election campaign of Baltimore city council member Eric Costello. Both Costello and Dixon were defeated in the Democratic primary election on May 14, 2024.

==== 2024 Baltimore Question H ====
Baltimore Question H results by precinct Opposition: 50–60%; 60–70%; 70–80%; 80–90%; Support: 50–60%; 60–70%; Tie 50% No data

During the 2024 Maryland elections, Smith spent $415,000 financing another petitioning effort for Question H, a ballot initiative to shrink the size of the Baltimore City Council from 14 districts to 8 districts. During the campaign, WBFF-TV aired a 22-minute program called "In Depth with Mikenzie Frost" to discuss ballot questions on the city and Baltimore County ballots as well as one statewide question; the program dedicated four times as much coverage to the city council ballot question as it did other city ballot questions.

Following their victories in the Democratic primary, Scott, Zeke Cohen, and numerous members of the city council campaigned against the ballot initiative, organizing a "Baltimore City Is Not for Sale" campaign and establishing a fundraising committee with the name "Stop Sinclair". In an interview, Scott argued that Smith's political efforts in Baltimore were about returning control of the majority-Black Baltimore to a group of wealthy white men. In an op-ed published in The Baltimore Sun in August 2024, Smith said he wasn't backing the measure out of some desire to "consolidate political power" and accused Scott of lying about Sinclair's involvement as part of his campaign to protect the status quo in Baltimore's government. In October 2024, Sinclair Broadcast Group attorneys called on Stop Sinclair to cease and desist publishing claims that the media company was involved in the initiative, saying that the claims "jeopardizes our position of trust in the community". Stop Sinclair refused to comply with the cease and desist.

On November 5, 2024, Baltimore voters rejected Question H, with more than 62% of residents voting against it. According to a precinct-level analysis by The Baltimore Banner, support for the ballot question came from Baltimore's most impoverished communities, while opposition came from nearly three-fourths of the city's majority-Black neighborhoods and most strongly from Baltimore's majority-white neighborhoods.
