= Jack Young (politician) =

American politician (born 1954)

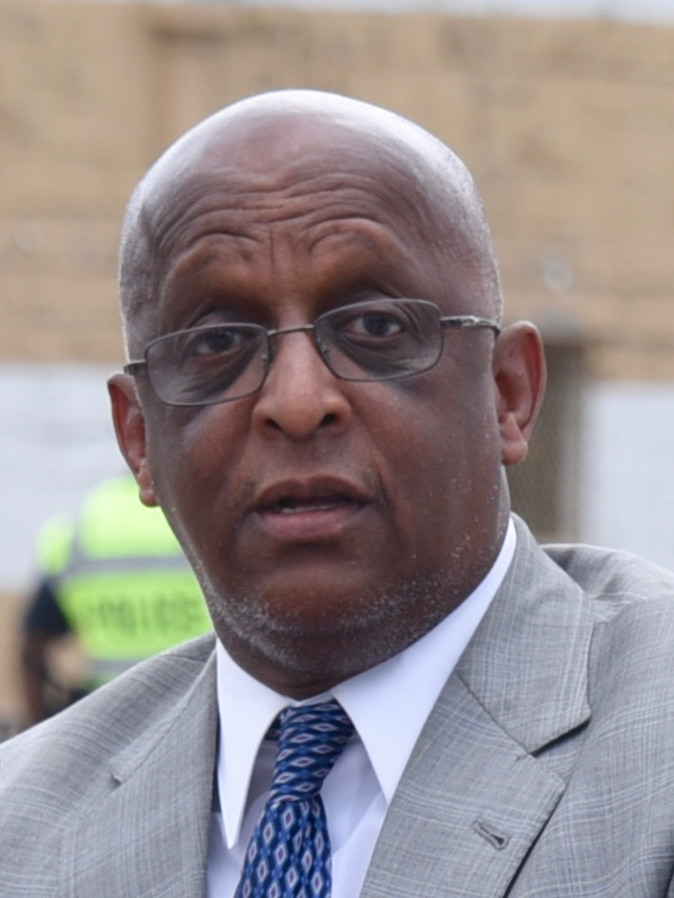
- Young in 2017

52nd Mayor of Baltimore
- In office May 2, 2019 – December 8, 2020; Acting: April 2, 2019 – May 2, 2019
- Preceded by: Catherine Pugh
- Succeeded by: Brandon Scott

President of the Baltimore City Council
- In office February 8, 2010 – May 2, 2019^{[a]}
- Preceded by: Stephanie Rawlings-Blake
- Succeeded by: Brandon Scott

Member of the Baltimore City Council
- In office December 1996 – February 8, 2010
- Preceded by: Tony Ambridge; Jacqueline McClean; Carl Stokes
- Succeeded by: Carl Stokes
- Constituency: 2nd district (1996–2005); 12th district (2005–2010)

Personal details
- Born: June 26, 1954 (age 72) Baltimore, Maryland, U.S.
- Party: Democratic
- Education: Baltimore City Community College
- Website: Campaign website Government website
- Green Middleton served as Acting President while Young served as Acting Mayor

Bernard C. "Jack" Young (born June 26, 1954) is an American politician and former mayor of Baltimore, Maryland. A member of the Democratic Party, Young was elected to the Baltimore City Council in 1996, representing Baltimore's second district. In 2010, Young became City Council President following Stephanie Rawlings-Blake taking over as mayor due to the indictment of Sheila Dixon. On April 2, 2019, Young was named acting mayor during the leave of absence by Mayor Catherine Pugh. Following Pugh's resignation on May 2, 2019, Young was fully vested as mayor of the city. In October 2019, Young announced that he was running to retain his position as Mayor in the 2020 election. He lost the Democratic nomination for mayor, despite raising more money than the other candidates. Instead, Brandon Scott won the nomination for mayor in the 2020 general election, which he went on to win.

== Background ==
Jack Young graduated from Northern High School in Baltimore and attended Baltimore City Community College. Young was originally elected to represent Baltimore City Council District 2 in 1996, which he represented until 2003 when district lines were redrawn. After redistricting, he represented District 12 until he was appointed as City Council President in February 2010 to fill the vacancy left when Stephanie Rawlings-Blake was elevated to mayor.

== Career ==
At Johns Hopkins Hospital, Young first worked in the cafeteria and mailroom before joining the radiology department as a file clerk and eventually an administrator, helping digitize the department archives. By the late 1980s, Young began spending his evenings and weekends serving on the staff of Baltimore City Council member Mary Pat Clarke. From 2007 to 2010, Young was a manager at the Maryland Department of Human Resources. He has been a member of the Historic East Baltimore Community Action Council since 1995, and is a co-founder of the Broadway Development Foundation.

Young created controversy in 2009 when he said that "it should be required that all top-level people live in the city," referring to a report by the Baltimore Examiner that most Baltimore City police commanders don't live in the city. On February 1, 2010, WBAL-TV's Jayne Miller reported that Young himself owned a home in Harford County for which he had signed an affidavit that declared the Harford County home was his primary residence. Young said the house in Harford County had served as his summer home until he sold it in 2005.

In February 2010, Councilman Young was unanimously nominated to fill the position of City Council President after former City Council President Stephanie Rawlings-Blake was sworn in as Mayor of Baltimore following the resignation of former Mayor Sheila Dixon.

== Mayor of Baltimore (2019–2020) ==
Young was elevated to Acting Mayor on April 2, 2019, when then Mayor Catherine Pugh went on an indefinite leave of absence to recover from pneumonia. The announcement coincided with a scandal over a "self-dealing" book-sales arrangement by Pugh. On May 2, 2019, Pugh resigned and Young became mayor of the city.

In July 2019, Young said that Baltimore would not assist ICE agents with immigration raids. He said in a statement: "Immigrants who call Baltimore home should not live in fear of family separation and deportation, and I will continue to do all that is in my power so that all Baltimore residents, including immigrants, feel safe and welcome in our city."

=== 2020 Mayoral race ===
After the first campaign finance reporting date in mid-January 2020, Young led all candidates with $960,000 cash on hand, Thiru Vignarajah reported having about $840,000, Brandon Scott had nearly $430,000 cash on hand and Sheila Dixon had raised $100,000. Despite this, he would eventually finish 5th in the Democratic primary.

== Post-mayoral career ==
Following his loss, Young moved to White Marsh. In June 2025, he wrote to members of the Baltimore County Council to oppose a redistricting plan that would create a second majority-Black councilmanic district in the county, calling it gerrymandered, saying that he felt that "compacting a district based on racial demographics" was counterproductive.

== See also ==
- List of mayors of Baltimore
- List of mayors of the 50 largest cities in the United States
- Baltimore City Council President

Political offices
Preceded by Catherine Pugh	Mayor of Baltimore; 2019–2020	Succeeded by Brandon Scott
