= Ebony Thompson =

Baltimore city solicitor

- Born: c. 1978 (age 47–48); Baltimore, Maryland, U.S.
- Education: Brown University, University of Baltimore School of Law
- Occupation: Lawyer
- Employer(s): U.S. Marine Corps Reserve, Venable LLP, Baltimore City Council

Ebony Monet Thompson (born c. 1978) is an African-American lawyer and former United States reserve marine from Maryland. In 2024, Thompson became the first woman and first openly gay city solicitor in Baltimore's 294-year history.

== Biography ==
Thompson is a native of Baltimore, Maryland. She received a bachelor's degree in economics from Brown University prior to attending law school at the University of Baltimore. In 2013, at the age of 34, Thompson graduated with a Juris Doctor degree from the University of Baltimore School of Law. After law school, Thompson worked as a litigator at Venable LLP, where her great-uncle is a partner.

In 2022, Thompson became Baltimore deputy city solicitor. That year, Mayor Brandon Scott named Thompson to replace retiring solicitor James L. Shea. In January 2023, she became acting city solicitor, after questions arose about Thompson's qualification required for the role in the city charter. According to the charter, Baltimore city solicitors were required to have ten years of tenure at the Maryland Bar, which Thompson was one year shy of. Thompson accepted the role in an acting capacity until she could claim the full decade of service requirement. In June, the city council raised Thompson's salary by 30%. Later that year, Thompson and the City of Baltimore filed a lawsuit against the Bureau of Alcohol, Tobacco and Firearms after the federal agency did not respond to the city's Freedom of Information Act requests concerning firearm data.

On January 29, 2024, Thompson was sworn in as Baltimore's city solicitor. Thompson's appointment was unanimously confirmed by Baltimore City Council. She became the first woman, and first openly gay city solicitor in Baltimore's 294-year history.

Since becoming acting city solicitor, Thompson has been responsible for bringing lawsuits against Allergan, CVS, Cardinal Health, Walgreens and Teva Pharmaceuticals for their role in perpetuating Baltimore's opioid crisis. As of 2025, Baltimore has received more than $600 million in restitution as a result of lawsuits Thompson brought against drug manufacturers and distributors, said to be the largest in the city's history. In her role as Baltimore city solicitor, Thompson has additionally spearheaded efforts to track vacant properties in the city using blockchain technology.

=== Personal life and honors ===
Thompson is a single mother of three daughters whom she conceived via IVF. In addition to her legal work, she served eight years in the U.S. Marine Corps Reserve and practices karate. In 2024, she received the Beacon of Justice Award in recognition for her significant impact on Maryland's LGBTQ+ community.

In January 2025, Thompson was appointed grand marshal of Baltimore's Martin Luther King Jr. parade, under the theme, "Building Bridges, Breaking Barriers".
