= Global Refuge =

American non-profit organization

- Founded: 1939; 87 years ago
- Type: Non-governmental
- Tax ID no.: 132574854
- Legal status: Non-profit
- Headquarters: Baltimore, Maryland, U.S.
- Region served: United States
- President and CEO: Krish O'Mara Vignarajah
- Affiliations: Evangelical Lutheran Church in America, Latvian Evangelical Lutheran Church in America
- Revenue: US$300 million (2017)
- Employees: 550
- Website: www.globalrefuge.org
- Formerly called: Lutheran Immigration and Refugee Service

Global Refuge, formerly known as Lutheran Immigration and Refugee Service, is a non-profit organization that supports refugees and migrants entering the United States. It is one of nine refugee resettlement agencies working with the Office of Refugee Resettlement and one of two that serves unaccompanied refugee minors. Global Refuge also advocates for policies and practices relating to immigration and detention.

As an organization, Global Refuge originated from the response of American Lutherans in 1939 to the needs of Europeans displaced because of World War II, but the roots of the organization reach back to the 1860s when the New York Ministerium and the Pennsylvania Ministerium joined together to help and protect Lutheran immigrants in the US. Since then the organization's scope has expanded to include any refugees entering the US, support for asylum seekers and migrants, and services to unaccompanied children (UACs).

Global Refuge continues to be a faith-based organization and maintains collaborative relationships with the Evangelical Lutheran Church in America and the Latvian Evangelical Lutheran Church in America.

As of 2019 the president and CEO is Krish O'Mara Vignarajah.
