= 2020 Baltimore mayoral election =

- November 3, 2020
- Turnout: 60.88% ▲ pp
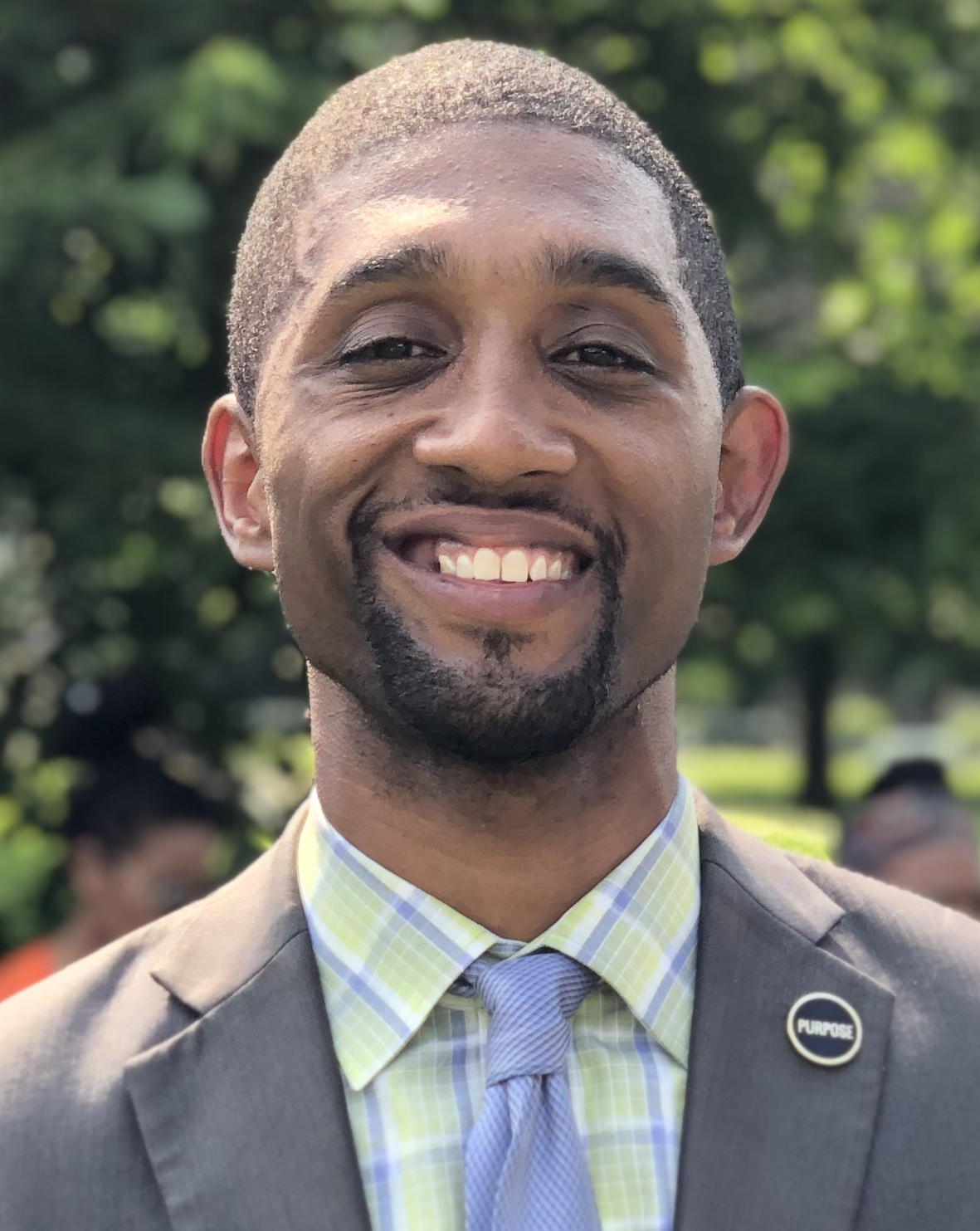

Nominee	Brandon Scott	Bob Wallace	Shannon Wright
Party	Democratic	Independent	Republican
Popular vote	164,661	47,275	16,664
Percentage	70.49%	20.24%	7.13%
- Precinct results Scott: 30–40% 40–50% 50–60% 60–70% 70–80% 80–90% No votes
Mayor of Baltimore before election
Jack Young
Democratic
Elected Mayor of Baltimore
Brandon Scott
Democratic

The 2020 Baltimore mayoral election was held on November 3, 2020, concurrent with the general election. Baltimore City Council President Brandon Scott, the Democratic Party nominee, won a sizable victory over independent candidate Bob Wallace, Republican Party nominee Shannon Wright, and Working Class Party nominee David Harding.

Incumbent acting mayor Jack Young, who unsuccessfully ran for the Democratic Party nomination, had become mayor following the resignation of Catherine Pugh. Pugh's resignation had come after she was embroiled in a scandal.

Scott won the Democratic nomination in a crowded primary election that had 24 candidates listed on the ballot. Six of these candidates received in excess of 5 percent of the vote. With 29.6% of the vote, Scott's margin-of-victory over former mayor Sheila Dixon's second-place finish was 2.1%. The acting incumbent, Young, placed a weak fifth, with 6.2% of the vote. In addition to Scott, Dixon, and Young, the primary included the candidacies of businesswoman and former United States Department of the Treasury executive Mary J. Miller; former Maryland Deputy Attorney General Thiruvendran Vignarajah; and former county and police department press secretary/spokesperson T.J. Smith. State Senator Mary L. Washington also ran and was listed on the ballot, but had suspended her campaign before the election. In the Republican primary, Shannon Wright defeated six other candidates. The Democratic primary had 148,405 votes cast, while the Republican primary only had 5,608 votes.

The primary elections were originally scheduled to be held on April 28, 2020, with early voting running from April 16 to 23. Due to the coronavirus pandemic, however, Maryland Governor Larry Hogan announced on March 17, 2020, that the primary election would be postponed to June 2.

== Background and candidates ==
Incumbent Mayor Jack Young, took office by default on May 2, 2019, following the resignation of Mayor Catherine Pugh. In October 2019, Young announced that he would seek election to remain mayor in 2020.

Notable events since the 2016 election include an escalation of crime following the death of Freddie Gray in April 2015, the removal of Confederate monuments and memorials in 2017, the 2018 rebranding and launch of the BaltimoreLink bus system following Governor Larry Hogan's cancellation of the Red Line, and the Healthy Holly scandal which resulted in Mayor Pugh's resignation in 2019.

== Democratic primary ==
After the first campaign finance reporting date in mid-January 2019, Bernard C. "Jack" Young had $960,000 cash on hand, Thiru Vignarajah reported having about $840,000, Brandon Scott had nearly $430,000, Rikki Vaughn $218,000 cash on-hand, Mary Washington had more than $116,000, Sheila Dixon had nearly $89,000, Carlmichael "Stokey" Cannady had nearly $36,000, and T.J. Smith had about $22,000.

=== Declared candidates ===
- Carlmichael "Stokey" Cannady, anti-violence activist and mediator
- Lou Catelli (a.k.a. Will Bauer), unofficial "mayor of Hampden"
- Valerie L. Cunningham
- Sheila Dixon, former mayor of Baltimore and 2016 mayoral candidate
- Liri Fusha
- Sean B. Gresh, author, professor of communications, former IBM Global Smart Cities communications lead
- Michael Douglas Jensen, private citizen
- Ralph E. Johnson Jr., author
- James Hugh Jones, II, 2018 Democratic gubernatorial candidate
- Terry Jay McCready
- Mary J. Miller, former T. Rowe Price executive and former Acting Deputy Secretary of the U.S. Department of the Treasury
- Erik Powery
- Yolanda Pulley, property manager and tenant activist
- Brian J Salsberry
- Brandon M. Scott, Baltimore City Council president
- Keith B. Scott
- T.J. Smith, former press secretary to the Baltimore County Executive and former Baltimore City Police spokesperson
- Dante Swinton, environmental justice researcher and community organizer
- Rikki Vaughn, MBA, 2016 U.S. Senate candidate and multi-restaurant businessman
- Thiruvendran "Thiru" Vignarajah, former Maryland Deputy Attorney General
- Robert Wallace, Independent candidate and businessman
- Frederick Ware-Newsome, perennial candidate
- Bernard C. "Jack" Young, incumbent acting mayor of Baltimore
- Yasaun Young (no affiliation or relation to Jack Young)

=== Withdrawn candidates ===
- Lynn Sherwood Harris, former president of the Sandtown-Winchester Improvement Association — withdrew candidacy on September 23, 2019
- Mary Washington, Maryland State Senator for District 43 — suspended campaign on March 16, 2020

=== Declined to be candidates ===
- Jill P. Carter, Maryland State Senator for District 41 and 2007 mayoral candidate
- Bill Ferguson, President of the Maryland Senate
- Ben Jealous, Former Director of the NAACP and 2018 Maryland gubernatorial candidate
- Nick Mosby, Maryland State Delegate for District 40

=== Polling ===
View source data.

Poll source	Date(s) administered	Sheila Dixon	Brandon Scott	Thiru Vignarajah	Jack Young	T.J. Smith	Mary Miller	Mary Washington	Undecided
Gonzales Research	May 14, 2019	23%	–	16%	19%	–	–	–	24%
Baltimore Fox 45	January 14, 2020	15.7%	17.9%	18.2%	15%	11%	–	–	12.2%
GQR Research/Sheila Dixon (Note: Poll sponsored by Dixon's campaign)	February 6–10, 2020	20%	16%	11%	11%	13%	2%	9%	17%
Fox Gonzales	February 26, 2020	17%	11%	15%	9%	15%	–	–	–
WYPR, Baltimore Sun	March 4, 2020	16%	10%	10%	6%	9%	7%	–	31%
WYPR, U of Baltimore Baltimore Sun	May 11–18, 2020	18%	15%	11%	5%	6%	18%	–	22%
Mason-Dixon Polling & Strategy	March 24, 2020	18%	15%	12%	7%	22%	9%	–	15%

=== Results ===
Democratic primary results
Party	Candidate	Votes	%
Democratic	Brandon Scott	43,927	29.6
Democratic	Sheila Dixon	40,782	27.5
Democratic	Mary Miller	23,193	15.6
Democratic	Thiru Vignarajah	17,080	11.5
Democratic	Bernard C. "Jack" Young (incumbent)	9,256	6.2
Democratic	T. J. Smith	8,593	5.8
Democratic	Carlmichael Cannady	2,473	1.7
Democratic	Mary Washington	1,028	0.7
Democratic	Valerie Cunningham	339	0.2
Democratic	Keith Scott	303	0.2
Democratic	Yasaun Young	188	0.1
Democratic	Ralph Johnson, Jr.	177	0.1
Democratic	Yolanda Pulley	152	0.1
Democratic	Lou Catelli	151	0.1
Democratic	Dante Swinton	143	0.1
Democratic	Michael Jenson	131	0.1
Democratic	Brian Salsberry	129	0.1
Democratic	Rikki Vaughn	116	0.1
Democratic	Liri Fusha	57	0.0
Democratic	Terry McCready	46	0.0
Democratic	Sean Gresh	45	0.0
Democratic	James Jones II	33	0.0
Democratic	Erik Powery	32	0.0
Democratic	Frederick Ware-Newsome	31	0.0
Total votes		148,405	100.00

== Republican primary ==
=== Declared candidates ===
- Zulieka A. Baysmore
- Catalina Byrd, political strategist and member of Baltimore's Women's Commission and Community Oversight Task Force
- Ivan Gonzalez
- William G. Herd, private citizen
- Collins Otonna, 2016 independent candidate for mayor
- David Anthony Wiggins, Ranking Member, 2nd Councilmanic District, Baltimore City Republican Central Committee, Co-founder Temple Afrika, Inc, President, Baltimore Black Think Tank Incorporated
- Shannon Wright, nonprofit executive and former pastor, nominee for Baltimore City Council President in 2016

=== Results ===
Republican primary results
Party	Candidate	Votes	%
Republican	Shannon Wright	1,630	29.1%
Republican	Catalina Byrd	1,068	19.0%
Republican	William Herd	757	13.5%
Republican	David Anthony Wiggins	729	13.0%
Republican	Ivan Gonzalez	671	12.0%
Republican	Zulieka Baysmore	641	11.4%
Republican	Collins Otonna	112	2.0%
Total votes		5,608	100%

== Independent ==
=== Declared candidates ===
- Kahan Singh Dhillon Jr. filed his candidacy but failed to submit the required number of signatures and does not appear on the general election ballot.
- David Harding, Working Class Party
- Robert Wallace, Independent candidate and businessman

== General election ==
=== Polling ===
Poll source	Date(s) administered	Sample size (Note: Key: A – all adults RV – registered voters LV – likely voters V – unclear)	Margin of error	Brandon Scott (D)	Shannon Wright (R)	Robert Wallace (I)	Undecided
GSG/Brandon Scott (Note: Poll sponsored by Scott's campaign)	September 4–6, 2020	400 (LV)	± 4.9%	65%	6%	14%	16% (Note: Includes "Refused")

=== Results ===
2020 General Election
Party	Candidate	Votes	%
Democratic	Brandon Scott	164,661	70.49
Independent	Bob Wallace	47,275	20.24
Republican	Shannon Wright	16,664	7.13
Working Class	David Harding	3,973	1.70
Write-in		1,007	0.43
Total votes		233,580	100

== Notes ==
Partisan clients
