= Krish O'Mara Vignarajah =

Immigration and refugee activist

Krish Vignarajah
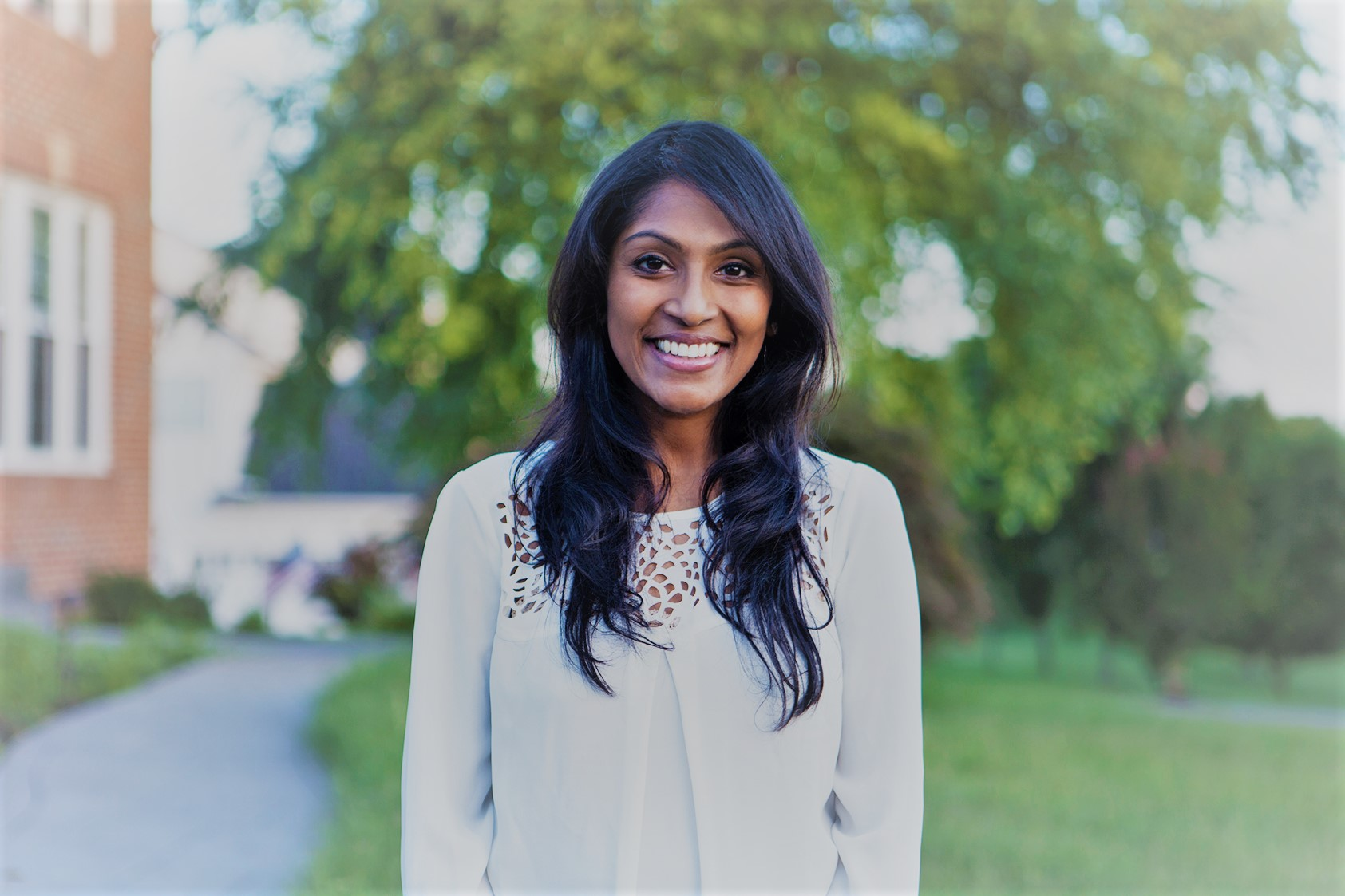
- Born: September 16, 1979 (age 47); Sri Lanka
- Education: Yale University (BS, JD); Magdalen College, Oxford (MPhil)
- Political party: Democratic
- Relatives: Thiru Vignarajah (brother)

Krishanti O'Mara Vignarajah (born September 16, 1979) is an American lawyer serving as President and CEO of Global Refuge. She previously served in the Obama White House as Policy Director for First Lady Michelle Obama and at the State Department as Senior Advisor under Secretary of State Hillary Clinton and Secretary of State John Kerry.

== Early life and education ==
Krishanti O'Mara Vignarajah is the second child of Tamil parents Elyathamby and Sothy Vignarajah. Vignarajah and her brother Thiru Vignarajah arrived in the United States as children because their parents fled the Sri Lankan Civil War. At Yale College she earned a B.S. in Molecular, Cellular and Developmental Biology, graduating magna cum laude and with Phi Beta Kappa honors; she also earned a Master's degree in Political Science. She was a 2002 Marshall Scholar at Magdalen College, Oxford, where she received an M.Phil. in International Relations. She returned to Yale Law School, where she served on the Yale Law Journal.

== Career ==
Back from college for a summer, Vignarajah worked for Senator Paul Sarbanes. She has practiced law at Jenner & Block in Washington, DC; she has clerked for Chief Judge Michael Boudin on the U.S. Court of Appeals for the First Circuit, and has taught at Georgetown University as an adjunct.

She was a Senior Advisor at the U. S. Department of State under both Secretary John Kerry and Secretary Hillary Clinton.

At the White House, Vignarajah served as Policy Director for Michelle Obama and led the First Lady’s signature Let Girls Learn initiative. At the State Department, she coordinated development and implementation of multiple programs including those concerning refugees and migration, engagement with religious communities, the legal dimensions of U.S. foreign policy, and regional issues relating to Africa and the Middle East. She worked closely with USAID, Health & Human Services and the Department of Defense.

Vignarajah ran for governor of Maryland in the 2018 primary election, finishing fourth. She gained "some national attention" because had she won, "she would have been the first woman, immigrant or person of color to be elected governor in the state".

In 2019, she became president and CEO of the Lutheran Immigration and Refugee Service. During her tenure there, the refugee resettlement agency filed litigation against the Trump administration, challenging the legality of Executive Order 13888, which seeks to give state and local officials the authority to opt out of refugee resettlement in their jurisdictions. In an interview with NPR, Vignarajah described the policy as "cruel and shortsighted," and noted that "refugees that have been waiting to be reunited with their families for years may be forced to settle hundreds of miles away." Vignarajah also spoke out against the Executive Order in a Baltimore Sun OpEd entitled, "The courts should declare Trump's refugee order unconstitutional." The lawsuit has thus far resulted in a preliminary injunction against the policy, barring its implementation temporarily. In response, Vignarajah told NBC News, "This injunction provides critical relief. Those who have been waiting for years to reunite with their families and friends will no longer have to choose between their loved ones and the resettlement services that are so critical in their first months as new Americans."

She has been recognized as one of The Daily Record’s “Top 100 Women,” “Most Admired CEOs,” the Hill’s Changemakers, WTCI’s “International Business Leaders,” and one of the Baltimore Sun’s Women to Watch.

== Personal life ==
Vignarajah is married to Collin O'Mara, president and CEO of the National Wildlife Federation. Their wedding was officiated by Senator Chris Coons of Delaware. They are the parents of two young daughters, Alana and Leya.

In June 2020, Vignarajah went public with her breast cancer diagnosis. In an interview with The Baltimore Sun, she said, "My hope is to do my part to lift some of the stigma and anxiety that sits around breast cancer."

== Selected publications ==
- "I work with refugees — and I’ve seen the human cost of Trump’s policy changes." MS NOW, November 10, 2025
- "From crisis to contribution: Why America needs refugees." The Baltimore Sun, June 25, 2024
- "Immigration is the demographic savior too many refuse to acknowledge." The Hill, May 15, 2024
- "Refugee children need Baltimore foster parents." The Baltimore Banner, February 13, 2024
- "Afghan evacuees are stuck in legal limbo. Here’s how to help them." The Washington Post, March 23, 2022
- "How business leaders can help meet the needs of Afghan refugees" USA Today, December 9, 2021
- "As the U.S. approaches withdrawal, our Afghan allies' lives must be prioritized" The Washington Post, June 6, 2021
- "Sohail Pardis was beheaded because the US didn't reward him for his service" CNN, July 28, 2021
- "Don't leave ICE out of police reform, brutality and racism in immigration enforcement" Houston Chronicle, July 3, 2020
- "How The U.S. Can Fix The 'Humanitarian Emergency' At The Border" NowThis News, April 8, 2021
- tronc (June 20, 2020). "On World Refugee Day, a shameful U.S. record to confront". New York Daily News.
- "USAID's mission is too important to politicize and obstruct" The Hill, November 15, 2020
- "Migrants in detention deserve dignity, sanitary conditions" The Atlanta Journal-Constitution, April 25, 2020
- "Massive detention facilities for migrant youth are failing" Miami Herald, May 28, 2019
- "Family separation of migrant children allowed U.S. government to 'traffic in kidnapping'" The Baltimore Sun, October 26, 2020
- "Welcoming refugees is a matter of faith, economics, and freedom" Houston Chronicle, January 13, 2020.
