= 2018 Maryland gubernatorial election =

- November 6, 2018
- Turnout: 59.06% ▲11.83%
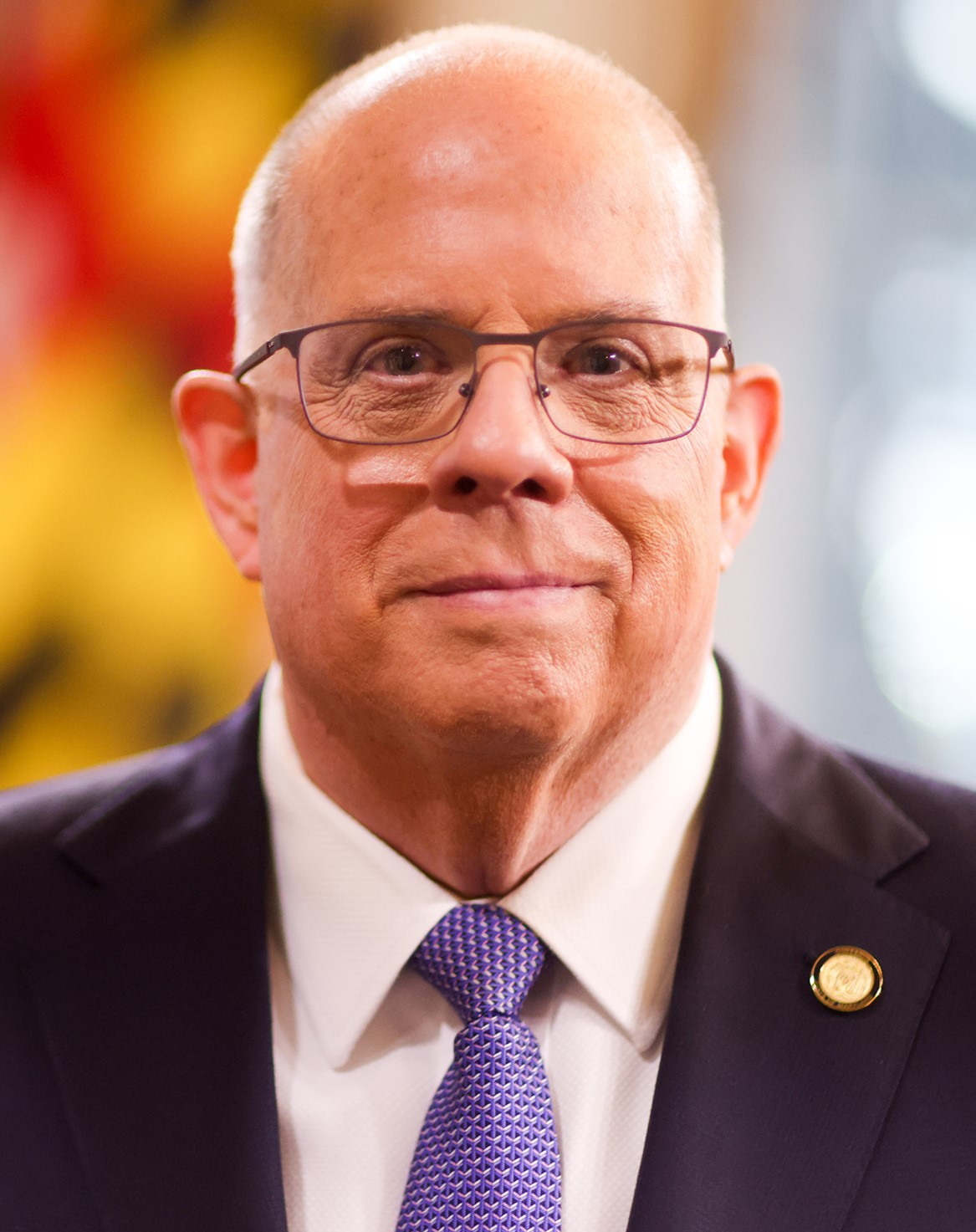

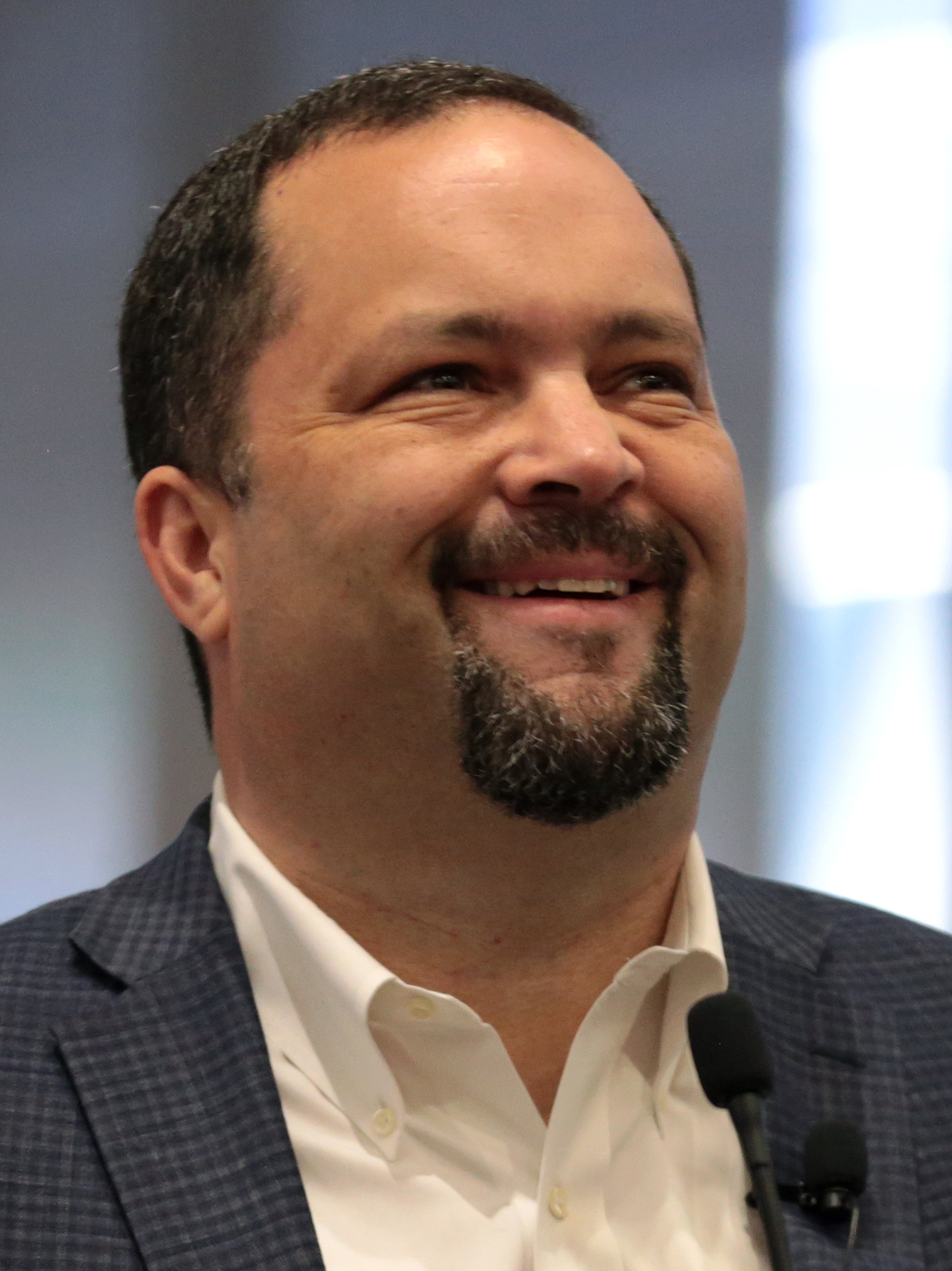
| Nominee | Larry Hogan | Ben Jealous |
| Party | Republican | Democratic |
| Running mate | Boyd Rutherford | Susan Turnbull |
| Popular vote | 1,275,644 | 1,002,639 |
| Percentage | 55.35% | 43.51% |
- Hogan: 40–50% 50–60% 60–70% 70–80% 80–90% >90% Jealous: 40–50% 50–60% 60–70% 70–80% 80–90% Tie: 40–50% 50% No data
Governor before election
Larry Hogan
Republican
Elected Governor
Larry Hogan
Republican

The 2018 Maryland gubernatorial election was held on November 6, 2018. The date included the election of the governor, lieutenant governor, and all members of the Maryland General Assembly. Popular incumbent Governor Larry Hogan and Lieutenant Governor Boyd Rutherford, both Republicans, were elected to a second term in a landslide against Democrat Ben Jealous, the former NAACP CEO, and his running mate Susan Turnbull. This was one of eight Republican-held governorships up for election in a state carried by Hillary Clinton in the 2016 presidential election.

Hogan became the second Republican governor of Maryland to win re-election, and the first since Theodore McKeldin in 1954. He also became the first Republican to win over 55% of the vote in a statewide election in Maryland since U.S. Senator Charles Mathias in 1980. This was the first election since 1974 in which Maryland simultaneously elected a gubernatorial nominee and a U.S. Senate nominee of opposite parties. This was the first and only Maryland gubernatorial election in which both major party candidates received over one million votes. As of 2025, this is the last time that a Republican won a statewide election in Maryland.

== Background ==
At the presidential level, Maryland is a staunchly Democratic state due to the large number of Democratic voters in the Washington metropolitan area and Baltimore City. Maryland had not seen a Republican presidential candidate win its votes since 1988, and the state had not been within 15% since 2004; Hillary Clinton won the state by 26 points over Donald Trump (60% to 34%) in 2016, Barack Obama defeated Mitt Romney by 26 points in 2012 (62% to 36%), and Obama defeated John McCain by 25 points in 2008 (62% to 37%).

Hogan was elected governor in 2014, defeating then-lieutenant governor Anthony Brown by a margin of 51% to 47%; the result was considered one of the biggest election upsets that year. Prior to Hogan's victory, Bob Ehrlich, elected in 2002, had been the only Republican elected as Governor of Maryland since Spiro Agnew. However, Ehrlich was defeated for reelection in 2006 by Martin O'Malley and defeated again in 2010, when he faced O'Malley in a rematch.

In April 2018, Hogan had a 68% approval rating, the second-highest approval of any governor in the country, only behind Governor Charlie Baker of Massachusetts, who had a 71% approval rating. Despite the state's Democratic leaning, Hogan had a high approval rating among all partisan groups (65% approval from Democrats, 64% of Independents, and 81% of Republicans).

== Republican primary ==
=== Candidates ===
==== Nominated ====
- Larry Hogan, incumbent governor

==== Declined ====
- Barry Glassman, Harford County Executive
- John Grasso, Anne Arundel County Councilman

=== Endorsements ===
Larry Hogan

Statewide officials

- Melvin Steinberg, former lieutenant governor of Maryland

State legislators

- Joe Bartenfelder, former House Deputy Majority Whip
- James Brochin, state senator
- Bill Cox, former House Deputy Majority Whip
- Steven J. DeBoy Sr., former delegate
- Dennis C. Donaldson, former speaker pro tempore of the House of Delegates
- Donna M. Felling, former delegate
- Rona E. Kramer, former senator
- Laurence Levitan, former senator
- Keiffer Mitchell Jr., former delegate, Baltimore City Councilman
- R. Clayton Mitchell Jr., former Speaker of the Maryland House of Delegates
- Paul Muldowney, former delegate
- Robert R. Neall, former senator
- George Owings, former House Majority Whip
- Richard Rynd, former delegate
- Jim Simpson, former Senate Finance Committee Chairman
- Casper R. Taylor Jr., former Speaker of the Maryland House of Delegates
- John F. Wood Jr., former delegate

Local officials

- Jimmy Aluisi, former Prince George's County sheriff
- Jud Ashman, Gaithersburg mayor
- Ron Bowers, former Washington County Commissioner
- Pat Buehler, former Calvert County Commissioner
- Charles Cephas, president of Hurlock Town Council
- Robert W. Curran, former Baltimore City Councilman
- Jake Day, Salisbury mayor
- Michael Estève, Bowie City Councilman
- Ron Fithian, chairman of the Clean Chesapeake Coalition and Kent County Commissioner
- Robert Flanigan, mayor of Frostburg
- Henri Gardner, Bowie City Councilman
- Jack Heath, Salisbury City Council President
- Michael Henry, mayor of Hurlock
- Elmer Horsey, former Chestertown mayor
- Jack Jenkins, former Bowie City Councilman
- George F. Johnson IV, former Anne Arundel County sheriff
- O. James Lighthizer, former Anne Arundel County Executive
- Jimmy Marcos, Bowie City Councilman
- Lewis Metzner, Hagerstown City Councilman
- John Miller, Middletown Burgess
- Doug Mullendore, Washington County sheriff
- Diane Polangin, former Bowie City Councilwoman
- Eileen M. Rehrmann, former Harford County Executive
- Wayne Ridenour, Washington County School Board member
- Fred Robinson, Bowie mayor
- Nick Scarpelli, former Cumberland City Councilman
- John Schnebly, former Hagerstown City Councilman
- Rikki Spector, former Baltimore City Councilwoman
- Ricky Travers, Dorchester County Council president
- Bruce Wahl, former Chesapeake Beach mayor, former president of the Maryland Municipal League
- Chad Weddle, Walkersville Burgess
- Gee Williams, mayor of Berlin
- Floyd Wilson, former Prince George's County Council chairman

Judges

- Michael Algeo, retired Maryland Circuit Court judge
- Alexander Williams Jr., retired federal judge

Individuals

- Todd Christie, businessman and brother of Chris Christie
- Charles Koch, businessman
- David Koch, businessman
- Nate Landow, former Maryland Democratic Party Chairman
- Scott Pastrick, former Treasurer of the Democratic National Committee and Officer of the Executive Committee
- Neal Simon, Independent U.S. Senate candidate

Organizations

- Maryland Fire Chiefs Association
- State Law Enforcement Officers Labor Alliance
- International Association of Firefighters
- Maryland Pipe Trades Association
- Steamfitters & Plumbers Local Union 486
- Steamfitters & Plumbers Local Union 489
- Fire Sprinkler Fitters Local Union 669
- Plumbers Local Union 5
- Steamfitters Local Union 602
- Laborers' International Union of North America
- United Association
- United Union of Roofers, Waterproofers and Allied Workers
- Ocean City Career Fire Fighters and Paramedics
- Worcester County Professional Fire Fighters
- Salisbury Career Fire Fighters
- Fraternal Order of Police
- Baltimore Fire Fighters Local 734
- Montgomery County Career Fire Fighters IAFF Local 1664
- Career Firefighters Association of Frederick Local 3666
- Maryland Building Industry Association
- National Association of Home Builders
- NAIOP the Commercial Real Estate Development Association
- Maryland Realtors
- Annapolis City Fraternal Order Of Police Lodge #1
- Anne Arundel County Fraternal Order Of Police Lodge #70
- St. Mary's County Fraternal Order Of Police Lodge #7
- Talbot County Fraternal Order Of Police Lodge #18
- Carroll County Fraternal Order Of Police Lodge #20
- Howard County Police Officers' Association – Fraternal Order of Police Lodge #21
- Cecil County Fraternal Order Of Police Lodge #2
- Greenspring Valley Fraternal Order Of Police Lodge #76
- Mount Rainier Fraternal Order of Police Lodge #85
- Prince George's County Professional Fire Fighters & Paramedics Association IAFF Local 1619
- National Federation of Independent Business

Newspapers

- The Baltimore Sun
- The Capital
- The Daily Times
- Washington Jewish Week
- The Washington Post

=== Results ===
Republican primary results
| Party | Candidate | Votes | % |
|---|---|---|---|
| Republican | Larry Hogan (incumbent) | 210,935 | 100.00% |
| Total votes | | 210,935 | 100.00% |

== Democratic primary ==
=== Candidates ===
==== Nominated ====
- Ben Jealous, former president and CEO of the NAACP
  - Running mate: Susie Turnbull, former chair of the Maryland Democratic Party and former vice chair of the Democratic National Committee

==== Eliminated in primary ====
- Rushern Baker, Prince George's County executive
  - Running mate: Elizabeth Embry, former Maryland Attorney General Crime Division Chief and candidate for mayor of Baltimore in 2016
- Ralph Jaffe, perennial candidate
  - Running mate: Freda Jaffe, sister of Ralph Jaffe
- James Jones II
  - Running mate: Charles Waters
- Richard Madaleno, State Senator
  - Running mate: Luwanda Jenkins, businesswoman and former Maryland Special Secretary for Minority Affairs
- Alec Ross, author and former State Department official
  - Running mate: Julie Verratti, co-founder of Denziens Brewing Co, former senior advisor at the Small Business Administration, and LGBT political activist.
- Jim Shea, attorney
  - Running mate: Brandon Scott, Baltimore City Councilmember
- Krish O'Mara Vignarajah, former policy director to former First Lady Michelle Obama and former State Department official
  - Running mate: Sharon Blake, former president of the Baltimore Teachers Union

==== Deceased ====
- Kevin Kamenetz, Baltimore County Executive (deceased May 10, 2018)
  - Running mate: Valerie Ervin, senior advisor to the Working Families Party and former Montgomery County Councilmember
  - (Because of Kamenetz' death, Valerie Ervin became a candidate for governor. See under "Withdrew" heading for more information.)

==== Withdrew ====
- Maya Rockeymoore Cummings, policy consultant and wife of U.S. Representative Elijah Cummings
- Valerie Ervin, former senior advisor to the Working Families Party and former Montgomery County Councilmember
  - Running mate: Marisol Johnson, former vice chair of the Baltimore County Board of Education and small businesswoman
  - (Valerie Ervin, who had been the running mate of Kevin Kamenetz before he died on May 10, became a candidate for governor with Marisol Johnson as running mate on May 17. This came too late to change the primary ballot, so notices were posted at polling places informing voters that votes for Kamenetz and Ervin would be counted as votes for Ervin and Johnson. On June 12, Ervin withdrew from the race.)

==== Declined ====
- John Delaney, U.S. Representative (ran for President in 2020,)
- Peter Franchot, State Comptroller
- Brian Frosh, attorney general
- Doug Gansler, former attorney general and candidate for governor in 2014
- Ike Leggett, Montgomery County executive
- Maggie McIntosh, state delegate
- Heather Mizeur, former state delegate and candidate for governor in 2014
- Joseline Peña-Melnyk, state delegate and candidate for MD-04 in 2016
- Thomas Perez, chair of the Democratic National Committee, former United States Secretary of Labor, and former Maryland Secretary of Labor
- Stephanie Rawlings-Blake, former mayor of Baltimore
- David Trone, businessman and candidate for MD-08 in 2016 (running for MD-06)
- Kenneth Ulman, former Howard County executive and nominee for lieutenant governor in 2014

=== Endorsements ===
Rushern Baker

U.S. senators

- Chris Van Hollen, U.S. senator (D-MD)

Statewide officials

- Brian Frosh, attorney general
- Parris Glendening, former governor
- Martin O'Malley, former governor

State legislators

- Joanne C. Benson, state senator (Prince George's County)
- Ulysses Currie, state senator (Prince George's County)
- Thomas V. Mike Miller, state senator
- Douglas J. J. Peters, state senator (Prince George's County) and Senate Majority Leader
- Paul G. Pinsky, state senator (Prince George's County)

Individuals

- Valerie Ervin, senior adviser to the Working Families Party and former gubernatorial candidate
- David Trone, businessman

Newspapers and magazines

- The Washington Post
Valerie Ervin (withdrew)

U.S. representatives

- Donna Edwards, former U.S. representative (D-MD)
Ben Jealous

Newspapers and magazines

- The Baltimore Sun

U.S. executive branch officials

- Joe Biden, 47th vice president of the United States
- Barack Obama, 44th president of the United States

U.S. senators

- Cory Booker, U.S. senator (D-NJ)
- Ben Cardin, U.S. senator (D-MD)
- Kirsten Gillibrand, U.S. senator (D-NY)
- Kamala Harris, U.S. Senator (D-CA)
- Bernie Sanders, U.S. senator (I-VT)
- Elizabeth Warren, U.S. senator (D-MA)

U.S. representatives

- Elijah Cummings, U.S. representative, MD
- Ro Khanna, U.S. representative, CA
- John Sarbanes, U.S. representative, MD

Individuals

- Rea Carey, executive director of the National LGBTQ Task Force Action Fund
- Dave Chappelle, comedian and social commentator
- Rosario Dawson, actress and activist
- Bill de Blasio, mayor of New York City
- Eric Garcetti, mayor of Los Angeles, CA
- Eric Holder, former US Attorney General
- Van Jones, commentator and activist
- Ana Kasparian, commentator on The Young Turks
- Nomiki Konst, correspondent for The Young Turks
- John Leguizamo, actor
- Harry J. Lennix, actor, writer, director, activist
- Terry McAuliffe, former Governor of Virginia
- Bill McKibben, environmentalist, author, journalist, leader of 350.org
- Alyssa Milano, actress and activist
- Phil Radford, environmentalist and former executive director of Greenpeace
- Jane O'Meara Sanders, social worker and political aide
- Nina Turner, former Ohio state senator, president of Our Revolution
- Steve Westly, former California State Controller

State legislators

- Bilal Ali, state delegate (Baltimore City)
- Talmadge Branch, state delegate (Baltimore City)
- Eric Ebersole, state delegate (Baltimore & Howard Cos.)
- Guy Guzzone, state senator (Howard County)
- Cheryl Kagan, state senator (Montgomery County)
- Marc Korman, state delegate (Montgomery County)
- Clarence Lam, state delegate (Baltimore & Howard Cos.)
- Shirley Nathan-Pulliam, state senator (Baltimore County)
- Shane Robinson, state delegate (Montgomery County)
- Samuel I. Rosenberg, state delegate (Baltimore City)
- Charles Sydnor, state delegate (Baltimore County)
- Jimmy Tarlau, state delegate (Prince George's County)
- Mary L. Washington, state senator (Baltimore City)
- Jheanelle Wilkins, state delegate (Montgomery County)
- Pat Young, state delegate (Baltimore County)

Local officials

- Vicki Almond, Baltimore County Councilwoman
- Kristerfer Burnett, Baltimore City Councilman
- Edward Burroughs, Prince George's County Board of Education member
- Zeke Cohen, Baltimore City Councilman
- Eric Costello, Baltimore City Councilman
- Ryan Dorsey, Baltimore City Councilman
- Jessica Fitzwater, Frederick County Councilmember
- Bill Henry, Baltimore City Councilman
- Ike Leggett, Montgomery County Executive
- Sharon Middleton, Baltimore City Councilwoman
- Don Mohler, Baltimore County Executive
- Catherine Pugh, mayor of Baltimore City
- Edward Reisinger, Baltimore City Councilman
- Brandon Scott, Baltimore City Councilman, candidate for lt. governor
- Shannon Sneed, Baltimore City Councilwoman
- Robert Stokes, Baltimore City Councilman

Organizations

- 350.org
- African American Coalition of Howard County
- Amalgamated Transit Union International (ATU)
- American Postal Workers Union
- Blue America
- CASA in Action
- Communication Workers of America
- Democracy for America
- The Digital Left
- District of Columbia Nurses Association
- Friends of the Earth Action
- Frostburg State College Democrats
- Greater Accokeek Progressive Activists
- Justice Democrats
- Lower Shore Progressive Caucus
- Maryland State Educators Association
- National Capital Baptist Convention
- National Nurses United
- Our Revolution
- The People For Bernie Sanders
- People's Action
- Progressive Maryland
- Progressive Neighbors
- The Sanders Institute
- Service Employees International Union
- Southwest Baltimore County Democratic Club
- Talbot Rising
- UNITE HERE
- United Food and Commercial Workers (UFCW)
- Working Families Party
Kevin Kamenetz (deceased)

U.S. representatives

- Dutch Ruppersberger, U.S. representative (D-MD)

State legislators

- Ben Brooks, state delegate (Baltimore County)
- Eric Ebersole, state delegate (Baltimore and Howard Cos.)
- Dan K. Morhaim, state delegate (Baltimore County)
- Shirley Nathan-Pulliam, state senator (Baltimore County)
- Dana Stein, state delegate (Baltimore County)
- Charles E. Sydnor III, state delegate (Baltimore County)
- Pat Young, state delegate (Baltimore County)

Local officials

- Cathy Bevins, member of the Baltimore County Council
- Julian E. Jones Jr., member of the Baltimore County Council

Individuals

- Peter Angelos, lawyer and majority owner of the Baltimore Orioles
Rich Madaleno

U.S. representatives

- Jamie Raskin, U.S. representative (D-MD)

Attorneys general

- Doug Gansler, former attorney general of Maryland

State senators

- Susan Lee, state senator
- Will Smith, state senator

State delegates

- Al Carr, state delegate
- Bonnie Cullison, state delegate
- Jim Gilchrist, state delegate
- Sheila Hixson, state delegate
- Anne Kaiser, state delegate
- Eric Luedtke, state delegate
- David Moon, state delegate
- Marice Morales, state delegate
- Ana Sol-Gutierrez, state delegate
- Jeff Waldstreicher, state delegate
- Karen Young, state delegate

Local officials

- Pat Baptiste, former Village of Chevy Chase mayor and former Montgomery County Planning Board member
- Linna Barnes, former Chevy Chase mayor
- Peter Benjamin, Garrett Park mayor
- Shirley Brandman, former Montgomery County Board of Education member
- Pat Burda, former Chevy Chase mayor
- Mary Flynn, Chevy Chase mayor
- Scott Fosler, Chevy Chase Councilmember and former Montgomery County Councilmember and former Chevy Chase mayor
- Lance Hoffman, former Chevy Chase Councilmember
- David Lublin, former mayor of Chevy Chase
- Barney Rush, Chevy Chase Councilmember
- Kathy Strom, former Chevy Chase mayor
- Vicky Taplin, former Chevy Chase Councilmember
- Chris Trumbauer, Anne Arundel County Councilmember
- Meredith Wellington, former Montgomery County Planning Board member

Organizations

- BWLDC LiUNA
- Gay & Lesbian Victory Fund
- Montgomery County Green Democrats

Individuals

- Joe Flacco, quarterback for the Baltimore Ravens
Alec Ross

Individuals

- James Murdoch, businessman
- Robert Rubin, former United States Secretary of the Treasury
- Eric Schmidt, businessman
Jim Shea

Elected officials

- Karl Racine, attorney general, Washington DC

State delegates

- Antonio Hayes, state delegate
- Cory McCray, state delegate

Local officials

- John Bullock, member of Baltimore City Council
- Kristerfer Burnett, member of Baltimore City Council
- Brandon Scott, member of Baltimore City Council
- Shannon Sneed, member of Baltimore City Council
Krish Vignarajah

Individuals

- Robin Chase, businesswoman
- Ashley Judd, actress
- Federica Marchionni, businesswoman

Organizations

- Asian American Democratic Club of Montgomery County
- Columbia Democratic Club
- Moms Demand Action for Gun Sense in America
- Muslim Democratic Club of Montgomery County

=== Polling ===
| Poll source | Date(s) administered | Sample size | Margin of error | Rushern Baker | Valerie Ervin | Ben Jealous | Kevin Kamenetz | Richard Madaleno | Jim Shea | Krish Vignarajah | Other | Undecided |
|---|---|---|---|---|---|---|---|---|---|---|---|---|
| Gonzales Research | June 4–10, 2018 | 505 | ± 4.5% | 25% | 7% | 23% | – | 9% | 6% | 5% | 2% (Note: Alec Ross with 2%, Ralph Jaffe and James Jones with <1%) | 22% |
| OpinionWorks | May 29 – June 6, 2018 | 500 | ± 4.4% | 16% | 5% | 16% | – | 4% | 4% | 4% | 7% (Note: Alec Ross with 1%, someone else with 6%) | 44% |
| University of Maryland | May 29 – June 3, 2018 | 532 | ± 6.0% | 16% | 8% | 21% | – | 6% | 4% | 4% | 2% (Note: Alec Ross with 2%) | 39% |
| Mason-Dixon | February 20–24, 2018 | 500 | ± 4.5% | 26% | – | 14% | 15% | 4% | 3% | 2% | 3% (Note: Alec Ross with 2%, Ralph Jaffe 1%) | 32% |
| Goucher College | February 12–18, 2018 | 409 | ± 4.8% | 19% | – | 10% | 12% | 2% | 2% | 2% | 6% | 47% |
| Gonzales Research | December 27, 2017 – January 5, 2018 | 501 | ± 4.5% | 24% | – | 14% | 14% | 5% | 1% | 2% | 8% (Note: Maya Rockeymoore 6%, Alec Ross with 1%, Ralph Jaffe with 0%) | 33% |
| Mason-Dixon | September 27–30, 2017 | 400 | ± 5.0% | 28% | – | 10% | 11% | 3% | <1% | 1% | 1% (Note: Alec Ross with 1%</) | 46% |
| Goucher College | September 14–18, 2017 | 324 | ± 5.4% | 13% | – | 6% | 8% | 2% | 2% | 1% | 22% (Note: Doug Gansler 11%, Maya Rockeymoore 8%, Alec Ross with 1%. Other 2%) | 44% |

=== Results ===
Results by county: Jealous—40–50% Jealous—30–40% Baker—30–40% Baker—40–50%

Democratic primary results
| Party | Candidate | Votes | % |
|---|---|---|---|
| Democratic | Ben Jealous | 231,895 | 39.6% |
| Democratic | Rushern Baker | 171,696 | 29.3% |
| Democratic | Jim Shea | 48,647 | 8.3% |
| Democratic | Krish O'Mara Vignarajah | 48,041 | 8.2% |
| Democratic | Richard Madaleno | 34,184 | 5.8% |
| Democratic | Kevin Kamenetz/Valerie Ervin | 18,851 | 3.2% |
| Democratic | Alec Ross | 13,780 | 2.4% |
| Democratic | Ralph Jaffe | 9,405 | 1.6% |
| Democratic | James Jones | 9,188 | 1.6% |
| Total votes | | 585,687 | 100.0% |

== Green nomination ==
=== Candidates ===
==== Declared ====
- Ian Schlakman, entrepreneur and former co-chair of the Maryland Green Party
  - Running mate: Annie Chambers, reverend and Baltimore City Resident Advisory Board member

=== Results ===
Following the Maryland Green Party's nominating procedure, the delegates of the Coordinating Council, which is the party's State Central Committee, made the decision to nominate the gubernatorial ticket as no other candidate had filed by the party's March 30, 2018, deadline. More than one ticket seeking the nomination would have required the party to conduct a primary, an obligation not mandated by the State Board of Elections for non-principal parties.

Green State Central Committee Designation April 20 – April 25
| Candidate | Delegates in favor | Delegates against | Delegates not voting |
|---|---|---|---|
| Ian Schlakman / Annie Chambers | 15 | 0 | 5 |

== Libertarian convention ==
=== Candidates ===
==== Declared ====
- Shawn Quinn, nominee for governor in 2014 and nominee for the House of Delegates in 2010
  - Running mate: Christina Smith

| Candidate | Votes in favor | Votes against | Not voting |
|---|---|---|---|
| Shawn Quinn / Christina Smith | 32 | 1 | 0 |

== General election ==
=== Debates ===
Larry Hogan and Ben Jealous met for their one and only scheduled debate on September 24. The debate was livestreamed in the evening by the Maryland Public Television.

=== Predictions ===
| Source | Ranking | As of |
|---|---|---|
| The Cook Political Report | Likely R | October 26, 2018 |
| The Washington Post | Likely R | November 5, 2018 |
| FiveThirtyEight | Safe R | November 5, 2018 |
| Rothenberg Political Report | Likely R | November 1, 2018 |
| Sabato's Crystal Ball | Likely R | November 5, 2018 |
| RealClearPolitics | Likely R | November 4, 2018 |
| Daily Kos | Likely R | November 5, 2018 |
| Fox News (Note: The Fox News Midterm Power Rankings uniquely does not contain a category for Safe/Solid races) | Likely R | November 5, 2018 |
| Politico | Likely R | November 5, 2018 |
| Governing | Likely R | November 5, 2018 |

=== Polling ===
View source data.

| Poll source | Date(s) administered | Sample size | Margin of error | Larry Hogan (R) | Ben Jealous (D) | Other | Undecided |
|---|---|---|---|---|---|---|---|
| University of Maryland | October 4–7, 2018 | 648 LV | ± 4.5% | 58% | 38% | 0% | 3% |
| University of Maryland | October 4–7, 2018 | 814 RV | ± 4.0% | 56% | 36% | 0% | 2% |
| Gonzales Research | October 1–6, 2018 | 806 | ± 3.5% | 54% | 36% | 2% (Note: Shawn Quinn (L) and Ian Schlakman (G) with 1%) | 9% |
| Mason-Dixon | September 24–26, 2018 | 625 | ± 4.0% | 52% | 37% | 2% | 9% |
| Goucher College | September 11–16, 2018 | 472 | ± 4.5% | 54% | 32% | 2% | 9% |
| Gonzales Research | August 1–8, 2018 | 831 | ± 3.5% | 52% | 36% | 1% (Note: Shawn Quinn (L) with 1%, Ian Schlakman (G) with 0%) | 11% |
| Garin-Hart-Yang (D-Jealous) | July 10–14, 2018 | 601 | ± 4.0% | 49% | 40% | – | 11% |
| Gonzales Research | June 4–10, 2018 | 800 | ± 3.5% | 51% | 34% | – | 14% |
| University of Maryland | May 29 – June 3, 2018 | 968 | ± 4.5% | 51% | 39% | – | 10% |
| Goucher College | April 14–19, 2018 | 617 | ± 3.9% | 44% | 31% | – | 22% |
| Mason-Dixon | February 20–22, 2018 | 625 | ± 4.0% | 50% | 33% | – | 17% |
| Gonzales Research | December 27, 2017 – January 5, 2018 | 823 | ± 3.5% | 49% | 36% | – | 15% |
| Mason-Dixon | September 27–30, 2017 | 625 | ± 4.0% | 49% | 33% | – | 18% |

Notes

Hypothetical polling

with Rushern Baker

| Poll source | Date(s) administered | Sample size | Margin of error | Larry Hogan (R) | Rushern Baker (D) | Undecided |
|---|---|---|---|---|---|---|
| Gonzales Research | June 4–10, 2018 | 800 | ± 3.5% | 48% | 37% | 15% |
| University of Maryland | May 29 – June 3, 2018 | 968 | ± 4.5% | 51% | 39% | 9% |
| Goucher College | April 14–19, 2018 | 617 | ± 3.9% | 44% | 31% | 22% |
| Burton Research & Strategies (R) | March 4–11, 2018 | 600 | ± 4.0% | 54% | 29% | 15% |
| Mason-Dixon | February 20–22, 2018 | 625 | ± 4.0% | 51% | 36% | 13% |
| Gonzales Research | December 27, 2017 – January 5, 2018 | 823 | ± 3.5% | 47% | 37% | 16% |
| Mason-Dixon | September 27–30, 2017 | 625 | ± 4.0% | 46% | 39% | 15% |

with Richard Madaleno

| Poll source | Date(s) administered | Sample size | Margin of error | Larry Hogan (R) | Richard Madaleno (D) | Undecided |
|---|---|---|---|---|---|---|
| Gonzales Research | June 4–10, 2018 | 800 | ± 3.5% | 50% | 36% | 14% |
| University of Maryland | May 29 – June 3, 2018 | 465–497 | ± 6.0–6.5% | 50% | 40% | 10% |
| Goucher College | April 14–19, 2018 | 617 | ± 3.9% | 45% | 27% | 26% |
| Mason-Dixon | September 27–30, 2017 | 625 | ± 4.0% | 49% | 30% | 21% |

with Alec Ross

| Poll source | Date(s) administered | Sample size | Margin of error | Larry Hogan (R) | Alec Ross (D) | Undecided |
|---|---|---|---|---|---|---|
| University of Maryland | May 29 – June 3, 2018 | 465–497 | ± 6.0–6.5% | 55% | 31% | 13% |
| Goucher College | April 14–19, 2018 | 617 | ± 3.9% | 46% | 26% | 26% |

with Jim Shea

| Poll source | Date(s) administered | Sample size | Margin of error | Larry Hogan (R) | Jim Shea (D) | Undecided |
|---|---|---|---|---|---|---|
| University of Maryland | May 29 – June 3, 2018 | 465–497 | ± 6.0–6.5% | 53% | 35% | 13% |
| Goucher College | April 14–19, 2018 | 617 | ± 3.9% | 47% | 27% | 25% |

with Krish Vignarajah

| Poll source | Date(s) administered | Sample size | Margin of error | Larry Hogan (R) | Krish Vignarajah (D) | Undecided |
|---|---|---|---|---|---|---|
| University of Maryland | May 29 – June 3, 2018 | 465–497 | ± 6.0–6.5% | 54% | 35% | 11% |
| Goucher College | April 14–19, 2018 | 617 | ± 3.9% | 45% | 25% | 27% |

| Poll source | Date(s) administered | Sample size | Margin of error | Larry Hogan (R) | Generic Democrat | Other | Undecided |
|---|---|---|---|---|---|---|---|
| Goucher College | February 12–17, 2018 | 658 | ± 3.8% | 47% | 43% | – | 10% |
| GBA Strategies (D) | November 14–18, 2017 | 600 | ± 4.0% | 45% | 35% | – | – |
| OpinionWorks | October 25 – November 7, 2017 | 850 | ± 3.3% | 43% | 28% | 4% | 24% |
| Washington Post/University of Maryland | March 19–22, 2017 | 914 | ± 4.0% | 39% | 36% | 3% | 22% |
| Washington Post/University of Maryland | March 16–19, 2017 | 914 | ± 4.0% | 41% | 37% | 2% | 20% |

with Valerie Ervin

| Poll source | Date(s) administered | Sample size | Margin of error | Larry Hogan (R) | Valerie Ervin (D) | Undecided |
|---|---|---|---|---|---|---|
| University of Maryland | May 29 – June 3, 2018 | 465–497 | ± 6.0–6.5% | 51% | 38% | 11% |

with Kevin Kamenetz

| Poll source | Date(s) administered | Sample size | Margin of error | Larry Hogan (R) | Kevin Kamenetz (D) | Undecided |
|---|---|---|---|---|---|---|
| Goucher College | April 14–19, 2018 | 617 | ± 3.9% | 45% | 28% | 23% |
| Burton Research & Strategies (R) | March 4–11, 2018 | 600 | ± 4.0% | 57% | 26% | 15% |
| Mason-Dixon | February 20–22, 2018 | 625 | ± 4.0% | 49% | 34% | 17% |
| Gonzales Research | December 27, 2017 – January 5, 2018 | 823 | ± 3.5% | 48% | 34% | 18% |
| Mason-Dixon | September 27–30, 2017 | 625 | ± 4.0% | 48% | 35% | 17% |

with John Delaney

| Poll source | Date(s) administered | Sample size | Margin of error | Larry Hogan (R) | John Delaney (D) | Undecided |
|---|---|---|---|---|---|---|
| Public Policy Polling | April 15–17, 2016 | 879 | ± 3.3% | 48% | 29% | 24% |

with Tom Perez

| Poll source | Date(s) administered | Sample size | Margin of error | Larry Hogan (R) | Tom Perez (D) | Undecided |
|---|---|---|---|---|---|---|
| Public Policy Polling | April 15–17, 2016 | 879 | ± 3.3% | 48% | 24% | 28% |

=== Results ===

Maryland gubernatorial election, 2018
| Party | Candidate | Votes | % | ±% |
|---|---|---|---|---|
| Republican | Larry Hogan (incumbent) | 1,275,644 | 55.35% | +4.32% |
| Democratic | Ben Jealous | 1,002,639 | 43.51% | −3.74% |
| Libertarian | Shawn Quinn | 13,241 | 0.57% | −0.89% |
| Green | Ian Schlakman | 11,175 | 0.48% | N/A |
| Write-in | | 1,813 | 0.08% | -0.18% |
| Total votes | | 2,304,512 | 100.00% | N/A |
| Republican hold | | | | |

==== By county ====
By county

| County | Ben Jealous Democratic | | Larry Hogan Republican | | Others | |
| County | # | % | # | % | # | % |
|---|---|---|---|---|---|---|
| Allegany | 3,985 | 16.9% | 19,224 | 81.7% | 321 | 1.4% |
| Anne Arundel | 69,399 | 30.3% | 157,202 | 68.6% | 2,605 | 1.2% |
| Baltimore | 122,773 | 37.9% | 198,122 | 61.1% | 3,381 | 1.1% |
| Baltimore City | 123,609 | 66.9% | 58,360 | 31.6% | 2,722 | 1.5% |
| Calvert | 9,216 | 23.5% | 29,610 | 75.4% | 458 | 1.2% |
| Caroline | 1,900 | 16.5% | 9,489 | 82.5% | 116 | 1.0% |
| Carroll | 11,767 | 15.7% | 62,445 | 83.2% | 839 | 1.1% |
| Cecil | 7,354 | 21.0% | 27,063 | 77.5% | 522 | 1.4% |
| Charles | 32,100 | 49.9% | 31,756 | 49.3% | 504 | 0.8% |
| Dorchester | 3,043 | 24.6% | 9,205 | 74.4% | 119 | 1.0% |
| Frederick | 33,355 | 31.1% | 72,560 | 67.7% | 1,304 | 1.3% |
| Garrett | 1,395 | 12.7% | 9,472 | 86.0% | 141 | 1.3% |
| Harford | 24,012 | 21.7% | 85,259 | 77.1% | 1,308 | 1.2% |
| Howard | 61,146 | 42.6% | 80,754 | 56.2% | 1,663 | 1.2% |
| Kent | 2,222 | 25.6% | 6,370 | 73.3% | 102 | 1.2% |
| Montgomery | 224,029 | 54.9% | 180,018 | 44.1% | 4,381 | 1.1% |
| Prince George's | 225,889 | 70.8% | 89,925 | 28.2% | 3,171 | 1.0% |
| Queen Anne's | 3,268 | 14.2% | 19,503 | 84.9% | 200 | 0.9% |
| Somerset | 2,379 | 30.9% | 5,203 | 67.6% | 120 | 1.5% |
| St. Mary's | 9,084 | 22.5% | 30,703 | 76.0% | 607 | 1.5% |
| Talbot | 3,957 | 21.8% | 14,081 | 77.4% | 152 | 0.8% |
| Washington | 10,894 | 21.6% | 38,765 | 76.8% | 802 | 1.6% |
| Wicomico | 10,426 | 31.1% | 22,659 | 67.6% | 449 | 1.3% |
| Worcester | 5,437 | 22.9% | 18,076 | 76.1% | 242 | 1.0% |
| Totals | 1,002,639 | 43.5% | 1,275,644 | 55.4% | 26,229 | 1.1% |

==== By congressional district ====
Hogan carried six of eight congressional districts, including five held by Democrats. This included the district of then-House Minority Whip Steny Hoyer, whom Hogan was defeated by in 1992.

| District | Larry Hogan | Ben Jealous | Elected Representative |
|---|---|---|---|
| 1st | 79% | 20% | Andy Harris |
| 2nd | 56% | 43% | Dutch Ruppersberger |
| 3rd | 56% | 43% | John Sarbanes |
| 4th | 40% | 59% | Anthony Brown |
| 5th | 52% | 47% | Steny Hoyer |
| 6th | 59% | 39% | David Trone |
| 7th | 44% | 55% | Elijah Cummings |
| 8th | 53% | 46% | Jamie Raskin |

== See also ==
- Governor of Maryland
- List of governors of Maryland
- Maryland gubernatorial elections
- Primary elections in Maryland
- Maryland elections
- 2014 Maryland gubernatorial election
- 2018 Maryland House of Delegates election
- 2018 Maryland Senate election
- Maryland Senate
- Maryland House of Delegates
