= Thiruvendran Vignarajah =

American politician and lawyer

Thiru Vignarajah
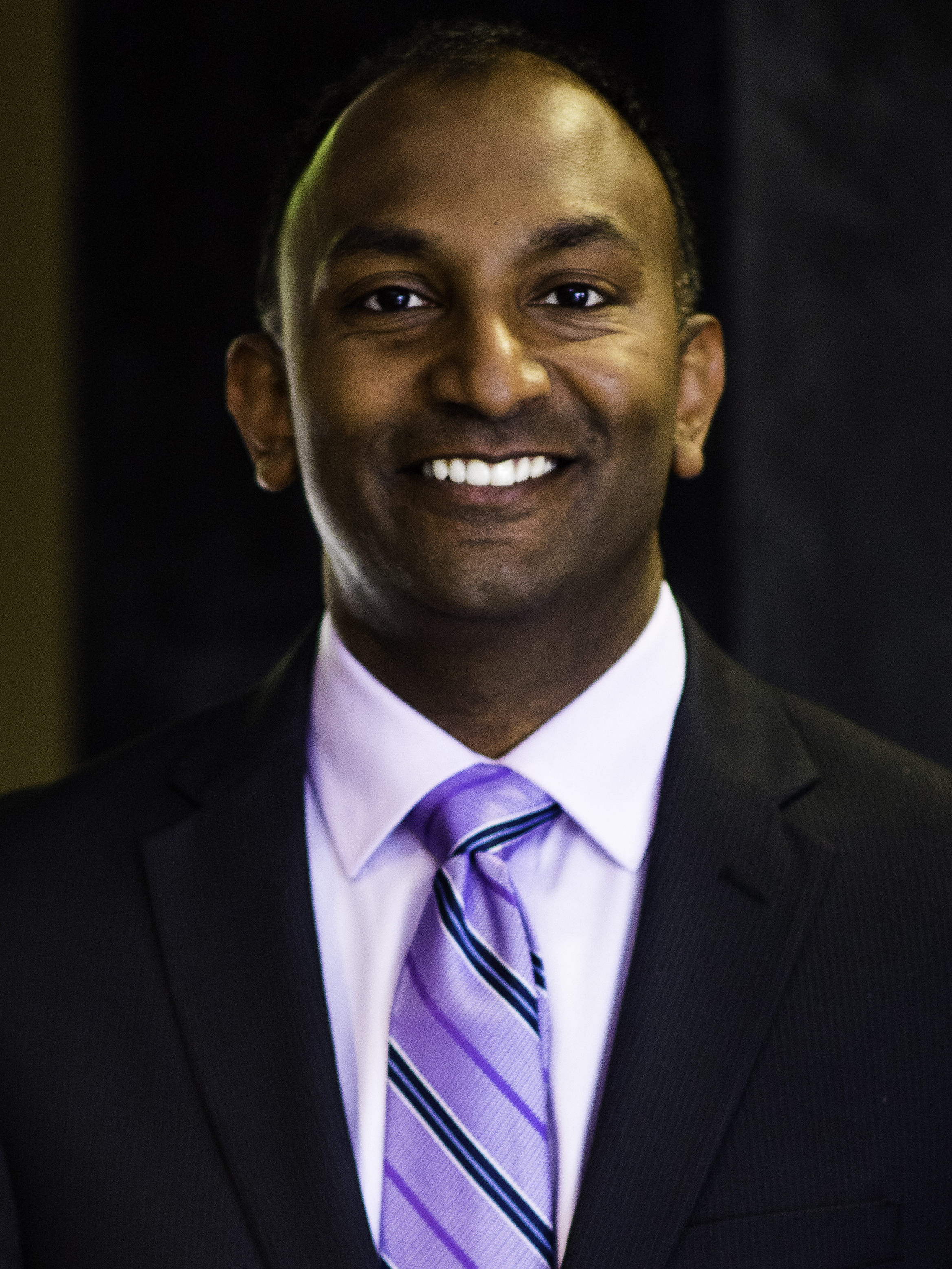

Personal details
- Born: December 18, 1976 (age 49)
- Party: Democratic
- Relatives: Krish O'Mara Vignarajah (sister)
- Education: Yale University (BA); King's College London (MA); Harvard University (JD)

Thiruvendran "Thiru" Vignarajah (born December 18, 1976) is an American lawyer and politician. He previously was Deputy Attorney General of Maryland. He is a litigation partner at the law firm DLA Piper in Baltimore. He has also been the lead attorney for the State of Maryland in the post-conviction appeals of Adnan Syed, who was convicted of murder in the high-profile 1999 killing of Hae Min Lee. He is a four-time candidate for Baltimore State's Attorney and mayor of Baltimore, having run for both positions twice and being defeated in the primary each time.

== Education ==
Vignarajah, the son of immigrants from Sri Lanka, graduated from Woodlawn High School in Baltimore County, Maryland. His sister is Krish O'Mara Vignarajah, now president and CEO of Lutheran Immigration Services. He studied at Yale College where he received degrees in Political Science and Philosophy, before earning a master's degree in Medical Ethics at King's College London. He then joined the consulting firm McKinsey & Company before attending Harvard Law School. He was elected President of the Harvard Law Review and was responsible for leading a push for addressing the gender disparity in law review admissions. While at Harvard, Vignarajah was also a research assistant for Derek Bok, the former President of Harvard University, and Arthur R. Miller.

== Legal career ==
After law school, Vignarajah clerked for Judge Guido Calabresi, a federal appellate judge on the Second Circuit Court of Appeals, and for Justice Stephen Breyer of the Supreme Court of the United States from 2006 to 2007. Following his clerkships, Vignarajah practiced at Arnold & Porter in Washington, D.C., before serving as an Assistant United States Attorney for the District of Maryland, under Rod J. Rosenstein, and then as Chief of the Major Investigations Unit at the State's Attorney's Office for Baltimore City. In 2015, Vignarajah was named Deputy Attorney General for the State of Maryland.

As Deputy Attorney General, Vignarajah was the lead author of statewide guidelines issued by the Maryland Attorney General to end discriminatory profiling by police, making Maryland the first state to answer former Attorney General Eric Holder's call for states to issue guidelines on profiling.

As a prosecutor, Vignarajah handled a number of notable cases in Maryland. He was responsible for prosecuting, among others, the alleged mastermind of a series of armed robberies that resulted in the murder of a Greek businessman in Baltimore; a former nonprofit board director who allegedly set a row home on fire with his mistress and her five-year-old son sleeping inside; and two alleged members of the Black Guerrilla Family who killed a 12-year-old boy and shot three other teenagers.

Vignarajah has taught constitutional law, administrative law, and law and education as a member of the adjunct faculty at the University of Baltimore School of Law and the University of Maryland School of Law. He also teaches a course on crime policy at Johns Hopkins University.

=== Killing of Hae Min Lee ===
The first season of the podcast Serial focused attention on the 1999 killing of Baltimore teen Hae Min Lee. A high school classmate, Adnan Syed, was convicted of her murder in 2000. Vignarajah has handled multiple appeals filed by Syed's legal team. On March 29, 2018, Maryland's Court of Special Appeals upheld a ruling that Syed was entitled to a new trial. On May 14, 2018, Vignarajah appealed the ruling. On March 8, 2019, Maryland's Court of Appeals overturned the ruling and reinstated Syed's original conviction.

=== Recorded sharing of nonpublic information ===
While serving as Deputy Attorney General of Maryland, Vignarajah was covertly filmed by conservative political activist James O'Keefe for his organization, Project Veritas. Vignarajah was filmed in a hotel room giving a female Project Veritas reporter information about plans to side with the Environmental Protection Agency against Maryland Governor Hogan. The plan had not yet been announced to the public. A spokesperson for Maryland Attorney General Brian Frosh said that “No protected or confidential information was revealed in any discussions." Ivan Bates, who at the time was running against Vignarajah, said that Vignarajah was "relaying this sensitive material to impress this young lady."

=== Hostile work environment ===
In an interview in May 2020, seven attorneys who worked under Vignarajah alleged that "he was a controlling and unreasonably demanding boss, one who would surround himself with young lawyers and press them to work all night and take his phone calls after-hours". In July 2022, Vignarajah was accused of creating a hostile work environment in the Major Investigations Unit at the Baltimore City State's Attorney Office and the Office of the Attorney General. Vignarajah has strongly denied these accusations, telling The Baltimore Sun that he had "supervised nearly 200 interns and law clerks in the past decade without incident".

== Political career ==
On September 14, 2017, Vignarajah declared his candidacy for Baltimore City State's Attorney as a Democrat. He lost the primary with 23% of the vote against 28% for Ivan Bates and 49% for incumbent Marilyn Mosby. Mosby was unopposed in the general election.

After Baltimore Police Commissioner Darryl De Sousa resigned (after being indicted), Vignarajah said the resignation showed the need for the city's top prosecutor to retain the confidence of the public. Ivan Bates, who was one of Vignarajah's opponents in the race for Baltimore City State's attorney, responded that the Project Veritas video shows that Vignarajah lacks the judgment to be State's attorney.

Bates and Vignarajah also clashed over the Syed case, with Bates saying that, if elected, he would drop the case against Syed, because he found the evidence against Syed to be unreliable.

On April 10, 2019, Vignarajah declared his candidacy for the 2020 election for Mayor of the City of Baltimore as a Democrat. He lost the June 2020 primary, taking 11% of the vote.

On March 22, 2022, Vignarajah declared his candidacy for Baltimore City State's Attorney as a Democrat. During the primary, Vignarajah was endorsed by Republican Governor Larry Hogan. Vignarajah was defeated in the Democratic primary on July 19, 2022, by defense attorney Ivan Bates.

In December 2023, Vignarajah formed an exploratory committee to explore a second run for mayor of Baltimore in 2024, seeking to challenge incumbent mayor Brandon Scott. He officially entered the race on January 24, 2024, but withdrew on May 1 and endorsed former mayor Sheila Dixon. After his withdrawal, the Scott campaign alleged that Vignarajah had offered his endorsement to Scott in exchange to become the Baltimore Police Commissioner or the CEO of Baltimore City Public Schools; Scott declined Vignarajah's offer, instead encouraging him to remain in the race. Vignarajah neither confirmed nor denied these accusations. Dixon responded to the Scott campaign's allegations by disputing rumors that she had made a similar agreement with Vignarajah if she wins the Democratic primary. Vignarajah also used the city's public financing program during his mayoral campaign, which limited how much money he could raise but provided his campaign with $669,000 in city funds. After Vignarajah withdrew, Baltimore city councilmember Kristerfer Burnett—who introduced legislation to establish the campaign financing fund in 2018—asked Vignarajah to return all of the public funding he received during his campaign plus interest. In late June 2024, Vignarajah returned $201,303 to the public campaign financing program, which he estimated to be his cash on hand at the end of the campaign. The Baltimore Sun reported in September 2024 that Vignarajah had spent more than $200,000 in publicly backed funds on television ads and a poll in the final days of his campaign, which he said was to cover invoices made during the campaign.

== Police stop ==
Vignarajah was pulled over late into the night on September 26, 2019, by Baltimore City Police. Vignarajah was allegedly driving with suspended license plates. During the traffic stop he asked the officer "We are 600 patrol officers down and that's what you're doing in Greenmount?", then later asked the officers to turn off their body cameras. City Council President Brandon Scott criticized Vignarajah's behavior during the stop, saying "You get into public service to do good for all, not to get special treatment for yourself". Baltimore Police Sgt Bill Shiflett said that Vignarajah put the officers in a no-win position, because turning the cameras off is against police department policy, and Vignarajah knew it.

== See also ==
- List of law clerks for the second seat of the Supreme Court of the United States
