= Brandon Scott =

Mayor of Baltimore since 2020

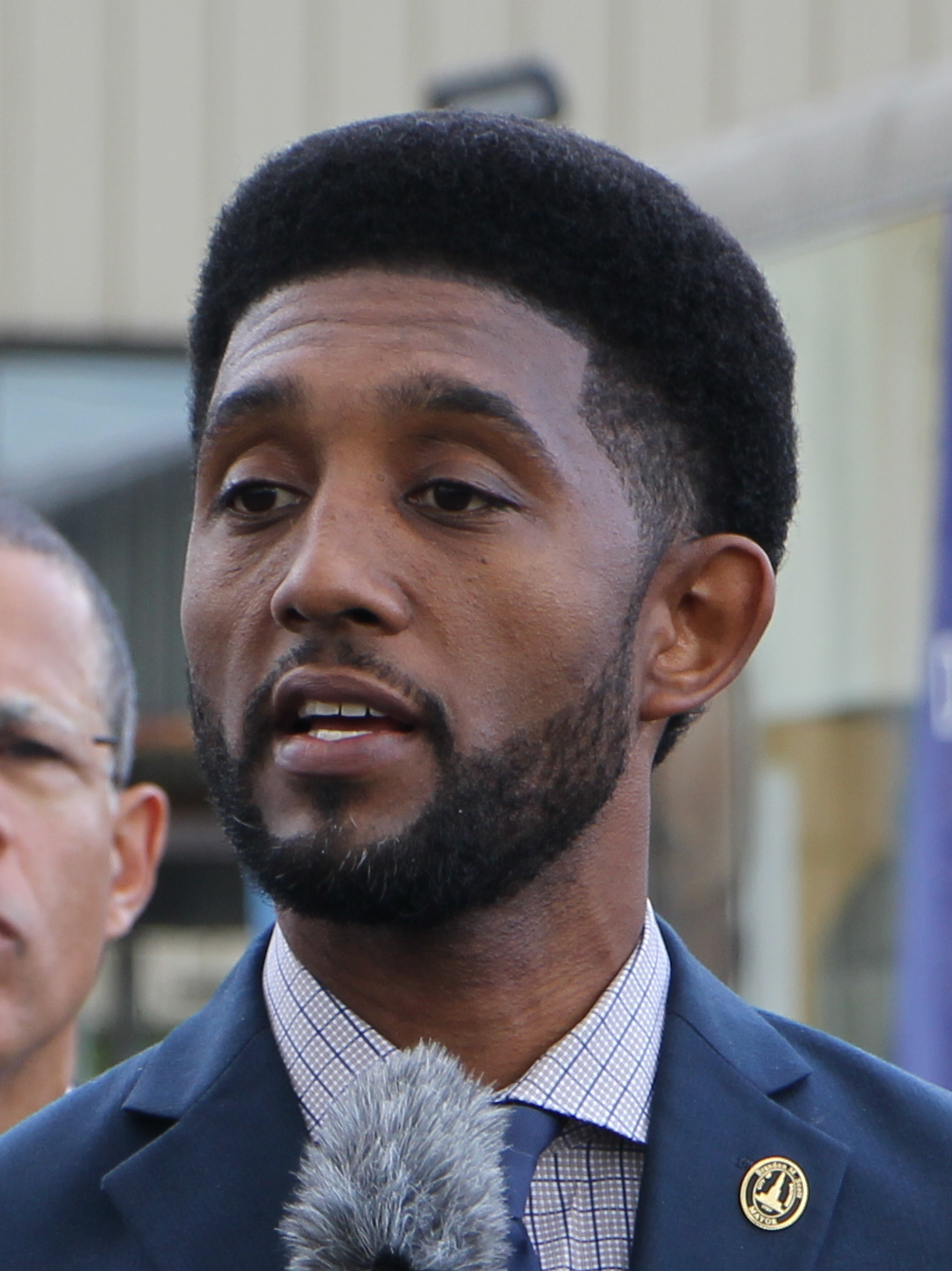
- Scott in 2023

53rd Mayor of Baltimore
- Incumbent
- Assumed office December 8, 2020
- Preceded by: Jack Young

President of the Baltimore City Council
- In office May 6, 2019 – December 8, 2020
- Preceded by: Jack Young
- Succeeded by: Nick Mosby

Member of the Baltimore City Council from the 2nd district
- In office December 8, 2011 – May 8, 2019
- Preceded by: Nicholas D'Adamo
- Succeeded by: Danielle McCray

Personal details
- Born: Brandon Maurice Scott; April 8, 1984 (age 42) Baltimore, Maryland, U.S.
- Party: Democratic
- Spouse: Hana Pugh (m. 2024)
- Children: 2
- Education: St. Mary's College of Maryland (BA)
- Brandon Scott's voice Brandon Scott on public transit in Baltimore. Recorded November 23, 2021

Brandon Maurice Scott (born April 8, 1984) is an American politician serving as the mayor of Baltimore, Maryland, since 2020. He was the president of the Baltimore City Council from 2019 to 2020, having been elected to the position to replace Jack Young following Catherine Pugh's resignation, and a member of the Baltimore City Council from the second district from 2011 to 2019. A member of the Democratic Party, Scott was a candidate for Lieutenant Governor of Maryland during the 2018 Maryland gubernatorial election, as the running mate of Jim Shea.

== Early life and education ==
Scott was born and raised in Park Heights, Baltimore. As a child he admired Congressman Elijah Cummings and saw him as a role model. He ran track and cross country at Mergenthaler Vocational-Technical High School where he graduated in 2002. He went on to receive a degree in political science from St. Mary's College of Maryland in 2006.

== Career ==
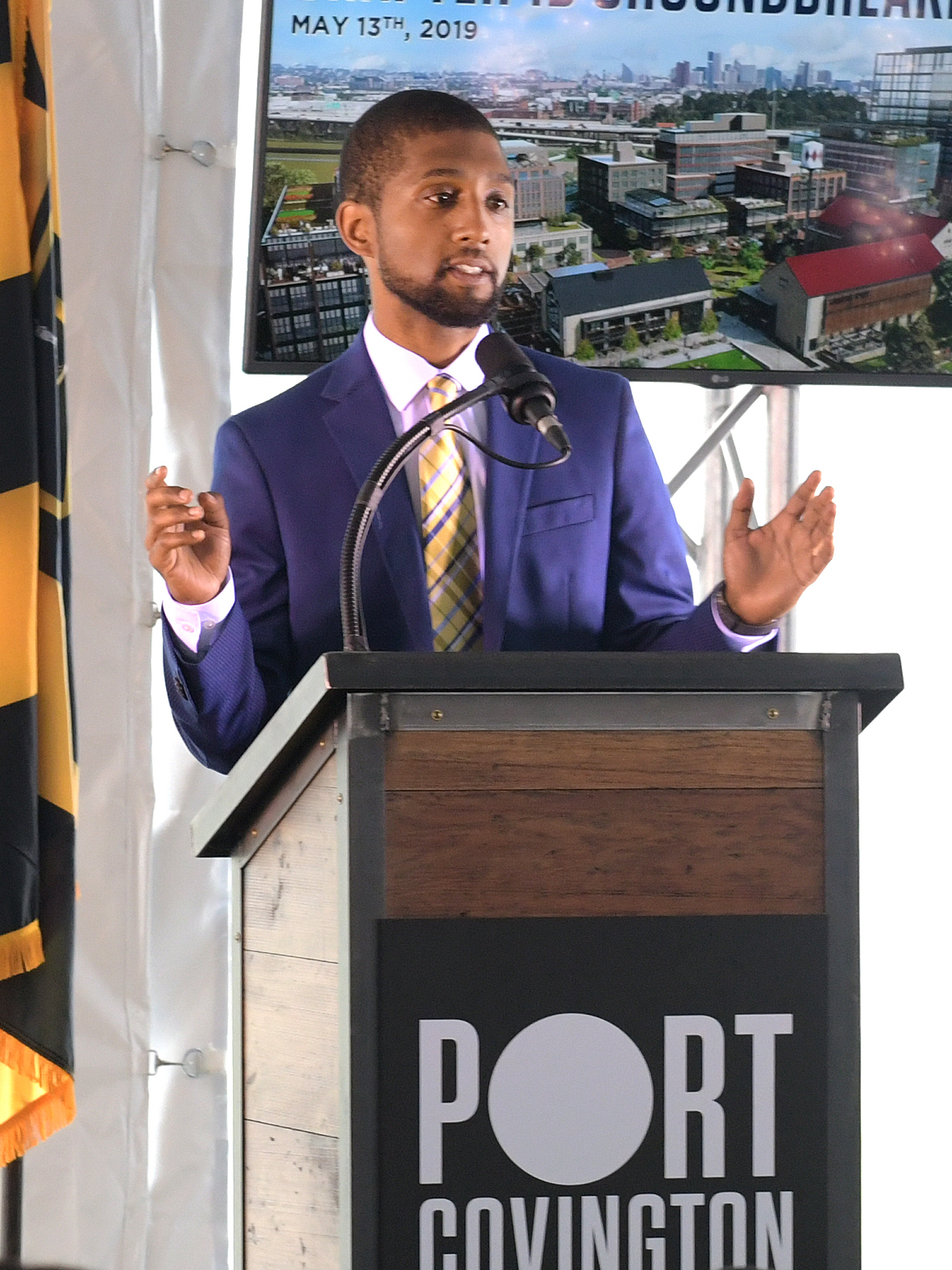
Scott in 2019

After graduating from college, Scott worked as a liaison for City Council president Stephanie Rawlings-Blake. In 2011, he was elected to serve as the city councilperson for the second district, making him one of the youngest ever elected to city office. He was the chair of the Public Safety Committee and a member of the Budget and Appropriations and Judiciary and Legislative Investigations committees.

In early 2018, he passed a bill creating an open data policy in Baltimore. As a council member, Scott oversaw the reinstatement of Council Oversight of the Baltimore Police Department. In May 2019, the Baltimore City Council unanimously voted to elevate Scott to serve as the City Council president, serving the remainder of the term of Bernard C. "Jack" Young, who ascended to the mayoralty following the resignation of Baltimore mayor Catherine Pugh.

Scott has participated in the 300 Man March, a nonviolence group. While serving as city councilperson, he voted against an aerial surveillance program for the Baltimore Police Department and supported reductions in police funding, cutting 22 million dollars from the city's policing budget in 2020.

On February 16, 2018, Baltimore attorney Jim Shea announced the selection of Scott as his running mate in 2018 Maryland gubernatorial election. Scott would later appoint Shea to serve as Baltimore's solicitor under his mayoral administration.

=== Mayor of Baltimore ===
==== Elections ====
===== 2020 =====
Scott announced his campaign for mayor on September 13, 2019, at a press conference in his childhood neighborhood of Park Heights. On June 9, 2020, Scott was declared the winner of the Democratic primary, defeating the incumbent mayor Jack Young. Scott was perceived as more progressive than Young. Scott's victory in the Democratic primary all but assured him victory in the November general election. Democrats have a nearly 10-to-1 advantage in registered voters, and for years the Democratic primary has been the real contest. As expected, he won the November 3, 2020, general election in a landslide, with a nearly 3-to-1 margin over his nearest opponent, independent Bob Wallace. For the second election in a row, the Republicans were pushed into third place.

===== 2024 =====
Scott ran for the second term as mayor in 2024, announcing his reelection campaign on November 18, 2023. He was considered vulnerable, as polls found that Baltimore residents were split on his performance as mayor. During his tenure, Scott faced criticism for his handling of important issues in the city, including schools, constituent services, and crime. However, Scott's response to the Francis Scott Key Bridge collapse, as well as his progress in growing the economy and reducing homicides, allowed him to make inroads with voters and boost his approval rating.

On May 14, 2024, Scott won the city's Democratic primary for his second term as mayor of Baltimore, again beating his rival, Sheila Dixon. He won re-election after defeating Republican challenger Shannon Wright on November 5, 2024, becoming the first Baltimore mayor since Martin O'Malley to win a second term.

==== Tenure ====
Inaugurated in a small, socially distanced ceremony on December 8, 2020, Scott vowed to take on both "public health emergencies" — gun violence and the coronavirus. Taking the office at age 36, Scott is the youngest mayor in Baltimore's history. He was a delegate to the 2024 Democratic National Convention, pledged to Kamala Harris.

==== COVID-19 pandemic ====
On his first day in office, Scott signed an order mandating an end to restaurant dining, both indoor and outdoor, and capping retail activity, religious gatherings, gyms, malls, casinos, and museums to 25 percent capacity. Scott lifted Baltimore's mask mandate and state of emergency declaration on July 1, 2021. In August 2021, Scott reinstated the city's mask mandate following a 374 percent increase in COVID-19 infections in July. The mask mandate expired on March 1, 2022.

In January 2021, Scott and Maryland governor Larry Hogan started a confidence campaign called "GoVax Maryland" encouraging citizens to get vaccinated. In February, Scott launched a new partnership with local universities to boost confidence in and combat misinformation about COVID-19 vaccines.

In March 2021, Scott expressed frustration with the Hogan administration after state health officials denied his request to set aside 50 percent of state's COVID-19 vaccine doses for the state-run mass-vaccination sites in the city. Hogan responded to these criticisms by telling him to "talk to his health department," which he claimed was telling the state health department to send vaccines elsewhere because they had too many. Scott refuted Hogan's charges, calling them "categorically untrue."

In May 2021, Scott delivered a letter to Hogan asking him to impose a temporary statewide eviction moratorium while local jurisdictions continued to distribute federal rent relief funding to tenants and landlords. In January 2022, Scott declined requests from housing advocates to institute an eviction moratorium in Baltimore, saying that he didn't have the power to do it on his own and that action would need to come at the state level.

Scott tested positive for COVID-19 on October 4, 2021. He returned to City Hall on October 15, 2021, after testing negative.

==== Crime and policing ====
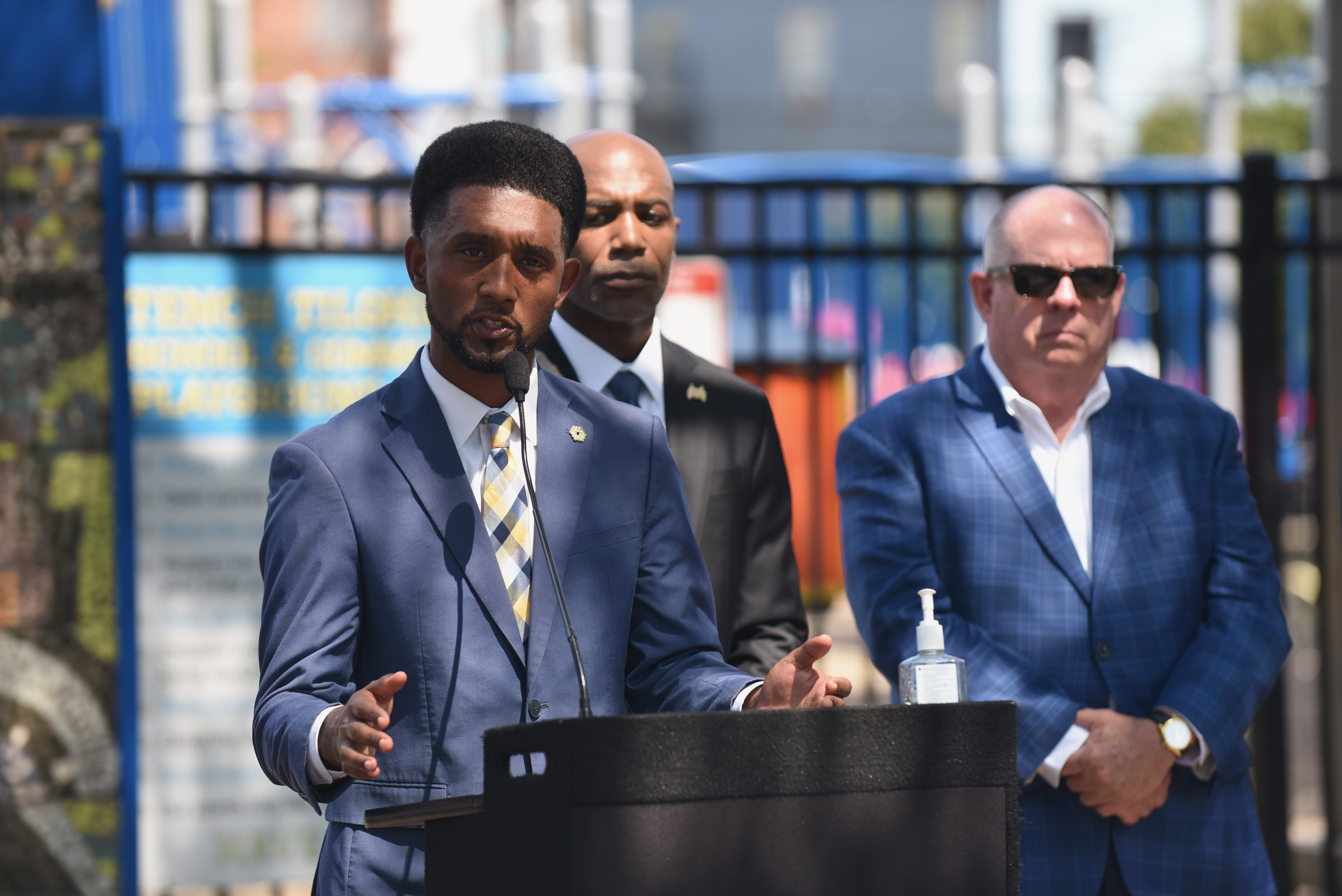
Scott speaks at a press conference on violent crime in Baltimore with U.S. Attorney in Maryland Erek Barron and Governor Larry Hogan, 2022

During his mayoral campaign, Scott vowed to "reduce homicides by 15 percent each year in my term, getting us to below 300 homicides in my first year as mayor" by studying the flow of guns into Baltimore and implementing violence reduction strategies. He also rallied on reforming police spending after leading the charge to cut $22.4 million from the city's $550 million police budget, half of which was for "unallocated" funds.

Despite this, Scott's first budget, introduced in April 2021, included a $28 million increase in the city's police budget. This proposed increase was met with criticism by Baltimore residents. Scott pushed back against this criticism by asking people (as paraphrased by Maryland Matters) "to look at the full picture behind violent crime rather than the 'simple conflict' that leads to the loss of life". His budget was approved without amendments on June 8, 2021. In April 2022, Scott again proposed a $5 million increase in the city's police budget, which was met with further criticism.

In January 2022, Scott implemented the Group Violence Reduction Strategy in the city's Western Police District. This program targets outreach to individuals who are identified as being likely victims or perpetrators of gun violence within the city and stresses community based policing strategies. The four central tenets of the program are the reviewing of gun violence incidents, direct outreach, life coaching, and strategic policing. In December 2022, Scott announced that the district had seen a 33.8% decrease in gun violence. It was also announced that this program would be expanded to other districts in 2023 and 2024.

In February 2022, Scott was named one of 10 new co-chairs of Mayors Against Illegal Guns.

In May 2022, Scott and the Baltimore Police Department launched the Strategic Management and Alternative Response Tactics (SMART) initiative. The goal of this program is to free up city resources by redirecting non-emergencies and mental health crisis to other services, while limiting false alarm calls. The program then in turn hopes to allow officers more time to engage positively with communities and build trust.

In June 2022, Scott and Baltimore city solicitor Ebony Thompson filed a lawsuit against Polymer80, alleging the company flooded the city with privately made firearms which he believes contribute to bloodshed in the city's streets; the lawsuit was settled for $1.2 million in February 2024. In the same month, Scott also signed a bill to implement a Police Accountability Board as mandated by the state's General Assembly. The bill allows up to two former police officers to serve on the 17-person board that will recommend action against officers with alleged misconduct.

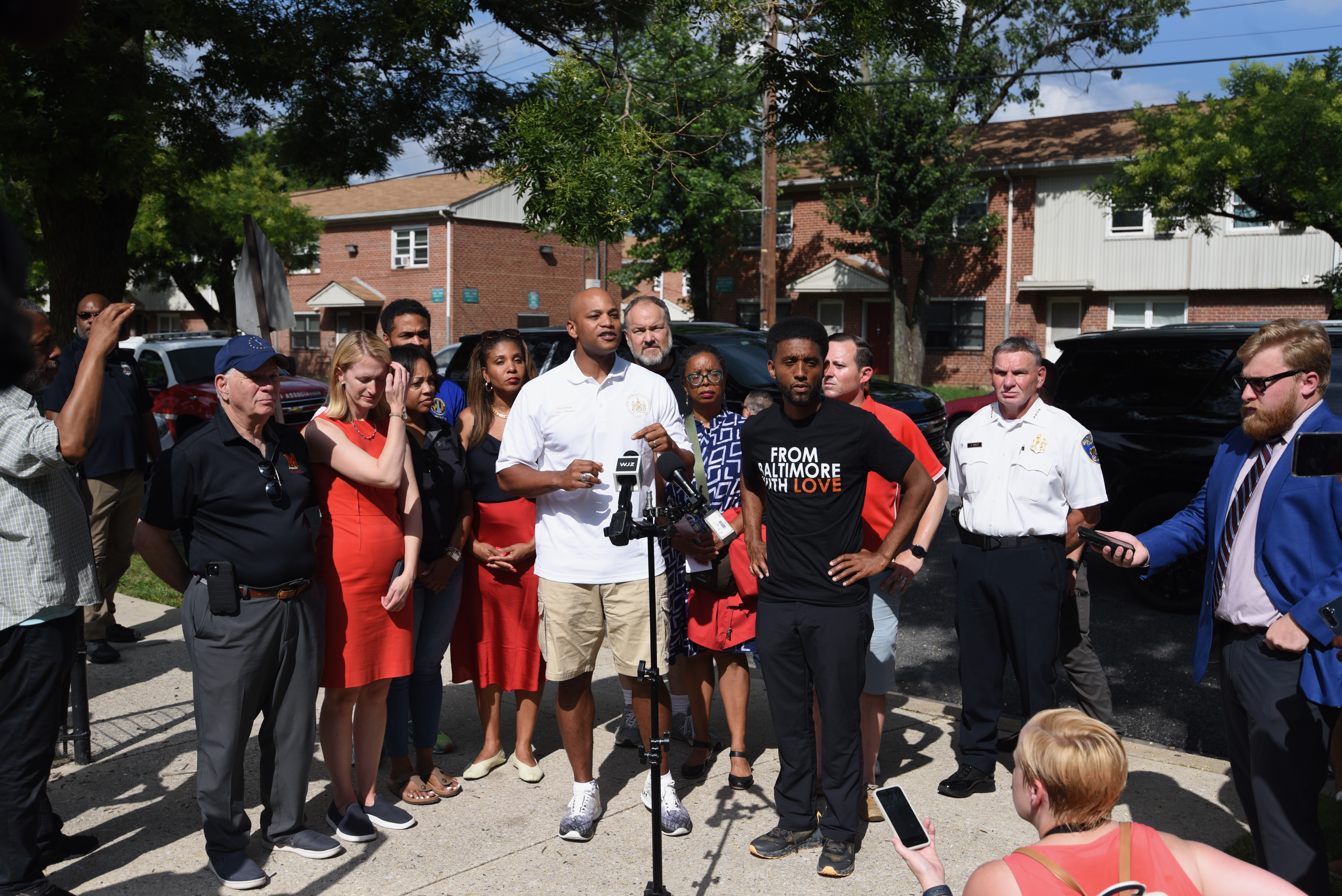
Scott and other Baltimore leaders give a press conference after the Brooklyn Homes shooting, 2023

In July 2023, following a shooting in the Brooklyn neighborhood that left two dead and 28 injured, Scott released a statement expressing condolences and called for further crackdowns on illegal guns coming in from other states and criticized people who uploaded videos of the incident to social media for not intervening. He also defended the role of the police and the city's Safe Streets gun violence program against criticism, saying the focus should "instead be on a few people who cowardly decided to shoot up a big block party celebration for a community".

In March 2024, The Baltimore Banner reported that homicides and shootings overall were trending downward city-wide since 2022.

In August 2025, Scott condemned comments made by President Donald Trump about crime in Baltimore, pointing to statistics showing a downward trend in violent crime in both the city and nationwide. After Trump threatened to mobilize the National Guard in Baltimore, Scott said that his administration was working with the state to explore legal remedies against any federal intervention and urged city residents to stand up for the city but to keep a measured response to avoid fueling the president's narrative.

==== Housing ====
In May 2021, Scott removed owner-occupied homes that faced tax sale liens from the city's annual tax sale, an online auction that the city uses to collect overdue bills. In September 2021, he announced that Baltimore would purchase the liens of 454 owner-occupied homes to keep them out of the city's tax sale process. In April 2022, Scott removed all owner-occupied homes from the city's tax sale and postponed the auction until June.

In May 2021, Scott delivered his first veto of his mayorship on a bill that would give renters more options when paying security deposits.

In June 2021, Scott launched a fund to cover up to $2,000 in security deposits for low-income tenants, funded with $3.3 million in supplemental funds from a fiscal year 2020 pandemic-related Community Services Block Grant.

On January 25, 2022, a fire at an unoccupied rowhouse building killed three firefighters and left another on life support. In response to the fire, Scott announced a citywide review of its operations related to vacant properties.

In February 2022, Scott announced that the city would spend $90.4 million in funding received from the American Rescue Plan Act of 2021 on homelessness services, including the purchase two hotels to provide 275 beds for the city's homeless population.

In December 2023, Scott's administration joined other community leaders in announcing an $8 billion plan to revitalize some parts of the city blighted by abandoned or vacant properties. In March 2023, the administration announced its support for a Baltimore City Council proposal to make some vacant properties available for purchase starting at $1, though critics of the proposal have suggested that such a policy would not directly benefit current residents or legacy residents of Baltimore.

==== Guaranteed income ====
In April 2022, Scott announced a guaranteed income pilot program to provide 200 young parents between the ages of 18 and 24 with payments of $1,000 per month over two years. The funding for the 4.8 million dollar project comes from the American Rescue Plan Act. The pilot program began distributing the funds to lottery winners in August 2022. In order to enter the lottery, applicants needed to be US citizens, below 300% of the federal poverty level, a parent or guardian of a child, and within the age requirements of program when the applications closed.

==== Transportation ====
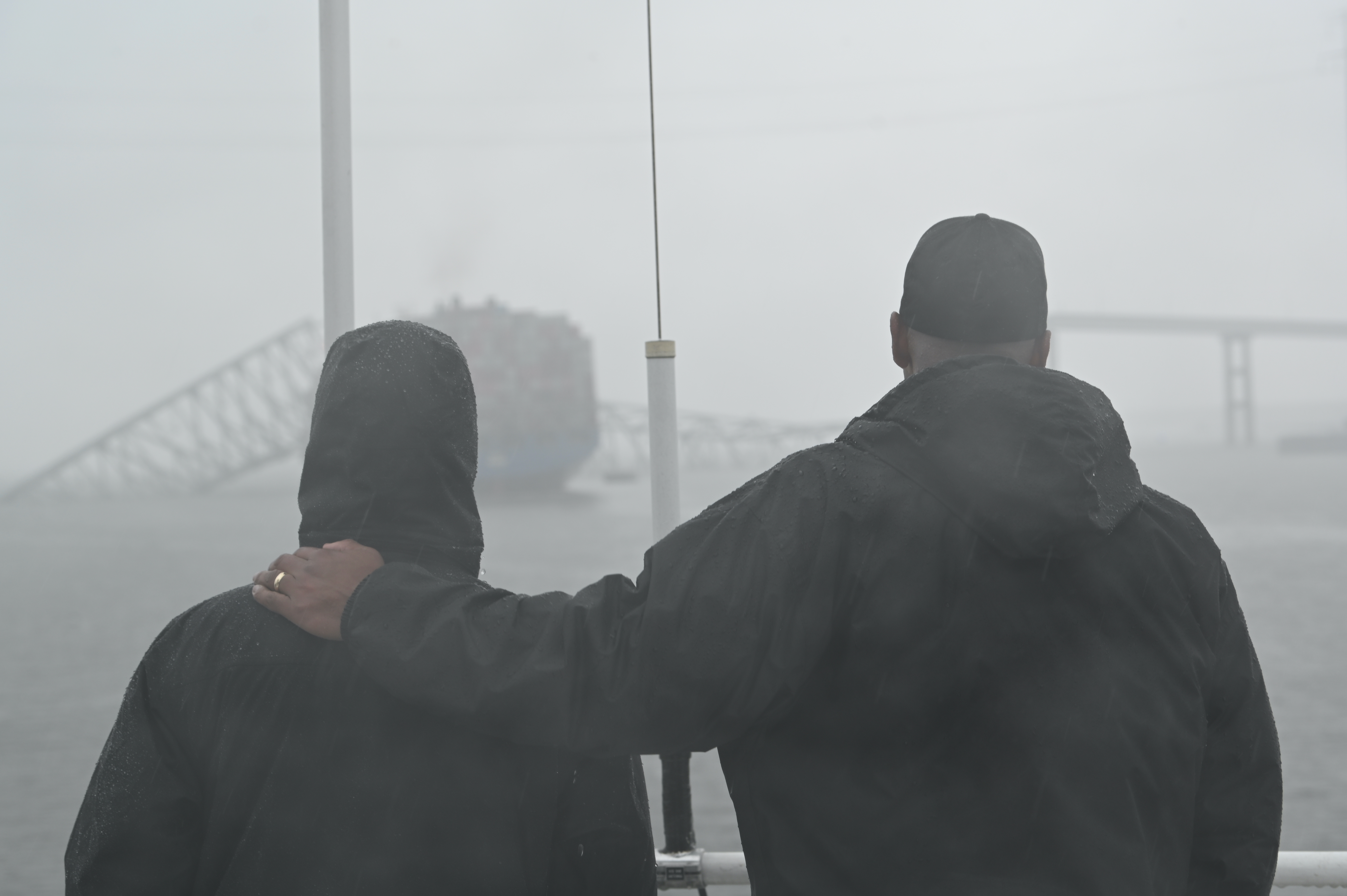
Scott visits the Francis Scott Key Bridge collapse site with Governor Wes Moore, 2024

In April 2021, Scott announced that he would be working to revive the Red line project that was killed by Governor Larry Hogan. The project plan to build an east–west rail line would have created a rise in economic development while also creating new connections for isolated low-income neighborhoods.

In June 2021, Scott announced his opposition to a proposal to construct a Maglev connecting Baltimore and Washington, D.C., delivering a letter to the Maryland Department of Planning urging them to reject the project.

In September 2021, Scott criticized the state's proposed transportation budget, which included $500 million in investments for the Purple Line in Prince George's County, for not including enough funding for infrastructure projects in Baltimore. In order to help prioritize projects in the city, Scott created The Mayor's Office of Infrastructure Development in June 2022 and appointed Matthew Garbark to head the department.

In November 2021, Scott joined President Joe Biden in a visit to the Port of Baltimore, where he hailed the Infrastructure Investment and Jobs Act as a plan to rebuild America and create "good-paying, union jobs."

In April 2022, Scott launched the "Let's Ride to Work" program, which is a partnership between Mayor's Office of Employment Development and Lyft which is being funded by the American Rescue Plan Act. The program would allow newly employed workers up to 40 free rides to and from work.

Scott was notified of the Francis Scott Key Bridge collapse minutes after the collision on March 26, 2024. Talking to reporters in the hours following the incident, Scott emphasized that rescue operations were his top priority. Scott received national media attention during the event, prompting a rise in racist remarks directed towards him on social media.

== Personal life ==
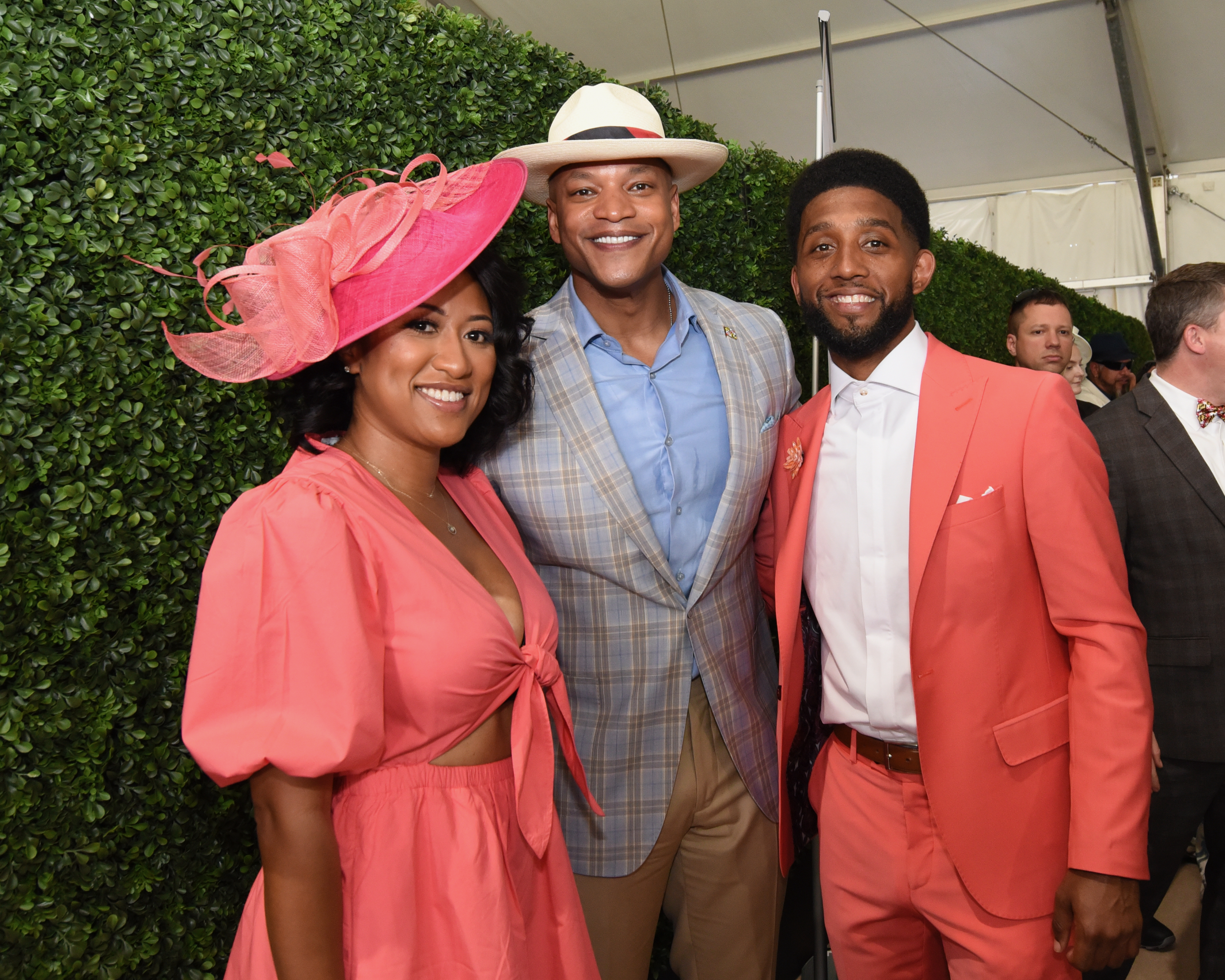
Scott and his fiancée Hana Pugh at the 2023 Preakness Stakes with Governor Wes Moore

Scott became engaged to his girlfriend, Hana Pugh, on December 25, 2023. Their first child was born the following day. They married on August 11, 2024. In September 2024, Scott and his wife announced that they were expecting a second child, a baby girl, who was born on March 8, 2025. Scott lives in Frankford, Baltimore.

== Electoral history ==
2020 Baltimore mayoral election, Democratic primary
Party	Candidate	Votes	%
Democratic	Brandon Scott	43,927	29.6
Democratic	Sheila Dixon	40,782	27.5
Democratic	Mary Miller	23,193	15.6
Democratic	Thiru Vignarajah	17,080	11.5
Democratic	Bernard C. "Jack" Young (incumbent)	9,256	6.2
Democratic	T. J. Smith	8,593	5.8
Democratic	Carlmichael Cannady	2,473	1.7
Democratic	Mary Washington	1,028	0.7
Democratic	Valerie Cunningham	339	0.2
Democratic	Keith Scott	303	0.2
Democratic	Yasaun Young	188	0.1
Democratic	Ralph Johnson, Jr.	177	0.1
Democratic	Yolanda Pulley	152	0.1
Democratic	Lou Catelli	151	0.1
Democratic	Dante Swinton	143	0.1
Democratic	Michael Jenson	131	0.1
Democratic	Brian Salsberry	129	0.1
Democratic	Rikki Vaughn	116	0.1
Democratic	Liri Fusha	57	0.0
Democratic	Terry McCready	46	0.0
Democratic	Sean Gresh	45	0.0
Democratic	James Jones II	33	0.0
Democratic	Erik Powery	32	0.0
Democratic	Frederick Ware-Newsome	31	0.0
Total votes		148,405	100.00

2020 General Election
Party	Candidate	Votes	%
Democratic	Brandon Scott	164,661	70.49
Independent	Bob Wallace	47,275	20.24
Republican	Shannon Wright	16,664	7.13
Working Class	David Harding	3,973	1.70
Write-in		1,007	0.43
Total votes		233,580	100

2024 Baltimore mayoral election
Party	Candidate	Votes	%	±%
Democratic	Brandon Scott (incumbent)	179,732	82.15%	+11.66%
Republican	Shannon Wright	36,484	16.68%	+9.55%
Write-in		2,574	1.18%	+0.75%
Total votes		218,790	100.00%	

Political offices
Preceded by Jack Young	Mayor of Baltimore; 2020–present	Incumbent
