= 2020 Baltimore City Council election =

- November 3, 2020

15 seats on Baltimore City Council 8 seats needed for a majority
	Majority party
Party	Democratic
Last election	15
Seats won	15
President before election
Brandon Scott
Democratic
Elected President
Nick Mosby
Democratic

The 2020 Baltimore City Council election was held on November 3, 2020. The primary elections were held on April 28, 2020. All 15 seats of the Baltimore City Council were up for election.

== Summary of results by district ==
District	Incumbent				Candidates
Location	Member	Party	First elected	Status	Candidates
President	Brandon Scott	Democratic	2019 (appointed)	Incumbent retired to run for mayor. Democratic hold.	▌ ✓ Nick Mosby (Democratic) 79.5%; ▌Jovani Patterson (Republican) 19.0%
1	Zeke Cohen	Democratic	2016	Incumbent re-elected.	▌ ✓ Zeke Cohen (Democratic) 95.4%
2	Danielle McCray	Democratic	2019 (appointed)	Incumbent re-elected.	▌ ✓ Danielle McCray (Democratic) 87.4%; ▌Brendon Joyner-El (Republican) 12.3%
3	Ryan Dorsey	Democratic	2016	Incumbent re-elected.	▌ ✓ Ryan Dorsey (Democratic) 83.4%; ▌David Wright (Republican) 15.8%
4	Bill Henry	Democratic	2007	Incumbent retired to run for Comptroller. Democratic hold.	▌ ✓ Mark Conway (Democratic) 98.9%
5	Yitzy Schleifer	Democratic	2016	Incumbent re-elected.	▌ ✓ Yitzy Schleifer (Democratic) 88.4%; ▌Maria Mandela Vismale (Republican) 10.6%
6	Sharon Green Middleton	Democratic	2007 (appointed)	Incumbent re-elected.	▌ ✓ Sharon Green Middleton (Democratic) 89.9%; ▌Michelle Andrews (Republican) 12.3%
7	Leon Pinkett	Democratic	2016	Incumbent retired to run for City Council President. New member elected. Democratic hold.	▌ ✓ James Torrence (Democratic) 90.1%; ▌Christopher Anderson (Republican) 9.5%
8	Kristerfer Burnett	Democratic	2016	Incumbent re-elected.	▌ ✓ Kristerfer Burnett (Democratic) 99.2%
9	John Bullock	Democratic	2016	Incumbent re-elected.	▌ ✓ John Bullock (Democratic) 98.3%
10	Ed Reisinger	Democratic	1995	Incumbent retired. New member elected. Democratic hold.	▌ ✓ Phylicia Porter (Democratic) 78.7%; ▌Michael Nolet (Republican) 20.9%
11	Eric Costello	Democratic	2014 (appointed)	Incumbent re-elected.	▌ ✓ Eric Costello (Democratic) 97.0%
12	Robert Stokes	Democratic	2016	Incumbent re-elected.	▌ ✓ Robert Stokes (Democratic) 59.5%; ▌Franca Muller (Green) 35.9%; ▌Eugene Boikai (Republican) 4.3%
13	Shannon Sneed	Democratic	2016	Incumbent retired to run for City Council President. New member elected. Democratic hold.	▌ ✓ Antonio Glover (Democratic) 98.7%
14	Mary Pat Clarke	Democratic	2003	Incumbent retired. New member elected. Democratic hold.	▌ ✓ Odette Ramos (Democratic) 91.0%; ▌Charles Long (Republican) 8.5%

== City council president ==
=== Democratic primary ===
==== Nominee ====
- Nick Mosby, state delegate from the 40th district (2017–present) and husband of Baltimore state's attorney Marilyn Mosby

==== Eliminated in primary ====
- Leo Burroughs, activist
- Marques Dent, educator
- Leon Pinkett, city councilmember from the 7th district (2016–present)
- Shannon Sneed, city councilmember from the 13th district (2016–present)
- Dan Sparaco, attorney
- Carl Stokes, former city councilmember from the 12th district (2010–2016) and candidate for mayor in 1999 and 2016

==== Declined ====
- Brandon Scott, incumbent city council president (ran for mayor)

==== Results ====
Democratic primary results
Party	Candidate	Votes	%
Democratic	Nick Mosby	55,424	40.2%
Democratic	Shannon Sneed	40,474	29.4%
Democratic	Carl Stokes	29,012	21.1%
Democratic	Leon Pinkett	5,503	4.0%
Democratic	Dan Sparaco	3,755	2.7%
Democratic	Marques Dent	2,199	1.6%
Democratic	Leo Burroughs	1,408	1.0%
Total votes		137,775	100.0%

=== Republican primary ===
==== Nominee ====
- Jovani Patterson

==== Results ====
Republican primary results
Party	Candidate	Votes	%
Republican	Jovani Patterson	4,918	100.0%
Total votes		4,918	100.0%

=== General election ===
==== Results ====
Baltimore City Council presidential election, 2020
Party	Candidate	Votes	%
Democratic	Nick Mosby	178,689	79.5%
Republican	Jovani Patterson	42,628	19.0%
Write-in		3,361	1.5%
Total votes		224,678	100.0%

== District 1 ==
=== Democratic primary ===
==== Nominee ====
- Zeke Cohen, incumbent city councilmember

==== Eliminated in primary ====
- Paris Bienert, social worker

==== Results ====
Democratic primary results
Party	Candidate	Votes	%
Democratic	Zeke Cohen (incumbent)	6,336	66.5%
Democratic	Paris Bienert	3,191	33.5%
Total votes		9,527	100.0%

=== General election ===
==== Results ====
Baltimore City Council District 1 election, 2020
Party	Candidate	Votes	%
Democratic	Zeke Cohen (incumbent)	17,588	95.4%
Write-in		843	4.6%
Total votes		18,431	100.0%

== District 2 ==
=== Democratic primary ===
==== Nominee ====
- Danielle McCray, incumbent city councilmember

==== Eliminated in primary ====
- Melissa Bagley
- Tamira Dunn, city health department official

==== Results ====
Democratic primary results
Party	Candidate	Votes	%
Democratic	Danielle McCray (incumbent)	5,607	59.1%
Democratic	Tamira Dunn	2,667	28.1%
Democratic	Melissa Bagley	1,219	12.8%
Total votes		9,493	100.0%

=== Republican primary ===
==== Nominee ====
- Brendon Joyner-El

==== Results ====
Republican primary results
Party	Candidate	Votes	%
Republican	Brendon Joyner-El	551	100.0%
Total votes		551	100.0%

=== General election ===
==== Results ====
Baltimore City Council District 2 election, 2020
Party	Candidate	Votes	%
Democratic	Danielle McCray (incumbent)	13,353	87.4%
Republican	Brendon Joyner-El	1,884	12.3%
Write-in		44	0.3%
Total votes		15,281	100.0%

== District 3 ==
=== Democratic primary ===
==== Nominee ====
- Ryan Dorsey, incumbent city councilmember

==== Eliminated in primary ====
- Mel Munk
- Rain Pryor, actress

==== Results ====
Democratic primary results
Party	Candidate	Votes	%
Democratic	Ryan Dorsey (incumbent)	6,704	58.4%
Democratic	Rain Pryor	4,149	36.1%
Democratic	Mel Munk	629	5.5%
Total votes		11,482	100.0%

=== General election ===
==== Results ====
Baltimore City Council District 3 election, 2020
Party	Candidate	Votes	%
Democratic	Ryan Dorsey (incumbent)	15,691	96.13%
Write-in		631	3.87%
Total votes		16,322	100.0%

== District 4 ==
=== Democratic primary ===
==== Nominee ====
- Mark Conway, nonprofit executive and former deputy director of CitiStat

==== Eliminated in primary ====
- Anson Asaka, attorney
- V. Lee Brady, teacher
- William Broaddus III, Republican nominee for this district in 2016
- Stanley Cole
- Zac Dingle, social worker
- Logan Endow, outreach worker
- Tim Goldsby Jr., community activist
- Nicole Harris-Crest, attorney
- Angie Winder, chair of the 43rd District Democratic State Central Committee

==== Declined ====
- Bill Henry, incumbent city councilmember (ran for comptroller)

==== Results ====
Democratic primary results
Party	Candidate	Votes	%
Democratic	Mark Conway	3,405	28.2%
Democratic	Logan Endow	3,184	26.3%
Democratic	Nicole E. Harris-Crest	2,428	20.1%
Democratic	Zac Dingle	1,106	9.1%
Democratic	Angie Winder	867	7.2%
Democratic	Anson Asaka	349	2.9%
Democratic	William "Sam" Broaddus, III	311	2.6%
Democratic	Stanley Cole	195	1.6%
Democratic	V. Lee Brady	123	1.0%
Democratic	Tim Goldsby, Jr.	122	1.0%
Total votes		12,090	100.0%

=== General election ===
==== Results ====
Baltimore City Council District 4 election, 2020
Party	Candidate	Votes	%
Democratic	Mark Conway (incumbent)	16,958	98.9%
Write-in		186	1.1%
Total votes		17,144	100.0%

== District 5 ==
=== Democratic primary ===
==== Nominee ====
- Isaac "Yitzy" Schleifer, incumbent city councilmember

==== Eliminated in primary ====
- Chris Ervin, nonprofit executive

==== Results ====
Democratic primary results
Party	Candidate	Votes	%
Democratic	Isaac "Yitzy" Schleifer (incumbent)	7,923	63.1%
Democratic	Chris Ervin	4,635	36.9%
Total votes		12,558	100.0%

=== Republican primary ===
==== Nominee ====
- Maria Mandela Vismale

==== Results ====
Republican primary results
Party	Candidate	Votes	%
Republican	Maria Mandela Vismale	543	100.0%
Total votes		543	100.0%

=== General election ===
==== Results ====
Baltimore City Council District 5 election, 2020
Party	Candidate	Votes	%
Democratic	Isaac "Yitzy" Schleifer (incumbent)	16,688	88.4%
Republican	Maria Mandela Vismale	2,007	10.6%
Write-in		190	1.0%
Total votes		18,885	100.0%

== District 6 ==
=== Democratic primary ===
==== Nominee ====
- Sharon Green Middleton, incumbent city councilmember

==== Eliminated in primary ====
- Taurus Barksdale
- Timothy Mercer

==== Results ====
Democratic primary results
Party	Candidate	Votes	%
Democratic	Sharon Green Middleton (incumbent)	6,195	64.2%
Democratic	Taurus Barksdale	2,756	28.6%
Democratic	Timothy Mercer	698	7.2%
Total votes		9,649	100.0%

=== Republican primary ===
==== Nominee ====
- Michelle Andrews

==== Results ====
Republican primary results
Party	Candidate	Votes	%
Republican	Michelle Andrews	162	100.0%
Total votes		162	100.0%

=== General election ===
==== Results ====
Baltimore City Council District 6 election, 2020
Party	Candidate	Votes	%
Democratic	Sharon Green Middleton (incumbent)	13,247	89.9%
Republican	Michelle Andrews	1,421	9.6%
Write-in		74	0.5%
Total votes		14,742	100.0%

== District 7 ==
=== Democratic primary ===
==== Nominee ====
- James Torrence, policy professional

==== Eliminated in primary ====
- Rodney Hudson
- Tori Rose
- Brian Sims
- Michael Ter Avest

==== Declined ====
- Leon Pinkett, incumbent city councilmember (ran for city council president)

==== Results ====
Democratic primary results
Party	Candidate	Votes	%
Democratic	James Torrence	3,276	35.8%
Democratic	Tori Rose	2,180	23.8%
Democratic	Brian Sims	2,091	22.9%
Democratic	Rodney Hudson	1,428	15.6%
Democratic	Michael C. Ter Avest	173	1.9%
Total votes		9,148	100.0%

=== Republican primary ===
==== Nominee ====
- Christopher Anderson

==== Results ====
Democratic primary results
Party	Candidate	Votes	%
Republican	Christopher Anderson	141	100.0%
Total votes		141	100.0%

=== General election ===
==== Results ====
Baltimore City Council District 7 election, 2020
Party	Candidate	Votes	%
Democratic	James Torrence	13,643	90.1%
Republican	Christopher Anderson	1,438	9.5%
Write-in		63	0.4%
Total votes		15,144	100.0%

== District 8 ==
=== Democratic primary ===
==== Nominee ====
- Kristerfer Burnett, incumbent city councilmember

==== Eliminated in primary ====
- Anthony Greene

==== Results ====
Democratic primary results
Party	Candidate	Votes	%
Democratic	Kristerfer Burnett (incumbent)	6,613	62.7%
Democratic	Anthony Greene	3,932	37.3%
Total votes		10,545	100.0%

=== General election ===
==== Results ====
Baltimore City Council District 8 election, 2020
Party	Candidate	Votes	%
Democratic	Kristerfer Burnett (incumbent)	15,816	99.2%
Write-in		120	0.8%
Total votes		15,936	100.0%

== District 9 ==
=== Democratic primary ===
==== Nominee ====
- John Bullock, incumbent city councilmember

==== Eliminated in primary ====
- Tyrone Barnwell
- Amefike Changamire
- Derwin Hannah

==== Results ====
Democratic primary results
Party	Candidate	Votes	%
Democratic	John Bullock (incumbent)	4,235	66.2%
Democratic	Tyrone L. Barnwell	1,182	18.5%
Democratic	Amefike Kofi Changamire	589	9.2%
Democratic	Derwin Hannah	389	6.1%
Total votes		6,395	100.0%

=== General election ===
==== Results ====
Baltimore City Council District 9 election, 2020
Party	Candidate	Votes	%
Democratic	John Bullock (incumbent)	9,614	98.3%
Write-in		164	1.7%
Total votes		9,975	100.0%

== District 10 ==
=== Democratic primary ===
==== Nominee ====
- Phylicia Porter, public health policy expert

==== Eliminated in primary ====
- Keisha Allen, physician
- Bob Cockey, business owner
- Ray Conaway, teacher
- Natasha Guynes, nonprofit executive
- Kerry Eugene Hamilton
- Ebony Harvin
- Cynthia Hendricks Jones
- Bill Marker

==== Declined ====
- Ed Reisinger, incumbent city councilmember

==== Results ====
Democratic primary results
Party	Candidate	Votes	%
Democratic	Phylicia Porter	1,689	32.0%
Democratic	Keisha Allen	904	17.1%
Democratic	Ebony Harvin	612	11.6%
Democratic	Ray Conaway	462	8.7%
Democratic	Bill Marker	462	8.7%
Democratic	Natasha Guynes	457	8.6%
Democratic	Bob Cockey	343	6.5%
Democratic	Cynthia Hendricks Jones	184	3.5%
Democratic	Kerry Eugene Hamilton	172	3.3%
Total votes		5,285	100.0%

=== Republican primary ===
==== Nominee ====
- Michael Nolet

==== Eliminated in primary ====
- Mekkah Mohammed, perennial candidate

=== General election ===
==== Results ====
Baltimore City Council District 10 election, 2020
Party	Candidate	Votes	%
Democratic	Phylicia Porter	8,313	78.7%
Republican	Michael Nolet	2,213	20.9%
Write-in		41	0.4%
Total votes		10,667	100.0%

== District 11 ==
=== Democratic primary ===
==== Nominee ====
- Eric Costello, incumbent city councilmember

==== Results ====
Democratic primary results
Party	Candidate	Votes	%
Democratic	Eric Costello (incumbent)	9,021	100.0%
Total votes		9,021	100.0%

=== General election ===
==== Results ====
Baltimore City Council District 11 election, 2020
Party	Candidate	Votes	%
Democratic	Eric Costello (incumbent)	19,543	97.0%
Write-in		612	3.0%
Total votes		20,155	100.0%

== District 12 ==
=== Democratic primary ===
==== Nominee ====
- Robert Stokes Sr., incumbent city councilmember

==== Eliminated in primary ====
- Haroon Ajaz
- Gary Crum
- Dave Heilker, nonprofit communications director
- Matthew Reeds
- Phillip Lee Westry, attorney

==== Results ====
Democratic primary results
Party	Candidate	Votes	%
Democratic	Robert Stokes Sr. (incumbent)	3,180	40.4%
Democratic	Phillip Lee Westry	2,932	37.3%
Democratic	Gary Crum	757	9.6%
Democratic	Dave Heilker	463	5.9%
Democratic	Matthew Reeds	304	3.9%
Democratic	Haroon Ajaz	226	2.9%
Total votes		7,862	100.0%

=== Republican primary ===
==== Nominee ====
- Eugene Boikai

=== Third-party candidates ===
==== Declared ====
- Franca Muller (Green), labor union representative

=== General election ===
==== Results ====
Baltimore City Council District 12 election, 2020
Party	Candidate	Votes	%
Democratic	Robert Stokes Sr. (incumbent)	8,079	59.5%
Green	Franca Muller	4,868	35.9%
Republican	Eugene Boikai	582	4.3%
Total votes		13,529	100.0%

== District 13 ==
=== Democratic primary ===
==== Nominee ====
- Antonio Glover

==== Eliminated in primary ====
- Jackie Addison, community liaison
- Raymond Wallace David
- Wesley Hawkins
- Kevin Parson, nonprofit director
- Akil Patterson, consultant
- Clarence Thomas

==== Declined ====
- Shannon Sneed, incumbent city councilmember (ran for city council president)

==== Results ====
Democratic primary results
Party	Candidate	Votes	%
Democratic	Antonio Glover	2,830	35.8%
Democratic	Jackie Addison	2,123	26.9%
Democratic	Akil Patterson	988	12.5%
Democratic	Clarence Thomas	708	9.0%
Democratic	Wesley Hawkins	597	7.6%
Democratic	Kevin Parson	524	6.6%
Democratic	Raymond Wallace David	134	1.7%
Total votes		7,904	100.0%

=== General election ===
==== Results ====
Baltimore City Council District 13 election, 2020
Party	Candidate	Votes	%
Democratic	Antonio Glover	11,369	98.7%
Write-in		145	1.3%
Total votes		11,514	100.0%

== District 14 ==
=== Democratic primary ===
==== Nominee ====
- Odette Ramos, nonprofit executive and member of the Baltimore City Democratic Central Committee

==== Eliminated in primary ====
- Rita Church, human services case manager
- Joe Kane, community activist
- Stephanie Murdock, former legislative director of city councilmember Mary Pat Clarke

==== Declined ====
- Mary Pat Clarke, incumbent city councilmember (endorsed Ramos)

==== Results ====
Democratic primary results
Party	Candidate	Votes	%
Democratic	Odette Ramos	7,352	64.9%
Democratic	Joseph A. Kane, II	1,719	15.2%
Democratic	Stephanie Murdock	1,272	11.2%
Democratic	Rita Church	988	8.7%
Total votes		11,331	100.0%

=== Republican primary ===
==== Nominee ====
- Charles Long

==== Results ====
Republican primary results
Party	Candidate	Votes	%
Republican	Charles A. Long	279	100.0%
Total votes		279	100.0%

=== General election ===
==== Results ====
Baltimore City Council District 14 election, 2020
Party	Candidate	Votes	%
Democratic	Odette Ramos	15,983	91.0%
Republican	Charles Long	1,502	8.5%
Write-in		88	0.5%
Total votes		17,573	100.0%
