= 2024 Baltimore City Council election =

- November 5, 2024

15 seats on Baltimore City Council 8 seats needed for a majority
	Majority party
Party	Democratic
Last election	15
Seats won	15
President before election
Nick Mosby
Democratic
Elected President
Zeke Cohen
Democratic

The 2024 Baltimore City Council election was held on November 5, 2024. The primary elections were held on May 14, 2024. All 15 seats of the Baltimore City Council were up for election.

== Summary of results by district ==
Baltimore's city council districts

District	Incumbent				Candidates
Location	Member	Party	First elected	Status	Candidates
President	Nick Mosby	Democratic	2020	Incumbent lost renomination. Democratic hold.	▌ ✓ Zeke Cohen (Democratic) 89.0%; ▌Emmanuel Digman (Republican) 10.7%
1	Zeke Cohen	Democratic	2016	Incumbent retired to run for City Council President. New member to be elected. Democratic hold.	▌ ✓ Mark Parker (Democratic) 98.0%
2	Danielle McCray	Democratic	2019 (appointed)	Incumbent re-elected.	▌ ✓ Danielle McCray (Democratic) 87.5%; ▌Andy Zipay (Republican) 12.2%
3	Ryan Dorsey	Democratic	2016	Incumbent re-elected.	▌ ✓ Ryan Dorsey (Democratic) 96.1%
4	Mark Conway	Democratic	2020	Incumbent re-elected.	▌ ✓ Mark Conway (Democratic) 99.0%
5	Yitzy Schleifer	Democratic	2016	Incumbent re-elected.	▌ ✓ Yitzy Schleifer (Democratic) 98.4%
6	Sharon Green Middleton	Democratic	2007 (appointed)	Incumbent re-elected.	▌ ✓ Sharon Green Middleton (Democratic) 98.5%
7	James Torrence	Democratic	2020	Incumbent re-elected.	▌ ✓ James Torrence (Democratic) 91.1%; ▌Christopher Anderson (Republican) 8.4%
8	Kristerfer Burnett	Democratic	2016	Incumbent retired. Democratic hold.	▌ ✓ Paris Gray (Democratic) 99.2%
9	John Bullock	Democratic	2016	Incumbent re-elected.	▌ ✓ John Bullock (Democratic) 97.6%
10	Phylicia Porter	Democratic	2020	Incumbent re-elected.	▌ ✓ Phylicia Porter (Democratic) 97.5%
11	Eric Costello	Democratic	2014 (appointed)	Incumbent lost renomination. Democratic hold.	▌ ✓ Zac Blanchard (Democratic) 97.9%
12	Robert Stokes	Democratic	2016	Incumbent lost renomination. Democratic hold.	▌ ✓ Jermaine Jones (Democratic) 99.0%
13	Antonio Glover	Democratic	2020	Incumbent re-elected.	▌ ✓ Antonio Glover (Democratic) 90.2%; ▌Alexander Artis (Republican) 9.3%
14	Odette Ramos	Democratic	2020	Incumbent re-elected.	▌ ✓ Odette Ramos (Democratic) 90.8%; ▌Renaud Deaundre Brown (Green) 8.8%

== City council president ==
=== Democratic primary ===
==== Nominee ====
- Zeke Cohen, city councilmember from the 1st district (2016–present)

==== Eliminated in primary ====
- Nick Mosby, incumbent city council president
- Shannon Sneed, former city councilmember (2016–2020) and candidate for city council president in 2020

==== Endorsements ====
Zeke Cohen

State legislators

- Cory McCray, state senator from the 45th district (2019–present)

Local officials

- Ivan Bates, Baltimore State's Attorney (2022–present)
- Bill Henry, comptroller of Baltimore (2020–present)

Labor unions

- AFSCME Council 3
- Baltimore-D.C. Metro Building Trades Council
- Baltimore Teachers Union
- Metropolitan Baltimore AFL-CIO

Organizations

- Bikemore
- CASA in Action
- Jews United For Justice Campaign Fund
- Maryland Sierra Club
Nick Mosby

State legislators

- Regina T. Boyce, state delegate from the 43rd district (2019–present)
- Antonio Hayes, state senator from the 40th district (2019–present)
- Malcolm Ruff, state delegate from the 41st district (2023–present)
- Stephanie M. Smith, state delegate from the 45th district (2019–present)

Local officials

- Eric Costello, city councilmember from the 11th district (2014–present)
- Jack Young, former mayor of Baltimore (2019–2020)

Newspapers

- Baltimore Afro-American
Shannon Sneed

State legislators

- Jackie Addison, state delegate from the 45th district (2023–present)
- Joan Carter Conway, former state senator from the 43rd district (1997–2019)
- Nathaniel J. McFadden, former state senator from the 45th district (1995–2019)

Local officials

- Ashley Esposito, member of the Baltimore City Board of Education

Labor unions

- Amalgamated Transit Union

==== Polling ====
Poll source	Date(s) administered	Sample size (Note: Key: A – all adults RV – registered voters LV – likely voters V – unclear)	Margin of error	Zeke Cohen	Nick Mosby	Shannon Sneed	Other	Undecided
OpinionWorks (Note: Poll sponsored by The Baltimore Sun and WBFF)	April 7–11, 2024	508 (LV)	± 4.3%	40%	21%	17%	3%	19%
Goucher College (Note: Poll sponsored by The Baltimore Banner)	April 3–7, 2024	508 (LV)	± 4.3%	27%	23%	17%	14%	20%
Global Strategy Group (Note: Poll sponsored by Zeke Cohen's campaign)	February 15–20, 2024	400 (LV)	± 4.3%	31%	22%	18%	5%	24%
	October 20, 2023	Shannon Sneed enters the race						
Goucher College	September 19–23, 2023	537 (RV)	± 4.2%	30%	17%	–	34%	18%
Global Strategy Group	May 31 – June 1, 2023	702 (LV)	± 3.7%	40%	24%	–	–	18%

==== Results ====
Results of the city council presidential Democratic primary election by precinct Cohen: 30–40%; 40–50%; 50–60%; 60–70%; 70–80%; 80–90%; Sneed: 30–40%; 40–50%; 50–60%; Mosby: 30–40%; 40–50%; 50–60%; Tie 30–40% No data

Democratic primary results
Party	Candidate	Votes	%
Democratic	Zeke Cohen	46,232	50.92%
Democratic	Shannon Sneed	23,451	25.83%
Democratic	Nick Mosby (incumbent)	21,116	23.26%
Total votes		90,799	100.00%

=== Republican primary ===
==== Nominee ====
- Emmanuel Digman, perennial candidate

==== Results ====
Republican primary results
Party	Candidate	Votes	%
Republican	Emmanuel Digman	2,888	100.00%
Total votes		2,888	100.00%

=== General election ===
==== Results ====
Baltimore City Council presidential election, 2024
Party	Candidate	Votes	%
Democratic	Zeke Cohen	193,730	88.95%
Republican	Emmanuel Digman	23,196	10.65%
Write-in		866	0.40%
Total votes		217,792	100.00%

== District 1 ==
=== Democratic primary ===
==== Nominee ====
- Mark Parker, pastor

==== Eliminated in primary ====
- Liam Davis, Baltimore City Department of Transportation legislative affairs manager
- Joseph Koehler, accountant

==== Declined ====
- Zeke Cohen, incumbent city councilmember (ran for city council president, endorsed Parker)

==== Endorsements ====
Liam Davis

Local officials

- Mark Conway, city councilmember from the 4th district (2020–present)
- Eric Costello, city councilmember from the 11th district (2014–present)
- Antonio Glover, city councilmember from the 13th district (2020–present)
- Danielle McCray, city councilmember from the 2nd district (2019–present)
- Sharon Green Middleton, vice president of the Baltimore City Council (2016–present) from the 6th district (2007–present)
- Isaac "Yitzy" Schleifer, city councilmember from the 5th district (2016–present)
- Robert Stokes Sr., city councilmember from the 12th district (2016–present)

Labor unions

- International Association of Fire Fighters Local 734
Joseph Koehler

Organizations

- Run for Something
Mark Parker

State legislators

- Luke Clippinger, state delegate from the 46th district (2011–present)
- Carolyn J. Krysiak, former state delegate from the 46th district (1991–2011)

Local officials

- Zeke Cohen, city councilmember from the 1st district (2016–present)
- Bill Henry, comptroller of Baltimore (2020–present)

Labor unions

- Baltimore Teachers Union

Organizations

- CASA in Action
- Clean Water Action
- Jews United For Justice Campaign Fund
- Maryland Sierra Club
Declined to endorse

Labor unions

- Metropolitan Baltimore AFL-CIO

==== Results ====
Democratic primary results
Party	Candidate	Votes	%
Democratic	Mark Parker	2,780	52.58%
Democratic	Liam Davis	1,888	37.71%
Democratic	Joseph Koehler	619	11.71%
Total votes		2,888	100.00%

=== General election ===
==== Results ====
Baltimore City Council District 1 election, 2024
Party	Candidate	Votes	%
Democratic	Mark Parker	14,113	97.95%
Write-in		296	2.05%
Total votes		14,409	100.00%

== District 2 ==
=== Democratic primary ===
==== Nominee ====
- Danielle McCray, incumbent city councilmember

==== Eliminated in primary ====
- India Carter

==== Endorsements ====
Danielle McCray

Labor unions

- Metropolitan Baltimore AFL-CIO

==== Results ====
Democratic primary results
Party	Candidate	Votes	%
Democratic	Danielle McCray (incumbent)	4,337	79.62%
Democratic	India Carter	1,110	20.38%
Total votes		5,447	100.00%

=== Republican primary ===
==== Nominee ====
- Andy Zipay, social worker

==== Results ====
Republican primary results
Party	Candidate	Votes	%
Republican	Andy Zipay	215	100.00%
Total votes		215	100.00%

=== General election ===
==== Results ====
Baltimore City Council District 2 election, 2024
Party	Candidate	Votes	%
Democratic	Danielle McCray (incumbent)	12,524	87.53%
Republican	Andy Zipay	1,739	12.15%
Write-in		45	0.31%
Total votes		14,308	100.00%

== District 3 ==
=== Democratic primary ===
==== Nominee ====
- Ryan Dorsey, incumbent city councilmember

==== Eliminated in primary ====
- Marques Dent, U.S. Air Force veteran
- Margo Bruner-Settles, social worker

==== Endorsements ====
Ryan Dorsey

Labor unions

- 1199SEIU United Healthcare Workers East
- AFSCME Council 3
- International Association of Fire Fighters Local 734
- Metropolitan Baltimore AFL-CIO
- UNITE HERE Local 7

Organizations

- Bikemore
- CASA in Action
- Jews United For Justice Campaign Fund
- Maryland Sierra Club

==== Results ====
Democratic primary results
Party	Candidate	Votes	%
Democratic	Ryan Dorsey (incumbent)	5,296	64.90%
Democratic	Margo Bruner-Settles	2,089	25.60%
Democratic	Marques Dent	775	9.50%
Total votes		8,160	100.00%

=== General election ===
==== Results ====
Baltimore City Council District 3 election, 2024
Party	Candidate	Votes	%
Democratic	Ryan Dorsey (incumbent)	15,691	96.13%
Write-in		631	3.87%
Total votes		16,322	100.00%

== District 4 ==
=== Democratic primary ===
==== Nominee ====
- Mark Conway, incumbent city councilmember

==== Endorsements ====
Mark Conway

Organizations

- CASA in Action
- Maryland Sierra Club
Declined to endorse

Labor unions

- Metropolitan Baltimore AFL-CIO

==== Results ====
Democratic primary results
Party	Candidate	Votes	%
Democratic	Mark Conway (incumbent)	6,984	100.00%
Total votes		6,984	100.00%

=== General election ===
==== Results ====
Baltimore City Council District 4 election, 2024
Party	Candidate	Votes	%
Democratic	Mark Conway (incumbent)	16,533	99.01%
Write-in		166	0.99%
Total votes		16,699	100.00%

== District 5 ==
=== Democratic primary ===
==== Nominee ====
- Isaac "Yitzy" Schleifer, incumbent city councilmember

==== Eliminated in primary ====
- Marvin Briscoe

==== Endorsements ====
Isaac "Yitzy" Schleifer

Labor unions

- AFSCME Council 3
- Metropolitan Baltimore AFL-CIO

==== Results ====
Democratic primary results
Party	Candidate	Votes	%
Democratic	Isaac "Yitzy" Schleifer (incumbent)	6,229	76.18%
Democratic	Marvin Briscoe	1,948	23.82%
Total votes		8,177	100.00%

=== General election ===
==== Results ====
Baltimore City Council District 5 election, 2024
Party	Candidate	Votes	%
Democratic	Isaac "Yitzy" Schleifer (incumbent)	16,239	98.40%
Write-in		264	1.60%
Total votes		16,503	100.00%

== District 6 ==
=== Democratic primary ===
==== Nominee ====
- Sharon Green Middleton, incumbent city councilmember

==== Eliminated in primary ====
- Robyn Christian, retired investigator
- Steven Johnson, former president of the Pimlico Terrace Neighborhood Association

==== Endorsements ====
Sharon Green Middleton

Labor unions

- 1199SEIU United Healthcare Workers East
- AFSCME Council 3
- Metropolitan Baltimore AFL-CIO

Organizations

- CASA in Action
- Jews United For Justice Campaign Fund
- Maryland Sierra Club

==== Results ====
Democratic primary results
Party	Candidate	Votes	%
Democratic	Sharon Green Middleton (incumbent)	4,160	61.96%
Democratic	Steven T. Johnson	1,710	25.47%
Democratic	Robyn A. Christian	844	12.57%
Total votes		8,160	100.00%

=== Republican primary ===
==== Nominee, disqualified in general election ====
- Ronday Wilson

==== Results ====
Republican primary results
Party	Candidate	Votes	%
Republican	Ronday Wilson	136	100.00%
Total votes		136	100.00%

=== General election ===
==== Results ====
Baltimore City Council District 6 election, 2024
Party	Candidate	Votes	%
Democratic	Sharon Green Middleton (incumbent)	13,694	98.47%
Write-in		213	1.53%
Total votes		13,907	100.00%

== District 7 ==
=== Democratic primary ===
==== Nominee ====
- James Torrence, incumbent city councilmember

==== Eliminated in primary ====
- Tori Rose

==== Withdrawn ====
- Kelli Bigelow

==== Endorsements ====
James Torrence

Labor unions

- Metropolitan Baltimore AFL-CIO

Organizations

- Jews United For Justice Campaign Fund
- Maryland Sierra Club

==== Results ====
Democratic primary results
Party	Candidate	Votes	%
Democratic	James Torrence (incumbent)	3,781	59.86%
Democratic	Tori Rose	2,535	40.14%
Total votes		6,316	100.00%

=== Republican primary ===
==== Nominee ====
- Christopher Anderson, nominee for city council president in 2020 and SD-40 in 2022

==== Results ====
Democratic primary results
Party	Candidate	Votes	%
Republican	Christopher Anderson	141	100.00%
Total votes		141	100.00%

=== General election ===
==== Results ====
Baltimore City Council District 7 election, 2024
Party	Candidate	Votes	%
Democratic	James Torrence (incumbent)	13,595	91.13%
Republican	Christopher Anderson	1,257	8.43%
Write-in		66	0.44%
Total votes		14,918	100.00%

== District 8 ==
=== Democratic primary ===
==== Nominee ====
- Paris Gray, community outreach coordinator

==== Eliminated in primary ====
- Bilal Ali, former state delegate from the 41st district (2017–2019)
- Christian Allen, video and film technician
- Jeffery Allen
- Joyous Jones

==== Declined ====
- Kristerfer Burnett, incumbent city councilmember (endorsed Gray)

==== Endorsements ====
Paris Gray

Local officials

- Kristerfer Burnett, city councilmember from the 8th district (2016–2024)

Labor unions

- AFSCME Council 3
- Metropolitan Baltimore AFL-CIO

Organizations

- Bikemore
- CASA in Action
- Jews United For Justice Campaign Fund
- Maryland Sierra Club

==== Results ====
Democratic primary results
Party	Candidate	Votes	%
Democratic	Paris Gray	2,669	41.41%
Democratic	Bilal Ali	2,431	37.71%
Democratic	Christian Allen	525	8.14%
Democratic	Joyous Jones	465	7.21%
Democratic	Jeffery Allen	356	5.52%
Total votes		6,446	100.00%

=== General election ===
==== Results ====
Baltimore City Council District 8 election, 2024
Party	Candidate	Votes	%
Democratic	Paris Gray	14,473	99.16%
Write-in		123	0.84%
Total votes		14,596	100.00%

== District 9 ==
=== Democratic primary ===
==== Nominee ====
- John Bullock, incumbent city councilmember

==== Eliminated in primary ====
- Sonia Eaddy, community activist
- Matthew Johnson
- Venroy July

==== Endorsements ====
John Bullock

Labor unions

- AFSCME Council 3
- Metropolitan Baltimore AFL-CIO

Organizations

- Bikemore
- CASA in Action
- Maryland Sierra Club

==== Results ====
Democratic primary results
Party	Candidate	Votes	%
Democratic	John Bullock (incumbent)	2,188	54.15%
Democratic	Sonia Eaddy	957	23.68%
Democratic	Venroy July	670	16.58%
Democratic	Matthew Johnson	226	5.59%
Total votes		4,041	100.00%

=== General election ===
==== Results ====
Baltimore City Council District 9 election, 2024
Party	Candidate	Votes	%
Democratic	John T. Bullock (incumbent)	9,738	97.62%
Write-in		237	2.38%
Total votes		9,975	100.00%

== District 10 ==
=== Democratic primary ===
==== Nominee ====
- Phylicia Porter, incumbent city councilmember

==== Eliminated in primary ====
- Richard Parker

==== Endorsements ====
Phylicia Porter

Labor unions

- 1199SEIU United Healthcare Workers East
- Metropolitan Baltimore AFL-CIO
- AFSCME Council 3

Organizations

- CASA in Action
- Clean Water Action
- Jews United For Justice Campaign Fund
- Maryland Sierra Club

==== Results ====
Democratic primary results
Party	Candidate	Votes	%
Democratic	Phylicia Porter (incumbent)	2,161	79.65%
Democratic	Richard Parker	552	20.35%
Total votes		2,713	100.00%

=== General election ===
==== Results ====
Baltimore City Council District 10 election, 2024
Party	Candidate	Votes	%
Democratic	Phylicia Porter (incumbent)	8,584	97.53%
Write-in		217	2.47%
Total votes		8,801	100.00%

== District 11 ==
=== Democratic primary ===
==== Nominee ====
- Zac Blanchard, U.S. Marine Corps veteran and president of the Federal Hill Neighborhood Association

==== Eliminated in primary ====
- Eric Costello, incumbent city councilmember

==== Endorsements ====
Zac Blanchard

Local officials

- Ashley Esposito, member of the Baltimore City Board of Education

Organizations

- Bikemore
- Maryland Sierra Club
- Jews United For Justice Campaign Fund
- VoteVets.org
Eric Costello

Statewide officials

- Brooke Lierman, comptroller of Maryland (2023–present)
- Wes Moore, governor of Maryland (2023–present)

Local officials

- Sam Cogen, sheriff of Baltimore (2022–present)
- Ivan Bates, Baltimore State's Attorney (2022–present)
Declined to endorse

Labor unions

- Metropolitan Baltimore AFL-CIO

==== Results ====
Democratic primary results
Party	Candidate	Votes	%
Democratic	Zac Blanchard	3,467	50.35%
Democratic	Eric Costello (incumbent)	3,419	49.65%
Total votes		6,886	100.00%

=== General election ===
==== Results ====
Baltimore City Council District 11 election, 2024
Party	Candidate	Votes	%
Democratic	Zac Blanchard	15,932	97.86%
Write-in		349	2.14%
Total votes		16,281	100.00%

== District 12 ==
=== Democratic primary ===
==== Nominee ====
- Jermaine Jones, former president of the Metropolitan Baltimore Council AFL-CIO

==== Eliminated in primary ====
- Robert Stokes Sr., incumbent city councilmember

==== Endorsements ====
Jermaine Jones
- AFSCME Council 3
- Laborers' Union Philadelphia/Baltimore/Washington district council
- Metropolitan Baltimore Council AFL-CIO

Organizations

- CASA in Action
- Jews United For Justice Campaign Fund
- Maryland Sierra Club
Robert Stokes Sr.

Local officials

- Sam Cogen, sheriff of Baltimore (2022–present)
- Eric Costello, city councilmember from the 11th district (2014–present)

Labor unions

- International Association of Fire Fighters Local 964

==== Results ====
Democratic primary results
Party	Candidate	Votes	%
Democratic	Jermaine Jones	2,678	53.70%
Democratic	Robert Stokes Sr. (incumbent)	2,309	46.30%
Total votes		4,987	100.00%

=== General election ===
==== Results ====
Baltimore City Council District 12 election, 2024
Party	Candidate	Votes	%
Democratic	Jermaine Jones	11,739	99.00%
Write-in		118	1.00%
Total votes		11,857	100.00%

== District 13 ==
=== Democratic primary ===
==== Nominee ====
- Antonio Glover, incumbent city councilmember

==== Eliminated in primary ====
- Walker Gladden, 3rd

==== Endorsements ====
Antonio Glover

Labor unions

- 1199SEIU United Healthcare Workers East

==== Results ====
Democratic primary results
Party	Candidate	Votes	%
Democratic	Antonio Glover (incumbent)	3,856	81.73%
Democratic	Walker Gladden, 3rd	862	18.27%
Total votes		4,718	100.00%

=== Republican primary ===
==== Nominee ====
- Alexander Artis

==== Results ====
Republican primary results
Party	Candidate	Votes	%
Republican	Alexander Artis	144	100.00%
Total votes		144	100.00%

=== General election ===
==== Results ====
Baltimore City Council District 13 election, 2024
Party	Candidate	Votes	%
Democratic	Antonio Glover (incumbent)	11,829	90.17%
Republican	Alexander Artis	1,220	9.30%
Write-in		70	0.53%
Total votes		13,119	100.00%

== District 14 ==
=== Democratic primary ===
==== Nominee ====
- Odette Ramos, incumbent city councilmember

==== Endorsements ====
Odette Ramos

Labor unions

- AFSCME Council 3
- International Association of Fire Fighters Local 734 and 964
- Metropolitan Baltimore AFL-CIO
- SEIU 32BJ

Organizations

- CASA in Action
- Jews United For Justice Campaign Fund
- Maryland Sierra Club

==== Results ====
Democratic primary results
Party	Candidate	Votes	%
Democratic	Odette Ramos (incumbent)	7,873	100.00%
Total votes		7,873	100.00%

=== Third-party and independent candidates ===
==== Candidates ====
- Renaud Deaundre Brown (Green), nominee for HD-43A in 2022

=== General election ===
==== Results ====
Baltimore City Council District 14 election, 2024
Party	Candidate	Votes	%
Democratic	Odette Ramos (incumbent)	15,734	90.77%
Green	Renaud Deaundre Brown	1,521	8.77%
Write-in		79	0.46%
Total votes		17,334	100.00%

== Notes ==
Partisan clients
