= Mark Conway (politician) =

American politician (born 1989)

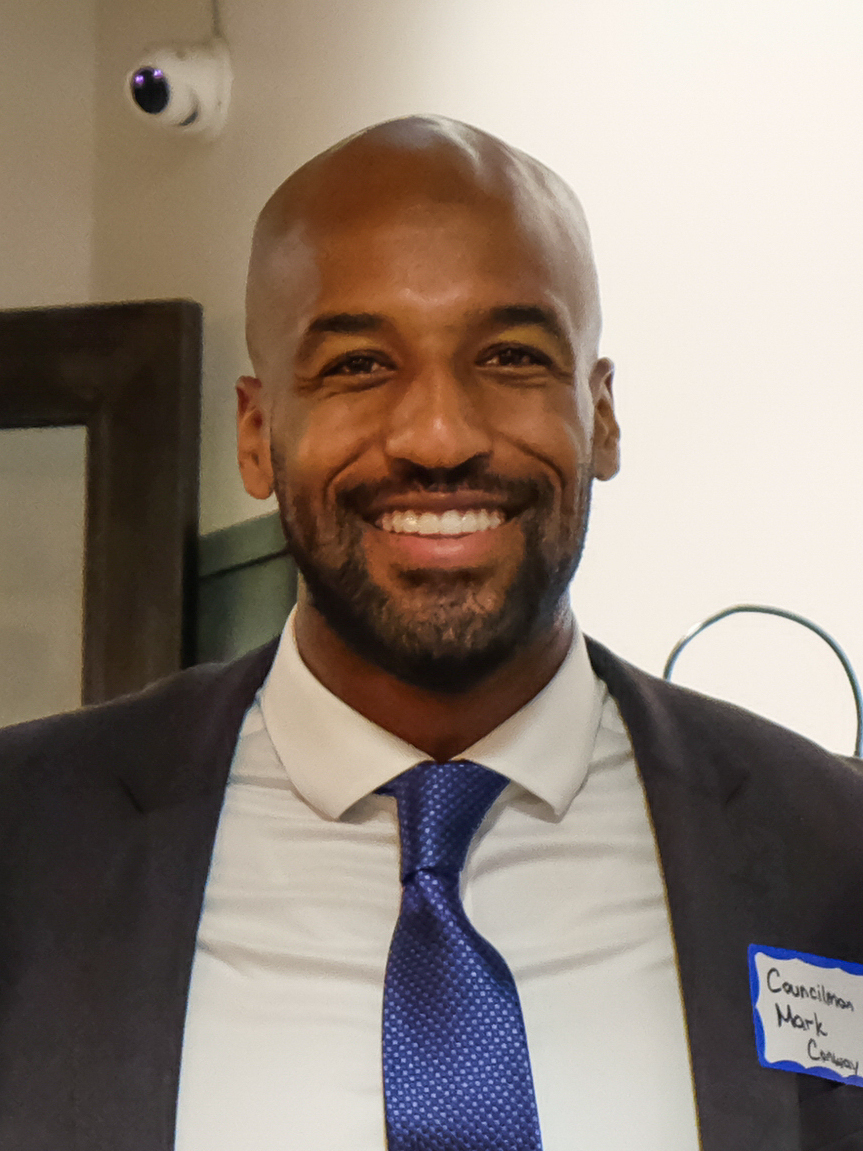
- Conway in 2022

Member of the Baltimore City Council from the 4th district
- Incumbent
- Assumed office December 10, 2020
- Preceded by: Bill Henry

Personal details
- Born: 1989 (age 36–37) New York City, New York, U.S.
- Party: Democratic
- Education: University of Maryland, College Park (BA, MPP)

Mark S. Conway Jr. (born 1989) is an American nonprofit executive and politician serving as a member of the Baltimore City Council from the 4th district since December 2020. A Democrat, Conway was first elected to the role in 2020 then re-elected unopposed in 2024.

Prior to running for elected office, Conway was an executive vice president at the Chesapeake Conservancy, executive director of the Baltimore Tree Trust, and deputy director of CitiStat within the Office of the Mayor of Baltimore. He ran for the U.S. House of Representatives in Maryland's 7th congressional district election in 2026, losing to incumbent Kweisi Mfume in the primary election with 24.5% of the vote.

== Early life and education ==
Conway was born in 1989 in The Bronx, New York City, and raised there by parents who worked in law enforcement. He graduated from the University of Maryland, College Park with a Bachelor of Arts in government, politics and philosophy in 2010 as well as a Master of Public Policy in 2013. While an undergraduate, Conway participated in the College Park Scholars Public Leadership Program and the Rawlings Undergraduate Leadership Fellows Program.

== Career ==
While at graduate school, Conway worked part-time at the U.S. Environmental Protection Agency. Upon graduating, he worked as a CitiStat analyst in the Office of the Mayor of Baltimore from 2012 to 2014 before being promoted deputy director of the office. Starting in April 2017, he served as executive director of nonprofit the Baltimore Tree Trust until being named executive vice president of programs and external affairs at the Chesapeake Conservancy in July 2020.

== Baltimore City Council ==
=== Tenure ===
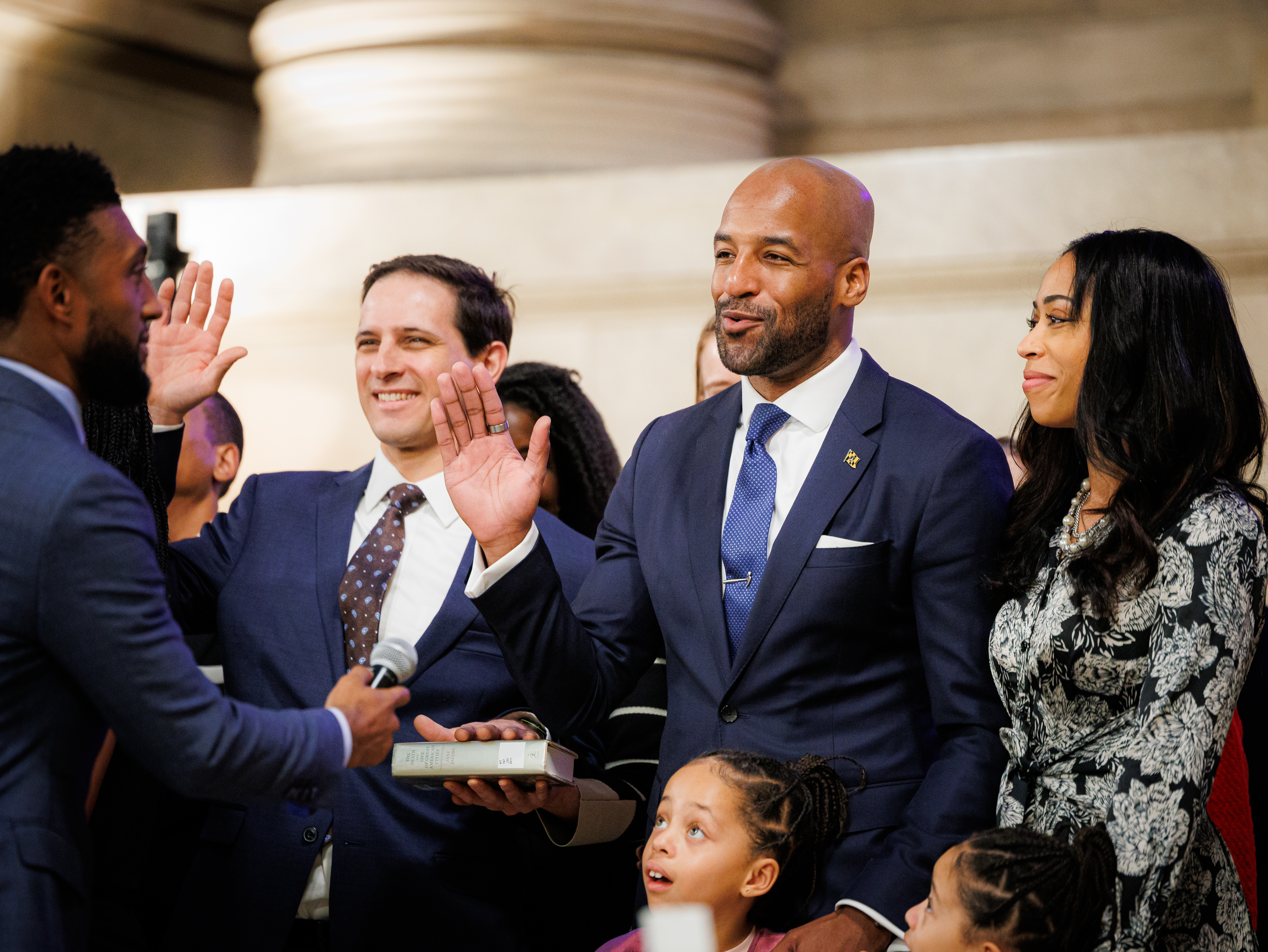
Conway and his family take the oath of office in December 2024.

Conway was first elected to the Baltimore City Council in 2020, winning a crowded primary election by 200 votes to succeed 'Bill' William B. Henry II, who retired to successfully run for Comptroller of Baltimore. He was re-elected unopposed in the primary and general election in 2024.

According to September 2024 reporting from The Baltimore Sun, Conway is one of the council’s least active sponsors of legislation having sponsored or co-sponsored 64 ordinances— 37 of which were enacted, six of which were withdrawn, and 21 that were still in progress at the time— since 2020.

=== Policy positions ===
==== Inspector general ====
In May 2026, Conway disagreed with mayor Brandon Scott's proposal to have the city's inspector general Isabel Mercedes Cumming report directly to the city law department under the mayor's office, which Conway said would threaten the independence of the watchdog role. He introduced a ballot question to have voters decide if the inspector general should be a "custodian" with direct access to city records, but Scott's lawyers stated this would break the Maryland Public Information Act.

==== Energy and environment ====
In October 2021, mayor Brandon Scott signed Conway's legislation directing the city's three public pension funds to divest from fossil fuels within five years. A month later in November 2021, Wes Moore— whom Conway had endorsed in the 2022 Maryland gubernatorial election— named Conway his "personal climate hero" in an interview. Conway supports the Healthy Harbor campaign to clean up Baltimore's Inner Harbor and make it swimmable.

After sending a letter to the Scott administration questioning whether the city would renew its conduit system agreement with Baltimore Gas and Electric following numerous fires within the system, the city ultimately announced it would not renew the agreement in June 2026.

==== Public safety ====
In July 2022, Conway endorsed Sam Cogen for Baltimore City Sheriff.

As chair of the council's Public Safety Committee, Conway proposed treatment for drug users and jobs for drug dealers, further demanding the city provide a plan to dismantle open air drug markets in April 2026. He was removed as chair of the committee following restructuring by Council President Zeke Cohen in September 2026, a move which Conway characterized as retaliation for his disagreements with other councilmembers on issues such as on the inspector general's role.

=== 2026 congressional campaign ===
In October 2025, Conway announced his campaign for the U.S. House of Representatives in the 2026 election, challenging incumbent Democrat Kweisi Mfume in MD-07. Conway criticized Mfume for receiving donations of nearly $35,000 from AIPAC as well as thousands from defense contractors such as Lockheed Martin and Northrop Grumman.

In April 2026, Conway challenged Mfume to a debate which Mfume declined, calling Conway a "showhorse" who had lied about Mfume accepting donations from corporate political action committees. At a May 2026 candidate forum hosted by the local advocacy groups and the SEIU, Conway and Mfume notably clashed over Mfume's age at 77 years old and support for American military aid to Israel.

In the Democratic primary election on June 23, 2026, Conway lost to Mfume by a wide margin with 24.5% to Mfume's 70.1% of the vote.

== Personal life ==
Conway resides in Guilford, Baltimore.

== Electoral history ==
=== 2020 ===
2020 Baltimore City Council election District 4 Democratic primary election results
Party	Candidate	Votes	%
Democratic	Mark Conway	3,405	28.20%
Democratic	Logan Endow	3,184	26.30%
Democratic	Nicole Harris-Crest	2,428	20.10%
Democratic	Zac Dingle	1,106	9.10%
Democratic	Angie Winder	867	7.20%
Democratic	Anson Asaka	349	2.90%
Democratic	William Broaddus	311	2.60%
Democratic	V. Lee Brady	123	1.00%
Democratic	Tim Goldsby, Jr.	122	1.00%
Total votes		11,895	100.00%

2020 Baltimore City Council election District 4 general election results
Party	Candidate	Votes	%
Democratic	Mark Conway	16,958	98.90%
Write-in		186	0.99%
Total votes		17,144	100.00%

=== 2024 ===
2024 Baltimore City Council election District 4 Democratic primary election results
Party	Candidate	Votes	%
Democratic	Mark Conway (incumbent)	6,984	100.00%
Total votes		6,984	100.00%

2024 Baltimore City Council election District 4 general election results
Party	Candidate	Votes	%
Democratic	Mark Conway (incumbent)	16,533	99.01%
Write-in		166	0.99%
Total votes		16,699	100.00%
