= Sharon Green Middleton =

American politician

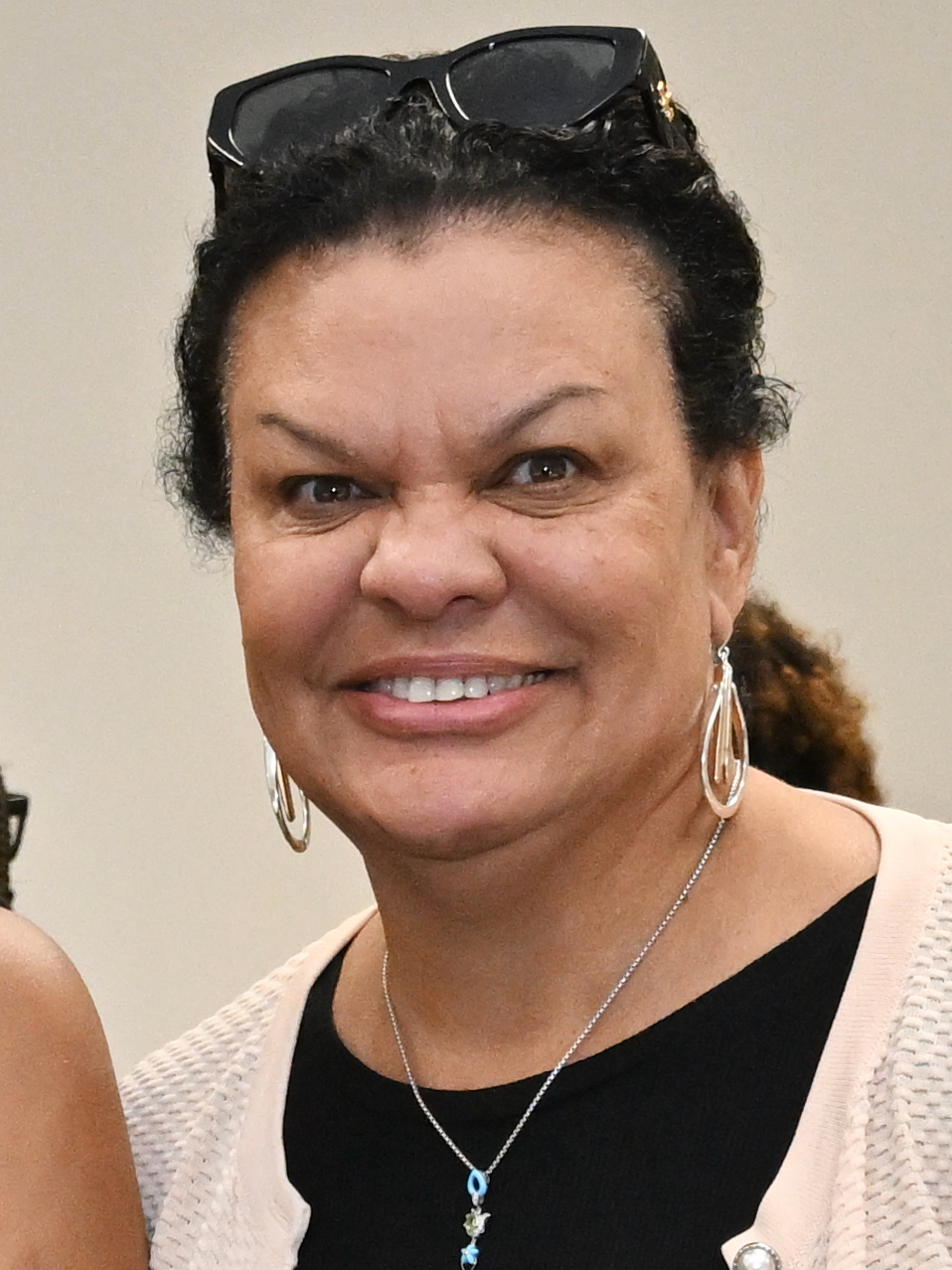
- Middleton in 2023

Vice President of the Baltimore City Council
- Incumbent
- Assumed office December 8, 2016
- President: Bernard C. Young; Brandon Scott; Nick Mosby; Zeke Cohen
- Preceded by: Edward Reisinger

Member of the Baltimore City Council from the 6th district
- Incumbent
- Assumed office February 26, 2007
- Preceded by: Stephanie Rawlings-Blake

Personal details
- Born: Sharon Green; May 1, 1954 (age 72) Baltimore, Maryland, U.S.
- Spouse: Glenard Middleton (m. 1980; died 2024)
- Children: 1, and 1 stepchild
- Education: Morgan State University (BA)

Sharon Green Middleton (née Green; May 1, 1954) is an American politician who has been a member of the Baltimore City Council since 2007 and its vice president since 2016. A member of the Democratic Party, she briefly served as acting president of the Baltimore City Council following Bernard C. Young's ascension to mayor following the resignation of Catherine Pugh.

== Early life and education ==
Middleton was born in Baltimore on May 1, 1954 to mother Martha V. Green (née Martha Virginia McDaniel), a retired telephone operator and day care worker, and father Kennedy Carl Green, a steelworker. She graduated from Morgan State University with a Bachelor of Arts degree in secondary education in 1976, afterwards working as a teacher for Baltimore County Public Schools for two decades, afterwards working as a specialist for the Maryland State Department of Education and the Maryland Department of Labor until her retirement in 2006.

== Baltimore City Council ==
In February 2007, after Stephanie Rawlings-Blake was appointed president of the Baltimore City Council following the election of Sheila Dixon as mayor of Baltimore, Middleton applied to serve the remainder of Rawlings-Blake's term on the Baltimore City Council. The Baltimore City Democratic Central Committee unanimously voted to nominate her to the seat. Middleton's nomination was confirmed by the Baltimore City Council and she was sworn in on February 26, 2007. She ran for and was elected to a full four-term in 2007.

Following the resignation of Baltimore mayor Catherine Pugh in April 2019, Middleton temporarily became the acting president of the Baltimore City Council. She served in this position until May 6, 2019, when the Baltimore City Council voted unanimously to elect Brandon Scott as its new president.

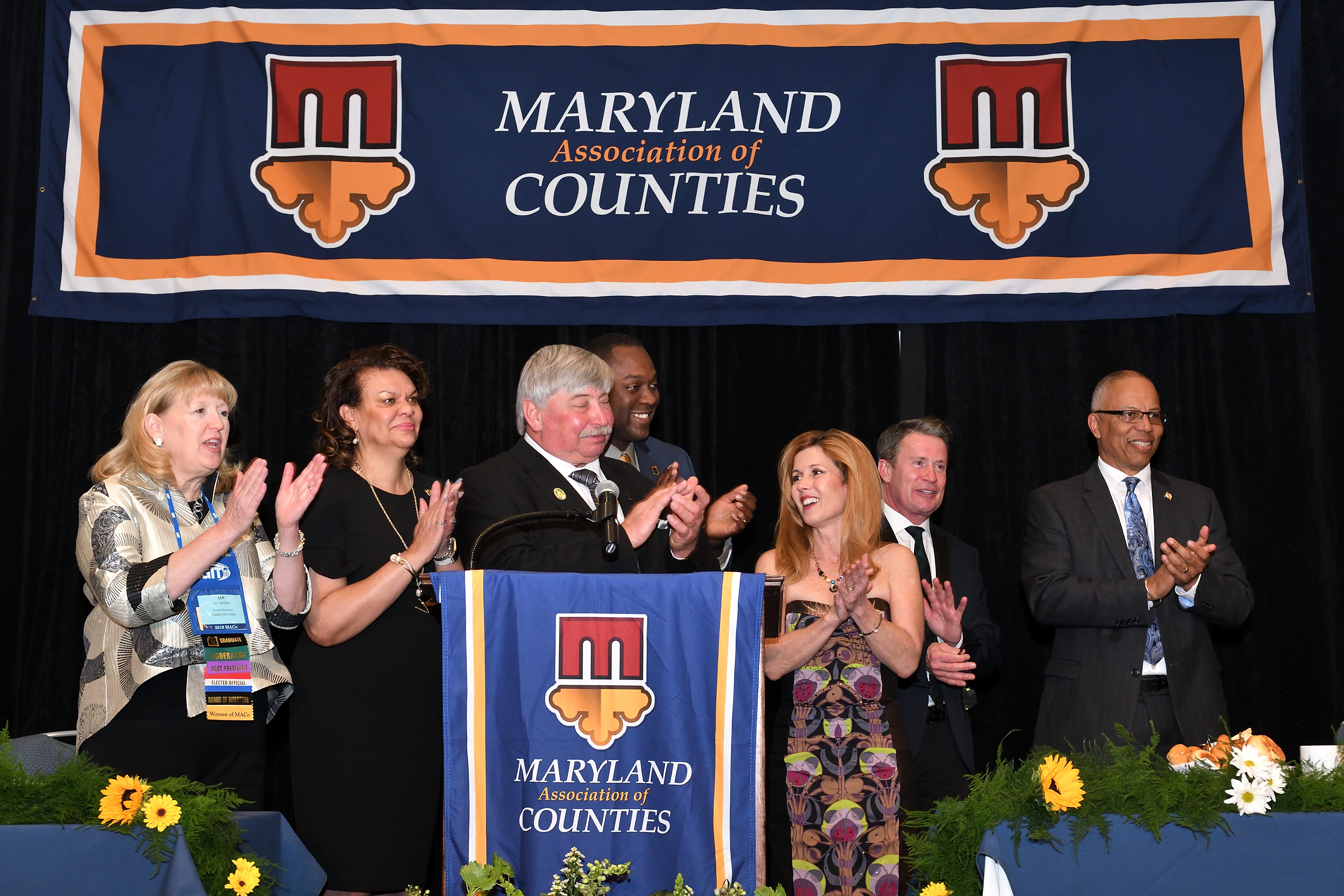
Middleton (center left) at the Maryland Association of Counties winter conference, 2019

In December 2019, Middleton was elected president of the Maryland Association of Counties, becoming the lobbying group's first African American from Baltimore to hold the position.

== Personal life ==
Middleton was married to Glenard S. Middleton Sr., who was the leader of American Federation of State, County and Municipal Employees (AFSCME) Local 67 until its merger with AFSCME Local 3 in 2023. They were married from 1980 until his death on November 7, 2024. Together, they had a son and a stepdaughter, both of whom work in Baltimore city government as of November 2023.

== Political positions ==
=== Crime and policing ===
In January 2014, Middleton said she supported a proposal that would require one-third of Baltimore's residential liquor stores to close within two years, claiming that it would help fight crime in the city.

In September 2014, following a Baltimore Sun investigation that found that the city of Baltimore had covered the costs for more than 100 police brutality settlements or verdicts since 2011, Middleton called on the Baltimore Police Department to improve its training programs to help officers deal with different personalities on the streets. In September 2019, she opposed a bill that would end the use of "gag orders" in city police misconduct cases.

In May 2022, amid an increase in violent crime in Baltimore, Middleton called for an increase in neighborhood patrolling and questioned the effectiveness of community violence intervention programs, including the Mayor's Office of Neighborhood Safety and Engagement (MONSE).

=== Environment ===
In January 2014, Middleton voted against a bill implementing a 10-cent fee on paper and plastic bags in stores, saying that she instead wanted the city to develop a comprehensive litter control program.

=== Housing and development ===
In September 2013, Middleton voted against a proposal to convert Baltimore's old Exelon chemical plant to a waterfront development, citing concerns about safety and criticisms toward subsidies provided to the project.

In September 2016, Middleton voted against a bill that would have required developers receiving tax incentives to build affordable housing units.

In February 2018, Middleton voted for a bill to provide $4 million in tax breaks toward the redevelopment of the Northwood Plaza shopping center.

In June 2019, following an NAACP study that uncovered disparities in water affordability among African Americans in Baltimore, Middleton introduced a bill to reform the process for disputing city water bills and provide financial assistance to certain city residents for water and sewer bills.

In January 2021, Middleton introduced a bill that would require landlords with 10 or more units to offer tenants security deposit payment alternatives. After the bill was vetoed by Mayor Brandon Scott, she introduced another bill to create a program providing grants to low-income residents to pay their security deposits, which passed and was signed into law by Mayor Scott.

In January 2022, Middleton proposed using American Rescue Plan Act of 2021 funding to support Baltimore's existing housing programs, especially the weatherization assistance program, which she claimed weren't "getting the job done".

=== Labor ===
In October 2007, amid a dispute between the Baltimore Teachers Union and Baltimore City Public Schools, Middleton introduced a nonbinding resolution supporting the union.

In March 2017, Middleton voted for a bill to raise the minimum wage in Baltimore to $15 an hour.

In December 2020, Middleton voted for a bill to provide job protections to hospitality workers laid off during the COVID-19 pandemic. After the bill was vetoed by Mayor Young, she voted against overriding the mayor's veto.

=== Social issues ===
In July 2020, Middleton voted against a bill creating a city-wide referendum on placing a three-term limit on city elected officials.

=== Transportation ===
In March 2019, Middleton said she supported the removal of bike lanes along Roland Avenue, saying that her constituents were tired of "experiments". In January 2024, she called for a hearing on the city's bike infrastructure, citing community concerns over bike lanes in certain parts of the city. At the hearing, Middleton claimed that bike lanes were "unfair" to families with cars.

== Electoral history ==
Baltimore City Council District 6 Democratic primary election, 2007
Party	Candidate	Votes	%
Democratic	Sharon Green Middleton (incumbent)	3,948	54.0
Democratic	Liz Smith	2,576	35.2
Democratic	Ramona Moore Baker	417	5.7
Democratic	Deborah B. Ramsey	372	5.1

Baltimore City Council District 6 election, 2007
Party	Candidate	Votes	%
Democratic	Sharon Green Middleton (incumbent)	3,383	98.6
Write-in		47	1.4

Baltimore City Council District 6 election, 2011
Party	Candidate	Votes	%
Democratic	Sharon Green Middleton (incumbent)	3,655	98.0
Write-in		73	2.0

Baltimore City Council District 6 election, 2016
Party	Candidate	Votes	%
Democratic	Sharon Green Middleton (incumbent)	13,518	90.4
Green	Richard Thomas White Jr.	1,240	8.3
Write-in		190	1.3

Baltimore City Council District 6 election, 2020
Party	Candidate	Votes	%
Democratic	Sharon Green Middleton (incumbent)	13,247	89.9
Republican	Michelle Y. Andrews	1,421	9.6
Write-in		74	0.5
