= New York City Board of Estimate =

Former governmental agency in New York City

Board overview
- Formed: 1901
- Dissolved: 1990; 36 years ago
- Jurisdiction: New York City

Map
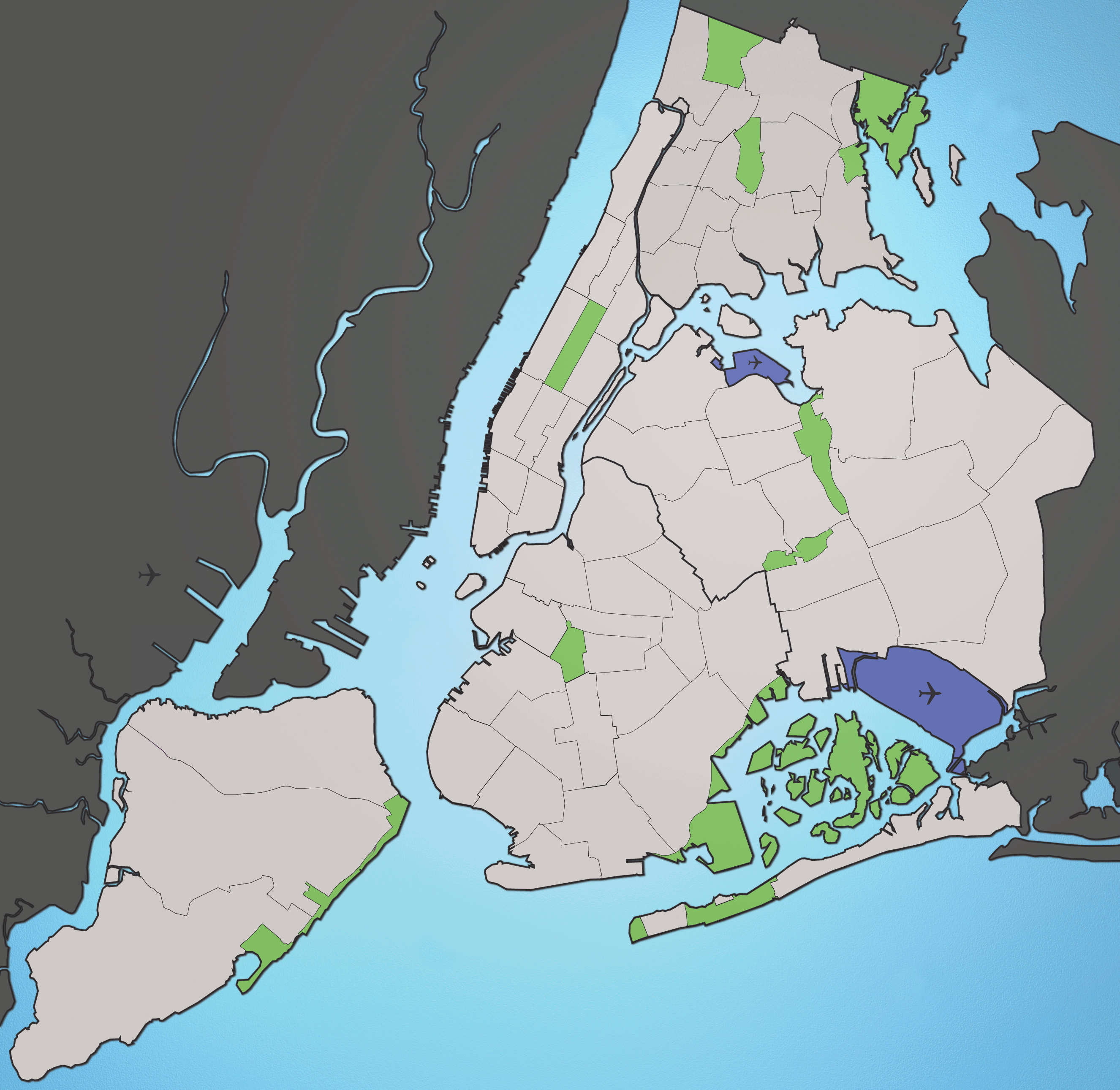

The New York City Board of Estimate was a governmental body in New York City responsible for numerous areas of municipal policy and decisions, including the city budget, land-use, contracts, franchises, and water rates. Under the amendments effective in 1901, to the charter of the then-recently-amalgamated City of Greater New York, the Board of Estimate and Apportionment was composed of eight ex officio members: the Mayor of New York City, the New York City Comptroller and the President of the New York City Board of Aldermen, each of whom had three votes; the borough presidents of Manhattan and Brooklyn, each having two votes; and the borough presidents of the Bronx, Queens, and Richmond (Staten Island), each having one vote. The 1897 charter effective on amalgamation had had a five-member Board of Estimate and Apportionment. The La Guardia Reform Charter of 1938 simplified its name and enhanced its powers.

In 1957, the Charter was amended to raise the number of votes on the Board to twenty-two. Twelve of these votes were held by the three citywide officials, and the five borough presidents were allotted two votes each.

On March 22, 1989, the Supreme Court of the United States unanimously declared in Board of Estimate of City of New York v. Morris that the Board of Estimate was unconstitutional on the grounds that Brooklyn, the city's most populous borough, had no greater effective representation on the board than Staten Island, the city's least populous borough, and that this arrangement was a violation of the Fourteenth Amendment's Equal Protection Clause pursuant to the high court's 1964 "one man, one vote" decision (Reynolds v. Sims).

In response to the Supreme Court's decision, the New York City Charter Revision Commission drew up changes to the municipal government, which were approved by 55% to 45% in a citywide referendum on election day, November 1989. A month later, the changes were approved by the U.S. Department of Justice and they were implemented as planned the following year according to the 1990 City Charter, which abolished the Board of Estimate and assigned most of its responsibilities to an enlarged New York City Council. The board was dissolved on August 31, 1990.

== See also ==
- Board of estimate
