= Bikemore =

American cycling pressure group

Bikemore is a nonprofit organization comprising a 501(c)(3) organization located in Baltimore, Maryland.

== History ==
Bikemore was founded in 2012 by a group of people that were concerned street designs were not accommodating for safe bike riding.. In late 2012, the nonprofit hired its first Executive Director, Chris Merriam, through an award of an Open Society Institute-Baltimore Community Fellowship.

Bikemore hired Liz Cornish in 2015. Cornish was on the former staff at The League of American Bicyclists as executive director.

In 2017, work was halted on a separated bike lane on Potomac Street in Southeast Baltimore because neighbors complained it could hinder emergency vehicle access. Bikemore sued the city after consultation with transportation engineers from the National Association of City Transportation Officials and emergency operations experts, leading to a temporary restraining order preventing demolition of the separated bike lane. This temporary restraining order was the first such order in the nation protecting a bike facility. The fire marshal from the Baltimore City Fire Department refused to permit existing designs to proceed, leading to subsequent heated public meetings where a firefighter assaulted a city planner and another firefighter ran a woman riding her bicycle off of the road with his pickup truck. This violence from members of the Baltimore City Fire Department, along with the fire marshal's lack of willingness to permit design of streets and new developments based on national best practices resulted in Bikemore advocating for legislation passed through Baltimore City Council to repeal the optional Appendix D of the International Fire Code and replace portions of the code with best practices from the NACTO Urban Street Design Guide. This legislation ultimately went into law without the mayor's signature, after the Baltimore City Fire Department continued to threaten bike advocates by filming videos in front of their homes and along protected bike lanes.

In 2018, Bikemore worked with District 3 Councilman Ryan Dorsey on drafting the Baltimore Complete Streets Ordinance. The ordinance creates a modal hierarchy prioritizing vulnerable road users like people walking, biking, and taking public transit over automobile-oriented street uses. It also requires investments in the city's transportation infrastructure be prioritized with a racial equity lens, the first such policy in the United States to do so. The ordinance was recognized as one of the Best Complete Streets Initiatives of 2018 by Smart Growth America.

In 2019, Bikemore was recognized as Advocacy Organization of the Year by The League of American Bicyclists.

In 2020, Bikemore's #IBikeIVote campaign, part of the 501(c)(4) organization Bikemore in Action, endorsed candidates for office for the first time. 8 of their 9 endorsed candidates won election, including both citywide endorsements: Mayor Brandon Scott and Comptroller Bill Henry. Bikemore's Executive Director Liz Cornish served as the transportation committee co-chair on Mayor Brandon Scott's transition team. In response to the pandemic, Bikemore worked with Baltimore City Council to introduce a Slow Streets program, implemented across the city to provide additional recreational space for residents trying to physically distance. Bikemore also worked as part of the SaveMDTransit coalition to halt major service cuts to Maryland Transit Administration public transit services proposed by Governor Larry Hogan and pass legislation to fund longstanding deferred maintenance needs for public transit.

In 2021, Liz Cornish departed Bikemore after 6 years as Executive Director. Jed Weeks, Bikemore's Policy Director, is serving as Interim Executive Director.
