= Board of estimate =

A board of estimate is a governing body, particularly in the United States.

The board's membership will consist of a combination of elected officials from the executive branch (e.g., the mayor or county executive) and the legislative branch (called the city council or, in some localities, the board of supervisors), and in some cases officials elected solely for the board. Its powers are usually concentrated in such areas as taxation and debt management.

== United States ==
=== Connecticut ===
Greenwich has a twelve-member Board of Estimate and Taxation that sets the town tax mill rate, among other financial duties. These officials do not serve in any other capacity.

Norwalk has six members appointed by the mayor and city council, with the mayor serving ex-officio.

=== Maryland ===
Baltimore has a Board of Estimates. The Baltimore City Board of Estimates consists of five voting members: The Mayor, the President of the City Council, the Comptroller, the city solicitor, and the Director of Public Works. The President of the City Council serves as President of the Board of Estimates, and the City Comptroller serves as Secretary to the Board. Similar to Minneapolis, it sets fiscal policy for the City by sharing power among different elected individuals.

=== Minnesota ===
In Minneapolis, the Minneapolis Board of Estimate and Taxation (BET) is a "council of government" body, where elected officials from other Boards sit to make policy that affects all the Boards. In this case, the Minneapolis Board of Estimate consists of the Mayor, the City Council president, City Council budget chair, one Park and Recreation Board commissioner, and two independently elected persons on the Board of Estimate and Taxation. The Library Board also had representation, until it was abolished in 2007. It primarily sets the maximum tax levy and debt policy for the City, various city department levies, and the Minneapolis Park and Recreation Board.

=== Missouri ===
St. Louis has a Board of Estimate and Apportionment that consists of the Mayor, the Comptroller (an elected position), and the President of the Board of Aldermen.

=== New York ===
Middletown, New York has a Board of Estimate which is made up of the Mayor, the President of the Common Council and the Chair of the Finance Committee. They oversee the finances of the City, including purchasing, contracts, debt management, setting salaries and other similar financial duties.

Mount Vernon, New York has a Board of Estimate and Contract, made up of the Mayor, Comptroller and City Council President, which oversees the City's finances.

New York City had a Board of Estimate but it was found to be unconstitutional in 1989 because each borough had one vote, making Brooklyn's vote equal to that of Staten Island, which was found to violate the 14th Amendment.

== See also ==
- New York City Board of Estimate (defunct)
