= Comptroller of Baltimore =

Public office in Baltimore, Maryland

- Flag of Baltimore

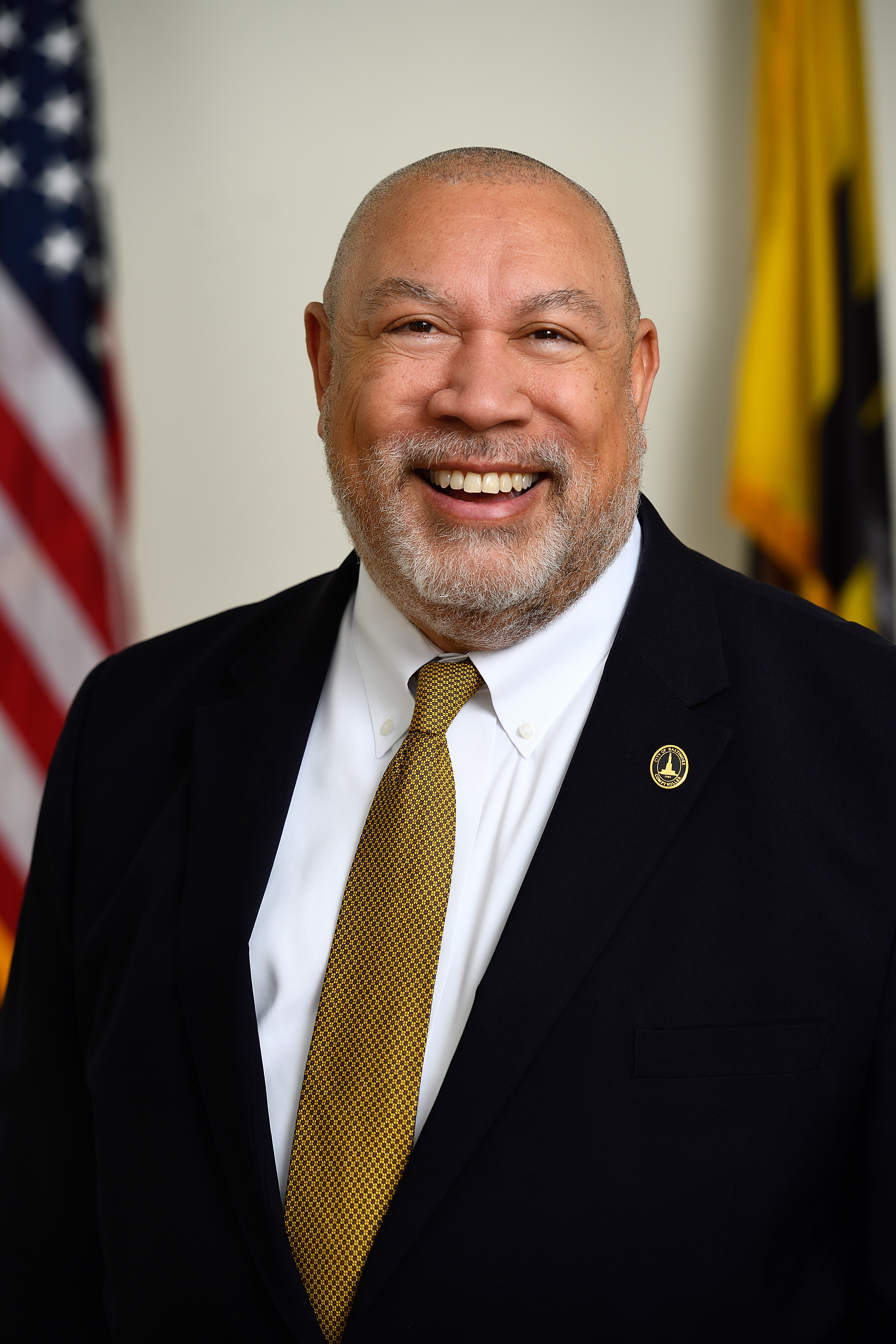
- Incumbent; Bill Henry since December 8, 2020
- Style: Mister or Madam Comptroller (informal); The Honorable (formal)
- Member of: Board of Estimates, among others
- Seat: Baltimore City Hall; Baltimore, Maryland
- Appointer: General election
- Term length: Four years, Two term limits
- Constituting instrument: Baltimore City Charter
- Formation: February 26, 1857
- Website: Official website

The comptroller of Baltimore is a constitutional officer of the U.S. state of Baltimore. The Baltimore City Comptroller's Office is an independently elected office dedicated to fiscal oversight, transparency, and accountability. There have been nineteen individuals who have held office of the comptroller since 1857, when the office was created. The incumbent is Bill Henry who has served since 2020.

Through its various departments and its role on the Board of Estimates, the Office helps ensure the responsible management of City resources.

== Mission ==
The mission of the Comptroller's Office is to encourage sound fiscal policy for the City, support the cost-efficient and effective delivery of City services, and promote the prudent management of City resources. This mission is accomplished through the performance of the Departments of Audits, Accounts Payable, Real Estate, Telecommunications, the Municipal Post Office and the Comptroller's Executive Office, which manages the day-to-day operations of the Board of Estimates including agenda drafting, review, analysis, and document retention.

== Vision ==
As a separate, independently elected part of the Executive Branch, the Baltimore City Office of the Comptroller provides support and direction to the city's fiscal and internal operations. The office promotes transparency and accountability in City government, while encouraging all City agencies to be as effective and efficient in their operations as possible.

== Powers and Duties ==
The Comptroller's office was established under Article V by the City of Baltimore Charter, the office shall appoint, to aid in the discharge of the Comptroller's duties, a Deputy Comptroller and such other employees as provided in the Ordinance of Estimates. In case of temporary absence or disqualification of the Comptroller, the Deputy Comptroller shall, during such absence or disqualification from any cause, perform the duties of the Comptroller, including the Comptroller's duties as a member of the Board of Estimates, Board of Finance, Employee Retirement System Board, Board of Trustees for the Retirement Savings Plan, Fire & Police Employees' Retirement Systems Board, Board of the Baltimore Museum of Art, and Baltimore Hotel Corporation Board.

The general duties of the Comptroller shall:

Serve as a member of the Board of Estimates; Serve as a member of the Board of Finance; Have such general supervision of the Department of Audits and the activities of the City Auditor as provided for in the Charter; Be responsible for the proper conduct, management and operation of the Department of Real Estate; and Subject to the approval of the Board of Estimates, and within the limits of the appropriation therefor in the Ordinance of Estimates, obtain such insurance as may be necessary for the proper protection of the City or as may be required by applicable law, and shall, whenever it would be to the City's advantage, seek competitive bids for the insurance; Be responsible for the proper conduct, management and operation of the Department of Accounts Payable; and perform such other duties, not inconsistent with the office, as prescribed by law.

== Departments ==
The Comptroller's Office houses six departments, five out of six departments The Comptroller is responsible for supervising.

=== Executive Office ===
The Executive Office manages the day-to-day operations for the Board of Estimates. Responsibilities include agenda drafting, review, analysis, and document retention.

=== Department of Accounts Payable ===
The Accounts Payable Department is responsible for managing the City's payments and disbursements, excluding payroll and debt-related expenses. The department works closely with agency fiscal offices to ensure vendors are paid accurately and on time while maintaining an efficient payment process.

=== Department of Audits ===
The Department of Audits serves as the City's independent auditor, whose primary responsibility is promoting accountability and transparency through financial and performance audits. The department is also responsible for investigating fraud and misuse of city resources, reviewing contracts for compliance, and providing audit and advisory services to support effective government operations.

=== Municipal Postal Operations ===
Municipal Postal Operations (MPO) is Baltimore City's central postal and logistics hub. This department is responsible for managing the secure and efficient movement of incoming, outgoing, and interagency mail and packages.

=== Department of Real Estate ===
The Department of Real Estate manages Baltimore City's real estate assets and oversees the City's leasing needs. The department is responsible for handling property acquisitions, sales, leases, and licenses while maintaining transparency, efficiency, and quality service in all real estate transactions.

=== Department of Telecommunications ===
The Department of Telecommunications provides communication services to Baltimore City agencies by managing VoIP systems, mobile devices, call center technology, and telecommunications billing. The department is also responsible for installing and maintaining telecommunication equipment, supporting major city call centers, and operating City Hall's call center to help residents connect with City agencies and elected officials.

== Election and Term of Office ==
The comptroller is elected by the citizens of Baltimore to a four-year term on Election Day in November, and takes office on:

The Comptroller shall assume office on the Tuesday following the first Monday in December after the election and shall serve a four-year term, continuing until a successor is duly elected and qualified. No Comptroller may serve more than two consecutive full terms or more than eight years within any twelve-year period. This limitation does not prohibit a Comptroller who has completed two consecutive terms from seeking another elected office within Baltimore City. A Comptroller elected to fill a vacancy or succeed a removed officeholder pursuant to § 2 of this Article may serve only the remainder of the predecessor's unexpired term and one consecutive full term thereafter.

The City Council, by a three-fourths vote of its members, may remove the Comptroller from office for:

Incompetency, misconduct in office, wilful neglect of duty, or felony or misdemeanor in office, on charges preferred by the Mayor, by the City Council's Committee on Legislative Investigations, a verified petition signed by at least 20% of the qualified voters in Baltimore City, or by the Inspector General, and after notice of those charges and an opportunity to be heard by the City Council are given to the Comptroller.

In the event of a vacancy in the office of comptroller, which may be caused by death, resignation, or removal from office, a successor will be chosen to fill out the unexpired term and shall be elected by the Baltimore City Council by a majority vote of its members.

== List of Comptrollers of Baltimore ==
No.	Image	Name	Tenure	Party
1		Samuel Maccubbin	February 26, 1857 – July 9, 1876	Democratic
2		Samuel S. Mills Jr.	July 10, 1876 – July 17, 1876 (Acting)	Democratic
3		Joshua Vansant	July 17, 1876 – April 8, 1884	Democratic
4		James R. Horner	April 15, 1884 – January 27, 1896	Democratic
5		Charles D. Fenhagen	January 27, 1896 – May 16,1899	Republican
6		James H. Smith	May 16, 1899 – May 19, 1903	Democratic
7		George R. Heffner	May 19, 1903 – June 1, 1907	Democratic
8		Harry F. Hooper	June 1, 1907 – May 16, 1911	Democratic
9		James F. Thrift	May 16, 1911 – May 20, 1919	Democratic
10		Peter E. Tome	May 20, 1919 – May 22, 1923	Republican
11		Richard W. Graham Sr.	May 22, 1923 – May 18, 1943	Democratic
12		Howard E. Crook	May 18, 1943 – May 20, 1947	Democratic
13		John N. McCardell	May 20, 1947 – May 17, 1955	Democratic
14		Richard W. Graham Jr.	May 17, 1955 – May 21, 1963	Independent (Note: Graham ran as an independent candidate for city's comptroller on the Democratic ticket, citing that he wanted "to add some dignity and respect to our city government.")
15		Hyman A. Pressman	May 21, 1963 – December 3, 1991	Democratic (Note: Hyman A. Pressman originally ran for Baltimore city comptroller as a Democrat but lost in the primary. After Republican candidate W. Rae Dempsey Jr. resigned, the GOP nominated Pressman to replace him on the ticket. Judge John G. Prendergast initially ruled against the nomination because Pressman, a registered Democrat, had unsuccessfully sought the same office in the Democratic primary earlier that year. However, just three days later—and only eight days before the election—the Maryland Court of Appeals reversed that decision and confirmed Pressman’s candidacy. In conclusion of the election, the law was modified to prevent this party-switching situation in the future. Pressman ultimately served as Baltimore’s comptroller as a Democrat until retiring in 1991.)
16		Jacqueline F. McLean	December 3, 1991 – July 12, 1994 (Note: McLean took a leave of absence on December 21 but didn't leave the position until their resignation on July 12, 1994. Williams started on December 21 until December 5, 1994, when the newly elected comptroller was sworn in.)	Democratic
17		Shirley A. Williams	December 21, 1993 – December 5, 1995	Democratic
18		Joan M. Pratt	December 5 1995 – December 8, 2020	Democratic
19		Bill Henry	December 8, 2020 – present	Democratic
