= Open Society Institute-Baltimore =

Open Society Institute-Baltimore was the only US field office of Open Society Foundations. It operated for 25 years, founded in 1998 and permanently closed in 2023. The staff and advisory board were based in Baltimore and all of its activities were focused locally.

OSI-Baltimore had three program areas: Criminal and Juvenile Justice, Drug Addiction Treatment, and Youth and Education Development. It also sponsored the Community Fellows Network, a corps of social innovators working in Baltimore's underserved communities.
