= Nick Mosby =

American politician (born 1978)

Nick J. Mosby
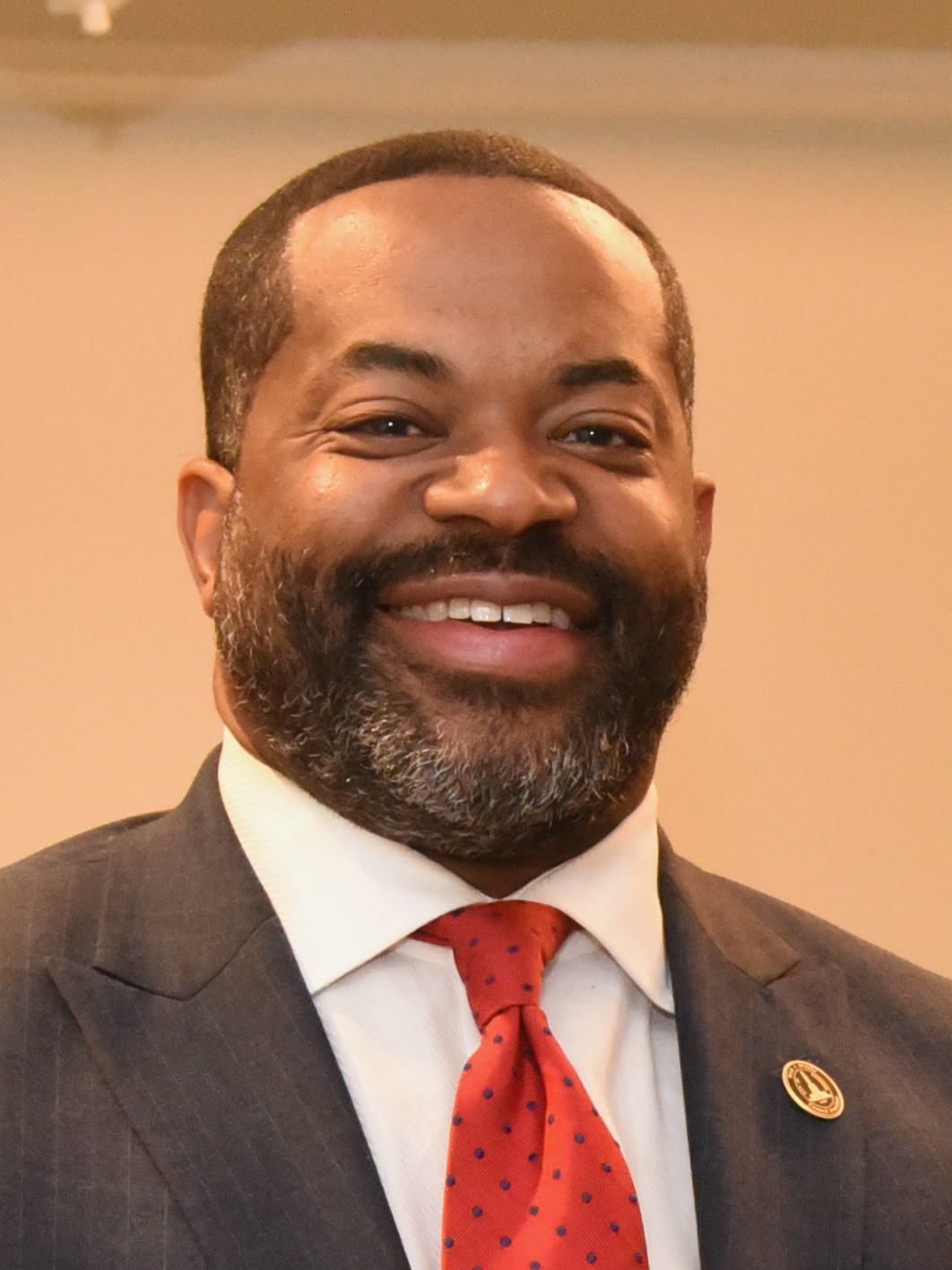
- Mosby in 2023

President of the Baltimore City Council
- In office December 10, 2020 – December 5, 2024
- Preceded by: Brandon Scott
- Succeeded by: Zeke Cohen

Member of the Maryland House of Delegates from the 40th district
- In office January 31, 2017 – December 10, 2020
- Appointed by: Larry Hogan
- Preceded by: Barbara A. Robinson
- Succeeded by: Marlon Amprey

Personal details
- Born: Nicholas James Mosby; 1978 (age 47–48) Baltimore, Maryland
- Party: Democratic
- Spouse: Marilyn Mosby (m. 2005; sep. 2023)
- Education: Baltimore Polytechnic Institute
- Alma mater: Tuskegee University
- Occupation: Electrical engineer Politician

Nicholas James Mosby (born 1978) is an American politician who was the president of the Baltimore City Council from 2020 to 2024. First elected to serve on the city council from 2011 to 2016, Mosby was subsequently appointed in 2017 to the Maryland House of Delegates, representing Baltimore City's 40th District. He was elected as Baltimore City Council president in November 2020, assuming the role in December of that year. Mosby ran for a second term in 2024, but was defeated in the Democratic primary by city councilmember Zeke Cohen.

== Early life ==
Mosby was born in the Northwood neighborhood of Baltimore. He attended Baltimore Polytechnic Institute where he participated in debate team and served as the student council president. According to classmates, Mosby aspired to be mayor while still in high school.

Mosby then attended Tuskegee University, where he received his Bachelor of Science in electrical engineering in 2001. Mosby was inducted as a member of Omega Psi Phi fraternity within the Pi Omega chapter in Baltimore. Mosby then worked as a network engineer and project manager with Verizon. Prior to his political career, Mosby served as a Senior Project Manager with Baltimore Gas and Electric.

== Political career ==
=== Baltimore City Council ===
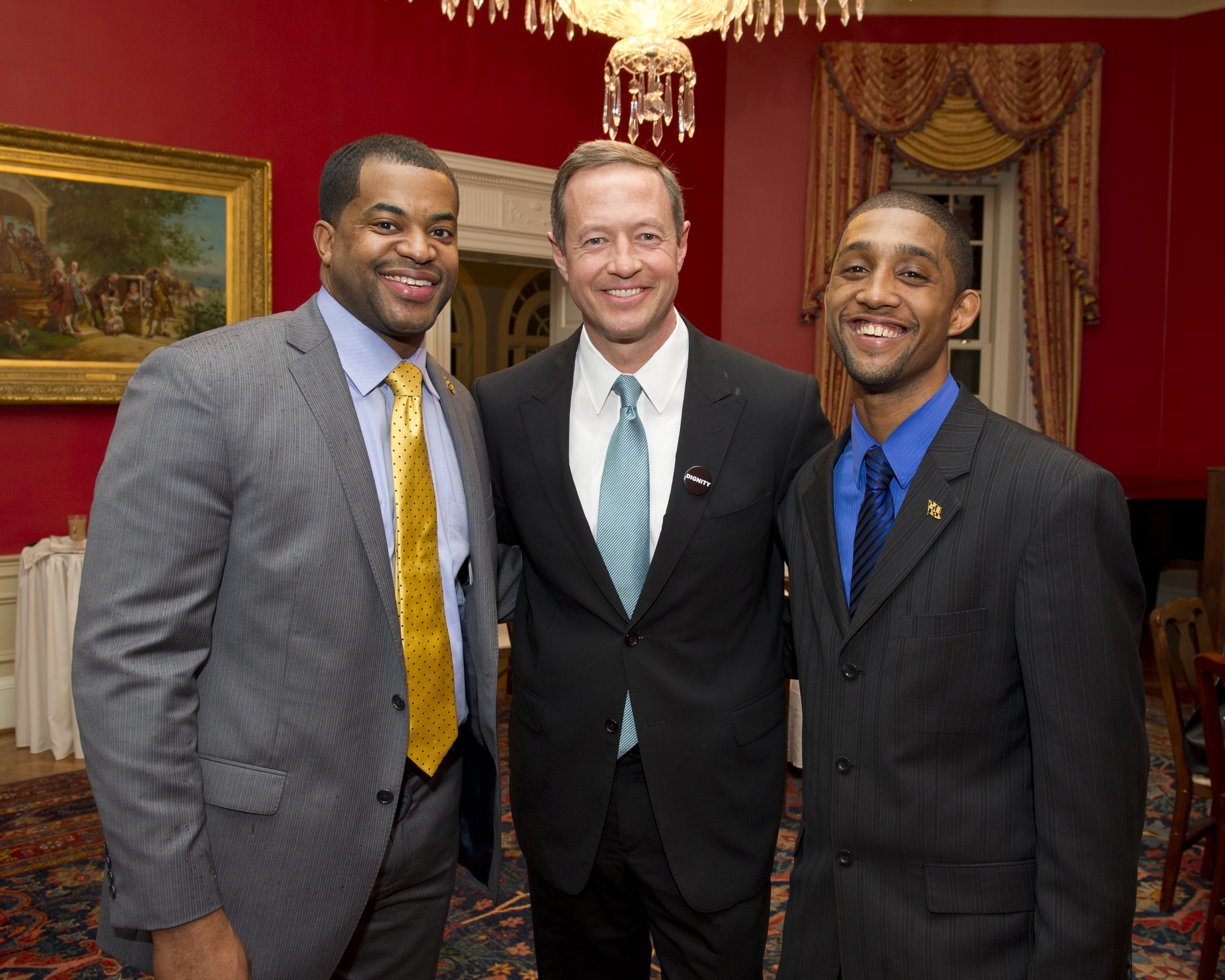
Mosby in 2012 with Governor Martin O'Malley and City Councilor Brandon Scott

Mosby's first attempt for office was as one of seven competitors in the 2007 Democratic primary for the open seat in Baltimore's District 11 City Council seat, vacated by Keiffer Mitchell Jr. In this race, competitor William H. Cole IV received the endorsement of The Baltimore Sun, Maryland Governor Martin O'Malley and Congressman Elijah Cummings, and Mosby went on to place 4th in the election with 10.45% of the vote.

In 2011, Mosby ran again for city council, this time for the city's 7th district seat (his home neighborhood of Reservoir Hill having since been transferred to that district). The district's incumbent, Belinda Conaway, was facing scrutiny for allegations including that her primary residence was outside the city, in violation of city law. Mosby cited this negative media coverage, and Conaway's $21 million libel suit against a blogger as an impetus for him to run against her.

In the intervening years, Mosby had served as a member of the Baltimore City Democratic Central Committee from 2008-2010. Indeed, despite being the challenger, the Baltimore Messenger described the "politically-connected" Mosby as the establishment-backed candidate in the race, citing endorsements of him by Governor (and former Baltimore mayor) O'Malley, prominent union groups, the editors of The Baltimore Sun, and the sitting Mayor Stephanie Rawlings-Blake.

Mosby ultimately defeated Conaway and the other challengers in the Democratic primary with a 51% share of the vote. His defeat of the incumbent Conaway was characterized as an "upset" in city media.

Despite losing the primary nomination, Conaway launched a write-in campaign for the general election later that year. In a formal complaint to Maryland United States Attorney Rod Rosenstein, Conaway alleged illegal conduct on the part of Mosby's campaign in the primary relating to the use of the IRS logo on a mailer and allegations that she had lied on her tax returns, but Mosby's campaign denied any wrongdoing. In November, Conaway further alleged "major fraud" in absentee ballots sent for the wrong council district, writing a formal appeal to Attorney General of the United States Eric Holder, although local officials stated they had received no complaints about the process.

In spite of the write-in challenge, Mosby still won "decisively" in the general election, winning 76.13% of the vote.

==== Tenure ====
In his first year as councilmember, Mosby initially emerged as one of several council allies of Mayor Rawlings-Blake, helping that summer to approve her budget cut proposal, against the amendments of Council President Jack Young. Mosby voted against a proposal to amend the city charter to require biannual audits of city agencies, a stance which also aligned with the Rawlings-Blake administration. Instead, later that year Mosby put forward a separate bill, proposing a city wide commission "to provide input on city audits and how they are conducted," whose members would all be appointed by the mayor. The city's auditor opposed the move, saying the mayoral appointments would "jeopardize [their] independence."

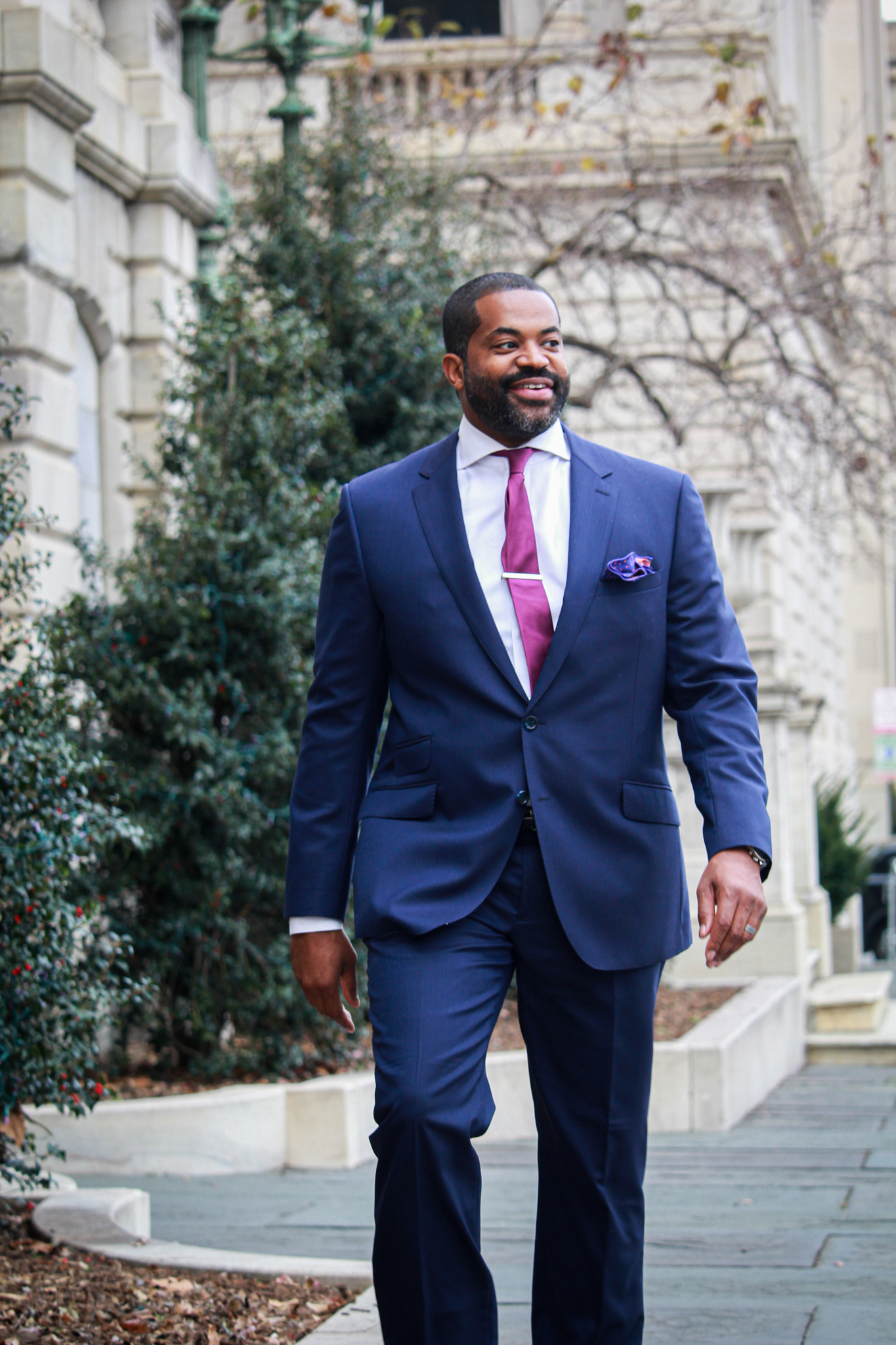
Mosby in 2020

In the summer of 2012, Mosby questioned Mayor Rawlings-Blake's appointment of Anthony Batts, a city outsider, to head the Baltimore Police Department, although he ultimately deferred to her judgment in approving his appointment.

In July 2013, when 20 city recreation centers were shut down as part of Mayor Rawlings-Blake's budget, Mosby spoke in favor of their continued operation under privatized administration, including one in Easterwood re-opened by his fraternity, Omega Psi Phi.

In 2014, Mosby started the "Get Fit with Councilman Mosby" Challenge, partnering with close to 30 personal trainers, fitness organizations and chefs, the American Heart Association and Y of Central MD to provide free access to fitness and cooking classes. Mosby called for hearings on the effects of sweetened beverages on children, and proposed legislation that to require warning labels on all advertisements for sugary drinks.

With the aim to support the phase-out of lightweight plastic bags, Mosby supported unsuccessful 2014 legislation that sought to reduce littering by imposing a fee on disposable plastic bags used in stores.

In September 2014, following the contentious appointment of a replacement for another seat on the council (that of Eric Costello to the 11th district), Mosby supported a special election to replace any further empty seats.

Mosby opposed proposed 2015 state budget cuts to the Baltimore City Public Schools, arguing the cuts would be "devastating."

In 2016, Mosby was the sole "No" vote to limit the influence of the mayor on the city's powerful Board of Estimates.

In August 2016, Mosby voted to raise the city's minimum wage to $15, though the bill failed to pass the full city council.

==== Development and housing ====
In 2013, Mosby, along with fellow councilmember Carl Stokes, initially opposed the $107 million tax increment financing deal proposed by the Rawlings-Blake administration meant as incentive for the construction of Exelon's regional headquarters in the Harbor Point section of the city. However, in September, Mosby ultimately voted for the measure.

In February 2014, Mosby supported Mayor Rawlings-Blakes' proposal for expansion of tax breaks for developers of apartment projects within the city.

While praising support for new housing construction across his district and the city, Mosby recognized that investment in jobs and schools would be necessary in addition to development. He criticized Baltimore's affordable housing law as too weak, and sought to place more responsibility on developers to set aside units for low-income renters.

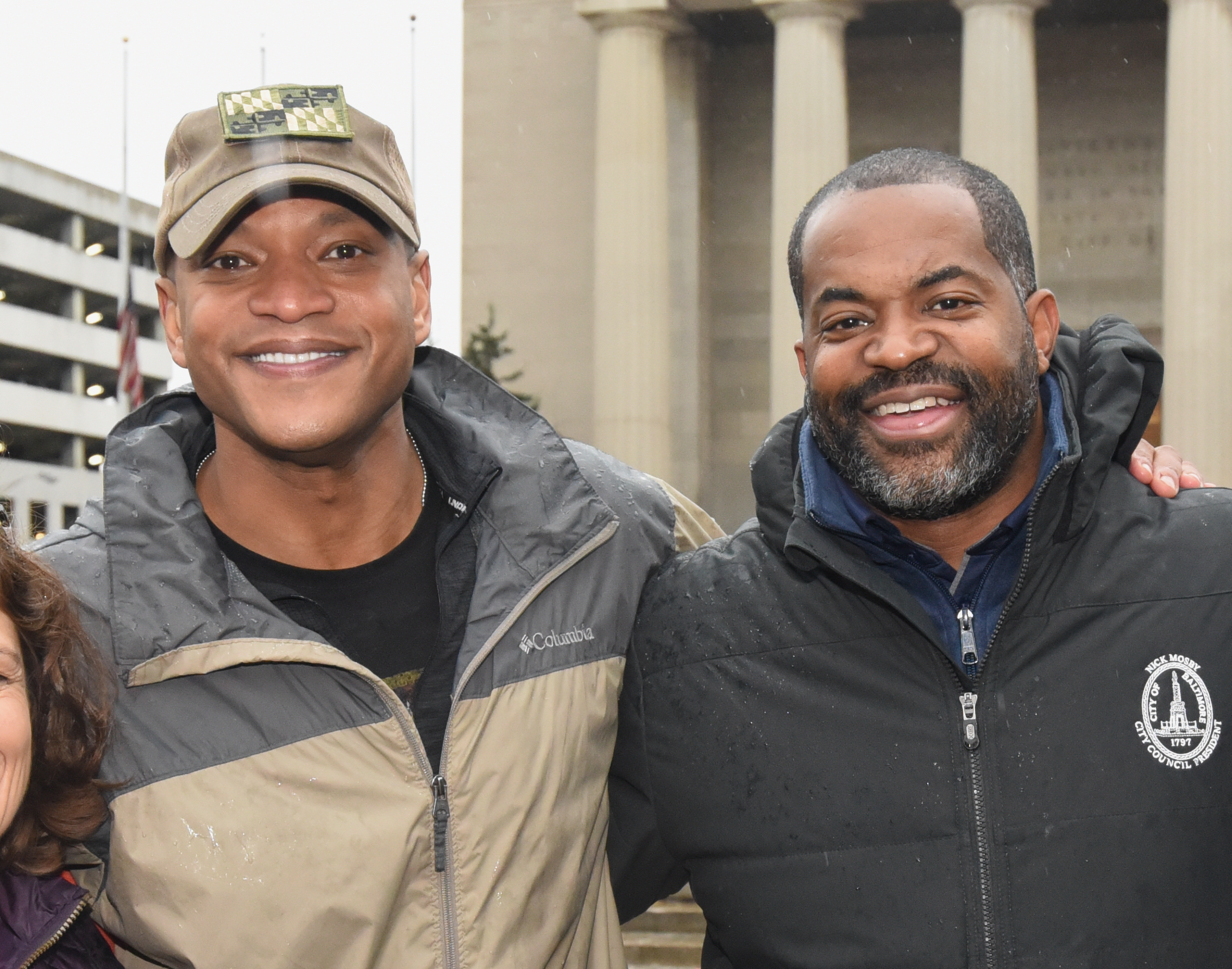
Mosby (right) in 2023 with Governor Wes Moore

As Baltimore overhauled its zoning regulations for the first time in decades, Mosby proposed "more stringent" requirements on liquor stores within residential neighborhoods, including a Public Nuisance Prevention Board that would have allowed community members to provide input on when to limit certain kinds of alcohol sales. Mosby criticized his fellow council members, who stripped his proposed amendment by an 11 to 3 vote, as "cocky" and "arrogant."

==== Ban the Box ====
In 2013, Mosby sponsored Ban the Box legislation, which passed the city council the next year over the opposition of business groups like the Maryland Chamber of Commerce and the Greater Baltimore Committee. The bill, which Mosby characterized the act as the "most progressive" iteration in the country, expanded the city's existing prohibition on asking about criminal history on public job applications to private employers as well.

Baltimore's business community proposed replacing the prohibition with voluntary commitments like "a pledge to hire a certain number of ex-offenders each year" During the spring of 2014, Mosby attempted to reach an agreement with the GBC and business interests, but reported that they were unable to come to a consensus, and so the legislation continued. In an attempt to assuage business critics, Mosby drafted an amendment to exclude job postings where a criminal record would be automatically disqualifying. In multiple editorials, the editors of The Baltimore Sun urged Mosby to accept the GBC's further proposed changes to the law, claiming it would improve Baltimore's perception as "business-friendly."

Despite the opposition, the city council passed the bill 10 to 4 at its April 29 meeting. The final passed legislation applied to private employers with 10 or more employees, where a criminal history would not otherwise bar the candidate (such as in child care). In passing the legislation, Baltimore joined 10 states and about 60 local governments nationwide with similar legislation. Mayor Rawlings-Blake signed the bill into law at the end of May.

==== Crime and violence ====
In 2012, Mosby proposed a city law, subsequently passed, banning the sale of items to minors by stores where more than 20% of sales were for alcohol. Mosby proposed further restrictions on liquor stores in 2016, requiring that they not "adversely affect, jeopardize or endanger public health," but was unable to gain majority support on the council, who voted to remove his amendment from the final zoning package. Mosby also lobbied to shut down operators of illegal after-hours clubs in his district, which he cited as a source of violence.

In the hopes of diverting young men from work in the drug trade, Mosby encouraged urban farm projects within his district as an alternative way of making a living. He wrote in support of neighborhood farm activists in their fight to keep plots from being sold by the city for redevelopment. Mosby also worked with local activists in opposition to anti-LGBT violence.

In August 2013, Mosby worked with fellow councilmember Mary Pat Clarke to close a methadone clinic in the Hampden neighborhood, following complaints from local merchants about associated crime. The two councilmembers supported increasing police foot patrols in the neighborhood.

Following the 2013 killing of Trayvon Martin, Mosby proposed a non-binding resolution calling on the city of Baltimore to boycott Florida-based businesses in protest.

In 2013, Mosby's wife, Marilyn, launched her campaign for Baltimore's State Attorney. The two made the city's increasing homicide rate a central part of their program. Beginning in April, the couple organized weekly "Enough is Enough" marches, working with police and community groups to reduce crime and violence in West Baltimore. Mosby noted the impact of increased police on suppressing crime in his district in June of that year. The Baltimore Sun reported Mosby as supporting a "criminal justice system that is tough on violent offenders and keeps them off the street." Following the death of Tyrone West in July of that year, Mosby criticized the State's Attorney's level of transparency and communication regarding the investigation.

In January 2014, Mosby worked with fellow councilman Brandon Scott and community activists to call for greater citizen intervention against rising homicides in the city, in particular a proposal for a "mobilized street force" of city residents to patrol the Sandtown-Winchester and Belair-Edison neighborhoods. Mosby and Scott also collaborated in proposing a comprehensive security review of city buildings following a January 2015 security breach at a police station.

In February 2015, Mosby was a supporter of requiring body cameras for police officers "as quickly as possible".

==== Freddie Gray and the 2015 uprising ====
During the 2015 Baltimore protests following the death of Freddie Gray, Mosby's council district included Gray's residence in the Gilmor Homes project. Mosby received national coverage for his visible presence during the unrest, and for his calling attention to the roots of the violence. Mosby argued that fundamentally "folks in West Baltimore [...] don't feel they are part of the process." He drew both praise and criticism for his willingness, along with others on the city council, to work with community members including members of gangs in order to bring an end to the unrest.

Mosby agreed that the unrest was "unproductive" but also the result of decades old of lack of investment and socio-economic decline. Mosby also criticized the Baltimore Police Department's early handling of the unrest as "incendiary," "not factual" and "problematic at best."

Following the violence, Mosby advocated for the city to expand its "Safe Streets" anti-violence program to the Sandtown-Winchester neighborhood. He also praised Mayor Rawlings-Blake's decision to fire police commissioner Anthony Batts, saying he hoped it would allow for a "reset" of community-police relations.

=== Mayoral bid ===
Several months after the Freddie Gray unrest, Mosby was reported among those considering a run for mayor of Baltimore. City residents began receiving phone calls polling their potential support for a run in August. Mosby published an op-ed in the Sun calling for "political will" to use data analysis, like the CitiStat program, to modernize the administration of the city. Finally, on October 26, Mosby formally announced his candidacy.

When he announced his bid for the mayoral election, Mosby decided to forego a bid for re-election to his seat on the city council.

Mosby proposed reforming Baltimore City's Civilian Review Board to include elected seats. Similarly, he (along with several other candidates) proposed the city transition to a partially-elected school board. Recognizing the limits on the city's ability to reform city schools legislatively (as the system is controlled in part by the state of Maryland directly), Mosby promised to provide extra-legislative support for the system, such as increasing use of City Year members to find recent college graduates to teach in city schools.

As a candidate, Mosby called for the creation of a city task force "to help provide free expungements of criminal records, pay fees for Baltimore residents to seek GEDs, cover the cost of vocational training at Baltimore City Community College in certain high-demand job sectors, subsidize apprenticeship programs and refund the income taxes for unemployed ex-offenders to the business that hire them." During his candidacy, Mosby opposed granting tax breaks to the operators of the Royal Farms Arena, citing the potential loss of millions in tax revenue without prior study. He also called for the city to sue lead paint manufacturers, and to use the proceeds to remove lead from houses in the city. He also claimed he would eliminate the city's gag order on police brutality lawsuit settlements. Mosby proposed cutting the city's property taxes and introducing a separate fee for trash pickup.

Along with most of the candidates, Mosby supported the city's tax increment-financed support of the Port Covington redevelopment proposed by Under Armour CEO Kevin Plank.

In the televised Democratic Primary debates, opponents implied Mosby would have a potential conflict of interest if elected mayor, as his wife remained the city's state's attorney. Respondents to a non-scientific poll in The Baltimore Sun said 57% to 41% that they did think it would pose a conflict of interest. In its editorial, the Sun rejected the idea, arguing Mosby "deserve[d] the chance to make his case." In November 2015, 58% of poll respondents said his marriage would not impact their vote one way or the other (38% said it made them less likely to support him).

In a November poll, Mosby registered 10% support among likely primary voters. In January, he was reported to have 7% support among primary voters. By mid-March, Mosby was reported to have 6% support. Polling in April showed his support at 4%.

Mosby dropped out of the race the week before the primary, though his name remained on the ballot. In dropping out, Mosby endorsed one of the two frontrunners, Catherine E. Pugh, which fueled speculation that he may have been seeking a position with a future Pugh administration, speculation which Mosby denied. Upon Pugh's victory in the primary later in April, speculation then focused on whether Mosby would seek to replace Pugh in the Maryland Senate's 40th district. Mosby ultimately applied for the seat, but the district's central committee selected Delegate Barbara A. Robinson instead.

=== Maryland House of Delegates ===
In January 2017, Mosby applied to the Democratic Central Committee of Maryland's 40th district to replace the outgoing Robinson in her seat in Maryland House of Delegates. Mosby was selected after the committee's original choice, Pugh aide Gary Brown Jr., was indicted for campaign finance violations. On taking office, Mosby cited lead abatement, property values and school performance as legislative focuses for him.

Three months after his appointment, Mosby made an unsuccessful attempt to become the head of Baltimore's delegation to the House of Delegates.

==== Tenure ====
In March 2017, Mosby sponsored legislation to assist people affected by gambling addiction.

In January 2018, Mosby supported plans to demolish and redevelop the Gilmor Homes project in his former city council district.

In March 2018, Mosby put forward legislation to use state funds to research the effect of Maryland's gun laws.

Mosby was a 2019 co-sponsor of legislation to allow lawsuits to be filed in Baltimore courts against manufacturers of lead paint The legislation failed to pass during the 2019 session.

In January 2019, Mosby joined State Senator Mary Washington to introduce bills prohibiting Baltimore city from placing liens on homes and churches due to unpaid water bills.

While serving on the House's marijuana legalization task force in 2019, Mosby suggested eliminating caps on the number of licensed producers in the state in order to avoid excluding racial minority owners from participating in the growing market.

Mosby was lead sponsor of a statewide "Ban the Box" bill, which was passed but vetoed by Maryland Governor Larry Hogan

In March 2020, Mosby was the lead sponsor of several among a package of ethics, anti-corruption and campaign finance bills that passed the House of Delegates.

Mosby supported reforms to Maryland's child support system in March 2020, which required courts to consider parent's extenuating circumstances and actual income before assigning the amount of support to be paid, calling them "definitely incremental steps in the right direction," and called for a commission to look into the situation further.

A graduate and supporter of historically black colleges and universities, Mosby sponsored an unsuccessful 2018 House bill to increase Maryland HBCUs funding to compensate for historical losses due to unfair treatment by the state. In May 2019, another Mosby-sponsored bill was successfully signed into law, this one providing up to $240,000 in annual tax credits to historically-black Maryland colleges and universities.

Mosby was a critic of proposals in 2019 to move the Preakness Stakes from Northwest Baltimore's Pimlico Race Course to Laurel Park in neighboring Anne Arundel County.

==== Criminal justice ====
As a delegate, Mosby was involved in several bills involving criminal justice and policing. Mosby criticized Governor Larry Hogan's removal of judicial discretion in applying mandatory minimum sentencing laws, arguing they have "never been an effective way of reducing violence." In 2020, he sponsored a bill allowing parole without governor approval for inmates who had served more than 30 years.

In 2019, Mosby voted against allowing school police to be armed. He was also skeptical of the Johns Hopkins University proposal for a private police force and voted against the legislation authorizing it. Mosby supported moving Baltimore's police academy at Coppin State University.

=== Baltimore City Council President ===
Late in the summer of 2019, Mosby was reported to be considering a second run for mayor of Baltimore. By October 2019, it was instead reported that Mosby was considering a run for the Presidency of the Baltimore City Council. Mosby announced his candidacy in December.

Mosby entered into what The Baltimore Sun called "the first competitive race for the position in nearly a decade." Mosby was considered an early frontrunner in the race, with a February poll showing him receiving 26% of support, with his closest competitor, former council member Carl Stokes, receiving 10% support.

He received the endorsement of Mayor Jack Young in March. In May, Mosby received the endorsement of The Baltimore Sun in the Democratic primary election. In the primary, held June 2, Mosby was the victor, winning with 40.2% of the vote.

Prior to the general election, Mosby received the endorsement of the Baltimore Afro-American on November 2. He easily won election in November, defeating his Republican opponent with 79.5% of the vote.

In March 2021, The Baltimore Sun reported that federal prosecutors had opened a criminal investigation into Mosby and his wife, State’s Attorney Marilyn Mosby, subpoenaing her campaign and the couple’s business records.

Mosby ran for a second term in 2024, but was defeated in the Democratic primary by city councilmember Zeke Cohen.

=== Post-City Council President career ===
In February 2025, Mosby was appointed by Governor Wes Moore to the Maryland State Lottery and Gaming Commission.

== Personal life ==
=== Marriage and family ===
In 2005, Mosby married Marilyn Mosby (née James), who subsequently became the state's attorney of Baltimore City. The two are often referred to as a "power couple" in Maryland politics. Shortly after his wife's election, Mosby stated he would recuse himself from any prosecutor-related matters in the city council, following speculation that the two might influence each other's actions in office.

On July 21, 2023, the Mosbys filed for divorce.

=== Financial issues ===
In October 2020, a $45,000 tax lien was filed against the property of Nick Mosby and his wife, Baltimore State's Attorney Marilyn Mosby, for three years of unpaid federal taxes (2014, 2015, and 2016). Nick Mosby stated that he has been "in ongoing conversations with the IRS" about resolving this issue. That same month, it was reported that Mosby's consulting company, Monumental Squared LLC, was listed as sharing its address with a developer who was also a major campaign donor to Mosby. Later in October, Mosby received scrutiny over his joint ownership of a rental property that was reported to be unregistered with the city, and not listed as lead-certified. Mosby's co-signator on the mortgage argued that Mosby had no direct involvement in the renting of the home, nor in evictions from it.

Mosby stated the debt was a result of an early withdrawal from his retirement savings that he used to cover "family tragedies." Mosby subsequently reported the tax lien was paid off in full.

During Marilyn Mosby's federal trial for mortgage fraud, Mosby testified that he lied to the public about the status of his taxes. Mosby later stated he regretted lying to voters.

=== Religion ===
Mosby is a lifelong Catholic.

== Electoral history ==
2007 Baltimore City Council, District 11, Democratic Party primary election
| Party | Candidate | Votes | % |
|---|---|---|---|
| Democratic | William H. Cole IV | 2,042 | 34.58% |
| Democratic | Fred D. Mason, III | 1,300 | 22.01% |
| Democratic | Karen Veronica Brown | 734 | 12.43% |
| Democratic | Nick Mosby | 617 | 10.45% |
| Democratic | Adam S. Meister | 488 | 8.26% |
| Democratic | Dana Owens | 440 | 7.45% |
| Democratic | Rita Collins | 136 | 2.30% |
| Democratic | Brandon Thornton | 102 | 1.73% |
| Democratic | Warren Zussman | 47 | 0.80% |

2011 Baltimore City Council, District 7, Democratic Party primary election
| Party | Candidate | Votes | % |
|---|---|---|---|
| Democratic | Nick Mosby | 2,871 | 50.77% |
| Democratic | Belinda K. Conaway | 2,218 | 39.22% |
| Democratic | Allen Hicks | 286 | 5.06% |
| Democratic | Henry W. Brim, Jr. | 141 | 2.49% |
| Democratic | Timothy Mercer | 139 | 2.46% |

2011 Baltimore City Council, District 7, general election
| Party | Candidate | Votes | % |
|---|---|---|---|
| Democratic | Nick Mosby | 3,075 | 76.13% |
| Democratic | Belinda K. Conaway | 761 | 18.84% |
| Republican | Michael John Bradley | 188 | 4.65% |
| | Other Write-Ins | 15 | 00.37% |

2016 Baltimore Mayor, Democratic Party primary election
| Party | Candidate | Votes | % |
|---|---|---|---|
| Democratic | Catherine E. Pugh | 48,709 | 36.6% |
| Democratic | Sheila Dixon | 46,301 | 34.8% |
| Democratic | Elizabeth Embry | 15,576 | 11.7% |
| Democratic | David Warnock | 10,850 | 8.1% |
| Democratic | DeRay McKesson | 3,445 | 2.6% |
| Democratic | Nick Mosby | 1,992 | 1.5% |
| Democratic | Calvin Allen Young, III | 646 | 0.5% |
| Democratic | Patrick Gutierrez | 399 | 0.3% |
| Democratic | Cindy Walsh | 211 | 0.2% |
| Democratic | Mack Clifton | 203 | 0.2% |
| Democratic | Gersham Cupid | 136 | 0.1% |
| Democratic | Wilton Wilson | 75 | 0.1% |

2018 Maryland House of Delegates, Democratic Party primary election
| Party | Candidate | Votes | % |
|---|---|---|---|
| Democratic | Nick Mosby | 6,306 | 20.6% |
| Democratic | Melissa Wells | 4,423 | 14.4% |
| Democratic | Frank M. Conaway, Jr. | 4,230 | 13.8% |
| Democratic | Westley West | 3,099 | 10.1% |
| Democratic | Gabriel Auteri | 2,905 | 9.5% |
| Democratic | Terrell Boston-Smith | 2,867 | 9.4% |
| Democratic | Sanjay Thomas | 1,646 | 5.4% |
| Democratic | Sarah Matthews | 1,361 | 4.4% |
| Democratic | Latia Hopkins | 1,231 | 4.0% |
| Democratic | Anees Abdul-Rahim | 1,075 | 3.5% |
| Democratic | Brian Murphy | 898 | 2.9% |
| Democratic | Timothy Mercer | 370 | 1.2% |
| Democratic | Blair DuCray | 240 | 0.8% |

2018 Maryland House of Delegates, general election
| Party | Candidate | Votes | % |
|---|---|---|---|
| Democratic | Nick Mosby | 19,726 | 30.5% |
| Democratic | Melissa Wells | 18,952 | 29.3% |
| Democratic | Frank M. Conaway, Jr. | 16,767 | 25.9% |
| Green | Joshua Harris | 8,833 | 13.6% |
| | Will Hanna (Write In) | 148 | 0.2% |
| | Other Write-Ins | 337 | 0.5% |

2020 Baltimore City Council President, Democratic Party primary election
| Party | Candidate | Votes | % |
|---|---|---|---|
| Democratic | Nick Mosby | 55,424 | 40.2% |
| Democratic | Shannon Sneed | 40,474 | 29.4% |
| Democratic | Carl Stokes | 29,012 | 21.1% |
| Democratic | Leon F. Pinkett, III | 5,503 | 4.0% |
| Democratic | Dan Sparaco | 3,755 | 2.7% |
| Democratic | Marques Dent | 2,199 | 1.6% |
| Democratic | Leo W. Burroughs | 1,408 | 1.0% |

2020 Baltimore City Council President, general election
| Party | Candidate | Votes | % |
|---|---|---|---|
| Democratic | Nick Mosby | 178,689 | 79.5% |
| Republican | Jovani M. Patterson | 42,628 | 19.0% |
| | Other Write-Ins | 3,361 | 1.5% |
