= Zeke Cohen =

American politician (born 1984)

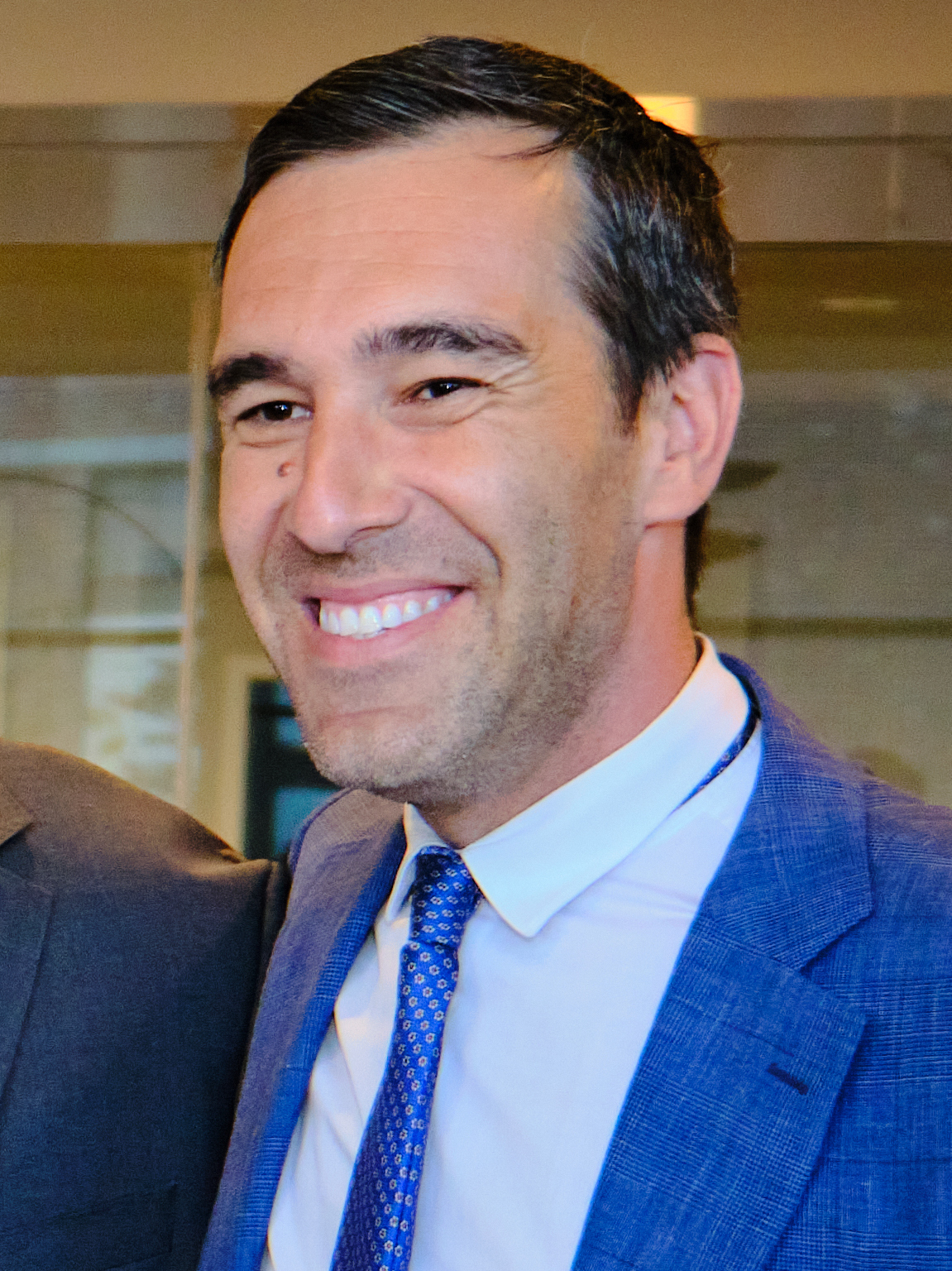
- Cohen in 2023

President of the Baltimore City Council
- Incumbent
- Assumed office December 5, 2024
- Preceded by: Nick Mosby

Member of the Baltimore City Council from District 1
- In office December 8, 2016 – December 5, 2024
- Preceded by: James B. Kraft
- Succeeded by: Mark Parker

Personal details
- Born: Ezekiel Berzoff-Cohen; September 19, 1984 (age 41) Northampton, Massachusetts, U.S.
- Party: Democratic
- Spouse: Reena (m. 2015)
- Education: Goucher College (BA); Johns Hopkins University (MA)

Ezekiel Berzoff-Cohen (born September 19, 1984) is an American politician who has served as the president of the Baltimore City Council since 2024. He previously represented the 1st district of the city council from 2016 to 2024.

== Early life and education ==
Cohen was born in Northampton, Massachusetts, on September 19, 1984, to father Lewis Cohen, a psychiatrist, and mother Joan Berzoff, a professor at Smith College. He moved from Massachusetts to Baltimore to attend Goucher College, where he served as the president of the student government association and graduated with a Bachelor of Arts degree in political science in 2008. Cohen later attended Johns Hopkins University, where he earned a Master of Arts degree in public policy.

Cohen taught middle school social studies with Teach for America at George G. Kelson Elementary School and Curtis Bay Elementary School until 2011, when he founded his own nonprofit, The Intersection, which ran after-school programs for city youth. In August 2022, Cohen was hired as a consultant for Open Society Foundations.

== Baltimore City Council ==
=== Tenure ===
In March 2015, Cohen announced that he would run for the Baltimore City Council in District 1, seeking to succeed retiring city councilor James Kraft. During the Democratic primary, he ran on a platform including providing universal prekindergarten, improving police-community relationships, making Baltimore more pedestrian-friendly, expanding the city's summer jobs program, and reducing fees on small businesses. Cohen won the six-way Democratic primary election with 27.3 percent of the vote on April 26, 2016, and defeated Republican nominee Matthew McDaniel in the general election on November 8. He was sworn into the Baltimore City Council on December 8, 2016, where he was a member of the Education, Workforce, and Youth Committee during his entire tenure, including as its chair from 2016 to 2020, and on the Housing and Urban Affairs Committee and Public Safety Committee from 2016 to 2020. During his tenure, Cohen gained a reputation as a progressive, an ally to Baltimore Mayor Brandon Scott, and as one of the most effective members of the city council.

Cohen ran for re-election in 2020. He defeated challenger Paris Bienert in the Democratic primary and ran unopposed in the general election. During the election, Cohen asked his supporters to donate to Baltimore City Public Schools funds to support families amid the COVID-19 pandemic.

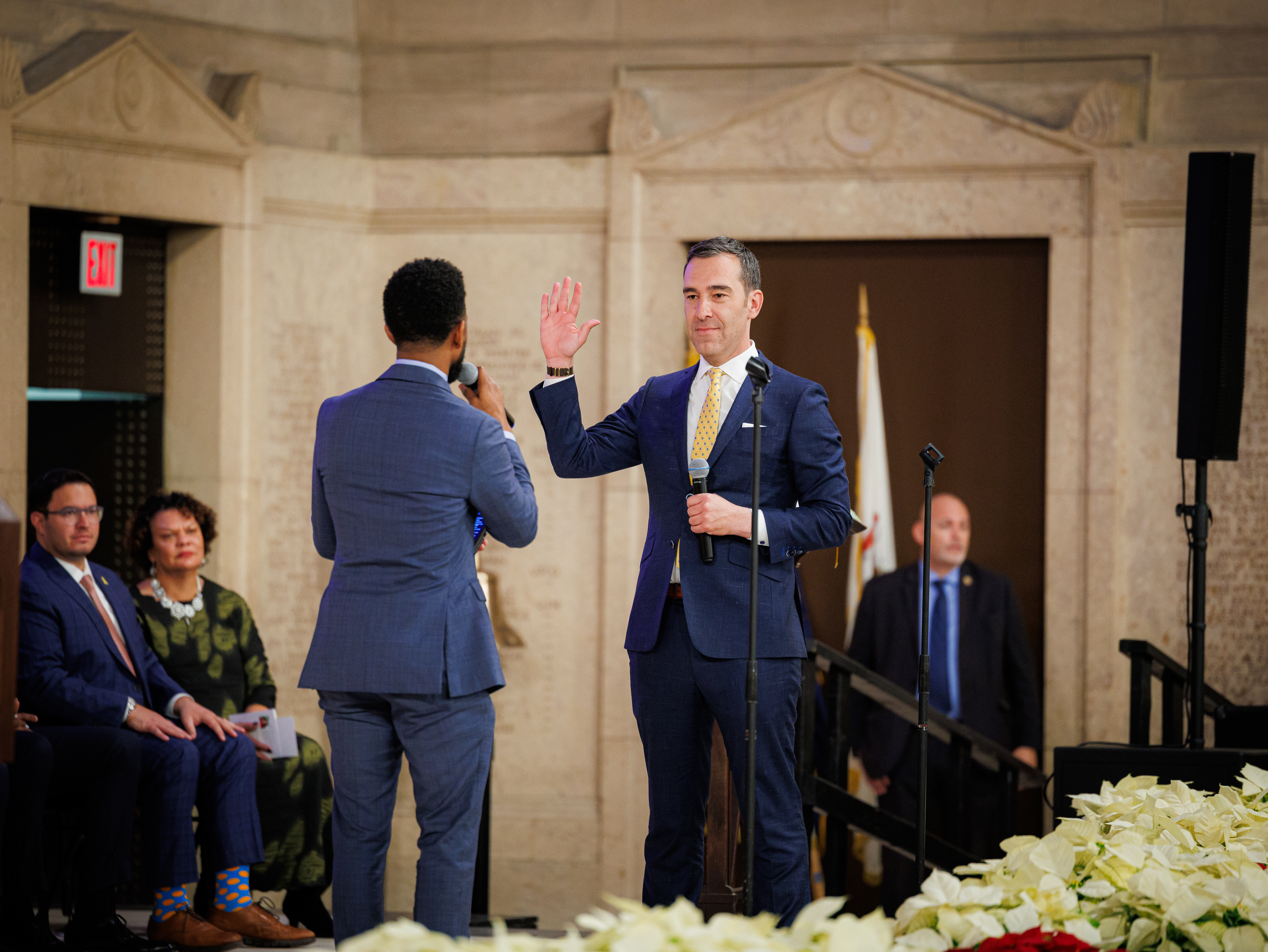
Cohen is sworn in as city council president by Mayor Brandon Scott, 2024

In January 2023, Cohen expressed interest in running for president of the Baltimore City Council, challenging incumbent president Nick Mosby. He officially entered the race on March 19, 2023. During the Democratic primary, Cohen criticized Mosby for his fights with Scott. He also received endorsements from State's Attorney Ivan Bates, Comptroller Bill Henry, and various local labor unions. He also led his competitors, Mosby and former city councilmember Shannon Sneed, in fundraising. Cohen defeated Mosby in the Democratic primary election on May 14, 2024, and defeated Republican challenger Emmanuel Digman in the general election. Cohen was sworn in on December 5, 2024, and is the first Jewish president of the Baltimore City Council since Walter Orlinsky.

=== Crime and policing ===
During his 2016 city council campaign, Cohen criticized Mayor Martin O'Malley's CitiStat and zero-tolerance crime policies as "failures". He supports giving the city of Baltimore control over its police department. He also called for several community-focused police reforms, including a shift away from the police department's war on drugs mentality and toward prioritizing public safety over making arrests.

In July 2019, Cohen introduced a bill requiring agencies that interact with children and families to train employees on how to respond to trauma. The bill, which was later renamed after the late U.S. representative Elijah Cummings, passed, and was signed into law by Mayor Jack Young in February 2020. The law made Baltimore the first American city to have legislated trauma-informed care into law.

Cohen called for cuts to city police funding following the murder of George Floyd in June 2020, and called for criminal justice reforms after Derek Chauvin was sentenced in April 2021. He supported Maryland Police Accountability Act of 2021, which repealed the Law Enforcement Officers' Bill of Rights, limited the use of no-knock warrants, and required police body cameras.

In July 2022, after 48-year-old Timothy Reynolds was fatally shot in a confrontation with squeegee workers, Cohen sent an open letter to the deputy mayor calling on the city to put an end to squeegee work by increasing enforcement, support systems, and job opportunities for youth. He also suggested using universal basic income to give squeegee workers direct payments to encourage them to stop washing car windows at intersections.

During his 2024 city council president campaign, Cohen supported State's Attorney Bates's increased use of the citation docket to address low-level offenses, such as drug possession and loitering.

=== Development initiatives ===
In February 2023, Cohen introduced a bill requiring city officials to increase inspections on buildings with 20 units or more and with a record of poor conditions until conditions improve, and would revoke rental licenses form landlords that do not improve their buildings' conditions.

After the Baltimore Board of Estimates voted to approve Mayor Brandon Scott's Baltimore Gas and Electric (BGE) conduit agreement in February 2023, Cohen called for the reform or abolition of the Board of Estimates. Cohen later rallied against BGE proposals to increase gas rates by an average of $10.36 per month over a span of three years, or about a 63 percent increase, to pay for new gas infrastructure.

=== Education ===
Cohen supported Mayor Catherine Pugh's proposal to provide free community college for high school graduates. In October 2018, he organized the Support Our Schools Tour, which highlighted solutions and issues in the state's public school systems ahead of the Kirwan Commission releasing the Blueprint for Maryland's Future. In April 2023, Cohen called on Baltimore City Public Schools to return to a five-day school week during its summer session, saying that it would support student safety and prevent youth violence. He later launched a "Field Trip Fridays" program with local nonprofits for students enrolled in summer programming with city schools.

During his 2024 city council president campaign, Cohen supported universal preschool and implementing restorative practices and conflict resolution training in schools.

=== Ethics reform ===
In April 2018, Cohen introduced the "Transparency in Lobbying Act", which requires the city ethics board to post lobbying disclosure forums online quarterly. The bill passed and became law in October 2018, and the lobbying reporting website went live in October 2019. After Baltimore voters approved a ballot initiative implementing a two-term limit on elected officials in November 2022, Cohen voted against a bill to shorten the time needed for officials to qualify for pensions to eight years, instead supporting a competitive retirement plan system for elected officials. He supported Mayor Brandon Scott's veto of the pension bill.

=== Environment ===
In January 2023, Cohen wrote to the Baltimore Public Works Department to criticize its decision to invest limited federal stimulus in the city's Clean Corps program, and to call on the department to reinstate its weekly recycling pickup. He later introduced a resolution calling for higher wages for the city's sanitation workers. In March 2023, after it was reported that the Back River Wastewater Treatment Plant would treat 675,000 gallons of wastewater from the East Palestine, Ohio, train derailment site, Cohen introduced a resolution to prevent the wastewater system from treating wastewater from the train crash.

=== Immigration ===
In March 2017, Cohen introduced a resolution calling on U.S. Immigration and Customs Enforcement agents to "not target anyone who merely lacks proper documentation" or students permitted to study under the Deferred Action for Childhood Arrivals program. The resolution was unanimously passed by the Baltimore City Council. In May 2021, he was arrested and charged with civil disobedience for participating in a CASA de Maryland protest in Washington, D.C. to pressure lawmakers to pass legislation creating a path for citizenship for immigrants.

=== Minimum wage ===
In March 2017, Cohen voted to raise Baltimore's minimum wage to $15 an hour by 2022.

=== Redistricting ===
In October 2023, Cohen voted against a city council redistricting map proposed by city council president Nick Mosby, expressing frustration with the rushed process of passing the new maps. In February 2024, he proposed establishing an independent redistricting commission to draw Baltimore's city council districts.

=== Social issues ===
In March 2019, Cohen introduced a resolution calling on Baltimore City Public Schools to adopt a policy protecting transgender students against gender discrimination. The Baltimore City Council unanimously voted to approve the resolution. He also introduced a bill requiring all single-occupancy bathrooms to be gender-neutral, which passed and was signed into law by Mayor Jack Young.

In May 2022, following the leak of a draft opinion in the U.S. Supreme Court case Dobbs v. Jackson Women's Health Organization, which would overturn Roe v. Wade and Planned Parenthood v. Casey, Cohen introduced a resolution calling for the creation of a city fund to support reproductive health care service providers, which was approved by the Baltimore City Council. He also called on Governor Larry Hogan to release funding for the Abortion Care Access Act, which expanded the types of healthcare providers who can perform abortions.

In July 2022, Cohen introduced a bill establishing the Baltimore City Commission on Aging, an independent agency tasked with assessing the needs of the city's senior population and connecting them with services. The Baltimore City Council unanimously voted to approve the legislation in August 2023.

In June 2023, Cohen introduced an amendment to the city budget to move $1 million in funding from the Baltimore Office of Promotion & the Arts to the city's public library system to assist with implementing the Peer Navigators program, which helps connect community members with addiction and behavioral health issues with experts. He withdrew the amendment a few weeks later and was the only member of the city council to vote against the final passage of the budget.

In July 2023, Cohen rallied against the closure of three of the city's public pools through the entirety of the summer, which prompted city officials to temporarily backtrack and later give Cohen special approval to solicit private funds for a pop-up splash pad in Patterson Park.

In December 2023, Cohen voted for a resolution condemning the 2023 Hamas-led attack on Israel and calling for the immediate release of hostages, and against a resolution calling for a long-term ceasefire in the Gaza war.

=== Transportation ===
Cohen supports the Red Line and criticized Governor Larry Hogan's cancellation of the transit line project. During his 2016 city council campaign, he supported the implementation of Baltimore's Bicycle Master Plan and expanding the city's public transportation system, including light rail and Charm City Circulator routes.

== Personal life ==
External videos
- Zeke Cohen Campaign Event - The Proposal via YouTube

Cohen lives in the Brewer's Hill neighborhood of Baltimore. He is married to his wife Reena, who works as a doctor at MedStar Harbor Hospital and whom he proposed to at his 2016 campaign kickoff. He is Jewish.

== Electoral history ==
Baltimore City Council District 1 Democratic primary election, 2016
| Party | Candidate | Votes | % |
|---|---|---|---|
| Democratic | Zeke Cohen | 2,196 | 27.3 |
| Democratic | Scott Goldman | 1,661 | 20.7 |
| Democratic | Mark Edelson | 1,387 | 17.3 |
| Democratic | Mark Parker | 1,362 | 17.0 |
| Democratic | Ed Marcinko | 830 | 10.3 |
| Democratic | Sean P. Flanagan | 597 | 7.4 |

Baltimore City Council District 1 election, 2016
| Party | Candidate | Votes | % |
|---|---|---|---|
| Democratic | Zeke Cohen | 12,548 | 66.8 |
| Republican | Matthew McDaniel | 6,170 | 32.8 |
| Write-in | | 67 | 0.4 |

Baltimore City Council District 1 election, 2020
| Party | Candidate | Votes | % |
|---|---|---|---|
| Democratic | Zeke Cohen (incumbent) | 17,588 | 95.4 |
| Write-in | | 843 | 4.6 |
