= 2026 Maryland Senate election =

- November 3, 2026

All 47 seats of the Maryland Senate 24 seats needed for a majority
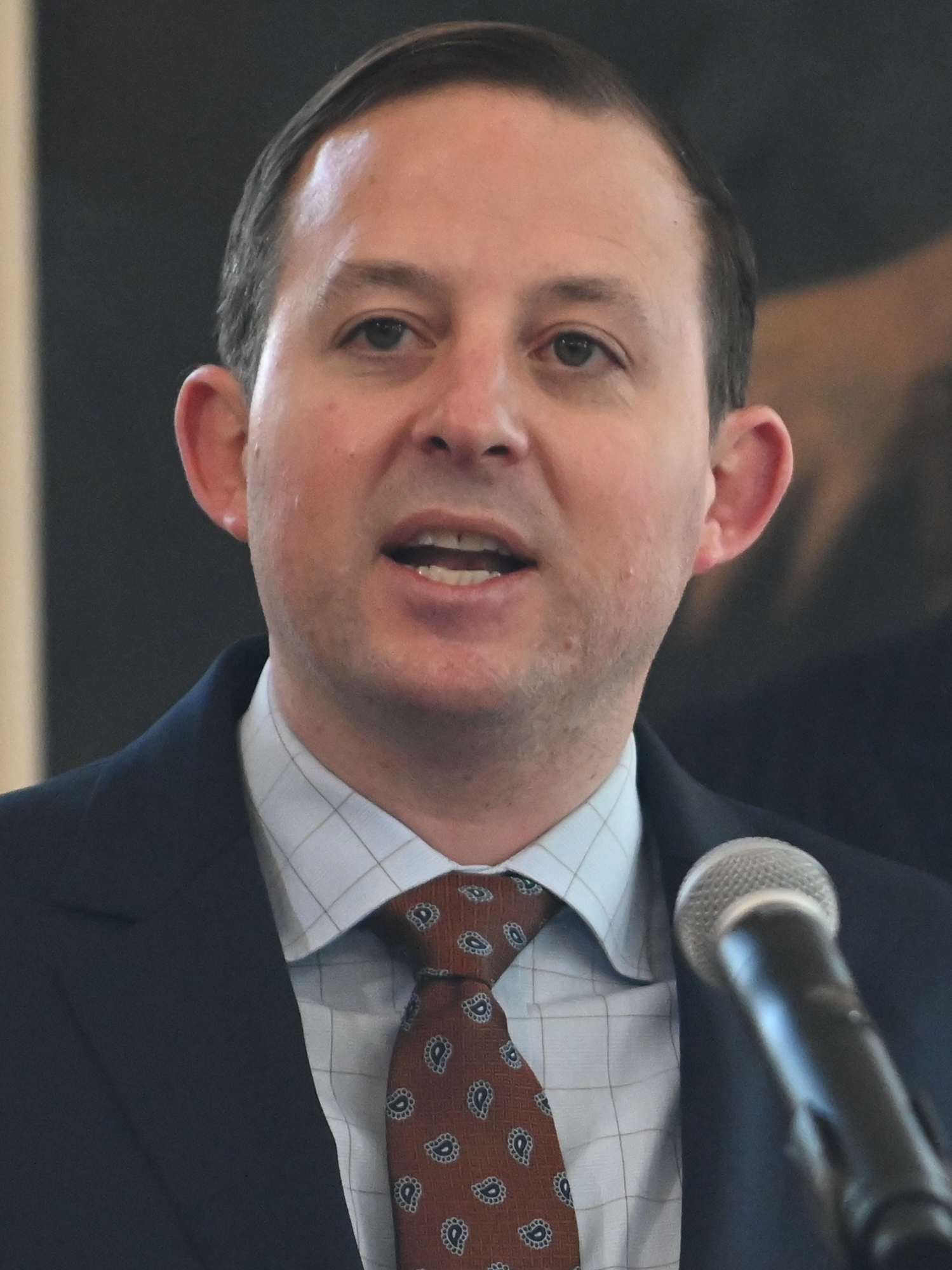

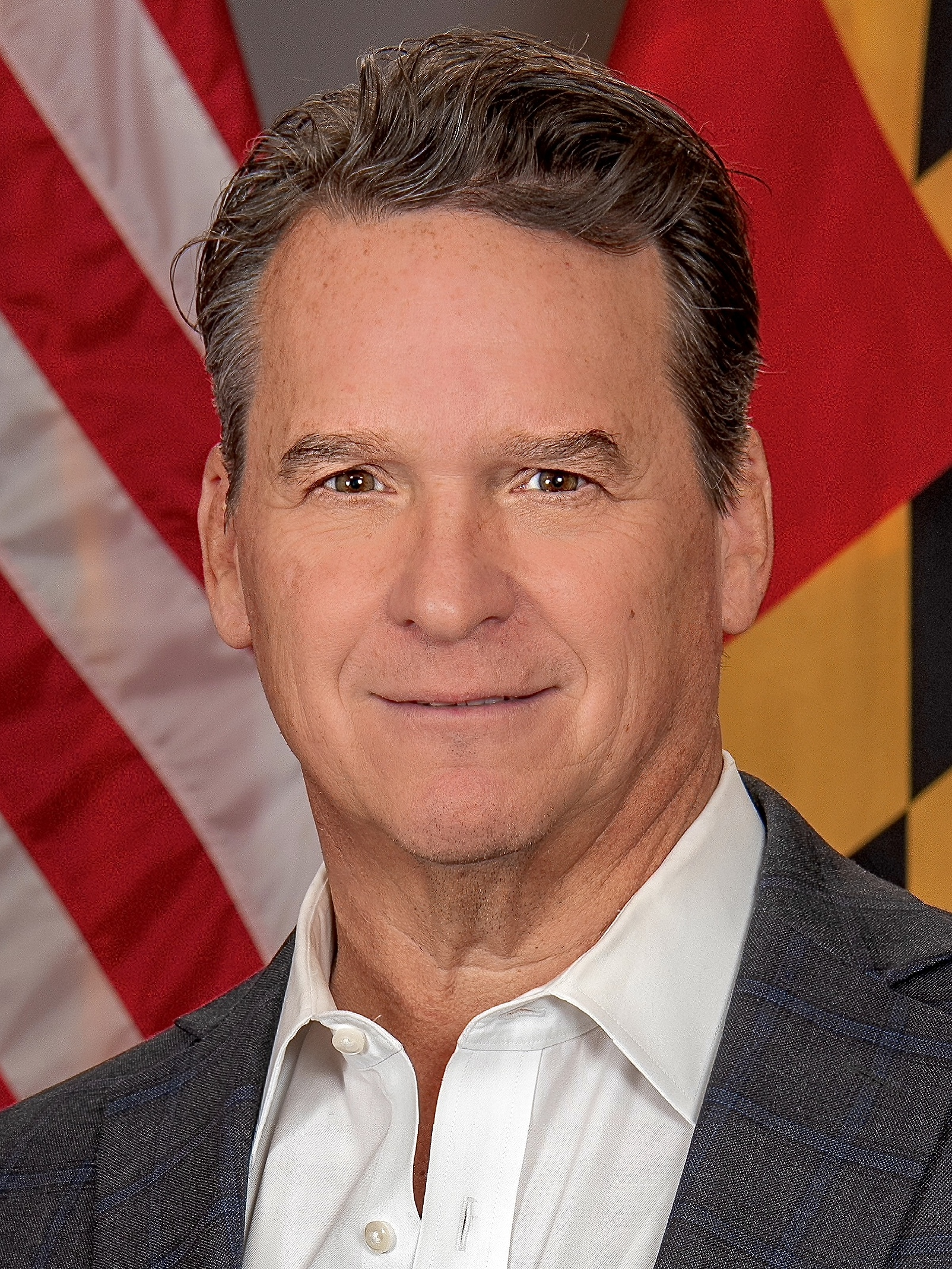
	Majority party	Minority party
Leader	Bill Ferguson	Steve Hershey
Party	Democratic	Republican
Leader since	January 8, 2020	January 11, 2023
Leader's seat	46th–Baltimore	36th–Queenstown
Seats before	34	13
Seats won	35	12
Seat change	▲1	▼1
- Results of the elections: Democratic hold Democratic gain Republican hold
President before election
Bill Ferguson
Democratic
Elected President
Bill Ferguson
Democratic

The 2026 Maryland Senate election was held on November 3, 2026, to elect senators in all 47 districts of the Maryland Senate. Members were elected in single-member constituencies to four-year terms. These elections were held concurrently with various federal and state elections, including for governor of Maryland.

Three Democrats and two Republicans retired or ran for higher office instead of seeking re-election; 31 Democrats and 11 Republicans ran for re-election. In the primary elections, two Democrats lost renomination: Nancy J. King, the Senate majority leader, in District 39, and Dalya Attar in District 41. In the general election, Democrats gained a seat, in District 4 where Democrat Lara Westdorp defeated Republican incumbent William Folden, giving the party its biggest majority in 16 years.

== Background ==
Harris 50–60% 60–70% 70–80% 80-90% 90-100% / Trump 50–60% 60–70% 70–80%

In the 2024 presidential election, Kamala Harris won 34 districts, while Donald Trump won 13.

== Retirements ==
Map of retirements: Republican incumbent ran Democratic incumbent ran Republican incumbent retired Democratic incumbent retired or lost renomination

Five senators (3 Democrats and 2 Republicans) have announced their retirement.

=== Democrats ===
1. District 24: Joanne C. Benson retired.
2. District 28: Arthur Ellis retired to run for Congress in Maryland's 5th congressional district.
3. District 32: Pamela Beidle retired.

=== Republicans ===
1. District 31: Bryan Simonaire retired.
2. District 42: Chris West retired.

== Incumbents defeated ==
=== In primary elections ===
==== Democrats ====
1. District 39: Nancy J. King lost renomination to Amar Mukunda.
2. District 41: Dalya Attar lost renomination to Malcolm Ruff.

=== In the general election ===
==== Republicans ====
1. District 4: William Folden was defeated by Lara Westdorp.

== Predictions ==
=== Statewide ===
Source	Ranking	As of
Sabato's Crystal Ball	Safe D	January 22, 2026
State Navigate	Safe D	October 11, 2026

=== Competitive districts ===
District	Incumbent	Last result	State Navigate (Note: Ratings simplified from percentages: <60% = "Tilt"; 60–75% = "Lean"; 75–95% = "Likely"; >95% = "Safe") October 11, 2026	Result
4th	William Folden	57.54% R	Tilt R	Westdorp (flip)
31st	Bryan Simonaire (retiring)	71.25% R	Likely R	Kipke
37th	Johnny Mautz	60.80% R	Likely R	Mautz
42nd	Chris West (retiring)	95.51% R	Likely R	Ford

== Summary of results by district ==
Italics denote an open seat held by the incumbent party; bold text denotes a gain for a party.

District	2024 pres.	Incumbent	Party	Elected senator	Outcome
1st	R+44.7	Mike McKay	Rep	Mike McKay	Rep Hold
2nd	R+18.0	Paul Corderman	Rep	Paul Corderman	Rep Hold
3rd	D+32.9	Karen Lewis Young	Dem	Karen Lewis Young	Dem Hold
4th	R+6.2	William Folden	Rep	Lara Westdorp	Dem Gain
5th	R+21.3	Justin Ready	Rep	Justin Ready	Rep Hold
6th	R+17.9	Johnny Ray Salling	Rep	Johnny Ray Salling	Rep Hold
7th	R+16.0	J. B. Jennings	Rep	J. B. Jennings	Rep Hold
8th	D+25.8	Carl W. Jackson	Dem	Carl W. Jackson	Dem Hold
9th	D+26.0	Katie Fry Hester	Dem	Katie Fry Hester	Dem Hold
10th	D+55.3	Benjamin Brooks	Dem	Benjamin Brooks (Note: Ran unopposed in the general election.)	Dem Hold
11th	D+36.8	Shelly Hettleman	Dem	Shelly Hettleman	Dem Hold
12th	D+40.0	Clarence Lam	Dem	Clarence Lam	Dem Hold
13th	D+49.9	Guy Guzzone	Dem	Guy Guzzone	Dem Hold
14th	D+43.1	Craig Zucker	Dem	Craig Zucker	Dem Hold
15th	D+44.4	Brian Feldman	Dem	Brian Feldman	Dem Hold
16th	D+63.7	Sara N. Love	Dem	Sara N. Love	Dem Hold
17th	D+54.4	Cheryl Kagan	Dem	Cheryl Kagan	Dem Hold
18th	D+54.4	Jeff Waldstreicher	Dem	Jeff Waldstreicher	Dem Hold
19th	D+48.1	Benjamin F. Kramer	Dem	Benjamin F. Kramer	Dem Hold
20th	D+71.0	William C. Smith Jr.	Dem	William C. Smith Jr.	Dem Hold
21st	D+55.3	James Rosapepe	Dem	James Rosapepe	Dem Hold
22nd	D+70.5	Alonzo T. Washington	Dem	Alonzo T. Washington	Dem Hold
23rd	D+71.5	Ron Watson	Dem	Ron Watson	Dem Hold
24th	D+80.5	Joanne C. Benson	Dem	Tiffany Alston	Dem Hold
25th	D+85.1	Nick Charles	Dem	Nick Charles	Dem Hold
26th	D+79.7	C. Anthony Muse	Dem	C. Anthony Muse	Dem Hold
27th	D+22.5	Kevin Harris	Dem	Kevin Harris	Dem Hold
28th	D+39.5	Arthur Ellis	Dem	C. T. Wilson	Dem Hold
29th	R+15.1	Jack Bailey	Rep	Jack Bailey	Rep Hold
30th	D+17.7	Shaneka Henson	Dem	Shaneka Henson	Dem Hold
31st	R+10.6	Bryan Simonaire	Rep	Nic Kipke	Rep Hold
32nd	D+30.3	Pamela Beidle	Dem	Mark S. Chang	Dem Hold
33rd	D+18.5	Dawn Gile	Dem	Dawn Gile	Dem Hold
34th	D+6.4	Mary-Dulany James	Dem	Mary-Dulany James	Dem Hold
35th	R+35.7	Jason C. Gallion	Rep	Jason C. Gallion	Rep Hold
36th	R+23.0	Steve Hershey	Rep	Steve Hershey	Rep Hold
37th	R+8.8	Johnny Mautz	Rep	Johnny Mautz	Rep Hold
38th	R+16.1	Mary Beth Carozza	Rep	Mary Beth Carozza	Rep Hold
39th	D+46.1	Nancy J. King	Dem	Amar Mukunda	Dem Hold
40th	D+80.1	Antonio Hayes	Dem	Antonio Hayes	Dem Hold
41st	D+65.7	Dalya Attar	Dem	Malcolm Ruff	Dem Hold
42nd	R+8.8	Chris West	Rep	Kevin Ford	Rep Hold
43rd	D+75.5	Mary L. Washington	Dem	Mary L. Washington	Dem Hold
44th	D+45.3	Charles E. Sydnor III	Dem	Charles E. Sydnor III	Dem Hold
45th	D+76.6	Cory McCray	Dem	Cory McCray	Dem Hold
46th	D+62.3	Bill Ferguson	Dem	Bill Ferguson	Dem Hold
47th	D+71.4	Malcolm Augustine	Dem	Malcolm Augustine	Dem Hold

=== Closest races ===
Seats where the margin of victory was under 10%:

1. **State Senate district 4, 3.88%** **(gain)**
2. **State Senate district 6, 4.67%**
3. **State Senate district 42, 6.69%**
4. **State Senate district 31, 8.87%**
5. **State Senate district 29, 8.96%**
6. **State Senate district 2, 9.49%**

== District 1 ==
2026 Maryland Senate 1st District election
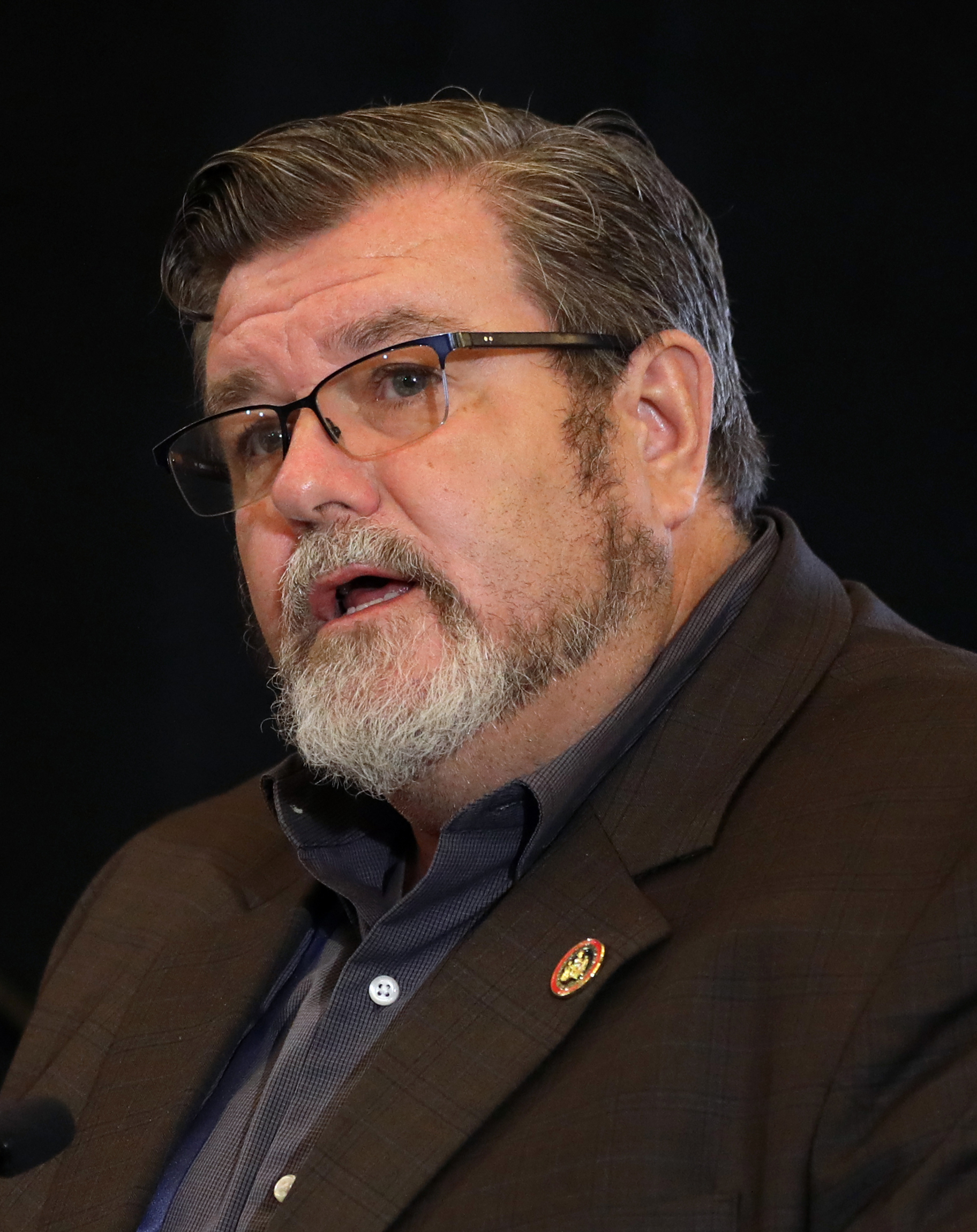

Candidate	Mike McKay	Ashley Emerick
Party	Republican	Democratic
Popular vote	30,691	14,419
Percentage	67.9%	31.9%
- Precinct results McKay: 50–60% 60–70% 70–80% 80–90% Emerick: 50–60%
State Senator before election
Mike McKay
Republican
Elected State Senator
Mike McKay
Republican

The 1st district encompasses all of Garrett and Allegany counties and west Washington County. One-term Republican incumbent Mike McKay won election to the seat with 73.4 percent of the vote in 2022.

=== Republican primary ===
==== Nominee ====
- Mike McKay, incumbent state senator

==== Endorsements ====
Mike McKay

Labor unions

- AFSCME Council 3
- Maryland State & DC AFL-CIO

Organizations

- Maryland Farm Bureau
- Maryland Right to Life

==== Fundraising ====
Campaign finance reports as of June 7, 2026
Candidate	Raised	Spent	Cash on hand
Mike McKay (R)	$134,032	$123,927	$28,121
Source: Maryland State Board of Elections

==== Results ====
Republican primary results
Party	Candidate	Votes	%
**Republican**	**Mike McKay (incumbent)**	**10,986**	**100.00%**
Total votes		**10,986**	**100.00%**

=== Democratic primary ===
==== Nominee ====
- Ashley Emerick, business owner

==== Endorsements ====
Endorsements in bold were made after the primary elections.

Ashley Emerick

Labor unions

- Maryland State Education Association

Organizations

- Maryland National Organization for Women
- **Maryland Sierra Club**

==== Fundraising ====
Campaign finance reports as of June 7, 2026
Candidate	Raised	Spent	Cash on hand
Ashley Emerick (D)	$7,758	$5,901	$1,857
Source: Maryland State Board of Elections

==== Results ====
Democratic primary results
Party	Candidate	Votes	%
**Democratic**	**Ashley Emerick**	**5,078**	**100.00%**
Total votes		**5,078**	**100.00%**

=== General election ===
==== Fundraising ====
Campaign finance reports as of November 10, 2026
Candidate	Raised	Spent	Cash on hand
Mike McKay (R)	$200,295	$190,138	$25,673
Ashley Emerick (D)	$13,313	$12,708	$253
Source: Maryland State Board of Elections

==== Results ====
2026 Maryland Senate 1st District election
Party	Candidate	Votes	%	±%
**Republican**	**Mike McKay (incumbent)**	**30,691**	**67.95%**	**−5.42%**
Democratic	Ashley Emerick	14,419	31.92%	+5.46%
Write-in		58	0.13%	-0.04%
Total votes		**45,168**	**100.00%**	

== District 2 ==
2026 Maryland Senate 2nd District election
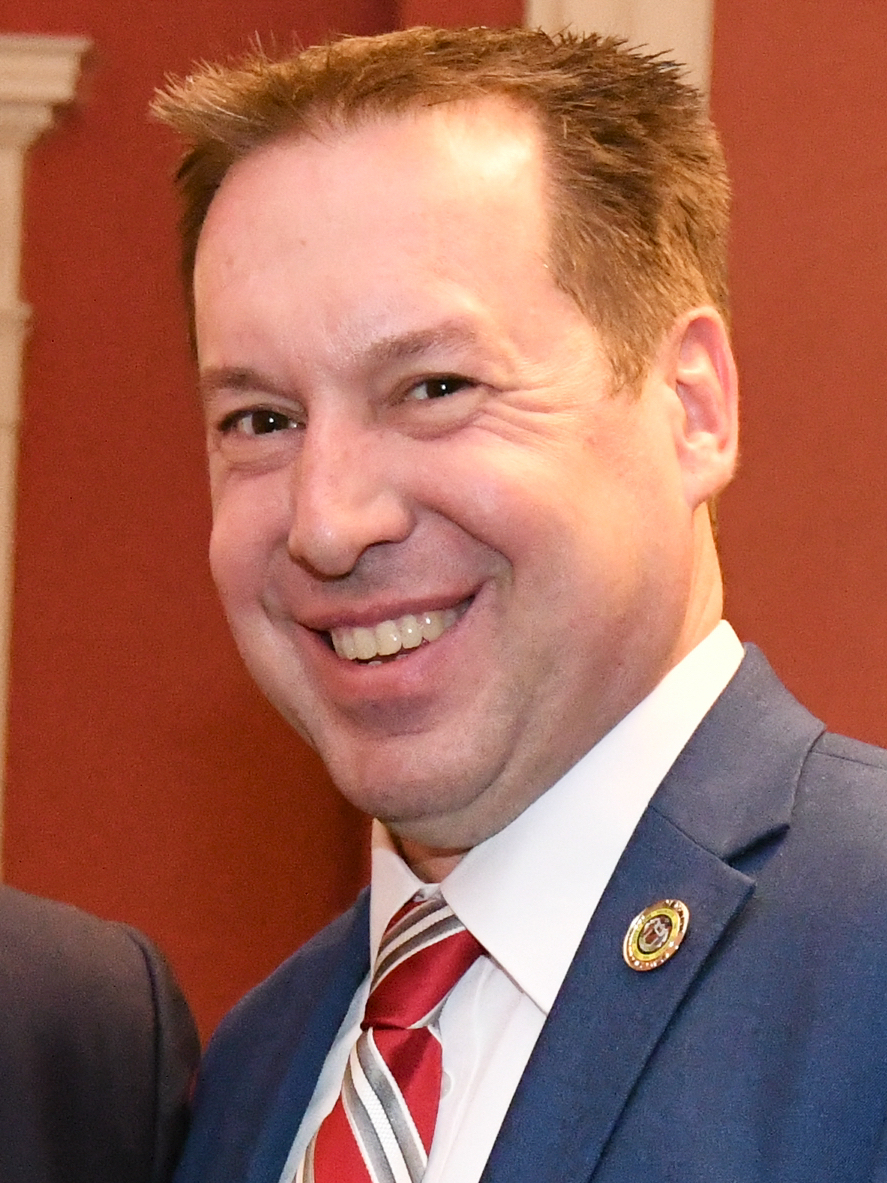

Candidate	Paul Corderman	Eric Van Buren
Party	Republican	Democratic
Popular vote	23,212	19,183
Percentage	54.7%	45.2%
- Precinct results Corderman: 50–60% 60–70% 70–80% Van Buren: 50–60% 60–70% 70–80% 80–90%
State Senator before election
Paul Corderman
Republican
Elected State Senator
Paul Corderman
Republican

The 2nd district encompasses east Washington County, including Hagerstown, and north Frederick County. One-term Republican incumbent Paul D. Corderman won election to the seat with 63.8 percent of the vote in 2022.

=== Republican primary ===
==== Nominee ====
- Paul D. Corderman, incumbent state senator

==== Endorsements ====
Paul Corderman

Organizations

- Maryland Farm Bureau
- Maryland Right to Life

==== Fundraising ====
Campaign finance reports as of June 7, 2026
Candidate	Raised	Spent	Cash on hand
Paul Corderman (R)	$148,689	$67,784	$97,919
Source: Maryland State Board of Elections

==== Results ====
Republican primary results
Party	Candidate	Votes	%
**Republican**	**Paul Corderman (incumbent)**	**6,588**	**100.00%**
Total votes		**6,588**	**100.00%**

=== Democratic primary ===
==== Nominee ====
- Eric Van Buren, paralegal

==== Endorsements ====
Endorsements in bold were made after the primary elections.

Eric Van Buren

Labor unions

- **Maryland State Education Association**

==== Fundraising ====
Campaign finance reports as of June 7, 2026
Candidate	Raised	Spent	Cash on hand
Eric Van Buren (D)	$4,808	$1,804	$3,004
Source: Maryland State Board of Elections

==== Results ====
Democratic primary results
Party	Candidate	Votes	%
**Democratic**	**Eric Van Buren**	**6,273**	**100.00%**
Total votes		**6,273**	**100.00%**

=== General election ===
==== Fundraising ====
Campaign finance reports as of November 10, 2026
Candidate	Raised	Spent	Cash on hand
Paul Corderman (R)	$164,123	$166,551	$14,586
Eric Van Buren (D) (Note: As of last reported on August 18, 2026)	$5,373	$2,527	$2,846
Source: Maryland State Board of Elections

==== Results ====
2026 Maryland Senate 2nd District election
Party	Candidate	Votes	%	±%
**Republican**	**Paul Corderman (incumbent)**	**23,212**	**54.69%**	**−9.15%**
Democratic	Eric Van Buren	19,183	45.20%	+9.12%
Write-in		45	0.11%	+0.03%
Total votes		**42,440**	**100.00%**	

== District 3 ==
2026 Maryland Senate 3rd District election
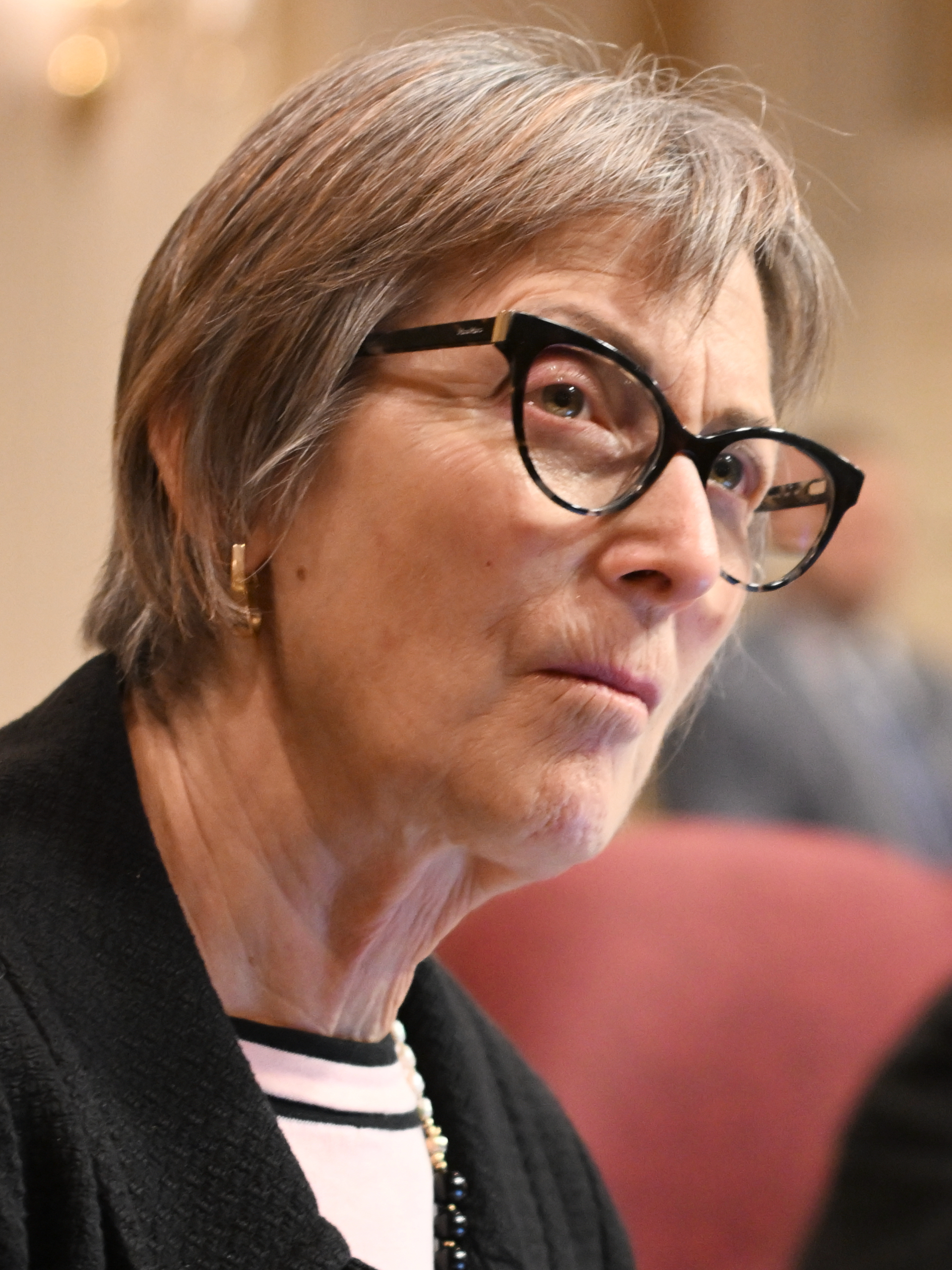

Candidate	Karen Lewis Young	Shelley Aloi
Party	Democratic	Republican
Popular vote	36,337	12,583
Percentage	74.2%	25.7%
- Precinct results Lewis Young: 60–70% 70–80% 80–90%
State Senator before election
Karen Lewis Young
Democratic
Elected State Senator
Karen Lewis Young
Democratic

The 3rd district encompasses the city of Frederick. One-term Democratic incumbent Karen Lewis Young won election to the seat with 66.5 percent of the vote in 2022.

=== Democratic primary ===
==== Nominee ====
- Karen Lewis Young, incumbent state senator

==== Endorsements ====
Karen Lewis Young

Statewide officials

- Wes Moore, Maryland governor (2023–present)

Labor unions

- AFSCME Council 3
- LIUNA Philadelphia/Baltimore/Washington Laborers' District Council
- Maryland State Education Association
- Service Employees International Union Local 500

Organizations

- CASA in Action
- Chesapeake Climate Action Network
- Clean Water Action
- Humane World Action Fund
- Maryland Farm Bureau
- Maryland League of Conservation Voters
- Maryland National Organization for Women
- Maryland Sierra Club
- Moms Demand Action

==== Fundraising ====
Campaign finance reports as of June 7, 2026
Candidate	Raised	Spent	Cash on hand
Karen Lewis Young (D)	$129,788	$39,305	$84,953
Source: Maryland State Board of Elections

==== Results ====
Democratic primary results
Party	Candidate	Votes	%
Democratic	Karen Lewis Young (incumbent)	11,215	100.00%
Total votes		11,215	100.00%

=== Republican primary ===
==== Nominee ====
- Shelley Aloi, former Frederick city alder and candidate for lieutenant governor in 2014

==== Withdrawn ====
- Angela McIntosh, scientist and nominee for this district in 2022 (running for state delegate)

==== Endorsements ====
Shelley Aloi

Organizations

- Maryland Right to Life

==== Fundraising ====
Campaign finance reports as of June 7, 2026
Candidate	Raised	Spent	Cash on hand
Shelley Aloi (R)	<$1,000	<$1,000	N/A
Source: Maryland State Board of Elections

==== Results ====
Republican primary results
Party	Candidate	Votes	%
Republican	Shelley Aloi	3,375	100.00%
Total votes		3,375	100.00%

=== General election ===
==== Fundraising ====
Campaign finance reports as of November 10, 2026
Candidate	Raised	Spent	Cash on hand
Karen Lewis Young (D)	$151,189	$112,586	$33,074
Shelley Aloi (R)	$2,845	$1,746	$24
Source: Maryland State Board of Elections

==== Results ====
2026 Maryland Senate 3rd District election
Party	Candidate	Votes	%	±%
Democratic	Karen Lewis Young (incumbent)	36,337	74.19%	+7.71%
Republican	Shelley Aloi	12,583	25.69%	−7.67%
Write-in		59	0.12%	+0.06%
Total votes		48,979	100.00%	

== District 4 ==
2026 Maryland Senate 4th District election

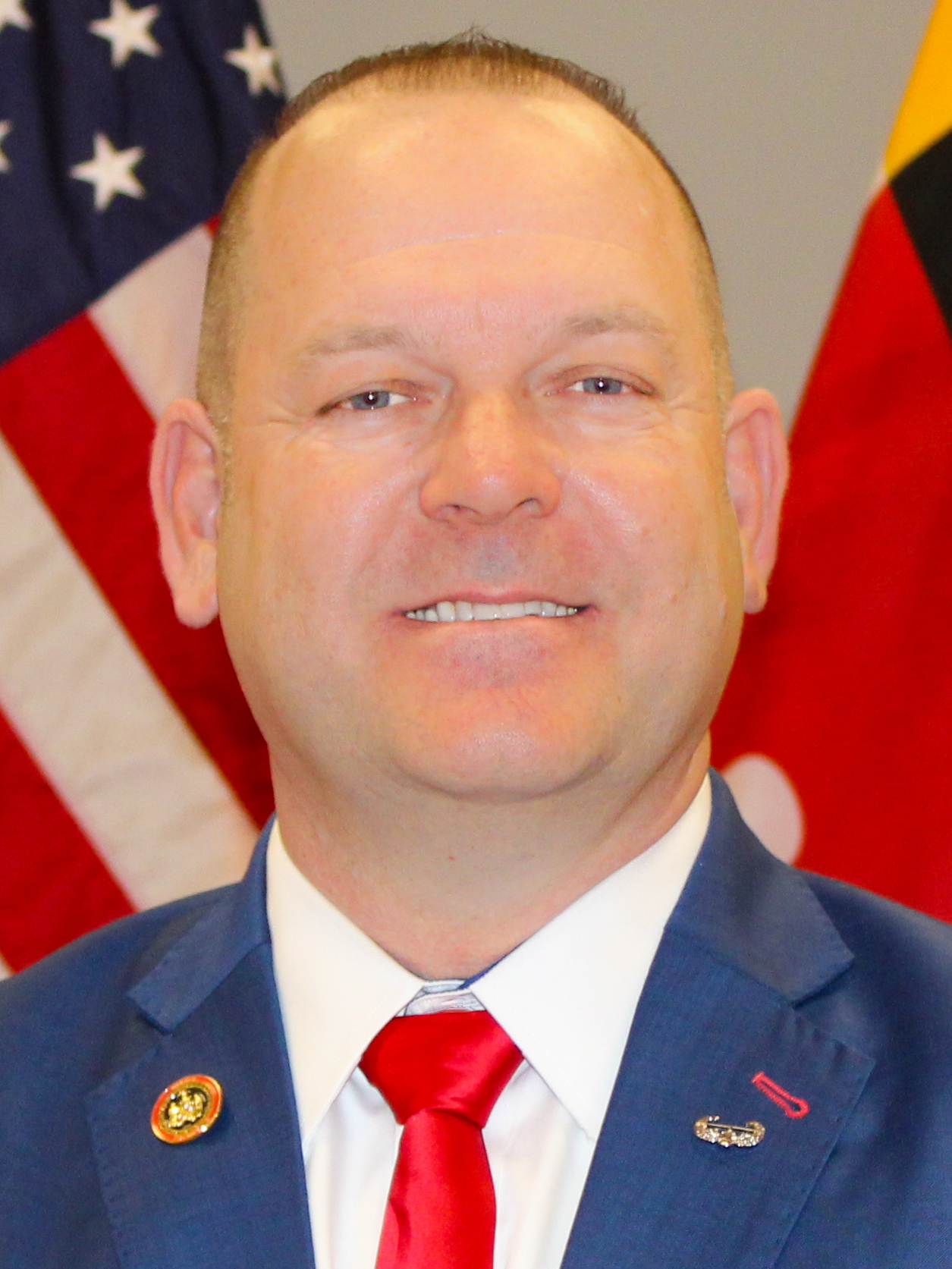
Candidate	Lara Westdorp	William Folden
Party	Democratic	Republican
Popular vote	30,870	28,565
Percentage	51.9%	48.0%
- Precinct results Westdorp: 50–60% 60–70% 70–80% Folden: 50–60% 60–70% 70–80%
State Senator before election
William Folden
Republican
Elected State Senator
Lara Westdorp
Democratic

The 4th district encompasses most of Frederick County. One-term Republican incumbent William Folden won election to the seat with 57.5 percent of the vote in 2022.

=== Republican primary ===
==== Nominee ====
- William Folden, incumbent state senator

==== Endorsements ====
William Folden

State legislators

- April Fleming Miller, state delegate for this district (2023–present)
- Jesse Pippy, state delegate for this district (2019–present)

Organizations

- Maryland Farm Bureau
- Maryland Right to Life

==== Fundraising ====
Campaign finance reports as of June 7, 2026
Candidate	Raised	Spent	Cash on hand
William Folden (R)	$128,489	$68,285	$79,203
Source: Maryland State Board of Elections

==== Results ====
Republican primary results
Party	Candidate	Votes	%
**Republican**	**William Folden (incumbent)**	**8,674**	**100.00%**
Total votes		**8,674**	**100.00%**

=== Democratic primary ===
==== Nominee ====
- Lara Westdorp, former chief of staff to state senator Ronald N. Young

==== Endorsements ====
Endorsements in bold were made after the primary elections.

Lara Westdorp

Statewide officials

- Wes Moore, Maryland governor (2023–present)

Labor unions

- Maryland State & DC AFL-CIO
- Maryland State Education Association
- United Food and Commercial Workers Local 1994 MCGEO

Organizations

- CASA in Action
- **Clean Water Action**
- **Maryland League of Conservation Voters**
- Maryland National Organization for Women
- Maryland Sierra Club
- Moms Demand Action
- Third Act Maryland

==== Fundraising ====
Campaign finance reports as of June 7, 2026
Candidate	Raised	Spent	Cash on hand
Lara Westdorp (D)	$42,739	$8,673	$26,900
Source: Maryland State Board of Elections

==== Results ====
Democratic primary results
Party	Candidate	Votes	%
**Democratic**	**Lara Westdorp**	**9,548**	**100.00%**
Total votes		**9,548**	**100.00%**

=== General election ===
==== Fundraising ====
Campaign finance reports as of November 10, 2026
Candidate	Raised	Spent	Cash on hand
William Folden (R)	$322,014	$161,396	$103,866
Lara Westdorp (D)	$146,499	$78,010	$4,624
Source: Maryland State Board of Elections

==== Results ====
2026 Maryland Senate 4th District election
Party	Candidate	Votes	%	±%
**Democratic**	**Lara Westdorp**	**30,870**	**51.90%**	**+9.54%**
Republican	William Folden (incumbent)	28,565	48.02%	−9.52%
Write-in		46	0.08%	-0.03%
Total votes		**59,481**	**100.00%**	

== District 5 ==
2026 Maryland Senate 5th District election
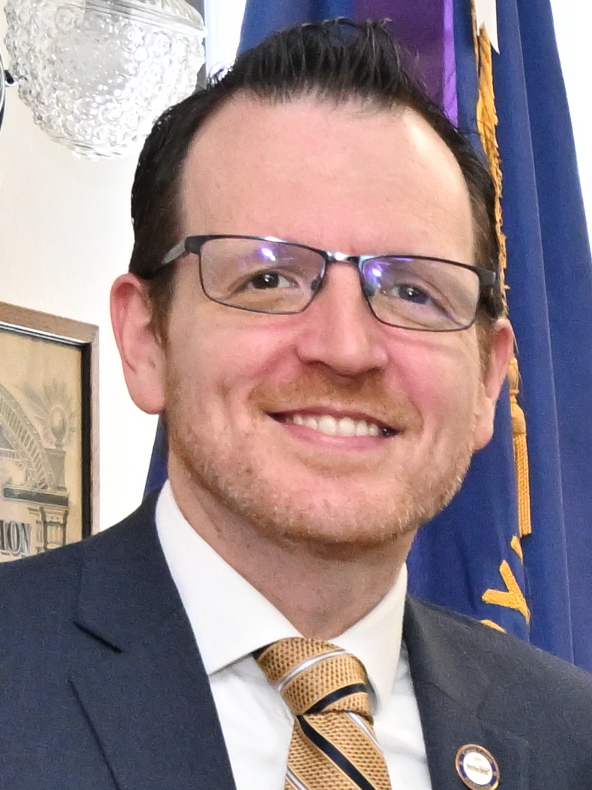

Candidate	Justin Ready	Gary Foote
Party	Republican	Democratic
Popular vote	32,761	22,926
Percentage	58.8%	41.1%
- Precinct results Ready: 50–60% 60–70% 70–80% >90% Foote: 50–60%
State Senator before election
Justin Ready
Republican
Elected State Senator
Justin Ready
Republican

The 5th district encompasses most of Carroll County, including Eldersburg and Westminster. Three-term Republican incumbent Justin Ready won re-election to the seat with 96.1 percent of the vote in 2022.

=== Republican primary ===
==== Nominee ====
- Justin Ready, incumbent state senator

==== Endorsements ====
Justin Ready

State legislators

- April Rose, state delegate from the 5th district (2015–present)
- Chris Tomlinson, state delegate from the 5th district (2023–present)

Organizations

- Maryland Farm Bureau
- Maryland Right to Life

==== Fundraising ====
Campaign finance reports as of June 7, 2026
Candidate	Raised	Spent	Cash on hand
Justin Ready (R)	$341,729	$198,953	$220,969
Source: Maryland State Board of Elections

==== Results ====
Republican primary results
Party	Candidate	Votes	%
**Republican**	**Justin Ready (incumbent)**	**9,642**	**100.00%**
Total votes		**9,642**	**100.00%**

=== Democratic primary ===
==== Nominee ====
- Gary Foote, retired teacher

==== Endorsements ====
Endorsements in bold were made after the primary elections.

Gary Foote

Labor unions

- Maryland State Education Association

Organizations

- **Maryland Sierra Club**
- Moms Demand Action

==== Fundraising ====
Campaign finance reports as of June 7, 2026
Candidate	Raised	Spent	Cash on hand
Gary Foote (D)	$3,908	$2,115	$1,685
Source: Maryland State Board of Elections

==== Results ====
Democratic primary results
Party	Candidate	Votes	%
**Democratic**	**Gary Foote**	**5,997**	**100.00%**
Total votes		**5,997**	**100.00%**

=== General election ===
==== Fundraising ====
Campaign finance reports as of November 10, 2026
Candidate	Raised	Spent	Cash on hand
Justin Ready (R)	$394,472	$304,321	$173,850
Gary Foote (D)	$8,072 (Note: $3,400 of this total was self-funded by Foote.)	$5,345	$2,335
Source: Maryland State Board of Elections

==== Results ====
2026 Maryland Senate 5th District election
Party	Candidate	Votes	%	±%
**Republican**	**Justin Ready (incumbent)**	**32,761**	**58.79%**	**−37.32%**
Democratic	Gary Foote	22,926	41.14%	N/A
Write-in		39	0.07%	-3.82%
Total votes		**55,726**	**100.00%**	

== District 6 ==
2026 Maryland Senate 6th District election
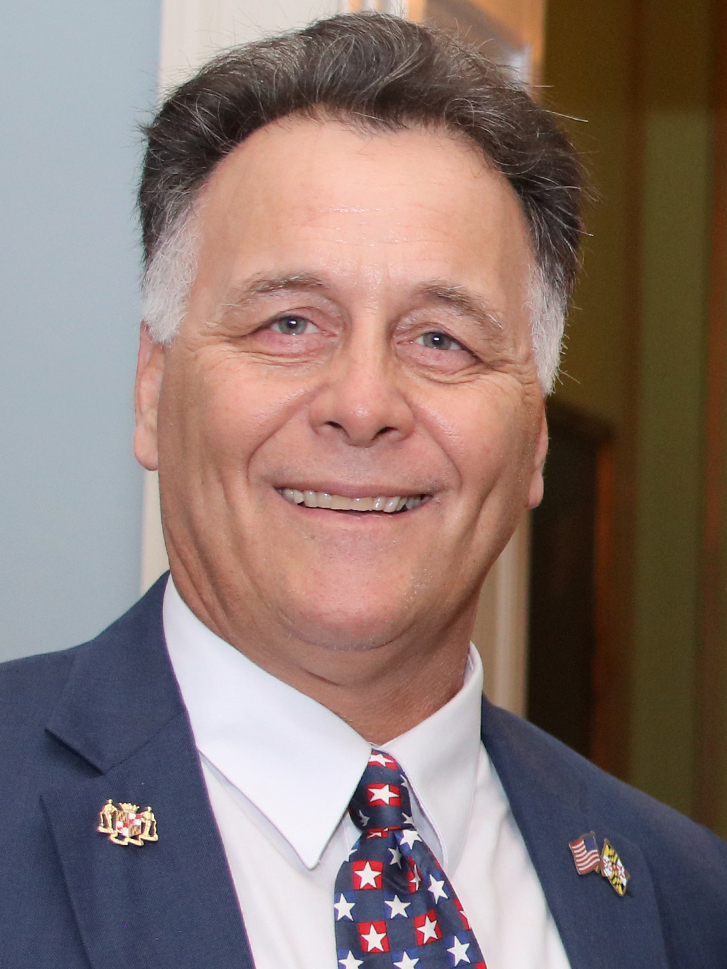

Candidate	Johnny Ray Salling	Justin Holliday
Party	Republican	Democratic
Popular vote	18,068	16,453
Percentage	52.2%	47.6%
- Precinct results Salling: 50–60% 60–70% 70–80% Holliday: 50–60% 60–70% 70–80% >90%
State Senator before election
Johnny Ray Salling
Republican
Elected State Senator
Johnny Ray Salling
Republican

The 6th district encompasses southeast Baltimore County, including Dundalk, Essex, and Edgemere. Three-term Republican incumbent Johnny Ray Salling won re-election to the seat with 61.2 percent of the vote in 2022.

=== Republican primary ===
==== Nominee ====
- Johnny Ray Salling, incumbent state senator

==== Eliminated in primary ====
- Daniel Eisenhart, dental technician

==== Endorsements ====
Johnny Ray Salling

Organizations

- Maryland Farm Bureau
- Maryland Right to Life
- NRA Political Victory Fund

==== Fundraising ====
Campaign finance reports as of June 7, 2026
Candidate	Raised	Spent	Cash on hand
Daniel Eisenhart (R)	$1,283	$1,123	$160
Johnny Ray Salling (R)	$48,601	$21,770	$61,472
Source: Maryland State Board of Elections

==== Results ====
Results by precinct Salling: 50–60%; 60–70%; 70–80%; Eisenhart: 50–60%

Republican primary results
Party	Candidate	Votes	%
Republican	Johnny Ray Salling (incumbent)	3,176	58.47%
Republican	Daniel Eisenhart	2,256	41.53%
Total votes		5,432	100.00%

=== Democratic primary ===
==== Nominee ====
- Justin Holliday, social studies teacher and member of the Baltimore County Democratic Central Committee

==== Endorsements ====
Justin Holliday

Statewide officials

- Wes Moore, Maryland governor (2023–present)

Labor unions

- Maryland State Education Association

==== Results ====
Democratic primary results
Party	Candidate	Votes	%
Democratic	Justin Holliday	4,686	100.00%
Total votes		4,686	100.00%

=== General election ===
==== Fundraising ====
Campaign finance reports as of November 10, 2026
Candidate	Raised	Spent	Cash on hand
Johnny Ray Salling (R)	$58,201	$32,586	$60,275
Justin Holliday (D)	$5,562	$2,063	$2,172
Source: Maryland State Board of Elections

==== Results ====
2026 Maryland Senate 6th District election
Party	Candidate	Votes	%	±%
Republican	Johnny Ray Salling (incumbent)	18,068	52.23%	−8.93%
Democratic	Justin Holliday	16,453	47.56%	+8.87%
Write-in		73	0.21%	+0.06%
Total votes		34,594	100.00%	

== District 7 ==
2026 Maryland Senate 7th District election
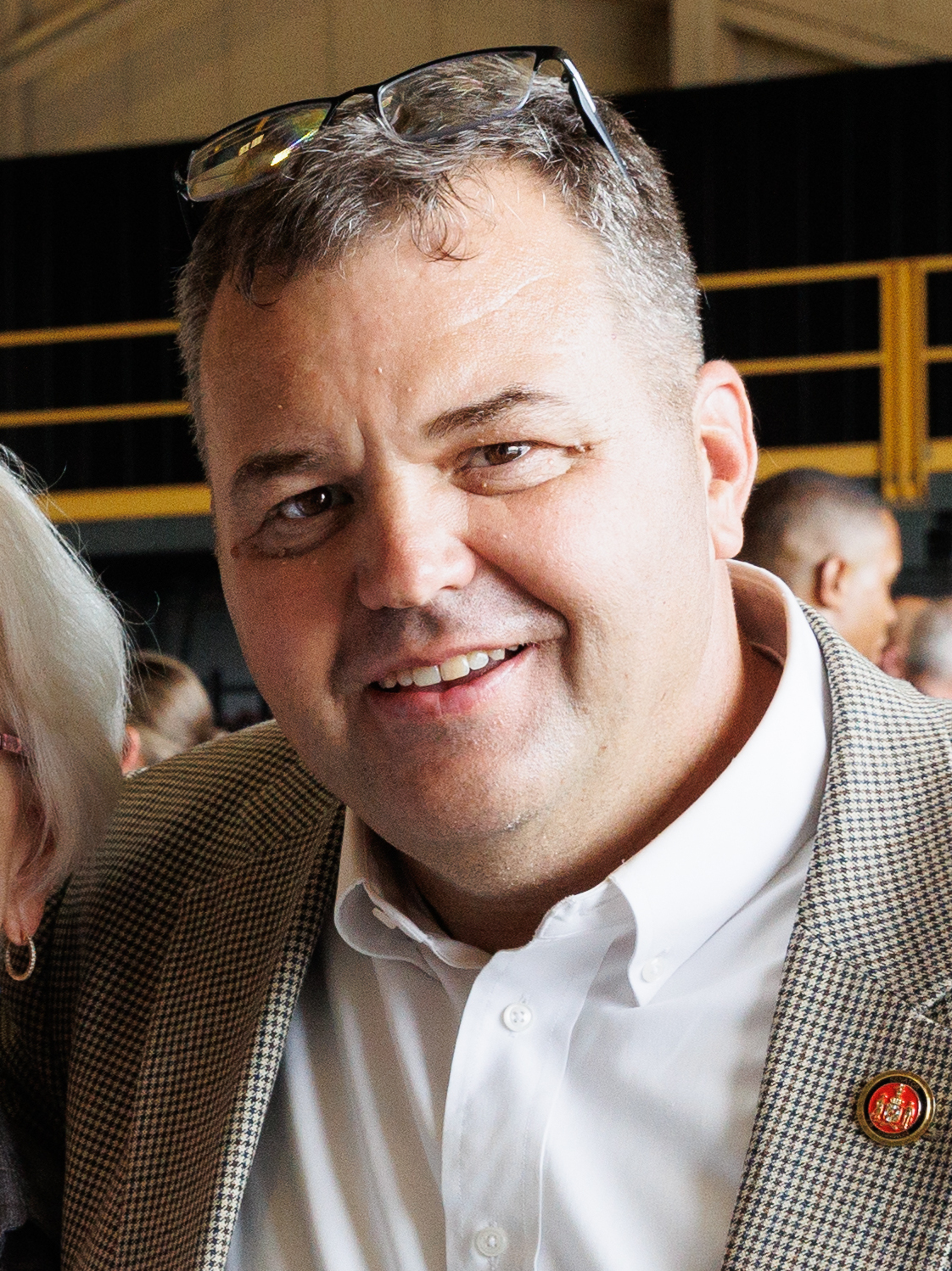

Candidate	J. B. Jennings	Bill Geibler
Party	Republican	Democratic
Popular vote	31,518	24,170
Percentage	56.5%	43.4%
- Precinct results Jennings: 50–60% 60–70% 70–80% Geibler: 50–60% 60–70% 70–80%
State Senator before election
J. B. Jennings
Republican
Elected State Senator
J. B. Jennings
Republican

The 7th district runs along the border of Baltimore and Harford counties. Four-term Republican incumbent J. B. Jennings won re-election to the seat with 96.0 percent of the vote in 2022.

=== Republican primary ===
==== Nominee ====
- J. B. Jennings, incumbent state senator

==== Declined ====
- Lauren Arikan state delegate from district 7B (2019–present) (running for re-election)
- Ryan Nawrocki, state delegate from district 7A (2023-present) (running for re-election)
- Kathy Szeliga, state delegate from district 7A (2011–present) (running for re-election)

==== Endorsements ====
J. B. Jennings

Organizations

- Maryland Farm Bureau
- Maryland Right to Life

==== Fundraising ====
Campaign finance reports as of June 7, 2026
Candidate	Raised	Spent	Cash on hand
J. B. Jennings (R)	$306,985	$178,151	$502,200
Source: Maryland State Board of Elections

==== Results ====
Republican primary results
Party	Candidate	Votes	%
Republican	J. B. Jennings (incumbent)	9,045	100.00%
Total votes		9,045	100.00%

=== Democratic primary ===
==== Nominee ====
- Bill Geibler, marketing executive

==== Endorsements ====
Bill Geibler

Organizations

- Moms Demand Action

==== Fundraising ====
Campaign finance reports as of June 7, 2026
Candidate	Raised	Spent	Cash on hand
Bill Geibler (D)	$1,000	$0	$1,000
Source: Maryland State Board of Elections

==== Results ====
Democratic primary results
Party	Candidate	Votes	%
Democratic	Bill Geibler	7,537	100.00%
Total votes		7,537	100.00%

=== General election ===
==== Fundraising ====
Campaign finance reports as of November 10, 2026
Candidate	Raised	Spent	Cash on hand
J. B. Jennings (R)	$390,480	$296,348	$467,498
Bill Geibler (D)	$4,438	$4,112	$326
Source: Maryland State Board of Elections

==== Results ====
2026 Maryland Senate 7th District election
Party	Candidate	Votes	%	±%
Republican	J. B. Jennings (incumbent)	31,518	56.54%	−39.48%
Democratic	Bill Geibler	24,170	43.36%	N/A
Write-in		53	0.10%	-3.88%
Total votes		55,741	100.00%	

== District 8 ==
2026 Maryland Senate 8th District election
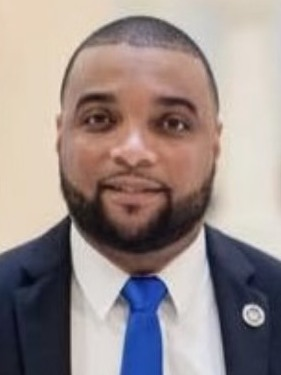

Candidate	Carl W. Jackson	Yahu Blackwell
Party	Democratic	Republican
Popular vote	28,135	11,321
Percentage	71.2%	28.6%
- Precinct results Jackson: 50–60% 60–70% 70–80% 80–90% >90%
State Senator before election
Carl W. Jackson
Democratic
Elected State Senator
Carl W. Jackson
Democratic

The 8th district consists of part of Baltimore County, including Perry Hall and Parkville. Democratic state delegate Carl W. Jackson was appointed to the seat by Governor Wes Moore to succeed Kathy Klausmeier, who was elected by the Baltimore County Council to serve the remainder of Johnny Olszewski's term as Baltimore County Executive. Klausmeier won re-election to a sixth term with 66.3 percent of the vote in 2022.

=== Democratic primary ===
==== Nominee ====
- Carl W. Jackson, incumbent state senator

==== Endorsements ====
Endorsements in bold were made after the primary elections.

Carl Jackson

Statewide officials

- Wes Moore, Maryland governor (2023–present)

Labor unions

- AFSCME Council 3
- LIUNA Philadelphia/Baltimore/Washington Laborers' District Council
- Maryland State & DC AFL-CIO
- **Maryland State Education Association**
- Service Employees International Union Local 500

Organizations

- Maryland Sierra Club

Newspapers

- Baltimore Afro-American

==== Fundraising ====
Campaign finance reports as of June 7, 2026
Candidate	Raised	Spent	Cash on hand
Carl Jackson (D)	$238,369	$105,181	$148,154
Source: Maryland State Board of Elections

==== Results ====
Democratic primary results
Party	Candidate	Votes	%
**Democratic**	**Carl W. Jackson (incumbent)**	**8,447**	**100.00%**
Total votes		**8,447**	**100.00%**

=== Republican primary ===
==== Nominee ====
- Yahu Blackwell, professional boxer

==== Endorsements ====
Yahu Blackwell

Organizations

- Maryland Right to Life

==== Fundraising ====
Campaign finance reports as of June 7, 2026
Candidate	Raised	Spent	Cash on hand
Yahu Blackwell (R)	$0	$8,450	$1,834
Source: Maryland State Board of Elections

==== Results ====
Republican primary results
Party	Candidate	Votes	%
**Republican**	**Yahu Blackwell**	**2,420**	**100.00%**
Total votes		**2,420**	**100.00%**

=== General election ===
==== Fundraising ====
Campaign finance reports as of November 10, 2026
Candidate	Raised	Spent	Cash on hand
Carl Jackson (D)	$278,896	$137,371	$156,491
Yahu Blackwell (R)	$2,844 (Note: This amount in its totality was self-funded by Blackwell)	$17,065	$(5,621)
Source: Maryland State Board of Elections

==== Results ====
2026 Maryland Senate 8th District election
Party	Candidate	Votes	%	±%
**Democratic**	**Carl W. Jackson (incumbent)**	**28,135**	**71.18%**	**+4.92%**
Republican	Yahu Blackwell	11,321	28.64%	−4.98%
Write-in		71	0.18%	+0.06%
Total votes		**39,527**	**100.00%**	

== District 9 ==
2026 Maryland Senate 9th District election
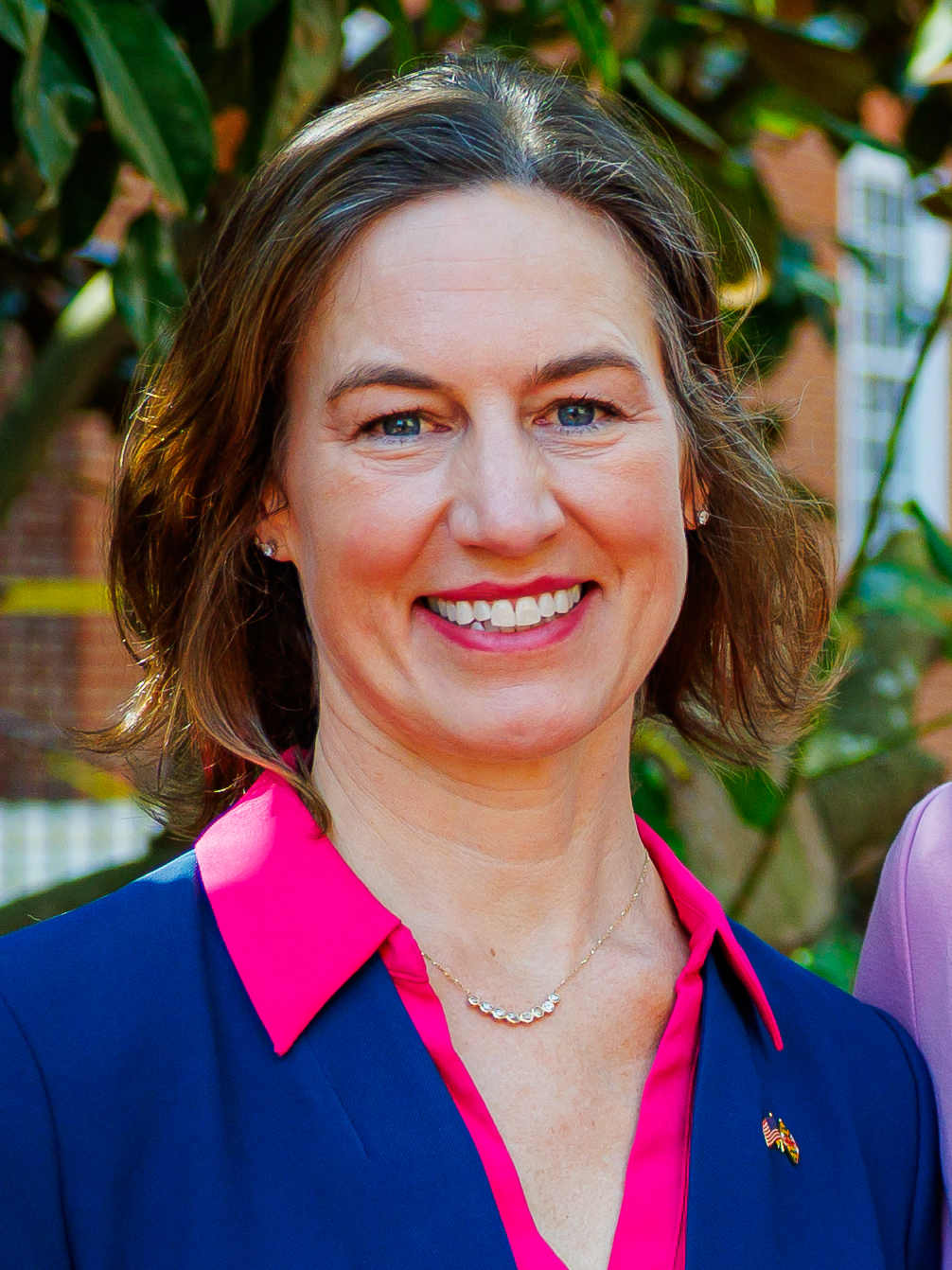

Candidate	Katie Fry Hester	Ben Hightower
Party	Democratic	Republican
Popular vote	37,614	17,961
Percentage	67.6%	32.3%
- Precinct results Hester: 50–60% 60–70% 70–80% 80–90% Hightower: 50–60%
State Senator before election
Katie Fry Hester
Democratic
Elected State Senator
Katie Fry Hester
Democratic

The 9th district encompasses north Howard County, including Ellicott City and Clarksville, and Damascus in Montgomery County. Two-term Democratic incumbent Katie Fry Hester won re-election to the seat with 57.9 percent of the vote in 2022.

=== Democratic primary ===
==== Nominee ====
- Katie Fry Hester, incumbent state senator

==== Endorsements ====
Endorsements in bold were made after the primary elections.

Katie Fry Hester

Statewide officials

- Wes Moore, Maryland governor (2023–present)

Labor unions

- AFSCME Council 3
- LIUNA Philadelphia/Baltimore/Washington Laborers' District Council
- Maryland State & DC AFL-CIO
- Maryland State Education Association
- Service Employees International Union Local 500

Organizations

- Maryland Farm Bureau
- Chesapeake Climate Action Network
- Maryland League of Conservation Voters
- Maryland Sierra Club
- **Moms Demand Action**
- Third Act Maryland

==== Fundraising ====
Campaign finance reports as of June 7, 2026
Candidate	Raised	Spent	Cash on hand
Katie Fry Hester (D)	$515,735	$252,592	$340,383
Source: Maryland State Board of Elections

==== Results ====
Democratic primary results
Party	Candidate	Votes	%
**Democratic**	**Katie Fry Hester (incumbent)**	**12,153**	**100.00%**
Total votes		**12,153**	**100.00%**

=== Republican primary ===
==== Nominee ====
- Ben Hightower, U.S. Navy veteran

==== Fundraising ====
Campaign finance reports as of June 7, 2026
Candidate	Raised	Spent	Cash on hand
Ben Hightower (R)	$10,597	$1,387	$9,210
Source: Maryland State Board of Elections

==== Results ====
Republican primary results
Party	Candidate	Votes	%
**Republican**	**Ben Hightower**	**3,071**	**100.00%**
Total votes		**3,071**	**100.00%**

=== General election ===
==== Fundraising ====
Campaign finance reports as of November 10, 2026
Candidate	Raised	Spent	Cash on hand
Katie Fry Hester (D)	$675,883	$584,699	$134,884
Ben Hightower (R)	$17,797	$5,841	$11,956
Source: Maryland State Board of Elections

==== Results ====
2026 Maryland Senate 9th District election
Party	Candidate	Votes	%	±%
**Democratic**	**Katie Fry Hester (incumbent)**	**37,614**	**67.59%**	**+9.67%**
Republican	Ben Hightower	17,961	32.28%	−9.72%
Write-in		73	0.13%	+0.05%
Total votes		**55,648**	**100.00%**	

== District 10 ==
2026 Maryland Senate 10th District election
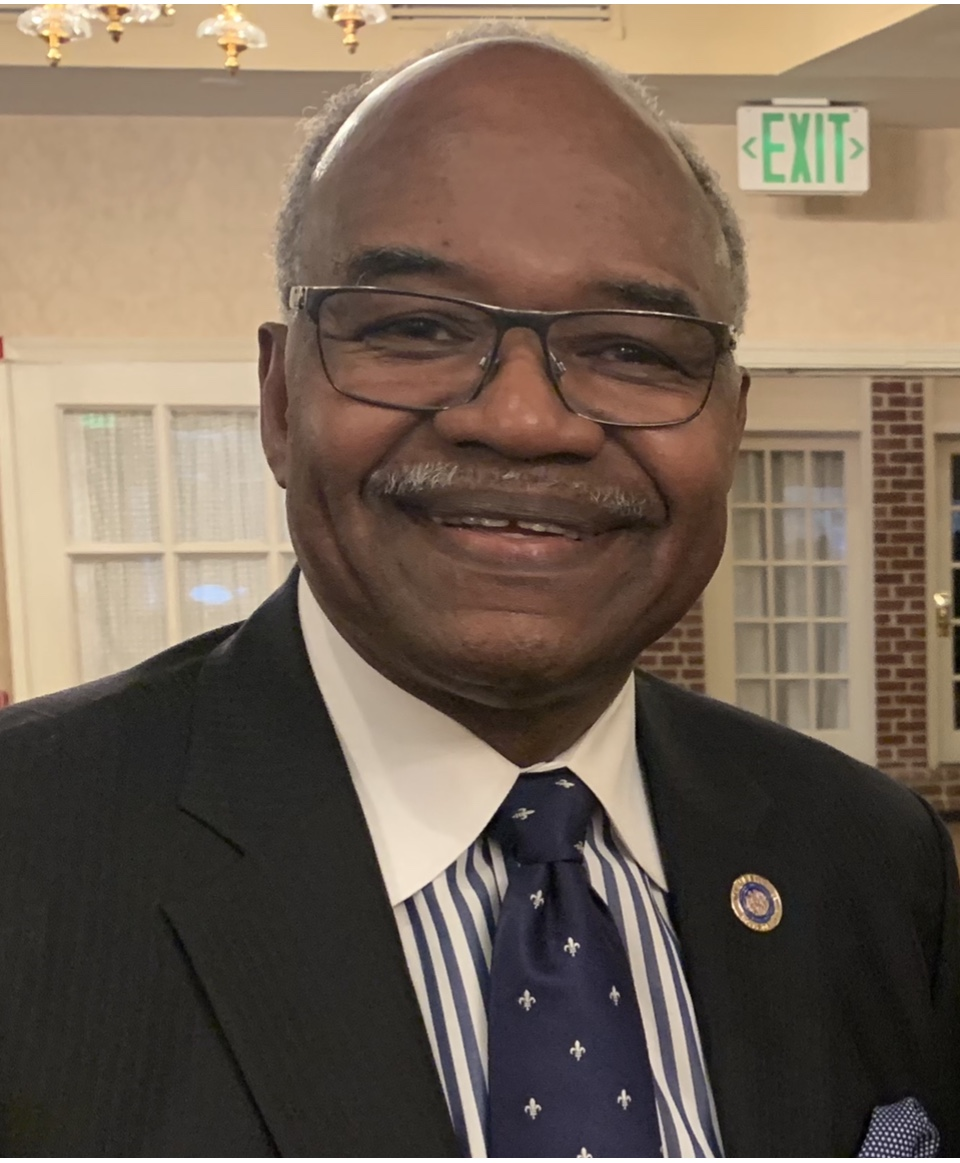
Candidate	Benjamin Brooks
Party	Democratic
Popular vote	40,046
Percentage	98.1%
State Senator before election
Benjamin Brooks
Democratic
Elected State Senator
Benjamin Brooks
Democratic

The 10th district encompasses east Baltimore County, including Randallstown and Reisterstown. One-term Democratic incumbent Benjamin Brooks won election to the seat with 78.6 percent of the vote in 2022.

=== Democratic primary ===
==== Nominee ====
- Benjamin Brooks, incumbent state senator

==== Endorsements ====
Benjamin Brooks

Statewide officials

- Wes Moore, Maryland governor (2023–present)

Labor unions

- AFSCME Council 3
- LIUNA Philadelphia/Baltimore/Washington Laborers' District Council
- Maryland State & DC AFL-CIO
- Service Employees International Union Local 500

Organizations

- Chesapeake Climate Action Network
- Maryland Farm Bureau
- Maryland League of Conservation Voters
- Maryland Sierra Club

Newspapers

- Baltimore Afro-American

==== Fundraising ====
Campaign finance reports as of May 12, 2026
Candidate	Raised	Spent	Cash on hand
Benjamin Brooks (D)	$121,402	$98,128	$68,815
Source: Maryland State Board of Elections

==== Results ====
Democratic primary results
Party	Candidate	Votes	%
Democratic	Benjamin Brooks (incumbent)	15,959	100.00%
Total votes		15,959	100.00%

=== General election ===
==== Fundraising ====
Campaign finance reports as of November 10, 2026
Candidate	Raised	Spent	Cash on hand
Benjamin Brooks (D)	$145,258	$131,754	$59,046
Source: Maryland State Board of Elections

==== Results ====
2026 Maryland Senate 10th District election
Party	Candidate	Votes	%	±%
Democratic	Benjamin Brooks (incumbent)	40,046	98.07%	+19.44%
Write-in		790	1.93%	+1.77%
Total votes		40,836	100.00%	

== District 11 ==
2026 Maryland Senate 11th District election
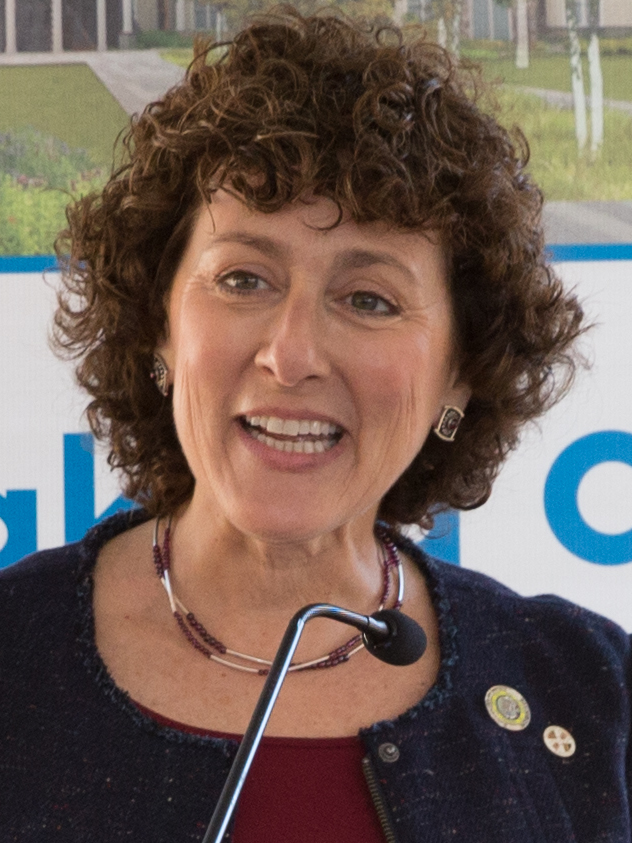

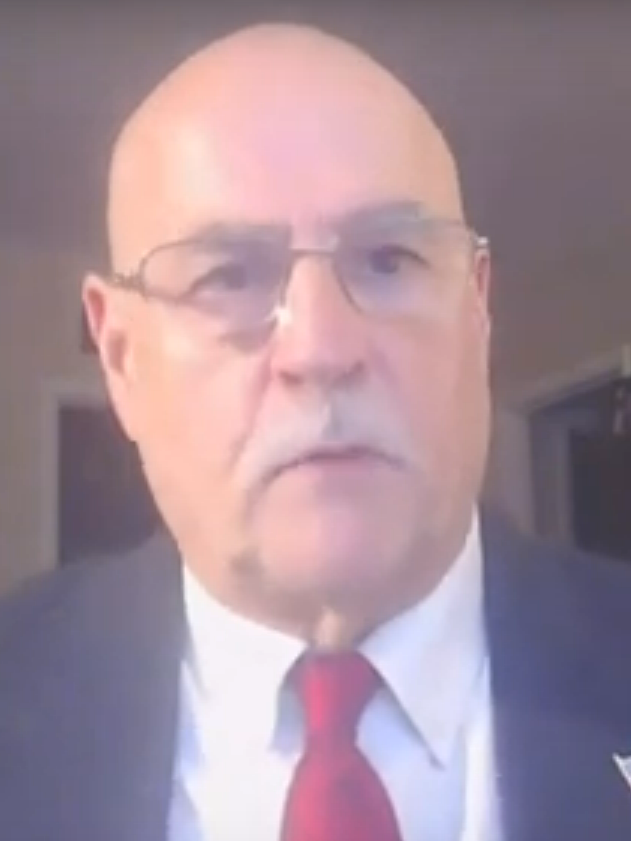
Candidate	Shelly Hettleman	Jim Simpson
Party	Democratic	Republican
Popular vote	37,812	11,668
Percentage	76.3%	23.6%
- Precinct results Hettleman: 50–60% 60–70% 70–80% 80–90% >90% Simpson: 50–60%
State Senator before election
Shelly Hettleman
Democratic
Elected State Senator
Shelly Hettleman
Democratic

The 11th district encompasses central Baltimore County, including Owings Mills, Pikesville, and Mays Chapel. One-term Democratic incumbent Shelly Hettleman won election to the seat with 71.5 percent of the vote in 2022.

=== Democratic primary ===
==== Nominee ====
- Shelly Hettleman, incumbent state senator

==== Endorsements ====
Shelly Hettleman

Statewide officials

- Wes Moore, Maryland governor (2023–present)

Labor unions

- AFSCME Council 3
- LIUNA Philadelphia/Baltimore/Washington Laborers' District Council
- Maryland State & DC AFL-CIO
- Maryland State Education Association
- Service Employees International Union Local 500

Organizations

- CASA in Action
- Clean Water Action
- FreeState Equality
- Maryland Farm Bureau
- Maryland League of Conservation Voters
- Maryland National Organization for Women
- Maryland Sierra Club
- Moms Demand Action

Newspapers

- Baltimore Afro-American

==== Fundraising ====
Campaign finance reports as of June 7, 2026
Candidate	Raised	Spent	Cash on hand
Shelly Hettleman (D)	$203,433	$49,485	$213,193
Source: Maryland State Board of Elections

==== Results ====
Democratic primary results
Party	Candidate	Votes	%
Democratic	Shelly Hettleman (incumbent)	16,497	100.00%
Total votes		16,497	100.00%

=== Republican primary ===
==== Nominee ====
- Jim Simpson, investigative journalist, author, writer, activist, and candidate for MD-02 in 2020

==== Endorsements ====
Jim Simpson

Organizations

- Maryland Right to Life

==== Fundraising ====
Campaign finance reports as of June 7, 2026
Candidate	Raised	Spent	Cash on hand
Jim Simpson (R)	<$1,000	<$1,000	N/A
Source: Maryland State Board of Elections

==== Results ====
Republican primary results
Party	Candidate	Votes	%
Republican	Jim Simpson	2,409	100.00%
Total votes		2,409	100.00%

=== General election ===
==== Fundraising ====
Campaign finance reports as of November 10, 2026
Candidate	Raised	Spent	Cash on hand
Shelley Hettleman (D)	$294,429	$202,762	$151,711
Source: Maryland State Board of Elections

==== Results ====
2026 Maryland Senate 11th District election
Party	Candidate	Votes	%	±%
Democratic	Shelly Hettleman (incumbent)	37,812	76.34%	+4.88%
Republican	Jim Simpson	11,668	23.56%	−4.91%
Write-in		52	0.10%	+0.03%
Total votes		49,532	100.00%	

== District 12 ==
2026 Maryland Senate 12th District election
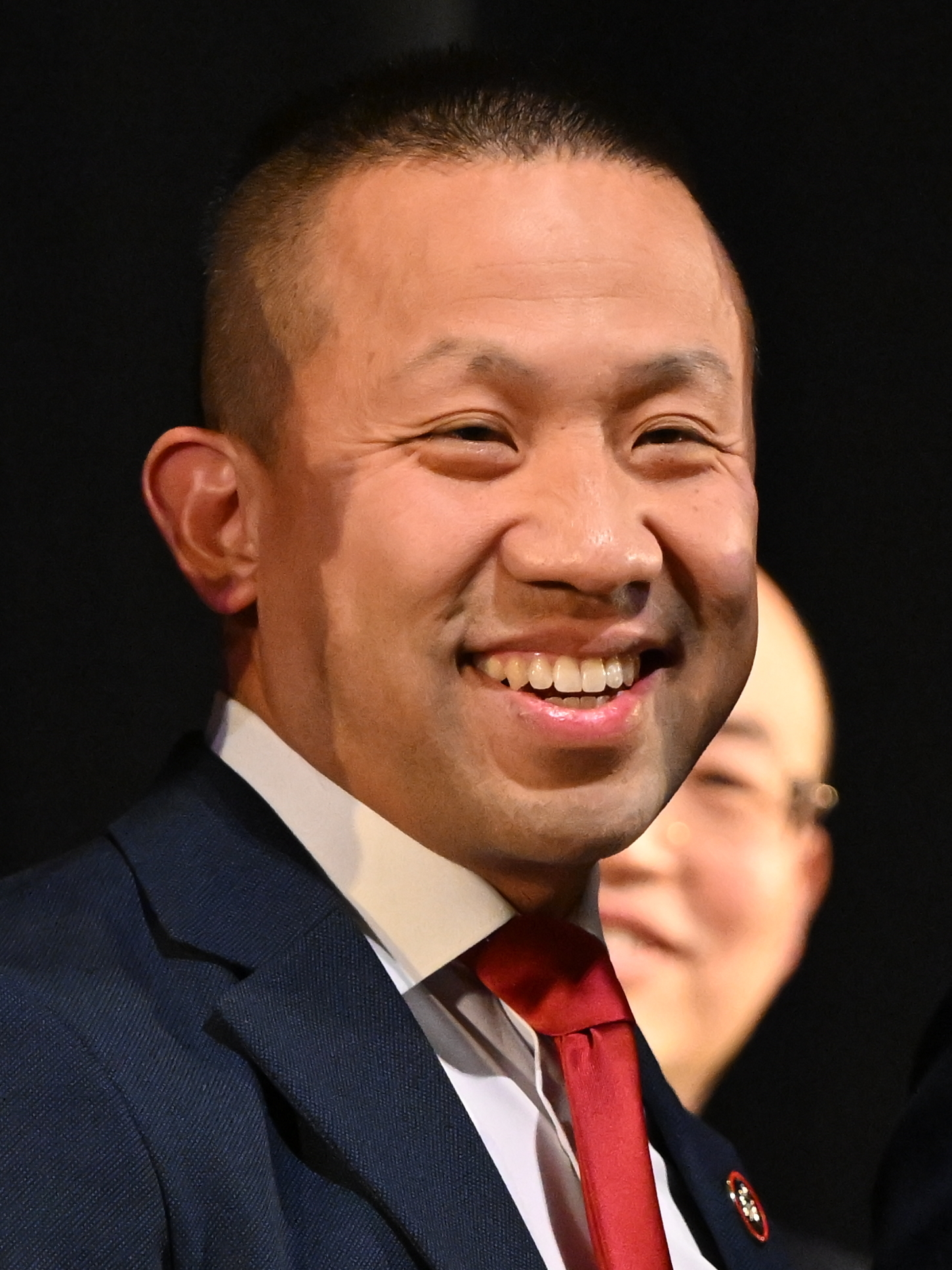
Candidate	Clarence Lam
Party	Democratic
Popular vote	40,139
Percentage	96.8%
State Senator before election
Clarence Lam
Democratic
Elected State Senator
Clarence Lam
Democratic

The 12th district encompasses parts of Howard and Anne Arundel counties, including Columbia, Brooklyn Park, and part of Glen Burnie. Two-term Democratic incumbent Clarence Lam won re-election to the seat with 70.0 percent of the vote in 2022.

=== Democratic primary ===
==== Nominee ====
- Clarence Lam, incumbent state senator

==== Endorsements ====
Clarence Lam

Statewide officials

- Wes Moore, Maryland governor (2023–present)

Labor unions

- AFSCME Council 3
- LIUNA Philadelphia/Baltimore/Washington Laborers' District Council
- Maryland State & DC AFL-CIO
- Maryland State Education Association
- Service Employees International Union Local 500
- United Food and Commercial Workers Local 1994 MCGEO

Organizations

- CASA in Action
- Maryland League of Conservation Voters
- Maryland Sierra Club

==== Fundraising ====
Campaign finance reports as of June 7, 2026
Candidate	Raised	Spent	Cash on hand
Clarence Lam (D)	$302,219	$193,261	$244,340
Source: Maryland State Board of Elections

==== Results ====
Democratic primary results
Party	Candidate	Votes	%
Democratic	Clarence Lam (incumbent)	12,923	100.00%
Total votes		12,923	100.00%

=== General election ===
==== Fundraising ====
Campaign finance reports as of November 10, 2026
Candidate	Raised	Spent	Cash on hand
Clarence Lam (D)	$361,081	$226,043	$270,420
Source: Maryland State Board of Elections

==== Results ====
2026 Maryland Senate 12th District election
Party	Candidate	Votes	%	±%
Democratic	Clarence Lam (incumbent)	40,139	96.79%	+26.82%
Write-in		1,332	3.21%	+3.11%
Total votes		41,471	100.00%	

== District 13 ==
2026 Maryland Senate 13th District election
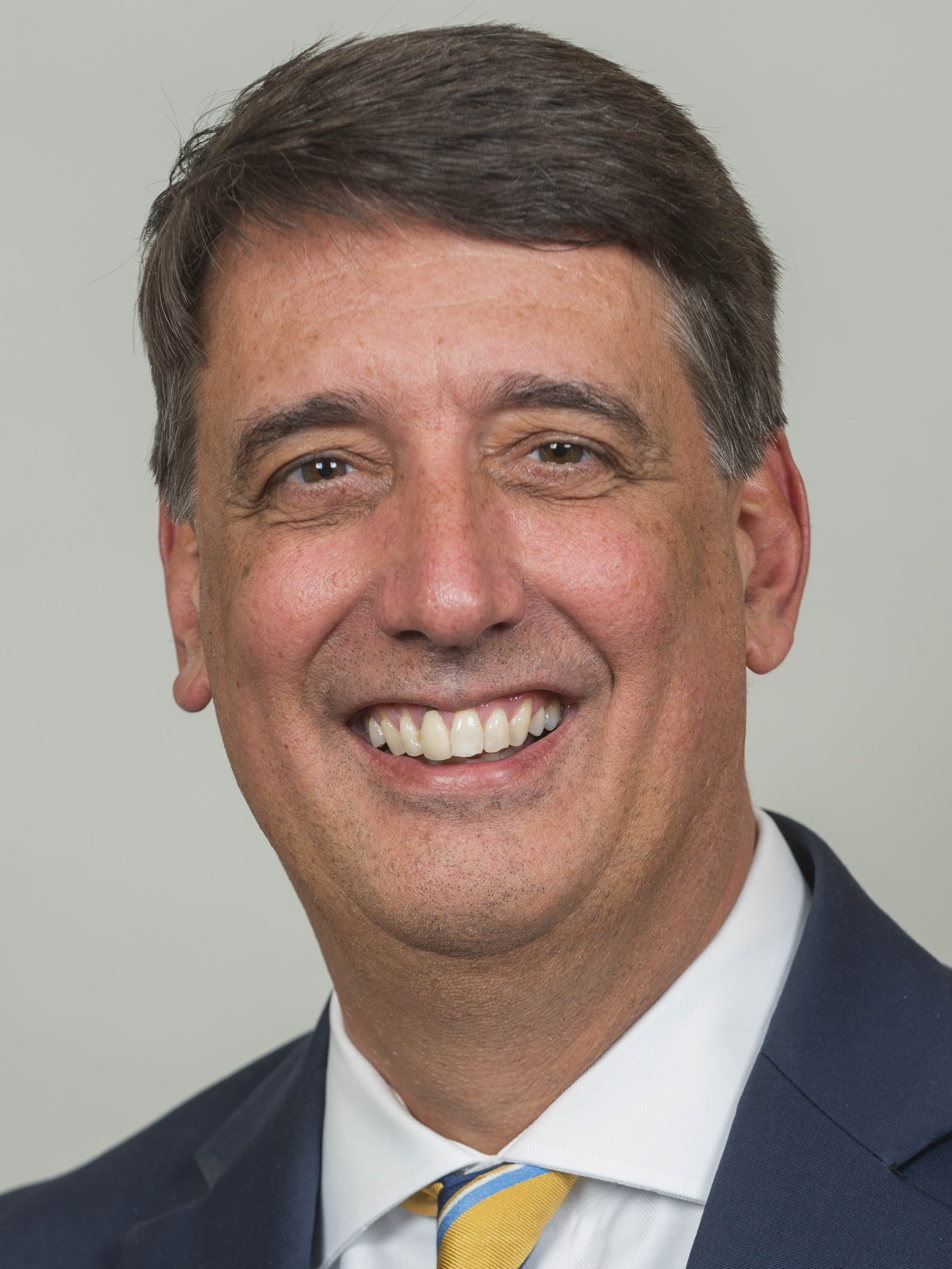
Candidate	Guy Guzzone
Party	Democratic
Popular vote	44,653
Percentage	97.6%
State Senator before election
Guy Guzzone
Democratic
Elected State Senator
Guy Guzzone
Democratic

The 13th district encompasses south Howard County. Three-term Democratic incumbent Guy Guzzone won re-election to the seat with 97.1 percent of the vote in 2022.

=== Democratic primary ===
==== Nominee ====
- Guy Guzzone, incumbent state senator

==== Endorsements ====
Guy Guzzone

Statewide officials

- Wes Moore, Maryland governor (2023–present)

Labor unions

- AFSCME Council 3
- LIUNA Philadelphia/Baltimore/Washington Laborers' District Council
- Maryland State Education Association
- Service Employees International Union Local 500

Organizations

- Maryland Farm Bureau
- Maryland League of Conservation Voters
- Maryland Sierra Club
- Moms Demand Action

==== Fundraising ====
Campaign finance reports as of June 7, 2026
Candidate	Raised	Spent	Cash on hand
Guy Guzzone (D)	$1,132,299	$439,234	$1,148,743
Source: Maryland State Board of Elections

==== Results ====
Democratic primary results
Party	Candidate	Votes	%
Democratic	Guy Guzzone (incumbent)	14,058	100.00%
Total votes		14,058	100.00%

=== General election ===
==== Fundraising ====
Campaign finance reports as of November 10, 2026
Candidate	Raised	Spent	Cash on hand
Guy Guzzone (D)	$1,196,880	$820,095	$832,464
Source: Maryland State Board of Elections

==== Results ====
2026 Maryland Senate 13th District election
Party	Candidate	Votes	%	±%
Democratic	Guy Guzzone (incumbent)	44,653	97.64%	+0.50%
Write-in		1,080	2.36%	-0.50%
Total votes		45,733	100.00%	

== District 14 ==
2026 Maryland Senate 14th District election
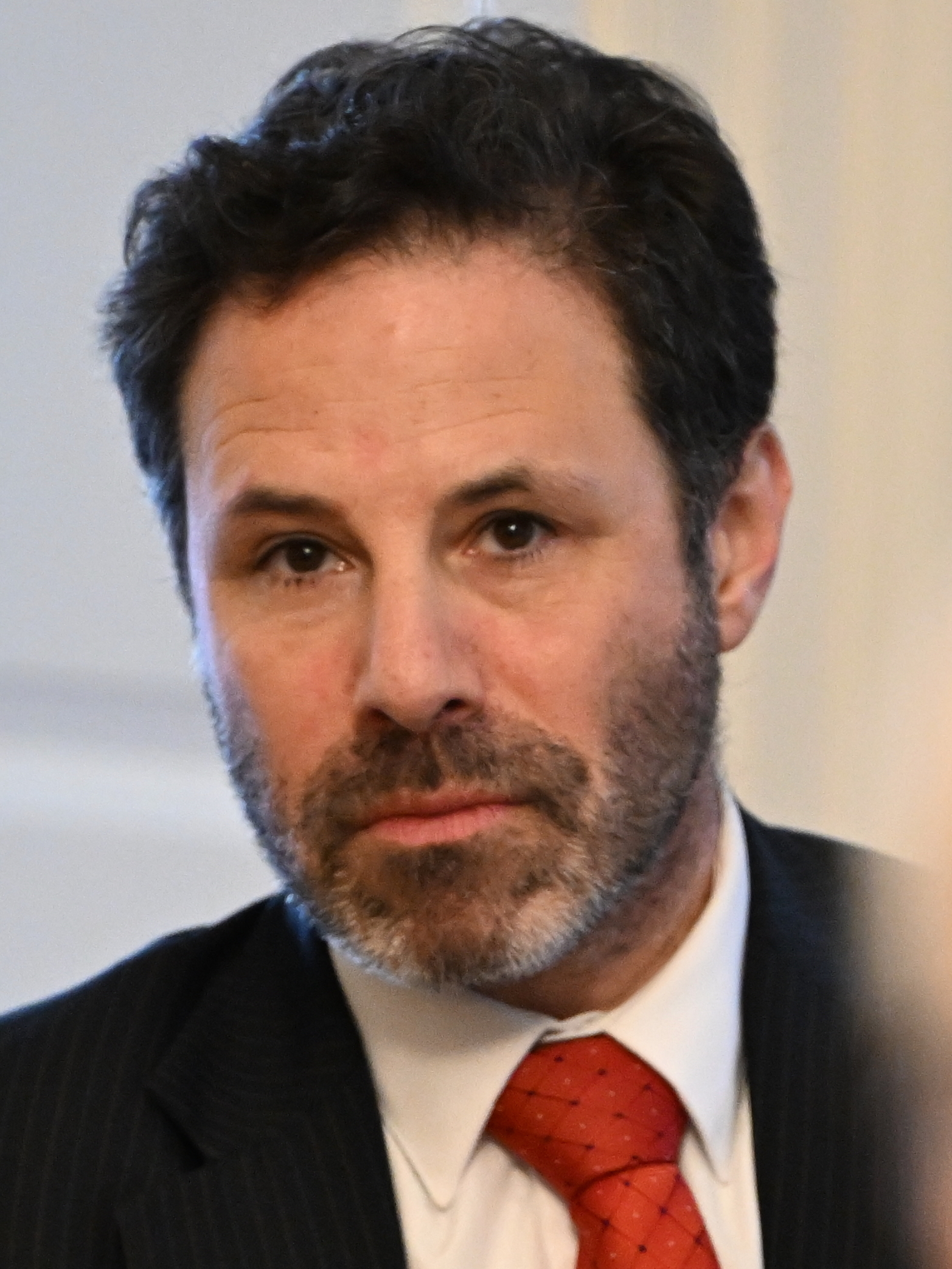
Candidate	Craig Zucker
Party	Democratic
Popular vote	41,956
Percentage	96.7%
State Senator before election
Craig Zucker
Democratic
Elected State Senator
Craig Zucker
Democratic

The 14th district runs along the border of Howard and Montgomery counties, including Olney. Two-term Democratic incumbent Craig Zucker won re-election to the seat with 73.3 percent of the vote in 2022.

=== Democratic primary ===
==== Nominee ====
- Craig Zucker, incumbent state senator

==== Endorsements ====
Craig Zucker

U.S. representatives

- Jamie Raskin, MD-08 (2017–present)

Statewide officials

- Wes Moore, Maryland governor (2023–present)

State legislators

- Anne Kaiser, state delegate from the 14th district (2003–present)
- Bernice Mireku-North, state delegate from the 14th district (2023–present)

County officials

- Ike Leggett, former Montgomery County executive (2006–2018)

Labor unions

- Amalgamated Transit Union Local 689
- AFSCME Council 3
- LIUNA Philadelphia/Baltimore/Washington Laborers' District Council
- Maryland State & DC AFL-CIO
- Maryland State Education Association
- Service Employees International Union Local 500
- United Food and Commercial Workers Local 1994 MCGEO

Organizations

- CASA in Action
- Maryland Farm Bureau
- Maryland League of Conservation Voters
- Maryland Sierra Club
- Moms Demand Action

==== Fundraising ====
Campaign finance reports as of June 7, 2026
Candidate	Raised	Spent	Cash on hand
Craig Zucker (D)	$636,193	$376,992	$345,115
Source: Maryland State Board of Elections

==== Results ====
Democratic primary results
Party	Candidate	Votes	%
Democratic	Craig Zucker (incumbent)	14,744	100.00%
Total votes		14,744	100.00%

=== General election ===
==== Fundraising ====
Campaign finance reports as of November 10, 2026
Candidate	Raised	Spent	Cash on hand
Craig Zucker (D)	$688,011	$623,195	$150,730
Source: Maryland State Board of Elections

==== Results ====
2026 Maryland Senate 14th District election
Party	Candidate	Votes	%	±%
Democratic	Craig Zucker (incumbent)	41,956	96.72%	+23.44%
Write-in		1,424	3.28%	+3.16%
Total votes		43,380	100.00%	

== District 15 ==
2026 Maryland Senate 15th District election
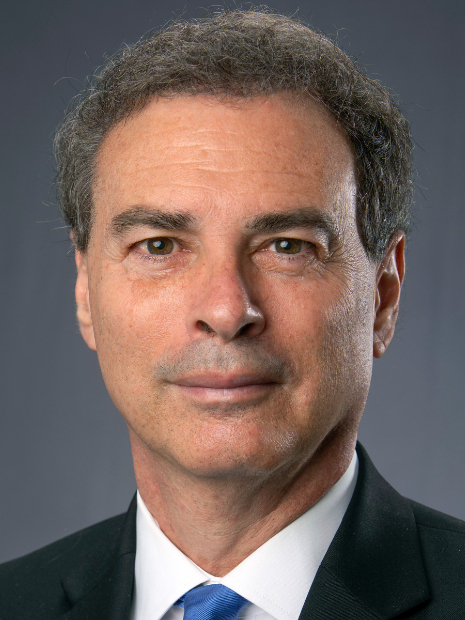
Candidate	Brian Feldman
Party	Democratic
Popular vote	41,453
Percentage	96.3%
State Senator before election
Brian Feldman
Democratic
Elected State Senator
Brian Feldman
Democratic

The 15th district encompasses east Montgomery County, including North Potomac and parts of Germantown. Two-term Democratic incumbent Brian Feldman won re-election to the seat with 73.0 percent of the vote in 2022.

=== Democratic primary ===
==== Nominee ====
- Brian Feldman, incumbent state senator

==== Endorsements ====
Brian Feldman

Statewide officials

- Wes Moore, Maryland governor (2023–present)

State legislators

- Linda Foley, state delegate from the 15th district (2021–present)
- David Fraser-Hidalgo, state delegate from the 15th district (2013–present)
- Lily Qi, state delegate from the 15th district (2019–present)

Labor unions

- Amalgamated Transit Union Local 689
- AFSCME Council 3
- LIUNA Philadelphia/Baltimore/Washington Laborers' District Council
- Maryland State & DC AFL-CIO
- Maryland State Education Association
- Service Employees International Union Local 500
- United Food and Commercial Workers Local 1994 MCGEO

Organizations

- CASA in Action
- Chesapeake Climate Action Network
- Humane World Action Fund
- Maryland Farm Bureau
- Maryland League of Conservation Voters
- Maryland National Organization for Women
- Maryland Sierra Club
- Moms Demand Action

==== Fundraising ====
Campaign finance reports as of June 7, 2026
Candidate	Raised	Spent	Cash on hand
Brian Feldman (D)	$553,203	$293,316	$660,509
Source: Maryland State Board of Elections

==== Results ====
Democratic primary results
Party	Candidate	Votes	%
Democratic	Brian Feldman (incumbent)	13,694	100.00%
Total votes		13,694	100.00%

=== General election ===
==== Fundraising ====
Campaign finance reports as of November 10, 2026
Candidate	Raised	Spent	Cash on hand
Brian Feldman (D)	$605,003	$659,811	$345,814
Source: Maryland State Board of Elections

==== Results ====
2026 Maryland Senate 15th District election
Party	Candidate	Votes	%	±%
Democratic	Brian Feldman (incumbent)	41,453	96.26%	+23.22%
Write-in		1,609	3.74%	+3.64%
Total votes		43,062	100.00%	

== District 16 ==
2026 Maryland Senate 16th District election
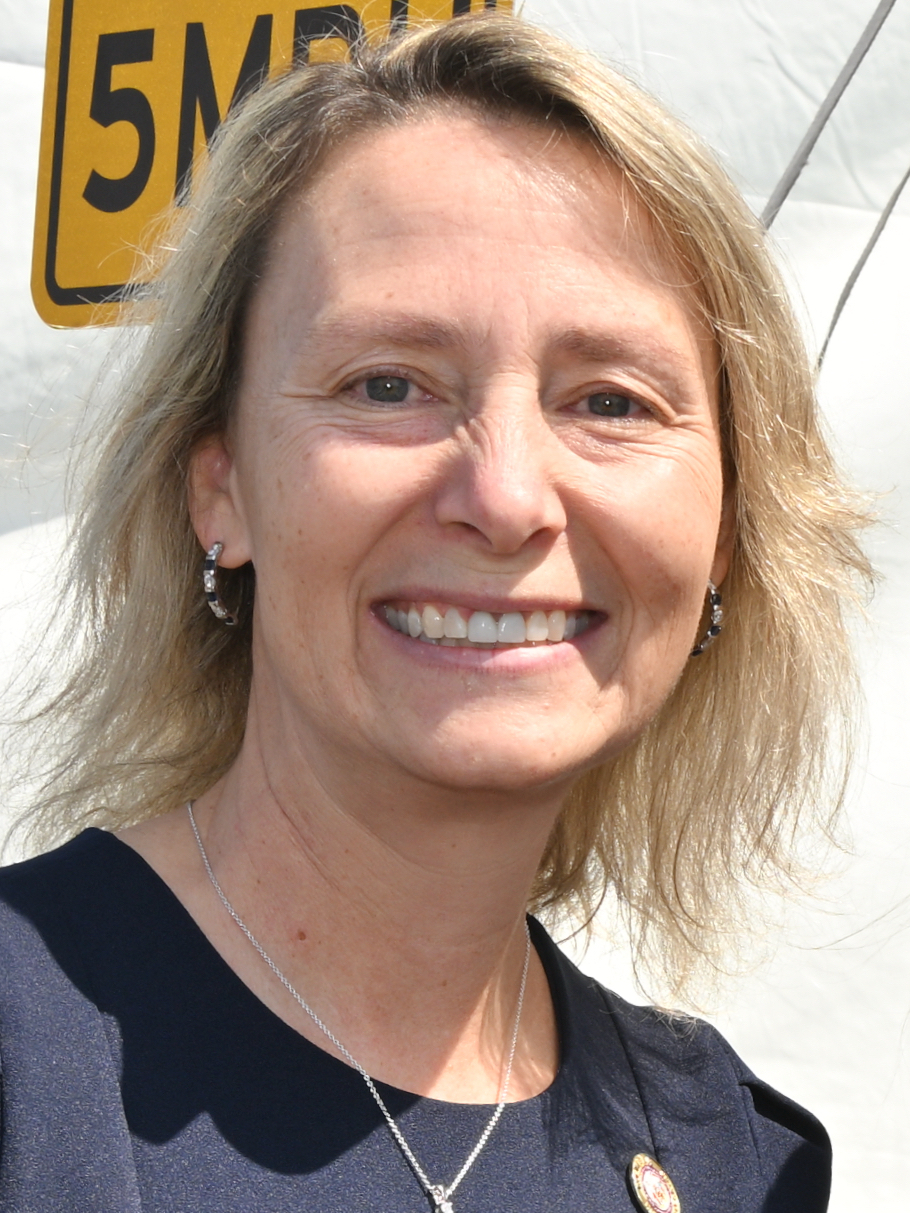
Candidate	Sara N. Love
Party	Democratic
Popular vote	47,924
Percentage	97.5%
State Senator before election
Sara N. Love
Democratic
Elected State Senator
Sara N. Love
Democratic

The 16th district consists of south Montgomery County, including Potomac and parts of Bethesda. Sara N. Love was appointed to the seat by Governor Wes Moore in June 2024 following the resignation of Ariana Kelly, who Moore appointed to the seat after he appointed its three-term incumbent, Susan C. Lee, to be the Maryland Secretary of State. Lee won re-election to the seat with 97.8 percent of the vote in 2022.

=== Democratic primary ===
==== Nominee ====
- Sara N. Love, incumbent state senator

==== Eliminated in primary ====
- Lou Bartolo, former president of the Maryland Nurses Association

==== Endorsements ====
Sara N. Love

Statewide officials

- Brian Frosh, former attorney general of Maryland (2015–2023)
- Nancy Kopp, former Maryland state treasurer (2002–2021)
- Wes Moore, Maryland governor (2023–present)

U.S. representatives

- Jamie Raskin, MD-08 (2017–present)

State legislators

- Karen Britto, state delegate from the 16th district (2010–2011)

Party officials

- Susan Turnbull, former chair of the Maryland Democratic Party (2009–2010)

Labor unions

- AFSCME Council 3
- IAFF Local 1664
- LIUNA Philadelphia/Baltimore/Washington Laborers' District Council
- Maryland State Education Association
- Service Employees International Union Local 500
- United Food and Commercial Workers Local 1994 MCGEO

Organizations

- Humane World Action Fund
- Maryland League of Conservation Voters
- Maryland National Organization for Women
- Maryland Sierra Club
- Moms Demand Action

==== Fundraising ====
Campaign finance reports as of June 7, 2026
Candidate	Raised	Spent	Cash on hand
Lou Bartolo (D)	$2,650	$6,693	$1,457
Sara Love (D)	$132,081	$58,966	$108,406÷
Source: Maryland State Board of Elections

==== Results ====
Democratic primary results
Party	Candidate	Votes	%
Democratic	Sara N. Love (incumbent)	18,380	90.65%
Democratic	Lou Bartolo	1,895	9.35%
Total votes		20,275	100.00%

=== General election ===
==== Fundraising ====
Campaign finance reports as of November 10, 2026
Candidate	Raised	Spent	Cash on hand
Sara Love (D)	$192,201	$157,631	$69,861
Source: Maryland State Board of Elections

==== Results ====
2026 Maryland Senate 16th District election
Party	Candidate	Votes	%	±%
Democratic	Sara N. Love (incumbent)	47,924	97.51%	−0.29%
Write-in		1,226	2.49%	+0.29%
Total votes		49,150	100.00%	

== District 17 ==
2026 Maryland Senate 17th District election
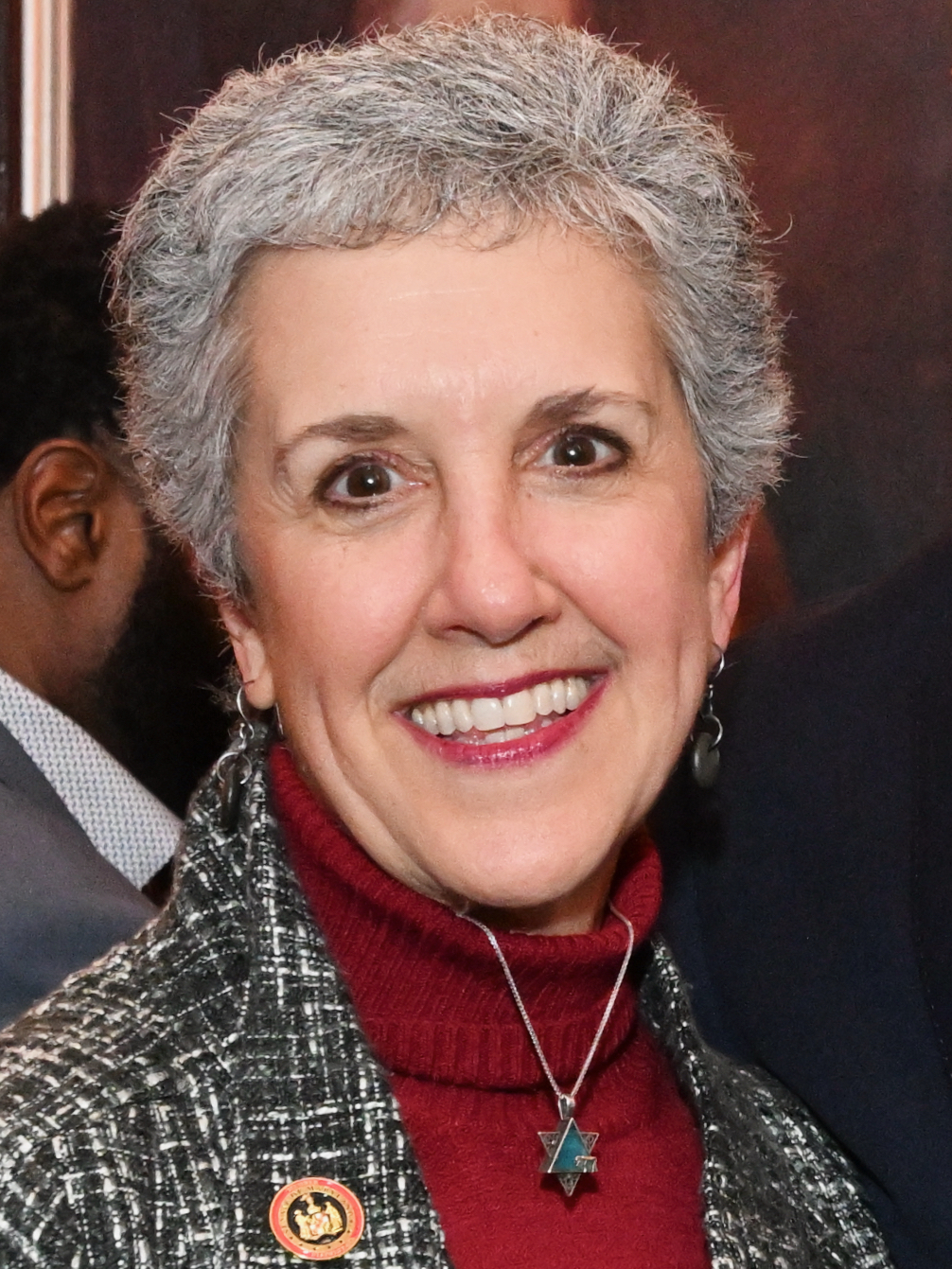

Candidate	Cheryl Kagan	Helene Meister
Party	Democratic	Republican
Popular vote	36,280	6,740
Percentage	84.1%	15.6%
- Precinct results Kagan: 80–90% >90%
State Senator before election
Cheryl Kagan
Democratic
Elected State Senator
Cheryl Kagan
Democratic

The 17th district consists of Rockville and Gaithersburg. Three-term Democratic incumbent Cheryl Kagan won re-election to the seat with 97.2 percent of the vote in 2022.

=== Democratic primary ===
==== Nominee ====
- Cheryl Kagan, incumbent state senator

==== Eliminated in primary ====
- Philip Cook, biomanufacturing associate

==== Endorsements ====
Philip Cook

Labor unions

- United Food and Commercial Workers Local 1994 MCGEO

Organizations

- Council on American–Islamic Relations Action
Cheryl Kagan

Statewide officials

- Wes Moore, Maryland governor (2023–present)

Labor unions

- Amalgamated Transit Union Local 689
- AFSCME Council 3
- LIUNA Philadelphia/Baltimore/Washington Laborers' District Council
- Maryland State & DC AFL-CIO
- Maryland State Education Association
- Service Employees International Union Local 500

Organizations

- Maryland League of Conservation Voters
- Maryland National Organization for Women
- Maryland Sierra Club

==== Fundraising ====
Campaign finance reports as of June 7, 2026
Candidate	Raised	Spent	Cash on hand
Philip Cook (D)	$3,603	$2,915	$688
Cheryl Kagan (D)	$144,540	$98,325	$147,399
Source: Maryland State Board of Elections

==== Results ====
Democratic primary results
Party	Candidate	Votes	%
Democratic	Cheryl Kagan (incumbent)	11,432	79.74%
Democratic	Philip Cook	2,904	20.26%
Total votes		14,336	100.00%

=== Republican primary ===
==== Nominee ====
- Helene Meister, tax specialist and nominee for HD-17 in 2022

==== Results ====
Republican primary results
Party	Candidate	Votes	%
Republican	Helene Meister	1,118	100.00%
Total votes		1,118	100.00%

=== General election ===
==== Fundraising ====
Campaign finance reports as of November 10, 2026
Candidate	Raised	Spent	Cash on hand
Cheryl Kagan (D)	$219,557	$243,860	$76,882
Helene Meister (R)	$3,766	$3,669	$97
Source: Maryland State Board of Elections

==== Results ====
2026 Maryland Senate 17th District election
Party	Candidate	Votes	%	±%
Democratic	Cheryl Kagan (incumbent)	36,280	84.06%	−13.13%
Republican	Helene Meister	6,747	15.63%	
Write-in		135	0.31%	-2.50%
Total votes		43,162	100.00%	

== District 18 ==
2026 Maryland Senate 18th District election
Candidate	Jeff Waldstreicher
Party	Democratic
Popular vote	40,783
Percentage	97.7%
State Senator before election
Jeff Waldstreicher
Democratic
Elected State Senator
Jeff Waldstreicher
Democratic

The 18th district consists of Bethesda, Chevy Chase, Wheaton, and Kensington. Two-term Democratic incumbent Jeff Waldstreicher won re-election to the seat with 82.8 percent of the vote in 2022.

=== Democratic primary ===
==== Nominee ====
- Jeff Waldstreicher, incumbent state senator

==== Endorsements ====
Jeff Waldstreicher

U.S. executive branch officials

- Erek Barron, former U.S. attorney for the District of Maryland (2021–2025)

U.S. senators

- Angela Alsobrooks, U.S. senator from Maryland (2025–present)
- Chris Van Hollen, U.S. senator from Maryland (2017–present)

U.S. representatives

- Sarah Elfreth, MD-03 (2025–present)
- Glenn Ivey, MD-04 (2023–present)
- April McClain Delaney, MD-06 (2025–present)
- Jamie Raskin, MD-08 (2017–present)
- Johnny Olszewski, MD-02 (2025–present)

Statewide officials

- Anthony Brown, Maryland attorney general (2023–present)
- Brian Frosh, former Maryland attorney general (2015–2023)
- Wes Moore, Maryland governor (2023–present)

State legislators

- 4 state senators, including Senate president Bill Ferguson
- Ana Sol Gutierrez, former state delegate from the 18th district (2003–2019)

County officials

- Tom Hucker, former county councilmember from the 5th district (2014–2022)
- Ike Leggett, former Montgomery County executive (2006–2018)

Individuals

- Benjamin Crump, civil rights attorney
- Vincent DeMarco, president of the Maryland Citizens' Health Initiative
- Susie Gelman, chairwoman of the Israel Policy Forum
- DeRay Mckesson, civil rights activist and candidate for mayor of Baltimore in 2016

Party officials

- Susan Turnbull, former chair of the Maryland Democratic Party (2009–2011) and nominee for lieutenant governor of Maryland in 2018

Labor unions

- Amalgamated Transit Union Local 689
- AFSCME Council 3
- LIUNA Philadelphia/Baltimore/Washington Laborers' District Council
- Maryland State & DC AFL-CIO
- Maryland State Education Association
- Service Employees International Union Local 500
- United Food and Commercial Workers Local 1994 MCGEO

Organizations

- Brady PAC
- CASA in Action
- Maryland League of Conservation Voters
- Maryland Sierra Club
- Moms Demand Action

==== Fundraising ====
Campaign finance reports as of June 7, 2026
Candidate	Raised	Spent	Cash on hand
Jeff Waldstreicher (D)	$802,138	$120,332	$753,114
Source: Maryland State Board of Elections

==== Results ====
Democratic primary results
Party	Candidate	Votes	%
Democratic	Jeff Waldstreicher (incumbent)	15,404	100.00%
Total votes		15,404	100.00%

=== General election ===
==== Fundraising ====
Campaign finance reports as of November 10, 2026
Candidate	Raised	Spent	Cash on hand
Jeff Waldstreicher (D)	$846,397	$323,868	$593,837
Source: Maryland State Board of Elections

==== Results ====
2026 Maryland Senate 18th District election
Party	Candidate	Votes	%	±%
Democratic	Jeff Waldstreicher (incumbent)	40,783	97.68%	+14.88%
Write-in		968	2.32%	+1.93%
Total votes		41,751	100.00%	

== District 19 ==
2026 Maryland Senate 19th District election
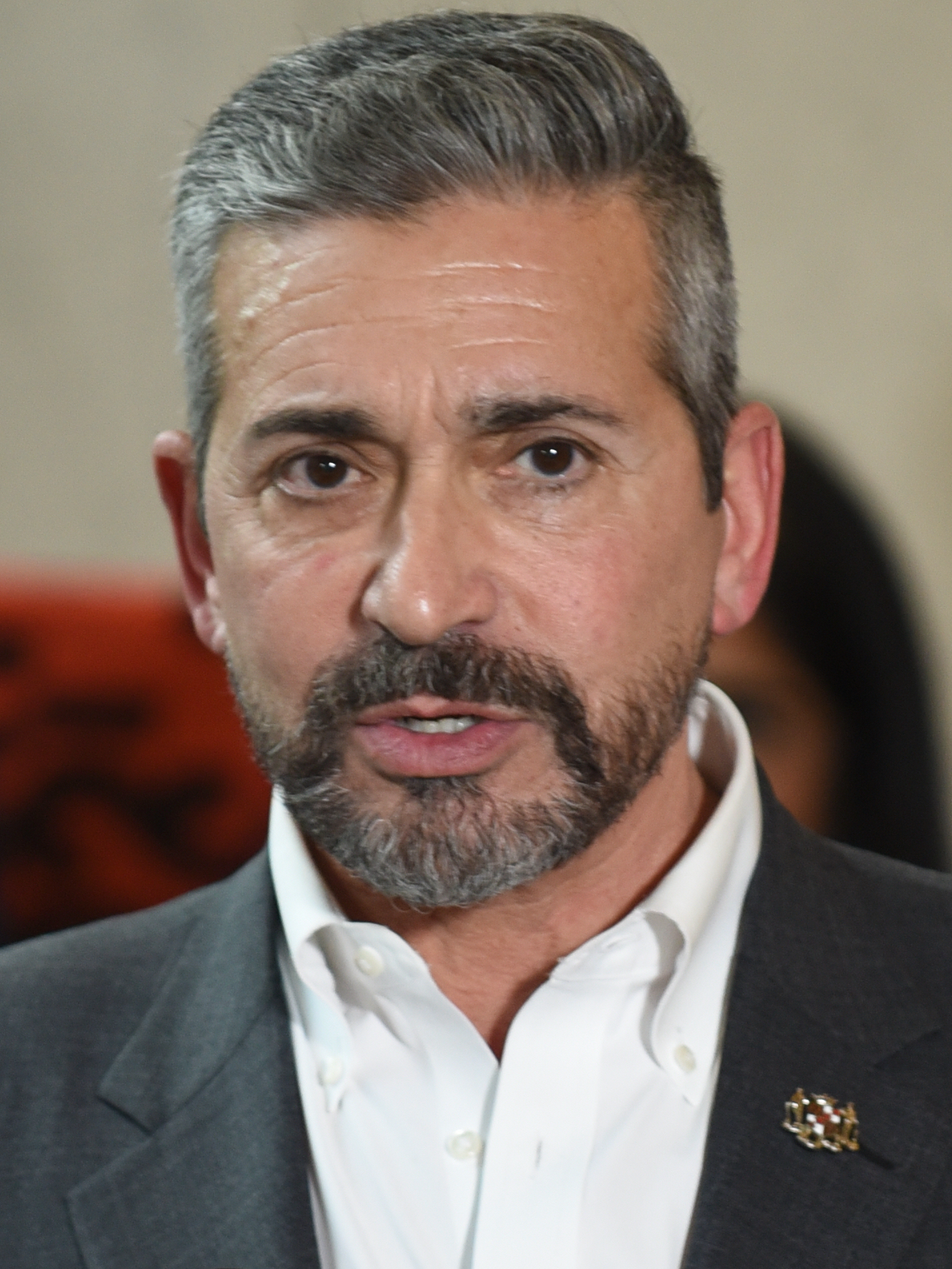
Candidate	Benjamin F. Kramer
Party	Democratic
Popular vote	37,702
Percentage	97.2%
State Senator before election
Benjamin F. Kramer
Democratic
Elected State Senator
Benjamin F. Kramer
Democratic

The 19th district includes Aspen Hill, Leisure World, and Redland. Two-term Democratic incumbent Benjamin F. Kramer won re-election to the seat with 75.5 percent of the vote in 2022.

=== Democratic primary ===
==== Nominee ====
- Benjamin F. Kramer, incumbent state senator

==== Endorsements ====
Benjamin F. Kramer

Statewide officials

- Wes Moore, Maryland governor (2023–present)

State legislators

- Charlotte Crutchfield, state delegate from the 19th district (2019–present)
- Vaughn Stewart, state delegate from the 19th district (2019–present)

Labor unions

- Amalgamated Transit Union Local 689
- AFSCME Council 3
- LIUNA Philadelphia/Baltimore/Washington Laborers' District Council
- Maryland State & DC AFL-CIO
- Maryland State Education Association
- Service Employees International Union Local 500
- United Food and Commercial Workers Local 1994 MCGEO

Organizations

- CASA in Action
- Humane World Action Fund
- Maryland Farm Bureau
- Maryland League of Conservation Voters
- Maryland Sierra Club

==== Fundraising ====
Campaign finance reports as of June 7, 2026
Candidate	Raised	Spent	Cash on hand
Benjamin F. Kramer (D)	$92,411	$64,483	$169,238
Source: Maryland State Board of Elections

==== Results ====
Democratic primary results
Party	Candidate	Votes	%
Democratic	Benjamin F. Kramer (incumbent)	13,888	100.00%
Total votes		13,888	100.00%

=== General election ===
==== Fundraising ====
Campaign finance reports as of November 10, 2026
Candidate	Raised	Spent	Cash on hand
Benjamin F. Kramer (D)	$118,689	$89,683	$170,316
Source: Maryland State Board of Elections

==== Results ====
2026 Maryland Senate 19th District election
Party	Candidate	Votes	%	±%
Democratic	Benjamin F. Kramer (incumbent)	37,702	97.18%	+21.67%
Write-in		1,095	2.82%	+2.73%
Total votes		38,797	100.00%	

== District 20 ==
2026 Maryland Senate 20th District election
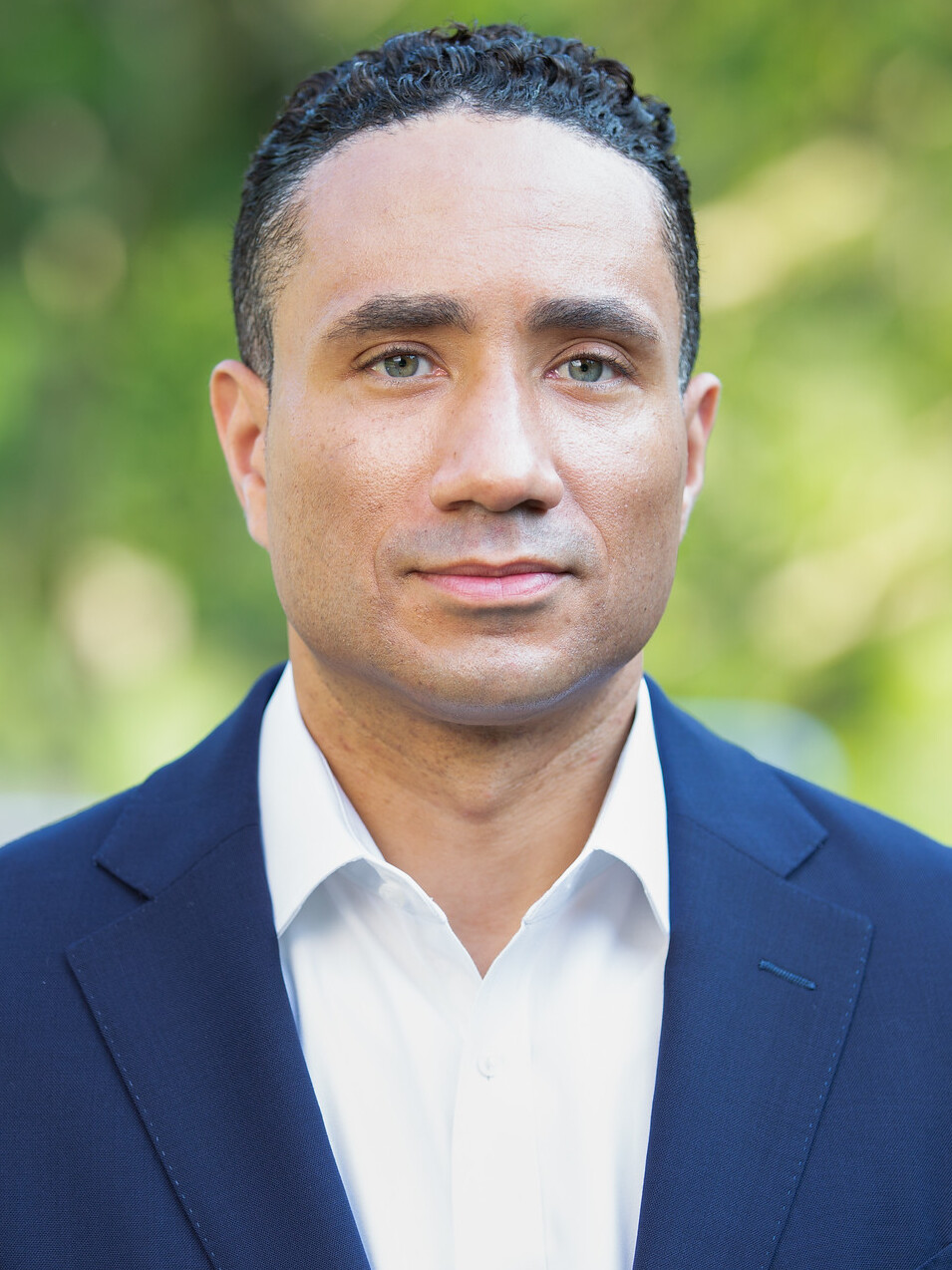
Candidate	William C. Smith Jr.
Party	Democratic
Popular vote	39,929
Percentage	98.8%
State Senator before election
William C. Smith Jr.
Democratic
Elected State Senator
William C. Smith Jr.
Democratic

The 20th district includes Silver Spring, White Oak, and Takoma Park. Two-term Democratic incumbent William C. Smith Jr. won re-election to the seat with 98.8 percent of the vote in 2022.

=== Democratic primary ===
==== Nominee ====
- William C. Smith Jr., incumbent state senator

==== Endorsements ====
William C. Smith Jr.

Statewide officials

- Wes Moore, Maryland governor (2023–present)

Labor unions

- AFSCME Council 3
- LIUNA Philadelphia/Baltimore/Washington Laborers' District Council
- Maryland State Education Association
- Service Employees International Union Local 500
- United Food and Commercial Workers Local 1994 MCGEO

Organizations

- CASA in Action
- Maryland Farm Bureau
- Maryland League of Conservation Voters
- Maryland Sierra Club
- Moms Demand Action
- VoteVets.org

Newspapers

- Baltimore Afro-American

==== Fundraising ====
Campaign finance reports as of June 7, 2026
Candidate	Raised	Spent	Cash on hand
Will Smith (D)	$488,745	$216,336	$310,227
Source: Maryland State Board of Elections

==== Results ====
Democratic primary results
Party	Candidate	Votes	%
Democratic	William C. Smith Jr. (incumbent)	16,054	100.00%
Total votes		16,054	100.00%

=== General election ===
==== Fundraising ====
Campaign finance reports as of November 10, 2026
Candidate	Raised	Spent	Cash on hand
Will Smith (D)	$544,717	$426,605	$155,930
Source: Maryland State Board of Elections

==== Results ====
2026 Maryland Senate 20th District election
Party	Candidate	Votes	%	±%
Democratic	William C. Smith Jr. (incumbent)	39,929	98.79%	+0.01%
Write-in		491	1.21%	-0.01%
Total votes		40,420	100.00%	

== District 21 ==
2026 Maryland Senate 21st District election
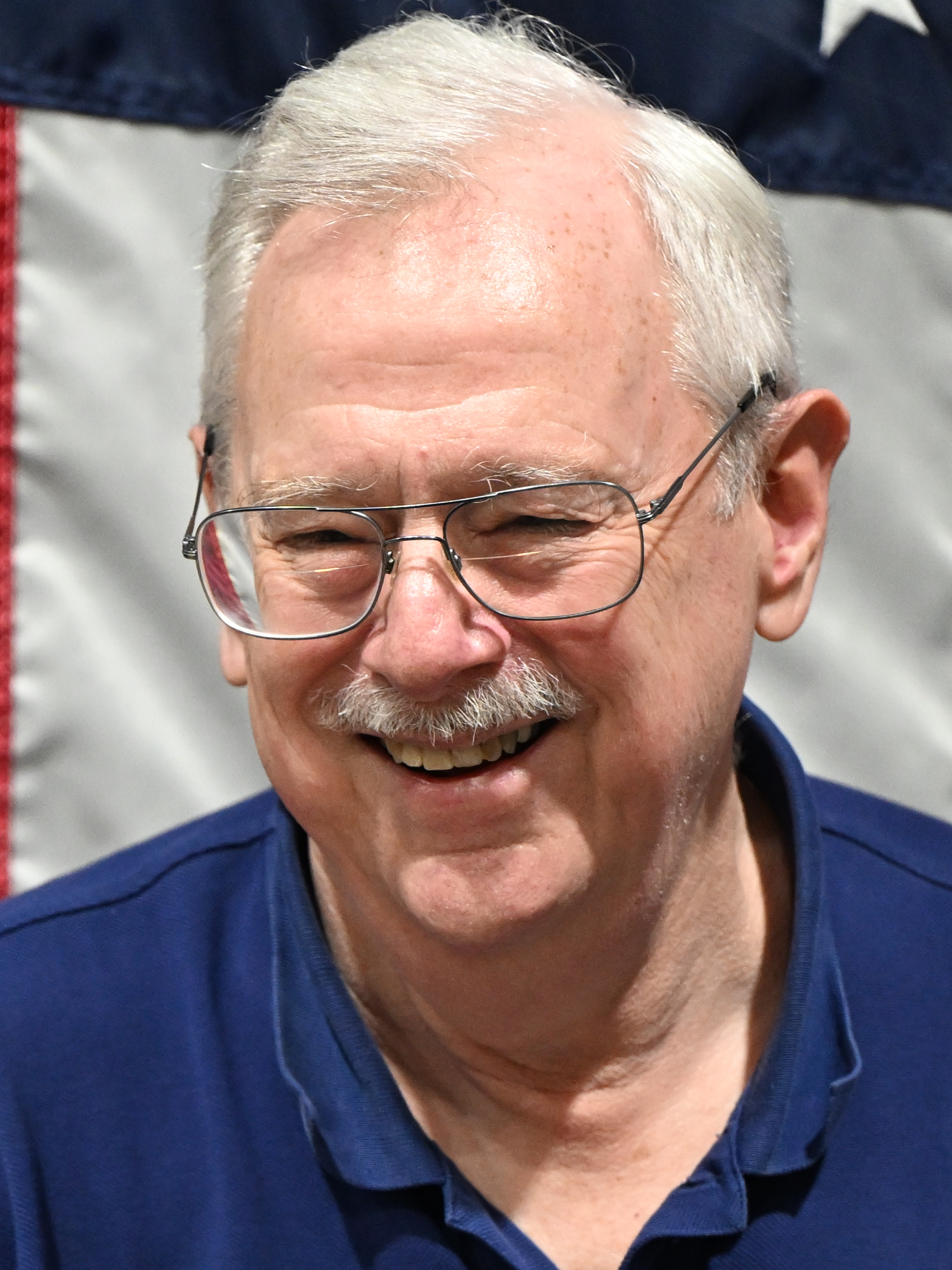

Candidate	James Rosapepe	Lee Havis
Party	Democratic	Republican
State Senator before election
James Rosapepe
Democratic
Elected State Senator
James Rosapepe
Democratic

The 21st district includes parts of Prince George's and Anne Arundel counties, including College Park, Laurel, and Beltsville. Five-term Democratic incumbent James Rosapepe won re-election to the seat with 79.0 percent of the vote in 2022, and is running for re-election.

=== Democratic primary ===
==== Nominee ====
- James Rosapepe, incumbent state senator

==== Endorsements ====
James Rosapepe

Statewide officials

- Wes Moore, Maryland governor (2023–present)

State legislators

- Ben Barnes, HD-21 (2007–present)
- Mary A. Lehman, HD-21 (2019–present)
- Joseline Peña-Melnyk, HD-21 (2007–present)

Labor unions

- Amalgamated Transit Union Local 689
- AFSCME Council 3
- LIUNA Philadelphia/Baltimore/Washington Laborers' District Council
- Maryland State & DC AFL-CIO
- Maryland State Education Association
- Service Employees International Union Local 500
- United Food and Commercial Workers Local 1994 MCGEO

Organizations

- Maryland League of Conservation Voters
- Maryland Sierra Club

==== Fundraising ====
Campaign finance reports as of June 7, 2026
Candidate	Raised	Spent	Cash on hand
James Rosapepe (D)	$221,678	$259,403	$115,134
Source: Maryland State Board of Elections

==== Results ====
Democratic primary results
Party	Candidate	Votes	%
Democratic	James Rosapepe (incumbent)	10,367	100.00%
Total votes		10,367	100.00%

=== Republican primary ===
==== Nominee ====
- Lee Havis, perennial candidate

==== Endorsements ====
Lee Havis

Organizations

- Maryland Right to Life

==== Fundraising ====
Campaign finance reports as of June 7, 2026
Candidate	Raised	Spent	Cash on hand
Lee Havis (R)	$802	$7	$293
Source: Maryland State Board of Elections

==== Results ====
Republican primary results
Party	Candidate	Votes	%
Republican	Lee Havis	1,011	100.00%
Total votes		1,011	100.00%

=== General election ===
==== Fundraising ====
Campaign finance reports as of November 10, 2026
Candidate	Raised	Spent	Cash on hand
James Rosapepe (D)	$230,928	$271,422	$45,763
Lee Havis (R)	$15,591	$4,633	$222
Source: Maryland State Board of Elections

==== Results ====
2026 Maryland Senate 21st District election
Party	Candidate	Votes	%	±%
Democratic	James Rosapepe (incumbent)			
Republican	Lee Havis			
Write-in				
Total votes				

== District 22 ==
2026 Maryland Senate 22nd District election
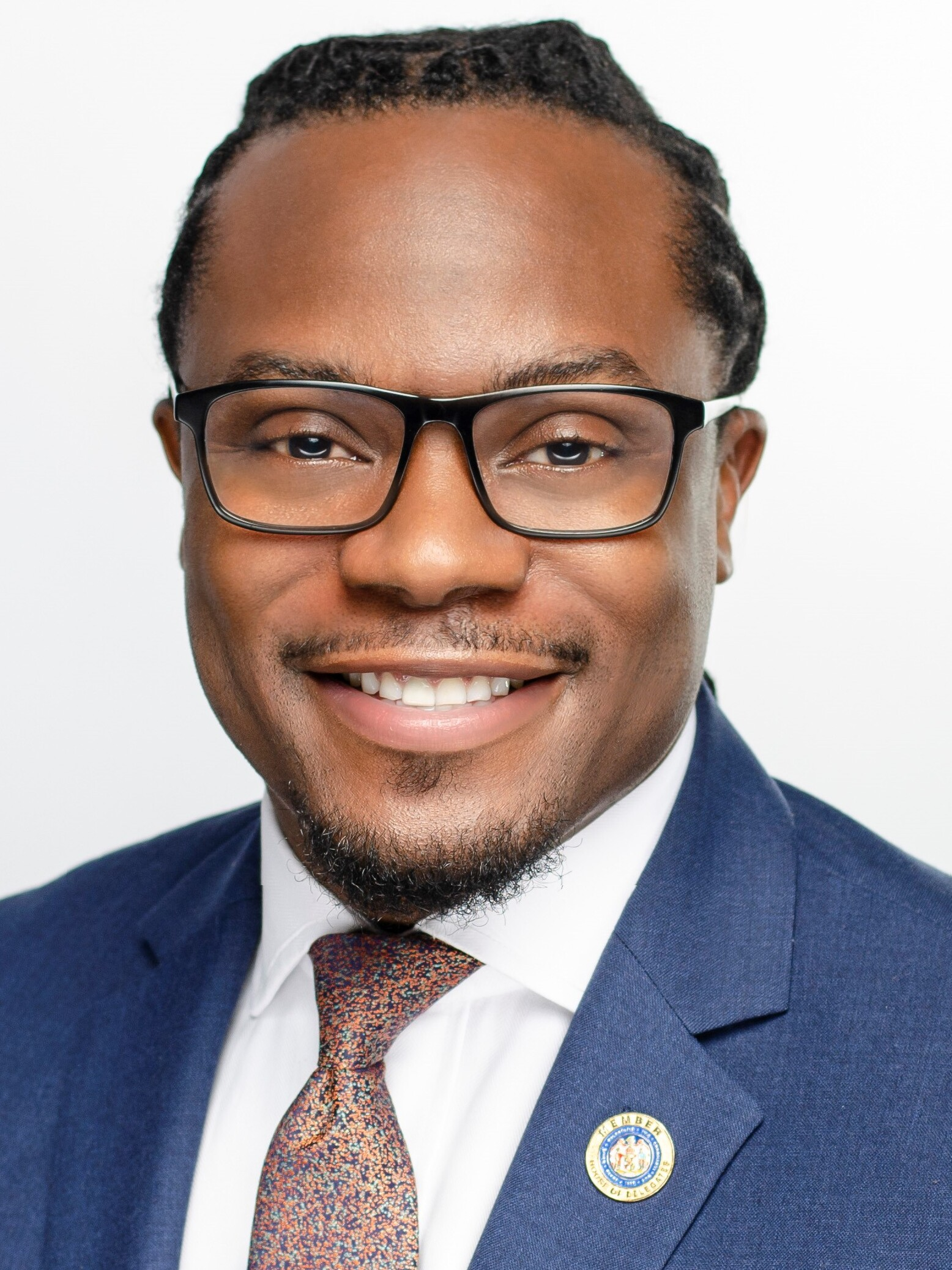

Candidate	Alonzo T. Washington	Jim Wass
Party	Democratic	Republican
State Senator before election
Alonzo T. Washington
Democratic
Elected State Senator
Alonzo T. Washington
Democratic

The 22nd district consists of Hyattsville, Greenbelt, and Riverdale Park. Alonzo T. Washington was appointed to the seat in January 2023 after Governor Wes Moore appointed eight-term incumbent Paul G. Pinsky to be the director of the Maryland Energy Administration. Pinsky won re-election to the seat with 98.6 percent of the vote in 2022.

=== Democratic primary ===
==== Nominee ====
- Alonzo T. Washington, incumbent state senator

==== Endorsements ====
Endorsements in bold were made after the primary elections.

Alonzo T. Washington

Statewide officials

- Wes Moore, Maryland governor (2023–present)

Labor unions

- Amalgamated Transit Union Local 689
- AFSCME Council 3
- LIUNA Philadelphia/Baltimore/Washington Laborers' District Council
- Maryland State & DC AFL-CIO
- **Maryland State Education Association**
- Service Employees International Union Local 500
- United Food and Commercial Workers Local 1994 MCGEO

Organizations

- CASA in Action
- Maryland League of Conservation Voters
- Maryland Sierra Club
- Moms Demand Action

Newspapers

- Baltimore Afro-American

==== Fundraising ====
Campaign finance reports as of June 7, 2026
Candidate	Raised	Spent	Cash on hand
Alonzo Washington (D)	$215,367	$183,456	$50,069
Source: Maryland State Board of Elections

==== Results ====
Democratic primary results
Party	Candidate	Votes	%
**Democratic**	**Alonzo T. Washington (incumbent)**	**10,294**	**100.00%**
Total votes		**10,294**	**100.00%**

=== Republican primary ===
==== Nominee ====
- Jim Wass, business process analyst

==== Fundraising ====
Campaign finance reports as of June 7, 2026
Candidate	Raised	Spent	Cash on hand
Jim Wass (R)	<$1,000	<$1,000	N/A
Source: Maryland State Board of Elections

==== Results ====
Republican primary results
Party	Candidate	Votes	%
**Republican**	**Jim Wass**	**323**	**100.00%**
Total votes		**323**	**100.00%**

=== General election ===
==== Fundraising ====
Campaign finance reports as of November 10, 2026
Candidate	Raised	Spent	Cash on hand
Alonzo Washington (D)	$232,017	$210,632	$39,542
Source: Maryland State Board of Elections

==== Results ====
2026 Maryland Senate 22nd District election
Party	Candidate	Votes	%	±%
Democratic	Alonzo T. Washington (incumbent)			
Republican	Jim Wass			
Write-in				
Total votes				

== District 23 ==
2026 Maryland Senate 23rd District election
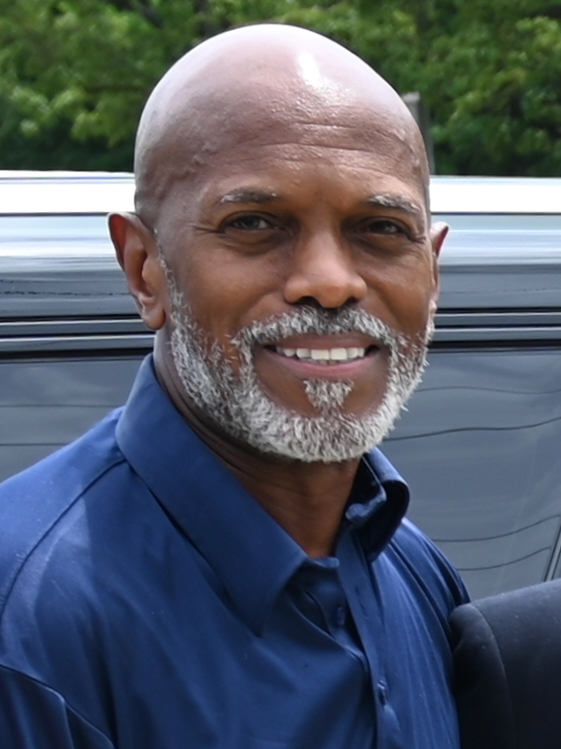

Candidate	Ron Watson	James Amah
Party	Democratic	Republican
State Senator before election
Ron Watson
Democratic
Elected State Senator
Ron Watson
Democratic

The 23rd district runs along the border of Prince George's and Anne Arundel counties, including Upper Marlboro, Bowie, and South Laurel. One-term Democratic incumbent Ron Watson won election to the seat with 87.4 percent of the vote in 2022.

=== Democratic primary ===
==== Nominee ====
- Ron Watson, incumbent state senator

==== Eliminated in primary ====
- Raaheela Ahmed, organizer and candidate for this district in 2022

==== Endorsements ====
Raaheela Ahmed

Labor unions

- Amalgamated Transit Union Local 689
- AFSCME Council 3
- LIUNA Philadelphia/Baltimore/Washington Laborers' District Council
- Maryland State & DC AFL-CIO
- Maryland State Education Association
- United Food and Commercial Workers Local 1994 MCGEO

Organizations

- CASA in Action
- Chesapeake Climate Action Network
- Council on American–Islamic Relations Action
- Maryland National Organization for Women
- Maryland Sierra Club
- Metro DC Democratic Socialists of America
- Moms Demand Action
- New American Leaders Action Fund
- Our Revolution
- People for the American Way
- Third Act Maryland
- Working Families Party
Ron Watson

Statewide officials

- Wes Moore, Maryland governor (2023–present)

State legislators

- Adrian Boafo, state delegate from the 23rd district (2023–present)
- Marvin E. Holmes Jr., state delegate from the 23rd district (2003–present)
- Kym Taylor, state delegate from the 23rd district (2023–present)

Organizations

- Maryland Farm Bureau
- Maryland League of Conservation Voters
- Moms Demand Action

Newspapers

- Baltimore Afro-American

==== Fundraising ====
Campaign finance reports as of June 7, 2026
Candidate	Raised	Spent	Cash on hand
Raaheela Ahmed (D)	$94,439	$64,708	$62,869
Ron Watson (D)	$370,314	$309,471	$27,579
Source: Maryland State Board of Elections

==== Results ====
Results by precinct Watson: 50–60%; 60–70%; Ahmed: 50–60%; 60–70%; >90%

Democratic primary results
Party	Candidate	Votes	%
Democratic	Ron Watson (incumbent)	13,625	55.45%
Democratic	Raaheela Ahmed	10,947	44.55%
Total votes		24,572	100.00%

=== Republican primary ===
==== Nominee ====
- James A. T. Amah, attorney

==== Fundraising ====
Campaign finance reports as of June 7, 2026
Candidate	Raised	Spent	Cash on hand
James A. T. Amah (R)	<$1,000	<$1,000	N/A
Source: Maryland State Board of Elections

==== Results ====
Republican primary results
Party	Candidate	Votes	%
Republican	James A. T. Amah	725	100.00%
Total votes		725	100.00%

=== General election ===
==== Fundraising ====
Campaign finance reports as of November 10, 2026
Candidate	Raised	Spent	Cash on hand
Ron Watson (D)	$389,593	$341,631	$14,699
Source: Maryland State Board of Elections

==== Results ====
2026 Maryland Senate 23rd District election
Party	Candidate	Votes	%	±%
Democratic	Ron Watson (incumbent)			
Republican	James A. T. Amah			
Write-in				
Total votes				

== District 24 ==
2026 Maryland Senate 24th District election
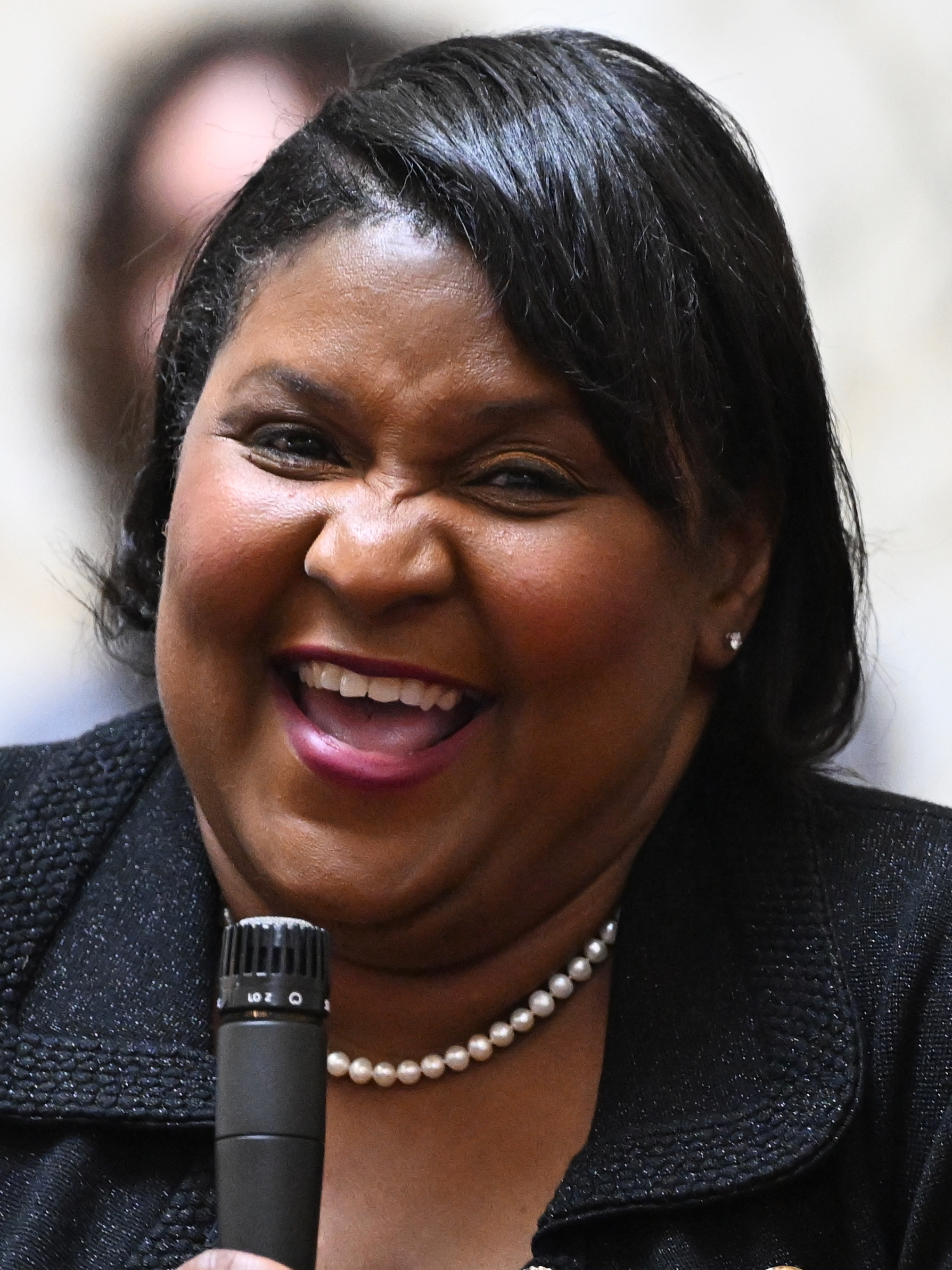
Candidate	Tiffany T. Alston
Party	Democratic
State Senator before election
Joanne C. Benson
Democratic
Elected State Senator
Tiffany T. Alston
Democratic

The 24th district consists of Seat Pleasant, Springdale, and Lake Arbor. Four-term Democratic incumbent Joanne C. Benson won election to the seat with 99.2 percent of the vote in 2022.

=== Democratic primary ===
==== Nominee ====
- Tiffany T. Alston, state delegate from the 24th district (2011–2012, 2023–present)

==== Eliminated in primary ====
- Kevin Ford Jr., real estate broker

==== Declined ====
- Joanne C. Benson, incumbent state senator (endorsed Ford)

==== Endorsements ====
Tiffany Alston

Statewide officials

- Brooke Lierman, Maryland Comptroller (2023–present)

Local officials

- Aisha Braveboy, Prince George's County executive (2025–present)

Labor unions

- Amalgamated Transit Union Local 689
- AFSCME Council 3
- LIUNA Philadelphia/Baltimore/Washington Laborers' District Council
- Maryland State & DC AFL-CIO
- United Food and Commercial Workers Local 1994 MCGEO

Organizations

- Council on American–Islamic Relations Action

Newspapers

- Baltimore Afro-American
Kevin Ford Jr.

U.S. senators

- Angela Alsobrooks, U.S. senator from Maryland (2025–present)

State legislators

- Joanne C. Benson, state senator from the 24th district (2011–present)

Organizations

- Maryland Forward Party
- Run for Something
- Working Families Party

==== Fundraising ====
Campaign finance reports as of May 12, 2026
Candidate	Raised	Spent	Cash on hand
Tiffany Alston (D) (Note: As of last reported on January 14, 2026)	$46,901	$26,602	$24,344
Kevin Ford (D)	$250,361	$189,836	$45,878
Source: Maryland State Board of Elections

==== Results ====
Results by precinct Alston: 50–60%; 60–70%; 70–80%; >90%; Ford: 50–60%; 60–70%; >90%

Democratic primary results
Party	Candidate	Votes	%
Democratic	Tiffany T. Alston	11,236	59.01%
Democratic	Kevin Ford, Jr.	7,805	40.99%
Total votes		19,041	100.00%

=== General election ===
==== Fundraising ====
Campaign finance reports as of November 10, 2026
Candidate	Raised	Spent	Cash on hand
Tiffany Alston (D)	$82,480	$94,713	($1,737)
Source: Maryland State Board of Elections

==== Results ====
2026 Maryland Senate 24th District election
Party	Candidate	Votes	%	±%
Democratic	Tiffany T. Alston			
Write-in				
Total votes				

== District 25 ==
2026 Maryland Senate 25th District election
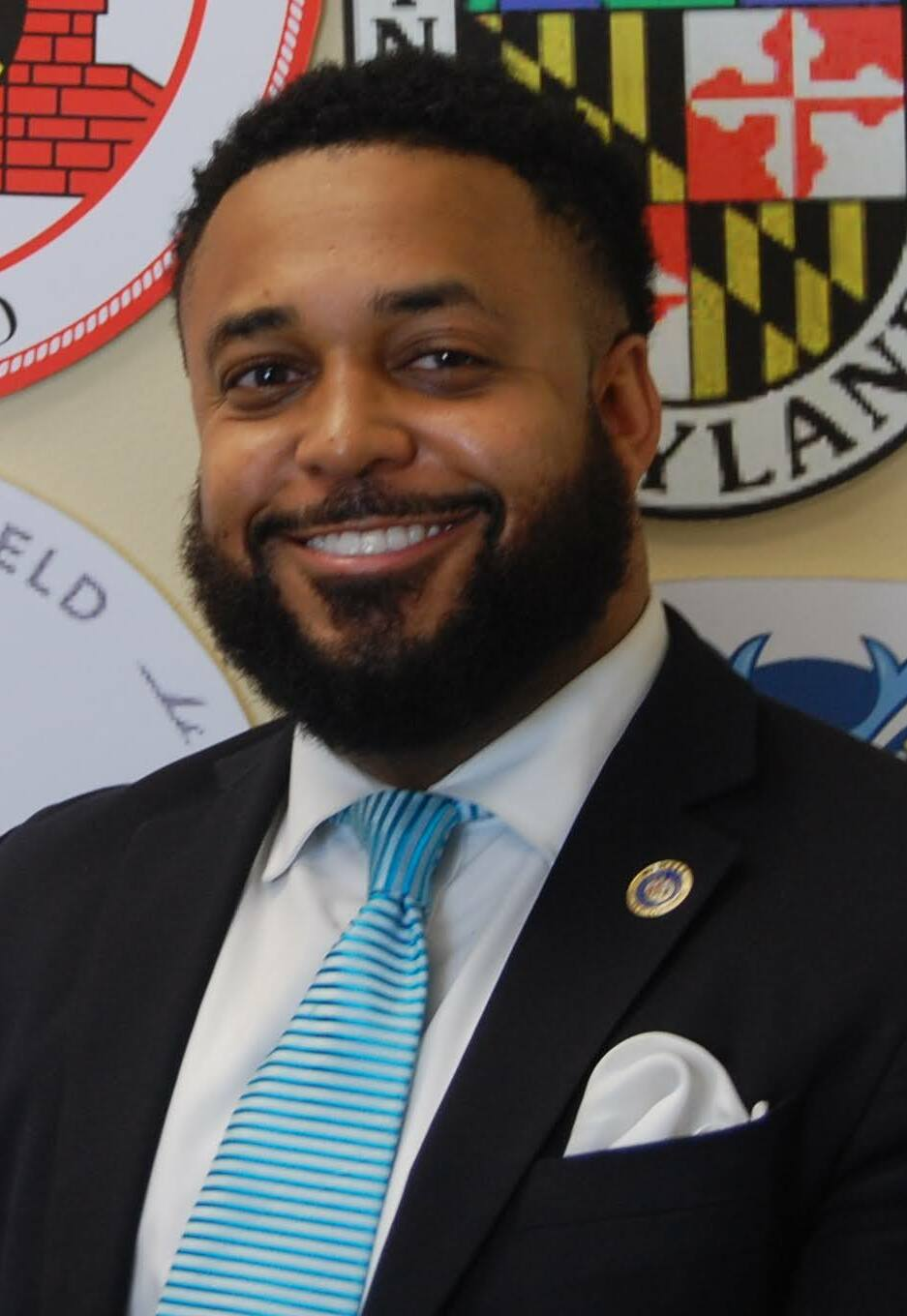
Candidate	Nick Charles
Party	Democratic
State Senator before election
Nick Charles
Democratic
Elected State Senator
Nick Charles
Democratic

The 25th district consists of Forestville, Westphalia, and Kettering. Nick Charles was appointed to the seat by Governor Wes Moore in December 2023 after two-term Democratic incumbent Melony G. Griffith resigned to become the president of the Maryland Hospital Association. Griffith won re-election to the seat with 99.5 percent of the vote in 2022.

=== Democratic primary ===
==== Nominee ====
- Nick Charles, incumbent state senator

==== Endorsements ====
Nick Charles

Statewide officials

- Wes Moore, Maryland governor (2023–present)

Labor unions

- AFSCME Council 3
- LIUNA Philadelphia/Baltimore/Washington Laborers' District Council
- United Food and Commercial Workers Local 1994 MCGEO

Organizations

- Chesapeake Climate Action Network
- Maryland Sierra Club
- VoteVets.org

Newspapers

- Baltimore Afro-American

==== Fundraising ====
Campaign finance reports as of June 7, 2026
Candidate	Raised	Spent	Cash on hand
Nick Charles (D)	$318,475	$222,847	$139,660
Source: Maryland State Board of Elections

==== Results ====
Democratic primary results
Party	Candidate	Votes	%
Democratic	Nick Charles (incumbent)	20,513	100.00%
Total votes		20,513	100.00%

=== General election ===
==== Fundraising ====
Campaign finance reports as of November 10, 2026
Candidate	Raised	Spent	Cash on hand
Nick Charles (D)	$320,060	$273,592	$90,500
Source: Maryland State Board of Elections

==== Results ====
2026 Maryland Senate 25th District election
Party	Candidate	Votes	%	±%
Democratic	Nick Charles (incumbent)			
Write-in				
Total votes				

== District 26 ==
2026 Maryland Senate 26th District election
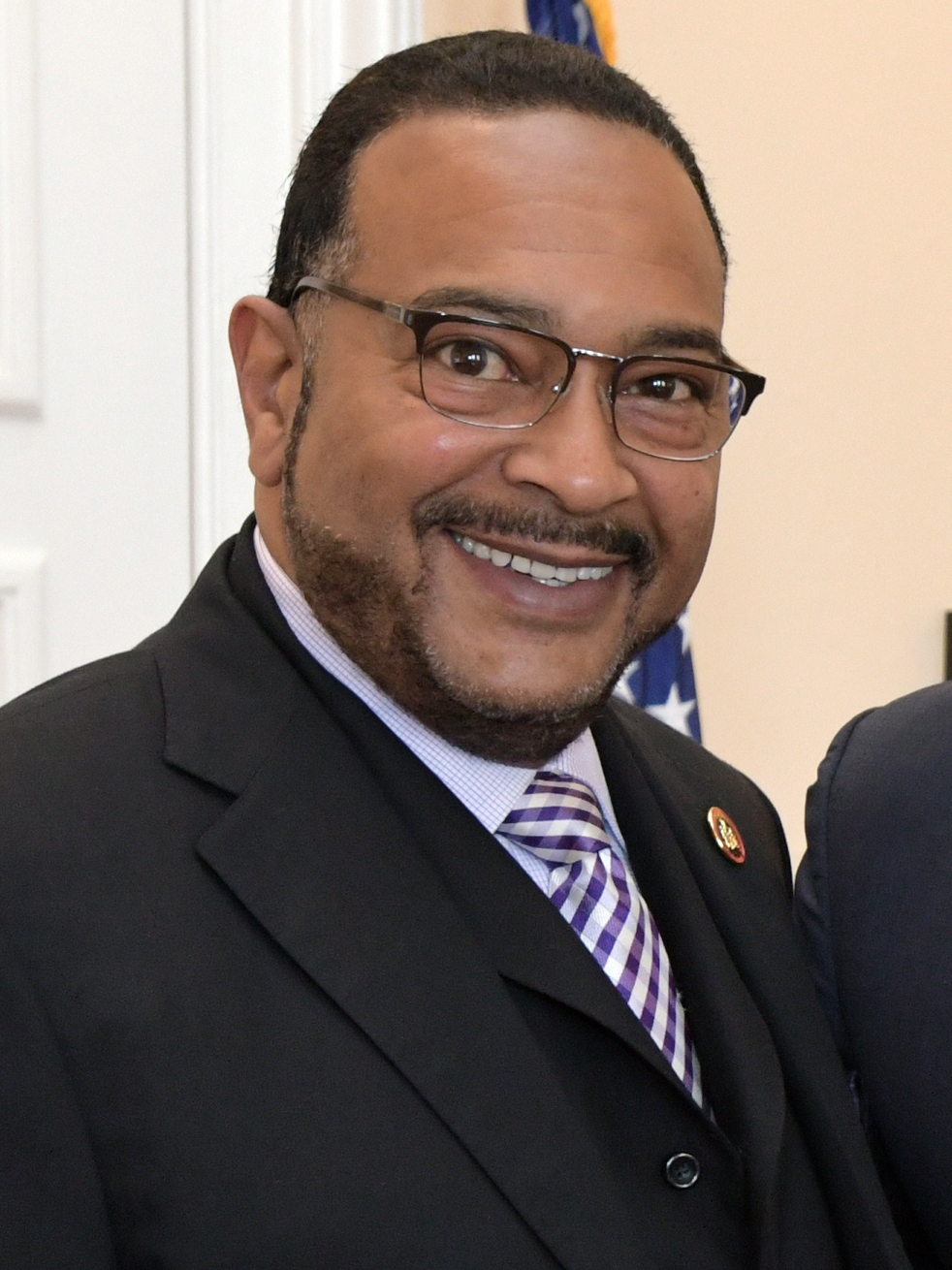
Candidate	C. Anthony Muse
Party	Democratic
State Senator before election
C. Anthony Muse
Democratic
Elected State Senator
C. Anthony Muse
Democratic

The 26th district consists of Friendly, Oxon Hill, and Fort Washington. One-term Democratic incumbent C. Anthony Muse won election to the seat with 92.3 percent of the vote in 2022.

=== Democratic primary ===
==== Nominee ====
- C. Anthony Muse, incumbent state senator

==== Eliminated in primary ====
- Antonio Driver, teacher and former LGBTQIA+ liaison for Prince George's County

==== Endorsements ====
C. Anthony Muse

Statewide officials

- Wes Moore, Maryland governor (2023–present)

Labor unions

- Amalgamated Transit Union Local 689
- AFSCME Council 3
- LIUNA Philadelphia/Baltimore/Washington Laborers' District Council
- Maryland State & DC AFL-CIO
- Maryland State Education Association
- Service Employees International Union Local 500
- United Food and Commercial Workers Local 1994 MCGEO

Organizations

- CASA in Action
- Chesapeake Climate Action Network
- Maryland Sierra Club

Newspapers

- Baltimore Afro-American

==== Fundraising ====
Campaign finance reports as of June 7, 2026
Candidate	Raised	Spent	Cash on hand
C. Anthony Muse (D)	$92,484	$78,189	$65,826
Source: Maryland State Board of Elections

==== Results ====
Democratic primary results
Party	Candidate	Votes	%
Democratic	C. Anthony Muse (incumbent)	16,743	84.69%
Democratic	Antonio Driver	3,027	15.31%
Total votes		19,770	100.00%

=== General election ===
==== Fundraising ====
Campaign finance reports as of November 10, 2026
Candidate	Raised	Spent	Cash on hand
C. Anthony Muse (D)	$100,921	$88,555	$63,897
Source: Maryland State Board of Elections

==== Results ====
2026 Maryland Senate 26th District election
Party	Candidate	Votes	%	±%
Democratic	C. Anthony Muse (incumbent)			
Write-in				
Total votes				

== District 27 ==
2026 Maryland Senate 27th District election
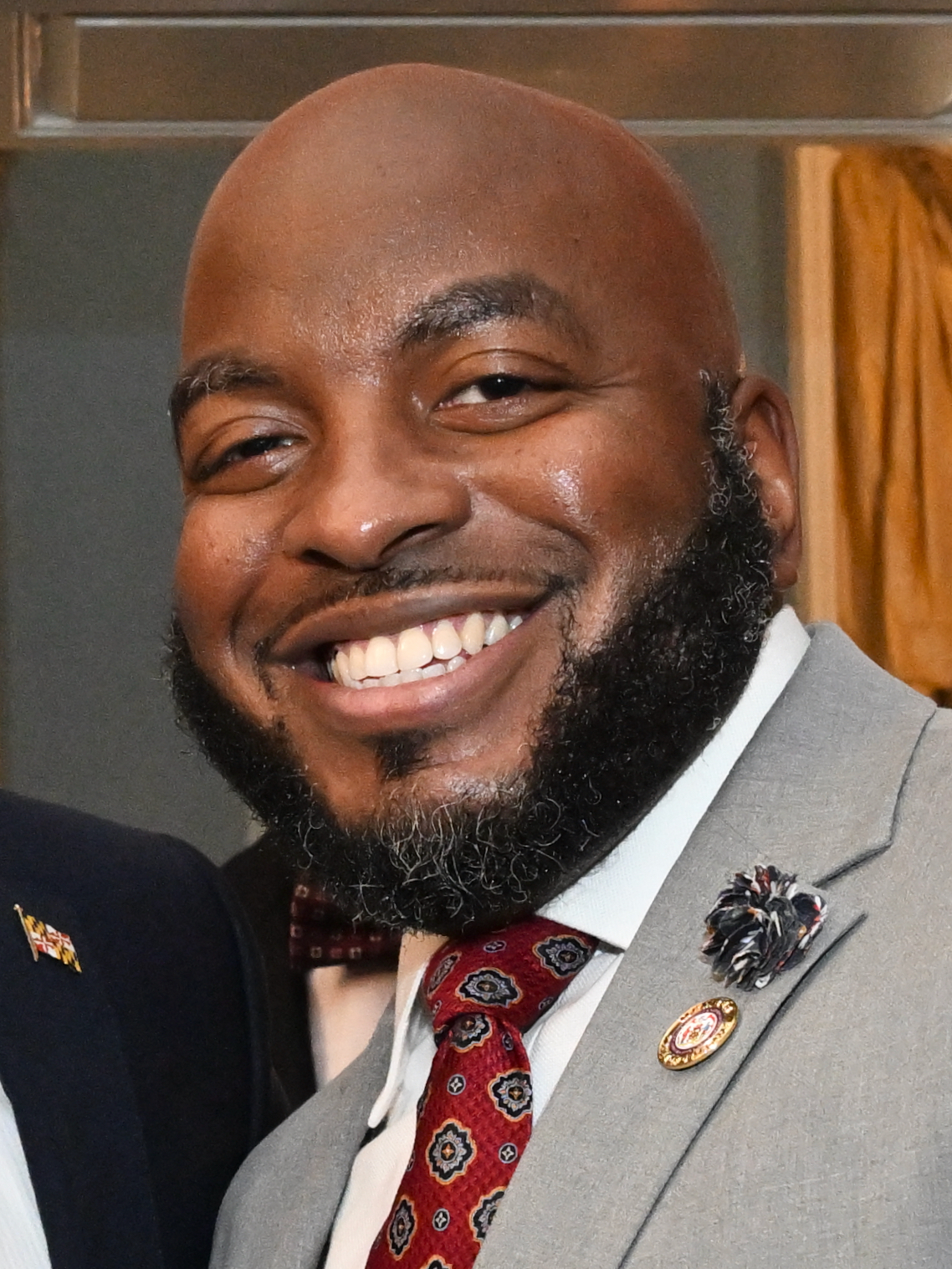

Candidate	Kevin Harris	Al Larsen
Party	Democratic	Republican
State Senator before election
Kevin Harris
Democratic
Elected State Senator
Kevin Harris
Democratic

The 27th district consists of parts of Calvert, Charles, and Prince George's counties, including Chesapeake Beach and Waldorf. One-term Democratic incumbent Michael Jackson won election to the seat with 60.3 percent of the vote in 2022. On November 1, 2025, Jackson resigned from the Maryland Senate after Governor Wes Moore named him as the Maryland Secretary of State Police. The Charles, Calvert, and Prince George's Democratic Central Committees nominated state delegate Kevin Harris to serve the remainder of Jackson's term in November 2025.

=== Democratic primary ===
==== Nominee ====
- Kevin Harris, incumbent state senator

==== Eliminated in primary ====
- Jason Fowler, attorney and nominee for HD-27C in 2018

==== Withdrawn ====
- Michael Jackson, state senator from the 27th district (2021–2025)

==== Endorsements ====
Jason Fowler

Organizations

- Maryland National Organization for Women
- Our Revolution
Kevin Harris

U.S. senators

- Angela Alsobrooks, U.S. senator from Maryland (2025–present)

U.S. representatives

- Steny Hoyer, MD-05 (1981–present)

Statewide officials

- Brooke Lierman, Maryland Comptroller (2023–present)
- Wes Moore, Maryland governor (2023–present)

Labor unions

- Amalgamated Transit Union Local 689
- AFSCME Council 3
- LIUNA Philadelphia/Baltimore/Washington Laborers' District Council
- Maryland State & DC AFL-CIO
- Maryland State Education Association
- United Food and Commercial Workers Local 1994 MCGEO

Organizations

- CASA in Action
- Chesapeake Climate Action Network
- Maryland Farm Bureau
- Moms Demand Action

Newspapers

- Baltimore Afro-American

==== Fundraising ====
Campaign finance reports as of June 7, 2026
Candidate	Raised	Spent	Cash on hand
Jason Fowler (D)	$18,676	$40,751	$37,578
Kevin Harris (D)	$147,162	$154,879	$29,544
Source: Maryland State Board of Elections

==== Results ====
Results by precinct Harris: 50–60%; 60–70%; 70–80%; 80–90%; Fowler: 50–60%; 60–70%

Democratic primary results
Party	Candidate	Votes	%
Democratic	Kevin Harris (incumbent)	10,927	66.04%
Democratic	Jason Fowler	5,619	33.96%
Total votes		16,546	100.00%

=== Republican primary ===
==== Nominee ====
- Al Larsen, U.S. Navy veteran and nominee for this district in 2022

==== Endorsements ====
Al Larsen

Organizations

- Maryland Right to Life

==== Fundraising ====
Campaign finance reports as of June 7, 2026
Candidate	Raised	Spent	Cash on hand
Al Larsen (R)	$2,664	$434	$804
Source: Maryland State Board of Elections

==== Results ====
Republican primary results
Party	Candidate	Votes	%
Republican	Al Larsen	5,051	100.00%
Total votes		5,051	100.00%

=== General election ===
==== Fundraising ====
Campaign finance reports as of November 10, 2026
Candidate	Raised	Spent	Cash on hand
Kevin Harris (D)	$248,604	$198,017	$8,834
Al Larsen (R)	$7,521	$3,304	$780
Source: Maryland State Board of Elections

==== Results ====
2026 Maryland Senate 27th District election
Party	Candidate	Votes	%	±%
Democratic	Kevin Harris (incumbent)			
Republican	Al Larsen			
Write-in				
Total votes				

== District 28 ==
2026 Maryland Senate 28th District election
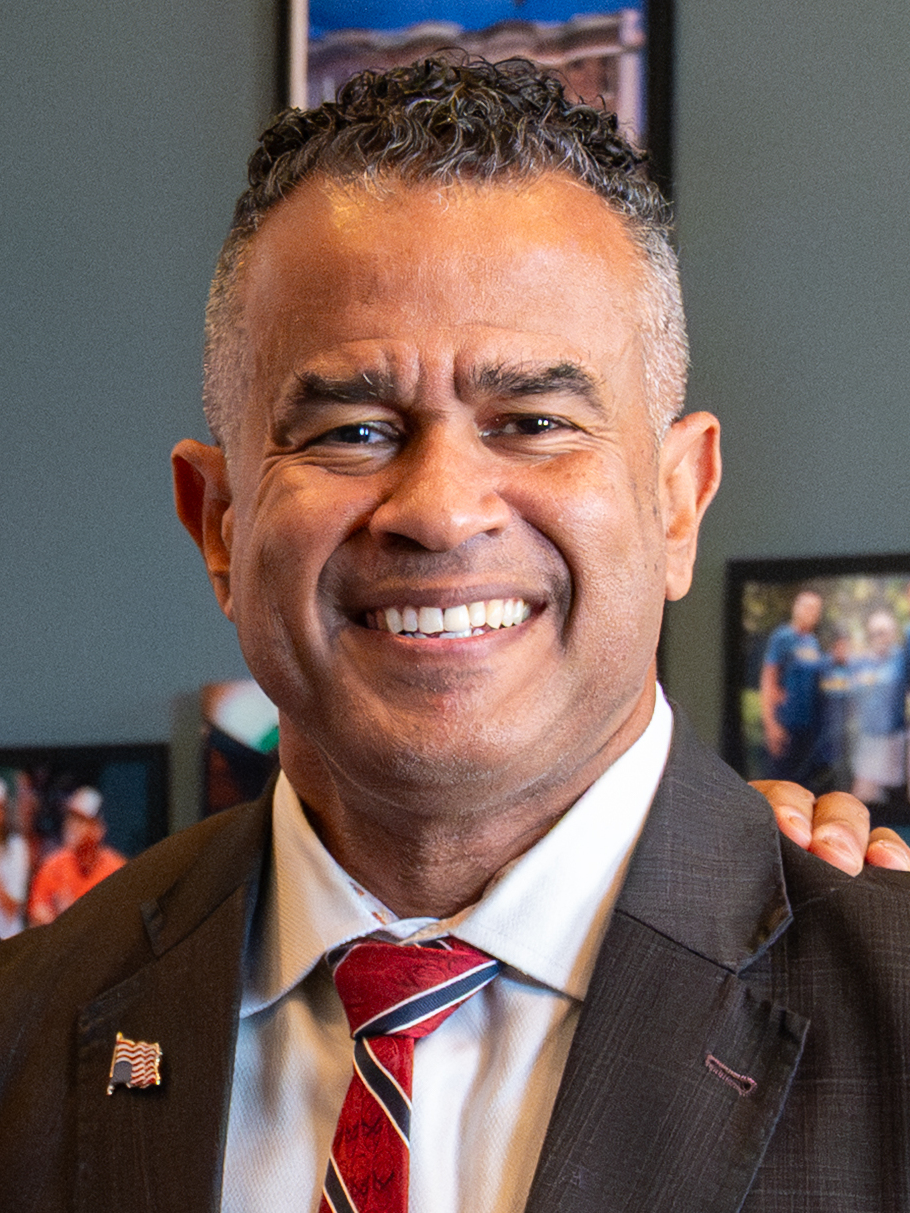
Candidate	C. T. Wilson
Party	Democratic
Popular vote	48,477
Percentage	97.0%
State Senator before election
Arthur Ellis
Democratic
Elected State Senator
C. T. Wilson
Democratic

The 28th district encompasses most of Charles County. Two-term Democratic incumbent Arthur Ellis won re-election to the seat with 67.0 percent of the vote in 2022.

=== Democratic primary ===
==== Nominee ====
- C. T. Wilson, state delegate from the 28th district (2011–present)

==== Eliminated in primary ====
- Aaron Corbin, Washington Metropolitan Area Transit Authority compliance manager

==== Declined ====
- Arthur Ellis, incumbent state senator (ran for MD-05)

==== Endorsements ====
Aaron Corbin

Organizations

- Moms Demand Action
C. T. Wilson

Statewide officials

- Wes Moore, Maryland governor (2023–present)

Labor unions

- Maryland State Education Association

Organizations

- Chesapeake Climate Action Network

Newspapers

- Baltimore Afro-American

==== Fundraising ====
Campaign finance reports as of May 12, 2026
Candidate	Raised	Spent	Cash on hand
Aaron Corbin (D)	<$1,000	<$1,000	N/A
C. T. Wilson (D)	$432,065	$266,567	$183,964
Source: Maryland State Board of Elections

==== Results ====
Democratic primary results
Party	Candidate	Votes	%
Democratic	C. T. Wilson	13,472	75.47%
Democratic	Aaron Corbin	4,379	24.53%
Total votes		17,851	100.00%

=== General election ===
==== Fundraising ====
Campaign finance reports as of November 10, 2026
Candidate	Raised	Spent	Cash on hand
C. T. Wilson (D)	$464,340	$332,386	$150,420
Source: Maryland State Board of Elections

==== Results ====
2026 Maryland Senate 28th District election
Party	Candidate	Votes	%	±%
Democratic	C. T. Wilson	48,477	97.02%	+29.98%
Write-in		1,487	2.98%	+2.84%
Total votes		49,964	100.00%	

== District 29 ==
2026 Maryland Senate 29th District election
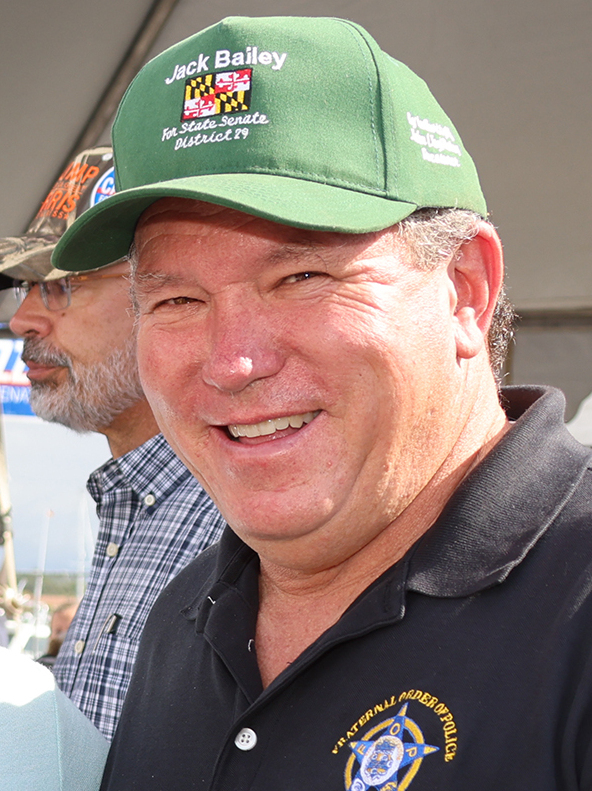

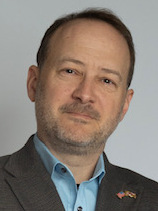
Candidate	Jack Bailey	Chuck Borges
Party	Republican	Democratic
Popular vote	27,655	23,103
Percentage	54.4%	45.5%
- Precinct results Bailey: 50–60% 60–70% 70–80% 80–90% Borges: 50–60% 60–70% 70–80% Tie: 50%
State Senator before election
Jack Bailey
Republican
Elected State Senator
Jack Bailey
Republican

The 29th district encompasses all of St. Mary's County and south Calvert County. Two-term Republican incumbent Jack Bailey won re-election to the seat with 96.4 percent of the vote in 2022.

=== Republican primary ===
==== Nominee ====
- Jack Bailey, incumbent state senator

==== Endorsements ====
Jack Bailey

Organizations

- Maryland Farm Bureau
- Maryland Right to Life

==== Fundraising ====
Campaign finance reports as of June 7, 2026
Candidate	Raised	Spent	Cash on hand
Jack Bailey (R)	$351,742	$202,062	$388,360
Source: Maryland State Board of Elections

==== Results ====
Republican primary results
Party	Candidate	Votes	%
**Republican**	**Jack Bailey (incumbent)**	**6,590**	**100.00%**
Total votes		**6,590**	**100.00%**

=== Democratic primary ===
==== Nominee ====
- Chuck Borges, former chief data officer of the Social Security Administration and whistleblower

==== Endorsements ====
Endorsements in bold were made after the primary elections.

Chuck Borges

Labor unions

- Maryland State Education Association

Organizations

- 314 Action
- **Maryland Forward Party**
- Maryland Sierra Club
- VoteVets.org

==== Fundraising ====
Campaign finance reports as of June 7, 2026
Candidate	Raised	Spent	Cash on hand
Chuck Borges (D)	$67,232	$17,168	$42,064
Source: Maryland State Board of Elections

==== Results ====
Democratic primary results
Party	Candidate	Votes	%
**Democratic**	**Chuck Borges**	**6,837**	**100.00%**
Total votes		**6,837**	**100.00%**

=== General election ===
==== Fundraising ====
Campaign finance reports as of November 10, 2026
Candidate	Raised	Spent	Cash on hand
Jack Bailey (R)	$431,608	$432,779	$237,509
Chuck Borges (D)	$107,179	$85,615	$10,806
Source: Maryland State Board of Elections

==== Results ====
2026 Maryland Senate 29th District election
Party	Candidate	Votes	%	±%
**Republican**	**Jack Bailey (incumbent)**	**27,655**	**54.44%**	**−41.91%**
Democratic	Chuck Borges	23,103	45.48%	N/A
Write-in		45	0.09%	-3.56%
Total votes		**50,803**	**100.00%**	

== District 30 ==
2026 Maryland Senate 30th District election
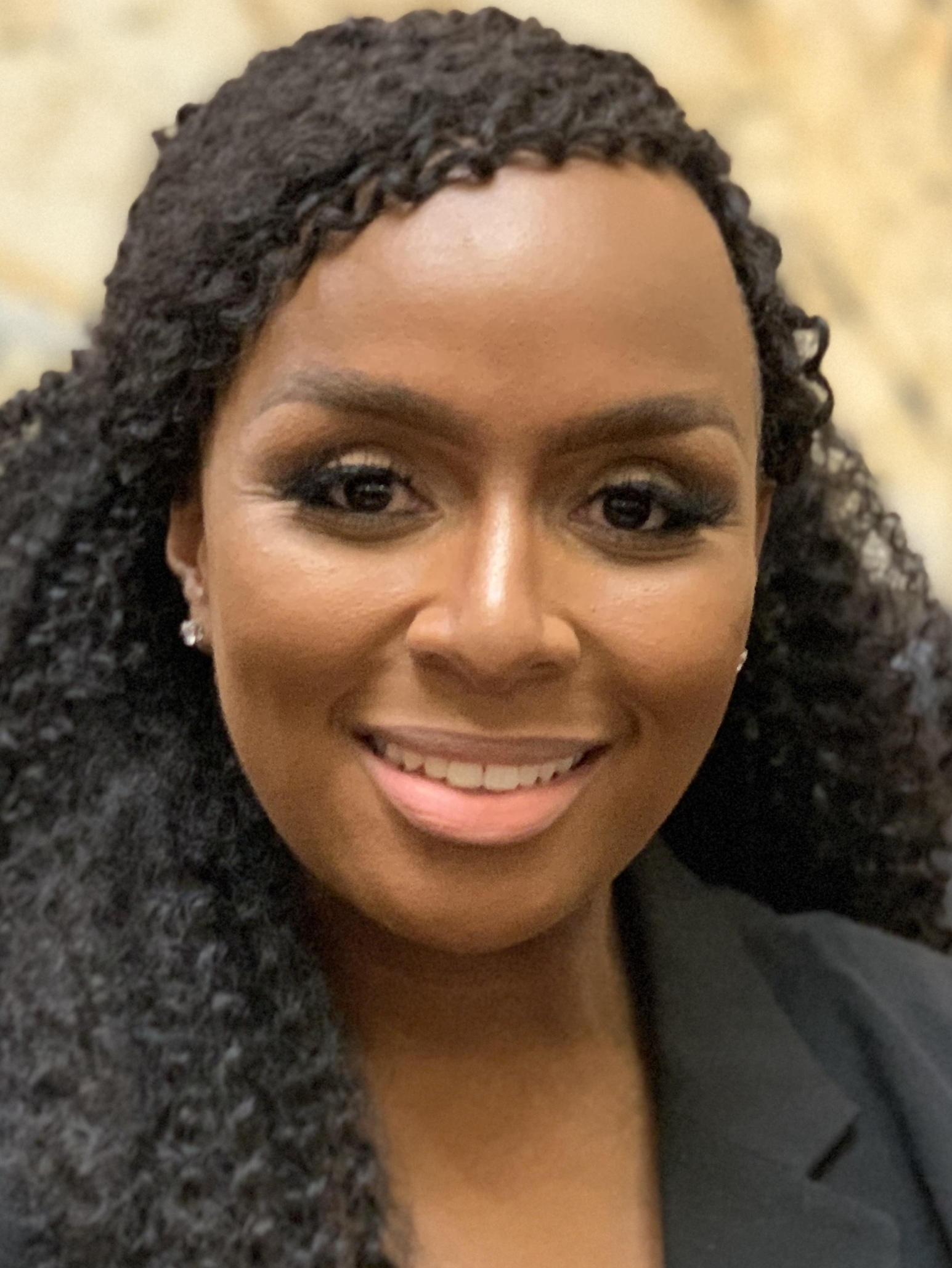

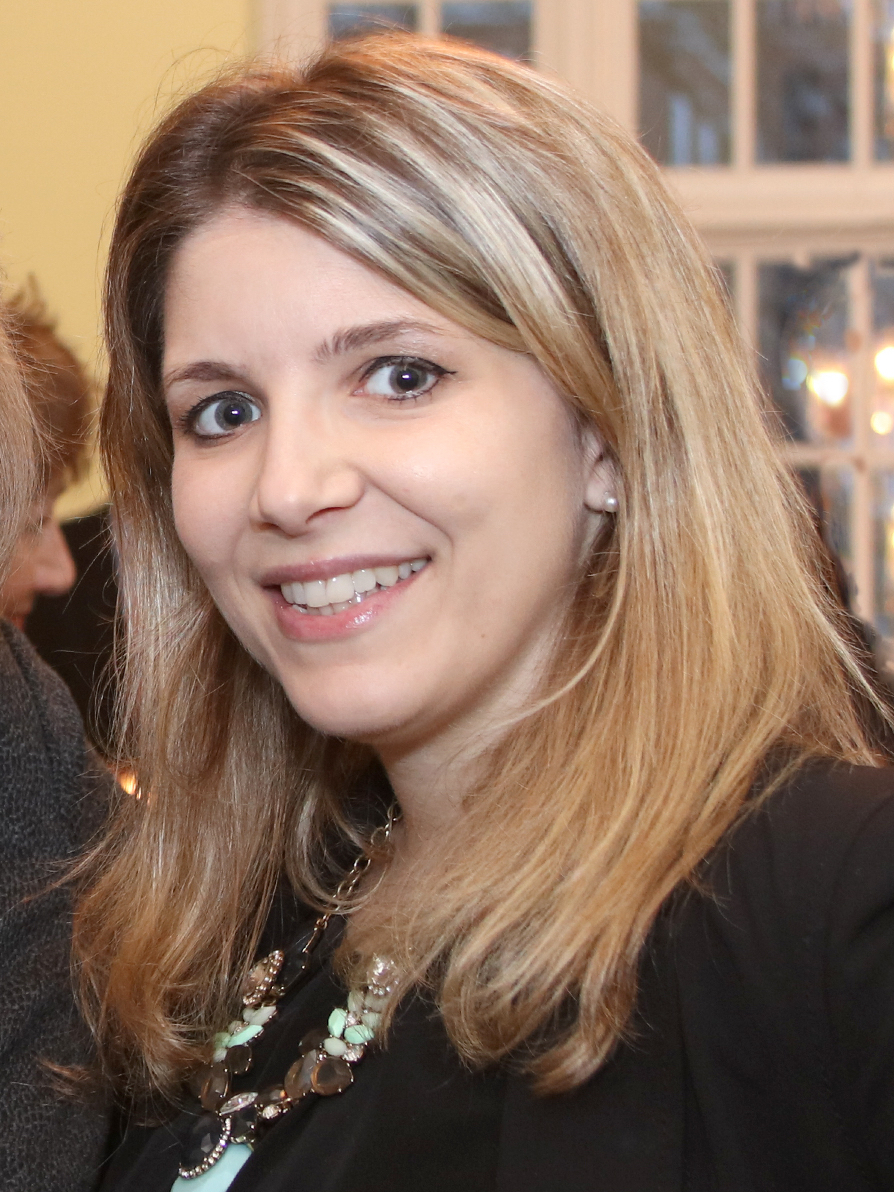
Candidate	Shaneka Henson	Jessica Haire
Party	Democratic	Republican
Popular vote	31,776	22,043
Percentage	58.9%	40.9%
- Precinct results Henson: 50–60% 60–70% 70–80% 80–90% Haire: 50–60% 60–70%
State Senator before election
Shaneka Henson
Democratic
Elected State Senator
Shaneka Henson
Democratic

The 30th district encompasses south Anne Arundel County, including the state capital, Annapolis. Two-term Democratic incumbent Sarah Elfreth won re-election to the seat with 57.4 percent of the vote in 2022, but resigned in January 2025 after winning election to the U.S. House of Representatives. The Anne Arundel County Democratic Central Committee appointed state delegate Shaneka Henson to the seat in January 2025.

Maryland Matters described District 30 as "one of the most heated legislative races in the general election, with charges of ethics violations and racism and a vocal split by Democrats dismayed by Henson's more moderate stance on social issues like abortion and LGBTQ+ rights", which has boosted the odds of Republican nominee Jessica Haire winning the district. During the general election, Haire has criticized Henson's voting record during her tenure in the Maryland House of Delegates, as well as a 2024 letter from the Joint Committee on Legislative Ethics that urged Henson to apologize for her involvement in funding requests for a religious organization to which she belonged. Henson, meanwhile, has focused on the potentially historic nature of her campaign; if she wins election to a full four-year term, she would be the first African-American senator elected to represent Anne Arundel County.

=== Democratic primary ===
==== Nominee ====
- Shaneka Henson, incumbent state senator

==== Endorsements ====
Endorsements in bold were made after the primary elections.

Shaneka Henson

U.S. representatives

- **Sarah Elfreth**, MD-03 (2025–present)

Statewide officials

- Wes Moore, Maryland governor (2023–present)

State legislators

- **Malcolm Augustine**, SD-47 (2019–present)
- **Benjamin Brooks**, SD-10 (2023–present)
- **Debra Davis**, HD-28 (2019–present)
- **Bill Ferguson**, president of the Maryland Senate (2020–present) from SD-46 (2011–present)
- **Mike Rogers**, HD-32 (2019–present)
- **Malcolm Ruff**, HD-41 (2023–present)
- **Will Smith**, SD-20 (2016–present)
- **Charles E. Sydnor III**, SD-44 (2020–present)
- **Kym Taylor**, HD-23 (2023–present)

County officials

- **Steuart Pittman**, Anne Arundel County executive (2018–present) and chair of the Maryland Democratic Party (2025–present)

Labor unions

- AFSCME Council 3
- LIUNA Philadelphia/Baltimore/Washington Laborers' District Council
- Maryland State & DC AFL-CIO
- Service Employees International Union Local 500
- United Food and Commercial Workers Local 1994 MCGEO

Organizations

- Council on American–Islamic Relations Action
- Maryland League of Conservation Voters
- Maryland Sierra Club
- Moms Demand Action

Newspapers

- Baltimore Afro-American

==== Fundraising ====
Campaign finance reports as of June 7, 2026
Candidate	Raised	Spent	Cash on hand
Shaneka Henson (D)	$175,964	$76,892	$136,970
Source: Maryland State Board of Elections

==== Results ====
Democratic primary results
Party	Candidate	Votes	%
**Democratic**	**Shaneka Henson (incumbent)**	**12,039**	**100.00%**
Total votes		**12,039**	**100.00%**

=== Republican primary ===
==== Nominee ====
- Jessica Haire, former Anne Arundel County councilmember from the 7th district (2018–2022) and nominee for county executive in 2022

==== Endorsements ====
Endorsements in bold were made after the primary elections.

Jessica Haire

Organizations

- Maryland Farm Bureau
- **Maryland Forward Party**

==== Fundraising ====
Campaign finance reports as of June 7, 2026
Candidate	Raised	Spent	Cash on hand
Jessica Haire (R)	$133,524	$74,236	$160,081
Source: Maryland State Board of Elections

==== Results ====
Republican primary results
Party	Candidate	Votes	%
**Republican**	**Jessica Haire**	**4,105**	**100.00%**
Total votes		**4,105**	**100.00%**

=== General election ===
==== Fundraising ====
Campaign finance reports as of November 10, 2026
Candidate	Raised	Spent	Cash on hand
Shaneka Henson (D)	$316,510	$812,490	$63,412
Jessica Haire (R)	$371,933	$347,935	$37,994
Source: Maryland State Board of Elections

==== Results ====
2026 Maryland Senate 30th District election
Party	Candidate	Votes	%	±%
**Democratic**	**Shaneka Henson (incumbent)**	**31,776**	**58.92%**	**+1.53%**
Republican	Jessica Haire	22,043	40.87%	−1.64%
Write-in		114	0.21%	+0.12%
Total votes		**53,933**	**100.00%**	

== District 31 ==
2026 Maryland Senate 31st District election
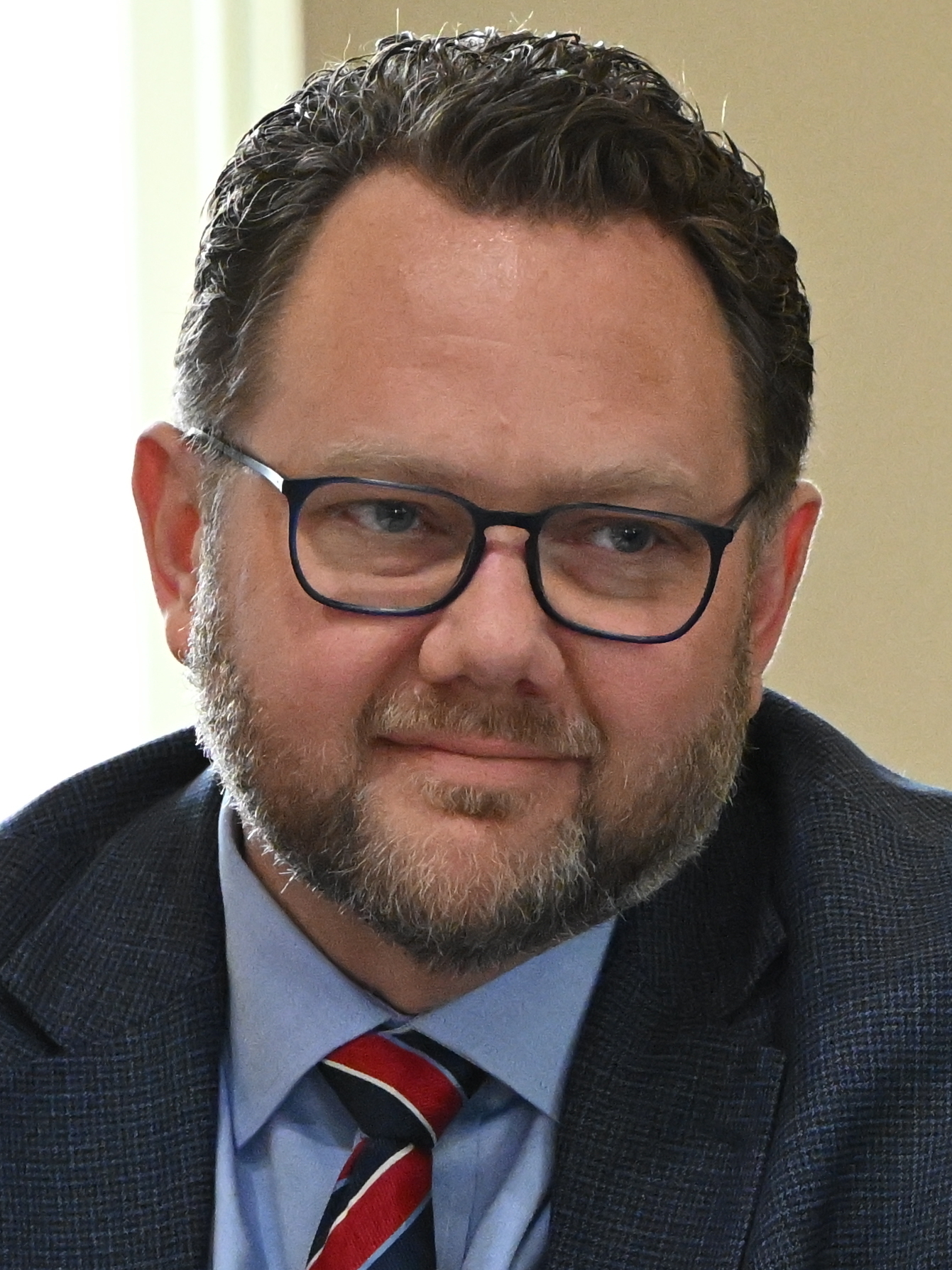

Candidate	Nic Kipke	Brent Mulrooney
Party	Republican	Democratic
Popular vote	29,612	24,783
Percentage	54.4%	45.5%
- Precinct results Kipke: 50–60% 60–70% 70–80% Mulrooney: 50–60% 60–70% 70–80%
State Senator before election
Bryan Simonaire
Republican
Elected State Senator
Nic Kipke
Republican

The 31st district encompasses north Anne Arundel County, including Pasadena, Severn, and Gambrills. Five-term Republican incumbent Bryan Simonaire won re-election to the seat with 71.3 percent of the vote in 2022. On March 25, 2025, Simonaire announced that he would not seek re-election to a sixth term.

=== Republican primary ===
==== Nominee ====
- Nic Kipke, state delegate from the 31st district (2007–present)

==== Declined ====
- Bryan Simonaire, incumbent state senator (endorsed Kipke)

==== Endorsements ====
Nic Kipke

State legislators

- Bryan Simonaire, state senator from the 31st district (2007–present)

Organizations

- Maryland Farm Bureau
- Maryland Right to Life

==== Fundraising ====
Campaign finance reports as of June 7, 2026
Candidate	Raised	Spent	Cash on hand
Nic Kipke (R)	$299,483	$213,119	$208,180
Source: Maryland State Board of Elections

==== Results ====
Republican primary results
Party	Candidate	Votes	%
**Republican**	**Nic Kipke**	**6,223**	**100.00%**
Total votes		**6,223**	**100.00%**

=== Democratic primary ===
==== Nominee ====
- Brent Mulrooney, U.S. Air Force reservist

==== Endorsements ====
Endorsements in bold were made after the primary elections.

Brent Mulrooney

Labor unions

- Maryland State Education Association

Organizations

- 314 Action
- **Maryland Forward Party**
- **Maryland Sierra Club**
- **Moms Demand Action**
- **VoteVets.org**

==== Fundraising ====
Campaign finance reports as of June 7, 2026
Candidate	Raised	Spent	Cash on hand
Brent Mulrooney (D)	$15,793	$7,342	$7,955
Source: Maryland State Board of Elections

==== Results ====
Democratic primary results
Party	Candidate	Votes	%
**Democratic**	**Brent Mulrooney**	**7,487**	**100.00%**
Total votes		**7,487**	**100.00%**

=== General election ===
==== Fundraising ====
Campaign finance reports as of November 10, 2026
Candidate	Raised	Spent	Cash on hand
Nic Kipke (R)	$427,304	$446,010	$99,911
Brent Mulrooney (D)	$23,523	$21,864	$1,094
Source: Maryland State Board of Elections

==== Results ====
2026 Maryland Senate 31st District election
Party	Candidate	Votes	%	±%
**Republican**	**Nic Kipke**	**29,612**	**54.38%**	**−16.87%**
Democratic	Brent Mulrooney	24,783	45.51%	N/A
Write-in		56	0.10%	-1.41%
Total votes		**54,451**	**100.00%**	

== District 32 ==
2026 Maryland Senate 32nd District election
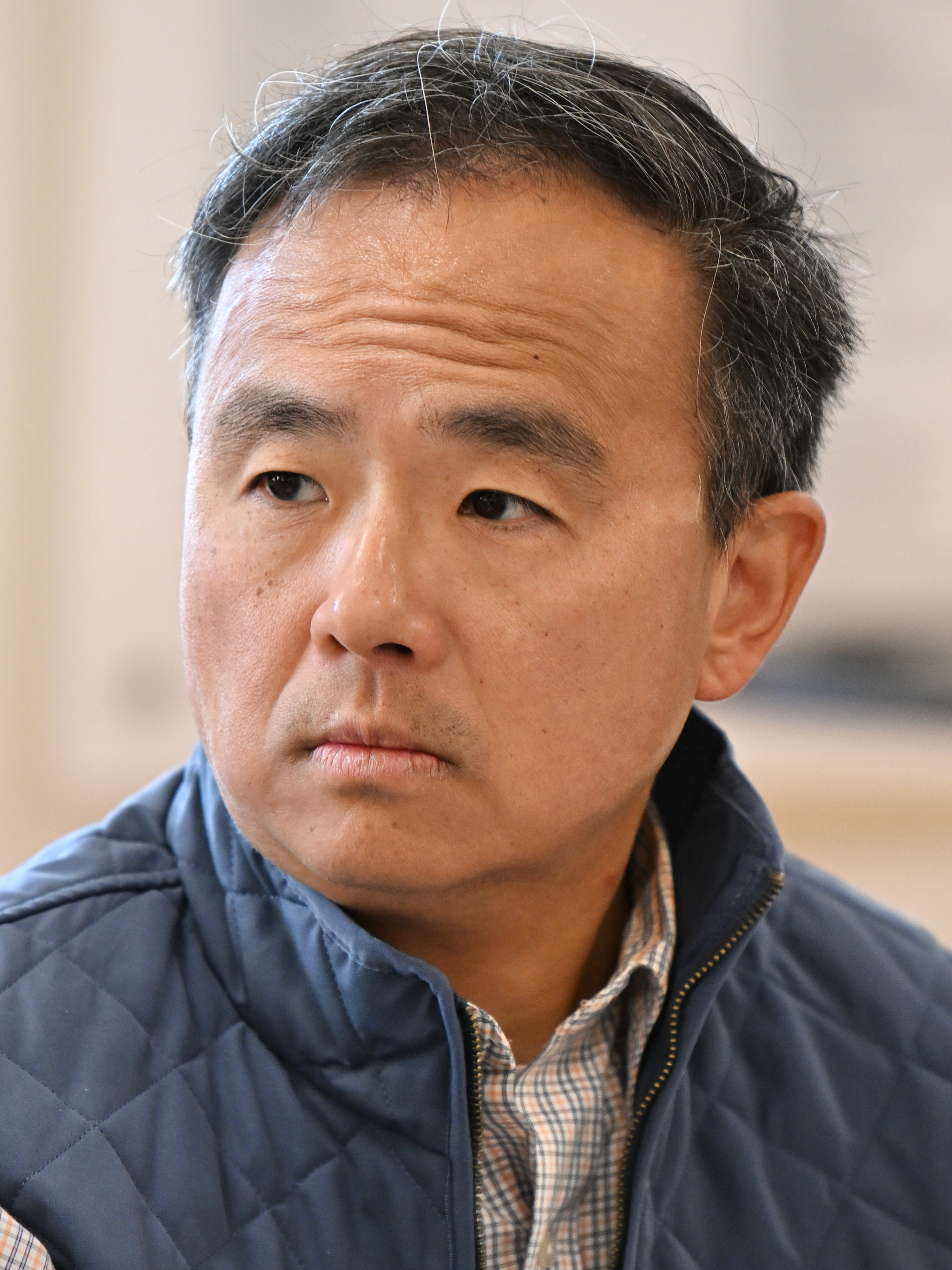

Candidate	Mark S. Chang	Justin Gallucci
Party	Democratic	Republican
Popular vote	30,932	11,040
Percentage	73.6%	26.3%
- Precinct results Chang: 50–60% 60–70% 70–80% 80–90% >90%
State Senator before election
Pamela Beidle
Democratic
Elected State Senator
Mark S. Chang
Democratic

The 32nd district encompasses part of north Anne Arundel County, including Glen Burnie and Fort Meade. Two-term Democratic incumbent Pamela Beidle won re-election to the seat with 65.8 percent of the vote in 2022.

=== Democratic primary ===
==== Nominee ====
- Mark S. Chang, state delegate from the 32nd district (2015–present)

==== Eliminated in primary ====
- Stephen Tillett, pastor and U.S. Air Force veteran

==== Withdrawn ====
- Pamela Beidle, incumbent state senator (endorsed Chang)

==== Endorsements ====
Endorsements in bold were made after the primary elections.

Mark S. Chang

U.S. representatives

- Sarah Elfreth, MD-03 (2025–present)

Statewide officials

- Wes Moore, Maryland governor (2023–present)

State legislators

- Pamela Beidle, state senator from the 32nd district (2019–present)

Labor unions

- AFSCME Council 3
- LIUNA Philadelphia/Baltimore/Washington Laborers' District Council
- Maryland State & DC AFL-CIO
- **Maryland State Education Association**
- Service Employees International Union Local 500
- United Food and Commercial Workers Local 1994 MCGEO

Organizations

- CASA in Action
- Chesapeake Climate Action Network
- Maryland League of Conservation Voters
- Maryland Sierra Club
- Moms Demand Action
Stephen Tillett

State legislators

- C. Anthony Muse, state senator from the 26th district (2007–2019, 2023–present)

Organizations

- Moms Demand Action

==== Fundraising ====
Campaign finance reports as of June 7, 2026
Candidate	Raised	Spent	Cash on hand
Mark Chang (D)	$170,036	$139,079	$74,855
Stephen Tillett (D)	$15,794	$12,814	$3,129
Source: Maryland State Board of Elections

==== Results ====
Results by precinct Chang: 50–60%; 60–70%; 70–80%; 80–90%; >90%; Tillett: 50–60%

Democratic primary results
Party	Candidate	Votes	%
**Democratic**	**Mark S. Chang**	**6,827**	**65.87%**
Democratic	Stephen Tillett	3,538	34.13%
Total votes		**10,365**	**100.00%**

=== Republican primary ===
==== Nominee ====
- Justin Gallucci, realtor

==== Results ====
Republican primary results
Party	Candidate	Votes	%
**Republican**	**Justin Gallucci**	**2,360**	**100.00%**
Total votes		**2,360**	**100.00%**

=== General election ===
==== Fundraising ====
Campaign finance reports as of November 10, 2026
Candidate	Raised	Spent	Cash on hand
Mark Chang (D)	$233,802	$213,340	$63,318
Source: Maryland State Board of Elections

==== Results ====
2026 Maryland Senate 32nd District election
Party	Candidate	Votes	%	±%
**Democratic**	**Mark S. Chang**	**30,932**	**73.60%**	**+7.85%**
Republican	Justin Gallucci	11,040	26.27%	−7.77%
Write-in		55	0.13%	-0.08%
Total votes		**42,027**	**100.00%**	

== District 33 ==
2026 Maryland Senate 33rd District election
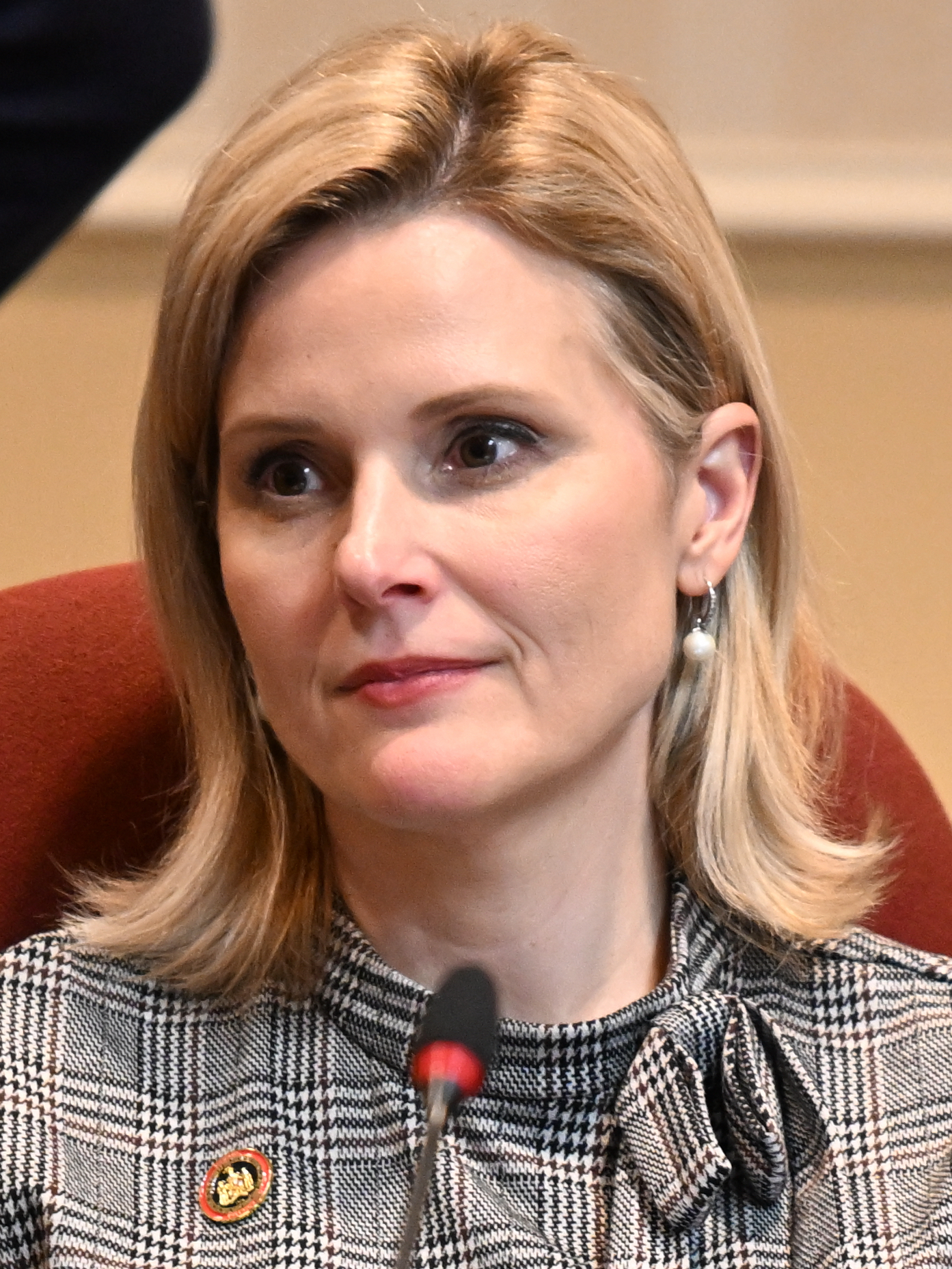

Candidate	Dawn Gile	Amy Leahy
Party	Democratic	Republican
Popular vote	37,066	20,972
Percentage	63.8%	36.1%
- Precinct results Gile: 50–60% 60–70% 70–80% 80–90% >90% Leahy: 50–60% >90% Tie: 40–50%
State Senator before election
Dawn Gile
Democratic
Elected State Senator
Dawn Gile
Democratic

The 33rd district encompasses central Anne Arundel County, including Cape St. Claire, Severna Park, Odenton, and Crofton. One-term Democratic incumbent Dawn Gile won election to the seat with 55.4 percent of the vote in 2022.

=== Democratic primary ===
==== Nominee ====
- Dawn Gile, incumbent state senator

==== Endorsements ====
Dawn Gile

Statewide officials

- Wes Moore, Maryland governor (2023–present)

Labor unions

- AFSCME Council 3
- LIUNA Philadelphia/Baltimore/Washington Laborers' District Council
- Maryland State & DC AFL-CIO
- Maryland State Education Association
- Service Employees International Union Local 500
- United Food and Commercial Workers Local 1994 MCGEO

Organizations

- Humane World Action Fund
- Maryland Farm Bureau
- Maryland League of Conservation Voters
- Maryland National Organization for Women
- Maryland Sierra Club
- Moms Demand Action

==== Fundraising ====
Campaign finance reports as of June 7, 2026
Candidate	Raised	Spent	Cash on hand
Dawn Gile (D)	$503,221	$196,906	$310,525
Source: Maryland State Board of Elections

==== Results ====
Democratic primary results
Party	Candidate	Votes	%
Democratic	Dawn Gile (incumbent)	11,522	100.00%
Total votes		11,522	100.00%

=== Republican primary ===
==== Nominee ====
- Amy Leahy, constituent services specialist

==== Endorsements ====
Amy Leahy

Organizations

- Maryland Right to Life

==== Fundraising ====
Campaign finance reports as of June 7, 2026
Candidate	Raised	Spent	Cash on hand
Amy Leahy (R)	$6,963	$1,195	$5,767
Source: Maryland State Board of Elections

==== Results ====
Republican primary results
Party	Candidate	Votes	%
Republican	Amy Leahy	4,187	100.00%
Total votes		4,187	100.00%

=== General election ===
==== Fundraising ====
Campaign finance reports as of November 10, 2026
Candidate	Raised	Spent	Cash on hand
Dawn Gile (D)	$663,978	$339,660	$277,420
Amy Leahy (R)	$50,514	$21,995	$26,774
Source: Maryland State Board of Elections

==== Results ====
2026 Maryland Senate 33rd District election
Party	Candidate	Votes	%	±%
Democratic	Dawn Gile (incumbent)	37,066	63.78%	+8.36%
Republican	Amy Leahy	20,972	36.09%	−8.39%
Write-in		73	0.13%	+0.02%
Total votes		58,111	100.00%	

== District 34 ==
2026 Maryland Senate 34th District election
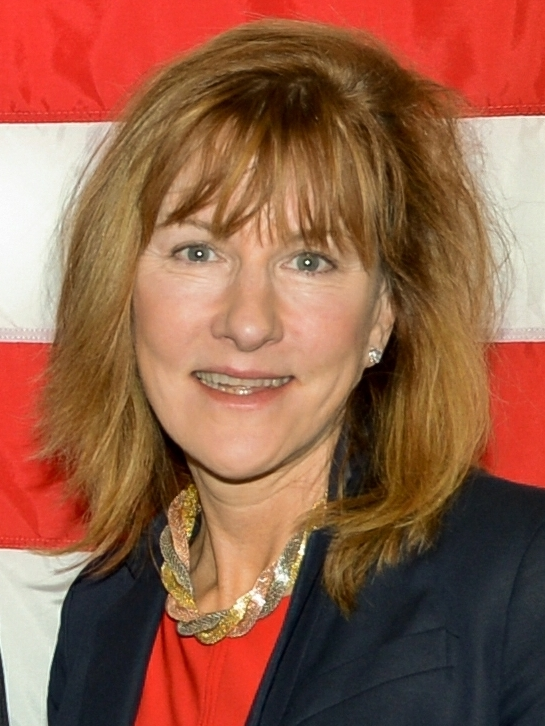

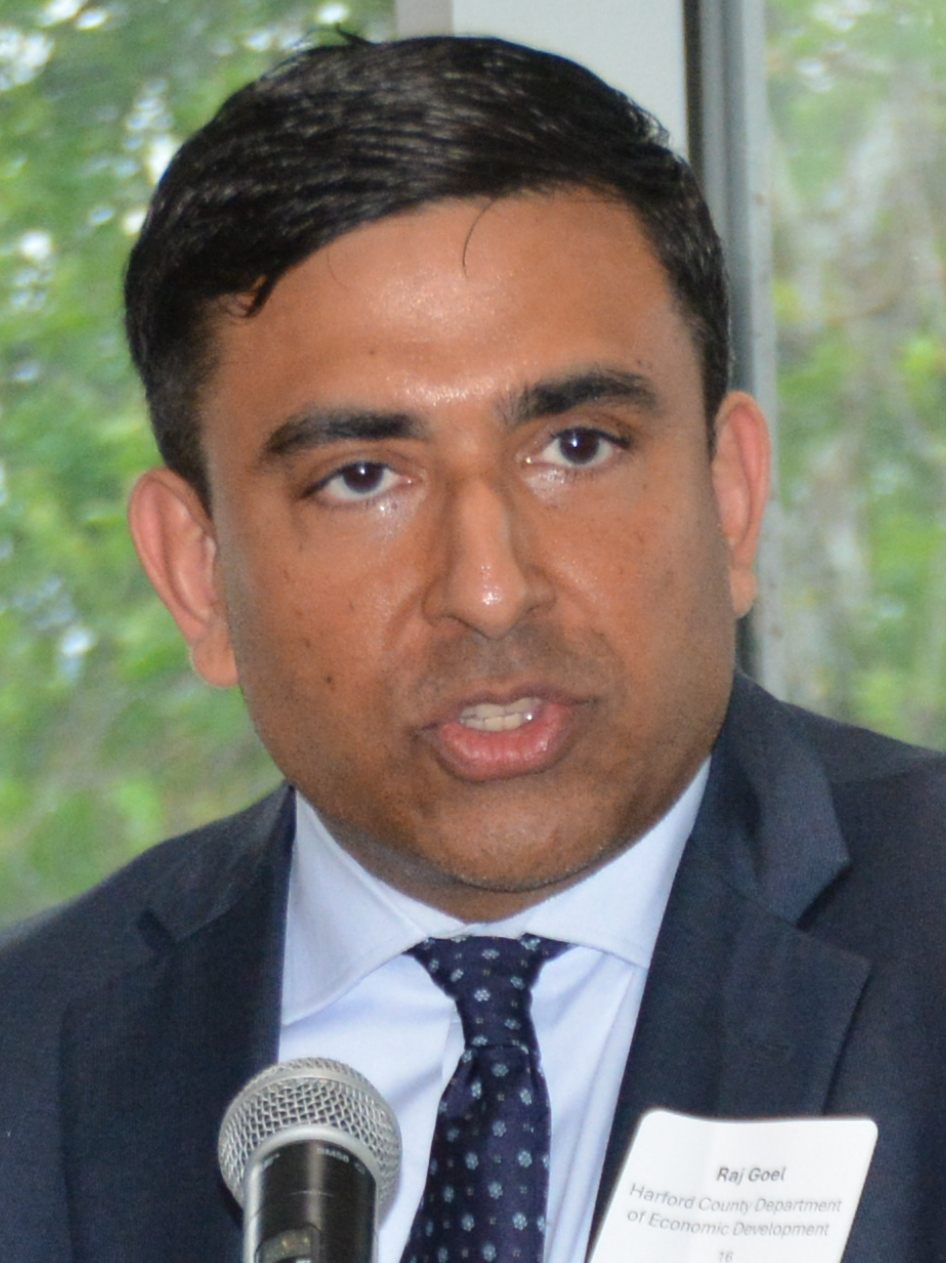
Candidate	Mary-Dulany James	Raj Goel
Party	Democratic	Republican
Popular vote	31,161	20,397
Percentage	60.3%	39.5%
- Precinct results James: 50–60% 60–70% 70–80% 80–90% Goel: 50–60%
State Senator before election
Mary-Dulany James
Democratic
Elected State Senator
Mary-Dulany James
Democratic

The 34th district encompasses south Harford County, including Aberdeen, Edgewood, and Havre de Grace. One-term Democratic incumbent Mary-Dulany James won election to the seat with 50.6 percent of the vote in 2022, the closest election of any Senate race in Maryland that year.

=== Democratic primary ===
==== Nominee ====
- Mary-Dulany James, incumbent state senator

==== Eliminated in primary ====
- Blaine H. Miller III, business owner, nominee for Harford County executive in 2022, and nominee for Maryland's 1st congressional district in 2024

==== Endorsements ====
Mary-Dulany James

Statewide officials

- Wes Moore, Maryland governor (2023–present)

Labor unions

- LIUNA Philadelphia/Baltimore/Washington Laborers' District Council
- Maryland State Education Association

==== Fundraising ====
Campaign finance reports as of June 7, 2026
Candidate	Raised	Spent	Cash on hand
Mary-Dulany James (D)	$318,586	$27,107	$41,966
Blaine Miller (D)	$2,929	$0	$32
Source: Maryland State Board of Elections

==== Results ====
Democratic primary results
Party	Candidate	Votes	%
Democratic	Mary-Dulany James (incumbent)	7,371	80.95%
Democratic	Blane H. Miller, III	1,735	19.05%
Total votes		9,106	100.00%

=== Republican primary ===
==== Nominee ====
- Raj Goel, deputy director of the Harford County Office of Economic Development

==== Endorsements ====
Raj Goel

Organizations

- Maryland Farm Bureau

==== Fundraising ====
Campaign finance reports as of June 7, 2026
Candidate	Raised	Spent	Cash on hand
Raj Goel (R)	$112,173	$34,418	$74,782
Source: Maryland State Board of Elections

==== Results ====
Republican primary results
Party	Candidate	Votes	%
Republican	Raj Goel	6,337	100.00%
Total votes		6,337	100.00%

=== General election ===
==== Fundraising ====
Campaign finance reports as of November 10, 2026
Candidate	Raised	Spent	Cash on hand
Mary-Dulany James (D)	$836,048	$41,101	$79,617
Raj Goel (R)	$374,236	$247,425	$16,090
Source: Maryland State Board of Elections

==== Results ====
2026 Maryland Senate 34th District election
Party	Candidate	Votes	%	±%
Democratic	Mary-Dulany James (incumbent)	31,161	60.32%	+9.77%
Republican	Raj Goel	20,397	39.48%	−9.76%
Write-in		105	0.20%	-0.02%
Total votes		51,663	100.00%	

== District 35 ==
2026 Maryland Senate 35th District election
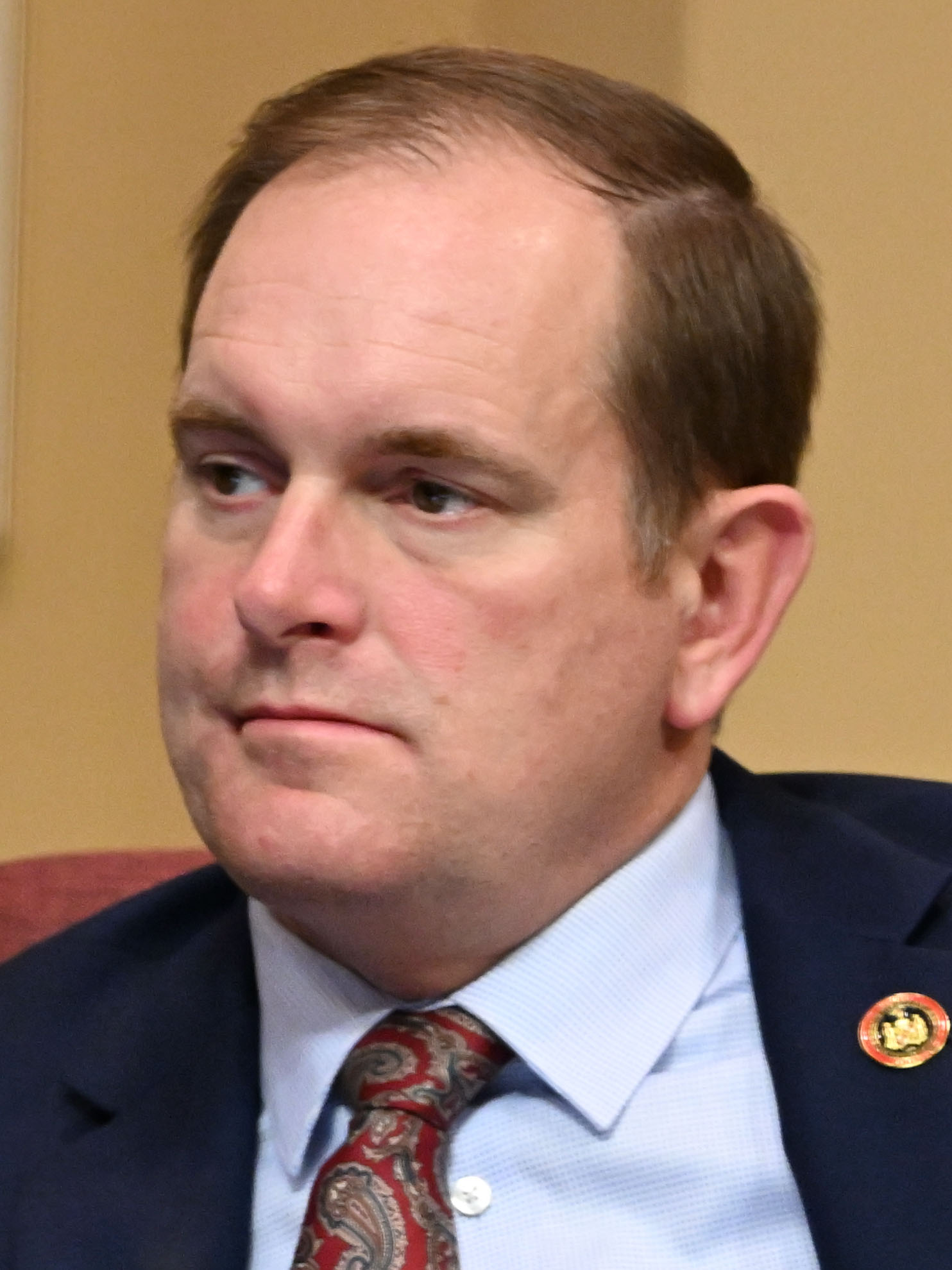

Candidate	Jason C. Gallion	Neil Jennings
Party	Republican	Democratic
Popular vote	37,412	19,046
Percentage	66.2%	33.7%
- Precinct results Gallion: 50–60% 60–70% 70–80% 80–90% Jennings: 50–60%
State Senator before election
Jason C. Gallion
Republican
Elected State Senator
Jason C. Gallion
Republican

The 35th district encompasses north Harford and Cecil counties, including Rising Sun, North East, and Castleton. Two-term Republican incumbent Jason C. Gallion won re-election to the seat with 96.9 percent of the vote in 2022.

=== Republican primary ===
==== Nominee ====
- Jason C. Gallion, incumbent state senator

==== Endorsements ====
Jason Gallion

Organizations

- Maryland Farm Bureau
- Maryland Right to Life

==== Fundraising ====
Campaign finance reports as of June 7, 2026
Candidate	Raised	Spent	Cash on hand
Jason Gallion (R)	$122,310	$79,246	$69,586
Source: Maryland State Board of Elections

==== Results ====
Republican primary results
Party	Candidate	Votes	%
Republican	Jason C. Gallion (incumbent)	12,636	100.00%
Total votes		12,636	100.00%

=== Democratic primary ===
==== Nominee ====
- Neil Jennings, U.S. Army veteran

==== Fundraising ====
Campaign finance reports as of June 7, 2026
Candidate	Raised	Spent	Cash on hand
Neil Jennings (D)	<$1,000	<$1,000	N/A
Source: Maryland State Board of Elections

==== Results ====
Democratic primary results
Party	Candidate	Votes	%
Democratic	Neil Jennings	4,783	100.00%
Total votes		4,783	100.00%

=== General election ===
==== Fundraising ====
Campaign finance reports as of November 10, 2026
Candidate	Raised	Spent	Cash on hand
Jason Gallion (R)	$145,560	$125,350	$46,732
Source: Maryland State Board of Elections

==== Results ====
2026 Maryland Senate 35th District election
Party	Candidate	Votes	%	±%
Republican	Jason C. Gallion (incumbent)	37,412	66.21%	−30.65%
Democratic	Neil Jennings	19,046	33.71%	N/A
Write-in		48	0.08%	-3.06%
Total votes		56,506	100.00%	

== District 36 ==
2026 Maryland Senate 36th District election
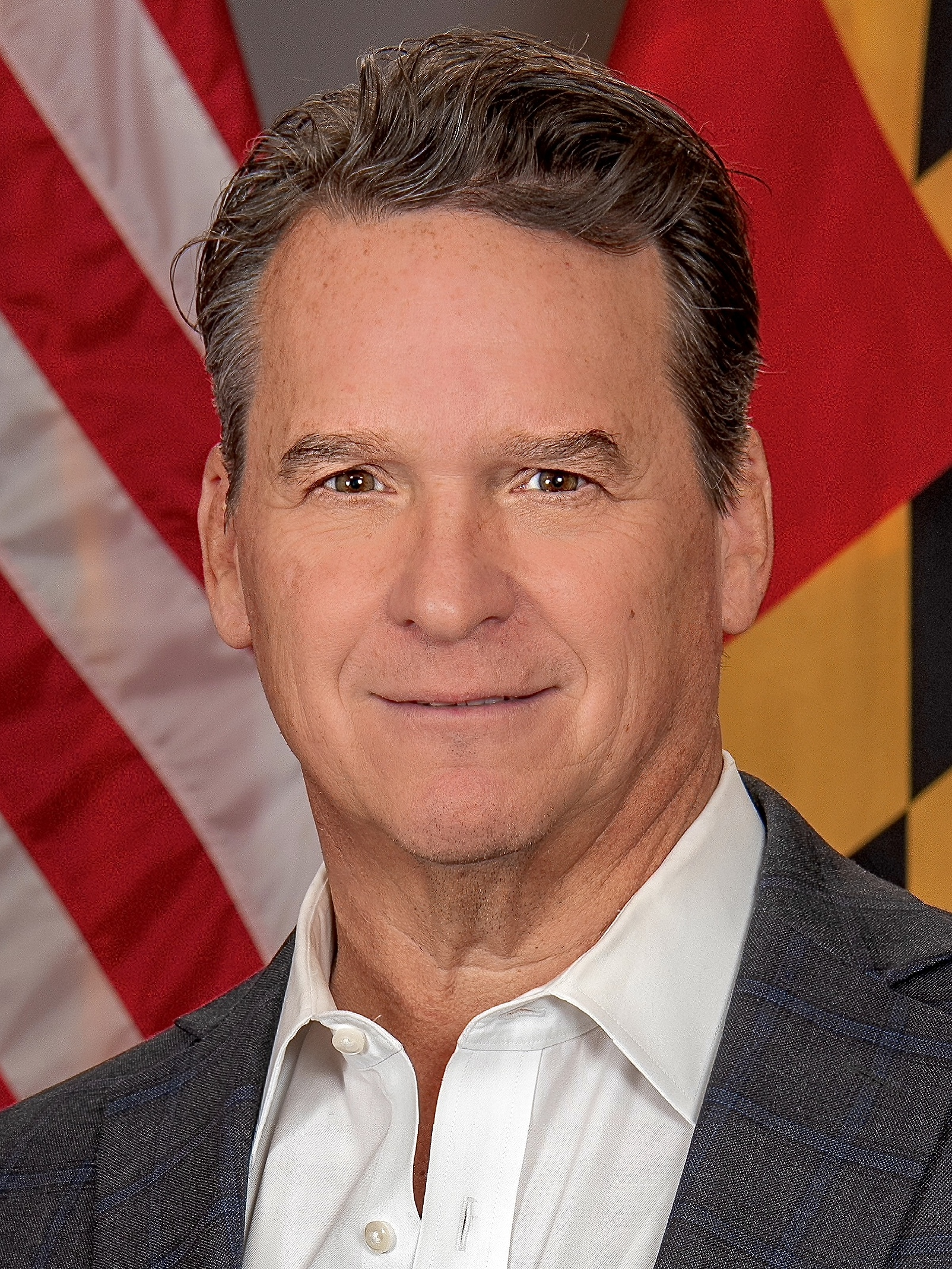

Candidate	Steve Hershey	Nivek Johnson
Party	Republican	Democratic
Popular vote	32,117	22,099
Percentage	59.2%	40.7%
- Precinct results Hershey: 50–60% 60–70% 70–80% Johnson: 50–60% 60–70%
State Senator before election
Steve Hershey
Republican
Elected State Senator
Steve Hershey
Republican

The 36th district encompasses all of Kent and Queen Anne's counties, and parts of Cecil and Caroline counties, including Elkton. Three-term Republican incumbent Steve Hershey won re-election to the seat with 96.3 percent of the vote in 2022.

=== Republican primary ===
==== Nominee ====
- Steve Hershey, incumbent state senator

==== Endorsements ====
Steve Hershey

Organizations

- Maryland Farm Bureau
- Maryland Right to Life

==== Fundraising ====
Campaign finance reports as of June 7, 2026
Candidate	Raised	Spent	Cash on hand
Steve Hershey (R)	$379,726	$245,723	$262,707
Source: Maryland State Board of Elections

==== Results ====
Republican primary results
Party	Candidate	Votes	%
Republican	Steve Hershey (incumbent)	8,100	100.00%
Total votes		8,100	100.00%

=== Democratic primary ===
==== Nominee ====
- Nivek Johnson, former member of the Kent County Board of Education (2018–2022)

==== Eliminated in primary ====
- John Queen, community organizer

==== Endorsements ====
Nivek Johnson

Organizations

- Moms Demand Action
John Queen

U.S. representatives

- Wayne Gilchrest, MD-01 (1991–2009) (formerly Republican)

==== Fundraising ====
Campaign finance reports as of June 7, 2026
Candidate	Raised	Spent	Cash on hand
Nivek Johnson (D)	$2,798	$1,503	$1,295
John Queen (D)	$5,886	$3,772	$2,114
Source: Maryland State Board of Elections

==== Results ====
Results by precinct Johnson: 50–60%; 60–70%; 70–80%; Queen: 50–60%; 60–70%

Democratic primary results
Party	Candidate	Votes	%
Democratic	Nivek Johnson	3,893	56.98%
Democratic	John Queen	2,939	43.02%
Total votes		6,832	100.00%

=== General election ===
==== Fundraising ====
Campaign finance reports as of November 10, 2026
Candidate	Raised	Spent	Cash on hand
Steve Hershey (R)	$484,776	$377,361	$236,119
Nivek Johnson (D)	$6,211	$2,993	$3,218
Source: Maryland State Board of Elections

==== Results ====
2026 Maryland Senate 36th District election
Party	Candidate	Votes	%	±%
Republican	Steve Hershey (incumbent)	32,117	59.20%	−37.08%
Democratic	Nivek Johnson	22,099	40.74%	N/A
Write-in		34	0.06%	-3.66%
Total votes		54,250	100.00%	

== District 37 ==
2026 Maryland Senate 37th District election
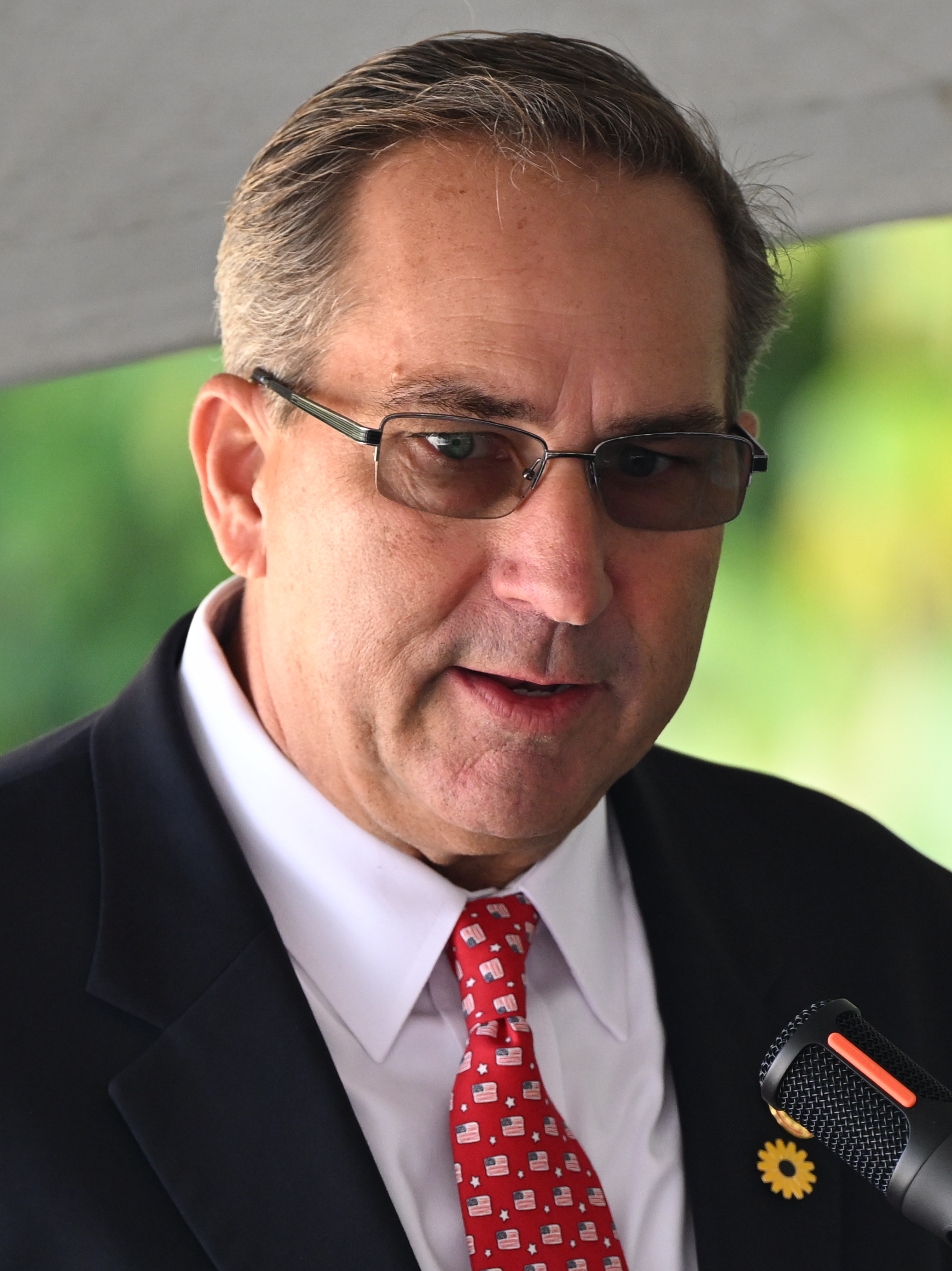

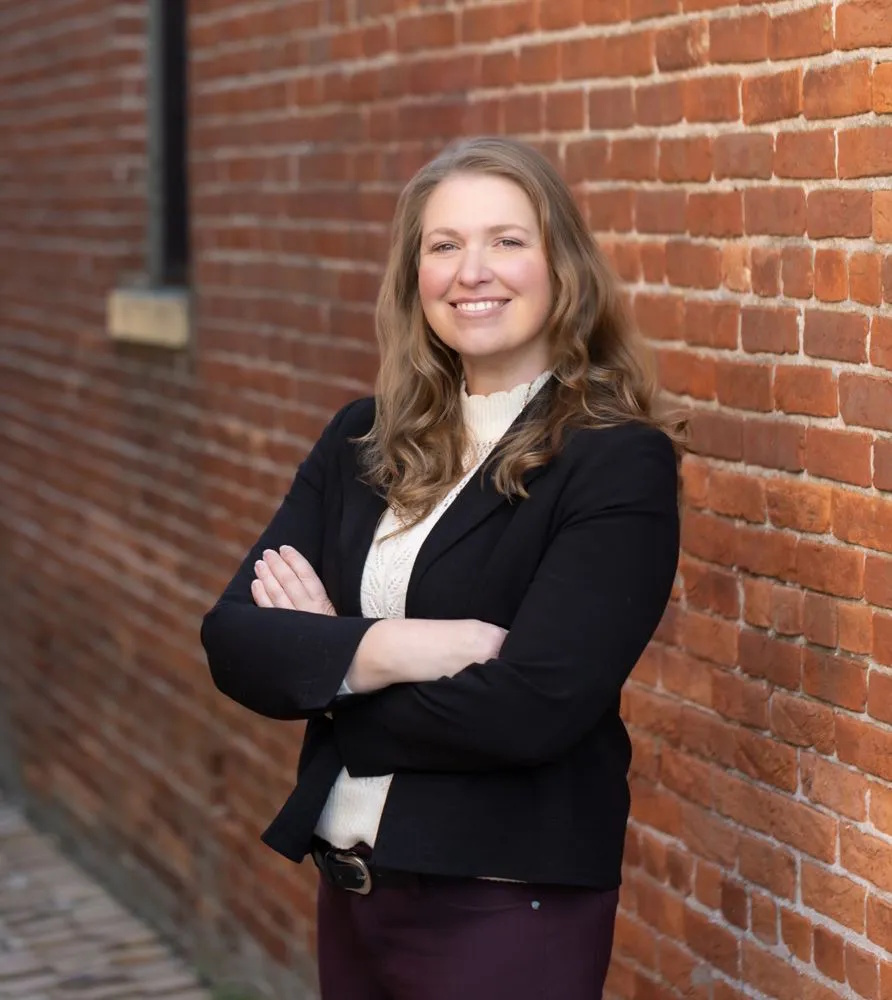
Candidate	Johnny Mautz	Katie Clendaniel
Party	Republican	Democratic
Popular vote	29,419	23,819
Percentage	55.2%	44.7%
- Precinct results Mautz: 50–60% 60–70% 70–80% 80–90% >90% Clendaniel: 50–60% 60–70% 70–80% 80–90% >90%
State Senator before election
Johnny Mautz
Republican
Elected State Senator
Johnny Mautz
Republican

The 37th district encompasses all of Talbot and Dorchester counties, and parts of Caroline and Wicomico counties, including Cambridge, Easton, Federalsburg, and parts of Salisbury. One-term Republican incumbent Johnny Mautz won election to the seat with 60.8 percent of the vote in 2022.

=== Republican primary ===
==== Nominee ====
- Johnny Mautz, incumbent state senator

==== Endorsements ====
Johnny Mautz

Organizations

- Maryland Farm Bureau
- Maryland Right to Life

==== Fundraising ====
Campaign finance reports as of June 7, 2026
Candidate	Raised	Spent	Cash on hand
Johnny Mautz (R)	$459,020	$263,425	$228,506
Source: Maryland State Board of Elections

==== Results ====
Republican primary results
Party	Candidate	Votes	%
**Republican**	**Johnny Mautz (incumbent)**	**9,626**	**100.00%**
Total votes		**9,626**	**100.00%**

=== Democratic primary ===
==== Nominee ====
- Katie Clendaniel, nonprofit executive

==== Eliminated in primary ====
- Edmund Barrett, U.S. Army veteran

==== Endorsements ====
Endorsements in bold were made after the primary elections.

Edmund Barrett

Statewide officials

- Brooke Lierman, Maryland Comptroller (2023–present)

Organizations

- Maryland National Organization for Women
Katie Clendaniel

Organizations

- **Maryland Sierra Club**
- Moms Demand Action

==== Fundraising ====
Campaign finance reports as of June 7, 2026
Candidate	Raised	Spent	Cash on hand
Edmund Barrett (D)	$11,817	$21,178	$761
Katie Clendaniel (D)	$18,430	$10,090	$10,314
Source: Maryland State Board of Elections

==== Results ====
Results by precinct Clendaniel: 50–60%; 60–70%; 70–80%; 80–90%; >90%; Barrett: 50–60%; 60–70%; 70–80%; >90%; Tie

Democratic primary results
Party	Candidate	Votes	%
**Democratic**	**Katie Clendaniel**	**6,287**	**71.69%**
Democratic	Edmund Barrett	2,483	28.31%
Total votes		**8,770**	**100.00%**

=== General election ===
==== Fundraising ====
Campaign finance reports as of November 10, 2026
Candidate	Raised	Spent	Cash on hand
Johnny Mautz (R)	$583,265	$609,101	$7,075
Katie Clendaniel (D)	$114,238	$111,671	$6,001
Source: Maryland State Board of Elections

==== Results ====
2026 Maryland Senate 37th District election
Party	Candidate	Votes	%	±%
**Republican**	**Johnny Mautz (incumbent)**	**29,419**	**55.24%**	**−5.56%**
Democratic	Katie Clendaniel	23,819	44.72%	+5.62%
Write-in		19	0.04%	-0.06%
Total votes		**53,257**	**100.00%**	

== District 38 ==
2026 Maryland Senate 38th District election
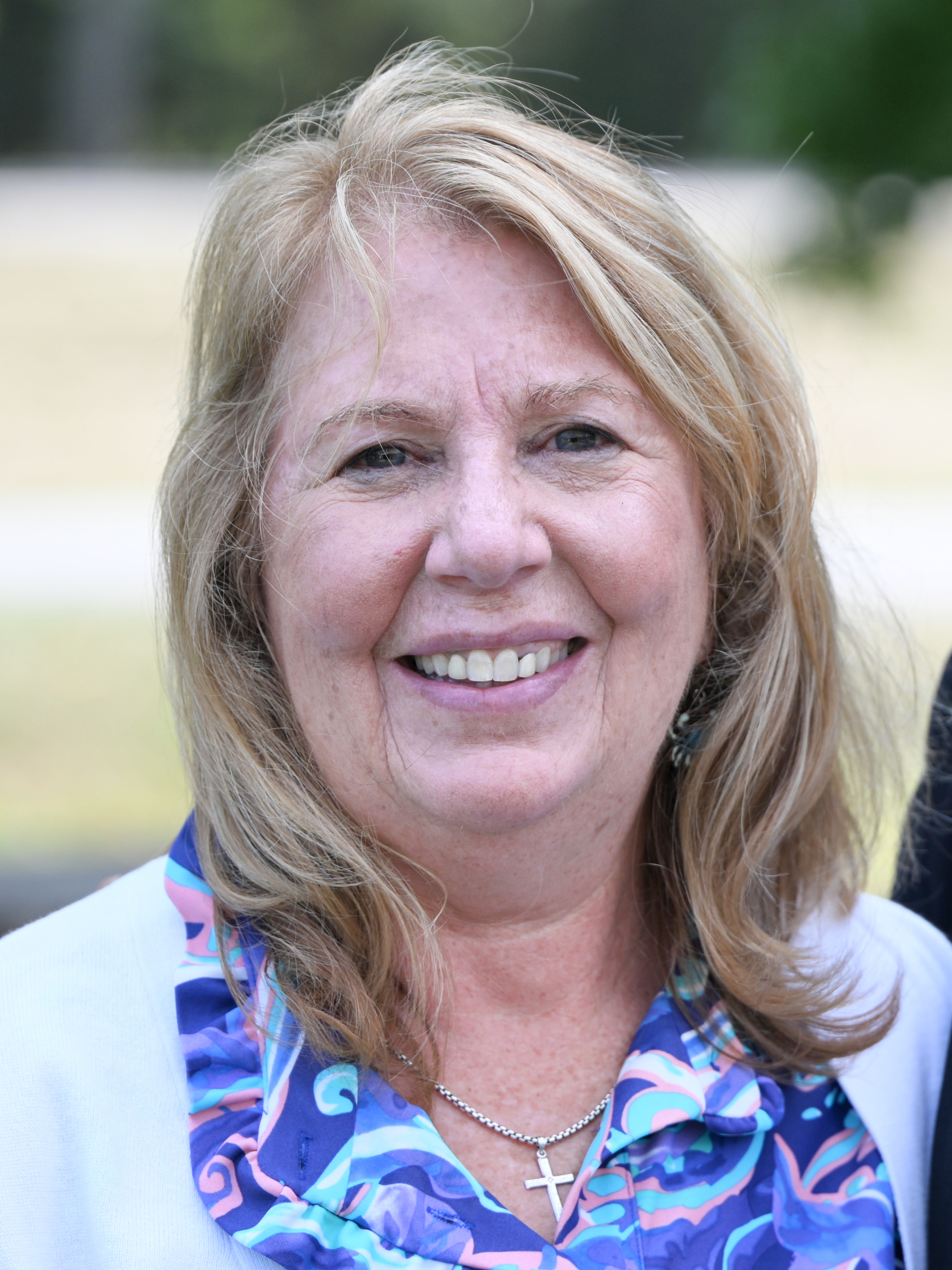

Candidate	Mary Beth Carozza	Lino Cressotti
Party	Republican	Democratic
Popular vote	31,748	20,067
Percentage	61.2%	38.7%
- Precinct results Carozza: 50–60% 60–70% 70–80% 80–90% >90% Cressotti: 50–60% 60–70% 70–80% 80–90%
State Senator before election
Mary Beth Carozza
Republican
Elected State Senator
Mary Beth Carozza
Republican

The 38th district encompasses all of Worcester and Somerset counties, and part of Wicomico County, including Ocean City, Pocomoke City, Princess Anne, and part of Salisbury. Two-term Republican incumbent Mary Beth Carozza won election to the seat with 66.4 percent of the vote in 2022.

=== Republican primary ===
==== Nominee ====
- Mary Beth Carozza, incumbent state senator

==== Endorsements ====
Endorsements in bold were made after the primary elections.

Mary Beth Carozza

Labor unions

- **Fraternal Order of Police Lodge 50**

Organizations

- Maryland Farm Bureau

==== Fundraising ====
Campaign finance reports as of June 7, 2026
Candidate	Raised	Spent	Cash on hand
Mary Beth Carozza (R)	$348,228	$201,651	$233,889
Source: Maryland State Board of Elections

==== Results ====
Republican primary results
Party	Candidate	Votes	%
**Republican**	**Mary Beth Carozza (incumbent)**	**10,121**	**100.00%**
Total votes		**10,121**	**100.00%**

=== Democratic primary ===
==== Nominee ====
- Lino Cressotti, former union leader

==== Endorsements ====
Endorsements in bold were made after the primary elections.

Lino Cressotti

Organizations

- **Moms Demand Action**

==== Fundraising ====
Campaign finance reports as of June 7, 2026
Candidate	Raised	Spent	Cash on hand
Lino Cressotti (D)	$19,848	$626	$19,222
Source: Maryland State Board of Elections

==== Results ====
Democratic primary results
Party	Candidate	Votes	%
**Democratic**	**Lino Cressotti**	**6,415**	**100.00%**
Total votes		**6,415**	**100.00%**

=== General election ===
==== Fundraising ====
Campaign finance reports as of November 10, 2026
Candidate	Raised	Spent	Cash on hand
Mary Beth Carozza (R)	$413,848	$349,852	$152,837
Lino Cressotti (D)	$52,216	$19,457	$32,759
Source: Maryland State Board of Elections

==== Results ====
2026 Maryland Senate 38th District election
Party	Candidate	Votes	%	±%
**Republican**	**Mary Beth Carozza (incumbent)**	**31,748**	**61.23%**	**−5.19%**
Democratic	Lino Cressotti	20,067	38.70%	+5.21%
Write-in		33	0.06%	-0.03%
Total votes		**51,848**	**100.00%**	

== District 39 ==
2026 Maryland Senate 39th District election
Candidate	Amar Mukunda
Party	Democratic
Popular vote	33,249
Percentage	96.9%
State Senator before election
Nancy J. King
Democratic
Elected State Senator
Amar Mukunda
Democratic

The 39th district includes Montgomery Village and parts of Germantown and Clarksburg. Four-term Democratic incumbent Nancy J. King won re-election to the seat with 86.2 percent of the vote in 2022.

=== Democratic primary ===
==== Nominee ====
- Amar Mukunda, U.S. Army reservist, gun control activist, and entrepreneur

==== Eliminated in primary ====
- Nancy J. King, incumbent state senator
- Destiny Drake West, think tank founder, former senior program specialist at the U.S. Department of Housing and Urban Development, and candidate for MD-06 in 2024

==== Endorsements ====
Endorsements in bold were made after the primary elections.

Nancy J. King

Statewide officials

- Brooke Lierman, Maryland Comptroller (2023–present)
- Wes Moore, Maryland governor (2023–present)

State legislators

- Lesley Lopez, state delegate from the 39th district (2019–present)
- W. Gregory Wims, state delegate from the 39th district (2023–present)

Labor unions

- Amalgamated Transit Union Local 689
- AFSCME Council 3
- IAFF Local 1664
- LIUNA Philadelphia/Baltimore/Washington Laborers' District Council
- Maryland State & DC AFL-CIO
- Maryland State Education Association
- Service Employees International Union Local 500
- United Food and Commercial Workers Local 1994 MCGEO

Organizations

- Maryland Farm Bureau
- Maryland National Organization for Women
- Moms Demand Action
Amar Mukunda

State legislators

- Gabriel Acevero, state delegate from the 39th district (2019–present)

Labor unions

- **Maryland State Education Association**
- **Service Employees International Union Local 500**

Organizations

- CASA in Action
- Chesapeake Climate Action Network
- Council on American–Islamic Relations Action
- Maryland League of Conservation Voters
- Maryland Sierra Club
- Moms Demand Action
- New American Leaders Action Fund
- Our Revolution
- Run for Something
- Third Act Maryland
Destiny Drake West

Organizations

- Moms Demand Action

==== Fundraising ====
Campaign finance reports as of June 7, 2026
Candidate	Raised	Spent	Cash on hand
Nancy King (D)	$249,676	$178,760	$197,040
Amar Mukunda (D)	$115,326	$74,137	$40,639
Destiny Drake West (D)	$31,365	$16,426	$3,002
Source: Maryland State Board of Elections

==== Results ====
Results by precinct Mukunda: 40–50%; 50–60%; 60–70%; 70–80%; King: 40–50%; 50–60%; Tie 40–50%

Democratic primary results
Party	Candidate	Votes	%
**Democratic**	**Amar Mukunda**	**5,817**	**48.86%**
Democratic	Nancy J. King (incumbent)	4,426	37.18%
Democratic	Destiny Drake West	1,662	13.96%
Total votes		**11,905**	**100.00%**

=== General election ===
==== Fundraising ====
Campaign finance reports as of November 10, 2026
Candidate	Raised	Spent	Cash on hand
Amar Mukunda (D)	$153,876	$152,810	$516
Source: Maryland State Board of Elections

==== Results ====
2026 Maryland Senate 39th District election
Party	Candidate	Votes	%	±%
**Democratic**	**Amar Mukunda**	**33,249**	**96.88%**	**+10.70%**
Write-in		1,071	3.12%	+1.56%
Total votes		**34,320**	**100.00%**	

== District 40 ==
2026 Maryland Senate 40th District election
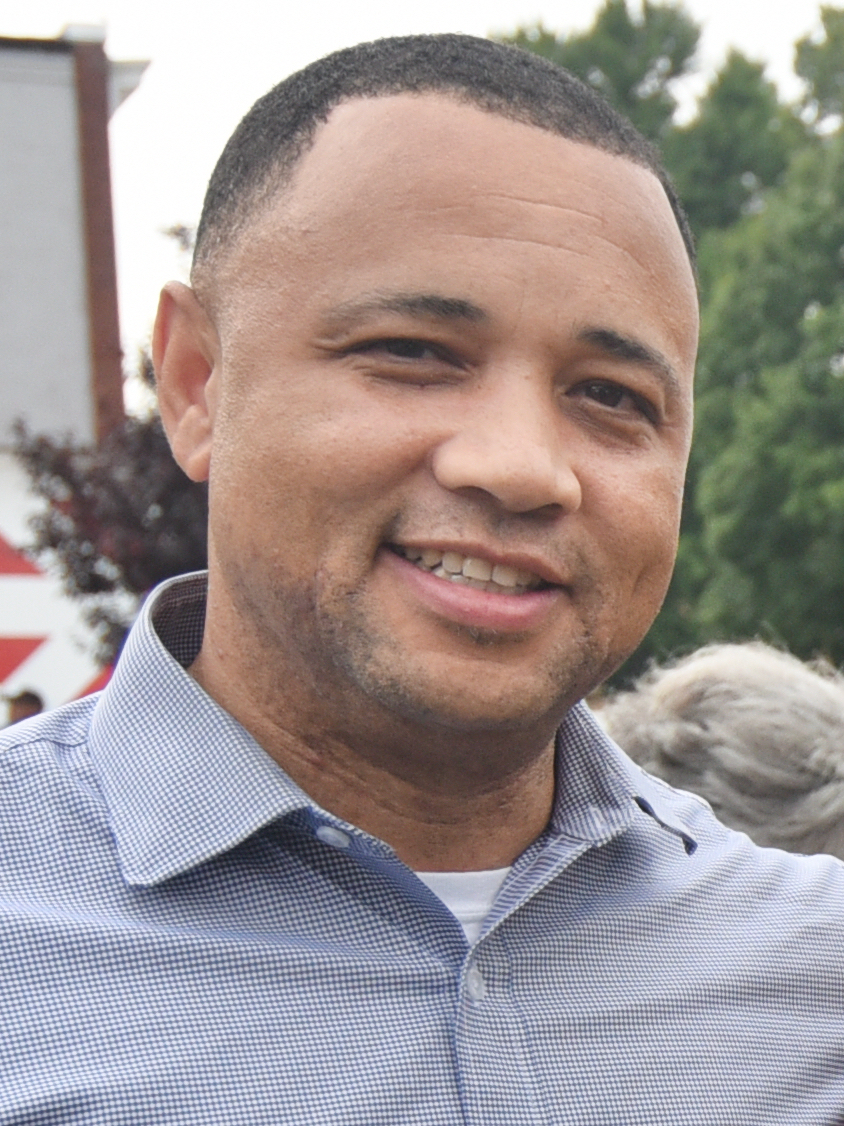

Candidate	Antonio Hayes	Alan Rebar
Party	Democratic	Working Class
Popular vote	27,661	3,284
Percentage	89.1%	10.6%
- Precinct results Hayes: 60–70% 70–80% 80–90% >90%
State Senator before election
Antonio Hayes
Democratic
Elected State Senator
Antonio Hayes
Democratic

The 40th district encompasses communities in west Baltimore, including Morrell Park, Sandtown-Winchester, and Greenspring. Two-term Democratic incumbent Antonio Hayes won re-election to the seat with 91.9 percent of the vote in 2022.

=== Democratic primary ===
==== Nominee ====
- Antonio Hayes, incumbent state senator

==== Eliminated in primary ====
- Steven Messmer, attorney

==== Withdrew ====
- Kevin Legacy (ran for state delegate)

==== Endorsements ====
Endorsements in bold were made after the primary elections.

Antonio Hayes

Statewide officials

- Wes Moore, Maryland governor (2023–present)

Labor unions

- AFSCME Council 3
- LIUNA Philadelphia/Baltimore/Washington Laborers' District Council
- Maryland State & DC AFL-CIO
- Service Employees International Union Local 500

Organizations

- Maryland Farm Bureau
- Maryland League of Conservation Voters
- **Maryland Sierra Club**

Newspapers

- Baltimore Afro-American
Steven Messmer

Organizations

- Maryland Forward Party

==== Fundraising ====
Campaign finance reports as of June 7, 2026
Candidate	Raised	Spent	Cash on hand
Antonio Hayes (D)	$681,396	$542,196	$196,873
Steven Messmer (D)	$1,438	$13	$1,337
Source: Maryland State Board of Elections

==== Results ====
Democratic primary results
Party	Candidate	Votes	%
**Democratic**	**Antonio Hayes (incumbent)**	**9,982**	**84.65%**
Democratic	Steven Messmer	1,810	15.35%
Total votes		**11,792**	**100.00%**

=== Independent and third-party candidates ===
==== Declared ====
- Alan Rebar, teacher (Working Class Party)

=== General election ===
==== Fundraising ====
Campaign finance reports as of November 10, 2026
Candidate	Raised	Spent	Cash on hand
Antonio Hayes (D)	$798,666	$782,856	$73,474
Source: Maryland State Board of Elections

==== Results ====
2026 Maryland Senate 40th District election
Party	Candidate	Votes	%	±%
**Democratic**	**Antonio Hayes (incumbent)**	**27,661**	**89.07%**	**−2.87%**
Working Class	Alan Rebar	3,284	10.58%	N/A
Write-in		110	0.35%	+0.10%
Total votes		**31,055**	**100.00%**	

== District 41 ==
2026 Maryland Senate 41st District election
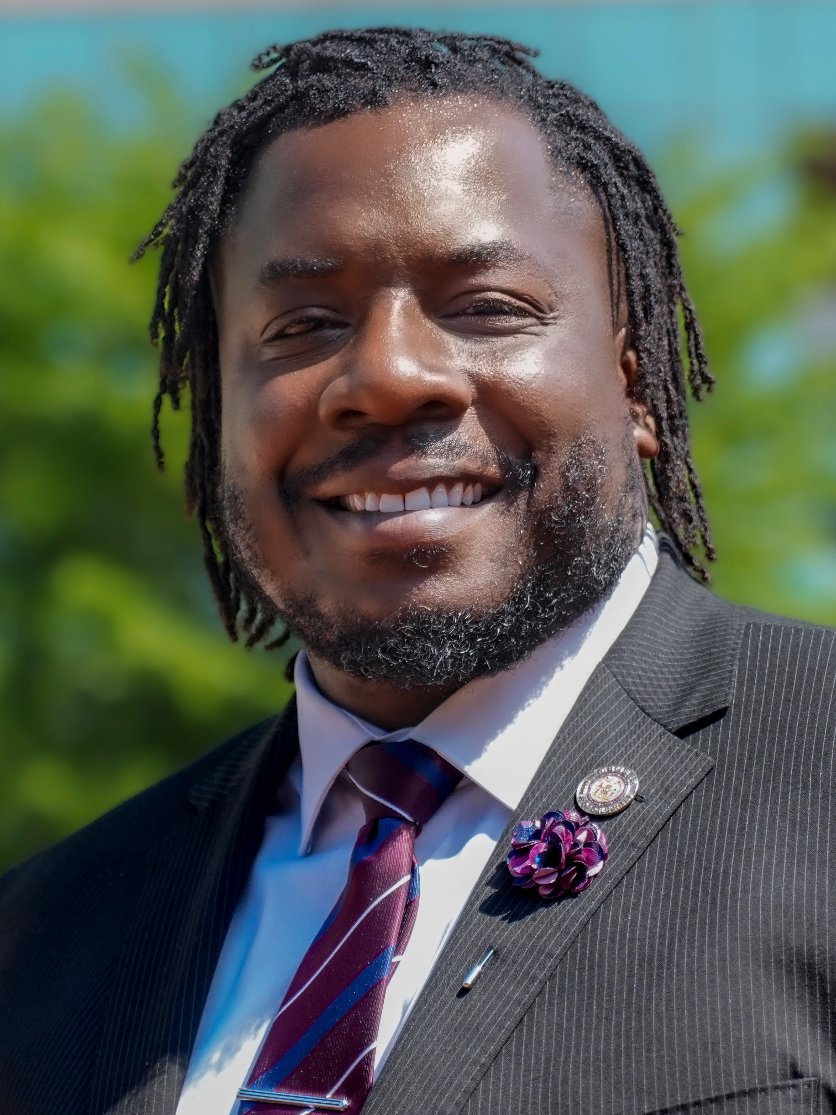
Candidate	Malcolm Ruff
Party	Democratic
Popular vote	35,113
Percentage	98.4%
State Senator before election
Dalya Attar
Democratic
Elected State Senator
Malcolm Ruff
Democratic

The 41st district encompasses communities in west Baltimore, including Wyndhurst, Yale Heights, and Edmondson. Two-term Democratic incumbent Jill P. Carter won re-election to the seat with 98.2 percent of the vote in 2022, but resigned in January 2025 after being nominated by Governor Wes Moore to the Maryland State Board of Contract Appeals. State delegate Dalya Attar was appointed to Carter's seat by Moore later that month.

The Democratic primary attracted significant media attention after Attar was indicted on federal extortion charges in October 2025. In June 2026, Attar sought permission to use confidential evidence from the ongoing federal case against her in her primary campaign, which was rejected by U.S. District Court Judge Stephanie A. Gallagher.

=== Democratic primary ===
==== Nominee ====
- Malcolm Ruff, state delegate from the 41st district (2023–present)

==== Eliminated in primary ====
- Dalya Attar, incumbent state senator

==== Disqualified ====
- Ayo Kimathi, Black nationalist and anti-LGBT activist

==== Endorsements ====
Dalya Attar

State legislators

- Samuel I. Rosenberg, state delegate from the 41st district (1983–present)
- Sean Stinnett, state delegate from the 41st district (2025–present)

Local officials

- ~~Ivan Bates, Baltimore State's Attorney (2022–present)~~

Labor unions

- Baltimore Fraternal Order of Police
Malcolm Ruff

U.S. representatives

- Kweisi Mfume, MD-07 (1987–1996, 2020–present)

Statewide officials

- Wes Moore, Maryland governor (2023–present)

State legislators

- Gabriel Acevero, state delegate from the 39th district (2019–present)
- Jill P. Carter, former state senator from the 41st district (2018–2025)
- Antonio Hayes, state senator from the 40th district (2019–present)
- Aletheia McCaskill, state delegate from district 44B (2023–present)
- N. Scott Phillips, state delegate from the 10th district (2023–present)

Local officials

- John Bullock, Baltimore city councilor from the 9th district (2016–present)
- Sharon Green Middleton, vice president of the Baltimore City Council (2016–present) from the 6th district (2007–present)
- Phylicia Porter, Baltimore city councilor from the 10th district (2020–present)
- Stephanie Rawlings-Blake, former mayor of Baltimore (2010–2016)
- Brandon Scott, mayor of Baltimore (2020–present)

Individuals

- Billy Murphy Jr., attorney
- Aaron Maybin, former NFL player

Labor unions

- 1199SEIU Maryland/DC
- AFSCME Council 3
- LIUNA Philadelphia/Baltimore/Washington Laborers' District Council
- Maryland State & DC AFL-CIO
- Service Employees International Union Local 500

Organizations

- Bikemore
- CASA in Action
- Charm City Indivisible
- Chesapeake Climate Action Network
- Council on American–Islamic Relations Action
- Maryland National Organization for Women
- Moms Demand Action

Newspapers

- Baltimore Afro-American
Declined to endorse

Local officials

- Ivan Bates, Baltimore State's Attorney (2022–present) (previously endorsed Attar)

==== Fundraising ====
Campaign finance reports as of June 7, 2026
Candidate	Raised	Spent	Cash on hand
Dalya Attar (D)	$255,922	$213,064	$47,422
Malcolm Ruff (D)	$569,910	$514,946	$54,964
Source: Maryland State Board of Elections

==== Results ====
Results by precinct Ruff: 50–60%; 60–70%; 70–80%; 80–90%; Attar: 50–60%; 60–70%; 70–80%; 80–90%; Tie

Democratic primary results
Party	Candidate	Votes	%
Democratic	Malcolm Ruff	11,594	60.14%
Democratic	Dalya Attar (incumbent)	7,681	39.86%
Total votes		19,278	100.00%

=== General election ===
==== Fundraising ====
Campaign finance reports as of November 10, 2026
Candidate	Raised	Spent	Cash on hand
Malcolm Ruff (D)	$756,710	$709,760	$46,949
Source: Maryland State Board of Elections

==== Results ====
2026 Maryland Senate 41st District election
Party	Candidate	Votes	%	±%
Democratic	Malcolm Ruff	35,113	98.43%	+0.23%
Write-in		561	1.57%	-0.23%
Total votes		35,674	100.00%	

== District 42 ==
2026 Maryland Senate 42nd District election
Candidate	Kevin Ford	Stephanie Popescu
Party	Republican	Democratic
Popular vote	29,667	25,942
Percentage	53.3%	46.6%
- Precinct results Ford: 50–60% 60–70% 70–80% Popescu: 50–60% 60–70% 70–80% 80–90%
State Senator before election
Chris West
Republican
Elected State Senator
Kevin Ford
Republican

The 42nd district encompasses north Baltimore County, including Timonium, Parkton, and Hereford. Two-term Republican incumbent Chris West won re-election to the seat with 95.5 percent of the vote in 2022, but opted against running for a third term in August 2023.

=== Republican primary ===
==== Nominee ====
- Kevin Ford, Baltimore County Fire Department lieutenant

==== Eliminated in primary ====
- Matt Fox, firefighter
- Adam Wood, former executive director of the Maryland Republican Party (2023–2026)

==== Withdrawn ====
- Nino Mangione, member of the Baltimore County Council from the 3rd district (2026–present) (running for Baltimore County Council, endorsed Ford)

==== Declined ====
- Chris West, incumbent state senator (endorsed Wood)

==== Endorsements ====
Endorsements in bold were made after the primary elections.

Kevin Ford

U.S. representatives

- Andy Harris, MD-01 (2011–present)

County officials

- Nino Mangione, member of the Baltimore County Council from the 3rd district (2026–present)

Organizations

- **Maryland Farm Bureau**
Matt Fox

County officials

- David Marks, member of the Baltimore County Council from the 5th district (2010–present)

Labor unions

- International Association of Fire Fighters Local 1311
Adam Wood

U.S. representatives

- Renee Ellmers, NC-02 (2011–2017)
- Keith Rothfus, PA-12 (2013–2019)

State legislators

- Justin Ready, state senator from the 5th district (2015–present)
- Chris Tomlinson, state delegate from the 5th district (2023–present)
- Chris West, state senator from the 42nd district (2019–present)

Organizations

- Maryland Right to Life

==== Fundraising ====
Campaign finance reports as of June 7, 2026
Candidate	Raised	Spent	Cash on hand
Kevin Ford (R)	$151,772	$123,465	$31,332
Matt Fox (R)	$14,035	$12,369	$1,666
Adam Wood (R)	$41,462	$32,140	$6,756
Source: Maryland State Board of Elections

==== Results ====
Results by precinct Ford: 30–40%; 40–50%; 50–60%; 60–70%; 70–80%; Wood: 60–70%; Fox: 40–50%; 50–60%

Republican primary results
Party	Candidate	Votes	%
**Republican**	**Kevin Ford**	**5,561**	**53.56%**
Republican	Adam Wood	2,431	23.42%
Republican	Matt Fox	2,390	23.02%
Total votes		**10,382**	**100.00%**

=== Democratic primary ===
==== Nominee ====
- Stephanie Popescu, teacher

==== Eliminated in primary ====
- Paul Henderson, teacher
- Paul Konka, UMGC professor and nominee for HD-42A in 2022

==== Withdrawn ====
- Eric Heyssel, teacher

==== Endorsements ====
Endorsements in bold were made after the primary elections.

Paul Henderson

Organizations

- Moms Demand Action
- Third Act Maryland
Paul Konka

Organizations

- Center for Freethought Equality PAC
- Maryland National Organization for Women
- Maryland Sierra Club
- Moms Demand Action
Stephanie Popescu

Labor unions

- **Maryland State Education Association**

==== Fundraising ====
Campaign finance reports as of June 7, 2026
Candidate	Raised	Spent	Cash on hand
Paul Henderson (D)	$1,635	$1,085	$2,050
Paul Konka (D)	$60,100	$3,542	$56,558
Stephanie Popescu (D)	$42,611	$32,427	$10,184
Source: Maryland State Board of Elections

==== Results ====
Results by precinct Popescu: 30–40%; 40–50%; 50–60%; 60–70%; 70–80%; Henderson: 40–50%

Democratic primary results
Party	Candidate	Votes	%
**Democratic**	**Stephanie Popescu**	**5,210**	**54.82%**
Democratic	Paul Henderson	2,478	26.07%
Democratic	Paul V. Konka	1,816	19.11%
Total votes		**9,504**	**100.00%**

=== General election ===
==== Fundraising ====
Campaign finance reports as of November 10, 2026
Candidate	Raised	Spent	Cash on hand
Kevin Ford (R)	$255,141	$230,798	$104
Stephanie Popescu (D)	$165,208	$129,063	$5,649
Source: Maryland State Board of Elections

==== Results ====
2026 Maryland Senate 42nd District election
Party	Candidate	Votes	%	±%
**Republican**	**Kevin Ford**	**29,667**	**53.30%**	**−42.21%**
Democratic	Stephanie Popescu	25,942	46.61%	N/A
Write-in		53	0.10%	-4.39%
Total votes		**55,662**	**100.00%**	

== District 43 ==
2026 Maryland Senate 43rd District election
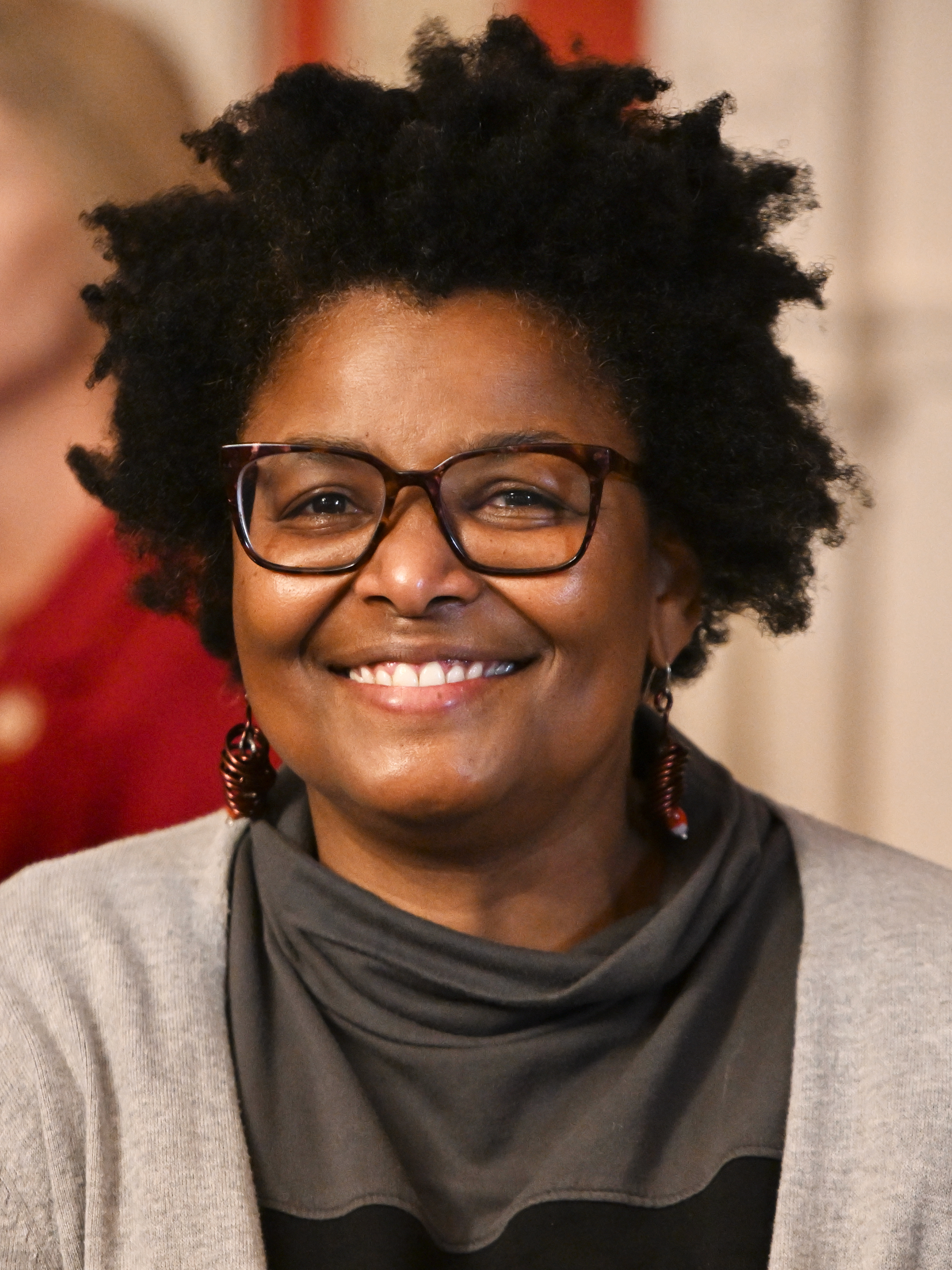
Candidate	Mary L. Washington
Party	Democratic
Popular vote	37,330
Percentage	98.8%
State Senator before election
Mary L. Washington
Democratic
Elected State Senator
Mary L. Washington
Democratic

The 43rd district encompasses parts of central Baltimore County and Baltimore, including Towson, Waverly, and Cameron Village. Two-term Democratic incumbent Mary L. Washington won re-election to the seat with 90.3 percent of the vote in 2022.

=== Democratic primary ===
==== Nominee ====
- Mary L. Washington, incumbent state senator

==== Endorsements ====
Mary Washington

Statewide officials

- Wes Moore, Maryland governor (2023–present)

Labor unions

- AFSCME Council 3
- LIUNA Philadelphia/Baltimore/Washington Laborers' District Council
- Service Employees International Union and Local 500

Organizations

- CASA in Action
- Maryland Sierra Club

Newspapers

- Baltimore Afro-American

==== Fundraising ====
Campaign finance reports as of June 7, 2026
Candidate	Raised	Spent	Cash on hand
Mary Washington (D)	$149,476	$141,818	$30,093
Source: Maryland State Board of Elections

==== Results ====
Democratic primary results
Party	Candidate	Votes	%
Democratic	Mary L. Washington (incumbent)	14,505	100.00%
Total votes		14,505	100.00%

=== General election ===
==== Fundraising ====
Campaign finance reports as of November 10, 2026
Candidate	Raised	Spent	Cash on hand
Mary Washington (D)	$152,826	$174,026	$1,236
Source: Maryland State Board of Elections

==== Results ====
2026 Maryland Senate 43rd District election
Party	Candidate	Votes	%	±%
Democratic	Mary L. Washington (incumbent)	37,330	98.79%	+8.48%
Write-in		457	1.21%	+0.85%
Total votes		37,787	100.00%	

== District 44 ==
2026 Maryland Senate 44th District election
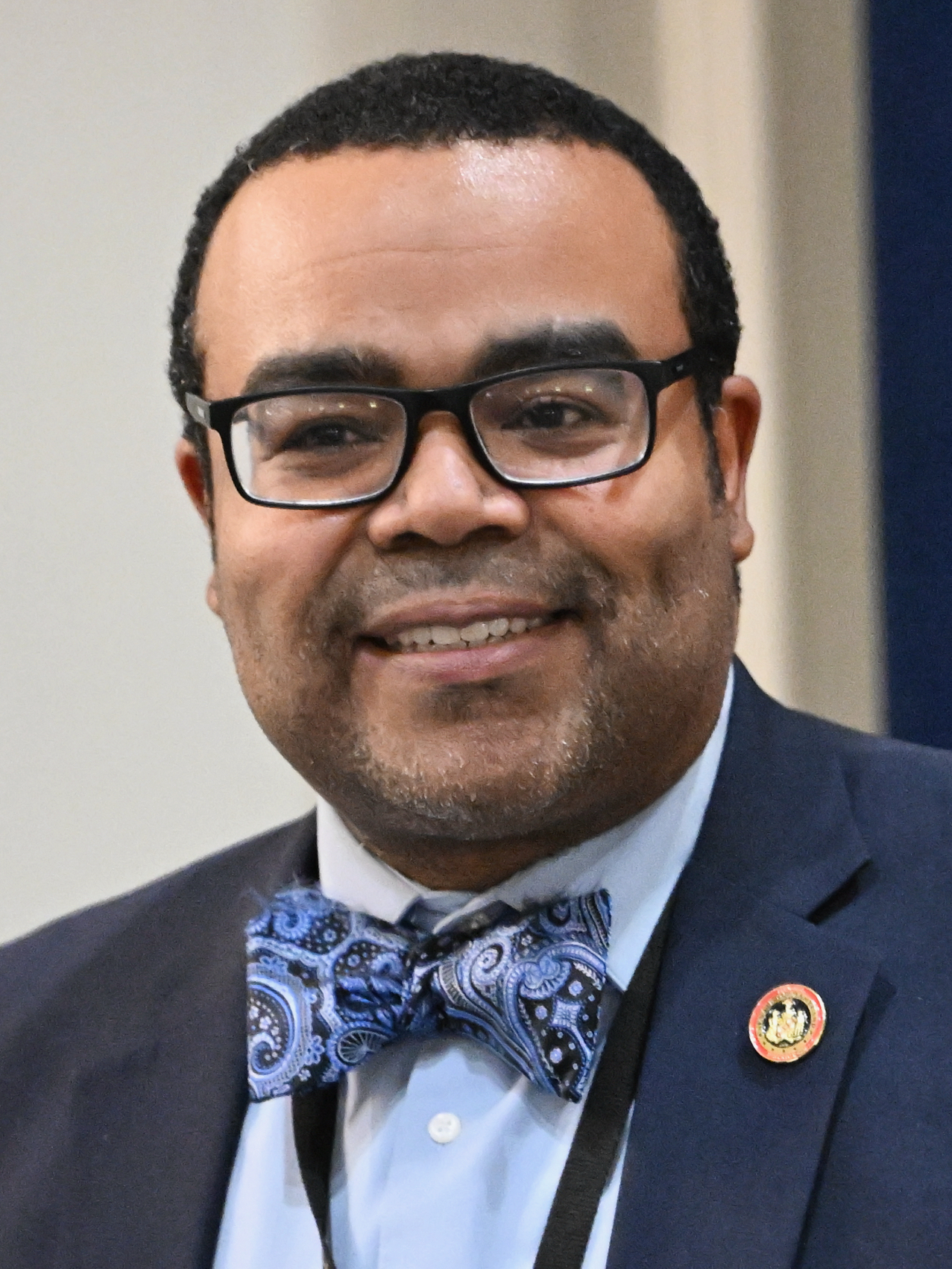
Candidate	Charles E. Sydnor III
Party	Democratic
Popular vote	36,505
Percentage	97.6%
State Senator before election
Charles E. Sydnor III
Democratic
Elected State Senator
Charles E. Sydnor III
Democratic

The 44th district encompasses parts of southwest Baltimore County surrounding Baltimore, including Woodlawn, Catonsville, and Landsowne. One-term Democratic incumbent Charles E. Sydnor III won election to the seat with 97.5 percent of the vote in 2022.

=== Democratic primary ===
==== Nominee ====
- Charles E. Sydnor III, incumbent state senator

==== Endorsements ====
Charles E. Sydnor III

Statewide officials

- Wes Moore, Maryland governor (2023–present)

Labor unions

- AFSCME Council 3
- LIUNA Philadelphia/Baltimore/Washington Laborers' District Council
- Maryland State & DC AFL-CIO
- Maryland State Education Association
- Service Employees International Union Local 500

Organizations

- CASA in Action
- Council on American–Islamic Relations Action
- Maryland League of Conservation Voters
- Maryland National Organization for Women
- Maryland Sierra Club
- Moms Demand Action

Newspapers

- Baltimore Afro-American

==== Fundraising ====
Campaign finance reports as of June 7, 2026
Candidate	Raised	Spent	Cash on hand
Charles Sydnor (D)	$201,455	$128,201	$101,240
Source: Maryland State Board of Elections

==== Results ====
Democratic primary results
Party	Candidate	Votes	%
Democratic	Charles E. Sydnor III (incumbent)	14,321	100.00%
Total votes		14,321	100.00%

=== General election ===
==== Fundraising ====
Campaign finance reports as of November 10, 2026
Candidate	Raised	Spent	Cash on hand
Charles Sydnor (D)	$233,680	$181,280	$79,450
Source: Maryland State Board of Elections

==== Results ====
2026 Maryland Senate 44th District election
Party	Candidate	Votes	%	±%
Democratic	Charles E. Sydnor III (incumbent)	36,505	97.59%	+0.11%
Write-in		903	2.41%	-0.11%
Total votes		37,408	100.00%	

== District 45 ==
2026 Maryland Senate 45th District election
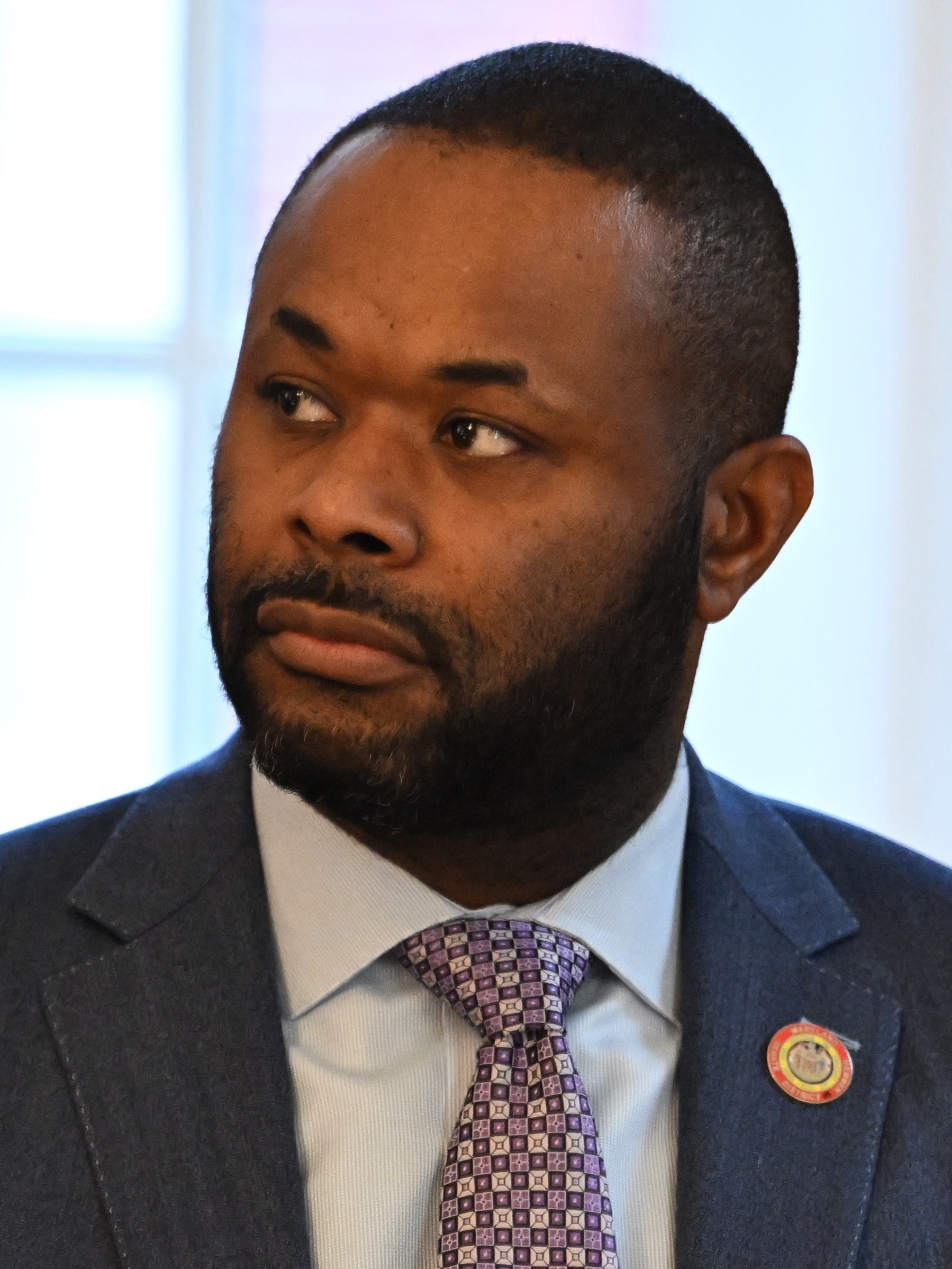
Candidate	Cory McCray
Party	Democratic
Popular vote	31,905
Percentage	99.0%
State Senator before election
Cory McCray
Democratic
Elected State Senator
Cory McCray
Democratic

The 45th district encompasses neighborhoods in central and east Baltimore, including Broadway East, Frankford, and Armistead Gardens. Two-term Democratic incumbent Cory McCray won election to the seat with 98.8 percent of the vote in 2022.

=== Democratic primary ===
==== Nominee ====
- Cory McCray, incumbent state senator

==== Endorsements ====
Cory McCray

Statewide officials

- Wes Moore, Maryland governor (2023–present)

Labor unions

- AFSCME Council 3
- LIUNA Philadelphia/Baltimore/Washington Laborers' District Council
- Maryland State & DC AFL-CIO
- Service Employees International Union Local 500

Organizations

- Bikemore
- Maryland Farm Bureau
- Maryland League of Conservation Voters
- Maryland Sierra Club

Newspapers

- Baltimore Afro-American

==== Fundraising ====
Campaign finance reports as of June 7, 2026
Candidate	Raised	Spent	Cash on hand
Cory McCray (D)	$556,433	$333,654	$334,033
Source: Maryland State Board of Elections

==== Results ====
Democratic primary results
Party	Candidate	Votes	%
Democratic	Cory McCray (incumbent)	11,234	100.00%
Total votes		11,234	100.00%

=== General election ===
==== Fundraising ====
Campaign finance reports as of November 10, 2026
Candidate	Raised	Spent	Cash on hand
Cory McCray (D)	$651,955	$445,748	$317,461
Source: Maryland State Board of Elections

==== Results ====
2026 Maryland Senate 45th District election
Party	Candidate	Votes	%	±%
Democratic	Cory McCray (incumbent)	31,912	99.04%	+0.24%
Write-in		310	0.96%	-0.24%
Total votes		32,222	100.00%	

== District 46 ==
2026 Maryland Senate 46th District election
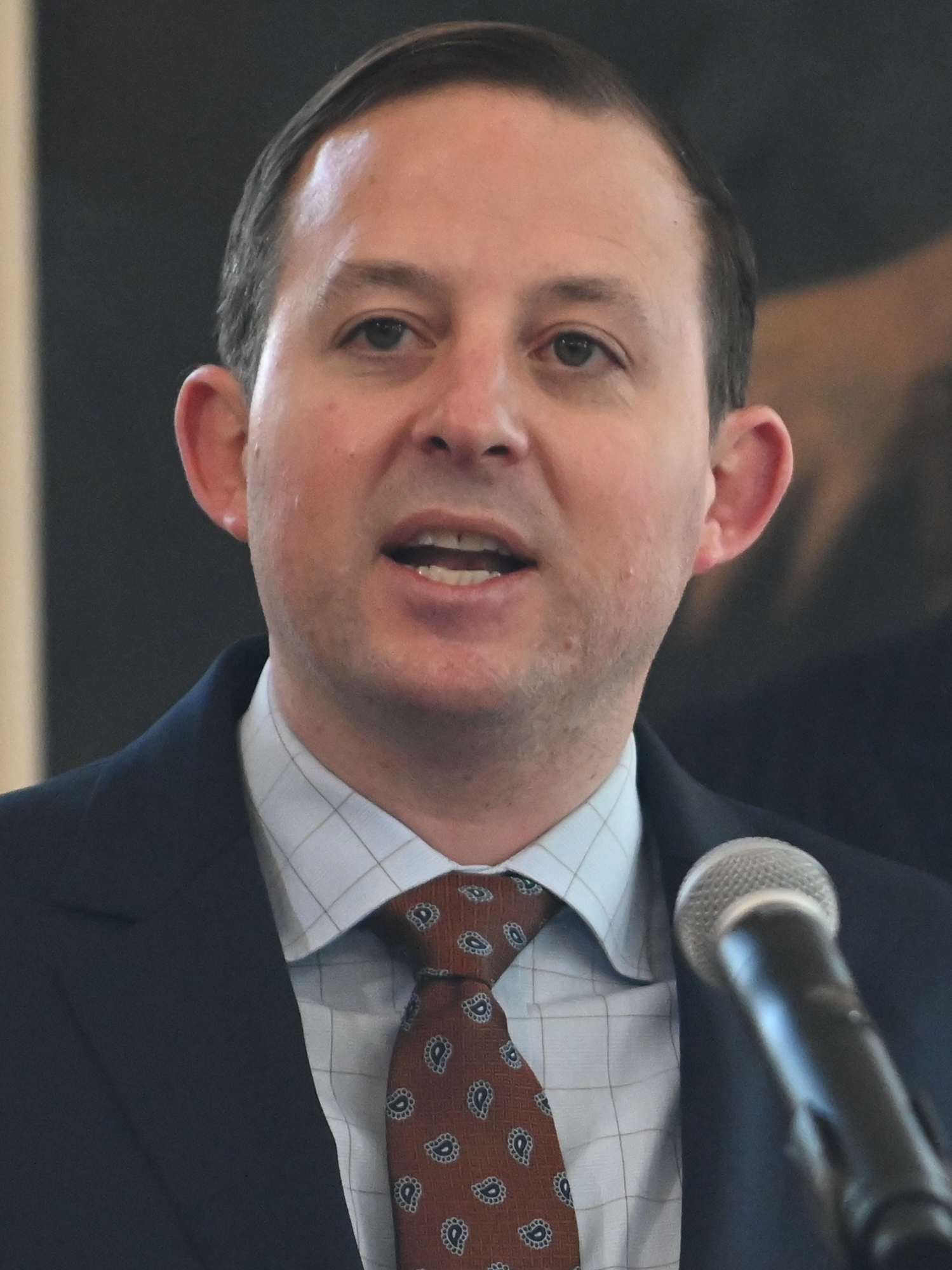

Candidate	Bill Ferguson	Emmanuel Digman
Party	Democratic	Republican
Popular vote	30,467	4,065
Percentage	87.7%	11.7%
- Precinct results Ferguson: 50–60% 60–70% 70–80% 80–90% >90%
State Senator before election
Bill Ferguson
Democratic
Elected State Senator
Bill Ferguson
Democratic

The 46th district encompasses neighborhoods in central and south Baltimore, including the Inner Harbor, Bayview, and Curtis Bay. Four-term Democratic incumbent and President of the Maryland Senate Bill Ferguson won election to the seat with 84.6 percent of the vote in 2022.

The Democratic primary election attracted significant media attention following the 2026 legislative session, during which Ferguson blocked efforts by Governor Wes Moore to redraw Maryland's congressional districts to improve the Democratic Party's chances of winning Maryland's 1st congressional district, the only one represented by a Republican. Ferguson had expressed concerns that redrawing the state's congressional districts could result in courts drawing a new map that allows Republicans to gain extra seats and compared mid-cycle redistricting to racial gerrymandering by diluting the Black vote by spreading voters across districts. In May 2026, The Baltimore Banner reported that Moore and Ferguson had a mutual agreement to endorse each other's re-election bids, but the agreement fell apart after Moore perceived Ferguson as not being more open to redrawing Maryland's maps following the U.S. Supreme Court's decision in Louisiana v. Callais. Since then, Ferguson has endorsed plans to call a special session following the primary elections to draft a ballot initiative to remove redistricting guidelines from the Constitution of Maryland, which could allow for mid-decade redistricting for the 2028 elections.

Ferguson won the Democratic primary election on June 23, 2026, defeating LaPin with 56.8 percent of the vote. Precinct-level data shows that Ferguson did best in predominantly Black or historically low-income neighborhoods south of the Inner Harbor—such as Cherry Hill, Westport, and Lakeland—while LaPin did best in many of the precincts with larger shares of younger, white and college-educated residents, including in Canton, Upper Fells Point, and Port Covington.

=== Democratic primary ===
==== Nominee ====
- Bill Ferguson, incumbent state senator

==== Eliminated in primary ====
- Bobby LaPin, businessman, social media influencer, and candidate for HD-35B in 2006 and HD-40 in 2014

==== Endorsements ====
Bill Ferguson

U.S. senators

- Angela Alsobrooks, U.S. senator from Maryland (2025–present)
- Chris Van Hollen, U.S. senator from Maryland (2017–present)

U.S. representatives

- Sarah Elfreth, MD-03 (2025–present)
- Kweisi Mfume, MD-07 (1987–1996; 2020–present)

Statewide officials

- Anthony Brown, Maryland Attorney General (2023–present)
- Brooke Lierman, Maryland Comptroller (2023–present)

State legislators

- Luke Clippinger, state delegate from the 46th district (2011–present)
- Mark Edelson, state delegate from the 46th district (2023–present)
- Robbyn Lewis, state delegate from the 46th district (2017–present)

Local officials

- Zeke Cohen, president of the Baltimore City Council (2024–present)
- Brandon Scott, mayor of Baltimore (2020–present)

Labor unions

- AFSCME Council 3
- LIUNA Philadelphia/Baltimore/Washington Laborers' District Council
- Maryland State & DC AFL-CIO
- Maryland State Education Association
- Service Employees International Union Local 500
- SMART

Organizations

- CASA in Action
- Humane World Action Fund
- Maryland Farm Bureau
- Maryland League of Conservation Voters
- Maryland Sierra Club
- Moms Demand Action

Newspapers

- Baltimore Afro-American
Bobby LaPin

Organizations

- Animal Wellness Action
- Charm City Indivisible
- Maryland National Organization for Women
- Third Act Maryland
Declined to endorse

Statewide officials

- Wes Moore, Maryland governor (2023–present)

==== Fundraising ====
Campaign finance reports as of June 7, 2026
Candidate	Raised	Spent	Cash on hand
Bill Ferguson (D)	$2,193,181	$1,442,662	$905,937
Bobby LaPin (D)	$187,822	$157,713	$29,909
Source: Maryland State Board of Elections

==== Polling ====
Poll source	Date(s) administered	Sample size (Note: Key: A – all adults RV – registered voters LV – likely voters V – unclear)	Margin of error	Bill Ferguson	Bobby LaPin	Undecided
Patinkin Research Strategies (Note: Poll sponsored by Ferguson's campaign.)	May 30 – June 2, 2026	300 (LV)	± 5.7%	53%	28%	19%
Workbench Strategies (Note: Poll sponsored by LaPin's campaign.)	June 2026	– (LV)	–	61%	32%	7%
Patinkin Research Strategies	May 11–14, 2026	300 (LV)	± 5.7%	48%	27%	25%
Patinkin Research Strategies	February 25 – March 1, 2026	300 (LV)	± 5.7%	50%	27%	23%

==== Results ====
Results by precinct Ferguson: 50–60%; 60–70%; 70–80%; 80–90%; LaPin: 50–60%; 70–80%; Tie

Democratic primary results
Party	Candidate	Votes	%
Democratic	Bill Ferguson (incumbent)	7,244	56.78%
Democratic	Bobby LaPin	5,514	43.22%
Total votes		12,758	100.00%

=== Republican primary ===
==== Nominee ====
- Emmanuel Digman, perennial candidate

==== Endorsements ====
Emmanuel Digman

Organizations

- Maryland Right to Life

==== Fundraising ====
Campaign finance reports as of June 7, 2026
Candidate	Raised	Spent	Cash on hand
Emmanuel Digman (R)	$582	$1,184	$117
Source: Maryland State Board of Elections

==== Results ====
Republican primary results
Party	Candidate	Votes	%
Republican	Emmanuel Digman	522	100.00%
Total votes		522	100.00%

=== General election ===
==== Fundraising ====
Campaign finance reports as of November 10, 2026
Candidate	Raised	Spent	Cash on hand
Bill Ferguson (D)	$2,563,698	$2,572,264	$142,535
Emmaunel Digman (R)	$593	$1,815	$122
Source: Maryland State Board of Elections

==== Results ====
2026 Maryland Senate 46th District election
Party	Candidate	Votes	%	±%
Democratic	Bill Ferguson (incumbent)	30,475	87.67%	+3.04%
Republican	Emmanuel Digman	4,065	11.69%	−3.51%
Write-in		222	0.64%	+0.47%
Total votes		34,762	100.00%	

== District 47 ==
2026 Maryland Senate 47th District election
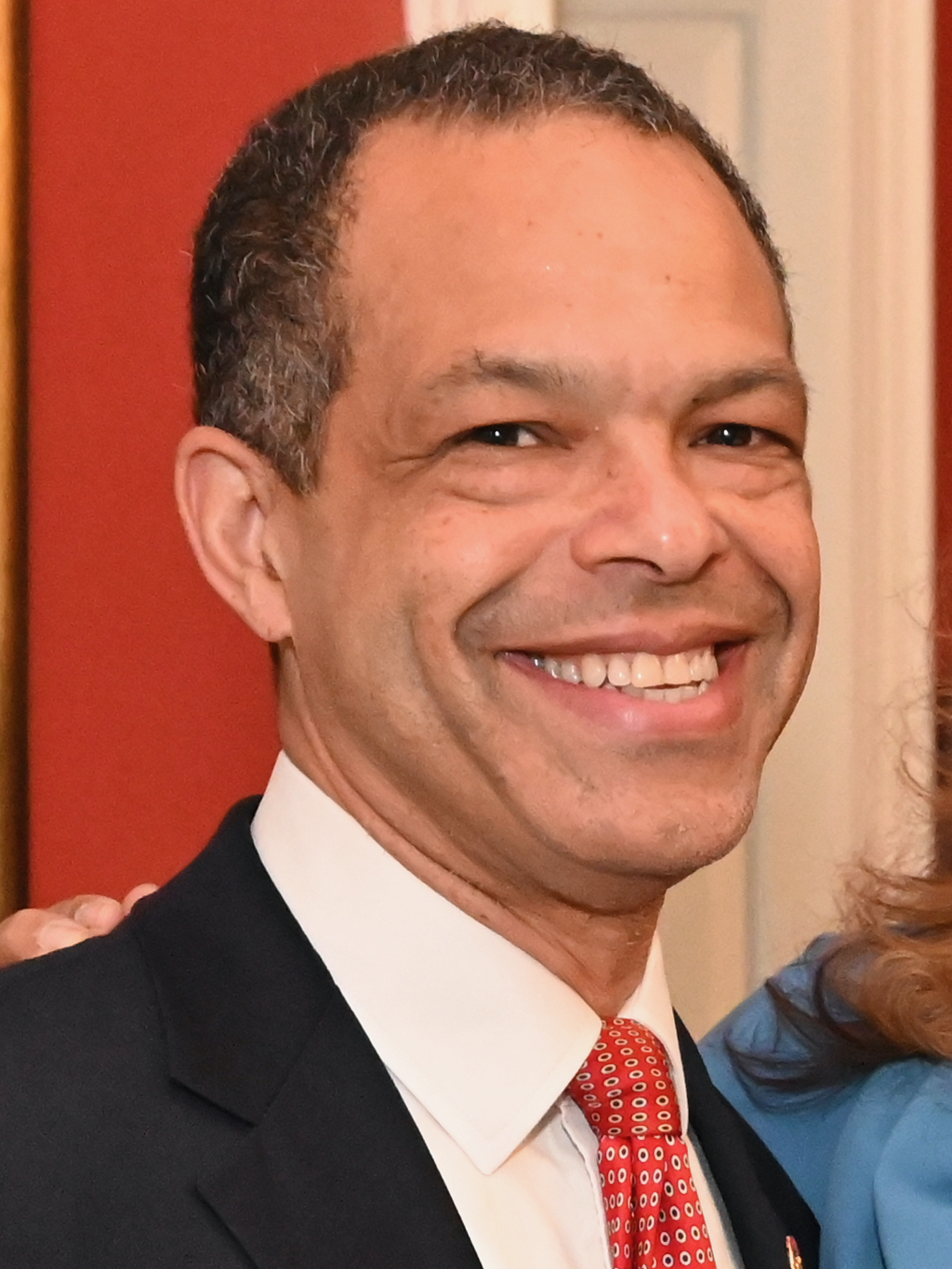
Candidate	Malcolm Augustine
Party	Democratic
State Senator before election
Malcolm Augustine
Democratic
Elected State Senator
Malcolm Augustine
Democratic

The 47th district encompasses parts of Prince George's County, including Chillum, Cheverly, and Landover. Two-term Democratic incumbent Malcolm Augustine won election to the seat with 98.8 percent of the vote in 2022.

=== Democratic primary ===
==== Nominee ====
- Malcolm Augustine, incumbent state senator

==== Endorsements ====
Malcolm Augustine

Statewide officials

- Wes Moore, Maryland governor (2023–present)

Labor unions

- Amalgamated Transit Union Local 689
- AFSCME Council 3
- LIUNA Philadelphia/Baltimore/Washington Laborers' District Council
- Service Employees International Union Local 500
- United Food and Commercial Workers Local 1994 MCGEO

Organizations

- Maryland League of Conservation Voters
- Maryland Sierra Club

Newspapers

- Baltimore Afro-American

==== Fundraising ====
Campaign finance reports as of June 7, 2026
Candidate	Raised	Spent	Cash on hand
Malcolm Augustine (D)	$362,179	$193,600	$222,739
Source: Maryland State Board of Elections

==== Results ====
Democratic primary results
Party	Candidate	Votes	%
Democratic	Malcolm Augustine (incumbent)	7,721	100.00%
Total votes		7,721	100.00%

=== General election ===
==== Fundraising ====
Campaign finance reports as of November 10, 2026
Candidate	Raised	Spent	Cash on hand
Malcolm Augustine (D)	$370,846	$369,848	$55,157
Source: Maryland State Board of Elections

==== Results ====
2026 Maryland Senate 47th District election
Party	Candidate	Votes	%	±%
Democratic	Malcolm Augustine (incumbent)			
Write-in				
Total votes				

== Notes ==
Partisan clients
