= Angela Gibson =

American politician from Maryland

Member of the Maryland House of Delegates from the 41 district
- In office February 24, 2017 – January 9, 2019
- Appointed by: Larry Hogan
- Preceded by: Nathaniel T. Oaks
- Succeeded by: Tony Bridges

Personal details
- Born: March 21, 1949 (age 77) Baltimore, Maryland
- Party: Democratic
- Education: Eastern High School
- Alma mater: Morgan State University (BS)

Angela Celestine Gibson (born March 21, 1949) is an American politician who was a Democratic member of the Maryland House of Delegates from District 41 from 2017 to 2019. Gibson was appointed to the House on February 24, 2017, to replace Nathaniel T. Oaks, who resigned upon appointment to State Senate.

== Background ==
Gibson was born in Baltimore, where she graduated from Eastern High School. She later attended Morgan State University, where she earned a Bachelor of Science degree. She is the president of the Epsilon Omega chapter of the Alpha Kappa Alpha sorority.

Gibson first got involved in politics in 1987, working as a spokeswoman for the Mayor of Baltimore until 2017. In 2006, she became a member of the Baltimore City Democratic Central Committee.

== In the legislature ==
In February 2017, following the appointment of state delegate Nathaniel Oaks to the Maryland Senate, Gibson applied to fill the vacancy left by his resignation from the Maryland House of Delegates. Fellow members of the Baltimore City Democratic Central Committee voted to nominate Gibson to succeed Oaks. On February 24, 2017, Governor Larry Hogan appointed Gibson to the Maryland House of Delegates. She was sworn in later that day, and served as a member of the Judiciary Committee. Gibson remained the chairwoman of the Baltimore City Democratic Central Committee during her tenure in the House of Delegates.

Gibson sought re-election in 2018, during which she ran on a ticket with state delegate Samuel I. Rosenberg. She was defeated in the Democratic primary on June 26, 2018, placing fourth with 11.7 percent of the vote.

Following her defeat in the Democratic primary, Gibson continued to serve as a member on the Baltimore City Democratic Central Committee. In May 2023, following the appointment of state delegate Tony Bridges as the Assistant Secretary for the Maryland Department of Transportation, Gibson applied to fill the vacancy left by his resignation in the Maryland House of Delegates. In June 2023, the Baltimore City Democratic Central Committee voted to send Governor Wes Moore the names of both Gibson and civil rights attorney Malcolm Ruff for consideration to fill the vacancy. On June 18, 2023, Moore appointed Ruff to fill the vacancy.

== Electoral history ==
Maryland House of Delegates District 41 Democratic primary election, 2018
Party	Candidate	Votes	%
Democratic	Samuel I. Rosenberg (incumbent)	7,795	17.2
Democratic	Dalya Attar	7,773	17.1
Democratic	Tony Bridges	5,476	12.1
Democratic	Angela C. Gibson (incumbent)	5,308	11.7
Democratic	Bilal Ali (incumbent)	5,194	11.4
Democratic	Richard Bruno	2,996	6.6
Democratic	Tessa Hill-Aston	2,862	6.3
Democratic	Sean Stinnett	2,806	6.2
Democratic	Joyce J. Smith	2,291	5.0
Democratic	George E. Mitchell	2,101	4.6
Democratic	Walter J. Horton	773	1.7
