= Bilal Ali =

American politician

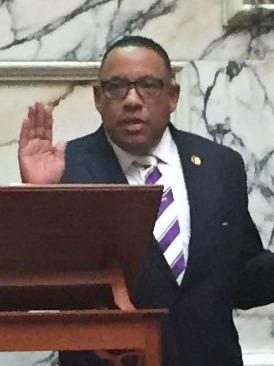

Member of the Maryland House of Delegates from the 41st district
- In office February 3, 2017 – January 9, 2019 Serving with Angela C. Gibson, Nathaniel T. Oaks, Samuel I. Rosenberg
- Preceded by: Jill P. Carter
- Succeeded by: Dalya Attar, Tony Bridges

Personal details
- Born: October 6, 1951 (age 74)
- Party: Democratic
- Education: Essex Community College, A.A.; University of Baltimore, B.A. (psychology); Coppin State University, M.A. (psychology)
- Occupation: Event promoter Community liaison, State's Attorney's Office, Baltimore City

Bilal Abdul Malik Ali is an American politician who served as a delegate to the Maryland General Assembly representing Maryland's District 41.

== Political career ==
Ali was appointed to the Maryland House of Delegates, filling the vacancy created when Jill P. Carter resigned. He was defeated for election in the 2018 Democratic primary.

=== In the legislature ===
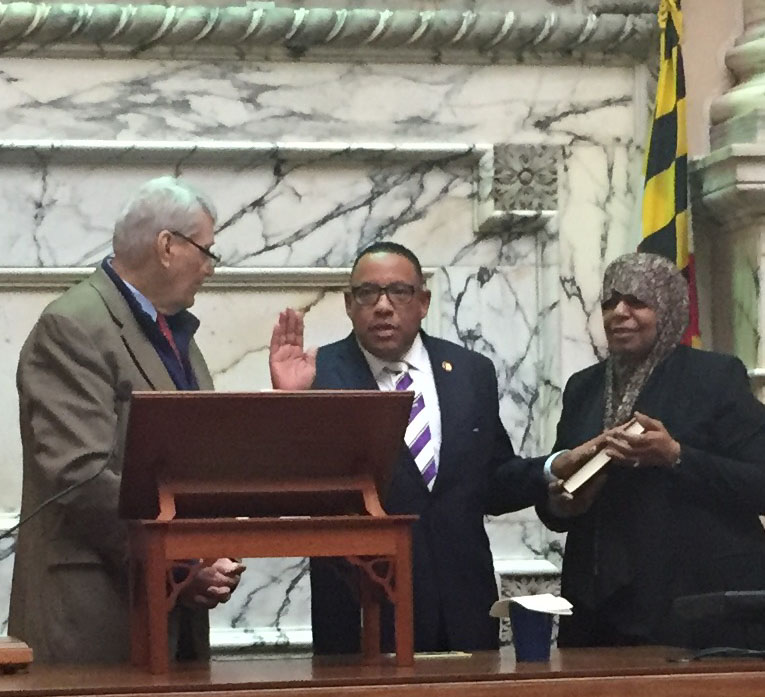
Maryland House Speaker Mike Busch swearing in new Delegate Bilal Ali

Ali was sworn in on February 3, 2017, and assigned to the House Ways and Means committee. He was a member of the Baltimore City Delegation and the Legislative Black Caucus of Maryland.

In January 2018 Ali introduced a bill entitled the "Jared Kushner Act" to prohibit the issuing of civil arrest warrants for tenants being sued for less than $5,000 in unpaid rent. This proposal followed a report the previous year that Kushner's apartment management company was Maryland's most aggressive landlord in obtaining civil arrest warrants.

In February 2018 Ali proposed disbanding and reconstituting the Baltimore Police Department in the wake of a police corruption trial. The Baltimore Sun reported that in reaction to this Sen. Joan Carter Conway questioned Ali's understanding of the police department.

== Election results ==
- 2018 Democratic Primary for Maryland House of Delegates – District 41

Voters to choose three:

| Name | Votes | Percent | Outcome |
|---|---|---|---|
| Samuel I. "Sandy" Rosenberg | 7,795 | 17.20% | Won |
| Dalya Attar | 7,773 | 17.10% | Won |
| Tony Bridges | 5,476 | 12.10% | Won |
| Angela C. Gibson | 5,308 | 11.70% | |
| Bilal Ali | 5,194 | 11.40% | |
| Richard Bruno | 2,996 | 6.60% | |
| Tessa Hill-Aston | 2,862 | 6.30% | |
| Sean Stinnett | 2,806 | 6.20% | |
| Joyce J. Smith | 2,291 | 5.00% | |
| George E. Mitchell | 2,101 | 4.60% | |
| Walter J. Horton | 773 | 1.70% | |
