= Sean Stinnett =

American politician (born 1971)

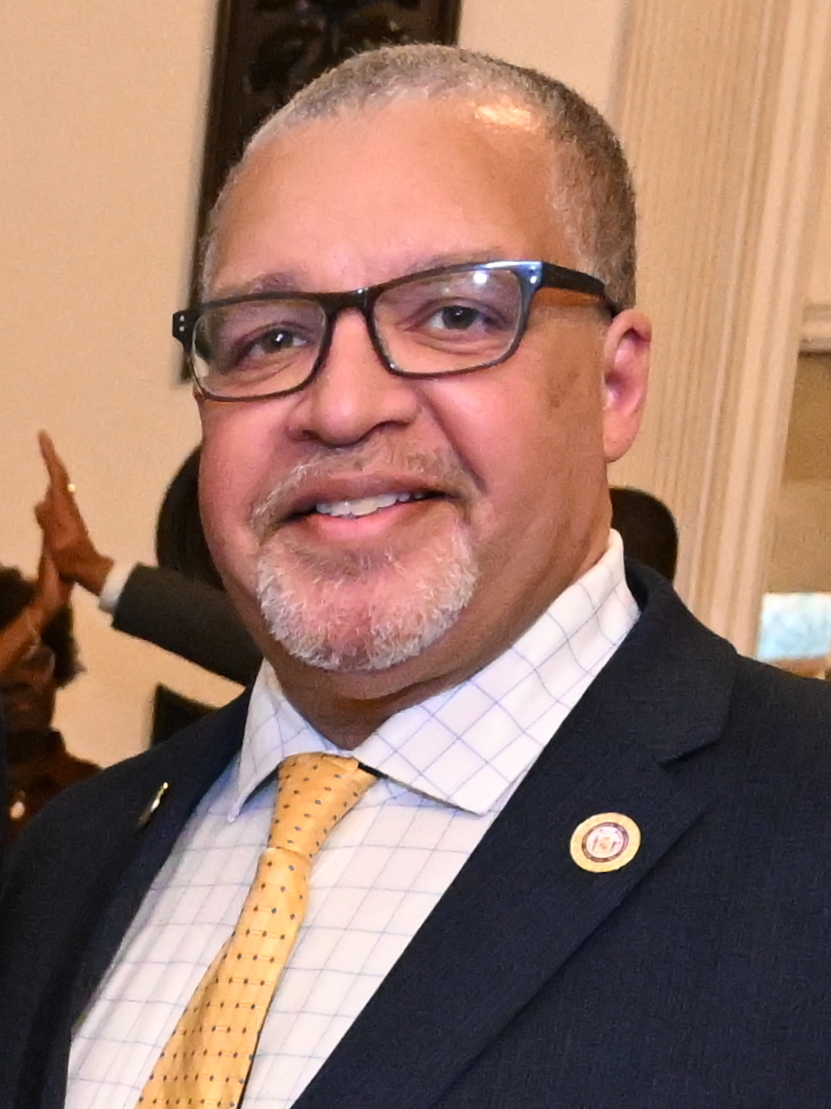
- Stinnett in 2025

Member of the Maryland House of Delegates from the 41st district
- Incumbent
- Assumed office March 3, 2025 Serving with Malcolm Ruff and Samuel I. Rosenberg
- Appointed by: Wes Moore
- Preceded by: Dalya Attar

Personal details
- Born: October 1971 (age 55) Baltimore, Maryland, U.S.
- Party: Democratic
- Spouse: Tammy
- Education: Baltimore City Community College; Coppin State University

Sean A. Stinnett (born October 1971) is an American politician serving as a member of the Maryland House of Delegates from the 41st district since 2025.

== Background ==
Stinnett was born in Baltimore in 1971. He graduated from the Baltimore School for the Arts in 1989, afterwards attending Baltimore City Community College, where he earned an associate of arts degree in communications, and Coppin State University, where he received a bachelor's degree in sports management. He also attended Pennsylvania Western University, California.

While attending Coppin State University, Stinnett was the editor in chief for the New Courier Newspaper and worked as a producer for the Rob Long Show & Jeremy Conn Show on WNST and as a writer for Ravens Insider. After graduating, he worked as sports administrator for Baltimore City Community College from 2007 to 2010, afterwards working as a staff writer for The Washington Afro-American newspaper and as an assistant coach for the Community College of Baltimore County men's basketball team from 2010 to 2011. From 2011 to 2013, Stinnett worked as the director of basketball operations for the Bowie State Bulldogs women's basketball team. Stinnett also worked as a procurement administrator for the Maryland Department of General Services from 2011 to 2021, as an operations director for the city of Baltimore from 2021 to 2023, and as a minority business enterprise compliance supervisor for the Maryland Department of General Services since 2023.

== In the legislature ==
In January 2017, after Jill P. Carter resigned from the Maryland House of Delegates to join Baltimore mayor Catherine Pugh's administration, Stinnett applied to fill the remainder of Carter's term in the legislature. He did not receive any votes from the Baltimore City Democratic Central Committee, which voted 5–1 to nominate Bilal Ali. Stinnett then ran unsuccessfully for the seat in 2018, placing eighth in the Democratic primary with 6.2% of the vote. In February 2025, after state delegate Dalya Attar was elevated to the Maryland Senate, Stinnett applied to serve the remainder of her term in the Maryland House of Delegates. He was nominated by the Baltimore City Democratic Central Committee by a 5–1 vote. Stinnett was appointed to the seat by Governor Wes Moore and sworn in on March 3, 2025.

Stinnett was a member of the Judiciary Committee from 2025 to 2027, afterwards serving on the Government, Labor, and Elections Committee. In February 2026, Stinnett, alongside state delegates Caylin Young and Sarah Wolek, established the Maryland Muslim Caucus.

Stinnett ran for election to a full term in 2026, during which he ran on a slate with state delegate Samuel I. Rosenberg and state senator Dalya Attar. Stinnett continued to support Attar after she was federally indicted on charges of extortion and conspiracy, telling The Baltimore Sun, "I'm not a judge, but we all say 'innocent until proven guilty'.".

== Political positions ==
During the 2026 legislative session, Stinnett supported a bill to raise the minimum wage of Maryland from $15 to $25 an hour and eliminate all subminimum wages.

== Personal life ==
Stinnett is married to his wife, Tammy Stinnett, an administrator for the Harris Jones & Malone lobbying firm who is the chair of the Baltimore City Democratic Central Committee as of February 2025. Together, they live in Arlington neighborhood of Baltimore. Stinnett is the president of the West Arlington Improvement Association and was a coordinator for the 300 Men March movement. During the COVID-19 pandemic in Maryland, Stinnett worked with fellow northeast Baltimore community leaders to provide residents with hygiene kits and face masks to prevent the spread of COVID-19. Stinnett is a Muslim.

== Electoral history ==
Maryland House of Delegates District 41 Democratic primary election, 2018
Party	Candidate	Votes	%
Democratic	Samuel I. Rosenberg (incumbent)	7,795	17.2
Democratic	Dalya Attar	7,773	17.1
Democratic	Tony Bridges	5,476	12.1
Democratic	Angela Gibson (incumbent)	5,308	11.7
Democratic	Bilal Ali (incumbent)	5,194	11.4
Democratic	Richard Bruno	2,996	6.6
Democratic	Tessa Hill-Aston	2,862	6.3
Democratic	Sean Stinnett	2,806	6.2
Democratic	Joyce J. Smith	2,291	5.0
Democratic	George E. Mitchell	2,101	4.6
Democratic	Walter J. Horton	773	1.7
