= Tony Bridges =

American politician

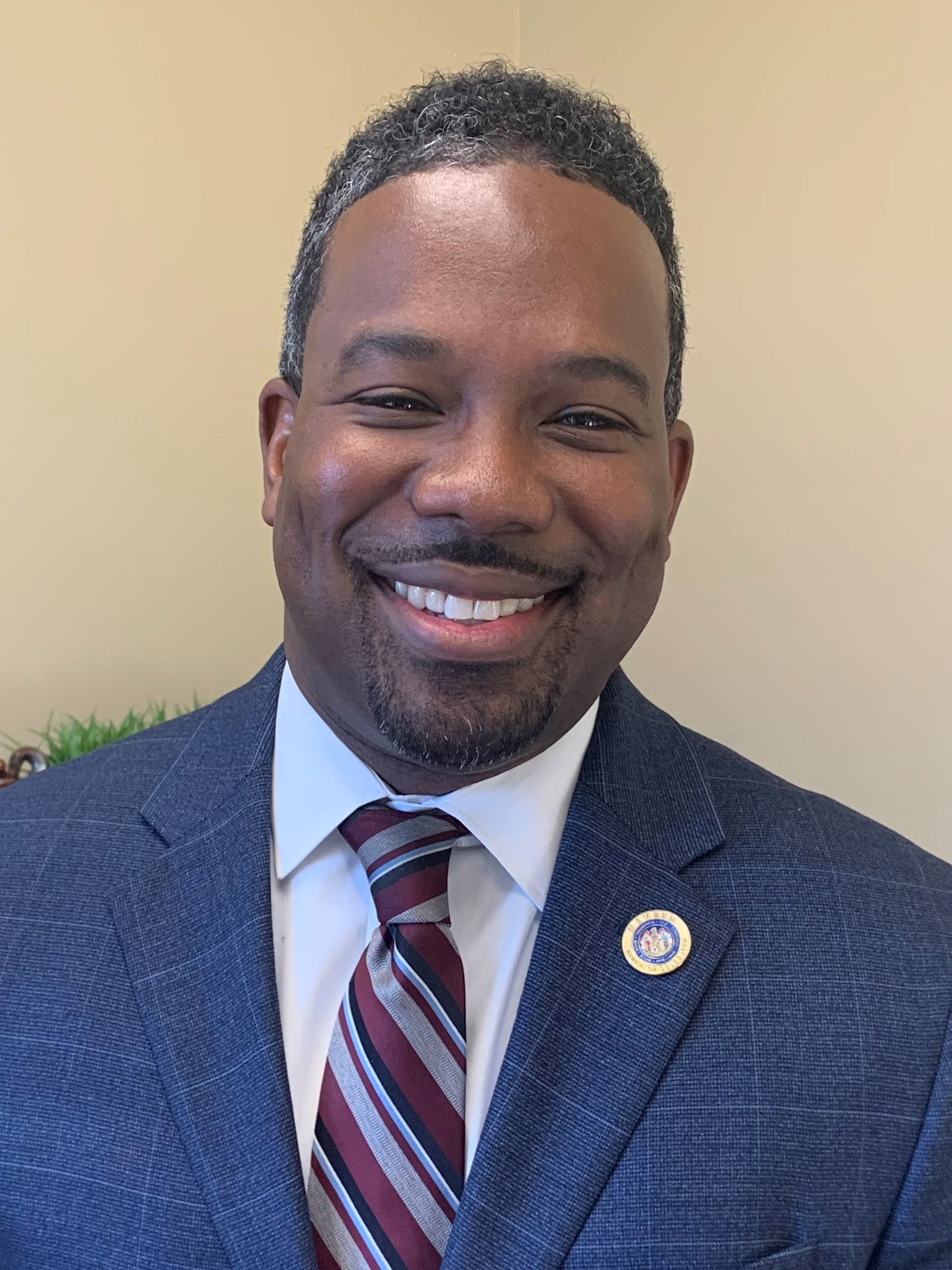
- Bridges in 2020

Administrator of the Maryland Transit Administration
- Incumbent
- Assumed office September 1, 2026
- Preceded by: Holly Arnold

Member of the Maryland House of Delegates from the 41st district
- In office January 9, 2019 – May 15, 2023
- Preceded by: Angela Gibson
- Succeeded by: Malcolm Ruff

Personal details
- Born: Deoleous Antonio Bridges II; January 21, 1977 (age 49) Baltimore, Maryland, U.S.
- Party: Democratic
- Children: 2
- Education: Baltimore Polytechnic Institute; Frostburg State University (BS)

Deoleous Antonio Bridges II (born January 21, 1977) is an American politician serving as administrator of the Maryland Transit Administration since September 2026. A member of the Democratic Party, he previously served as an assistant secretary for the Maryland Department of Transportation from 2023 to 2025, and as a deputy legislative officer to Governor Wes Moore from 2025 to 2026. From 2019 to 2023, Bridges was a member of the Maryland House of Delegates, representing the 41st district in west Baltimore.

== Early life and education ==
Bridges was born in Baltimore, Maryland, on January 21, 1977. He attended the Baltimore Polytechnic Institute and Frostburg State University, where he earned a B.A. degree in mass communications in 2000, and Towson University, where he received a certificate in communications and strategic public relations in 2002. After graduating from Towson, Bridges worked at the Mayor's Office of Neighborhoods and Constituent Services in Baltimore City, for which he eventually became the Executive Director in 2007.

== Career ==
After graduating from Towson, Bridges worked at the Mayor's Office of Neighborhoods and Constituent Services in Baltimore, eventually becoming the office's executive director in 2007. Afterwards, he worked as the chief of staff for the Governor's Office of Community Initiatives until 2013. He also served as a senior advisor for the Maryland Department of Transportation and as the chief of staff for the Maryland Transit Administration. In 2017, the Park Heights Renaissance named Bridges as its director of human services and operations.

=== Maryland House of Delegates ===
Bridges was sworn into the Maryland House of Delegates on January 9, 2019. During his tenure, he was a member of the Environment and Transportation Committee for part of the 2019 legislative session, afterwards serving on the Appropriations Committee until 2023, including as the vice chair of its oversight committee on pensions from 2021 to 2023. He was also a member of the Legislative Black Caucus of Maryland and the Maryland Legislative Transit Caucus.

=== Post-legislative career ===
Bridges resigned from the Maryland House of Delegates in May 2023, after Governor Wes Moore appointed Bridges as the assistant secretary for equity and engagement at the Maryland Department of Transportation. He served in this position until September 2025, when he became one of Moore's seven deputy legislative officers.

In July 2026, Moore named Bridges as the next administrator of the Maryland Transit Administration, succeeding Holly Arnold, who had announced her resignation. Bridges will take office on September 1, 2026.

== Electoral history ==
Maryland House of Delegates District 41 Democratic primary election, 2018
Party	Candidate	Votes	%
Democratic	Samuel I. Rosenberg (incumbent)	7,795	17.2
Democratic	Dalya Attar	7,773	17.1
Democratic	Tony Bridges	5,476	12.1
Democratic	Angela Gibson (incumbent)	5,308	11.7
Democratic	Bilal Ali (incumbent)	5,194	11.4
Democratic	Richard Bruno	2,996	6.6
Democratic	Tessa Hill-Aston	2,862	6.3
Democratic	Sean Stinnett	2,806	6.2
Democratic	Joyce J. Smith	2,291	5.0
Democratic	George E. Mitchell	2,101	4.6
Democratic	Walter J. Horton	773	1.7

Maryland House of Delegates District 41 election, 2018
Party	Candidate	Votes	%
Democratic	Dalya Attar	26,605	31.3
Democratic	Samuel I. Rosenberg (incumbent)	26,333	31.0
Democratic	Tony Bridges	26,194	30.9
Green	Drew A. Pate	5,350	6.3
Write-in		409	0.5

Maryland House of Delegates District 41 election, 2022
Party	Candidate	Votes	%
Democratic	Dalya Attar (incumbent)	26,438	32.5
Democratic	Samuel I. Rosenberg (incumbent)	25,557	31.4
Democratic	Tony Bridges (incumbent)	24,782	30.5
Republican	Scott Graham	4,240	5.2
Write-in		272	0.3
