= Dalya Attar =

American politician (born 1990)

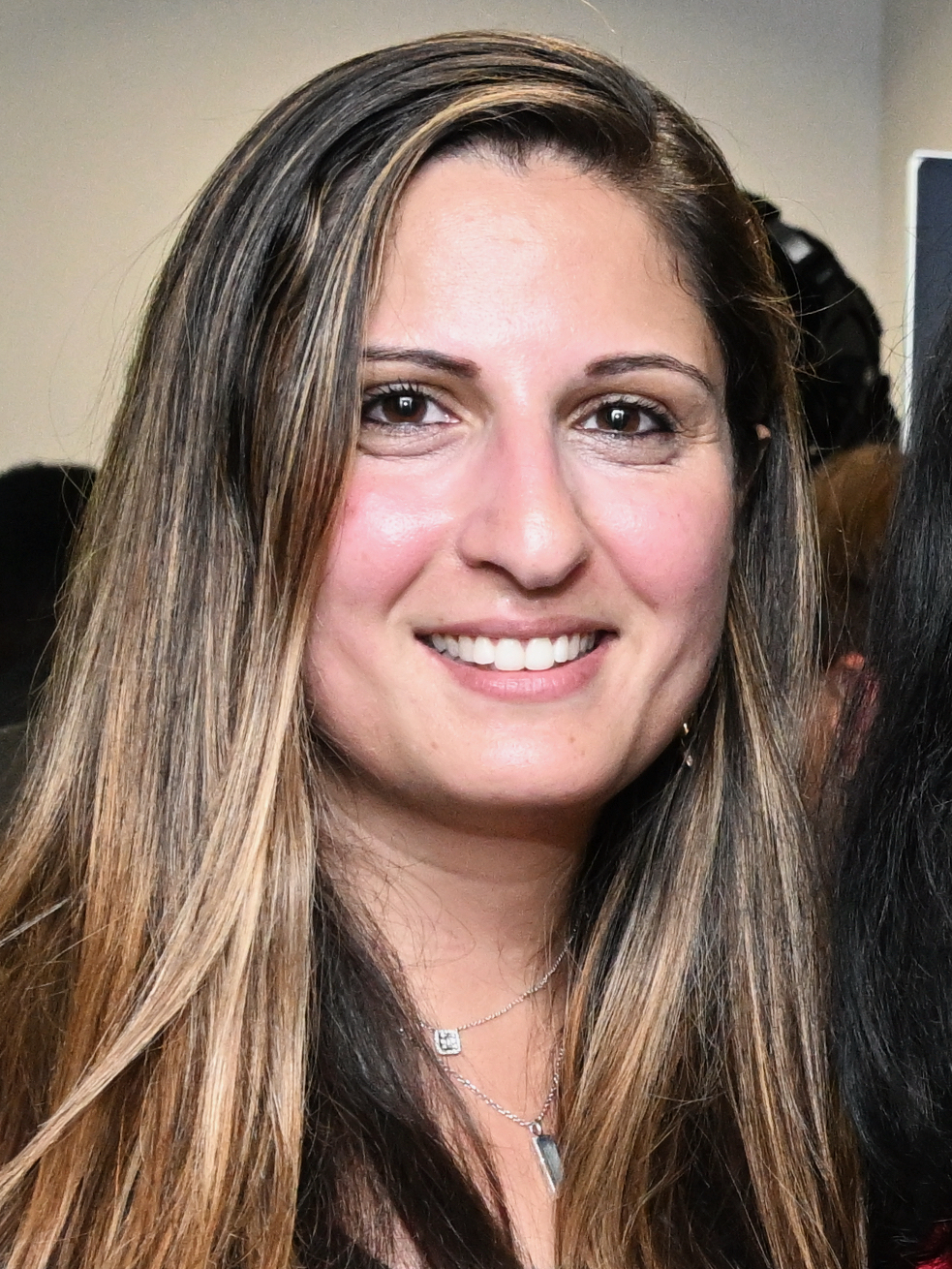
- Attar in 2023

Member of the Maryland Senate from the 41st district
- Incumbent
- Assumed office January 24, 2025
- Appointed by: Wes Moore
- Preceded by: Jill P. Carter

Member of the Maryland House of Delegates from the 41st district
- In office January 9, 2019 – January 24, 2025
- Preceded by: Bilal Ali
- Succeeded by: Sean Stinnett

Personal details
- Born: October 17, 1990 (age 35) Baltimore, Maryland, U.S.
- Party: Democratic
- Relations: Jay Attar (brother)
- Children: 2
- Education: University of Baltimore; University of Maryland Law School
- Profession: Attorney

Dalya Attar (born October 17, 1990) is an American politician and attorney who has served as a member of the Maryland Senate representing the 41st district since 2025. A member of the Democratic Party, she previously represented the district in the Maryland House of Delegates from 2019 to 2025. She is the first Orthodox Jewish person elected to the Maryland General Assembly and the first Orthodox Jewish woman to serve in the Maryland Senate.

In October 2025, Attar was indicted on federal extortion and conspiracy charges in connection with an alleged scheme to blackmail a former campaign consultant; she pleaded not guilty. She ran for a full four-year term in the 2026 election, but was defeated by state delegate Malcolm Ruff in the Democratic primary.

== Early life and education ==
Attar was born fourth of six children to an Iranian-Jewish father and a Moroccan-Jewish mother. She was raised as a Sephardi Orthodox Jew in Baltimore, where she attended the Bais Yaakov School for Girls. Attar later graduated from the University of Baltimore, where she earned a Bachelor of Science degree in criminal justice in 2011, and the University of Maryland, Baltimore, where she earned her Juris Doctor degree in 2014.

While attending the University of Baltimore, Attar worked as a paralegal for Greenspan, Hitzel & Schrader until 2015, when she became a trial attorney for the firm. In the same year, she also began working as an assistant state's attorney in the Baltimore State's Attorney office, prosecuting narcotics and firearms cases.

== Political career ==
Attar developed an interest in criminal justice while in middle school, and became interested in politics in high school. She has cited Joe Lieberman, Sarah Schenirer, and Karen Chaya Friedman, the first Orthodox Jewish woman to serve as a judge in Maryland, as her role models.

=== Maryland House of Delegates ===
On June 9, 2017, Attar announced that she would run for the Maryland House of Delegates in District 41. During the Democratic primary, she ran on a platform of spurring development, improving schools, and reforming the juvenile justice system. Attar won the Democratic primary in June 2018, defeating incumbents Angela Gibson and Bilal Ali.

Attar was sworn into the Maryland House of Delegates on January 9, 2019. She is the first Orthodox Jewish person elected to the Maryland General Assembly and the highest-ranking Orthodox Jewish woman in American history. Attar served on the Environment and Transportation Committee from 2019 to 2020, afterwards serving as a member of the Ways and Means Committee until 2025.

=== Maryland Senate ===
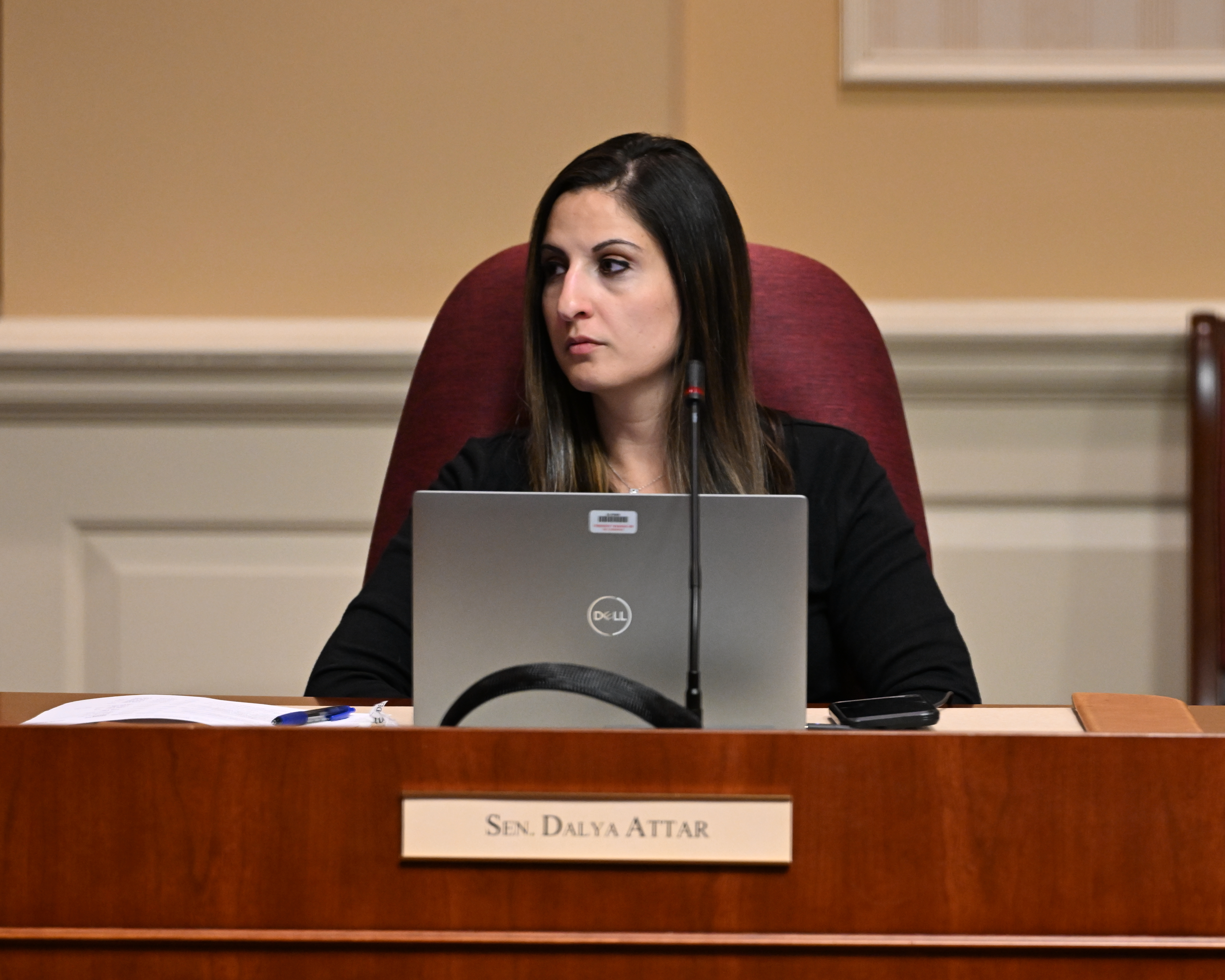
Attar in the Senate Education, Energy, and Environment Committee, 2025

In January 2025, after state senator Jill P. Carter resigned following her nomination to the Maryland State Board of Contract Appeals, Attar applied to fill the remainder of Carter's term in the Maryland Senate. The Baltimore City Democratic Central Committee voted 5–3 to nominate Attar to the seat later that month. She was appointed to the seat by Governor Wes Moore and sworn in on January 24, 2025, becoming the first Orthodox Jewish woman to serve in the Maryland Senate and the youngest member of the Maryland Senate as of 2025.

=== 2026 Maryland Senate campaign ===
Democratic primary results by precinct Ruff: 50–60%; 60–70%; 70–80%; 80–90%; Attar: 50–60%; 60–70%; 70–80%; 80–90%; Tie

Attar ran for election to a full term in 2026, during which she ran on a slate with delegates Samuel I. Rosenberg and Sean Stinnett. She also faced a primary challenge from state delegate Malcolm Ruff, who was backed by Moore, Baltimore mayor Brandon Scott, and U.S. representative Kweisi Mfume. In June 2026, Attar sought permission to use confidential evidence from the ongoing federal case against her in her primary campaign, which was rejected by U.S. District Court Judge Stephanie A. Gallagher.

Baltimore Brew described Attar as the frontrunner in the Democratic primary, during which she ran on law-and-order messaging that touted endorsements from the Baltimore Fraternal Order of Police and Baltimore state's attorney Ivan Bates (though Bates would distance himself from his endorsement of Attar following her October 2025 federal indictment) and highlighted state funding brought into the district. Attar was defeated by Ruff in the Democratic primary election on June 23, 2026.

== Federal charges ==
In October 2025, a federal grand jury indictment against Attar was unsealed in U.S. District Court in Baltimore. It charged Attar, her brother Jay Attar, and Baltimore Police officer Kalman Finkelstein with eight counts related to extortion, conspiracy and wiretapping, stemming from an alleged scheme to silence a former consultant on Attar's 2018 House of Delegates campaign with whom she had had a falling out. Prosecutors allege that the three tracked the consultant's movements, placed a GPS device on a vehicle she was using, and concealed cameras in an apartment where she was staying; the recordings captured her in bed with a romantic partner who was married to someone else. According to the indictment, the group intended to use the footage to deter the consultant from speaking out against Attar during her 2022 re-election campaign. The charges comprise one count of conspiracy, two of extortion, one of interception and disclosure of communications, and four of violating the Travel Act. According to documents obtained by The Baltimore Banner, the consultant involved in the blackmail scheme told prosecutors that Attar's motive in the plot was driven by questions about potential campaign finance violations that her campaign manager raised internally, which led Attar to fire her after she raised these concerns to her.

After her charges were made public, Attar released a statement onto a community Facebook page in which she described the consultant as a "disgruntled woman" whom she fired from her 2018 campaign "for cause" and admitted to some of the conduct alleged by federal prosecutors, including having the consultant followed and having her family capture a video of the consultant, but maintained that what she did was legal. She also rejected the federal blackmail charges, instead claiming that the consultant was extorting, harassing, threatening, and stalking her and people close to her for the next six years after her firing. Attar later deleted her statement. In November 2025, she pleaded not guilty to criminal charges in federal court.

In July 2026, U.S. District Court judge Stephanie A. Gallagher threw out most of the charges against Attar, including extortion, leaving only counts of conspiracy and intercepting electronic communications.

== Political positions ==
=== Crime and policing ===
In March 2019, Attar voted against a bill that would allow school resource officers to carry guns in Baltimore schools. She supported a bill that would allow Johns Hopkins University to have its own private police force. During the 2020 legislative session, Attar introduced a bill that would require incarceration for violent offenders with open warrants. She also supported a bill that would ban driver's license suspensions over unpaid parking tickets. In January 2025, Attar proposed expanding access to "Grade A schools" to address juvenile crime in Maryland.

During the 2025 legislative session, Attar voted for a bill to reform the Maryland Department of Juvenile Services, increase penalties for young people, and increase the number of charges kids aged 10 to 12 could face.

During the 2026 legislative session, Attar introduced the NyKayla Strawder Memorial Act, which would mandate services for young children whose actions resulted in someone's death.

=== Education ===
Attar supports improving public schools and providing publicly-funded scholarships for private schools.

=== Energy ===
During the 2025 legislative session, Attar supported the Next Generation Energy Act, which mandated the Maryland Public Service Commission to seek out energy generation proposals to support energy consumption on the state's highest usage days in the summer in an effort to phase out coal and gas-fired power generation in Maryland. In 2026, she voted for the Utility RELIEF Act, which prohibits energy companies from using forecast-based energy bill increases for one year and cuts funding for Maryland's EmPOWER program.

=== Healthcare ===
During the 2025 legislative session, Attar voted for legislation to allow the Maryland Prescription Drug Affordability Board to set upper payment limits for prescription drugs.

=== Immigration ===
During the 2026 legislative session, Attar supported the Community Trust Act, which prohibits counties from holding people detained at state prisons and local jails at the request of United States Immigration and Customs Enforcement (ICE) or from transferring detainees from one of its facilities unless presented with a valid judicial warrant.

=== Israel ===
During the 2024 legislative session, after Zainab Chaudry, the director of the state Council on American–Islamic Relations (CAIR) chapter, was temporarily suspended from the state Commission on Hate Crime Response and Prevention for making Facebook posts comparing Israel to Nazi Germany and calling attendees of the March for Israel "genocide sympathizers", Attar introduced legislation to remove Chaudry from the commission and replace her with "two members of the Muslim community". The bill was amended to remove representatives from organizations including CAIR from the hate crimes commission by requiring members to be advocates for protected classes under Maryland's hate crime laws.

=== Social issues ===
Attar supports using an independent redistricting commission to draw Maryland's legislative districts.

During the 2020 legislative session, Attar introduced a bill that would prevent husbands from having a civil divorce unless they granted their wife a gett.

In 2022, Attar voted against a bill that would expand the types of medical professionals who can perform abortions in the state, and voted to sustain Governor Larry Hogan's veto on the bill.

During the 2023 legislative session, Attar introduced legislation to move Maryland's 2024 primary date from April 23—the first day of Passover, which prevents Orthodox Jewish voters from participating in elections—to May 14. The bill's contents were added to another bill, which passed and was signed by Governor Wes Moore.

=== Taxes ===
In January 2025, Attar expressed doubts with proposals to increase income taxes on millionaires to address the state's $3 billion budget deficit, suggesting that they could just leave the state to avoid paying higher taxes. She also expressed support for cutting state funding for state universities, calling it her "first choice" in choosing how to address the deficit.

=== Transportation ===
During the 2022 legislative session, Attar supported a bill that would require the Maryland Department of Transportation to seek federal approval for the Red Line.

== Personal life ==
As of 2020, Attar is married to Asaf Mehrzadi, a longtime family friend. Together, they have two children. Her brother is Jay Attar, who is a developer in Baltimore County.

== Electoral history ==
Maryland House of Delegates District 41 Democratic primary election, 2018
Party	Candidate	Votes	%
Democratic	Samuel I. Rosenberg (incumbent)	7,795	17.2
Democratic	Dalya Attar	7,773	17.1
Democratic	Tony Bridges	5,476	12.1
Democratic	Angela Gibson (incumbent)	5,308	11.7
Democratic	Bilal Ali (incumbent)	5,194	11.4
Democratic	Richard Bruno	2,996	6.6
Democratic	Tessa Hill-Aston	2,862	6.3
Democratic	Sean Stinnett	2,806	6.2
Democratic	Joyce J. Smith	2,291	5.0
Democratic	George E. Mitchell	2,101	4.6
Democratic	Walter J. Horton	773	1.7

Maryland House of Delegates District 41 election, 2018
Party	Candidate	Votes	%
Democratic	Dalya Attar	26,605	31.3
Democratic	Samuel I. Rosenberg (incumbent)	26,333	31.0
Democratic	Tony Bridges	26,194	30.9
Green	Drew A. Pate	5,350	6.3
Write-in		409	0.5

Maryland House of Delegates District 41 election, 2022
Party	Candidate	Votes	%
Democratic	Dalya Attar (incumbent)	26,438	32.5
Democratic	Samuel I. Rosenberg (incumbent)	25,557	31.4
Democratic	Tony Bridges (incumbent)	24,782	30.5
Republican	Scott Graham	4,240	5.2
Write-in		272	0.3
