= Zainab Chaudry =

American Muslim civil rights activist

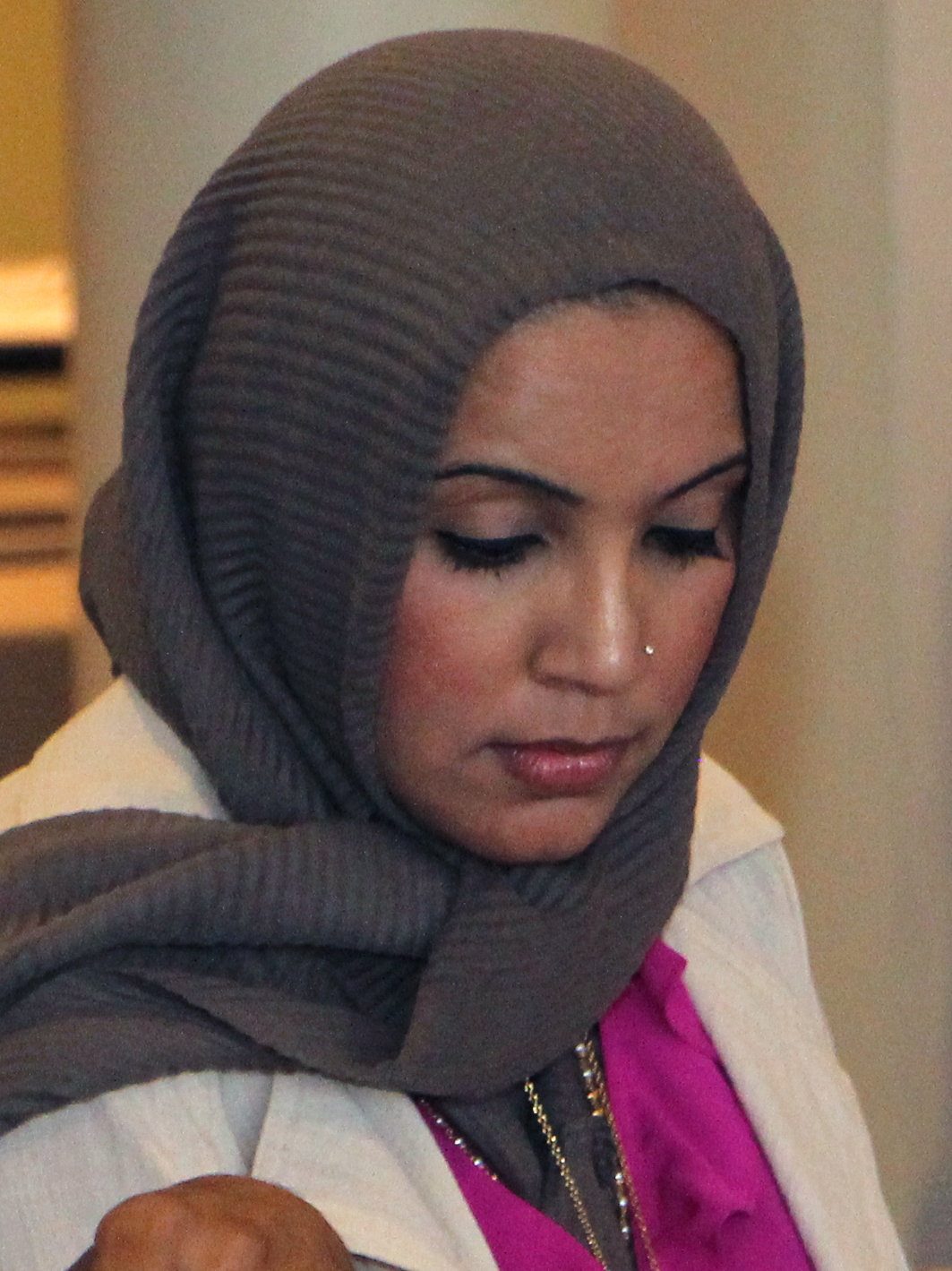
Chaudry in 2023

Zainab Chaudry is an American Muslim civil rights and political activist. She is the Maryland Director for the Council on American–Islamic Relations (CAIR).

== Education ==
Chaudry holds a Doctor of Pharmacy degree from the University of Maryland.

== Career ==
In 2015, Chaudry became the first Muslim appointed to the Maryland State Advisory Committee to the U.S. Commission on Civil Rights – an independent, bipartisan agency established by Congress in 1957 that advises the President and Congress on civil rights matters.

She was a 'Nominated Changemaker' at the 2016 White House Summit on the United State of Women. Additionally, she was recognized as one of The Baltimore Sun's 25 'Women to Watch' in 2016.

Working with the Maryland Commission on Civil Rights and the Maryland Governor's Office on Community Initiatives, Chaudry organized Maryland's first statewide emergency preparedness summit for interfaith leaders. She is the Maryland Director for the Council on American–Islamic Relations (CAIR).

In August 2023 Chaudry was nominated to the Maryland Commission on Hate Crime Response and Prevention.

== Political positions ==
In 2023, Chaudry supported a protest by Muslim, Christian, and Jewish parents demanding a right to continue to opt-out of LGBT materials required by the Montgomery County School Board in Montgomery County, Maryland. She also wrote a Washington Post oped on the issue.

Following the Gaza war Chaudry had posted several comments on her private social media accounts in which she compared Israel to Nazis, called into question the claim that babies had been murdered in the October 7 Hamas-led attack, criticized Israel's response to the October 7 attack, and condemned the disproportionate killing of innocent Gazan civilians. Chaudry refused to retract or apologize for these comments, stating her posts were taken out of context and her First Amendment rights were infringed upon. In response to these comments, Chaudry was temporarily suspended from the Maryland Commission on Hate Crime Response and Prevention on November 21, 2023. She was reinstated on December 6, 2023, as there is no legal mechanism for suspension or early termination of membership in the commission.

During the 2024 legislative session, state delegates Dalya Attar, Samuel I. Rosenberg, and Joe Vogel introduced legislation to remove Chaudry and specifically individuals from the Muslim civil rights group, CAIR, from the Maryland Commission on Hate Crime Response and Prevention and replace her with "two members of the Muslim community". Chaudry testified against the legislation, during which she said that she was receiving death threats because of her Facebook posts, which she stated were mischaracterized. She further stated that the controversy surrounding her comments was "manufactured" in order to "minimize and silence communities simply asking for justice". She also added that the commission was regularly meeting to establish a code of conduct for its members following the controversy. Attar's bill passed in March 2024, in an amended form that did not mention CAIR or any other organization. The bill, instead, gave Maryland's Attorney General broad discretion to appoint 15 members of the commission from protected classes under Maryland's hate crime laws. The bill was signed into law by Governor Wes Moore and Chaudry, along with all of its other members, were removed from the Maryland Commission on Hate Crime Response and Prevention after it went into effect on June 1, 2024. Chaudry did not apply to be reappointed to the hate crime commission—whose new members were appointed by Attorney General Anthony Brown on July 31, 2024—saying that she believed the commission's communications policy would be "exploited to suppress advocacy for Palestinian human rights".

Chaudry supported House Joint Resolution 2, sponsored by state delegate Gabriel Acevero, which condemns the October 7 attack on Israel as well as Israel's response, calls for a long-term ceasefire, and publicly opposes antisemitism, Islamophobia, anti-Palestinian and anti-Arab bigotry.
