= Choate House (Randallstown, Maryland) =

Historic house in Maryland, United States

- U.S. National Register of Historic Places
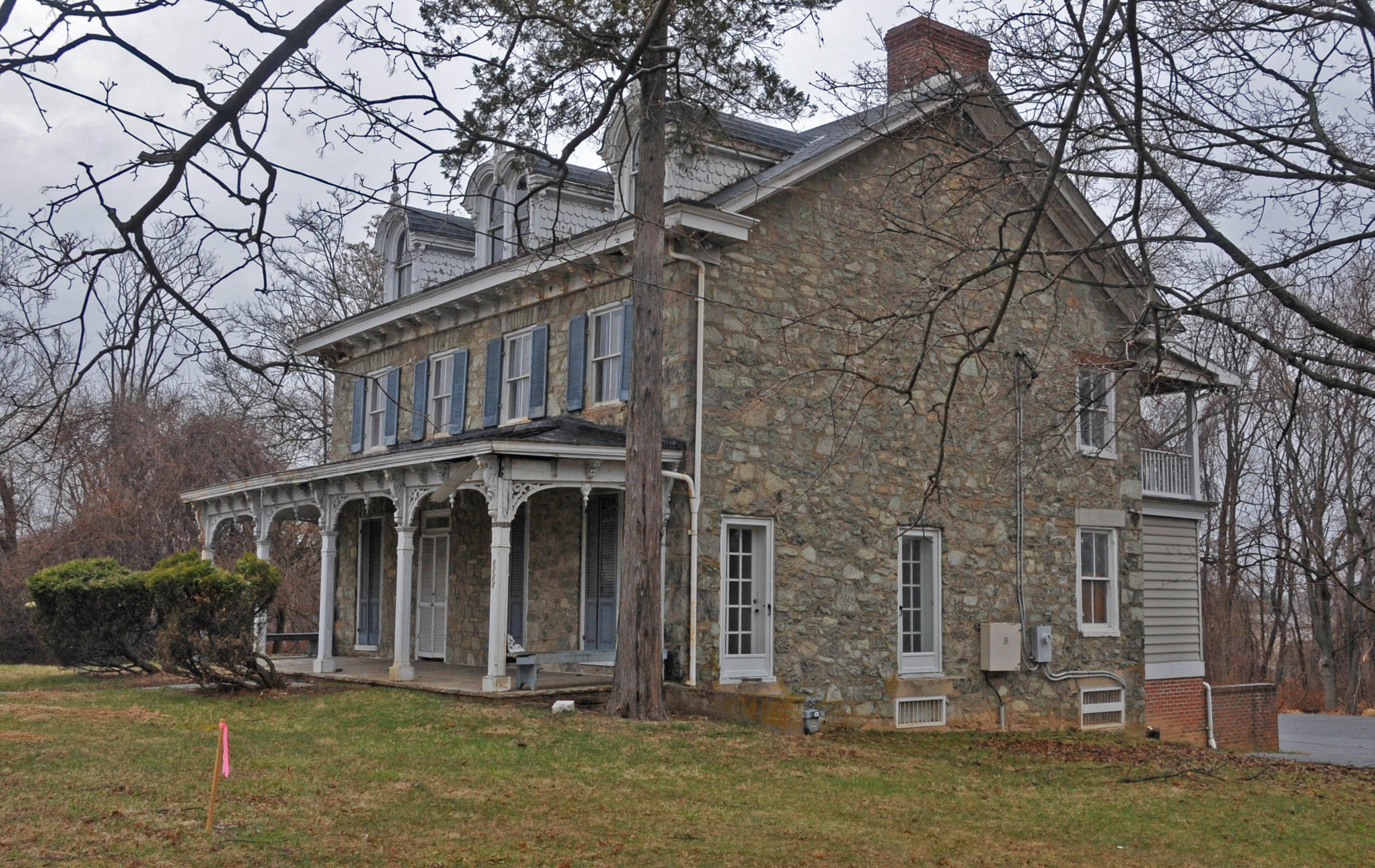

- Location within Maryland Location within the United States
- Location: 9600 Liberty Road (MD 26), Randallstown, Maryland
- Coordinates: 39°22′35″N 76°48′52″W
- Area: less than one acre
- Built: 1810
- Architectural style: Italianate, Federal
- NRHP reference No.: 89000807
- Added to NRHP: July 20, 1989

Choate House was a historic home located at Randallstown, Baltimore County, Maryland. It was a 2 1/2-story gable-roofed stone building built in 1810, with a porch and dormers added in the 1880s. The Italianate style was probably applied in the 1880s and include a full-length porch.

It was listed on the National Register of Historic Places in 1989, but was not listed on the Baltimore County list of local landmarks by request of its owners, who did not want it added to the list because landmarked buildings were harder to sell.

In March 2025, the Choate House was demolished by developer Jay Attar, who was developing a 12-acre parcel for 242 townhouses in the area. Attar's company bought the property for $750,000 in 2024, shortly after which county councilmember Julian E. Jones Jr. attempted to add the building to the county's local landmarks list. Jones then arranged community hearings at Attar's request to see if anyone would object to its demolition; after nobody came forward to speak against it, Attar applied for a permit to raze the building on January 11, 2025, which was approved by the county on February 11.
