= Jay Attar =

Baltimore real estate developer

- Born: Joseph Attar; 1986 (age 39–40); Baltimore, Maryland, U.S.
- Occupation: Real estate developer
- Relatives: Dalya Attar

Jay Attar is an American real estate developer from Baltimore, Maryland. Attar is the president of Attar Enterprises, a real estate company. In March 2025, Attar demolished Choate House, a historic house listed on the National Register of Historic Places. As a result of the demolition, Baltimore County Council passed two bills protecting historic landmarks. In October 2025, a federal indictment was made public charging him with extortion and conspiracy in connection to an alleged effort in which he, a Baltimore Police officer, and his sister, state senator Dalya Attar tried to blackmail a political consultant.

Born to an Iranian-Jewish father and a Moroccan-Jewish mother, Attar is one of six siblings. He was raised as a Sephardi Orthodox Jew in Baltimore.
