= Samuel I. Rosenberg =

American politician (born 1950)

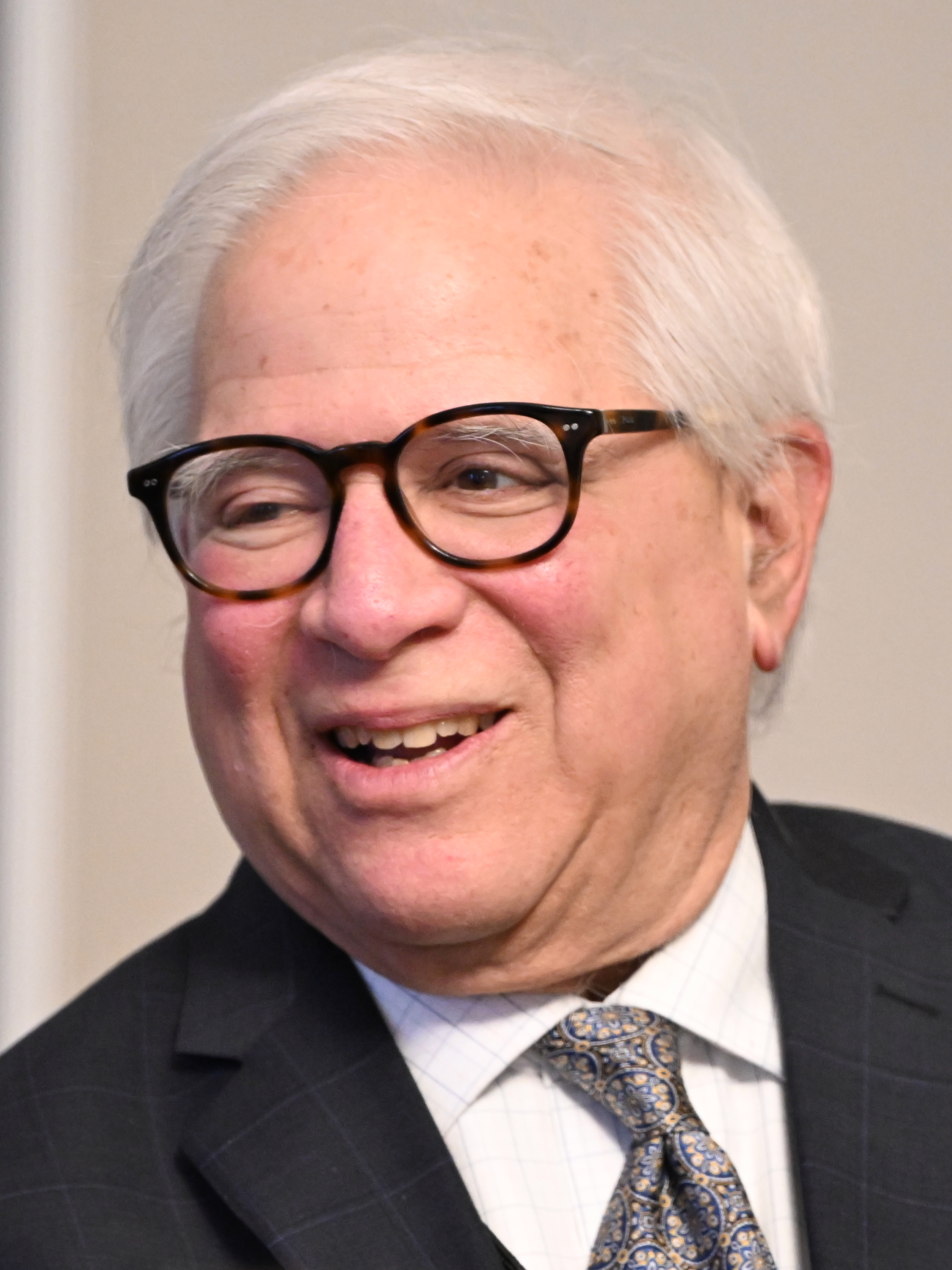
- Rosenberg in 2025

Member of the Maryland House of Delegates
- Incumbent
- Assumed office January 12, 1983 Serving with Sean Stinnett, Malcolm Ruff
- Preceded by: Steven V. Sklar
- Constituency: 42nd district (1983–2003); 41st district (2003–present)

Personal details
- Born: Samuel Isadore Rosenberg; May 18, 1950 (age 76) Baltimore, Maryland, U.S.
- Party: Democratic
- Education: Baltimore City College; Amherst College (BA); Columbia University (JD)

Samuel Isadore Rosenberg (born May 18, 1950) is an American politician who has served as a member of the Maryland House of Delegates representing northwest Baltimore since 1983. He is currently the longest serving member of the Maryland General Assembly.

== Early life and education ==
Samuel Isadore Rosenberg was born in Baltimore on May 18, 1950, to father Benedict Lewis Rosenberg and mother Babette Hecht. He grew up in the city's Cross Country neighborhood, where he was a member of the Har Sinai Congregation.

Rosenberg attended Baltimore City College and graduated from Amherst College with a Bachelor of Arts degree in political science in 1972, and Columbia University, earning his Juris Doctor degree in 1975.

== Career ==
=== Early career ===
While attending Columbia University, Rosenberg worked as an intern for the Baltimore state's attorney's office. He resigned from this position in July 1974 to run for the Democratic Central Central Committee in the 42nd district, but continued working as an unpaid volunteer in the same position to avoid violating the Hatch Act. Rosenberg was elected to the Baltimore City Democratic Central Committee in September 1974. From 1975 to 1976, and again from 1979 to 1981, he worked as a program administrator for the Baltimore Housing Authority, in between working as a producer and assistant for WJZ-TV's Square Off talk show. Afterwards, Rosenberg worked as a congressional assistant and as a lobbyist for Baltimore Mayor William Donald Schaefer in the Maryland General Assembly from 1980 to 1981. He later taught a class in legislation at the University of Maryland Francis King Carey School of Law.

=== Maryland House of Delegates ===
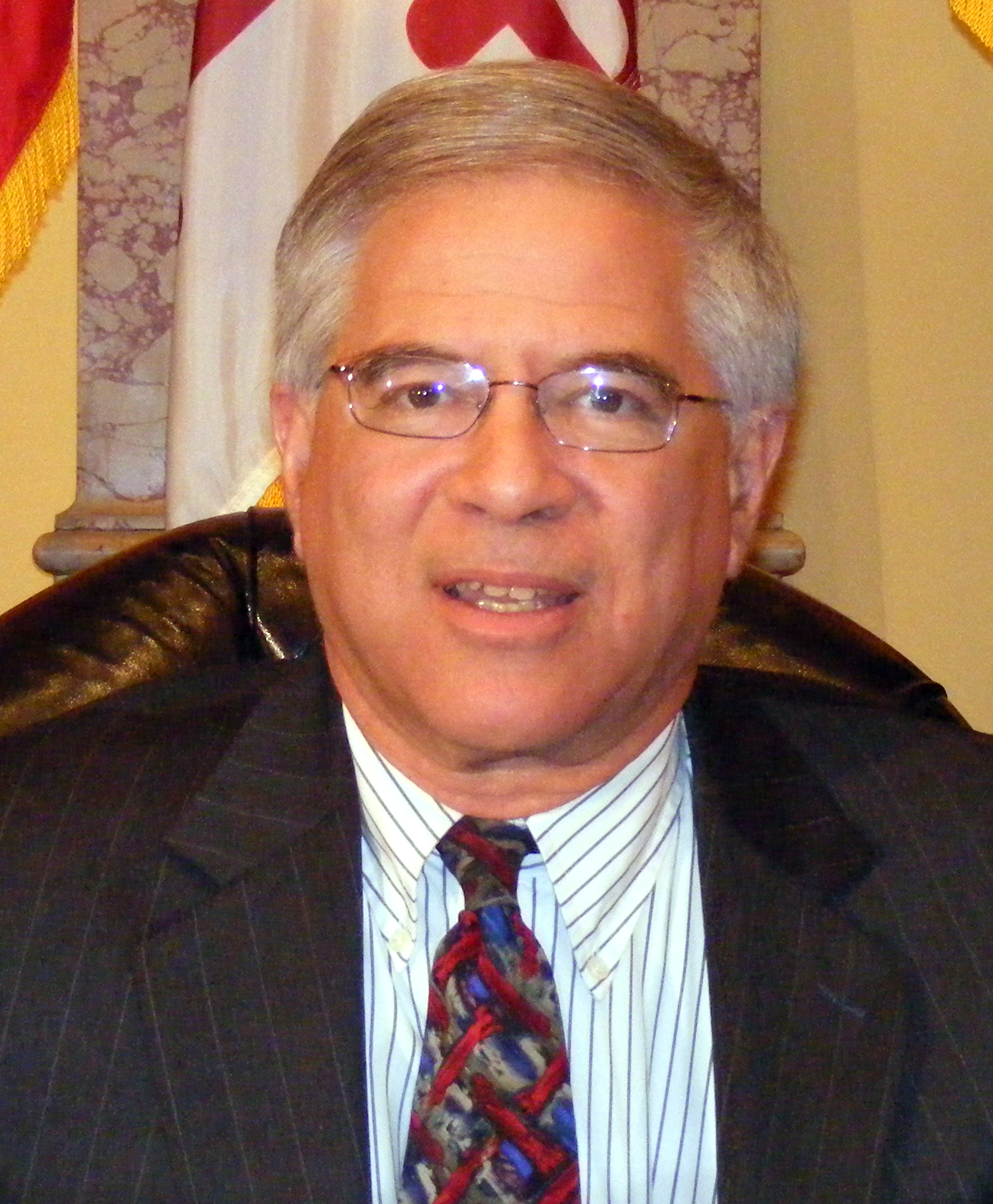
Rosenberg in 2007

In 1982, Rosenberg ran for the Maryland House of Delegates in District 42. He won the Democratic primary in September, placing third and defeating incumbent state Delegates Steven V. Sklar and David B. Shapiro. Rosenberg was sworn in on January 12, 1983. In 2002, he was redrawn into the 41st district, where he successfully ran for re-election.

During his first twenty years in the House of Delegates, Rosenberg served as a member of the Appropriations Committee, afterwards serving in the Health and Government Operations Committee until 2004. From 2004 to 2011, and again from 2013 to 2016, he served as a member of the Judiciary Committee, in between serving as the vice-chair of the Ways and Means Committee. Since 2017, Rosenberg has served as a member of the Health and Government Operations Committee and as the chair of the government operations and long-term care subcommittee.

In October 1983, after state Senator Rosalie Silber Abrams was appointed to serve as the director of the Maryland Office of Aging, Rosenberg applied to serve the remainder of her term in the Maryland Senate. The Baltimore City Democratic Central Committee voted 4–1 to nominate Maryland Democratic Party executive director Barbara Hoffman to fill the seat later that month.

Rosenberg was a delegate to the Democratic National Convention in 1988, 1996, and 2000.

Rosenberg ran for re-election in 2026, during which he ran on a slate with state delegate Sean Stinnett and state senator Dalya Attar. Rosenberg continued to support Attar after she was federally indicted on charges of extortion and conspiracy, citing their work together on issues including the Pimlico Race Course.

== Political positions ==
=== Abortion ===
Rosenberg has been described by media outlets as being pro-choice. In November 1981, he signed onto a National Organization for Women letter endorsing the U.S. Supreme Court's decision in Roe v. Wade and opposing efforts to pass the Human Life Amendment to overturn the Roe decision. In the legislature, Rosenberg supported efforts to expand Medicaid funding for abortions and to increase funding for family planning services to prevent teenage pregnancies.

In July 1989, following the Supreme Court's ruling in Webster v. Reproductive Health Services, Rosenberg endorsed efforts to repeal the state's 1968 laws on abortion, which required abortions in the state to be performed in a hospital and approved by a hospital review committee. He introduced a bill to do so during the 1990 legislative session, which died in committee. Rosenberg reintroduced the bill in 1991, during which it passed and was signed into law by Governor William Donald Schaefer. After the bill went to referendum in 1992, he supported efforts to uphold the law.

During the 2005 legislative session, Rosenberg introduced the Ronald Reagan and Christopher Reeve Stem Cell Research Act, which would provide $25 million a year in state funding toward stem cell research. The bill was reintroduced in 2006, during which it passed and was signed into law by Governor Bob Ehrlich.

In 2023, Rosenberg introduced legislation to shield the health care and insurance information of people who travel to Maryland to receive an abortion.

=== Crime and policing ===
Rosenberg is the author of Maryland's 1988 hate-crimes statute. In October 1998, following the murder of Matthew Shepard, he introduced legislation to expand the hate crimes statute to include sexual orientation.

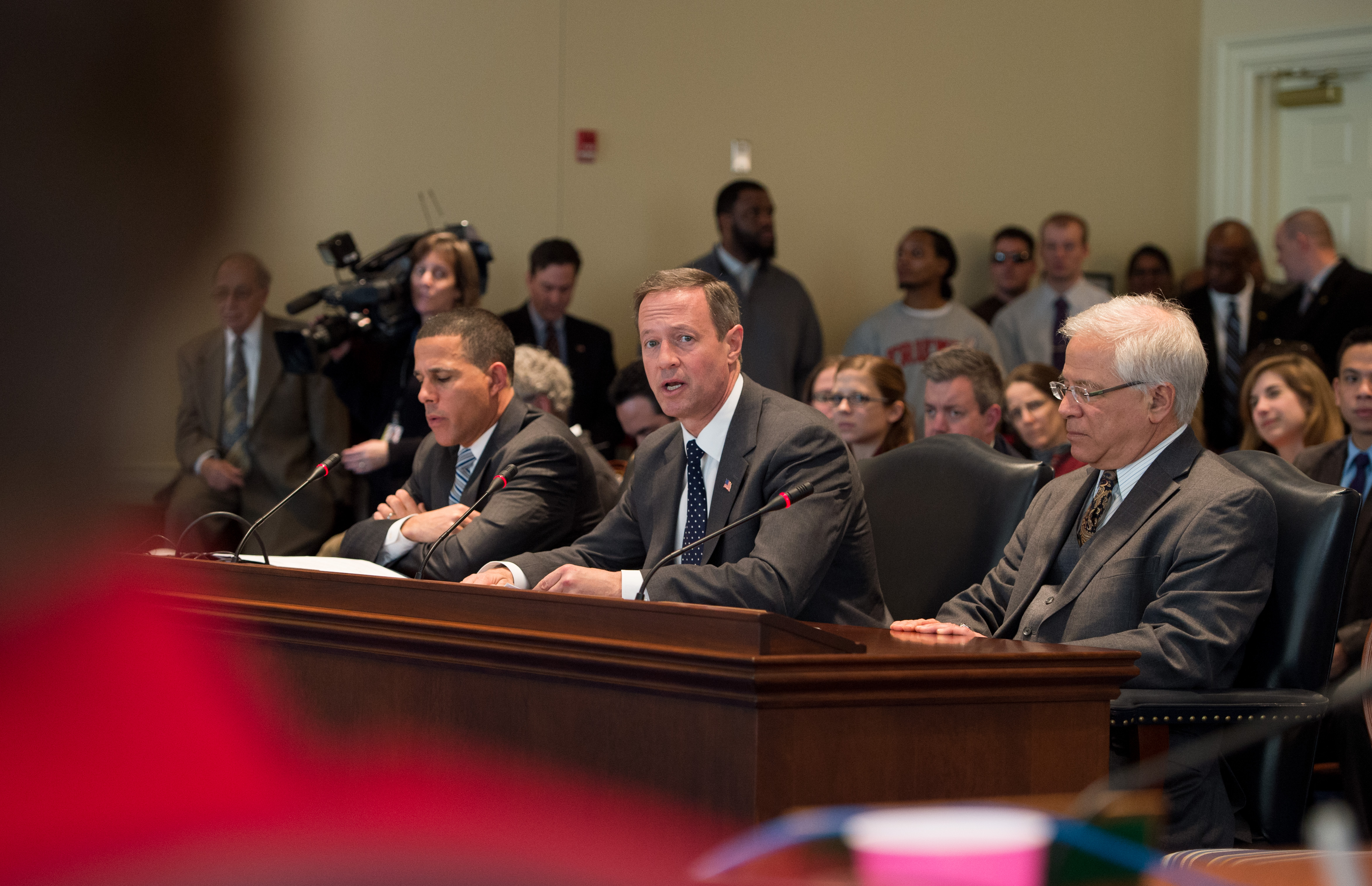
Rosenberg (right) testifies with Governor Martin O'Malley (center) and Lieutenant Governor Anthony Brown (left) on legislation to repeal the death penalty, 2013.

During the 2007 legislative session, Rosenberg introduced legislation to repeal the death penalty. After a similar measure failed in 2008, he expressed support for a compromise bill that would limit the use of capital punishment. He testified for the repeal bill when it was reintroduced in 2013, during which it passed and was signed into law by Governor Martin O'Malley.

In 2008, Rosenberg supported legislation to expand the state's collection of DNA samples, which was developed under a work group he led.

During the 2009 legislative session, Rosenberg supported legislation to prohibit police from spying on political activists and peaceful protest groups.

In March 2019, Rosenberg supported a bill that would allow Johns Hopkins University to have its own private police force.

During the 2021 legislative session, Rosenberg voted for Anton's Law and the Maryland Police Accountability Act.

=== Gun policy ===
During the 1986 legislative session, Rosenberg voted for a bill that would overturn a Maryland Court of Appeals ruling that allowed victims of crimes committed with Saturday night special handguns to sue the weapon's manufacturers. In 1996, he voted for a gun control bill to limit handgun purchases and prohibit domestic abusers from owning firearms.

In December 2012, following the Sandy Hook Elementary School shooting that left 28 dead, Rosenberg said he would support a ban on assault weapons in Maryland. During the 2013 legislative session, he voted for the Firearm Safety Act, which banned assault weapons and placed restrictions on firearm purchases.

=== Housing ===
In January 1980, Rosenberg opposed a bill that would give tenants three days' notice to pay overdue rent. During his 1982 House of Delegates campaign, he expressed support for increasing state assistance for home purchasers and renters. In 1983, Rosenberg introduced legislation requiring colleges buying apartment buildings to extend state protections to residents of the building.

During the 1985 legislative session, Rosenberg introduced legislation to provide tax credits to homeowners to remove lead paint. In 1987, he introduced a bill that would allow tenants to put their rent in escrow if lead paint is found in their homes. During the 2000 legislative session, Rosenberg introduced legislation that would allow tenants to recover damages from lead paint manufacturers, which died in committee following aggressive lobbying efforts by paint manufacturers. He criticized efforts to weaken state lead paint laws under the Hogan administration.

In 1999, Rosenberg introduced a bill that would expand the state's definition of abandoned properties and give the city of Baltimore more power to condemn and demolish such buildings. In 2000, he introduced legislation to increase staffing in the Maryland Department of Housing to combat home flipping in Baltimore.

During the 2021 legislative session, Rosenberg supported legislation to establish a right to counsel in eviction cases. After the bill became law, he signed onto a letter to Governor Larry Hogan calling on him to use federal rent relief funding to support the access to counsel bill. In 2022, Rosenberg introduced a bill to fund the state's right to counsel fund using unclaimed settlement payments from state lawsuits against property management companies. The bill passed and became law without Hogan's signature.

=== Israel ===
During the 2017 legislative session, Rosenberg introduced legislation to prohibit the state from contracting with companies that supported the Boycott, Divestment and Sanctions (BDS) movement. The bill failed to pass out of the legislature, but became law after Governor Larry Hogan signed an executive order implementing it in October 2017.

In October 2023, amid the Gaza war, Rosenberg participated in a rally supporting Israel in Baltimore. During the 2024 legislative session, Rosenberg supported a bill to remove Maryland Council on American–Islamic Relations director Zainab Chaudry from the Maryland Commission on Hate Crime Response and Prevention after she made posts on Facebook comparing Israel to Nazi Germany, denied that Israeli children were murdered during the October 7 Hamas-led attack on Israel, and condemned the killing of innocent Gazan civilians.

=== Pimlico Race Course ===
During the 2003 legislative session, after Governor Bob Ehrlich proposed locating slot machines at the Pimlico Race Course, Rosenberg expressed concerns that the plan would worsen public safety and traffic in the area, and only said that he would vote for slots if a bill he introduced to reinvest profits earned from the slots toward redevelopment efforts in neighborhoods surrounding the race course was added to it. He voted against the slots bill in 2005.

In December 2018, Rosenberg endorsed a $442 million plan to redevelop parts of the Pimlico Race Course. He supported an unsuccessful bill to approve the plan during the 2019 legislative session, which was later renegotiated to transfer a portion of the costs onto the Stronach Group, which owns Pimlico, and to include investments in communities surrounding the race course. During the 2023 legislative session, Rosenberg supported legislation to establish a horse racing oversight board.

=== Social issues ===
During his 1982 House of Delegates campaign, Rosenberg said he supported giving state employees collective bargaining rights, but opposed giving public safety employees the right to strike. In 1984, he voted for a bill to limit cost of living adjustments to the state employees' pension system.

During the 1986 legislative session, Rosenberg voted against a bill to prohibit selling video tapes containing obscene materials to minors, arguing that children would still be able to listen to the banned records on the radio, which could be recorded easily.

In 1988, Rosenberg introduced legislation to prohibit the Federal Bureau of Investigation's Library Awareness Program from investigating the library records of foreigners without a subpoena. The bill unanimously passed by the Maryland General Assembly and was signed into law by Governor William Donald Schaefer.

In December 1996, Rosenberg said he supported a bill that would test welfare applicants for drug use, saying that it would deter parents of young children from using drugs and incentivize treatment. In July 2019, he said he opposed a Trump administration proposal to limit Supplemental Nutrition Assistance Program benefits to 130 percent of the federal poverty level. During the 2020 legislative session, Rosenberg introduced legislation to create a state job training program for people who lost their SNAP benefits as a result of the proposal.

During the 2001 legislative session, Rosenberg supported a bill to ban discrimination against homosexuals, which passed and became law. In February 2012, he voted for the Civil Marriage Protection Act, which legalized same-sex marriage in Maryland.

In 2008, Rosenberg supported a statewide referendum to legalize early voting in Maryland. During the 2013 legislative session, he introduced legislation to extend early voting through Sunday before the election.

In August 2017, Rosenberg condemned the Unite the Right rally in Charlottesville, Virginia, calling it "horrendous".

During the 2021 legislative session, Rosenberg voted to repeal "Maryland, My Maryland" as the official state anthem.

=== Transportation ===
During the 2011 legislative session, Rosenberg introduced legislation that would require companies that submit bids to take over the Camden and Brunswick Lines to disclose whether, and how, they were involved in The Holocaust. The bill would have only impacted French railway company SNCF (whose subsidiary, Keolis, submitted a bid to operate the lines), whom Rosenberg says should "still be held liable for the damage done to Holocaust victims". The bill was amended to require companies with Holocaust links to speed up the digitization of their archives and signed into law by Governor Martin O'Malley. In January 2014, after Keolis submitted a bid to build and operate the Purple Line, Rosenberg said he would not expand the 2011 law to cover Purple Line bidders, saying that the law had "served its purpose" after SNCF digitized its World War II archives.

In 2022, Rosenberg introduced a bill to require the Maryland Department of Transportation to seek federal approval for an east-west rail line in Baltimore.

== Personal life ==
Rosenberg is Jewish and is a member of the Beth Am Synagogue. He has lived in the Coldspring neighborhood of Baltimore since December 1977.

Rosenberg is a fan of the Baltimore Orioles. He attended the Orioles's fantasy camp in Sarasota, Florida, where he mostly played catcher.

== Electoral history ==
Maryland House of Delegates District 42 Democratic primary election, 1982
Party	Candidate	Votes	%
Democratic	Ben Cardin (incumbent)	11,270	24.2
Democratic	James W. Campbell (incumbent)	8,409	18.1
Democratic	Samuel I. Rosenberg	8,297	17.8
Democratic	Steven V. Sklar (incumbent)	8,152	17.5
Democratic	David B. Shapiro (incumbent)	5,594	12.0
Democratic	Joseph Abraham	4,781	10.3

Maryland House of Delegates District 42 election, 1982
Party	Candidate	Votes	%
Democratic	Ben Cardin (incumbent)	19,511	31.2
Democratic	James W. Campbell (incumbent)	19,171	30.6
Democratic	Samuel I. Rosenberg	18,476	29.5
Republican	Allen G. Shoemaker	2,706	4.3
Republican	Eleanor Holliday Cross	2,691	4.3

Maryland House of Delegates District 42 election, 1986
Party	Candidate	Votes	%
Democratic	Samuel I. Rosenberg (incumbent)	16,143	30.3
Democratic	James W. Campbell (incumbent)	16,000	30.0
Democratic	David B. Shapiro	14,978	28.1
Republican	Nicholas B. Fessenden	3,396	6.4
Republican	Ernest B. Gray Sr.	2,750	5.2

Maryland House of Delegates District 42 election, 1990
Party	Candidate	Votes	%
Democratic	Samuel I. Rosenberg (incumbent)	12,633	34.1
Democratic	James W. Campbell (incumbent)	12,477	33.7
Democratic	Delores G. Kelley	11,949	32.2

Maryland House of Delegates District 42 election, 1994
Party	Candidate	Votes	%
Democratic	Samuel I. Rosenberg (incumbent)	22,464	35.0
Democratic	James W. Campbell (incumbent)	20,944	32.6
Democratic	Maggie McIntosh (incumbent)	20,840	32.4

Maryland House of Delegates District 42 election, 1998
Party	Candidate	Votes	%
Democratic	Samuel I. Rosenberg (incumbent)	21,768	30.4
Democratic	James W. Campbell (incumbent)	20,903	29.2
Democratic	Maggie McIntosh (incumbent)	20,443	28.6
Republican	Jeffrey B. Smith Jr.	8,399	11.7

Maryland House of Delegates District 41 election, 2002
Party	Candidate	Votes	%
Democratic	Jill P. Carter	22,643	35.2
Democratic	Samuel I. Rosenberg (incumbent)	21,146	32.9
Democratic	Nathaniel T. Oaks (incumbent)	20,335	31.6
Write-in		204	0.3

Maryland House of Delegates District 41 election, 2006
Party	Candidate	Votes	%
Democratic	Jill P. Carter (incumbent)	24,189	33.7
Democratic	Samuel I. Rosenberg (incumbent)	21,751	30.3
Democratic	Nathaniel T. Oaks (incumbent)	20,570	28.6
Republican	Tony Asa	5,166	7.2
Write-in		129	0.2

Maryland House of Delegates District 41 election, 2010
Party	Candidate	Votes	%
Democratic	Jill P. Carter (incumbent)	24,985	33.5
Democratic	Samuel I. Rosenberg (incumbent)	22,654	30.4
Democratic	Nathaniel T. Oaks (incumbent)	21,931	29.4
Republican	Mark Ehrlichmann	4,723	6.3
Write-in		207	0.3

Maryland House of Delegates District 41 election, 2014
Party	Candidate	Votes	%
Democratic	Jill P. Carter (incumbent)	24,038	35.1
Democratic	Samuel I. Rosenberg (incumbent)	22,284	32.6
Democratic	Nathaniel T. Oaks (incumbent)	21,551	31.5
Write-in		516	0.7

Maryland House of Delegates District 41 election, 2018
Party	Candidate	Votes	%
Democratic	Dalya Attar	26,605	31.3
Democratic	Samuel I. Rosenberg (incumbent)	26,333	31.0
Democratic	Tony Bridges	26,194	30.9
Green	Drew A. Pate	5,350	6.3
Write-in		409	0.5

Maryland House of Delegates District 41 election, 2022
Party	Candidate	Votes	%
Democratic	Dalya Attar (incumbent)	26,438	32.5
Democratic	Samuel I. Rosenberg (incumbent)	25,557	31.4
Democratic	Tony Bridges (incumbent)	24,782	30.5
Republican	Scott Graham	4,240	5.2
Write-in		272	0.3
