= Malcolm Ruff =

American politician (born 1984)

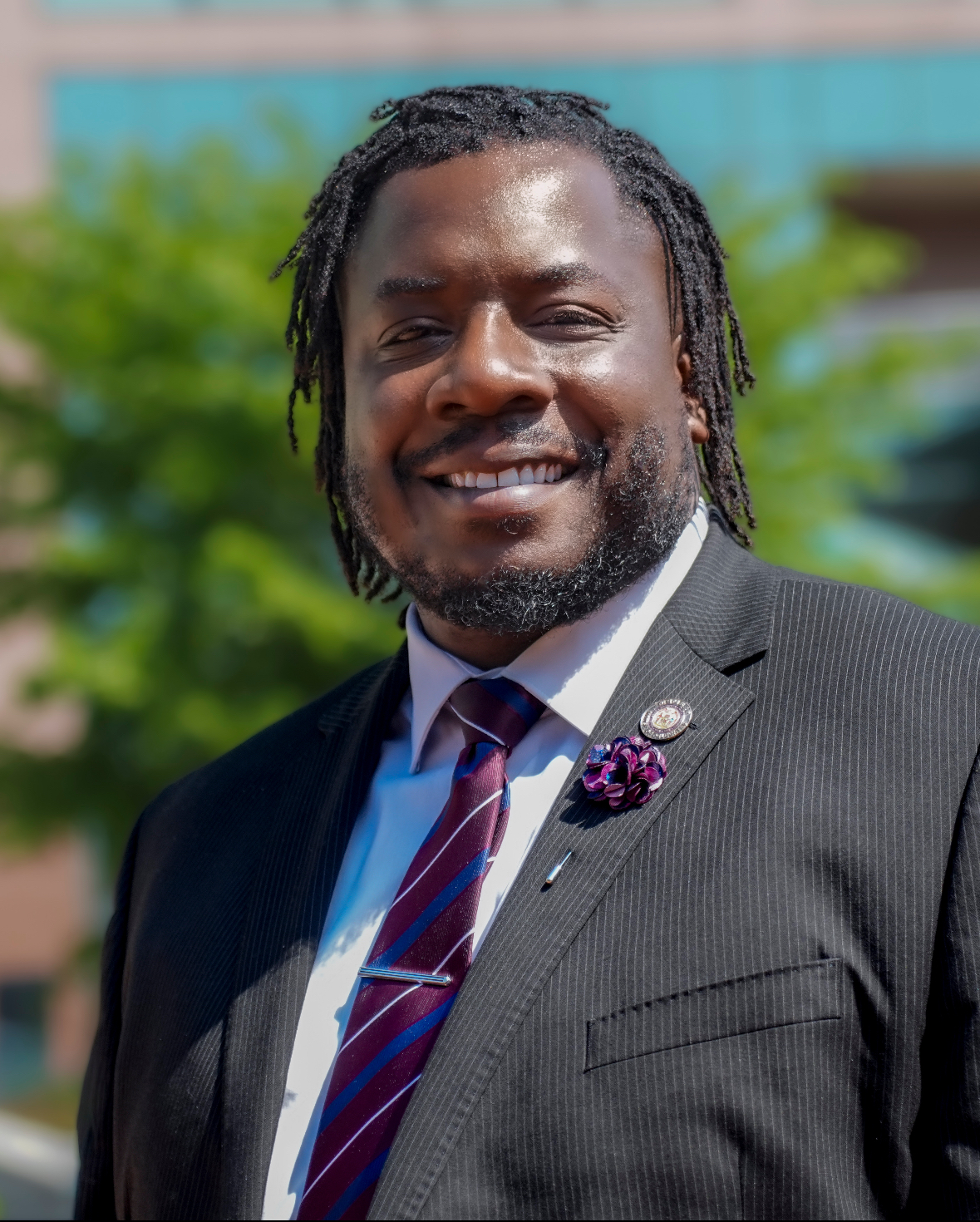
- Ruff in 2026

Member-elect of the Maryland Senate from the 41st district
- Assuming office January 13, 2027
- Succeeding: Dalya Attar

Member of the Maryland House of Delegates from the 41st district
- Incumbent
- Assumed office July 6, 2023
- Appointed by: Wes Moore
- Preceded by: Tony Bridges

Personal details
- Born: April 18, 1984 (age 42) Baltimore, Maryland, U.S.
- Party: Democratic
- Spouse: Sydnee
- Children: 4
- Education: Duke University (BA); University of Baltimore (JD)
- Occupation: Attorney
- Website: Campaign website

Malcolm Peter Ruff (born April 18, 1984) is an American politician and attorney who is a member-elect of the Maryland Senate from District 41. A member of the Democratic Party, Ruff has served as a member of the Maryland House of Delegates from District 41 since 2023.

Born and raised in Baltimore, Ruff graduated from Duke University and the University of Baltimore School of Law. Ruff is an associate with the law firm Murphy, Falcon & Murphy, which is managed by prominent civil rights attorney Billy Murphy Jr. He has been described as a protégé of Murphy.

Ruff was appointed to the Maryland House of Delegates by Governor Wes Moore in 2023. In 2026, he ran for the Maryland Senate, defeating incumbent state senator Dalya Attar in the Democratic primary and running unopposed in the general election.

== Early life and education ==
Ruff was born in Baltimore on April 18, 1984. He grew up in the Park Heights neighborhood of Baltimore, and spent his summers on a small family-owned farm in Harford County, Maryland. Ruff graduated from the Gilman School in 2002, where he was considered a track and football standout. He later attended Duke University, where he played for the Duke Blue Devils football team and earned a bachelor's degree in African and African American studies in 2006. Ruff later attended the University of Baltimore School of Law, where he earned a Juris Doctor degree in 2012. While at the University of Baltimore, he was one of only six students nationwide selected for the NAACP-Kellogg's Law Fellow program.

== Legal career ==
Ruff has been a member of the Maryland Bar since 2012. He began his legal career as an assistant state's attorney in Baltimore and Baltimore County, where he prosecuted criminal cases. From 2014 to 2018, he worked as a trial attorney for the Saller & Biship law firm. Afterwards, Ruff became a partner at the Murphy, Falcon & Murphy law firm. In this position, he has represented several victims of police brutality and wrongful death matters, including in the cases of Jordan McNair, William Green, Quinton Burns, Taizier Griffin, Renardo Green, Zayne Abdullah, and Demonte Ward-Blake.

Outside of his legal career, Ruff is the founder of the Pagya Project, a non-profit to support residents of underserved communities and to address homelessness and street violence in Baltimore.

In February 2023, Ruff participated in and spoke at a Tyre Nichols protest at Festival Park in Aberdeen, Maryland, where he read a list of names of African Americans killed in police encounters and suggested that police agencies "clean house".

== Political career ==
=== Maryland House of Delegates ===
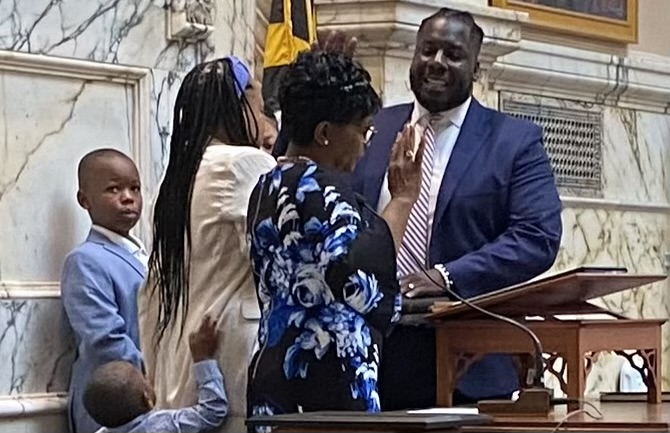
Malcolm Ruff, with his family, being sworn in by House Speaker Adrienne A. Jones

In May 2023, after state delegate Tony Bridges was appointed to be the assistant secretary of the Maryland Department of Transportation, Ruff applied to fill the vacancy left by his resignation in the Maryland House of Delegates. In June 2023, the Baltimore City Democratic Central Committee voted to send Governor Wes Moore the names of both Ruff and former state delegate Angela Gibson for consideration to fill the vacancy. On June 18, 2023, Moore appointed Ruff to fill the vacancy. He was sworn in on July 6, 2023.

House speaker Adrienne A. Jones assigned Ruff to the Appropriations Committee. He was also a member of the Legislative Black Caucus of Maryland and the Baltimore City Delegation. In January 2026, new Speaker of the Maryland House of Delegates Joseline Peña-Melnyk appointed Ruff Chairman of the Capital Budget subcommittee of the Appropriations committee.

=== Maryland Senate ===
==== 2026 election ====
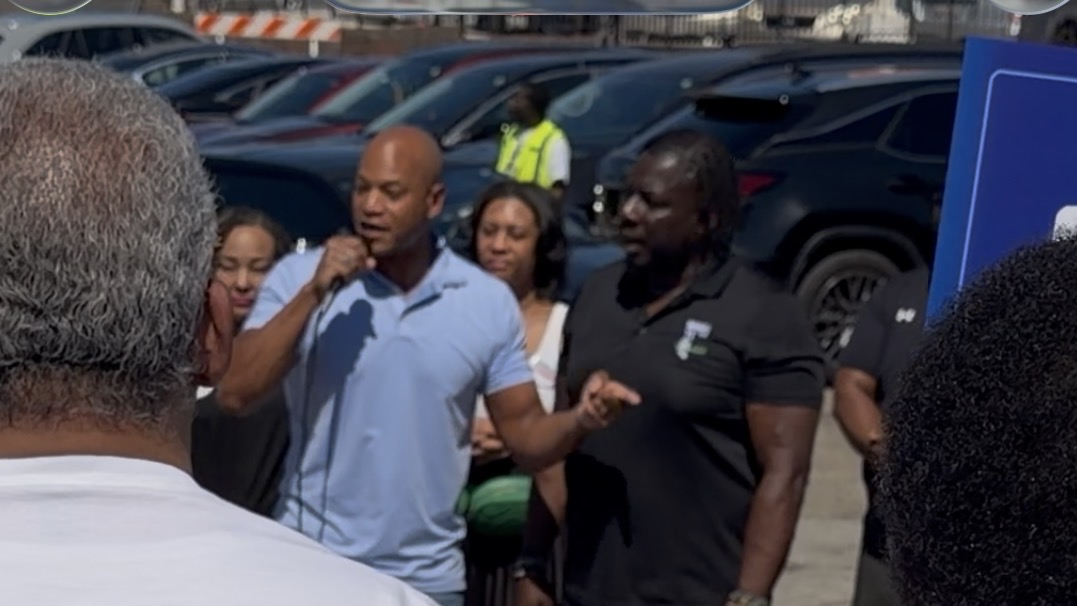
Governor Moore speaks at Malcolm Ruff rally in Edmondson Village, Baltimore, May 18, 2026.

In January 2025, after state senator Jill P. Carter resigned following her nomination to the Maryland State Board of Contract Appeals, Ruff applied to fill the remainder of Carter's term in the Maryland Senate. Ruff was backed by Carter and Baltimore lawyer Billy Murphy Jr. The Baltimore City Democratic Central Committee voted 5–3 to nominate Dalya Attar to the seat later that month. In August 2025, Ruff announced that he would run for the Maryland Senate in District 41, challenging Attar.

Baltimore Brew described Ruff as the underdog in the Democratic primary, during which Ruff touted juvenile justice bills he introduced in the General Assembly and highlighted state funding brought into the district, including toward the Enoch Pratt Free Library and the Gwynns Falls/Leakin Park preservation project. He also sought to bring attention to Attar's federal extortion charges and received endorsements from Governor Moore, U.S. representative Kweisi Mfume, and Baltimore mayor Brandon Scott. Ruff defeated Attar in the Democratic primary election on June 23, 2026.

==== Tenure ====
Ruff will be sworn in on January 13, 2027. He will be a member of the Senate Education, Energy, and the Environment Committee.

== Political positions ==
=== Crime and policing ===
During the 2024 legislative session, Ruff was one of eight members of the Maryland House of Delegates to vote against a bill to reform the Maryland Department of Juvenile Services, increase penalties for young people, and increase the number of charges kids aged 10 to 12 could face, saying that the bill would "impact the Black community in a way that is unfair". In 2026, Ruff introduced the NyKayla Strawder Memorial Act, which would mandate services for young children whose actions resulted in someone's death.

=== Energy ===
During the 2025 legislative session, Ruff supported the Next Generation Energy Act, which mandated the Maryland Public Service Commission to seek out energy generation proposals to support energy consumption on the state's highest usage days in the summer in an effort to phase out coal and gas-fired power generation in Maryland. In 2026, he voted for the Utility RELIEF Act, which prohibits energy companies from using forecast-based energy bill increases for one year and cuts funding for Maryland's EmPOWER program.

=== Gun control ===
During the 2026 legislative session, Ruff supported a bill that would ban the sale of firearms that can be converted into automatic firearms through the use of a Glock switch.

=== Healthcare ===
During the 2025 legislative session, Ruff voted for legislation to allow the Maryland Prescription Drug Affordability Board to set upper payment limits for prescription drugs.

=== Housing and development initiatives ===
During the 2024 legislative session, Ruff introduced a bill that would create a state-city partnership for the preservation of Gwynns Falls/Leakin Park, Baltimore's largest park, which passed and was signed into law by Governor Moore.

During the 2026 legislative session, Ruff introduced legislation to study incidents of mortgage fraud in Maryland. The bill passed and was signed into law by Governor Moore.

=== Immigration ===
During the 2026 legislative session, Ruff supported the Community Trust Act, which prohibits counties from holding people detained at state prisons and local jails at the request of United States Immigration and Customs Enforcement (ICE) or from transferring detainees from one of its facilities unless presented with a valid judicial warrant.

== Personal life ==
Ruff lives in Baltimore. He is married to his wife, Sydnee, and has four children. He is a member of the Heritage United Church of Christ.
