= Maryland Legislative District 41 =

American legislative district

Maryland's legislative district 41
- Represents part of the City of Baltimore
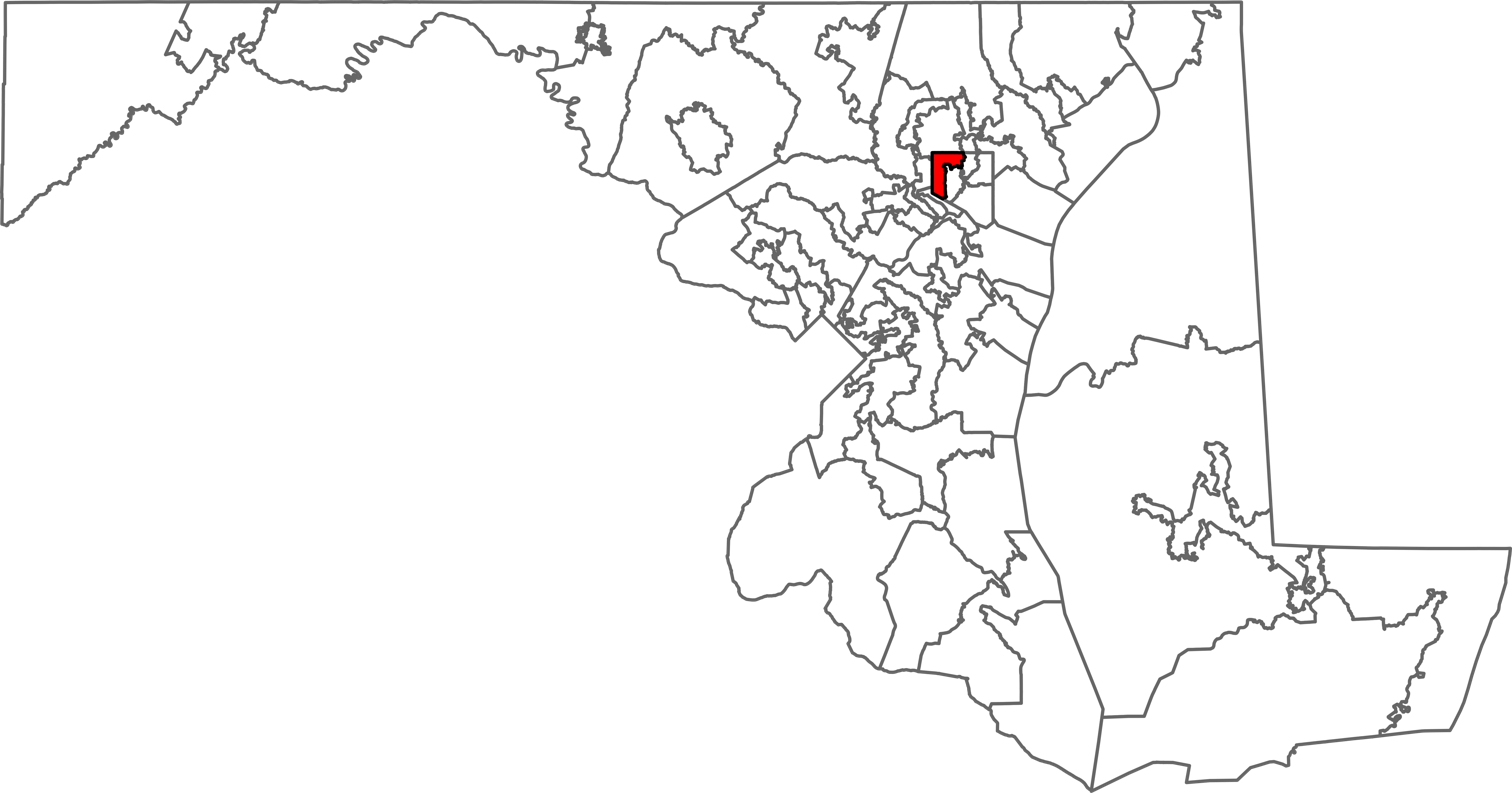
- Senator: Dalya Attar (D)
- Delegate(s): Malcolm Ruff (D); Samuel I. Rosenberg (D); Sean Stinnett (D)
- Registration: 81.2% Democratic; 6.7% Republican; 11.0% unaffiliated
- Demographics: 26.6% White; 63.1% Black/African American; 0.3% Native American; 2.9% Asian; 0.0% Hawaiian/Pacific Islander; 2.9% Other race; 4.2% Two or more races; 4.5% Hispanic
- Population (2020): 108,555
- Voting-age population: 86,477
- Registered voters: 77,305

Maryland Legislative District 41 is one of 47 legislative districts in the state of Maryland and one of the 5 located entirely within Baltimore City. The district is represented by three delegates in the Maryland House of Delegates.

== Demographic characteristics ==
As of the 2020 United States census, the district had a population of 108,555, of whom 86,477 (79.7%) were of voting age. The racial makeup of the district was 28,897 (26.6%) White, 68,444 (63.1%) African American, 300 (0.3%) Native American, 3,134 (2.9%) Asian, 11 (0.0%) Pacific Islander, 3,156 (2.9%) from some other race, and 4,599 (4.2%) from two or more races. Hispanic or Latino of any race were 4,832 (4.5%) of the population.

The district had 77,305 registered voters as of October 17, 2020, of whom 8,531 (11.0%) were registered as unaffiliated, 5,155 (6.7%) were registered as Republicans, 62,768 (81.2%) were registered as Democrats, and 574 (0.7%) were registered to other parties.

== Educational institutions ==
The 41st district is home to:

=== High schools ===
Baltimore Polytechnic Institute, Western High School, Forest Park High School (Maryland), Bryn Mawr School, Gilman School, Roland Park Country School, Friends School, Edmondson-Westside High School and Northwestern High School (Baltimore, Maryland)

=== K-8 schools ===
Roland Park Elementary/Middle School, School of the Cathedral of Mary Our Queen

== Political representation ==
The district is represented for the 2023–2027 legislative term in the State Senate by Dalya Attar (D) from 2023-2025 and in the House of Delegates by Malcolm Ruff (D), Sean Stinnett (D), and Samuel I. Rosenberg (D).

== Election results ==
2006 Primary Race for Maryland House of Delegates – District 41 Voters to choose three:
Name	Votes	Percent	Outcome
Jill P. Carter, Dem.	13,196	31.2%	Won
Samuel I. Rosenberg, Dem.	9,215	21.8%	Won
Nathaniel T. Oaks, Dem.	9,189	21.7%	Won
Wendall Phillips	6,480	15.3%	Lost
Kevin Hargrave	2,095	5.0%	Lost
Karen M. Ferguson	2,116	5.0%	Lost
