= Jill P. Carter =

American politician (born 1964)

Jill Carter
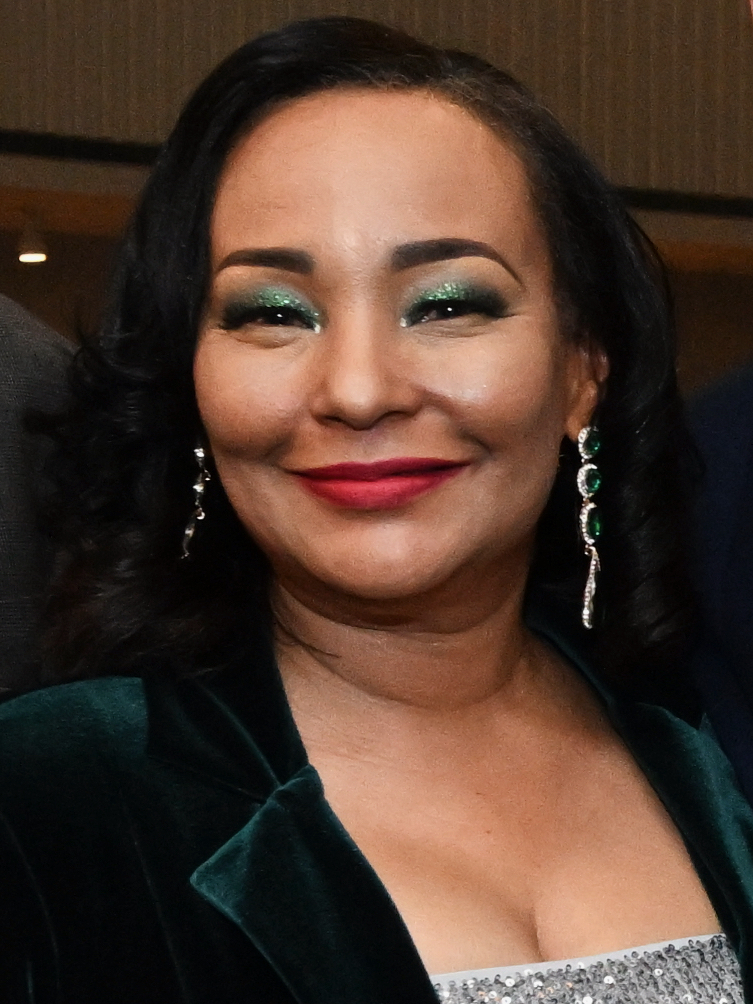

Member of the Maryland Senate from the 41st district
- In office May 4, 2018 – January 3, 2025
- Appointed by: Larry Hogan
- Preceded by: Nathaniel T. Oaks
- Succeeded by: Dalya Attar

Member of the Maryland House of Delegates from the 41st district
- In office January 8, 2003 – January 2, 2017 Serving with Nathaniel T. Oaks, Samuel I. Rosenberg
- Preceded by: Wendell Phillips
- Succeeded by: Bilal Ali

Personal details
- Born: June 18, 1964 (age 62) Baltimore, Maryland, U.S.
- Party: Democratic
- Relatives: Walter P. Carter (father)
- Education: Loyola University Maryland (BA); University of Baltimore (JD)
- Website: Campaign website Official website

Jill Priscilla Carter (born June 18, 1964) is an American politician and attorney who was a member of the Maryland Senate from 2018 to 2025, representing the 41st district in Baltimore. She previously represented the district in the Maryland House of Delegates from 2003 until her resignation in 2017.

== Early life and education ==
Carter is the daughter of the late Walter P. Carter, a civil rights activist and leader in the desegregation movement in Maryland in the 1960s and early 1970s. Her mother, Zerita Joy Carter, was a public school teacher specializing in Early Childhood Education. Carter graduated Western High School in Baltimore. Carter received her B.A. in English from Loyola College in Maryland in 1988 and a Juris Doctor from the University of Baltimore School of Law in 1992.

== Career ==
After graduating from the University of Baltimore, Carter served as a clerk to Baltimore City Circuit Court Judge Kenneth L. Johnson until 1993, afterwards working at various law firms before practicing law as a sole practitioner in 1998. In the same year, she also founded the Walter P. Carter Foundation.

== Political involvement ==
Carter has been involved in politics since she was young, when she campaigned for Parren Mitchell.

=== Maryland House of Delegates ===
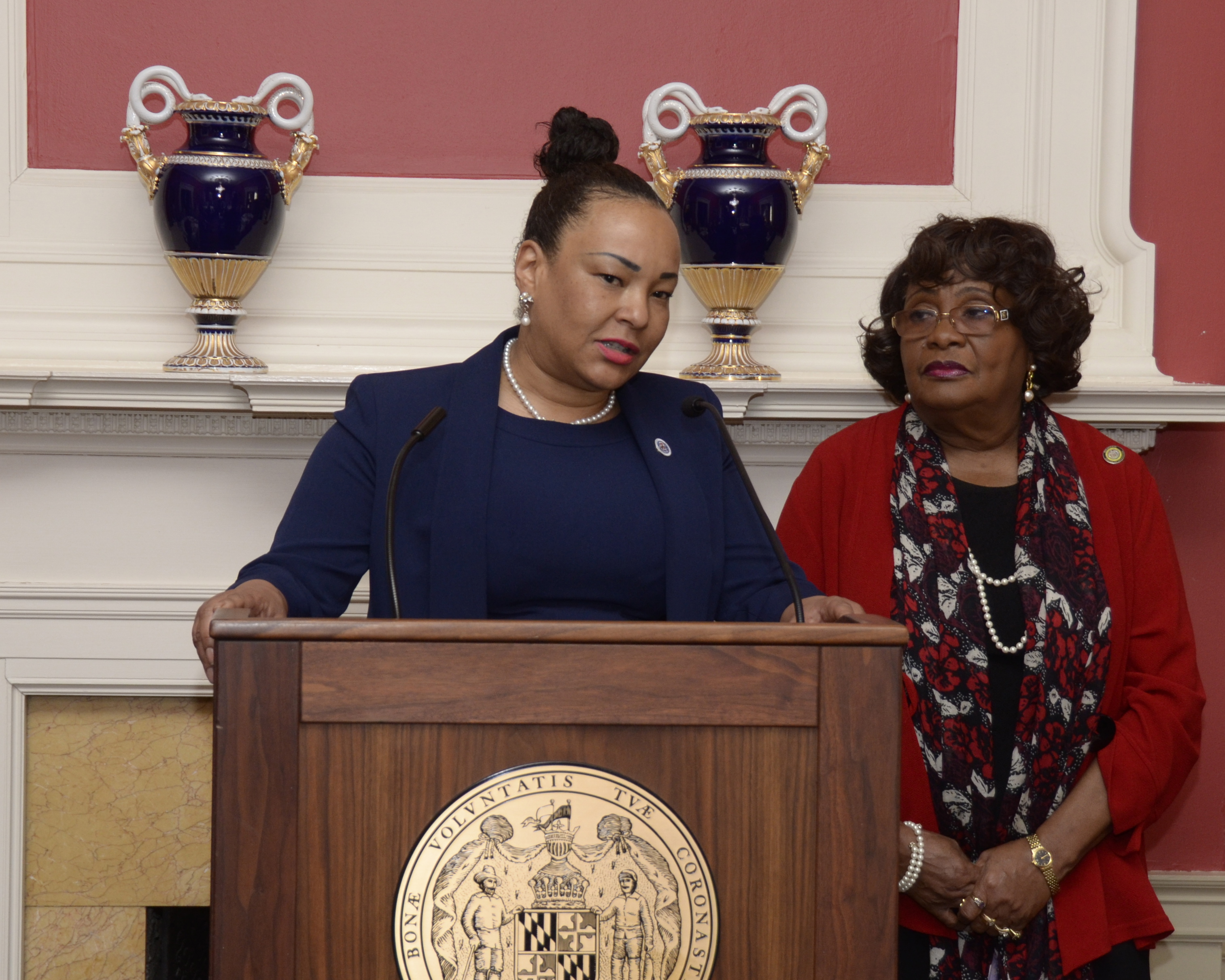
Carter speaks at the Legislative Black Caucus of Maryland breakfast, 2015

In 2002, Carter ran for the Maryland House of Delegates in District 41. She won the Democratic primary in September 2002, placing first with 18.2 percent and ousting incumbent state delegate Wendell F. Phillips. She won the general election and was sworn in on January 8, 2003. During her tenure in the House of Delegates, she was a member of the Judiciary Committee.

Carter has often been referred to as a lone voice in the wilderness for her challenges to established politicians on matters of adequate housing for the poor, lead poisoning of children, to adequately fund public education, both in the legislature, and in the Circuit Court for Baltimore City, and, in 2007, calling for a special session of the legislature to deal with the BGE utility rate increase.

In 2016, Carter served as a delegate to the Democratic National Convention, pledged to U.S. Senator Bernie Sanders. Following the convention, she endorsed Democratic nominee Hillary Clinton, saying that the prospect of a Trump presidency left her with no other option.

On December 30, 2016, Carter resigned from the Maryland House of Delegates to become the director of the Baltimore Office of Civil Rights and Wage Enforcement under Baltimore mayor Catherine Pugh. In this capacity, she handled citizens' law enforcement-related complaints and oversaw the implementation of the Civilian Review Board.

=== 2007 Baltimore mayoral campaign ===
On January 16, 2007, Carter announced her candidacy in the 2007 Baltimore mayoral election, seeking to succeed Martin O'Malley following his election as governor of Maryland. Her platform included promises to replace the entire police command staff within the Baltimore Police Department, increase the city's education funding to 20 percent of its budget, and creating an advisory panel of former police commissioners. Carter was defeated by incumbent mayor Sheila Dixon in the Democratic primary on September 11, 2007, placing fourth with 2.8 percent of the vote.

=== Maryland Senate ===
In February 2018, Carter filed to run for the Maryland Senate in District 41, challenging incumbent state senator Nathaniel T. Oaks, who had been indicted on federal corruption charges. In the primary election, she sought to position herself as an outsider and an "independent voice" in the legislature, citing her participation in the "Take a Hike, Mike" rally outside the Maryland State House opposing Senate president Thomas V. Miller Jr. Her campaign was backed by Catherine Pugh, Bernard C. Young, and various local pastors and labor unions.

2018 Democratic primary results by precinct Carter: 40–50%; 50–60%; 60–70%; 70–80%; 80–90%; Merrill: 40–50%; 50–60%; 60–70%; 70–80%

After Oaks resigned from the state senate in March 2018, Carter applied and was nominated alongside central committee member Joyce J. Smith by the Baltimore City Democratic Central Committee to fill the remainder of his term. She was appointed by Governor Larry Hogan on April 30, 2018, and sworn in on May 4 after resigning as director of the Office of Civil Rights and Wage Enforcement. She won the Democratic primary in June 2018, defeating J. D. Merrill, the son-in-law of former Governor Martin O'Malley with 54.9 percent of the vote.

Carter was a member of the Judicial Proceedings Committee.

In December 2024, Carter announced that she would resign from the Maryland Senate on January 3, 2025, after Governor Wes Moore appointed her to the Maryland State Board of Contract Appeals. She backed state delegate Malcolm Ruff to succeed her in the Senate; however, the Baltimore City Democratic Central Committee voted to nominate state delegate Dalya Attar to the position in January 2025. After Ruff launched a primary challenge to Attar in the 2026 Maryland Senate election, Carter supported Ruff and frequently commented on the race online. In May 2025, she made a Facebook post suggesting that leaders of the Orthodox Jewish community were working to "control the politics" of a majority-Black legislative district, which was condemned as antisemitic by The Baltimore Sun editorial board and by attorney Jay Bernstein. Carter defended her online comments, saying that they were not antisemitic but a legitimate criticism of political activities, citing a 2022 slate for the Democratic Central Committee that included only members of the Orthodox community and a push by rabbinical leaders to encourage Orthodox voters to change their political party affiliation to vote in closed primary races.

=== 2020 7th congressional district elections ===
On November 18, 2019, Carter announced her candidacy in the 2020 Maryland's 7th congressional district special election to succeed U.S. Representative Elijah Cummings after his death in October 2019. During the Democratic primary, she sought to position herself a progressive, running on a platform that included Medicare for All, the Green New Deal, and ending U.S. involvement in foreign wars. She was defeated in the Democratic primary by former U.S. Representative Kweisi Mfume, placing third with 16 percent of the vote. Following her defeat, she said she would run in the regular election for the district, in which she again placed third with 8.7 percent of the vote.

== Political positions ==
=== Criminal justice and policing ===
Prior to her re-election in 2006, she became a vocal critic of then mayor (and later Governor) Martin O'Malley's "failed policing policies". She posited that the so-labeled, zero tolerance, arrest strategy failed to cause significant reduction in a soaring crime rate in Baltimore City, but, rather, pressured police officers to make tens of thousands of arrests that did not produce criminal charges. She also called for a federal investigation into Baltimore Police Department practices.

In 2014, Carter introduced "Christopher's Law", a bill named for Baltimore County teen Christopher Brown, who died after being tackled by a police officer in 2012, that would require police officers to be trained in CPR. The bill passed and was signed into law by Governor O'Malley.

During the 2019 legislative session, Carter introduced legislation to limit when employers could ask about a job applicant's criminal record. The bill passed and became law after the legislature overrode Governor Larry Hogan's veto. She also introduced "Anton's Law", a bill that reformed the Maryland Public Information Act, to require transparency in investigations of complaints against law enforcement officers.

Carter was a vocal critic against a 2019 bill that would allow Johns Hopkins University to establish its own private police force, and was one of two state senators to vote against the bill in the Maryland Senate. In 2021, amid the George Floyd protests, she called for hearings on the repeal of the JHU police authorization bill. In July 2021, after JHU announced that it would move forward with its plans to create a private police force, Carter called the university's decision a "terrible miscalculation" that was "tone deaf" to the concerns raised by students, faculty, and community members.

In 2020, Carter voted against the Violent Firearms Offenders Act, a bill introduced by Governor Hogan to strengthen penalties on gun offenders, criticizing it as "more of the same old tough-on-crime mentality that has failed to reduce crime over the long term". She also introduced a bill to increase state funding for violence intervention programs to at least $3 million annually, which passed but was vetoed by Hogan; the legislature overrode his veto during the 2021 legislative session.

During the 2021 legislative session, Carter introduced legislation to repeal the Law Enforcement Officers' Bill of Rights. She voted against the bill in committee after a provision allowing police departments to hand disciplinary decisions over to an independent civilian oversight board was removed. The bill passed and became law after the legislature overrode Governor Hogan's veto of the bill. She also reintroduced Anton's Law, which passed and became law; and introduced another bill to implement a statewide police use of force policy; and supported a bill to limit no-knock warrants.

In 2022, Carter introduced a bill that would reform the state's juvenile sentencing rules, including a ban on confinement for first-time misdemeanor offenses unless a crime involved a gun, and prohibited police from interrogating children without first allowing them to speak to an attorney. The bill passed and became law without Governor Hogan's signature. She also introduced a bill to require police officers convicted of a crime committed while on duty to forfeit all or part of their pensions.

During the 2023 legislative session, Carter introduced a bill that would require private security guards to be licensed by the state, and establish minimum training standards for security agencies. The bill passed and was signed into law by Governor Wes Moore. She also introduced a bill that would repeal a law that automatically charges minors as adults with serious crimes, which failed to move out of committee.

=== Education ===
During the 2004 legislative session, Carter introduced a bill to expand the Baltimore school board from nine members to thirteen, including five appointed members and seven elected members.

=== Gun control ===
In March 2013, Carter said she supported Governor Martin O'Malley's bill to ban assault-type rifles and require a license to purchase a handgun.

In April 2016, after the Baltimore police shot a 14-year-old boy carrying a BB gun that resembled a pistol, Carter introduced legislation to ban the manufacture and sale of imitation guns.

During the 2023 legislative session, Carter opposed an Ivan Bates-backed bill to increase penalties for illegal gun possession. During debate on the bill, she introduced an amendment to allow people convicted on illegal gun possession charges to apply for probation before judgment, which initially passed before being removed from the bill following a motion for reconsideration.

=== Health care ===
During the 2009 legislative session, Carter introduced legislation to prohibit the closure of the Walter P Carter Center psychiatric hospital.

Carter supports Medicare for All. In 2020, she and state delegate Gabriel Acevero introduced a bill to establish a universal single-payer health care system in Maryland.

=== Marijuana ===
In 2019, Carter voted against a bill to loosen ownership limits on marijuana dispensaries, expressing concern that the bill did not consider the state's equity goals.

In 2021, Carter introduced a bill that would decriminalize the possession of marijuana paraphernalia, and later said she was "heartbroken" after the bill did not come up for a veto override vote following Governor Larry Hogan's veto. During the 2022 legislative session, Carter introduced legislation to legalize recreational marijuana. She voted against a bill establishing a ballot referendum to legalize recreational marijuana in Maryland, saying that she believed it was more important to "hammer out details of licensing and community reparation funds". In 2023, after voters approved of Question 4, Carter expressed concern with equity within the marijuana industry. She also introduced a bill to ban vehicle searches based on cannabis odor, which passed and became law without Governor Wes Moore's signature.

=== Social issues ===
In October 2002, Carter appeared in an ad to support Question P, a referendum to reduce the size of the Baltimore City Council.

During the 2011 legislative session, Carter co-sponsored the Civil Marriage Protection Act, which would legalize same-sex marriage in Maryland. However, she staged a walkout during a committee vote on the bill, which she said was to draw attention to "more important, or at least equally important" issues of education funding cuts in Baltimore and child custody in divorces. She did not co-sponsor the bill when it was reintroduced in 2012, but voted for it when it came up for a vote in the House. During the 2023 legislative session, she introduced a bill to prohibit discrimination against transgender and intersex individuals in state prisons.

In June 2015, Carter signed onto a letter calling for the renaming of Robert E. Lee Park. In 2016, Carter introduced a bill to destroy the Roger B. Taney Monument at the Maryland State House. She later amended the bill to send the statue to the Maryland State Archives.

During the 2019 legislative session, Carter introduced a bill to prohibit University of Maryland Medical System board members from holding no-bid contracts with the system. The bill helped prompt the Baltimore Sun's investigation, which found that nine UMMS board members, including Baltimore mayor Catherine Pugh, had business deals worth hundreds of thousands of dollars with the hospital network, the bill unanimously passed the Maryland General Assembly and was signed into law by Governor Larry Hogan. After Pugh resigned amid the UMMS contracts controversy, Carter said that she had made a "mistake" in endorsing Pugh in 2016.

In April 2019, Carter joined Republicans in voting against a bill to eliminate the statute of limitations on child sexual assault lawsuits, causing it to deadlock in committee. She later voted against the bill on the Senate floor, which she called a difficult vote but added that she felt that "our law in its current form is enough".

== Electoral history ==
Maryland House of Delegates District 41 Democratic primary election, 2002
Party	Candidate	Votes	%
Democratic	Jill P. Carter	8,958	18.2
Democratic	Nathaniel T. Oaks (incumbent)	7,921	16.1
Democratic	Samuel I. Rosenberg (incumbent)	7,810	15.8
Democratic	Wendell F. Phillips (incumbent)	7,575	15.3
Democratic	Marshall Pittman	4,109	8.3
Democratic	Mark E. Hughes	3,599	7.3
Democratic	David Maurice Smallwood	3,013	6.1
Democratic	Alan A. Abramowitz	2,592	7.3
Democratic	Mark E. Hughes	3,599	7.3
Democratic	Tara Andrews	1,197	2.4
Democratic	Nathaniel Bland	1,197	2.4
Democratic	Deborah B. Ramsey	1,000	2.0
Democratic	Ed Potillo	324	0.7

Maryland House of Delegates District 41 election, 2002
Party	Candidate	Votes	%
Democratic	Jill P. Carter	22,643	35.2
Democratic	Samuel I. Rosenberg (incumbent)	21,146	32.9
Democratic	Nathaniel T. Oaks (incumbent)	20,335	31.6
Write-in		204	0.3

Maryland House of Delegates District 41 election, 2006
Party	Candidate	Votes	%
Democratic	Jill P. Carter (incumbent)	24,189	33.7
Democratic	Samuel I. Rosenberg (incumbent)	21,751	30.3
Democratic	Nathaniel T. Oaks (incumbent)	20,570	28.6
Republican	Tony Asa	5,166	7.2
Write-in		129	0.2

Baltimore mayoral Democratic primary, 2007
Party	Candidate	Votes	%
Democratic	Sheila Dixon (incumbent)	54,381	63.1
Democratic	Keiffer Mitchell Jr.	20,376	23.7
Democratic	Andrey Bundley	6,543	7.6
Democratic	Jill P. Carter	2,372	2.8
Democratic	A. Robert Kaufman	885	1.0
Democratic	Mike Schaefer	762	0.9
Democratic	Frank M. Conaway Sr. (withdrawn)	533	0.6
Democratic	Phillip Brown	273	0.3

Maryland House of Delegates District 41 election, 2010
Party	Candidate	Votes	%
Democratic	Jill P. Carter (incumbent)	24,985	33.5
Democratic	Samuel I. Rosenberg (incumbent)	22,654	30.4
Democratic	Nathaniel T. Oaks (incumbent)	21,931	29.4
Republican	Mark Ehrlichmann	4,723	6.3
Write-in		207	0.3

Maryland House of Delegates District 41 election, 2014
Party	Candidate	Votes	%
Democratic	Jill P. Carter (incumbent)	24,038	35.1
Democratic	Samuel I. "Sandy" Rosenberg (incumbent)	22,284	32.6
Democratic	Nathaniel T. Oaks (incumbent)	21,551	31.5
Write-in		516	0.7

Maryland Senate District 41 Democratic primary election, 2018
Party	Candidate	Votes	%
Democratic	Jill P. Carter (incumbent)	10,067	54.9
Democratic	J.D. Merrill	7,097	38.7
Democratic	Nathaniel T. Oaks	1,168	6.4

Maryland Senate District 41 election, 2018
Party	Candidate	Votes	%
Democratic	Jill P. Carter (incumbent)	33,284	98.2
Write-in		616	1.8

Maryland's 7th congressional district Democratic special primary election, 2020
Party	Candidate	Votes	%
Democratic	Kweisi Mfume	31,415	43.0
Democratic	Maya Rockeymoore Cummings	12,524	17.1
Democratic	Jill P. Carter	11,708	16.0
Democratic	Terri Hill	5,439	7.4
Democratic	F. Michael Higginbotham	3,245	4.4
Democratic	Harry Spikes	2,572	3.5
Democratic	Saafir Rabb	1,327	1.8
Democratic	Jay Jalisi	1,257	1.7
Democratic	Talmadge Branch	810	1.1
Democratic	Mark Gosnell	579	0.8
Democratic	T. Dan Baker	377	0.5
Democratic	Charles Stokes	297	0.4
Democratic	Paul V. Konka	251	0.3
Democratic	Darryl Gonzalez	245	0.3
Democratic	Alicia D. Brown	180	0.2
Democratic	Leslie Grant	176	0.2
Democratic	Anthony Carter	155	0.2
Democratic	Jay Fred Cohen	150	0.2
Democratic	Matko Lee Chullin	79	0.1
Democratic	Charles U. Smith	75	0.1
Democratic	Adrian Petrus	60	0.1
Democratic	Nathaniel M. Costley Sr.	49	0.1
Democratic	Jermyn Davidson	31	0.0
Democratic	Dan L. Hiegel	31	0.0
Total votes		73,032	100.0

Maryland's 7th congressional district Democratic primary election, 2020
Party	Candidate	Votes	%
Democratic	Kweisi Mfume (incumbent)	113,061	74.3
Democratic	Maya Rockeymoore Cummings	15,208	10.0
Democratic	Jill P. Carter	13,237	8.7
Democratic	Alicia D. Brown	1,841	1.2
Democratic	Charles Stokes	1,356	0.9
Democratic	T. Dan Baker	1,141	0.7
Democratic	Jay Jalisi	1,056	0.7
Democratic	Harry Spikes	1,040	0.7
Democratic	Saafir Rabb	948	0.6
Democratic	Mark Gosnell	765	0.5
Democratic	Darryl Gonzalez	501	0.3
Democratic	Jeff Woodard	368	0.2
Democratic	Gary Schuman	344	0.2
Democratic	Michael D. Howard Jr.	327	0.2
Democratic	Michael Davidson	298	0.2
Democratic	Dan L. Hiegel	211	0.1
Democratic	Charles U. Smith	189	0.1
Democratic	Matko Lee Chullin	187	0.1
Democratic	Adrian Petrus	170	0.1
Total votes		152,248	100.0

Maryland Senate District 41 election, 2022
Party	Candidate	Votes	%
Democratic	Jill P. Carter (incumbent)	29,882	98.2
Write-in		547	1.8
