= Edmondson-Westside High School =

Public high school in Maryland, USA

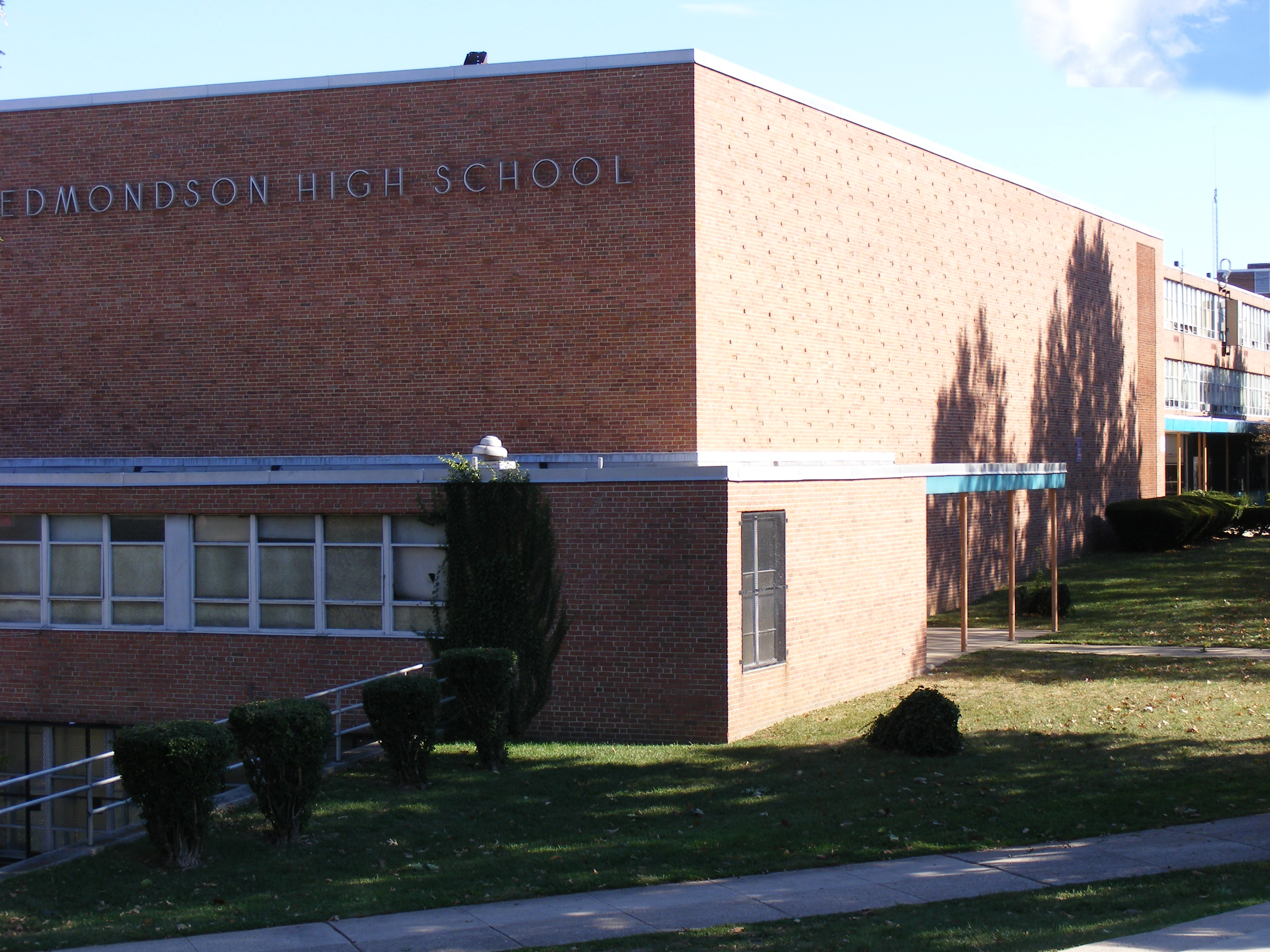

Location
- 501 Athol Avenue, (Edmondson Building), Baltimore, Maryland 21229; United States; 39°17′29″N 76°41′16″W

Information
- School type: Public, vo-tech, magnet
- Motto: "Excellence Demands Sacrifice"
- Founded: 1955
- School district: Baltimore City Public Schools (BCPS), established 1829
- Superintendent: Sonja B. Santelises [CEO]
- School number: 400
- Grades: 9–12
- Enrollment: 975 (2014)
- Area: Urban
- Colors: Red and white
- Mascot: Redskins (1955–2002); The Red Storm (2002–present)
- Team name: Redstorm
- Website: www.edmondson-westside.org

Edmondson-Westside High School is a public high school located in the southwest area known as Edmondson Village of Baltimore, Maryland, United States. The school is made up of two buildings, the Edmondson Building (located on Athol Avenue) which is used primarily for Academic Studies, and the Westside Building (located on Edmondson Avenue/U.S. Route 40) which is used for Vocational and Technical Studies such as Culinary Arts, Child Care, Automotive, Media Technology, Computer Programming and Nursing. The Edmondson High building opened in September 1955, originally as Edmondson High School, a co-educational neighborhood comprehensive high school. The Westside Building several city blocks away, known originally as the Westside Skills Center, an independent separate school within the BCPS system, opened up in September 1980 to expand the high school, adding the former closed suburban branch of a local department store. At a later date the two schools were merged to form Edmondson-Westside (EWHS).

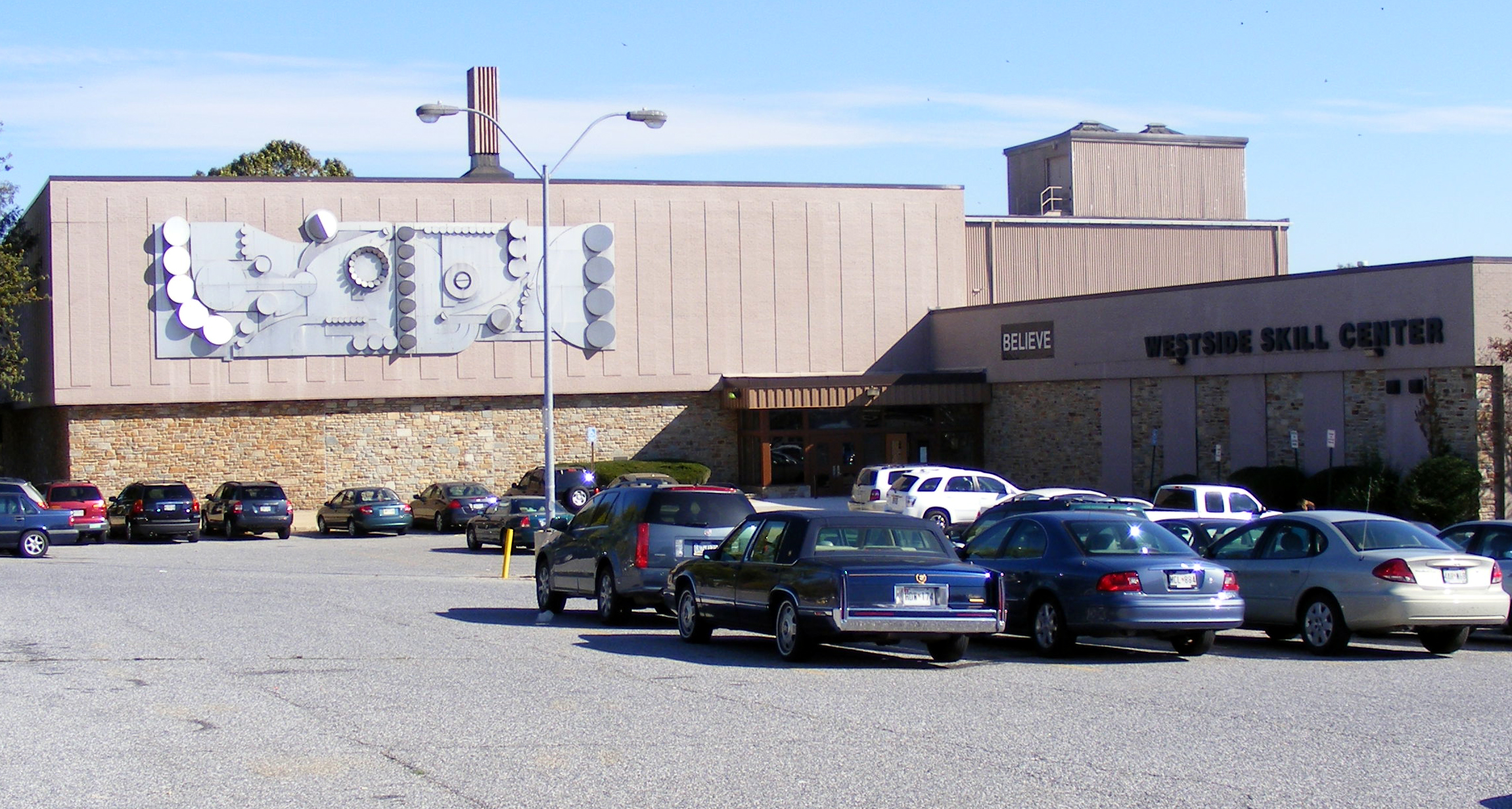
Westside Building of Edmondson-Westside High School, on Edmondson Avenue (U.S. Route 40), formerly a department store, then renovated as the Westside Skills Center, merged later to form EWHS.

== Sports ==
Edmondson's Redstorm (formerly known as Redskins) hold many athletic championships around the city. In the 2006–2007 academic year, their varsity football team were the 2A State Champions and the varsity wrestling team were the city champions.

The old Edmondson High School "Red Skins" teams of the 1960s dominated the Maryland high school sports scene with the football team being the undefeated state champions in the 'A' Conference of the old public-private league Maryland Scholastic Association (existed 1919–1992) from 1963 to 1968.

Graduates of those teams won scholarships to many prestigious schools such as the U.S. Naval Academy at Annapolis, U.S. Military Academy at West Point, and at The Pennsylvania State University (Penn State).

While the football team enjoyed their undefeated win streak, other sports such as basketball and swimming won State championship after championship.

Edmondson's lacrosse program under the direction of Augie Waibel and Lon Russ, fielded one of the first integrated high school Lacrosse teams in the nation. The teams received many honors and many of the black youth were recruited to play at the college level where they did well.

The class of 2005 was the last to graduate that had used the Redskins as the school mascot. That class is often nicknamed "The Last of the Redskins."

Edmondson-Westside drumline at the 2008 Morgan State University homecoming parade

== Notable alumni ==
- Keandre Cook (born 1997), basketball player for Hapoel Tel Aviv in the Israeli Basketball Premier League
- Emory Elliott (1942–2009), Ph.D., Distinguished Professor, University of California, Riverside
- Stanton Kidd (born 1992), basketball player for Hapoel Jerusalem in the Israeli Basketball Premier League
- John Miller, Baltimore Orioles pitcher
- Nathaniel T. Oaks, member Maryland House of Delegates, 41st district
- Charlie Pittman, former NFL running back
- Warren Powers, former NFL defensive end, Denver Broncos
- Marvin Webster, former NBA player
