= Nathaniel T. Oaks =

American politician

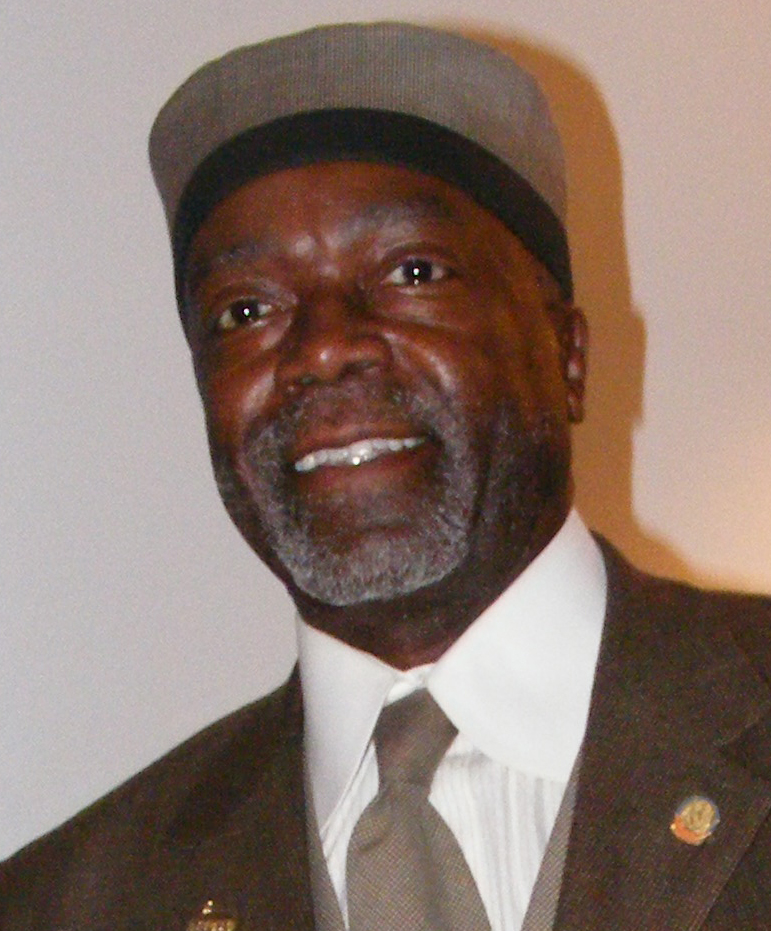

Member of the Maryland Senate from the 41st district
- In office February 10, 2017 – March 29, 2018
- Preceded by: Lisa Gladden
- Succeeded by: Jill P. Carter

Member of the Maryland House of Delegates from the 41st district
- In office January 11, 1995 – February 10, 2017
- Preceded by: Samuel M. Parham
- Succeeded by: Angela Gibson
- In office January 12, 1983 – January 10, 1989
- Preceded by: Walter R. Dean, Jr.
- Succeeded by: Samuel M. Parham

Personal details
- Born: October 19, 1946 (age 79) Baltimore, Maryland, U.S.
- Party: Democratic
- Occupation: Insurance agent

Nathaniel T. Oaks (born October 19, 1946) is an American politician from Baltimore City, Maryland. He was a longtime member of the Maryland General Assembly, serving as a member of the Maryland House of Delegates from 1983 to 1989 and again from 1995 to February 2017, when he resigned to take a seat in the Maryland State Senate. Oaks remained in the state Senate until March 29, 2018, when he resigned from office on the same day he pleaded guilty to federal corruption charges.

== Background ==
Born in Baltimore, Maryland, Oaks attended Edmondson High School, the University of Baltimore, Towson State College and graduated from Morgan State University with a Bachelor of Science in business in 1974.

== Maryland legislature ==
=== First arrest ===
Oaks was a member of the House of Delegates from 1983 to 1989 when he automatically forfeited his seat after being convicted of theft charges for $10,000 for double-billing expenses to the State in his official capacity and to his campaign fund.

After a losing bid to regain office in 1990, Oaks was re-elected in 1994 when several incumbent delegates retired.

=== Legislative notes ===
- Co-sponsored HB 860 (Baltimore City Public Schools Construction and Revitalization Act of 2013). Signed by the Governor on May 16, 2013, the new law approved 1.1 billion dollars to construct new schools in Baltimore City.

== Election results ==
- 2006 Primary Race for Maryland House of Delegates – District 41

Voters to choose three:

Name	Votes	Percent	Outcome
Jill P. Carter, Dem.	13,196	31.2%	Won
Samuel I. Rosenberg, Dem.	9,215	21.8%	Won
Nathaniel T. Oaks, Dem.	9,189	21.7%	Won
Wendall Phillips	6,480	15.3%	Lost
Kevin Hargrave	2,095	5.0%	Lost
Karen M. Ferguson	2,116	5.0%	Lost

=== Appointed senator ===
Governor Larry Hogan appointed Oaks to the Maryland State Senate in 2017 when Lisa Gladden retired due to illness.

== Second arrest and resignation ==
In May 2017, State Senator Oaks was indicted in U.S. District Court on nine counts of wire fraud, fraud, and bribery in connection with an influence-peddling scheme. In November 2017, Oaks was additionally charged with obstruction of justice, relating to "an allegation that Oaks sabotaged another investigation by tipping off the target."

On March 29, 2018, Oaks resigned his state Senate seat, and hours later pleaded guilty to two wire fraud charges and admitted that he had made "corrupt use of his office in a bribery scheme." The remaining charges against him were dismissed.

Although federal prosecutors asked for a 5 year prison sentence, on July 17, 2018, Oaks was formally sentenced to three and a half years in prison. U.S. District Judge Richard Bennett found Oaks guilty on one count of wire fraud and one count of honest services wire fraud after he signed a plea agreement early 2018 confirming he had accepted a bribe from a disguised FBI informant and agreed to help defraud a federal housing agency. Oaks was ordered to pay a $30,000 fine and perform 80 hours of community service. It was reported in June 2020 that Oaks was granted compassionate release from prison due to poor health amid the COVID-19 pandemic after serving about half of his sentence.
