= Baltimore Brew =

Baltimore, Maryland news website

- Website type: News website
- Available in: English
- Headquarters: Baltimore, Maryland
- Founder: Fern Shen
- Website: www.baltimorebrew.com
- Current status: Active

Baltimore Brew is a news website devoted to local news about Baltimore, Maryland.

== Overview ==
Founded by Fern Shen, a former reporter for The Washington Post, the Brew has been noted for its in depth reporting of local issues.

In addition to Shen, several former veteran reporters from mainstream publications, such as The Baltimore Sun, write for the Brew.
