= Lesley Lopez =

American politician (born 1983)

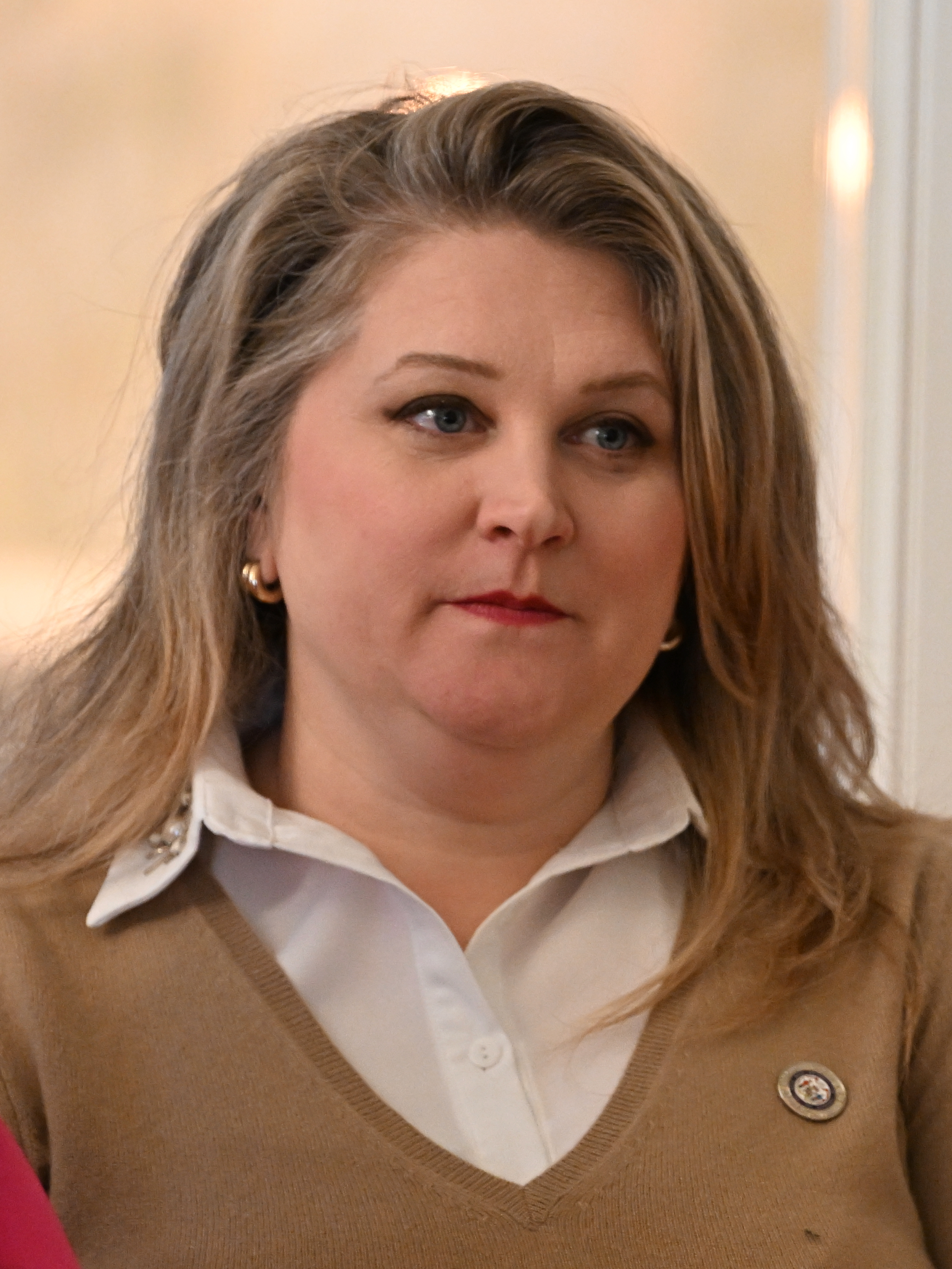

Member of the Maryland House of Delegates from the 39th district
- Incumbent
- Assumed office January 9, 2019 Serving with Gabriel Acevero, W. Gregory Wims
- Preceded by: Charles E. Barkley

Personal details
- Born: Lesley Jeanne Lopez; November 28, 1983 (age 42) Paget Parish, Bermuda
- Party: Democratic
- Spouse: Richard Kelly (m. 2018)
- Children: 2
- Education: University of California, San Diego (BA); George Washington University (MPA)
- Website: Campaign website

Lesley Jeanne Lopez (born November 28, 1983) is an American politician who is a member of the Maryland House of Delegates from District 39. A member of the Democratic Party, she unsuccessfully ran for the U.S. House of Representatives in Maryland's 6th congressional district in 2024, losing to April McClain Delaney in the Democratic primary election.

== Early life and education ==
The oldest of three siblings, Lopez was born in Paget Parish, Bermuda, while her mother Patricia was serving on active duty in the U.S. Navy. She grew up in Southern California in a blended family. As a child she was adopted by her stepfather, Emsley Lopez, also a naval officer. Her paternal grandparents migrated to the United States from the Philippines.

Lopez attended schools in San Bernardino, California. While in elementary school, she survived a school shooting in which a man from a neighboring apartment complex began shooting at her classmates. She later attended the University of California, San Diego, where she earned a B.A. in political science, and George Washington University, where she earned an M.P.A. in management.

== Career ==
=== Early career ===
After graduating, Lopez worked as a journalist for ABC News's This Week with George Stephanopoulos, BBC, CNN, America's Most Wanted, and the Eurovision Song Contest. She also worked as an adjunct professor of communications at George Washington University, where she became a member of Service Employees International Union Local 500.

Lopez first became involved with politics while working with immigrant families. She served as the press secretary for U.S. Representative Henry Cuellar from 2008 to 2011, afterwards serving as the communications director for the Congressional Hispanic Caucus until 2013. In this capacity, she helped pass the Border Security, Economic Opportunity, and Immigration Modernization Act through the U.S. Senate and reauthorize the Violence Against Women Act, which was expanded to include protections for undocumented immigrants.

Lopez later worked as the communications director for various other organizations, including the National Immigration Forum, the Democratic Legislative Campaign Committee, and the US-China Business Council, from 2014 to 2017. Since 2017, she has worked as the chief communications director for Run for Something.

=== Maryland House of Delegates ===
In 2017, after state delegate Charles E. Barkley announced that he would run for the Montgomery County Council at-large district in 2018, Lopez filed to run for state delegate in District 39. She ran on a slate with state senator Nancy J. King and state delegates Kirill Reznik and Shane Robinson. Lopez won the Democratic primary election on June 27, 2018, placing first with 21.3 percent of the vote.

Lopez was sworn into the Maryland House of Delegates on January 9, 2019. She was a member of the Judiciary Committee from 2019 to 2022, afterwards serving on the Health and Government Operations Committee. Lopez ran for re-election in 2022, during which she formed a slate with union activist Clint Sobratti, who sought to unseat incumbent delegate Gabriel Acevero. All three incumbents, including Acevero, won the Democratic primary on July 19, 2022.

During the 2020 Democratic Party presidential primaries, Lopez endorsed U.S. Senator Elizabeth Warren.

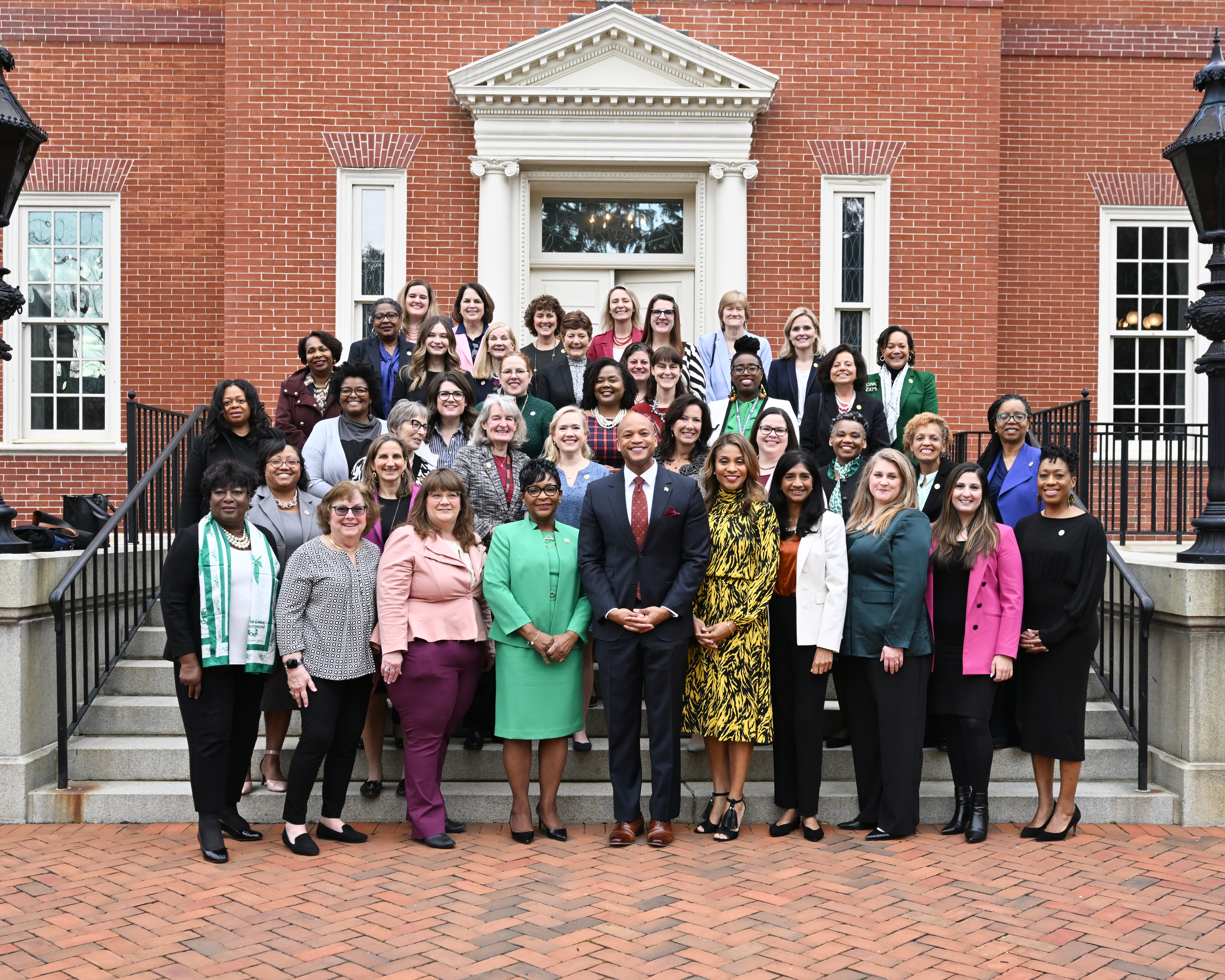
Lopez was president of the Women's Legislative Caucus of Maryland (pictured) from 2022 to 2023

In March 2022, Lopez was voted in as the president of the Women's Caucus of Maryland by a 50–12 vote, one year ahead of when she was due to become its president under the caucus's traditional order. In response, the 11 Republican members of the caucus resigned from the caucus in protest, later demanding it be renamed to the "Democrat Women's Caucus of Maryland". Lopez defended her election, saying in an interview with Maryland Matters that she "had some plans of what I wanted to do [as caucus president] when I moved up so I accelerated the timeline" and had approached state senator Adelaide Eckardt, a Republican, about joining her leadership team, but she declined. She had also sent handwritten notes to each of the members who had left the caucus. Republicans have since declined to rejoin the caucus, and have discussed forming their own.

=== 2024 congressional campaign ===
On June 1, 2023, she announced her candidacy for the U.S. House of Representatives in Maryland's 6th congressional district to succeed outgoing U.S. Representative David Trone. During the Democratic primary, she received endorsements from several members of the legislature and ran on a platform of gun safety, addressing the opioid crisis, and protecting reproductive rights. Lopez was unable to put together a robust campaign and was defeated by former National Telecommunications and Information Administration deputy administrator April McClain Delaney in the Democratic primary election on May 14, 2024, placing fifth with 4.6 percent of the vote.

== Political positions ==
=== Abortion ===
In May 2022, following the leak of a draft majority opinion for the U.S. Supreme Court case Dobbs v. Jackson Women's Health Organization, Lopez sent a letter on the behalf of the Women's Legislative Caucus of Maryland to Governor Larry Hogan, asking that he release the $3.5 million in funds to train abortion care providers as part of the Abortion Care Access Act. Hogan denied her request, effectively delaying the law's implementation until July 2023.

During her 2024 congressional campaign, Lopez said that she would support codifying the Roe v. Wade decision on the federal level.

During the 2025 legislative session, Lopez introduced legislation to create a $25 million grant fund to expand abortion access for uninsured or underinsured individuals. The bill passed and was signed into law by Governor Wes Moore, but was blocked from going into effect by federal health officials, who said the program "exceeds permissible use" of the fees collected by the Affordable Care Act.

During the 2026 legislative session, Lopez introduced a bill that would require hospitals to provide emergency abortion care when needed to stabilize a patient.

=== Education ===
In September 2019, Lopez joined Maryland Attorney General Brian Frosh and 43 other members of the Maryland General Assembly in co-signing a letter to U.S. Education Secretary Betsy DeVos asking for information about her implementation of the federal Public Service Loan Forgiveness program.

During the 2021 legislative session, Lopez endorsed a bill to expand collective bargaining rights to employees at Maryland's 16 community colleges.

In April 2024, Lopez expressed concerns with efforts to ban books in public schools and libraries and called for federal protections against book bans. She also supported increasing funding for local school districts and teachers, and hiring more support personnel in schools.

=== Gun policy ===
In August 2019, Lopez said she opposed the Maryland State Police's decision to repeal limits for concealed carry permits for business owners, pointing out that the decision followed mass shootings in El Paso, Texas, and Dayton, Ohio.

In 2020, Lopez introduced a bill requiring firearms to be stored in an area where a minor could not gain access to it.

During the 2021 legislative session, Lopez introduced legislation to ban privately made firearms. The bill failed to pass out of committee. She reintroduced the bill in 2022, during which it passed and became law without Governor Hogan's signature. Following the bill's passage, Lopez was invited to the White House by President Joe Biden, where he announced a new United States Department of Justice rule regulating privately made firearms.

=== Health care ===
During the 2026 legislative session, Lopez introduced a bill that would require Medicaid and other state programs to cover the cost of monitoring devices for individuals with a higher chance of elopement.

=== Immigration ===
During the 2026 legislative session, Lopez introduced a bill that would prohibit state employees from knowingly aiding U.S. Immigration and Customs Enforcement unless presented with an official judicial warrant.

=== Israel ===
Lopez supports a two-state solution to the Israeli–Palestinian conflict. In October 2023, amid the Gaza war, Lopez said she supported Israel's right to defend itself and called for humanitarian aid to Palestine.

=== Policing reform ===
In June 2020, Lopez pledged to stop taking campaign contributions from the Fraternal Order of Police. During the 2023 legislative session, Lopez introduced a bill to allow municipalities to establish police accountability boards.

=== Social issues ===
In 2019, Lopez introduced a bill to expand the state's child pornography laws to include lascivious behavior and computer-generated images. The bill unanimously passed the Maryland General Assembly.

During the 2023 legislative session, Lopez introduced a bill prohibiting the Maryland Department of Public Safety and Correctional Services correctional staff from discriminating against gender nonconforming individuals and would allow these individuals to be housed in a facility that aligns with their gender identity.

During the 2026 legislative session, Lopez introduced a bill that would expand the state's 311 system statewide through the use of AI chatbots and voicebots.

== Personal life ==
Lopez is married to her husband Richard Kelly, an app developer at Capital One. The couple married on September 23, 2018, in a ceremony at the Woodend Sanctuary. Together, they have two children.

== Electoral history ==
Maryland House of Delegates District 39 Democratic primary election, 2018
Party	Candidate	Votes	%
Democratic	Lesley J. Lopez	5,422	21.3
Democratic	Gabriel Acevero	5,116	20.1
Democratic	Kirill Reznik (incumbent)	5,088	20.0
Democratic	Shane Robinson (incumbent)	4,934	19.4
Democratic	Bobby Bartlett	2,487	9.8
Democratic	Andy Hoverman	1,281	5.0
Democratic	Clint Sobratti	1,139	4.5

Maryland House of Delegates District 39 election, 2018
Party	Candidate	Votes	%
Democratic	Gabriel Acevero	28,554	31.0
Democratic	Lesley J. Lopez	27,722	30.1
Democratic	Kirill Reznik (incumbent)	25,236	27.4
Republican	Verelyn Gibbs Watson	10,316	11.2
Write-in		324	0.4

Maryland House of Delegates District 39 election, 2022
Party	Candidate	Votes	%
Democratic	Lesley J. Lopez (incumbent)	27,722	33.3
Democratic	Gabriel Acevero (incumbent)	23,104	33.0
Democratic	Kirill Reznik (incumbent)	22,292	31.9
Write-in		1,259	1.8

Maryland's 6th congressional district Democratic primary results, 2024
Party	Candidate	Votes	%
Democratic	April McClain Delaney	22,985	40.4
Democratic	Joe Vogel	14,940	26.3
Democratic	Ashwani Jain	4,750	8.3
Democratic	Tekesha Martinez	3,992	7.0
Democratic	Lesley Lopez	2,600	4.6
Democratic	Laurie-Anne Sayles	1,845	3.2
Democratic	Destiny Drake West	1,086	1.9
Democratic	Mohammad Mozumder	1,005	1.7
Democratic	Joel Martin Rubin (withdrawn)	820	1.4
Democratic	Peter Choharis (withdrawn)	818	1.4
Democratic	Geoffrey Grammer (withdrawn)	651	1.1
Democratic	George Gluck	437	0.8
Democratic	Kiambo White	401	0.7
Democratic	Stephen McDow (withdrawn)	246	0.4
Democratic	Altimont Wilks	179	0.3
Democratic	Adrian Petrus	166	0.3
