= Amar Mukunda =

American politician (born 1992)

Member-elect of the Maryland Senate from the 39th district
- Assuming office January 13, 2027
- Succeeding: Nancy J. King

Personal details
- Born: December 8, 1992 (age 33)
- Party: Democratic
- Education: Amherst College (BS); Stanford University (MS)
- Website: Campaign website

Military service
- Branch: United States Army Reserve
- Rank: Combat engineer

Amar Mukunda (born December 8, 1992) is an American entrepreneur, U.S. Army Reserve combat engineer, and politician who is the member-elect of the Maryland Senate from the 39th district. He is a member of the Democratic Party.

== Early life and career ==
Mukunda was born on December 8, 1992, to Indian and Pakistani immigrants. His paternal grandfather emigrated from India to work on transit projects in Baltimore and Washington, D.C., including the construction of the Glenmont station. His mother fled conflict and corruption in Pakistan and settled in the area. His parents started a successful telecommunications company in the late 1980s, but became bankrupt after the 9/11 market crash and were forced to move multiple times before Mukunda graduated from high school.

Mukunda grew up in Montgomery County, Maryland, and graduated from Walt Whitman High School. While attending high school, he helped organize a student counter-protest against the Westboro Baptist Church, which planned to protest at the high school over its namesake, and volunteered for Barack Obama's 2008 presidential camapaign. He graduated from Amherst College magna cum laude in 2015, earning a Bachelor of Science degree in computer science and geology. From 2015 to 2016, he was a Fulbright Scholar, researching Kamusi and machine learning in Switzerland. Mukunda graduated from Stanford University in 2025, earning a Master of Science degree in energy and infrastructure engineering.

Mukunda is a combat engineer in the United States Army Reserve. From 2019 to 2023, he served as the assistant director of Roca Maryland, a community-based violence prevention program. In 2022, while working at Roca, he was a Bloomberg Fellow at Johns Hopkins Bloomberg School of Public Health, he researched gun violence and addition through a public health perspective.

== Maryland Senate ==
=== 2026 election ===
In September 2025, Mukunda announced that he would run for the Maryland House of Delegates in District 39. He withdrew his House of Delegates bid in November 2025, instead opting to run for the Maryland Senate, challenging Senate majority leader Nancy J. King.

During the Democratic primary, Mukunda ran to King's left, supporting universal healthcare, extending the Red Line to Germantown, and ending corporate political donations. He also received endorsements from the Maryland League of Conservation Voters, Maryland Sierra Club, and CASA in Action. Mukunda criticized King for trying repeatedly to primary state delegate Gabriel Acevero and for taking contributions from utility companies, and attacked leaders of the Maryland Senate for blocking bills relating to progressive issues, including curtails to federal immigration enforcement, funding for school meals, and mid-decade redistricting.

Mukunda defeated King in the Democratic primary on June 23, 2026, in an upset. He ran in the general election unopposed. Mukunda will be the first South Asian state senator in Maryland and the youngest current member of the Maryland Senate as of 2026. Mukunda was assigned to the Senate Judicial Proceedings Committee at the start of the 2027 legislative session.

== Personal life ==
Mukunda lives in Gaithersburg, Maryland. He is Muslim.
