= Nancy J. King =

American politician (born 1949)

Nancy King
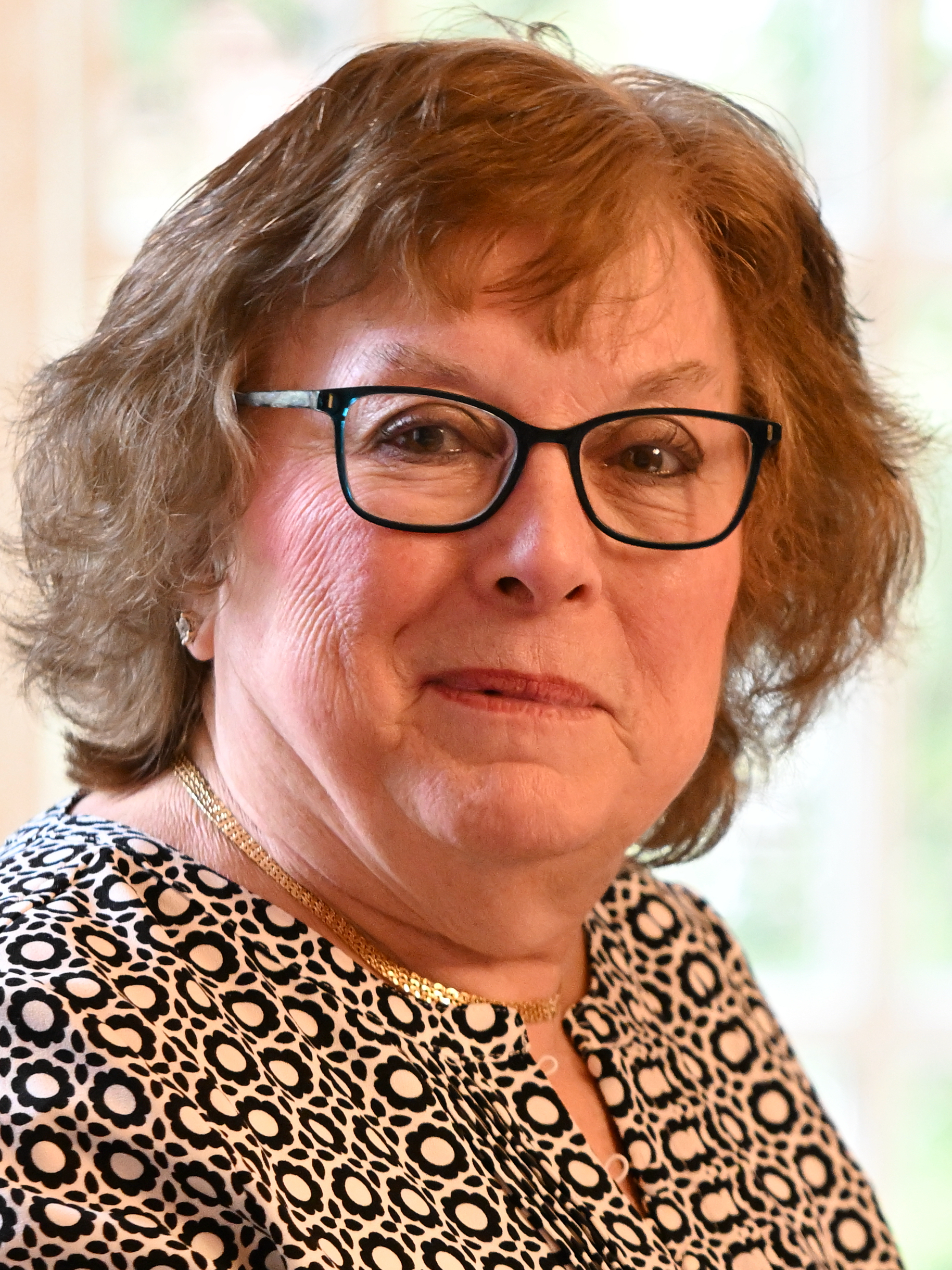

Majority Leader of the Maryland Senate
- Incumbent
- Assumed office January 8, 2020
- Preceded by: Guy Guzzone

Member of the Maryland Senate from the 39th district
- Incumbent
- Assumed office September 5, 2007
- Appointed by: Martin O'Malley
- Preceded by: Patrick Hogan

Member of the Maryland House of Delegates from the 39th district
- In office January 8, 2003 – September 5, 2007
- Preceded by: Paul H. Carlson
- Succeeded by: Kirill Reznik

Personal details
- Born: October 7, 1949 (age 77) Niagara Falls, New York, U.S.
- Party: Democratic
- Children: 3
- Education: Niagara County Community College (attended)

Nancy J. King (born October 7, 1949) is an American politician who is a member of the Maryland Senate from the 39th district since 2007. A member of the Democratic Party, she has served as the majority leader of the Maryland Senate since 2020. King previously represented the district in the Maryland House of Delegates from 2003 to 2007.

Born and raised in New York, King attended Niagara County Community College before moving to Maryland to work for her family's consulting and forensic engineering company. She began her political career as an appointed member of the Montgomery Village Foundation Board of Directors, later winning election to the Montgomery County Board of Education in 1994. She was elected to the Maryland House of Delegates in 2002 and appointed to the Maryland Senate in 2007, following the resignation of Patrick J. Hogan. In January 2020, King was appointed as the majority leader of the Maryland Senate. In 2026, King lost renomination in the Democratic primary to Amar Mukunda.

== Early life and education ==
King was born on October 7, 1949, in Niagara Falls, New York, where she graduated from LaSalle High School and attended Niagara County Community College from 1967 to 1969. She later moved to Montgomery Village, Maryland, where she became the vice president of her family's consulting and forensic engineering company, Trecor Inc., in 1987.

== Political career ==
King was appointed to the Montgomery Village Foundation Board of Directors, where she served from 1991 to 1996. In 1993, she became the president of the Montgomery County Council of Parent-Teacher Associations.

King was elected to represent the first district of the Montgomery County Board of Education in 1994, serving until her election to the Maryland House of Delegates in 2002. During her tenure, King served as the board's president from 1997 to 1998 and from 2000 to 2001, and was critical of Montgomery County Executive Doug Duncan's fiscal conservatism, especially toward cuts to the county's education funding. She also supported expanding the school system's school resource officer program following the September 11 attacks, supported studying later start times for classes, and reduced standardized testing.

=== Maryland House of Delegates ===
King was elected to the Maryland House of Delegates in 2002, and was sworn in on January 8, 2003. She served on the Ways and Means Committee and as deputy majority whip from 2006 to 2007.

=== Maryland Senate ===
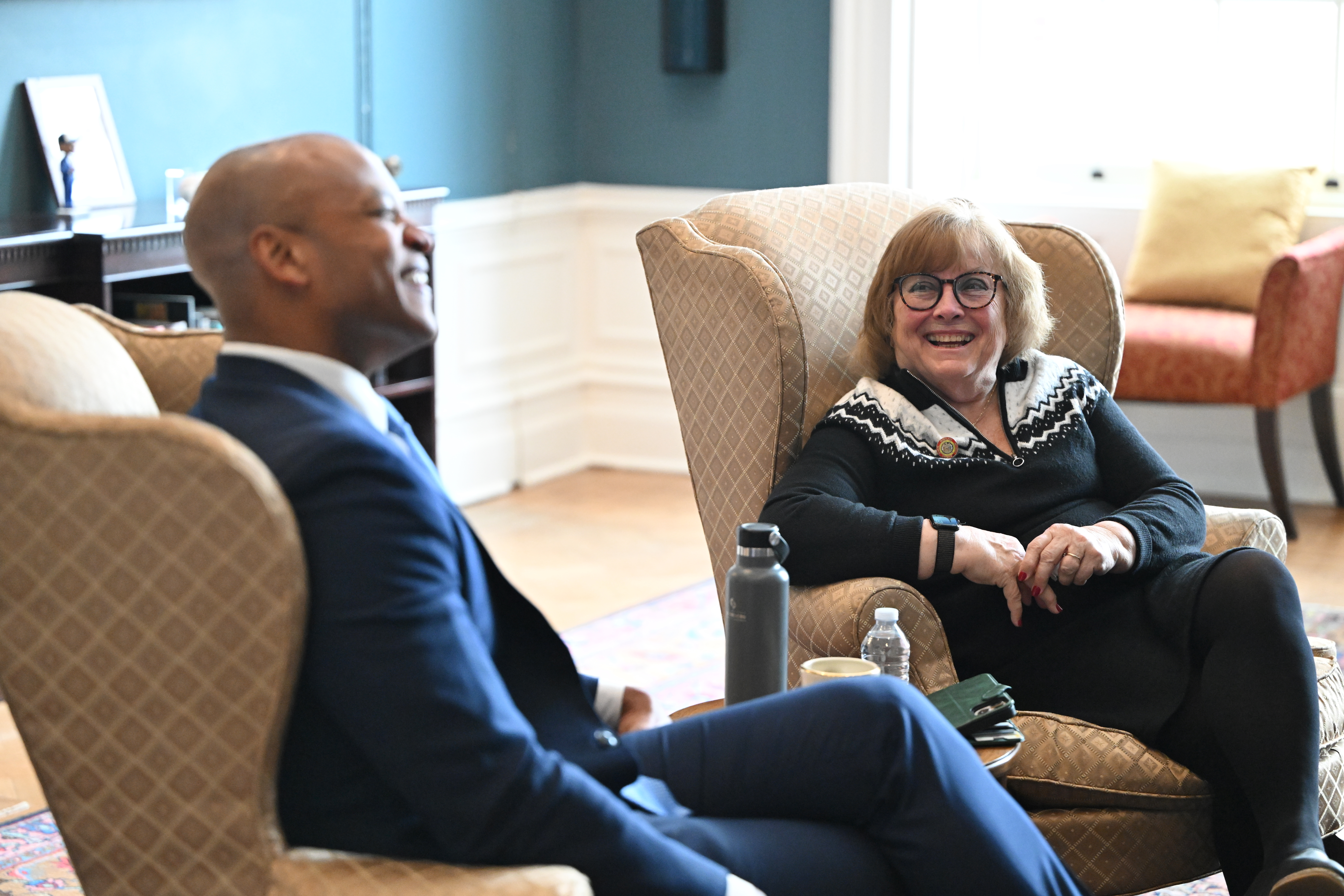
King meets with Governor Wes Moore, 2026

In July 2007, following the resignation of Patrick J. Hogan, King applied to serve the remainder of his term in the Maryland Senate. She was appointed to the seat by Governor Martin O'Malley and was sworn in on September 5, 2007. King was elected to a full term in 2010 after defeating state delegate Saqib Ali in a competitive primary election in which she ran with the backing of the Maryland Democratic Party establishment and used campaign material to try to embarrass Ali.

King was a member of the Budget and Taxation Committee during her entire tenure, including as the committee's chair during the 2019 legislative session, and was a member of the Executive Nominations Committee, the Rules Committee, and the Legislative Policy Committee from 2019 to 2027. In January 2018, she delivered the Democratic response to Governor Larry Hogan's State of the State Address.

In July 2019, King endorsed former vice president Joe Biden in the 2020 Democratic Party presidential primaries. She would later serve as a delegate to the Democratic National Convention pledged to Biden.

In December 2019, after Thomas V. Miller Jr. said he would not seek re-election as president of the Maryland Senate, King explored running to succeed him but ultimately decided against it. In January 2020, following the election of Bill Ferguson as Senate president, Ferguson appointed King to serve as majority leader of the Maryland Senate.

King ran for re-election to a fifth term in 2026, but was defeated by U.S. Army reservist Amar Mukunda in the Democratic primary election in an upset.

== Political positions ==
=== Education ===
In 2001, King supported efforts to repeal the county's ban on cell phones in the classroom, calling it a "security blanket" for students and parents amid the September 11 attacks.

In 2002, King said she opposed condom demonstrations in sex education classes, arguing that it was the responsibility of parents to teach their children how to use contraceptives.

During the 2007 legislative session, King introduced legislation to prohibit student school board members from voting on personnel matters.

In 2011, King voted for Maryland's Dream Act, a bill that extended in-state tuition for undocumented immigrants.

During the 2014 legislative session, King introduced a bill to stop the state from administering the Maryland School Assessment.

In 2015, King introduced a bill to provide $20 million annually to allow Montgomery County to issue $700 million in bonds for school construction.

During the 2018 legislative session, King introduced a bill to allow school districts to extend their school calendar up to five days past the state's June 15 deadline for closing schools without needing permission from the Maryland State Department of Education. The bill passed and was signed into law by Governor Larry Hogan. In 2019, she supported a bill that would repeal Hogan's executive order requiring schools to start after Labor Day and dismissed proposals from Hogan to hold a referendum on school start dates, calling it "silly" and "unnecessary".

During debate on the Blueprint for Maryland's Future bill in 2020, King introduced an amendment that would reduce funding for the Blueprint implementation if the COVID-19 pandemic reduced the state's revenues. The amendment was added to the bill.

=== Gambling ===
During the 2014 legislative session, King introduced a bill to repeal Maryland's ban on placing wagers on games of poker played at home. In 2020, she introduced legislation creating a ballot referendum to repeal the state's ban on sports betting, which passed and was approved by voters in November 2020. In 2023, she proposed a ballot referendum on legalizing online gambling.

=== Gun policy ===
During the 2006 legislative session, King supported a bill that would allow for the confiscation of weapons before a judge orders a final protective order.

During the 2013 legislative session, King voted for the Firearms Safety Act, a bill that placed restrictions on firearm purchases and magazine capacity in semi-automatic rifles.

=== Immigration ===
During the 2026 legislative session, King supported a bill to prohibit counties from entering into 287(g) program agreements with U.S. Immigration and Customs Enforcement (ICE), saying that ICE's approach to law enforcement could jeopardize the safety of immigrants without criminal records and criticizing Republicans for characterizing most immigrants as criminals.

=== Israel ===
In November 2023, King and eight other state senators signed a joint letter that threatened to defund immigrants rights group CASA de Maryland because it had called for an immediate ceasefire in the Gaza war and condemned the "utilization of US tax dollars to promote the ongoing violence."

=== National politics ===
In November 2025, King said she agreed with Senate President Bill Ferguson's opposition to mid-decade redistricting in Maryland to counter Republican gerrymandering efforts in various red states.

=== Policing ===
During the 2026 legislative session, King supported a bill to prohibit law enforcement officers from wearing face coverings, saying that the masking of U.S. Immigration and Customs Enforcement agents represents fear for the immigrants in her district.

=== Social issues ===
In 1996, King abstained from voting on a bill to ban LGBTQ discrimination in public education, saying that she thought the county no longer needed to spell out what groups needed special protections. In 1997, she voted against allowing a high school television production class to air a debate about same-sex marriage on the school's public cable channel. In 2006, King voted to uphold a committee decision blocking a bill to amend the state constitution to ban same-sex marriage. During her 2010 Senate campaign, she called legalizing same-sex marriage a "very, very difficult issue in our district" but said she would vote for it if a bill to do so was introduced. She voted for the Civil Marriage Protection Act in 2011 and 2012.

In June 2001, King said she would support renaming an elementary school in Germantown after Lillian B. Brown, a retired Black teacher who taught at a nearby school during segregation.

During the 2013 legislative session, King voted to repeal the death penalty.

In 2019, King supported the End-of-Life Option Act, which would have provided palliative care to terminally ill adults, likening it to getting an abortion.

=== Taxes ===
During the 2013 legislative session, King introduced legislation to give Lockheed Martin $450,000 in tax breaks. In 2018, she supported a bill providing $5.6 billion in tax incentives to Amazon to build their second headquarters in Montgomery County.

During the 2019 legislative session, King introduced a bill that would provide tax credits toward child and dependent care costs. The bill passed and was signed into law by Governor Larry Hogan.

=== Transportation ===
King supports proposals to add high-occupancy toll lanes to Interstate 270 and the Capital Beltway. In April 2021, she criticized a bill that would require more scrutiny over state public–private partnerships as an "attempt to add time and costs" to the highway projects. King blocked the bill from receiving a vote after Maryland Transportation Secretary Pete Rahn said it would result in a three-year delay to the highway projects.

== Personal life ==
King is married and has three children.

== Electoral history ==
Montgomery County Board of Education District 1 election, 1998
Candidate	Votes	%
Nancy J. King (incumbent)	156,064	97.7
Write-in	3,601	2.3

Maryland House of Delegates District 39 Democratic primary election, 2002
Party	Candidate	Votes	%
Democratic	Charles E. Barkley (incumbent)	6,283	34.3
Democratic	Nancy J. King	6,136	33.5
Democratic	Joan F. Stern (incumbent)	5,915	32.3

Maryland House of Delegates District 39 election, 2002
Party	Candidate	Votes	%
Democratic	Charles E. Barkley (incumbent)	16,509	20.6
Democratic	Nancy J. King	16,477	20.6
Democratic	Joan F. Stern (incumbent)	15,461	19.3
Republican	Robert J. Smith	10,490	13.1
Republican	Kyle Winkfield	10,086	12.6
Republican	Bill Witham	9,027	11.3
Independent	Bill White	1,846	2.3
Write-in		73	0.1

Maryland House of Delegates District 39 election, 2006
Party	Candidate	Votes	%
Democratic	Nancy J. King (incumbent)	18,651	23.5
Democratic	Charles E. Barkley (incumbent)	18,253	23.0
Democratic	Saqib Ali	16,455	20.7
Republican	David Nichols	9,278	11.7
Republican	Gary Scott	8,363	10.5
Republican	Bill Witham	8,244	10.4
Write-in		68	0.1

Maryland Senate District 39 Democratic primary election, 2010
Party	Candidate	Votes	%
Democratic	Nancy J. King (incumbent)	3,695	51.7
Democratic	Saqib Ali	3,447	48.3

Maryland Senate District 39 election, 2010
Party	Candidate	Votes	%
Democratic	Nancy J. King (incumbent)	17,990	64.6
Republican	Robert J. Smith	9,724	34.9
Write-in		138	0.5

Maryland Senate District 39 election, 2014
Party	Candidate	Votes	%
Democratic	Nancy J. King (incumbent)	18,808	97.2
Write-in		536	2.8

Maryland Senate District 39 election, 2018
Party	Candidate	Votes	%
Democratic	Nancy J. King (incumbent)	32,417	79.3
Republican	Al Phillips	8,434	20.6
Write-in		53	0.1

Maryland Senate District 39 election, 2022
Party	Candidate	Votes	%
Democratic	Nancy J. King (incumbent)	25,188	86.2
Green	Moshe Landman	3,582	12.3
Write-in		457	1.6

Maryland Senate
Preceded by Guy Guzzone	Majority Leader of the Maryland Senate; 2020–present	Incumbent
