= W. Gregory Wims =

American politician (born 1949)

- Wims in 2026

Member of the Maryland House of Delegates from the 39th district
- Incumbent
- Assumed office May 2, 2023 Serving with Gabriel Acevero and Lesley Lopez
- Appointed by: Wes Moore
- Preceded by: Kirill Reznik

Personal details
- Born: William Gregory Wims; September 2, 1949 (age 77) Bethesda, Maryland, U.S.
- Party: Democratic
- Other political affiliations: Republican (formerly)
- Children: 1
- Education: University of Maryland, College Park (BS)

William Gregory Wims (born September 2, 1949) is an American politician, businessman, and community volunteer who is currently a member of the Maryland House of Delegates from District 39.

== Early life and education ==
Wims was born in Bethesda, Maryland on September 2, 1949, to mother Rachel Stewart Wims and father Earl Alexandir Wims, a laborer. He was raised in Stewart Town, a historically Black community near Montgomery Village, Maryland, in a home purchased by his ancestors after slavery. Wims is a seven-generation ancestor of enslaved people; his great-great-grandfather worked as a freedman in Stewart Town, and his great-grandfather Richard Stewart was one of several founders of the town. Many of his relatives grew up near Clarksburg High School, which is situated on Wims Road, and Wilson Wims Elementary School is named after one of his relatives.

Wims graduated from Gaithersburg High School in 1968, and later attended Montgomery College until 1970, when he transferred to Howard University. He later earned a B.S. degree in political science from the University of Maryland, College Park.

== Career ==
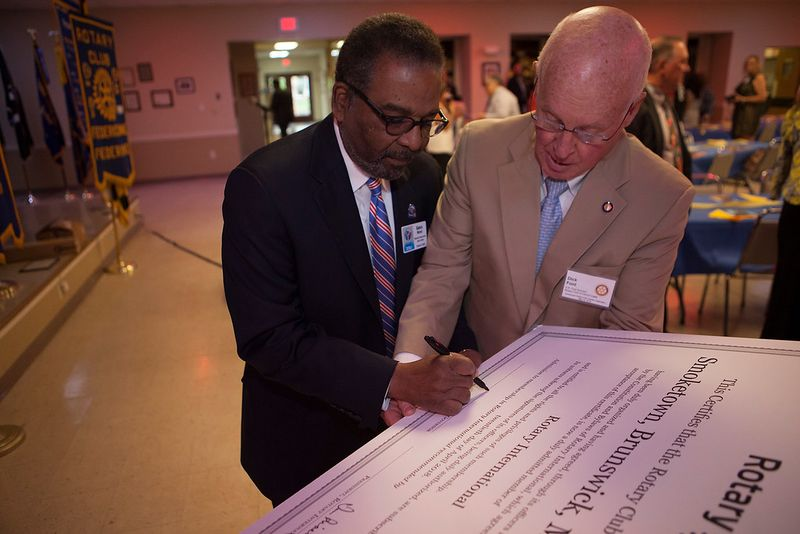
Wims (left) with the Smoketown Rotary Club, 2018

Wims worked in the prison ministry at the county jail when he was 17 years old. He was elected to the Maryland Youth Commission soon after graduating from high school. In this position, Wims supported lowering the voting age in Maryland from 21 to 18.

In the early 1970s, Montgomery County Executive James P. Gleason appointed Wims to the Montgomery County Maryland Human Rights Commission, where he was its youngest member. In 1974, he became the first male Head Start teacher in Montgomery County. In 1976, Wims joined the congressional campaign of U.S. Representative Newton Steers, eventually becoming his chief legislative officer and the first African American from Montgomery County to work on Capitol Hill until 1978. Afterwards, he worked as a legislative assistant to U.S. Representative Melvin H. Evans. In 1980, he worked on the presidential campaign of former California governor Ronald Reagan, later working in the Reagan administration as a legislative assistant to the Secretary of Agriculture, and as the Special Assistant to the Director of Minority Affairs and Economic Development until 1989, when he left to start his own government consulting firm, Hammer and Nails Inc.

In the early 1990s, Wims served as the membership chairman for the National Association for the Advancement of Colored People (NAACP). In 1993, he was elected president of the Montgomery County NAACP, eventually becoming the president of the state NAACP branch in 1995. From 1997 to 1998, he worked as a liaison to Montgomery County's minority community for the Montgomery County Police Department. In September 2000, Wims was named executive director of the Montgomery Business Alliance and membership director of the Montgomery County Chamber of Commerce. He was later appointed by President George W. Bush to serve as a deputy administrator of the Small Business Administration and as a board member of the John F. Kennedy Center for the Performing Arts.

In January 2000, Wims announced that he would form an exploratory committee to consider a run in the special election for the Montgomery County Council seat in District 1, following the resignation of Republican councilmember Betty Ann Krahnke.

In 2018, Wims unsuccessfully ran for the Montgomery County Democratic Central Committee in District 15, receiving 42.4 percent of the vote. He later served on the transition team of Montgomery County Executive-elect Marc Elrich in November 2018. In July 2021, Elrich appointed Wims to serve as a director for the Montgomery County Regional Service.

As of July 2021, Wims has served on over 30 non-profit boards, including Holy Cross Hospital, the Alliance for the Chesapeake Bay, and Adventist Hospital. He is also the founder of the Victims' Rights Foundation and the Sniper Victims' Fund, and has raised over $2 million for various causes.

== In the legislature ==
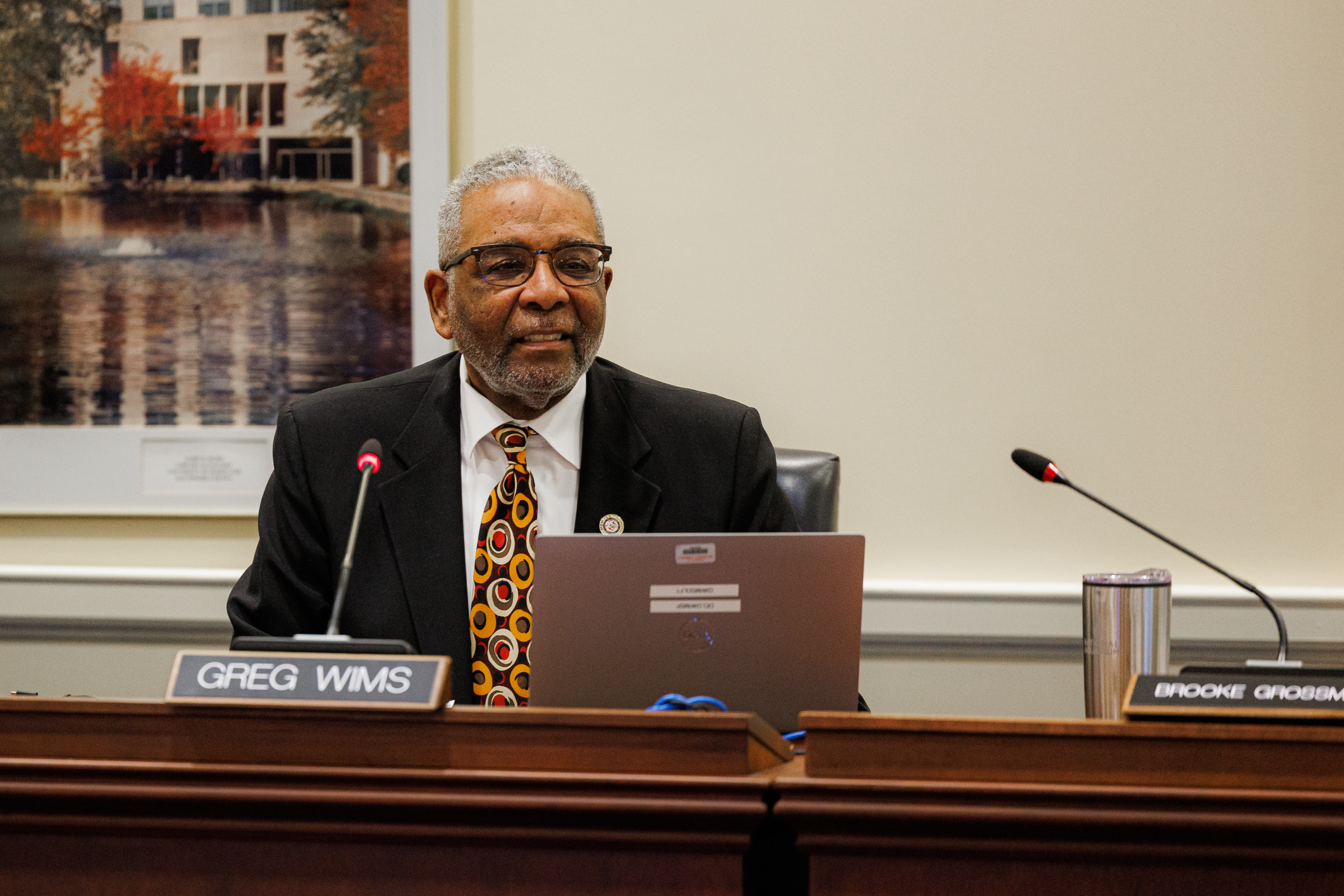
Wims in the House Ways and Means Committee, 2024

In April 2023, Wims applied to fill a vacancy left by the resignation of state delegate Kirill Reznik to serve as the Assistant Secretary for Inter-Departmental Data Integration for the Maryland Department of Human Services. He won the nomination by a vote of 17–6 on April 18, 2023. He was sworn in on May 2, 2023, and is the first descendant of enslaved people elected to the Maryland House of Delegates. In January 2026, Wims was named as a deputy majority whip for the Maryland House of Delegates.

== Political positions ==
In 1991, Wims identified as a "moderate conservative" member of the Republican Party. He supported the Supreme Court nomination of Clarence Thomas. In 2020, Wims unsuccessfully ran for delegate to the Democratic National Convention, pledged to former Vice President Joe Biden.

During the 2026 legislative session, Wims supported a bill to raise the minimum wage of Maryland from $15 to $25 an hour and eliminate all subminimum wages. He also introduced the Voting Rights Act, which creates state protections for minority voters in local elections and allows the attorney general of Maryland to sue over practices that weaken minority voting power.

== Personal life ==
Wims has a daughter named Rachel Wims, who took over as CEO of the Victims' Rights Foundation in January 2019.
