= Montgomery, Maryland =

Montgomery, Maryland, may refer to:

- Montgomery Village, Maryland
- Montgomery County, Maryland
