= Patrick J. Hogan =

Patrick J. Hogan may refer to:

- Patrick Hogan (Cumann na nGaedheal politician) (1891–1936), Irish farmer, solicitor and politician
- Patrick J. Hogan (Maryland politician) (born 1962), American lobbyist and politician from Maryland
