= Saqib Ali =

Former member of the Maryland House of Delegates

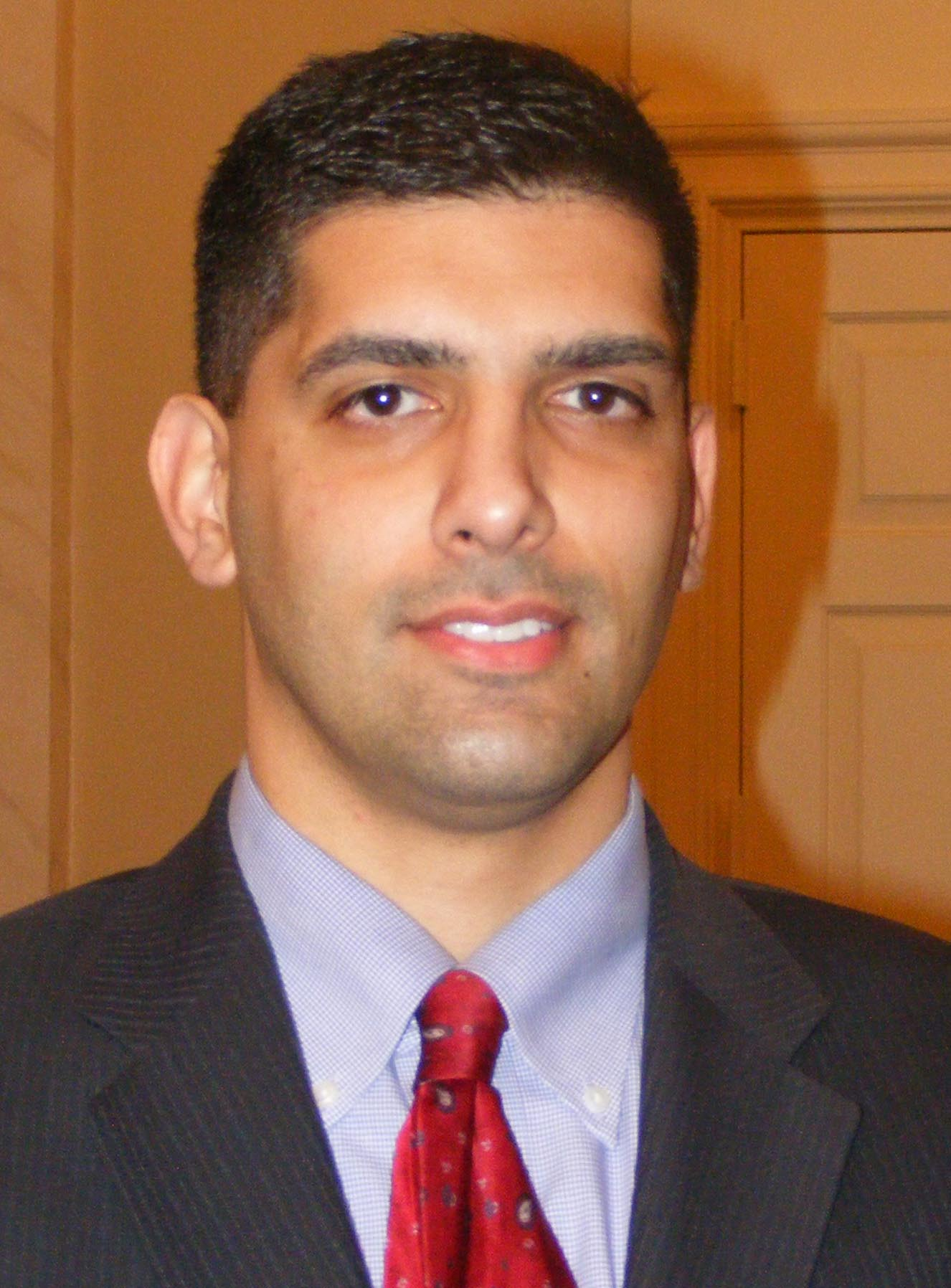

Member of the Maryland House of Delegates from the 39th district
- In office January 10, 2007 – January 12, 2011
- Preceded by: Joan F. Stern
- Succeeded by: Shane Robinson

Personal details
- Born: January 21, 1975 (age 51) Chicago, Illinois
- Party: Democratic
- Spouse: Susan Ali
- Children: 2
- Occupation: Software engineer

Saqib Ali (born January 21, 1975) is an American politician who was a State Delegate in the Maryland House of Delegates, having been elected in 2006 to represent the 39th District.

== Background ==
Saqib Ali was born on 21 January 1975 in Chicago, Illinois. He is Muslim and credits his parents, who are of Indian and Pakistani descent, as the reason he became involved in politics. "[I am] from a family where they were always having political debates around the house, but then I found out that among all these family members who had all these grand ideas, none of them ever voted. There was a sense that, 'I don't like the way things are, but there's nothing I can do about it.' I thought: I'm going to show these people."

Ali moved to Montgomery County, Maryland in 1991 to attend the University of Maryland, College Park. He went on to receive Bachelor of Science and Master of Science degrees in Computer Science.

== Democratic volunteer and community activist ==
Ali was not originally a member of the Democratic party but changed parties after listening to Representative Chris Van Hollen (D-Md.). Ali was "so enamored of Van Hollen's foreign policy positions that he changed his party affiliation from Green to Democratic." Ali soon became "the first elected President of the District 39 Democratic Club". Ali's political activity first gained media attention when he "was the Legislative District 39 Coordinator for the Howard Dean presidential campaign in 2003 and early 2004." After Dean failed to win the primary, Ali supported the John Kerry and John Edwards presidential ticket. During that election season, Ali became a full-time campaign volunteer for Rep. Chris Van Hollen, because of Van Hollen's foreign policy positions and his stance on the Iraq War. Later that year, he was co-chair of the Montgomery County Democratic Spring Ball. Also in 2004, Ali, a member of the Montgomery County Muslim Council, helped plan "the first Muslim-Jewish Day of Friendship" with "congregations Temple Shalom in Chevy Chase, Adat Shalom in Bethesda, Bethesda Jewish Congregation and Fabrangen Cheder" to "clean up a historic Underground Railroad stop in Germantown". In 2005, Ali's political activities expanded when he helped form the "Longdraft Road Coalition", an organization opposing the expansion of this "quiet, residential two-lane road to a bustling four-lane byway." Ali became "co-chairman of the 180-person plus group" whose efforts were largely viewed as successful. In September 2005, Ali also co-organized "The 2nd annual Montgomery County Muslim-Jewish Day of Friendship". In 2005, Ali was a campaign supporter of Jun Choi, the Democratic candidate for Mayor of Edison, New Jersey, which Choi won.

== 2006 election campaign ==
On October 1, 2005, Ali announced his candidacy for inclusion on the three-person Democratic slate for "Legislative District 39 which includes Montgomery Village, Washington Grove and parts of Gaithersburg, Derwood, Germantown and North Potomac." Members of the Maryland General Assembly have four-year terms.

=== MCEA endorsement ===
On January 30, 2006, candidate Ali "accompanied a Montgomery County Education Association (MCEA) contingent to Annapolis to lobby legislators to improve the state's... teacher pension system." By June 2006, MCEA had given Ali its "much sought-after endorsement" which "has always carried considerable weight in the minds of county voters. The Apple Ballot lists the recommended candidates that support public education and 11,000 educators. This ballot is an indication of politicians that support public schools and their employees."

=== Anti-Muslim protester ===
On August 12, 2006, Timothy James Truett of Montgomery Village allegedly made a "call to Ali's office in which he asked if Ali was a Muslim and made derogatory remarks about Islam to Ali's campaign manager." Afterward, Truett drove to "the cul-de-sac outside Ali's Gaithersburg home, which doubles as his campaign office." There, he sat down in a lawn chair near the home "with a hand-lettered sign bearing a crude denunciation of Islam" [that said 'Islam Sucks']. Truett "wore a T-shirt reading 'This mind is an Allah-free zone'." Ali went out to look at the man and take pictures but did not speak to him, explaining "I knew he was there to bait me." Ali later recalled "I felt like he was intimidating and trying to menace me and my family, similar to when people burned crosses in someone's front yard. I think it was the exact same message." Ali's wife stepped outside and took pictures of Truett. An older man approached Truett and offered him some water. Ali then spoke to the older man and the older man went back inside. Ali placed one of his campaign yard signs next to Truett and took a picture. Truett then got up and left. Ali followed him and got pictures of his license plate. Truett then phoned Ali's office again but was hung up on. Ali later posted pictures of Truett, Truett's birth date and address on his campaign web site.

Both Ali and the police agreed that nothing illegal had happened, as he "was in a common area and not on Ali's property. Police apparently notified Truett later that he could be arrested if he did go onto the candidate's property in the next year." Ali told reporters that he is "100 percent Muslim and 100 percent American.... My faith is my faith... but that's incidental." He said "his candidacy is about such matters as 'roads, the schools' and not his religion." Quoting directly, "the demonstration 'reminds me of the need to build bridges amongst people and among communities.'"

=== Primary ===
On September 10, 2006, Ali was endorsed by The Washington Post which one county political veteran ranked as only behind that of the Democratic Party for its influence on local voters. The Post said "Political newcomer Saqib Ali has shown good command of issues and would bring new vigor to this district's delegation." On September Sept. 20, 2006, it was announced Ali had won the Democratic primary in Maryland's 39th Legislative District, defeating incumbent Delegate Joan F. Stern for a position on the slate with Del's Nancy J. King and Charles E. Barkley for the November general election. Stern had lost the outright endorsement of King and Barkley as she was not seen as a team-player. King noted that "Ali was a 'breath of fresh air' to voters", while political veteran Gene Counihan said "As far as I could see, he followed the book on how to win an election. I saw him on the campaign trail more than anybody. He was out door-to-door; he had impressive literature. He wanted it." Ali ascribed his electoral victory to connecting with voters. "Our campaign had a lot of energy. It had that underdog feel that struck a chord with people and resonated. When you talk to real voters, not the insiders, they care if you pay attention to them. They remember that you listened to them. People appreciate new blood."

King won 28 percent of the vote, Barkley fetched 27 percent, Ali came in with 25 percent and Stern took 18 percent, according to unofficial results. About 16,600 District 39 voters went to the polls.

On November 2, 2006, The Washington Post endorsed the Democratic slate calling Ali "a bright newcomer".

=== General Election ===
Ali, King, and Barkley faced Republican challengers David Nichols, Gary Scott, and Bill Witham in the November 2006 election. The Democratic slate won, averaging 22.4% over their challengers, who averaged 10.9% of ballets cast.

After his election, Ali told reporters that his "district is about 40 percent minority... and part of his campaign involved introducing those new immigrants to the political process, registering new voters and showing them how to cast a ballot. 'Bringing new Americans into the process is good for everybody. It's empowering.'" Ali raised nearly $120,000 for his campaign, mostly from family and his personal funds.

In its electing both Ali and Kumar P. Barve (from the 17th District), "Maryland became the first state to send two South Asians to the state legislature". This occurrence was seen as an indication that Asian Americans have "political clout beyond traditional strongholds in California and Hawaii." Ali's election is also seen as evidence of another American minority moving towards civic empowerment by participating in the political process, as "[h]e is the first Muslim in the Maryland State legislature." His election and that of Keith Ellison (D-MN) to the United States Congress are viewed by Michelle Boorstein of The Washington Post as "part of a concerted march of Muslims into civic and political life" in reaction to "worries about civil liberties and immigration policy" that began after Sept. 11, 2001.

=== Muslim political participation ===
In CNN's "Election Night 2006" coverage on November 7, 2006, Candy Crowley mentioned Ali in a discussion about Keith Ellison (D-MN) and the growth of Muslim political participation in the United States. Mohammed Babah, president of the Muslim Community Center of Maryland saw Ali's election as important for his community "This is huge. I believe we have a voice now, a voice that is not of suspicion, a voice that will show the Muslim view. After 9/11, Muslims were under the microscope. To elect this man shows the confidence that the country has in the majority of good Muslim people. This is reassuring."

The Washington Post reported that since "Saqib Ali was elected to the Maryland House of Delegates this month, he has been flooded with calls and e-mails from across the country asking: How'd you do it? The calls come from American Muslims like Ali, who, longtime political watchers and Muslim activists in the area say, is the first Muslim elected to a statewide – or district-wide – office in Maryland, Virginia or the District.... [E]ight Muslims ran for office in Maryland this year, significantly more than in previous years, although only Ali won. And initial polling data and anecdotal evidence suggest that significantly more Muslims in Virginia registered and voted this month than in previous elections." Ever since his election Ali "has been busy answering those requests for advice [from other Muslims wanting to get civically involved]. 'What I tell them is, know your community well, work hard and don't be a one-issue candidate. And don't let anyone paint you as "the Muslim candidate."

Delegate Ali joined U.S. Representative Keith Ellison (D-MN), U.S. Rep. André Carson (D-IN), State Rep. Ako Abdul-Samad (D-IA), State Senator Larry Shaw (D-NC), and State Rep. Saghir "Saggy" Tahir (R-NH) as the only elected Muslim officeholders in the United States as of 2006.

== Maryland's 423rd legislative session ==
Ali officially took office on January 10, 2006, among 33 other first-time delegates (and 11 freshmen state senators). Ali's Democratic Party held 104 of 141 delegate seats and 33 of 47 senate seats, giving it veto-proof margins in the State Legislature. Ali was assigned to the House Environmental Matters Committee.

After taking office, Ali was interviewed by the Associated Press while "holding his snoozing 8-month-old daughter outside the House chamber". When asked about the anti-Muslim protester during the campaign, Ali said the protester "was an exception to his experience on the campaign. 'It was disappointing that that kind of bigotry would still rear its head, but I understand it was an isolated incident. Occasionally people would ask if I was Muslim, but most of the time it was a curiosity, not an obstacle.'" Ali did not want to be seen as just a novelty because of his religion, he said he'd "like to work on transportation matters and to pass a bill making it tougher for companies to track information and buying habits of private citizens." He wanted his constituents to know he's one of them and said, "I will represent the Muslims, but more importantly, I will represent all the people. I'm a Muslim, but I'm also a resident." In other interviews that asked the same question, Ali replied "I'm Muslim, and that'll always be the case, but I'm here to push good issues and good policy for all Marylanders.... We're looking for good ideas", and "I'm here to push good ideas, not so much to push my faith."

Recalling the Quran Oath Controversy of the 110th United States Congress, the AP noted, "There was no religious controversy as Ali took the oath of office with his colleagues. Maryland lawmakers do not hold their hands on a religious text while taking office." Also joining Ali in the Maryland House was Majority Leader Kumar P. Barve (D-Montgomery County), a Hindu who's held office since 1990. Ali will be working in "the oldest statehouse in the country still in use by lawmakers and [a place] that George Washington once walked the hallways."

=== Slot machines ===
After his election as Governor, Martin O'Malley (D) renewed his four-year call for the state to use revenue from slot machines to reduce its fiscal problem. Opposition to slot machines was one of the issues that Ali ran on and he repeated this position on Maryland Public Radio, citing his fears of the effects that such a measure would have on families of gambling addicts and calling for the state to close corporate tax loopholes instead. The need to speedily implement slot machine usage in the state was also questioned by Maryland Speaker of the House Michael E. Busch, (D-Anne Arundel County), who "saw no need to take up the issue this year".

=== Legislative notes ===
- voted in favor of Clean Indoor Air Act of 2007 (HB359)
- voted in favor of Public Institutions of Higher Education - Tuition Rates - Exemptions (HB6)

== 2010 & 2014 election campaigns ==
In 2010, Ali challenged incumbent Maryland Senator Nancy J. King to represent the same 39th district. He was defeated by 3.47%. Ali began a campaign for his old seat in the House of Delegates for the 2014 election but ultimately decided to drop out of the race.

== Activism ==
Ali is the co-founder of Freedom2Boycott in Maryland, an organization of Palestinian solidarity activists who opposes anti-BDS laws that they believe infringe on their constitutional right to boycott Israel and Israeli settlements. The organization helped defeat anti-BDS bills in the Maryland House from 2014 to 2017, but then Governor Larry Hogan issued an executive order requiring state contractors to pledge that they will not boycott Israel to be eligible for contracts. Ali subsequently sued the state as he thought the order infringed on his constitutional rights. Ali lost the suit as the court upheld the Executive Order.

== Personal life and career ==
Ali, his parents, and his sister are all long-time Montgomery County residents. He has been married since 1999 to his wife Susan whom he met when they were working at a computer networking firm. They originally lived in Montgomery Village, but moved to Gaithersburg with their 1-month old daughter Sofia. Upon taking office they relocated to Annapolis.

Ali is employed as a Senior Software Engineer by The Mitre Corporation in McLean, Virginia. He is the only engineer (though he does not have a degree in engineering) among the 188 legislators in the Maryland General Assembly.

On April 10, 2005, The Washington Post ran a story about the couple's struggle with a holoprosencephaly (HPE) pregnancy, and an on-line chat with them about reaction to the story.

In October 2021, Ali applied to fill a vacancy in the House of Delegates created by the resignation of Kathleen Dumais. Leaders of the Montgomery County Muslim Council pressured Democratic leaders to appoint him to fill the seat, but the Montgomery County Democratic Central Committee ultimately appointed the panel's chair, Linda Foley, to fill the vacancy by a vote of 20–2, with one committee member not voting and Foley abstaining.

Although Ali is running for District 15 Delegate in the 2022 Democratic Party, on July 1, 2022 a consent final protective order was filed in a case involving Ali's wife's allegations that Ali has engaged in domestic abuse.

== Electoral history ==
- 2006 Race for Maryland House of Delegates–39th District

Voters to choose three:

Name	Votes	Percent	Outcome
Nancy J. King, Democratic	18,651	23.5%	Won
Charles E. Barkley, Democratic	18,253	23.0%	Won
Saqib Ali, Democratic	16,455	20.7%	Won
David Nichols, Republican	9,278	11.7%	Lost
Gary Scott, Republican	8,363	10.4%	Lost
Bill Witham, Republican	8,244	10.4%	Lost

- 2010 Race for Maryland Senate−39th district

Maryland Senate District 39 Democratic primary election, 2010
Party	Candidate	Votes	%
Democratic	Nancy J. King (incumbent)	3,695	51.7
Democratic	Saqib Ali	3,447	48.3

- 2022 Race for Maryland House of Delegates−15th district

Voters to choose three:

Democratic primary results
Party	Candidate	Votes	%
Democratic	Lily Qi (incumbent)	12,293	31.4
Democratic	Linda Foley (incumbent)	11,002	28.1
Democratic	David Fraser-Hidalgo (incumbent)	10,726	27.4
Democratic	Saqib Ali	5,145	13.1
