= Gabriel Acevero =

American politician (born 1990)

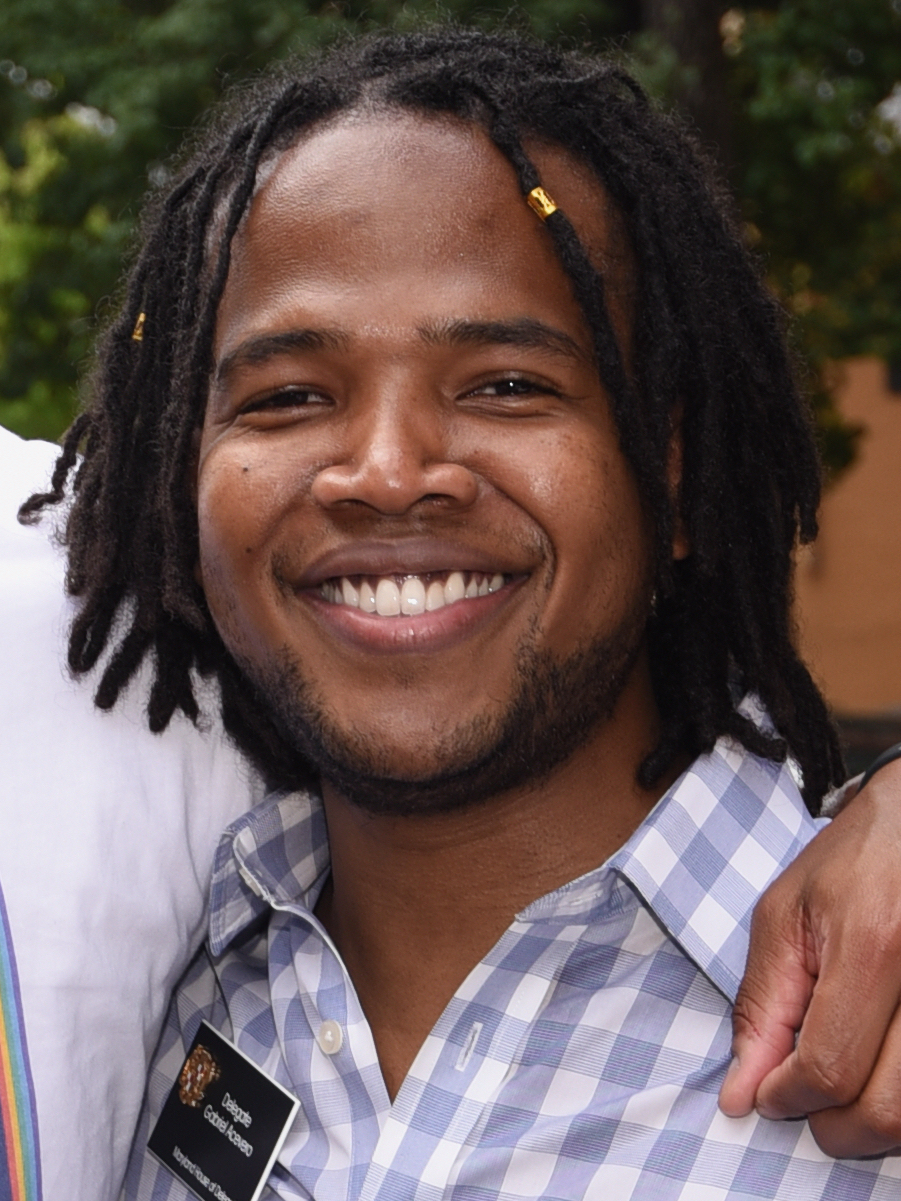
- Acevero in 2023

Member of the Maryland House of Delegates from the 39th district
- Incumbent
- Assumed office January 9, 2019 Serving with Lesley Lopez, W. Gregory Wims
- Preceded by: Shane Robinson

Personal details
- Born: October 23, 1990 (age 35) San Fernando, Trinidad and Tobago
- Party: Democratic
- Other political affiliations: Democratic Socialists of America
- Education: Montgomery College (AA); University of Maryland, Baltimore County (BA)
- Website: gabeacevero.org

Gabriel Acevero (born October 23, 1990) is a Trinidadian–American organizer, activist and politician representing Maryland's 39th House district. On November 6, 2018, Acevero finished in first place with 31% of the vote and became the first openly gay Afro-Latino, and one of the youngest people, elected to the Maryland House of Delegates. Acevero is a member of the Democratic Socialists of America.

== Early life and education ==
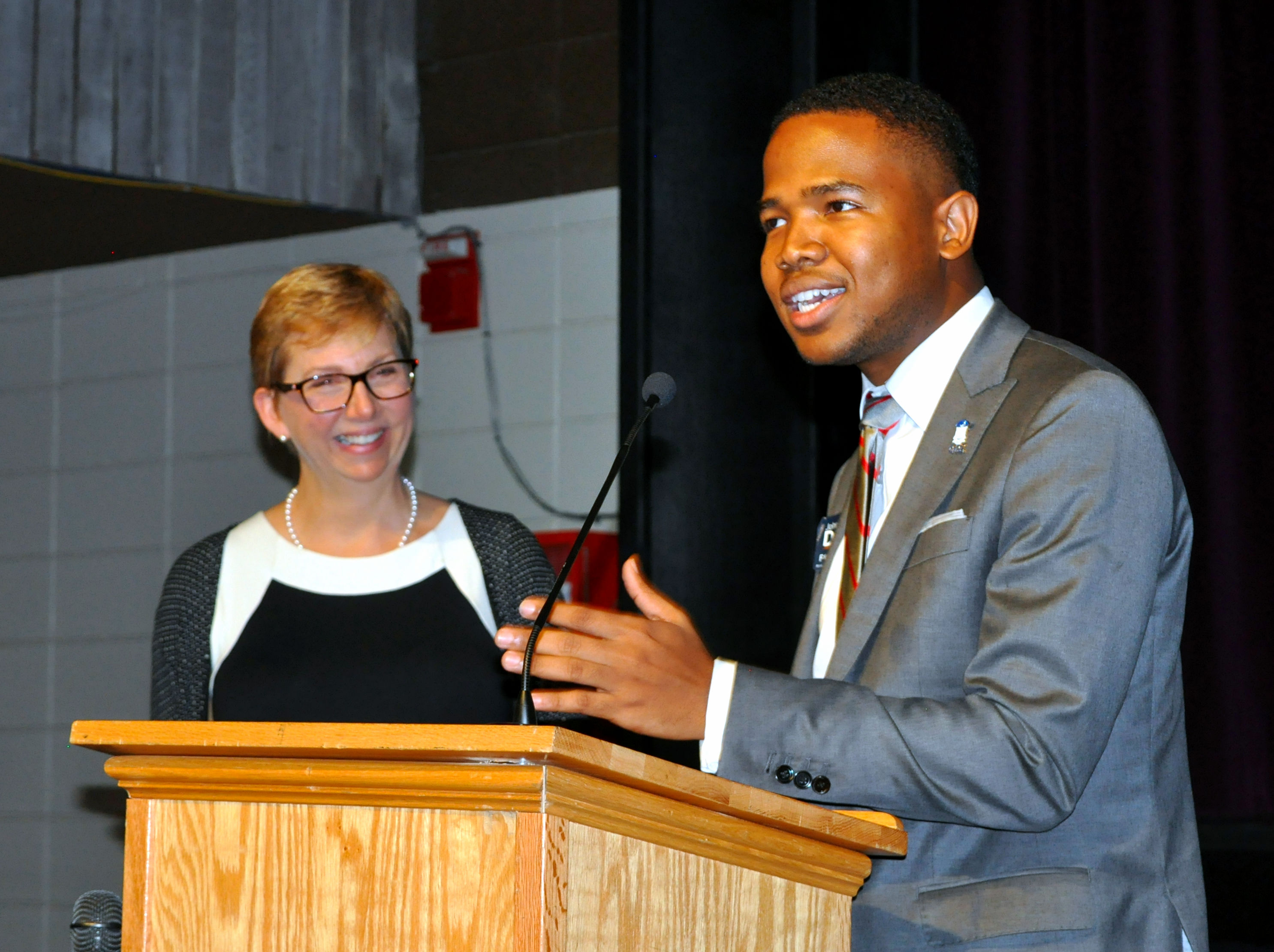
Acevero speaking in 2016

Acevero was born on October 23, 1990, in San Fernando, Trinidad; the youngest of six children. His paternal family is Afro-Venezuelan and his mother is Afro-Trinidadian. Acevero was raised in the town of Couva and attended Richmond Street Boys Anglican School in the capital, Port-of-Spain. He graduated from Couva Government Secondary School in 2007, where he was a member of the school's debate team. Later that year, his family immigrated to the United States, settling in Maryland. Acevero started college at 16, earning his associate degree in international relations from Montgomery College and a bachelor's degree in political science from the University of Maryland, Baltimore County (UMBC) in 2011 at the age of 20. He was a student activist in college, volunteered for political campaigns, and was active in the Maryland Democratic Party.

== Political career ==
=== Activism ===
After college, Acevero worked as an issue organizer. He was involved in the successful Question 4 (Maryland Dream Act) and Question 6 (Marriage Equality) campaigns in 2012, which resulted in Maryland becoming the first state to approve both measures at the ballot box. Then, in 2014, he worked on transgender equality. In 2015, he was recognized by the National Black Justice Coalition as one of its "100 Black LGBTQ Emerging Leaders to Watch" for his advocacy and efforts to reform Maryland's justice system.

A Black Lives Matter activist, Acevero helped organize and participated in protests during the 2015 Freddie Gray unrest in Baltimore City. Acevero joined the coalition of activists and organizations that pushed for the repeal of Maryland's Law Enforcement Officers Bill of Rights (LEOBR) following Freddie Gray's death. Before running for office, he was involved in decarceration efforts in Maryland.

Acevero joined the Maryland Fight for $15 campaign and organized low-wage workers and community groups to support raising the minimum wage in Montgomery County. The County Council overwhelmingly approved the bill, which was signed into law in 2017.

In December 2017, Acevero was one of a group of activists, labor leaders, clergy, and lawmakers arrested on the steps of Capitol Hill for engaging in an unlawful demonstration. The group was hoping to pressure Congress to include legislation for undocumented immigrants who came to the US as children (known as DREAMers).

He was also behind the push that led to renaming a Rockville, Maryland, elementary school in honor of gay civil rights leader Bayard Rustin. In his testimony before the Montgomery County Board of Education, Acevero criticized the Trump administration's decision to remove LGBTQ people off the US Census and the transgender military ban: "We have a hostile administration that is intent on erasing LGBTQ folks, recently taking us off the Census and banning transgender Americans from serving their country. Now more than ever we need to affirm LGBTQ youth, and that's why Bayard Rustin is such a powerful name for this school". The Montgomery County Board of Education voted to approve changing the school's name to Bayard Rustin Elementary.

=== Maryland House of Delegates ===
Acevero ran in the three-member house district, which includes parts of Gaithersburg, Germantown, Clarksburg, Montgomery Village, and Washington Grove. He won the Democratic primary on June 26, 2018, coming in ahead of three-term incumbent Delegate Kirill Reznik and edging out two-term incumbent Delegate Shane Robinson in the hotly contested primary. He faced minimal Republican opposition in the general and was elected on November 6, 2018, at the age of 28. Acevero was sworn in on a copy of James Baldwin's 1963 book, The Fire Next Time, and assumed office on January 9, 2019. He serves on the House Appropriations Committee and is a member of the Maryland Legislative Black Caucus, the Latino Legislative Caucus, and the Montgomery County Delegation.

In December 2019, Acevero attended a rally in Gaithersburg, Maryland, to support the impeachment of Donald Trump.

In 2020, Delegate Acevero endorsed Senator Bernie Sanders for the 2020 Democratic Party presidential primaries. During the 2024 Democratic Party presidential primaries, he urged voters to cast an "Uncommitted" protest vote against President Joe Biden for his handling of the Gaza war.

In the 2022 Democratic primary, other members of the House district campaigned for another Democrat to replace Acevero. Nonetheless, Acevero won reelection to the ticket. In October 2025, Acevero's District 39 colleagues once again launched a primary challenge against him, recruiting Gaithersburg city councilmember Robert Wu to run against him. Acevero again won the Democratic primary on June 23, 2026, placing second behind state delegate Lesley Lopez.

== Political positions ==
=== Cannabis ===
In 2022, Acevero voted in support of cannabis legalization and voted in favor of HB 1, "Constitutional Amendment – Cannabis – Adult Use and Possession." He was one of two Democrats to vote against House Bill 837, which is another Cannabis Reform bill. The bill aimed to study the racial impacts of cannabis legalization, create a public health fund, alter civil and criminal penalties, and create a process of expungement for possession of the drug. Acevero stated that, despite supporting cannabis legalization, he believed that certain aspects of the legalization need to be addressed before the state can move forward. He said the bill "does not create true racial equity related to minority ownerships of licensed growing, processing and dispensing businesses."

Delegate Acevero introduced his own bill HB1342, "Cannabis - Legalization and Regulation (Cannabis Legalization and Equity Act)", in 2022 which would legalize "the possession and use of a certain amount of cannabis by a person of at least a certain age; providing for expungement of records, dismissal of charges, and commutation of sentences in certain cases involving cannabis-related charges; providing for a system of regulation of the sale of cannabis by the Maryland Department of Health and local jurisdictions; and providing for the taxation of the sale of cannabis in the State."

=== Criminal justice ===
During the 2019 legislative session, Acevero introduced "Anton's Law," a bill that reformed the Maryland Public Information Act to require transparency in investigations of complaints against law enforcement officers. The bill was named for Anton Black, a 19-year-old African-American man who died in police custody in Greensboro, Maryland. In July 2020, Acevero accused local union leaders of using "strong-arm tactics" to slow down Anton's Law. Gino Renne, president of Montgomery County Government Employees Organization Local 1994 (MCGEO), had expressed concern over Acevero's support of the legislation. Rene asked him to attend a meeting, where Acevero claims Renne and others pressured him to drop Anton's Law. Renne fiercely denied Acevero's accusations, calling them a "bold-face lie." During the 2021 legislative session, the Maryland General Assembly passed Anton's Law as part of the Maryland Police Accountability Act of 2021. The law took effect on October 1, 2021.

During the 2021 legislative session, Acevero introduced legislation to prohibit school districts from contracting with local law enforcement agencies to station school resource officers in public schools.

During the 2026 legislative session, Acevero supported a bill to end the practice of automatically charging minors as adults for certain crimes.

=== Education ===
During the 2020 legislative session, Acevero expressed support for the Blueprint for Maryland's Future. He noted that "What we're trying to do here is change the trajectory of this state ... All of us will win when we invest in education". He also sponsored HB0489, a bill that establishes the Commission on History, Culture, and Civics in Education. The commission would aim to recommend ways to enhance the teaching of US and Maryland history, culture, and civics to the State Board of Education and the State Department of Education, and it would report findings and recommendations annually by December 30.

=== Health care ===
During the 2020 legislative session, Acevero and state senator Jill P. Carter introduced legislation to establish a universal single-payer health care system in Maryland.

=== Immigration ===
During the 2021 legislative session, Acevero spoke in support of the Dignity Not Detention Act that would prevent counties from contracting with U.S. Immigration and Customs Enforcement (ICE), during which he described the tactics of ICE as being similar to the Gestapo during World War II. In April 2025, he attended and spoke at a rally protesting the deportation of Kilmar Abrego Garcia, saying that there was "evidence of fascism" and accusing the Trump administration of "intentionally targeting not just immigrants, but those who exercise free speech in criticizing this government and the actions of foreign governments". During the 2026 legislative session, Acevero supported a bill to ban counties from entering into 287(g) program agreements with ICE.

=== Israel ===
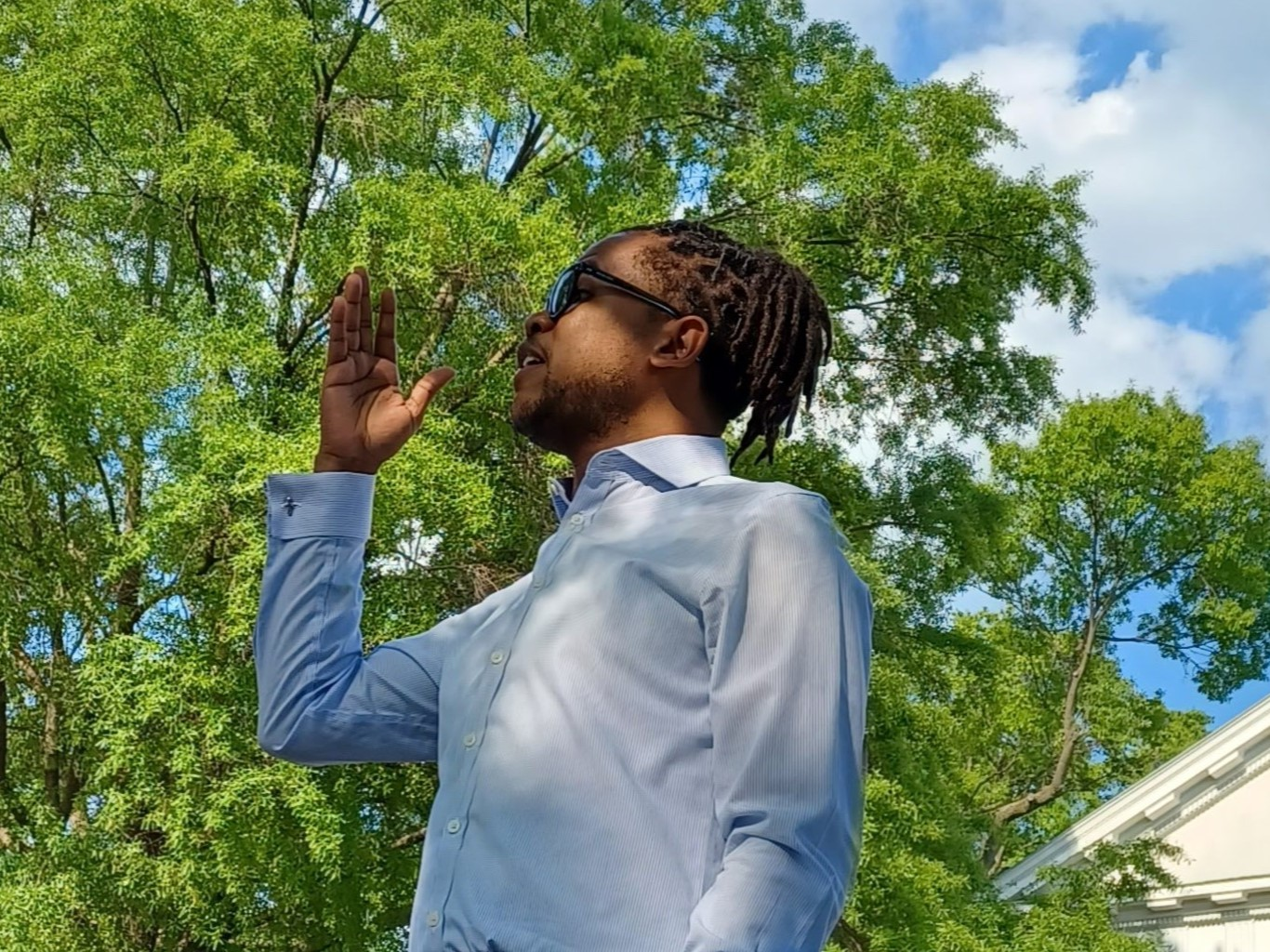
Acevero speaks to a group of pro-Palestine protesters at the University of Maryland during the Gaza war

During the 2024 legislative session, Acevero introduced a resolution calling on Maryland's congressional delegation to support a ceasefire in the Gaza war. In 2025, he introduced the Not On Our Dime Act, which would require the Maryland Secretary of State to remove nonprofit organizations from the state's Registry of Charitable Solicitation if they knowingly support Israeli settlement activity.

=== Redistricting ===
In 2019, Acevero was the lone dissenting vote in the Maryland General Assembly on a motion to allow Republican legislators to introduce a bill to change the boundaries of Maryland's 6th and 8th congressional districts due to a U.S. District Court for the District of Maryland ruling. Due to the timing of this legislation and because it did not adhere to the Court's recommendation of using a nonpartisan redistricting commission to draw the new borders, Acevero could not support the bill in its introduced form.

In 2021, Acevero was the only Democrat in the entire Maryland General Assembly to vote against House Bill 1, the legislature's congressional redistricting plan, citing concerns of the heavy use of gerrymandering and splitting up of communities. He also voted present on amendments to replace the map created by the Legislative Redistricting Advisory Commission with one drawn by the Maryland Citizens Redistricting Commission. He called on legislators from both parties to support the For the People Act, due to its creation of state-level commissions for drawing Congressional Lines. In 2022, the Maryland Congressional Map was ruled unconstitutional, marking the first time a Democratic-drawn map has been struck down by a court during this redistricting cycle. The Maryland judge called it a "product of extreme partisan gerrymandering."

=== Social issues ===
In 2019, Acevero helped write a bill regarding diaper-changing stations in men's restrooms and worked on school funding issues.

In 2020, Acevero co-sponsored legislation to look into the possibility of distributing reparations to the descendants of enslaved Africans in Maryland.

In May 2023, Acevero and delegate Ashanti Martinez signed onto a letter condemning the censure of two transgender legislators—Zooey Zephyr and Mauree Turner—in Montana and Oklahoma. In April 2025, Acevero participated in and spoke at protests outside the U.S. Supreme Court during oral arguments in Mahmoud v. Taylor.

=== Universal basic income ===
Acevero supports universal basic income, introducing legislation during the 2019 legislative session to direct 25% of the income generated from medical and recreational cannabis taxation is redirected into an investment account and the returns are then proportionally given to the citizens of Maryland. House Bill 1089 was referred to the House Appropriations Committee but did not move out of committee. Acevero called the idea as a "form of social security, and it is one of the most transformative policies that we can enact at the state and federal level to put a dent in extreme poverty," and pointed to Alaska's use of it to combat income inequality.

== Personal life ==
Acevero is openly gay.

In June 2026, Acevero was involved in a fight with Gino Renne, the president of United Food and Commercial Workers Local 1994 MCGEO. Following the incident, Acevero released a statement saying that he "had to use physical force" to defend himself after Renne shouted expletives at him and "menacingly" advanced toward him, and would be pressing charges against Renne. Renne disputed Acevero's statement, saying that he approached the legislator after a union staffer confronted him about passing out campaign literature past the "no electioneering" point at the Gaithersburg voting site. He also stated that he was wearing hearing aids and moved closer to Acevero to better hear him amid the commotion, that he "never swung on him", and would be filing a complaint against Acevero. In August 2026, the state dropped its charges against Acevero and Renne, with Frederick County assistant state's attorney Tammy Leache describing the incident as a "mutual fight" in which both defendants were at fault.

== Electoral history ==
Maryland House of Delegates District 39 Democratic Primary Election, 2022
Party	Candidate	Votes	%
Democratic	Lesley J. Lopez	7,847	29.3
Democratic	Gabriel Acevero	7,480	27.9
Democratic	Kirill Reznik	6,816	25.4
Democratic	Clint L. Sobratti	4,663	17.40

Maryland House of Delegates District 39 General Election, 2022
Party	Candidate	Votes	%
Democratic	Lesley J. Lopez	23,282	33.2
Democratic	Gabriel Acevero	23,104	33.0
Democratic	Kirill Reznik	22,292	31.8
Write-In		1,259	1.8

== See also ==
- List of Democratic Socialists of America who have held office in the United States
