= Kirill Reznik =

American politician (born 1974)

- Кіріл Резнік

Member of the Maryland House of Delegates from the 39th district
- In office October 2, 2007 – March 21, 2023
- Appointed by: Martin O'Malley
- Preceded by: Nancy J. King
- Succeeded by: W. Gregory Wims

Personal details
- Born: August 9, 1974 (age 52) Kiev, Ukrainian SSR, Soviet Union
- Party: Democratic
- Spouse: Jennifer Kramer
- Education: BA from Florida International University / MA & JD from American University
- Occupation: Attorney/International Development

Kirill Reznik (Note: Ukrainian: Кіріл Резнік, romanized: Kiril Reznik) (born August 9, 1974) is an American politician from Maryland and a member of the Democratic Party. He was previously a member of the Maryland House of Delegates from District 39 from 2007 to 2023, resigning to become the Assistant Secretary for Inter-Departmental Data Integration for the Maryland Department of Human Services.

== Background ==
Kirill Reznik was born August 9, 1974 in Kyiv. Reznik's family immigrated to the United States in 1978 when he was 4 years old. His family settled in Miami Beach, Florida. Reznik attended Dade County Public Schools, graduating from North Miami Beach Senior High School in 1992. Reznik attended Florida International University, where he served in the student government alongside future political journalist Steve Benen, graduating with a B.A. in international relations and a minor in economics in 1995. Later, Reznik went on to attend American University and received his M.A. in international peace and conflict resolution from the School of International Service in 1998, and received his J.D. in 2003 from American University's Washington College of Law. After graduation, Reznik was admitted to the Maryland Bar in 2004 and the District of Columbia Bar in 2005.

== Professional history ==
Reznik's professional experience includes working in international development and foreign aid programs since 1994. Focusing specifically in the areas of democracy, civil society, and economic development. Reznik has had experience with implementing international development programs throughout the world for well respected implementing organizations and companies such as ACDI/VOCA, American Councils for International Education, Center for International Private Enterprise, AECOM PADCO, and The QED Group, LLC for donors organizations such as USAID, World Bank, and United Nations. As of 2014 Reznik was employed by CAMRIS International where he served as the Director of Operations.

In addition, Reznik has practiced law in Montgomery County for the firm of Weinberg & Jacobs focusing on exempt organizations, estate planning, and small business.

== Political activism ==
Reznik became actively involved with the local Democratic Party in Montgomery County, Maryland in 2004 by joining the Montgomery County Young Democrats. Through his involvement, Reznik eventually went on to be Executive Vice President, and subsequently, President of the Montgomery County Young Democrats, as well as the National Committeeman for the Young Democrats of Maryland, and the Deputy Director of the Young Democrats of America's mid-Atlantic region.

In 2005, Reznik volunteered to be the District 39 Coordinator for then-Mayor Martin O'Malley in his run for Governor of Maryland. The O'Malley–Anthony Brown ticket won the Governorship of Maryland by a vote of 52.7%–46.2% from incumbent Governor Bob Ehrlich. The margin of victory in District 39 was 59.85%–39.10%.

In 2006, Reznik successfully ran to represent the Democrats of Legislative District 39 on the Montgomery County Democratic Central Committee, the local Democratic Party. During his service, Reznik successfully recruited more precinct chairs and vice chairs in recent history for District 39, and successfully helped run the 2006 Maryland Democratic Coordinated Campaign in District 39.

Following the 2022 Russian invasion of Ukraine, Reznik took action in the state legislature, supporting legislation to divest investments in Russia from the Maryland state government pension plan, and sponsoring a resolution expressing solidarity with the people of Ukraine.

In the 2022 Democratic primary, Reznik and other members of the house district campaigned for another Democrat to replace Gabriel Acevero, who nonetheless won reelection to the ticket.

On March 14, 2023, Reznik announced that he would resign from the Maryland House of Delegates on March 21, to serve as the Assistant Secretary for Inter-Departmental Data Integration for the Maryland Department of Human Services.

== Maryland House of Delegates ==
=== First term (2007–2011) ===
After the retirement of State Senator Patrick J. Hogan, and ascension of Maryland State Delegate Nancy J. King to fill Senator Hogan's Senate seat, Reznik was nominated by the Montgomery County Democratic Central Committee, and appointed by Governor O'Malley, to fill Nancy King's seat for the remainder of her term on October 2, 2007.

During his first term, Reznik has sponsored the following legislation that has successfully been enacted as Maryland law:

- HB 527/2008 - Task Force to Study the Procurement of Health and Social Services by State Agencies
- HB 795/2008 - Establishment of and regulation by State Athletic Commission of professional and amateur Mixed Martial Arts events
- HB 910/2008 - Disclosure of medical records in Children In Need of Assistance (CINA) Proceedings
- HB 374/2009 - Establishment of licensure renewal requirements for radiology professionals
- HB 1135/2009 - Provides employees of Maryland-National Capital Parks & Planning Commission workers' compensation presumption for Lyme Disease.
- HB 531/2010 - Extension of Task Force to Study the Procurement of Health and Social Services by State Agencies
- HB 646/2010 - Bans the use of corded window blinds in foster homes, family day care facilities, and child care centers.
- HB 647/2010 - Exempting the Department of Natural Resources from State Procurement law related to conservation service opportunities entered into with nonprofit entities.
- HB 699/2010 - Requiring the State to set hospital reimbursement rates for specific freestanding emergency facilities and altering how the state can issue a license for new facilities.
- HB 870/2010 - Prohibiting the performance of specific cosmetic surgical procedures in unaccredited medical offices or facilities.
- HB 1017/2010 - Requiring health insurance to cover visits for obesity evaluation and management and visits for and costs of developmental screening for child wellness services.

=== Second term (2011–2015) ===
On November 2, 2010, Reznik was elected to the Maryland House of Delegates to represent District 39.

During his second term, to date Reznik has sponsored the following legislation that has successfully been enacted as Maryland law:

- HB 87/2011 - Restricting the ability of employers to use an individual's credit history against them in hiring or retention.
- HB 440/2012 - Debarred entities who do business with Iran from doing business with the State of Maryland.
- HB 448/2012 - Requires the State to only contract for electronics recycling with certified recyclers so harmful equipment or chemicals are not dumped domestically or abroad.
- HB 456/2012 - Expanded access of the Small Business Reserve Program to a large number of small businesses.
- HB 540/2012 - Establishes requirements for the proper handling of the body of a decedent by funeral establishments and crematories in response to recent scandals involving the treatment of remains of Maryland veterans awaiting burial at Arlington National Cemetery.
- HB 833/2012 - Enables Licensed Respiratory Care Practitioners to have the right to practice within the scope of their license, including in a sleep laboratory.

=== Assignments ===
- Committee on Health and Government Operations - Standing Committee of the Maryland House of Delegates - 2007–2023
  - Subcommittee on Minority Health Disparities - 2007-2011
  - Subcommittee on Government Operations - 2007–2023
  - Subcommittee on Health Facilities and Occupations - 2011–2023
- Joint Committee on Federal Relations - 2011–2023
- Joint Committee on Access to Mental Health Services - 2011–2023
- Maryland State Drug and Alcohol Abuse Council - 2008–2023 - Representative of the Maryland House of Delegates
- Maryland Commission on Autism - 2009–2023 - Representative of the Maryland House of Delegates
  - Chair, Workgroup on Finances and Resources
- Maryland Alliance for Responsible Gambling - 2011–2023 - Representative of the Maryland House of Delegates
- Task Force to Study the Procurement of Health and Social Services by State Agencies - 2011 - One of two representatives of the Maryland House of Delegates

== Electoral history ==
- 2014 Race for Maryland House of Delegates–39th District

Voters to choose three:

Name	Votes	Percent	Outcome
Charles E. Barkley, Democratic	15,247	23.02%	Won
Shane Robinson, Democratic	14,179	21.41%	Won
Kirill Reznik, Democratic	13,788	20.82%	Won
Gloria Chang, Republican	8,117	12.25%	Lost
Al Phillips, Republican	7,565	11.42%	Lost
Xiangfei Chang, Republican	7,340	11.08%	Lost

- 2010 Race for Maryland House of Delegates–39th District

Voters to choose three:

Name	Votes	Percent	Outcome
Charles E. Barkley, Democratic	18,060	23.54%	Won
Kirill Reznik, Democratic	16,199	21.12%	Won
Shane Robinson, Democratic	15,961	20.81%	Won
Jim Pettit, Republican	9,695	12.64%	Lost
Bill Witham, Republican	8,482	11.06%	Lost
Al Phillips, Republican	8,482	11.06%	Lost

== Personal life ==
Reznik is an active alumni member of the Tau Epsilon Phi fraternity. As of 2017, he was the Tribune of the organization's Grand Council. In October 2018, he was elected International Counsul (President) of the fraternity.

== Notes ==
Preceded by Nancy J. King	State Delegate, District 39, Maryland State House of Delegates; 2007–2023	Succeeded by TBD
