= Maryland Green Party =

Maryland affiliate of the Green Party

- Co-chair: Renaud Brown
- Co-chair: Vacant
- Secretary: Dana Polson
- Treasurer: Tim Willard
- Founded: August 17, 2000; 26 years ago
- Headquarters: Baltimore, Maryland, U.S. 21233
- Student wing: Young Greens
- Membership (2026): ▼6,227
- Ideology: Green politics
- Political position: Left-wing
- National affiliation: Green Party of the United States
- Colors: Green
- Senate: 0 / 47
- House of Delegates: 0 / 141
- Statewide Officers: 0 / 4
- County Executives: 0 / 15
- County Council / Commission Seats: 0 / 142
- Local offices: 2 (2023)

Website
- www.mdgreens.org

The Maryland Green Party is the state party organization for Maryland of the Green Party of the United States.

The Maryland Green Party qualified as a recognized political party on August 17, 2000, since that time the party has grown to 9,350 members as of April 2018. In November of 2018, outgoing Delegate Shane Robinson switched his party affiliation from Democrat to Green, becoming Maryland's first Green Delegate.

== Electoral history ==
During the 2006 elections, U.S. Senate candidate Kevin Zeese became the first Maryland Green Party candidate for statewide office to be invited to debate the major party candidates. Zeese went on to finish third with over 25,000 votes. That same year Green Ed Boyd became the first African-American candidate for Governor of Maryland. He received approximately 15,000 votes.

In November 2007, Gary Hull became the first Green officeholder in Maryland, being elected to the Sharpsburg Town Council.

In April 2007, Mike Cornell was elected to the Columbia City Council, an unincorporated community run by a nonprofit homeowners association known as the Columbia Association in Columbia. Up until 2015, Cornell was one of 10 representatives that form the Columbia Council. Residents elect council representatives from each of Columbia's nine villages and Town Center.

In the November 2007 elections, Dan Robinson was elected to the non-partisan seat of Takoma Park Town Council Ward 3. He finished first of two candidates for one seat with 234 votes or 67.6%. Robinson ran for the same office in 2003 finishing 2nd in a two candidate race with 183 votes, or 35%.

In September 2010, Green Party nominee for U.S. Senate Natasha Pettigrew was killed while biking when she was hit by the driver of a Cadillac Escalade. She was replaced by her mother, Keniss Henry. Henry received 20,717 votes (1.13%).

In January 2015, the Maryland State Board of Elections determined that the party's petition was sufficient and it would be on the ballot through at least 2018.

== Presidential election results ==
Year	Nominee	Votes
1996	Ralph Nader (write-in)	2,606 (0.15)
2000	Ralph Nader	53,768 (2.65%)
2004	David Cobb	3,632 (0.15%)
2008	Cynthia McKinney	4,747 (0.18%)
2012	Jill Stein	17,110 (0.63%)
2016	Jill Stein	33,892 (1.3%)
2020	Howie Hawkins	15,799 (0.52%)
2024	Jill Stein	33,134 (1.09%)

== Elected officials ==
=== Current officials ===
- Anthony Williamson, Broadway Homes Representative (Baltimore City), Resident Advisory Board (2019–present)
- Annie Chambers, Douglass Homes Representative (Baltimore City), Resident Advisory Board (2017–present)

=== Past officials ===
- Shane Robinson, former member of the Maryland House of Delegates
- Michael Cornell
  - Board of Directors Chairman, Village of River Hill (Howard County)
  - Columbia Association Board Member, representing the District of River Hill
- Gary Hull, Town Council Sharpsburg (Washington County)
- Christine Nagle, City Council District 1, College Park (Prince George's County)
- Dan Robinson, Town Council Ward 3, Takoma Park (Montgomery County)
- James Wilkinson, Town Council Mayor Pro Tem, Berwyn Heights (Prince George's County)

== Party organization ==
The following party leaders were elected in July 2022 on 1-year terms:

- Charlotte McBrearty, Co-Chair
- Vacant, Co-Chair
- Mary Rooker, Secretary
- Tim Willard, Treasurer
- Justin Sindall, Membership Coordinator

=== GNC delegates ===
The following delegates represent the state of Maryland in the Green National Committee:

- Renaud Brown, Delegate
- Devonie Doles, Delegate
- Mary Rooker, Delegate

== See also ==
- Green Party of the United States
- 2026 Maryland gubernatorial election
- 2026 Maryland county executive elections
- Maryland gubernatorial elections
- Primary elections in Maryland
- Maryland elections
- Maryland Senate
- Maryland House of Delegates
- 2016 Baltimore mayoral election
