= Shane Robinson (politician) =

American politician (born 1976)

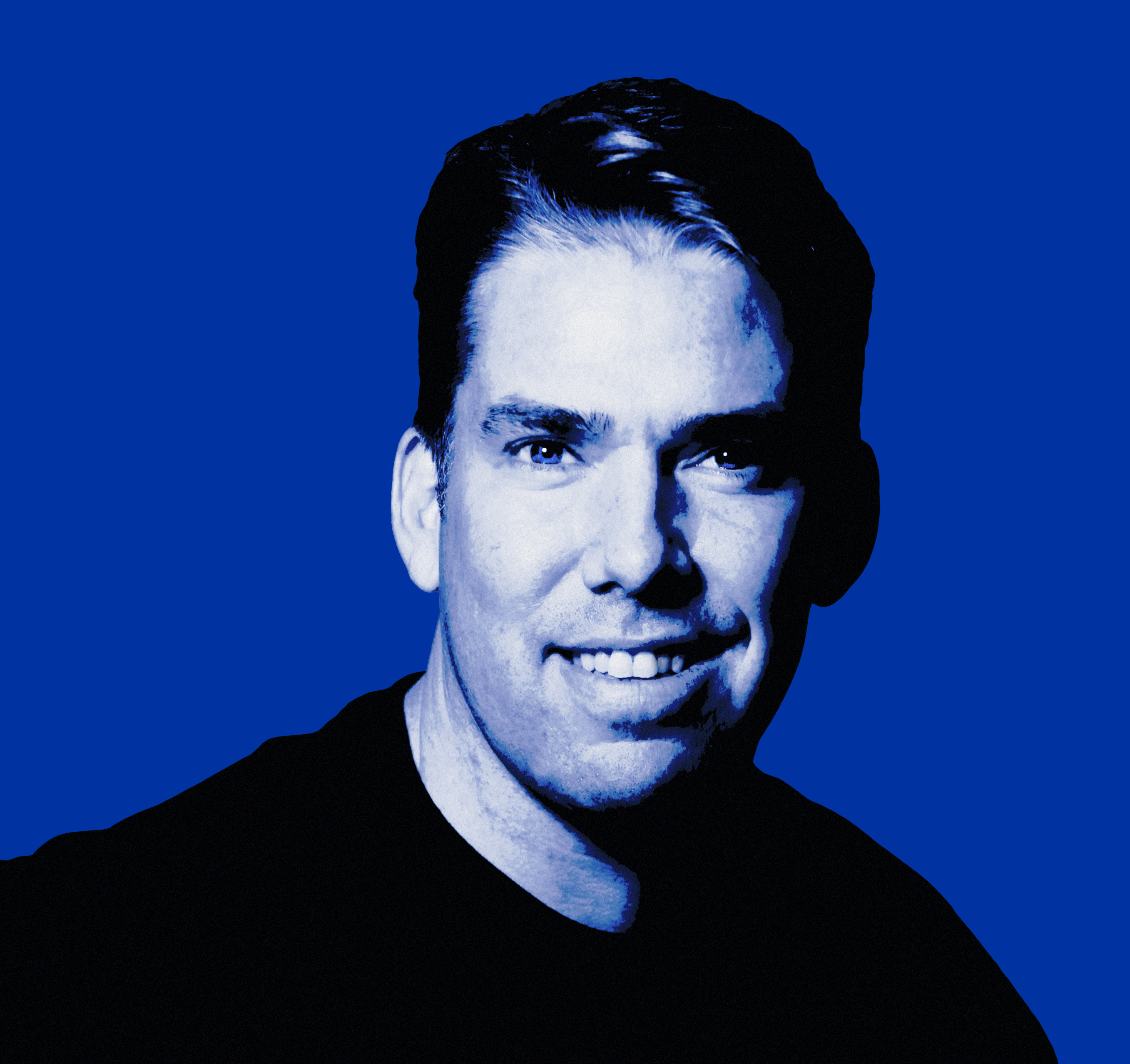

Member of the Maryland House of Delegates from the 39th district
- In office January 12, 2011 – January 9, 2019
- Preceded by: Saqib Ali
- Succeeded by: Gabriel Acevero

Personal details
- Born: December 26, 1976 (age 49) Ahwaz, Iran
- Party: Green (2018–present)
- Other political affiliations: Democratic (before 2018)
- Spouse: Mary King Robinson
- Children: 2
- Education: University of Nevada, Reno

Arash Shane Robinson (born December 26, 1976) is an American politician and a former member of the Maryland House of Delegates representing District 39 in Montgomery County, Maryland.

== Background ==
=== Early life ===
Robinson was born on December 26, 1976, to American parents living in Ahwaz, Iran. As a child Robinson lived in Bolivia, the nation of his mother's birth, as well as Brazil, Maryland, Nevada, and Poland. He later graduated from Reno High School.

=== University ===
He attended the University of Nevada, Reno, earning dual degrees in Spanish and biology in 2000. While in college, Robinson worked as a wildland firefighter for the United States Forest Service and later joined the Peace Corps, serving in rural Zambia from 2002 to 2005.

=== Return to United States ===
From 2005 to 2006 he worked as an English Instructor in South Korea. Following his return to the United States, he worked for a number of organizations, including the AIDS Project of Southern Vermont, the Iracambi Atlantic Rainforest Research and Conservation Center which is located in Minas Gerais, Brazil, and where Robinson resided for six months, and afterwards for the Coulter Companies (now known as MCI USA) for whom he helped manage non-profit clients and was the director of sustainability. During this period, Robinson also began work on a graduate degree in sustainable development, which he earned in 2011. Robinson was co-owner of Anthropocene Solutions, a sustainability, nonprofit management, and government affairs firm, and was co-executive director of The Ehlers-Danlos Society.

In 2021 Robinson returned to school to become a teacher, and is currently a learning support math and Spanish teacher at James Buchanan High School in Mercersburg, Pennsylvania.

He also works on the side as a National Ski Patrol alpine patroller. He is divorced and has two children.

== House of Delegates ==
Robinson ran for one of three seats in District 39 in the Maryland House of Delegates in the fall of 2010. He came in third, behind incumbents Charles E. Barkley and Kirill Reznik. He was sworn into the Maryland House of Delegates on January 12, 2011, and assigned to serve on the House Environmental Matters Committee and its Land Use and Ethics Subcommittee and Environment Subcommittee. In his first year in the legislature, he was also appointed to serve as a Trustee of the Chesapeake Bay Trust and as a member of the Task Force to Study the Establishment of a Statewide Spay/Neuter Fund.

Robinson was reelected for a second term in the fall of 2014. He came in second, behind incumbent Charles E. Barkley and ahead of incumbent Kirill Reznik. During his second term he was elected Chair of the House of Delegates Delegation from Montgomery County. Robinson and 29 other delegates tried to get the Housing Department Chief to resign in Aug 2015.

On May 25, 2017, Robinson filed his candidacy for reelection as Delegate. In June 2018, he lost the primary election by 154 votes. Following the general election, Robinson switched his party affiliation to the Green Party.

== Political positions ==
Robinson co-sponsored a bill to prohibit wage discrimination based on gender identity. He also co-sponsored a bill to authorize same-sex marriage. Robinson is an advocate for alternative energy he is a strong supporter of the Off Fossil Fuels Act which would require Maryland to achieve 100% renewable energy by 2035. He sponsored a law to ban fracking, which passed in Maryland. He was awarded Green Champion by the Maryland League of Conservation Voters for his work in promoting environmental causes in 2017. He voted yes on a bill to reduce green house gas emissions. Robinson is a vegan, and has said that animal rights are important to him. He has advocated against the competitive hunting of Cownose Rays. He also has sponsored a bill to end training on live animals at Johns Hopkins. Furthermore, he advocates limiting the use of antibiotics in livestock.

Robinson voted in favor of legislation which would require the fingerprinting of gun buyers, prevent purchasing of guns by the mentally ill, a ban on assault weapons, and banning magazines that hold over 10 bullets. Robinson co-sponsored legislation to prohibit price hikes in generic drugs in Maryland, the legislation passed. Robinson co-sponsored legislation to raise the minimum wage in Maryland. He also supported a bill which would require public school teachers paying labour union fees. He voted yes on a bill to require certain employers to provide paid sick leave. Robinson voted yes on a bill to repeal the death penalty.

=== Endorsements ===
In 2014, Robinson was endorsed by Equality Maryland, Maryland State and Washington, DC AFL-CIO, Maryland State Education Association – NEA, NARAL Pro-Choice Maryland, National Organization for Women, Progressive Maryland, Sierra Club Maryland Chapter, and United Food & Commercial Workers. Robinson endorsed Ben Shnider in the race for District 3 County Council. He also condemned a petition to limit early endorsements. Tim Willard, of the Montgomery County Green Party, and Meg Robbins, of Food & Water Watch encouraged state legislators to support Shane Robinson for his work on supporting the Off Fossil Fuels Act.

== Electoral history ==
- 2010 Race for Maryland House of Delegates–39th District

Voters to choose three:

Name	Votes	Percent	Outcome
Charles E. Barkley, Democratic	18,060	23.54%	Won
Kirill Reznik, Democratic	16,199	21.12%	Won
Shane Robinson, Democratic	15,961	20.81%	Won
Jim Pettit, Republican	9,695	12.64%	Lost
Bill Witham, Republican	8,482	11.06%	Lost
Al Phillips, Republican	8,482	11.06%	Lost

- 2014 Race for Maryland House of Delegates–39th District

Voters to choose three:

Name	Votes	Percent	Outcome
Charles E. Barkley, Democratic	15,247	23%	Won
Shane Robinson, Democratic	14,179	21.4%	Won
Kirill Reznik, Democratic	13,788	20.8%	Won
Gloria Chang, Republican	8,117	12.3%	Lost
Al Phillips, Republican	7,565	11.4%	Lost
Xiangfei Chang, Republican	7,340	11.1%	Lost
