= Maryland Legislative District 39 =

American legislative district

Maryland's legislative district 39
- Represents part of Montgomery County
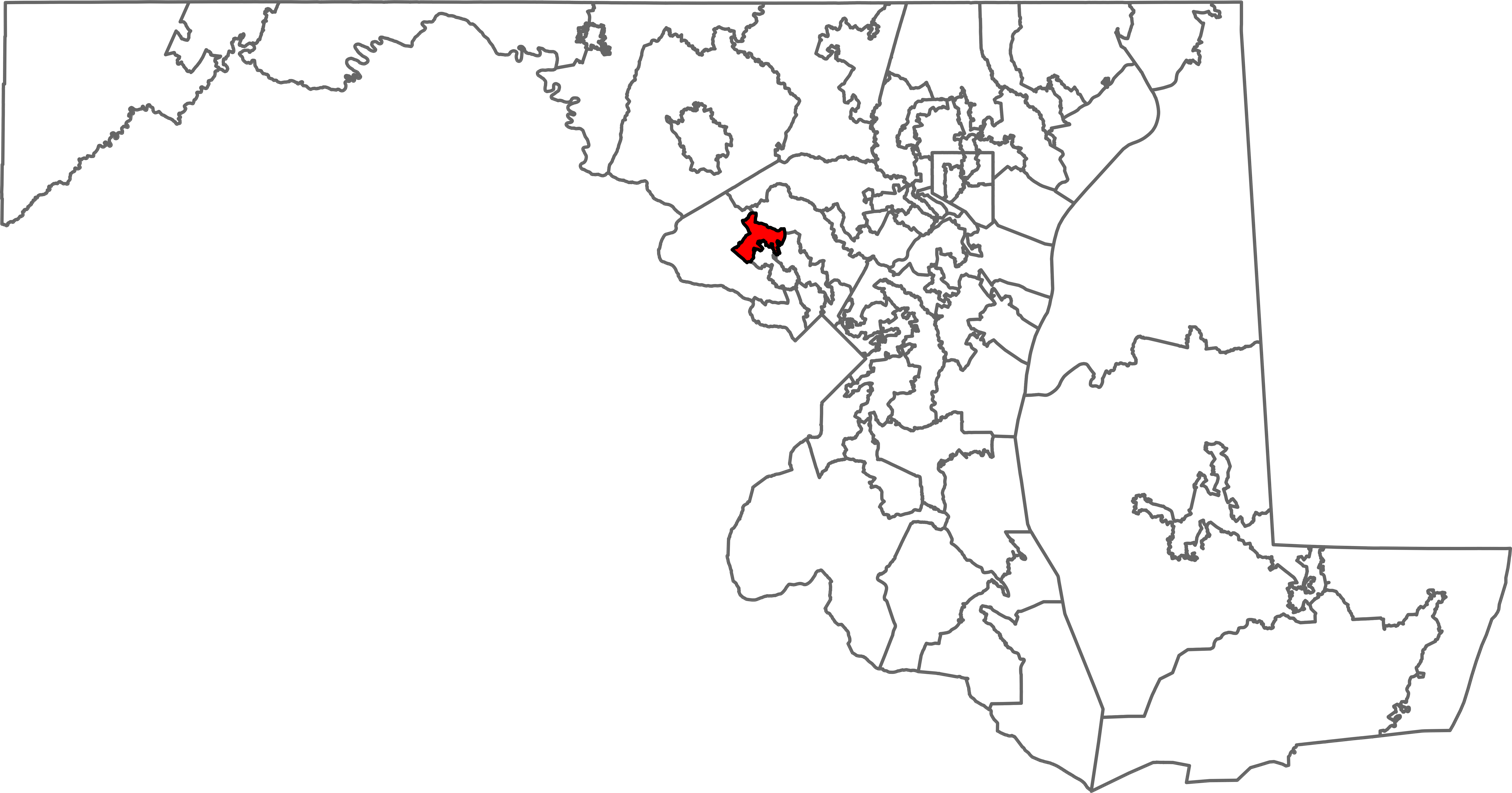
- Senator: Nancy J. King (D)
- Delegate(s): Gabriel Acevero (D); Lesley J. Lopez (D); W. Gregory Wims (D)
- Registration: 59.5% Democratic; 15.0% Republican; 23.8% unaffiliated
- Demographics: 28.3% White; 23.3% Black/African American; 0.9% Native American; 18.3% Asian; 0.0% Hawaiian/Pacific Islander; 16.4% Other race; 12.6% Two or more races; 28.7% Hispanic
- Population (2020): 131,608
- Voting-age population: 98,813
- Registered voters: 75,693

Maryland Legislative District 39 is one of 47 districts in the state for the Maryland General Assembly. It covers part of Montgomery County. The district is represented by three delegates in the Maryland House of Delegates.

== Demographic characteristics ==
As of the 2020 United States census, the district had a population of 131,608, of whom 98,813 (75.1%) were of voting age. The racial makeup of the district was 37,297 (28.3%) White, 30,707 (23.3%) African American, 1,246 (0.9%) Native American, 24,070 (18.3%) Asian, 37 (0.0%) Pacific Islander, 21,593 (16.4%) from some other race, and 16,625 (12.6%) from two or more races. Hispanic or Latino of any race were 37,818 (28.7%) of the population.

The district had 75,693 registered voters as of October 17, 2020, of whom 18,009 (23.8%) were registered as unaffiliated, 11,372 (15.0%) were registered as Republicans, 45,057 (59.5%) were registered as Democrats, and 778 (1.0%) were registered to other parties.

== Political representation ==
The district is represented for the 2023–2027 legislative term in the State Senate by Nancy J. King (D) and in the House of Delegates by Gabriel Acevero (D), Lesley J. Lopez (D), and W. Gregory Wims (D).
