= Patrick J. Hogan (Maryland politician) =

American politician

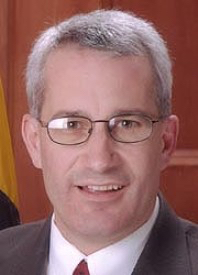

Vice Chair, Maryland State Board of Elections
- In office 2014 – June 30, 2021
- Succeeded by: Justin A. Williams

Vice-Chancellor for Government Relations, University System of Maryland
- In office August 10, 2007 – September 30, 2015
- Preceded by: Joseph C. Bryce
- Succeeded by: Patrick N. Hogan

Member of the Maryland Senate from the 39th district
- In office January 11, 1995 – August 10, 2007
- Preceded by: redistricted
- Succeeded by: Nancy J. King (D)

Personal details
- Born: September 22, 1962 (age 64) Pittsburgh, Pennsylvania
- Party: Democratic (2000–)
- Other political affiliations: Republican (before 2000)
- Spouse: Married
- Children: 2
- Education: Mt. Lebanon High School, Mt. Lebanon, Pennsylvania
- Alma mater: Indiana University of Pennsylvania, B.S. (marketing), 1989
- Occupation: Lobbyist. Computer consultant, 1995-2007. Sporting-goods store owner, 1985-1990.

Patrick J. "PJ" Hogan (born September 22, 1962) is an American lobbyist and politician from Maryland and a member of the Democratic Party. He was the Vice Chair of the Maryland State Board of Elections from 2014 to 2021. Hogan was a member of the Maryland Senate from District 39, which covers parts of Montgomery County, from January 11, 1995, to August 10, 2007. He was initially elected as a Republican but switched to the Democratic Party in 2000. Hogan resigned from the Senate to become the Vice-Chancellor for Government Relations for the University System of Maryland from August 2007 to September 30, 2015. The position has been described as the chief lobbyist for the university system. He left the university system to work as a lobbyist in Annapolis.

== Election results ==
1994 General Election Results, District 39 State Senator (Vote For One)
Name	Votes	Percent	Outcome
Patrick J. Hogan, Rep.	15,101	54%	Won
Gene W. Counihan, Dem.	13,072	46%	Lost

1998 General Election Results, District 39 State Senator (Vote For One)
Name	Votes	Percent	Outcome
Patrick J. Hogan, Rep.	17,082	55%	Won
Maurice Miles, Dem.	14,187	45%	Lost

2002 General Election Results, District 39 State Senator (Vote For One)
Name	Votes	Percent	Outcome
Patrick J. Hogan, Dem.	19,099	66.19%	Won
Robin Ficker, Rep.	9,689	33.58%	Lost
Other Write-Ins	65	0.23%	

2006 General Election Results, District 39 State Senator (Vote For One)
Name	Votes	Percent	Outcome
Patrick J. Hogan, Dem.	23,274	98.5%	Won
Other Write-Ins	358	1.5%	
