= Montgomery Village, Maryland =

- Census-designated place
- Montgomery Village Foundation, Inc.
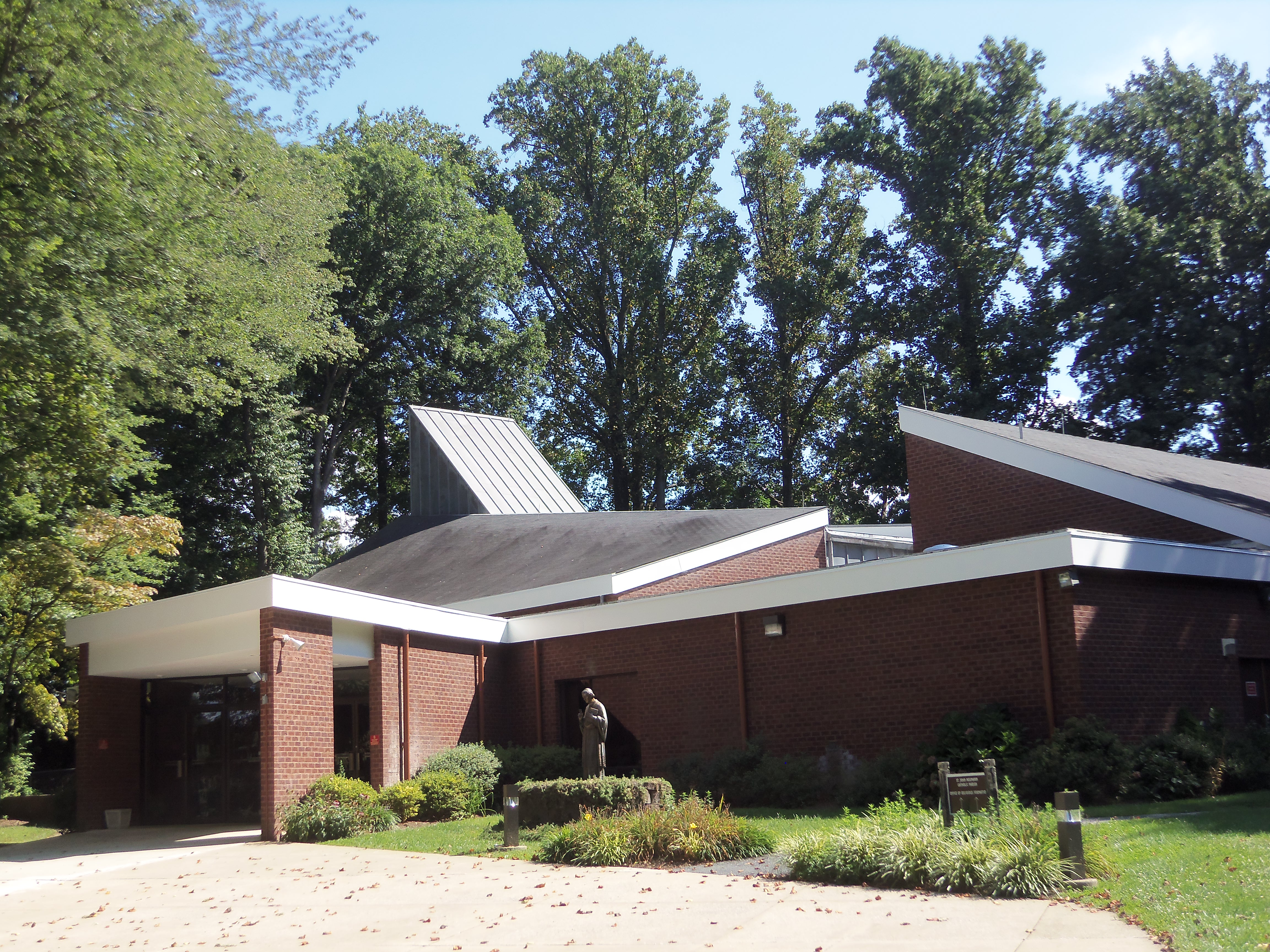
- The Saint John Neumann Church in August 2013

- Flag Seal Wordmark
- Nicknames: "The Village", "MV", "MVF"
- Location of Montgomery Village in Montgomery County, Maryland
- Coordinates: 39°10′29″N 77°12′20″W
- Country: United States
- State: Maryland
- County: Montgomery
- Created: 1962
- Foundation incorporated: October 17, 1966
- Settled: September 25, 1967

Government
  - Type: 501(c)(4) nonprofit corporation
  - President: Doniele Ayres
  - Vice president: Susan Prince
  - Executive vice president: Mike Conroy
  - Corporate secretary: Christopher Hitchens
  - Office manager: Tom Wills

Area
  - Total: 3.96 sq mi (10.26 km^{2})
  - Land: 3.88 sq mi (10.05 km^{2})
  - Water: 0.081 sq mi (0.21 km^{2})
- Elevation: 410 ft (120 m)

Population (2020)
  - Total: 34,893
  - Density: 8,988.3/sq mi (3,470.42/km^{2})
- Time zone: UTC−5 (Eastern [EST])
  - Summer (DST): UTC−4 (EDT)
- ZIP codes: 20877, 20879, 20886
- Area codes: 301, 240
- FIPS code: 24-53325
- GNIS feature ID: 2389499
- Website: www.montgomeryvillage.com

Montgomery Village is a census-designated place (CDP) in Montgomery County, Maryland, United States, and a northern suburb of Washington, D.C. It is a large, planned suburban community, developed in the late 1960s and 1970s just outside Gaithersburg's city limits. Montgomery Village's population was 34,893 at the time of the 2020 U.S. census, and it is a part of the Washington metropolitan area.

== History ==
=== 1960s ===
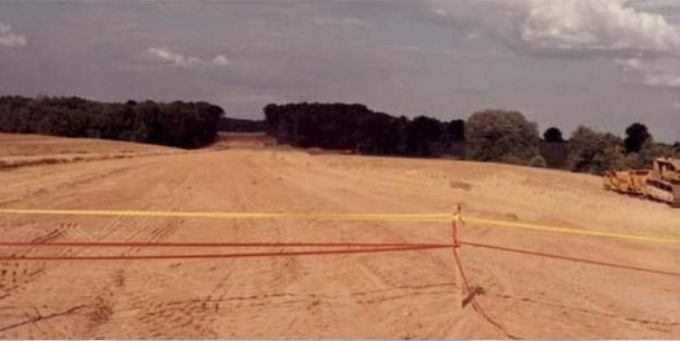
Montgomery Village Avenue in 1966

Montgomery Village was created in 1962 by Kettler Brothers, Inc. The vision for a planned community in Gaithersburg is credited to architect Charles Kettler, who incorporated Kettler Brothers with his brothers Milton and Clarence in 1952. The first land purchase was the Walker Farm in 1962. Subsequent purchases were the Thomas Farm, The Mills Farm, The French Farm, The Patton Farm, The Fulks Farm, The Wilson Farm, and The James Walter Deppa property. The Walker Farm was the largest of all the properties the Kettlers bought. It was 412 acres (1.67 km^{2}) and now is Walkers Choice, Cider Mill, Horizon Run, Christopher Court, Dockside, Nathan's Hill, Millrace, the Montgomery Village Library, Montgomery Village Day-Care Center, the Off-Price Centers, Bayberry, the Verandahs, Grover's Forge, Lake Whetstone, South Valley Park, and part of Lakeforest Mall.

On February 28, 1966, the Kettler brothers broke ground for the first house in Montgomery Village. The first model homes were opened in Lakeside of Whetstone in August 1967. The first residents of Montgomery Village moved in on September 25, 1967, in Goshenside.

The Montgomery Village Foundation was incorporated on October 17, 1966. In 1968, the Whetstone Community Center opened, as did Whetstone Elementary and Montgomery Village Junior High schools.

=== 1970s ===
In 1970, The Village Mall opened, which is now the Village Shopping Center on Montgomery Village Avenue. Then in 1971, a Holiday Inn was opened. In 1973, bus service to Washington, D.C., began.

=== 1990s ===
In 1998, Montgomery Village began using its own ZIP code, 20886.

=== 2000s ===
In 2007, Montgomery Village's YMCA swimming pool closed.

=== 2010s ===
The Montgomery Village Golf Club closed November 30, 2014 and will be turned into a neighborhood.

=== 2020s ===
Montgomery Village is seeing a surge in redevelopment. A firm has purchased the golf course and is approved to move forward with the Bloom Montgomery Village neighborhood featuring an 80-acre park and dog park, new single-family and townhomes. The groundbreaking is scheduled for March 2020 with the first model homes opening in fall 2020.

Montgomery Village currently has a farmer's market on Saturdays from May through October, free summer concerts selling beer & wine, 3 summer youth swim teams, All Comers Swim Meet, 3 Community Centers (2 are rentable), annual art show, 4 July parade and carnival and 5k, A great Pumpkin race and fall festival, Brunch with a Bunny, flashlight Easter Egg Hunt, seasonal indoor/outdoor flea markets, Holiday craft bazaar, Annual Thanksgiving morning workout, Community Christmas Tree lighting, Breakfast with Santa, Holiday Toys for Tots Concert, a full year-round recreation program, summer youth camp program, an Active Seniors group with weekly activities, daddy-daughter Valentines Day Dance, wine & paint nights, Bingo nights, September annual dog swim (in one of the many pools) several tennis courts, 7 seasonal swimming pools, a heated pool (extends summer swimming season) paved bike and walking trails, ponds for non-motorized boating and fishing, pedestrian tunnels located under busy roads throughout for pedestrian safety, several parks and tot lots, protected natural streams, public transportation, a new renovated County Library, 2 exits to I-270 (Montgomery Village Ave & Watkins Mill Rd/2020)

== Geography ==
Although Montgomery Village is an unincorporated area, its boundaries are defined according to Montgomery County zoning rules and by its own unique ZIP code. Montgomery Village can use Gaithersburg addresses even though the village is outside city limits. Montgomery Village is recognized by the U.S. Census Bureau and by the U.S. Geological Survey as a census-designated place.

According to the U.S. Census Bureau, the place has a total area of 4.055 square miles (10.50 km^{2}), of which 3.974 square miles (10.29 km^{2}) is land and 0.081 square miles (0.21 km^{2}) (1.99%) is water.

== Education ==
Montgomery Village is served by Montgomery County Public Schools.

=== Elementary schools ===
- Goshen Elementary School
- South Lake Elementary School
- Stedwick Elementary School
- Strawberry Knoll Elementary School
- Watkins Mill Elementary School
- Whetstone Elementary School

=== Middle schools ===
- Forest Oak Middle School
- Montgomery Village Middle School
- Neelsville Middle School
- Shady Grove Middle School

=== High schools ===
- Watkins Mill High School
- Gaithersburg High School

== Demographics ==
Historical population
Census	Pop.	Note	%±
1980	18,725		—
1990	32,315		72.6%
2000	38,051		17.8%
2010	32,032		−15.8%
2020	34,893		8.9%
source: 2010–2020

=== 2020 census ===
As of the 2020 census, Montgomery Village had a population of 34,893. The median age was 36.4 years. 24.4% of residents were under the age of 18 and 12.3% of residents were 65 years of age or older. For every 100 females there were 94.1 males, and for every 100 females age 18 and over there were 90.4 males age 18 and over.

100.0% of residents lived in urban areas, while 0.0% lived in rural areas.

There were 11,881 households in Montgomery Village, of which 36.7% had children under the age of 18 living in them. Of all households, 47.3% were married-couple households, 16.8% were households with a male householder and no spouse or partner present, and 29.7% were households with a female householder and no spouse or partner present. About 22.9% of all households were made up of individuals and 8.7% had someone living alone who was 65 years of age or older.

There were 12,331 housing units, of which 3.6% were vacant. The homeowner vacancy rate was 1.0% and the rental vacancy rate was 5.6%.

Racial composition as of the 2020 census
Race	Number	Percent
White	9,726	27.9%
Black or African American	8,176	23.4%
American Indian and Alaska Native	451	1.3%
Asian	3,843	11.0%
Native Hawaiian and Other Pacific Islander	15	0.0%
Some other race	7,704	22.1%
Two or more races	4,978	14.3%
Hispanic or Latino (of any race)	12,888	36.9%

=== 2010 census ===
As of the 2010 U.S. census, there were 32,032 people and 11,751 households residing in the area. The population density was 8,018 people per square mile (3,096 people/km^{2}). There were 12,471 housing units.

The median income for a household in the area was $76,526. The per capita income for the area was $35,389.

=== 2000 census ===
As of the 2000 U.S. census, there were 38,051 people, 14,142 households, and 9,729 families residing in the area. The population density was 5,875.1 inhabitants per square mile (2,268.4/km^{2}). There were 14,548 housing units at an average density of 2,246.2 per square mile (867.3/km^{2}). The ethnic makeup of the area was 38.1% White, 24.0% Hispanic or Latino of any race, 23.2% African American, 10.7% Asian, 0.0% Pacific Islander, 0.5% from other races, 0.2% Native American, and 2.9% from two or more races.

There were 14,142 households, out of which 36.8% had children under the age of 18 living with them, 52.5% were married couples living together, 12.6% had a female householder with no husband present, and 31.2% were non-families. 24.0% of all households were made up of individuals, and 4.9% had someone living alone who was 65 years of age or older. The average household size was 2.68 and the average family size was 3.21.

In the area, the population was spread out, with 26.6% under the age of 18, 7.5% from 18 to 24, 35.4% from 25 to 44, 23.5% from 45 to 64, and 7.0% who were 65 years of age or older. The median age was 34 years. For every 100 females there were 90.9 males. For every 100 females age 21 and over, there were 87.7 males.

The median income for a household in the area was $66,828, and the median income for a family was $74,920 (these figures had risen to $89,601 and $97,837 respectively as of a 2008 estimate). Males had a median income of $50,046 versus $38,665 for females. The per capita income for the area was $29,620. About 3.9% of families and 7.1% of the population were below the poverty line, including 6.6% of those under age 18 and 3.4% of those age 65 or over.
