= Same-sex marriage in Bermuda =

Same-sex marriage is not recognised in Bermuda, but was legal for a period of five years between 2017 and 2022–except between 1 June 2018 and 23 November 2018 when a law banning same-sex marriage was in effect. Same-sex marriage first became legal on 5 May 2017, when the Supreme Court of Bermuda ruled that same-sex couples had a legal right to marry. However, a bill to ban same-sex marriage and establish domestic partnerships as a substitute was passed by the Parliament of Bermuda in December 2017 and went into effect on 1 June 2018.

In response to the renewed ban on same-sex marriage, a court challenge was filed opposing the domestic partnership law. On 6 June 2018, the Supreme Court struck down the parts of the law that banned same-sex marriages, but stayed the ruling while the government appealed to the Court of Appeal. The appeals court upheld the right of same-sex couples to marry when it handed down its ruling on 23 November 2018. The government challenged the Court of Appeal's ruling to the Judicial Committee of the Privy Council, which reversed the appeals court's finding on 14 March 2022, and banned same-sex marriage in Bermuda once again. Same-sex marriages performed before that date remain legally recognised. Polling suggests that a majority of Bermudians support the legal recognition of same-sex marriage.

== Legal history ==
=== Background ===
The Bermudian Government first made clear in 2004 that it would not consider recognising civil unions or same-sex marriages. In May 2006, MP Renee Webb tabled a private member's bill seeking to add sexual orientation as prohibited ground of discrimination to the Human Rights Act 1981. However, the bill was dismissed when the Parliament of Bermuda refused to debate it. At the time, social attitudes were such that some gay and lesbian residents chose to emigrate—often to the United Kingdom, where Bermudians and other British Overseas Territories citizens have a right to reside—in order to live more openly. One emigrant noted that same-sex relationships had to be kept secret, with partners introduced only as "friends" and relationships between two Bermudians as being very difficult. Progress came in June 2013, when Parliament passed legislation prohibiting discrimination on the basis of sexual orientation under the Human Rights Act 1981. Although the same month, Premier Craig Cannonier stated that his government would not legalise same-sex marriage in Bermuda: "I can assure you that under my leadership this is not about same-sex marriage, and under my leadership that will not happen."

On 11 February 2016, Attorney General Trevor Moniz said that the government would debate a bill to create civil unions for same-sex couples, though he ruled out the legalisation of same-sex marriage. On 29 February, the government announced that a referendum on same-sex marriage and civil unions was planned. On 12 March, Premier Michael Dunkley announced that the referendum would take place mid-to-late June 2016. The referendum was non-binding, and was described by Dunkley as "only a way to get some clarity on the issue". Voters were asked two questions: "Are you in favour of same-sex marriage in Bermuda?" and "Are you in favour of same-sex civil unions in Bermuda?" The referendum was held on 23 June 2016. Both proposals were rejected by 60–70% of voters though the referendum was legally invalid, as less than 50% of eligible voters turned out. An amendment to section 15 of the Matrimonial Causes Act 1974, which defined marriage as the union of "a man and a woman", was introduced to Parliament following the referendum. The amendment would have overridden the anti-discrimination provisions in the Human Rights Act 1981 and retain language stating that marriage was limited to "a man and a woman". On 8 July 2016, the House of Assembly passed the bill by 20 votes to 10, but on 21 July the Senate rejected the legislation by a 5–6 vote.

In November 2015, the Supreme Court of Bermuda ruled that the same-sex partners of Bermuda residents are entitled to the same immigration rights as opposite-sex spouses, without being subject to immigration-related restrictions. While the government did not indicate whether it would appeal the decision, it requested a suspension of the ruling's implementation in order to assess its broader implications. These included potential impacts on laws governing "bankruptcy, estates, wills, succession, inheritance, health insurance, pensions, and social insurance". The ruling ultimately came into effect on 29 February 2016.

=== 2017 Supreme Court ruling in Godwin ===
In the aftermath of the June 2016 referendum, two same-sex couples indicated they would apply for marriage licenses and challenge the refusal in court. On 6 July, a male couple, Winston Godwin and Greg DeRoche, filed notice of their intent to marry with an accompanying letter from their attorney requesting that the banns be posted within two days. The letter went on to state that unless the registrar notified the parties within two days, proceedings would be initiated in the Supreme Court. On 8 July, the Registrar General's office rejected the application to publish the banns, which prompted the couple's attorney to file a writ asking the Supreme Court to determine if the refusal contravened provisions of the Human Rights Act. The case, Godwin and DeRoche v. Registrar General, was heard by acting Chief Justice Charles-Etta Simmons of the Supreme Court on 1–3 February 2017.

Judge Simmons issued her ruling in favour of same-sex marriage on 5 May 2017. She wrote that "on the facts, the applicants (Winston Godwin and his Canadian fiancé Greg DeRoche) were discriminated against on the basis of their sexual orientation when the Registrar refused to process their notice of intended marriage.... The applicants are entitled to an Order of Mandamus compelling the Registrar to act in accordance with the requirements of the Marriage Act 1944 and a declaration that same-sex couples are entitled to be married under the Marriage Act 1944." The Rainbow Alliance issued a statement praising the ruling: "The ruling is a victory for all same-gender loving people in Bermuda [and] ensures that same-gender couples can enjoy the same legal protections as heterosexual spouses do". It was also welcomed by operators of several cruise lines with Bermuda-flagged ships, where marriage ceremonies are performed under Bermuda law. The group Preserve Marriage criticised the ruling as "an attack on traditional marriage [and] on Christian and other faith-based traditional values". The organisation, which intervened in the proceedings, and a separate group opposed to same-sex marriage, sought to appeal the decision to the full bench of the Supreme Court, but leave to appeal was not granted. Judge Simmons' ruling included a draft order giving effect to the judgement, but she heard from counsel on the precise terms of the final order before giving it effect. The final order, which included a requirement on the part of the government to pay the petitioners' legal costs, was published on 22 September 2017. On 9 May 2017, Minister of Home Affairs Patricia Gordon-Pamplin said that the government would not appeal the ruling. The Registrar General posted the first wedding banns for a same-sex couple on 17 May, and the first same-sex marriage ceremony was performed in Hamilton on 31 May 2017 for Julia Saltus and Judith Aidoo.

=== Domestic Partnership Act 2018 ===
==== Passage and promulgation ====
After the July 2017 elections, which resulted in the Progressive Labour Party (PLP) returning a comfortable majority of MPs in the House of Assembly, MP Wayne Furbert said he would introduce a bill banning same-sex marriage to the Parliament in September and that he expected the bill to pass. Furbert further stated that the bill would need to be passed by the Senate only if it were amended in the House. If passed in its current form, it would not need approval in the Senate. In addition, the government said that should Furbert's bill pass, it would draft civil union legislation granting same-sex couples rights equal to non-married different-sex couples. Several experts doubted the capacity of Furbert's bill to avoid Senate scrutiny, particularly if it were amended to make arrangements for existing same-sex marriages.

On 2 November 2017, the government introduced a bill to ban same-sex marriage and enact domestic partnerships as a substitute. Two weeks of public consultation were held in various locations. The bill was strongly criticised by human rights groups, the Human Rights Commission and the Rainbow Alliance, which called it "an embarrassment" and "disappointing". The law would provide domestic partners with many of the same rights as married couples, particularly in the areas of pensions, inheritance, health care, tax and immigration. The bill passed the House of Assembly by a 24–10 vote on 8 December 2017. It then passed the Senate by an 8–3 vote on 13 December. The provision of royal assent, usually a formality, was debated in the British Parliament and the subject of a lengthy review by Her Majesty's Government and Governor John Rankin. Foreign Secretary Boris Johnson received calls to withhold approval of the bill. Rankin ultimately provided assent to the bill on 7 February 2018, allowing the law to go into effect on a day to be appointed by the Minister of Home Affairs. A number of international politicians and human rights organisations criticised the change and argued that the move would damage the island's tourist industry. The Bermudian Tourism Authority expressed concerns that Bermuda would experience an economic fallout if the law went into effect.

8 December 2017 vote in the House of Assembly
Party	Voted for	Voted against	Absent (Did not vote)
Progressive Labour Party	22: Walton Brown; David Burch; Derrick Burgess; David Burt; Wayne Caines; Rolfe Commissiong; Zane DeSilva; Thomas Famous; Lovitta Foggo; Tinee Furbert; Wayne Furbert; Dennis Lister III; Renee Ming; Diallo Rabain; Walter Roban; Lawrence Scott; Michael Scott; Scott Simmons; Jamahl Simmons; Kim Swan; Neville Tyrrell; Kim Wilson	–	1: Michael Weeks
One Bermuda Alliance	2: Craig Cannonier; Sylvan Richards	10: Jeanne Atherden; Jeffrey Baron; Michael Dunkley; Grant Gibbons; Patricia Gordon-Pamplin; Susan Jackson; Trevor Moniz; Leah Scott; Cole Simons; Ben Smith	–
Total (Note: The House has 35 voting members. The Speaker of the House of Assembly, Dennis Lister, votes only in case of a tied vote.)	24	10	1
Total	68.6%	28.6%	4.0%

13 December 2017 vote in the Senate
Party	Voted for	Voted against	Absent (Did not vote)
Progressive Labour Party	5: Crystal Caesar; Vance Campbell; Jason Hayward; Anthony Richardson; Kathy Lynn Simmons	–	–
One Bermuda Alliance	–	3: Justin Mathias; Nandi Outerbridge; Andrew Simons	–
Independent	3: Joan Dillas-Wright; James Jardine; Michelle Simmons	–	–
Total	8	3	0
Total	72.7%	27.3%	0.0%

Bermuda's repeal of same-sex marriage received considerable international media coverage. The Guardian and The New York Times reported that "Bermuda had become the first country to repeal same-sex marriage". The repeal was met with calls for a boycott on Twitter and other social media outlets. LGBT groups proposed challenging the new law in court as it "remove[d] an established fundamental human right". Lawyers in the Godwin case said that any further legal action would need to be heard in European courts. On 28 February, the Minister of Home Affairs, Walter Roban, announced that the Domestic Partnership Act 2018 would take effect on 1 June 2018. Same-sex couples who wished to marry before this date had to apply for a marriage licence by 12 May. Marriages performed before this deadline would remain recognised under the new law. The commencement notice was issued on 9 April.

==== Court challenge ====
A legal challenge was filed with the Supreme Court on 16 February 2018. A second lawsuit was also announced on 3 April, and a hearing was held on 21 and 22 May. The court ruled in the case, Ferguson v. Attorney General, on 6 June, revoking the parts of the law that prevented same-sex couples from marrying and held that "maintaining or restoring a definition of marriage that disadvantaged those who believe in same-sex marriage discriminated against them on the grounds of their creed contrary to section 12 of the Bermuda Constitution". The court agreed to an application by Attorney General Kathy Lynn Simmons to stay the ruling by six weeks to allow the government time to consider an appeal. On 5 July, Minister of Home Affairs Roban confirmed that an appeal had been filed with the Court of Appeal. The court heard oral arguments on 7, 8 and 9 November 2018.

On 23 November, the Court of Appeal upheld the ruling and refused to stay the decision. On 13 December, Roban announced that the government had applied to the Court of Appeal for permission to appeal to the Judicial Committee of the Privy Council. A March 2019 estimate showed that the court cases surrounding same-sex marriage had cost taxpayers between $120,000 and $150,000. However, a May 2019 estimate by the association OutBermuda suggested that the court cases were likely to cost taxpayers as much as $3 million. On 29 May 2019, Roban said that permission to appeal had been granted. The government filed the notice of appeal on 12 July, which was heard on 3 and 4 February 2021. The Council handed down its decision on 14 March 2022. It held by a four-to-one margin that the same-sex marriage ban was not unconstitutional, and reversed the Court of Appeal's ruling. Lord Hodge, Lady Arden, Lord Reed and Dame Victoria Sharp held that there was no provision in the Bermuda Constitution that would "nullify a legislative provision enacted by the Legislature on the ground that it had been enacted for a religious purpose", and that Section 8 of the Constitution imposed no legal obligation on the government to recognise same-sex marriage. Lord Sales dissented and wrote that a gay or lesbian person seeking to marry is "hindered in the exercise of their freedom of conscience, in violation of Section 8(1) of the Constitution". British academic Nicola Barker affirmed that the plaintiffs would stand a good chance of overturning the Council's ruling at the European Court of Human Rights (ECHR). They lodged a case, Ferguson and Others v. United Kingdom, with the ECHR in July 2022. The ECHR agreed to hear the application in July 2023.

In July 2022, the Parliament passed a law to recognise same-sex marriages performed prior to the March 2022 Privy Council ruling. During a parliamentary hearing in February 2023, Labour MP Lloyd Russell-Moyle questioned the British Government's decision to block a cannabis decriminalisation bill while having not intervened to block the Domestic Partnership Act in 2018.

=== Attempts at legalisation by the British Parliament ===
In July 2022, Michael Cashman introduced legislation to the House of Lords to legalise same-sex marriage in the remaining six British Overseas Territories that banned it—Anguilla, Bermuda, the British Virgin Islands, the Cayman Islands, Montserrat and the Turks and Caicos Islands. The bill would "empower the Governor of each Territory to make changes to the law in the Territory to recognize the lawfulness of same-sex marriage and allow for the solemnization of marriage of same-sex couples." It had its first reading in the House of Lords on 6 July. This was not the first attempt to extend same-sex marriage rights to all British Overseas Territories; in February 2019, a Foreign Affairs Select Committee report recommended extending same-sex marriage to all territories with an Order in Council. At the time, the Leader of the Opposition in the Turks and Caicos Islands, Washington Misick, had accused the British Government of trying to "neutralise the authority" of the Caribbean territories. MP Chris Bryant accused territories of wanting to "have their cake and eat it": "You want to be under the British umbrella, but you do not want to be part of the British way of life."

== Marriage statistics ==
Between May 2017 and June 2018, twenty same-sex couples were married in Bermuda. Of these, fourteen couples married on the island and six on board Bermudian-registered ships. By May 2019, there had been two more same-sex marriages since the Court of Appeal's judgment in November 2018.

By May 2019, three couples had entered into domestic partnerships.

== Religious performance ==
While the Church of England has allowed its clergy to bless same-sex marriages since 17 December 2023, it is unclear if a similar policy exists in the Anglican Church of Bermuda, an extra-provincial church in the Anglican Communion. In February 2023, a senior Anglican figure said that "[t]he Church [in Bermuda was] struggling with this" issue. Bishop Nick Dill stated in response to the Church of England's decision that "[we] are just going to have to wait and see what the fallout is from all this." The Catholic Church, the second largest Christian denomination in Bermuda, opposes same-sex marriage and does not allow its priests to officiate at such marriages. In December 2023, the Holy See published Fiducia supplicans, a declaration allowing Catholic priests to bless couples who are not considered to be married according to church teaching, including the blessing of same-sex couples. Donald Chambers, the General Secretary of the Antilles Episcopal Conference, said in response that: "The spontaneous blessings are simply gestures that provide an effective means of increasing trust in God on the part of the person who asks. Hence the title, Fiducia supplicans literally means asking for trust."

== Public opinion ==
An opinion poll conducted in July 2010 showed that 27% of respondents supported same-sex marriage, while 51% were opposed. An October 2015 poll conducted by Global Research and commissioned by The Royal Gazette found that 48% of Bermudians supported same-sex marriage and 44% opposed it.

An August 2020 survey conducted by Global Research showed that 53% of Bermudians supported same-sex marriage. Support was highest among 18–34-year-olds at 64%. 95% of respondents felt that the legalisation of same-sex marriage had not negatively affected them, and 75% opposed the government spending more money on the issue in court.

== See also ==
- LGBTQ rights in Bermuda
- 2016 Bermudian same-sex union and marriage referendum
- Domestic Partnership Act 2018
- Recognition of same-sex unions in the British Overseas Territories
- Same-sex marriage in the United Kingdom
