= 2016 Bermudian same-sex union and marriage referendum =

- 23 June 2016

Are you in favour of same-sex marriage in Bermuda?
For	31.46%
Against	68.54%

Are you in favour of same-sex civil unions in Bermuda?
For	36.97%
Against	63.03%

A non-binding referendum on same-sex marriage was held in Bermuda on 23 June 2016. Voters were asked two questions; whether they were in favour of same-sex marriages and whether they are in favour of same-sex civil unions. While majority of voters voted against both proposals, the results were invalid as the turnout of 47% was below the 50% requirement.

== Background ==
Historically, same-sex relationships were not legally recognised as valid in Bermuda. In 2015, the Supreme Court of Bermuda ruled that non-Bermudian same-sex partners must have the same right to live and work on Bermuda as married couples. In 2016, the One Bermuda Alliance-led government of Bermuda declared that they would call a referendum on recognising same-sex unions in Bermuda as a result of the court case, but formally supported the existing legal definition of marriage as between one man and one woman.

== Opinion polls ==
A Global Research poll, conducted between 6 and 13 June 2016 for The Royal Gazette, found that 49% of registered voters opposed same-sex marriage, 41% were in favour and 10% did not know. A separate question on the same survey found that 52% supported civil unions for same-sex couples, 39% were against and 9% did not know.

== Results ==
In the referendum, the voters by a majority rejected same-sex marriage or civil unions in Bermuda. However, due to the turnout failing to reach the 50% threshold for the referendum to be accepted as legally quorate, the results were invalidated and viewed as a public opinion poll only.

Question	For		Against		Invalid/ blank	Total votes	Registered voters	Turnout	Outcome
Question	Votes	%	Votes	%	Invalid/ blank	Total votes	Registered voters	Turnout	Outcome
Are you in favour of same sex marriage in Bermuda?	6,514	31.46	14,192	68.54	98	20,804	44,367	46.89	Invalid
Are you in favour of same sex civil unions in Bermuda?	7,626	36.97	13,003	63.03	175	20,804	44,367	46.89	Invalid
Source: Government of Bermuda

== Aftermath ==
Despite the results and the government's position, in 2017 another Supreme Court case ruled that same-sex couples had the right to marry under the Human Rights Act 1981, thus legalising same-sex marriage in Bermuda. The Parliament of Bermuda responded by passing the Domestic Partnership Act 2018, which recriminalised same-sex marriage but created domestic partnership civil unions for same-sex couples. The Governor of Bermuda considered withholding Royal Assent but after consulting with the British government, signed it into law on the constitutional convention that the British government would not interfere with decisions taken by the local legislature.

== See also ==
- Same-sex marriage in Bermuda
- LGBT rights in Bermuda
