= 1981 Bermuda general strike =

1981 general strike in Bermuda

The 1981 Bermuda general strike was a general strike in Bermuda in May 1981. It was the first general strike in Bermudan history.

== Background ==
The second half of the 20th century brought a number of significant developments to Bermudan society and politics. The Theatre Boycott in the 1950s brought an end to racial segregation on the island, and the 1968 Bermudian general election was the first in Bermudan history organised under universal suffrage. The time period also brought its share of turmoil to Bermudan society, notably the 1965 BELCO strike, over the right to union representation, and the 1977 Bermudan riots, following the execution of two Black Beret Cadre militants convicted for the murder of Richard Sharples. As the 1980s began, the Bermudan economy was undergoing a significant economic boom, particularly in the tourism industry. The boom also saw significant inflation and increases in the cost of living, which particularly impacted the Black community in Bermuda.

== History ==
=== Prelude ===
In early 1981, public sector workers in Bermuda, represented by the Bermuda Industrial Union, and the government of Bermuda under Premier David Gibbons found themselves deadlocked in negotiations over a new collective bargaining agreement.

=== Strike ===
On 6 April, 1150 public sector workers in Bermuda walked off the job and began strike action, demanding above-inflation pay rises.

As the strike stretched on into late April, workers in other sectors began to take actions in solidarity with the public sector workers, including some taxi drivers who picketed the L.F. Wade International Airport. A 30 April meeting of the Bermuda Union of Teachers, however, failed to secure enough to enough vote to launch a sympathy strike. On 18 April, the Bermuda Workers' Socialists set up a solidarity committee, led by the Canon Thomas Nisbett.

As May began, 3000 hotel and restaurant workers voted to launch a sympathy strike. As a result of the strike, most hotels in Bermuda announced that they would be temporarily closing and cruise ships were diverted to Nassau, with the president of the Bermuda Chamber of Commerce estimating that the territory's economy was losing one million dollars a day due to the strike."

On 1 May, a march was staged through Hamilton to mark International Workers' Day. Despite the march not receiving authorisation, Campbell Simons of the Bermuda Police Service marched ahead of it to ensure that it could proceed peacefully. Later that day, Gibbons told the House of Assembly of Bermuda that government could not "negotiate under duress and in the kind of atomsphere [sic] which has prevailed during the past two days." The Bermuda Hotel Association also announced that it would fire many of the striking workers.

On 4 May, Bermuda Industrial Union president Ottiwell Simmons called for a general strike. That day, some workers in other sectors, this time including teachers and utility workers, walked off the job in response to Simmons' call.

On 5 May, workers from all sectors would walk off the job, launching the general strike. Bermuda Electric Light Company workers would join the general strike, in defiance of laws designating them as essential workers requiring a 21-day notice before taking strike action.

=== Resolution ===
In response to the general strike, the government offered the striking public sector workers a new deal with significant concessions.

== Aftermath ==
Following the strike, David Gibbons announced that he would resign as premier, ending his term in January 1982. Gibbons' successor, John Swan, would place a greater emphasis on social development and would last as premier until 1995.

== Reactions ==
=== Contemporary ===
Gibbons described the strike as "illegal, irresponsible and reprehensible." Bermuda Hotel Association vice-president Lyndon Clay called the strike "an utter disaster."

=== Historical assessments ===
In 2021, The Royal Gazette stated that the strike caused "a shift in Bermuda society," saying that it was "a milestone for our less than perfect society, as since which we have been able to remain on a path of non-violently resolving significant community matters."

Glenn Fubler has described the strike as the first time that "members of a union in Bermuda voted to take action in solidarity with members of another" and said that it "may have been the first time in global history that an on-duty police sergeant arguably led an unlawful procession through the streets of a country’s major city."

Progressive Labour Party MP Rolfe Commissiong stated in 2023 that the strike played a significant role in modernising Bermuda "from a society tightly controlled by a small, entitled and privileged White oligarchy."

== Legacy ==
Marches have taken place annually in May to commemorate the anniversary of the general strike.

In May 2024, three trees were planted in honour of three participants in the general strike: one in Victoria Park in honour of Reverend Larry Lowe, one outside the Devonshire Parish police headquarters in honour of Campbell Simons, and one outside Christ Church, Devonshire, in honour of Thomas Nisbett.

== In popular culture ==
Former Bermuda Public Services Association president Leleath Bailey and newspaper columnist Alvin Williams would write a book titled Labour on the March: The Story of Labour Day, detailing the strike and its role in pushing the Bermudan to officially recognise Labour Day. In 2021, a documentary was released on the strike titled Victory: The Story of the Labour Movement & The Historic 1981 Strike.

== See also ==
- Timeline of strikes in 1981
