= LGBTQ rights in Bermuda =

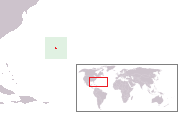
- Bermuda
- Legal status: Legal since 1994 age of consent equalised in 2019, but the age of consent for both heterosexual and homosexual anal sex is still higher than that for other types of sexual intercourse
- Military: Yes
- Discrimination protections: Sexual orientation protections (see below)

Family rights
- Recognition of relationships: Domestic partnerships since June 2018; Same-sex marriage was legal from May 2017 to June 2018 and again from November 2018 until March 2022
- Adoption: Full adoption rights since 2015

Lesbian, gay, bisexual, and transgender (LGBT) people in Bermuda, a British Overseas Territory, face legal challenges not experienced by non-LGBT residents. Homosexuality is legal in Bermuda, but the territory has long held a reputation for being homophobic and intolerant. Since 2013, the Human Rights Act has prohibited discrimination on the basis of sexual orientation.

Bermuda has been in the international spotlight in recent times over the legalisation of same-sex marriage. Such marriages were first legalised by the Supreme Court in May 2017. However, the Government subsequently passed a law banning same-sex marriage and replacing it with domestic partnerships. This law was then struck down in June 2018 by the Supreme Court and again in November 2018 by the Court of Appeal. On 14 March 2022, however, the Judicial Committee of the Privy Council ruled against the Court of Appeal, banning same-sex marriage once again.

== Law regarding homosexual activity ==
Prior to 1994, anal sex and oral sex (for both homosexuals and heterosexuals) were illegal and punishable by up to ten years' imprisonment. Lesbian activity has never been illegal in Bermuda. Following the passing of the Stubbs Bill in 1994, consensual sexual conduct in private was legalised in Bermuda, but with a higher age of consent for gay male sexual conduct at 18, than the age of consent of 16 for heterosexual and lesbian sexual conduct. This age of consent discrepancy was in clear violation of the European Convention on Human Rights. On 1 November 2019, a law took effect, amending the Criminal Code establishing a universal age of consent for consensual anal intercourse at 18 years. As of 2022, age of consent is still not equal, 18 for consensual anal intercourse but 16 for other sexual activity.

A provision in the Criminal Code regarding gross indecency between men was repealed in 2019.

== Recognition of same-sex relationships ==
Same-sex marriage is not legally available in Bermuda since 2022.

In November 2015, the Supreme Court of Bermuda ruled to allow binational same-sex partners equal rights in employment and benefits as all other spouses in Bermuda. In response, politicians decided to hold a non-binding referendum on same-sex marriage, which was held in on 23 June 2016. Voters were asked two questions; whether they were in favour of same-sex marriages and whether they are in favour of same-sex civil unions. Both proposals were rejected by 60–70% of voters, though the referendum was invalid as less than 50% of eligible voters turned out.

In early 2017, the Supreme Court deliberated on a case brought by a male same-sex couple (Winston Godwin and Greg DeRoche), who had their application for a marriage license denied in July 2016. In May 2017, Justice Charles-Etta Simmons made the historic ruling that the couple had been discriminated against and that the Marriage Act 1944 was inconsistent with the provisions of section 2 (2) (a) (ii) as read with section 5 of the Bermuda Human Rights Act, as they constituted deliberate different treatment on the basis of sexual orientation. The ruling had the effect of making same-sex marriage legal in Bermuda.

Following general elections in mid-2017, the new PLP Government passed a law replacing same-sex marriage with domestic partnerships in December 2017. The British Crown did not challenge the change, and the Governor of Bermuda gave royal assent to the law on 7 February 2018. The law went into effect on 1 June 2018, and Bermuda became the first territory in the world to effectively reverse marriage rights for same-sex couples by legislation. A number of international politicians and gay rights organisations criticised the change and argued that the move would damage the island's tourist industry.

By April 2018, two challenges against the law were filed with the Supreme Court. The court heard the matter in May 2018 and issued a ruling on 6 June 2018. The court revoked the parts of the law that prevented same-sex couples from marrying, though also agreed to stay the ruling to allow the Government to appeal to the Court of Appeal. The Court of Appeal upheld the Supreme Court's ruling on 23 November 2018, thereby allowing same-sex marriages to resume once more in Bermuda. On 14 March 2022 the Judicial Committee of the Privy Council ruled for the Attorney General, who was appealing the Court of Appeal’s ruling, banning same-sex marriage once again. In July 2022, laws were passed within Bermuda to retrospectively backdate same-sex marriage legality formally prior to March 2022.

== Adoption and parenting ==
In February 2015, Judge Hellman J of the Supreme Court of Bermuda handed down a ruling, finding that direct discrimination had been found on the grounds of marital status and indirect discrimination had been found on the grounds of sexual orientation, when a same-sex couple had been denied the ability to apply for an adoption in Bermuda. As a result, the Adoption of Children Act applies equally to married and non-married couples (and consequently, same-sex couples). Same-sex couples are thus allowed to adopt.

== Discrimination protections ==
In 2013, the Parliament of Bermuda approved legislation that prohibits discrimination on the basis of sexual orientation.

Prior to this legislation, Bermuda's Human Rights Commission had repeatedly recommended that the Government of Bermuda change discrimination laws to include sexual orientation. In late 2004, it promised to amend the Human Rights Act 1981 to cover sexual orientation, but by late 2005 the matter appeared to have been quietly dropped, until the following year. In 2006, an amendment to the Act was proposed in the House of Assembly, but the Parliament refused to even discuss the issue. In December 2006, an activist group called "Two Words and a Comma" was formed to pressure the Government of Bermuda into amending the act. Following his sudden resignation from Cabinet in 2009, former Culture Minister Dale Butler raised the issue of the amendment, saying that he had intended to table an amended bill in autumn 2009, but that it was now the responsibility of new Culture Minister Neletha Butterfield to do so. Butterfield responded that she was still being apprised of the workings of the Ministry and so could not comment on future plans. In November of that year, following a mention in the annual speech from the throne that the Human Rights Act was to be amended, a rumour circulated that this would include protection for gays. Premier Ewart Brown's press secretary appeared to confirm the rumour, but it was refuted by both the Human Rights Commission and Minister Butterfield, who commented that a sexual orientation clause was still under investigation. It wasn't until 2013 that the Human Rights Act was amended to include sexual orientation.

Bermudians had tried to appeal to the British Parliament regarding LGBT discrimination, prompting the Foreign Affairs Committee to recommend that the British Government should take steps to extend human rights in the British Overseas Territories (BOT), for which the United Kingdom is ultimately responsible.

Bermuda's human rights in general do not have a favourable reputation. In mid-2008, Bermuda was the only BOT to refuse to join a four-year human rights initiative organised by the Commonwealth Foundation.

== Gender identity and expression ==
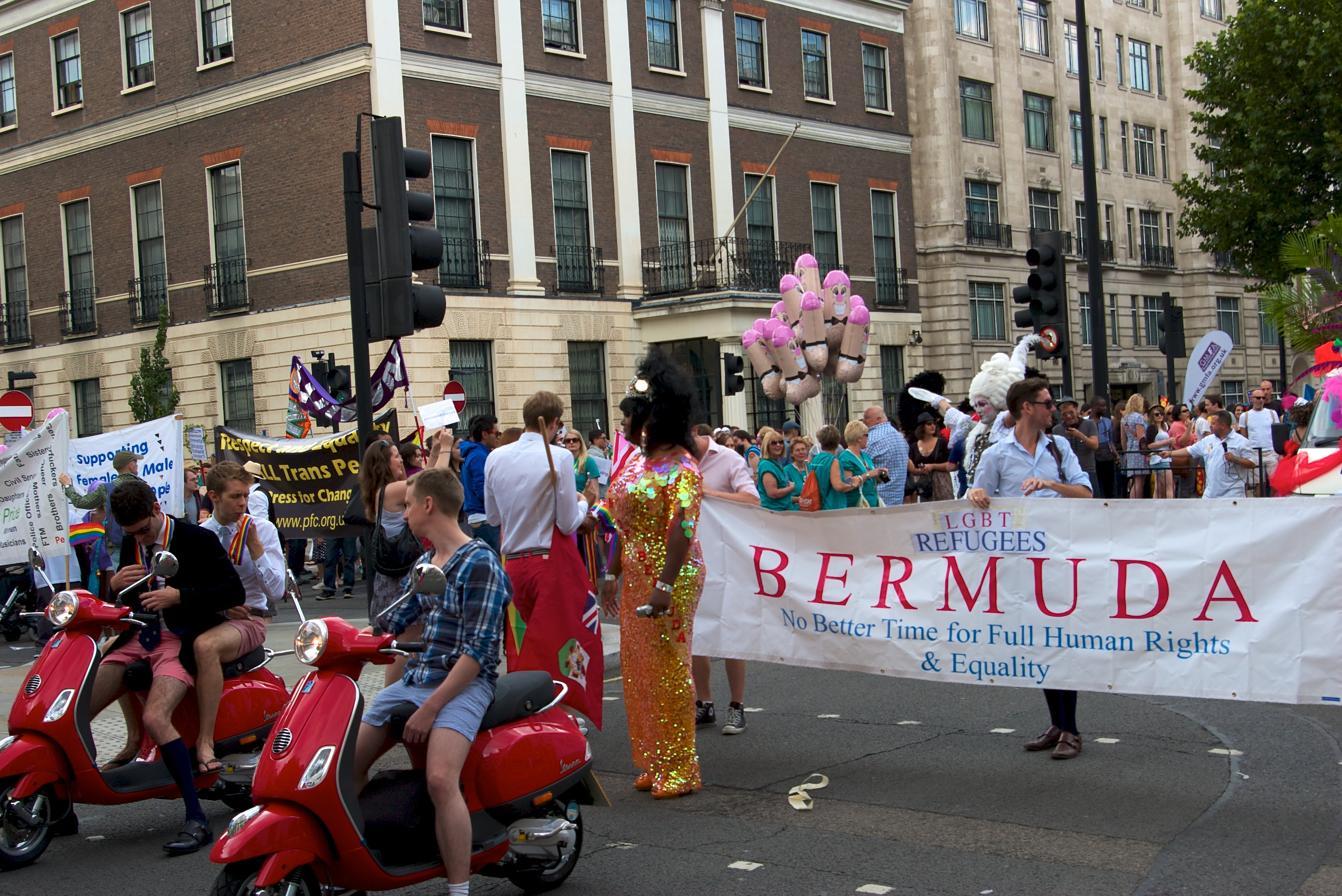
Participants at the 2011 Pride in London marching against hatred and homophobia in Bermuda.

There is no legal recognition of transgender people, and thus, by omission, no protection from discrimination.

The ability of persons to express their gender identity is often difficult; for example, in 2006, the Government attempted to ban Mark Anderson, also known as the drag queen "Queen of Bermuda" Sybil, from participating in a parade, stating that he contradicted local mores and sensitivities. In mid-2009, it was announced that gay Bermudians would be participating in Pride in London, with an estimated 30 LGBT London residents from Bermuda marching, and that it hoped to follow in Anderson's footsteps and participate in a future Bermuda Day pride parade. Gay Bermudians doubted, however, that there would be large-scale participation due to fears of repercussions against their families.

== Military service ==
The Bermuda Regiment does not discriminate on grounds of sexual orientation, as it is formed by random lottery-style conscription. Officially, members of the Regiment are prohibited from discriminating against or harassing LGBT soldiers. Such activities, however, have been reported as being tolerated by officers, to the extent that one conscript described the Regiment as "the most homophobic environment that exists".

== Blood donation ==
Gay and bisexual men may donate blood with the Bermuda Hospitals Board if they haven't had sex with another man in the past 12 months. Likewise, women who have sexual relations with men who have sex with men are deferred for a period of 12 months.

== Living conditions ==
Bermuda is a socially conservative society, though the younger generation is considered to be increasingly culturally liberal. Open displays of affection between same-sex partners may offend.

Several gay Bermudians, who have since moved to the United Kingdom, London in particular, have reported a climate of intense homophobia in Bermuda, where LGBT people are routinely bullied and discriminated against.

As of 2018, there are a number of gay-friendly venues in Bermuda, including restaurants, hotels and bars. Among the gay-friendly venues, there are Anglican congregations in the Anglican Church of Bermuda which explicitly welcome and support LGBTQ members.

The first gay pride parade in Bermuda was held in the capital Hamilton on 31 August 2019. An estimated 6,000 people attended.

=== Tourism ===
Tourism is a significant aspect of Bermuda's economy. In 2007, LGBT R Family Vacations, with the support of Premier and Minister of Tourism and Transportation Ewart Brown, considered making Bermuda one of its destinations. A close ally of Brown, Andre Curtis, who ran a controversial "Faith-Based Tourism" initiative for the Premier, opposed the visit, organising some eighty churches into an interfaith group called "United by Faith" to protest the planned trip, alongside the country's African Methodist Episcopal churches. R Family decided to change the itinerary to replace Bermuda with two stops in Florida and a private island. One of the organisers stated:

"If we didn't have kids on board and there were protesters, we would go, but we did not want to expose kids to that hatred while they were on vacation."

Ironically, Bermuda has actually been the host of gay tourism for many years. The LGBT travel company Pied Piper, for example, has been organising trips – albeit on a smaller and much quieter scale – to the country since 1990, without incident.

Carnival Cruise Line, which has many ships registered in Bermuda, has expressed support for same-sex marriage and LGBT rights.

== DVD gay porn court case ==
In November 2020, it was reported and discovered that the government of Bermuda spent approximately £150,000 to legally appeal an unconstitutional court case of an individual man who was charged and threatened with jail under the archaic "obscene behaviour law" for importing DVDs of gay porn into Bermuda.

== Marriage polls in Bermuda ==
In September 2020, a Bermuda poll was conducted with 53% of individuals supporting same-sex marriage. This is the first time a poll showed a majority in support of same-sex marriage within Bermuda.

== Summary table ==
Same-sex sexual activity legal	Yes (Since 1994)
Equal age of consent	Yes / No (Equal since 2019, but the age of consent for both heterosexual and homosexual anal sex is still higher than that for other types sexual intercourse)
Anti-discrimination laws in employment only	Yes (Since 2013)
Anti-discrimination laws in the provision of goods and services	Yes (Since 2013)
Anti-discrimination laws in all other areas (incl. indirect discrimination, hate speech)	Yes (Since 2013)
Same-sex marriages	No (Since 2022) Has been legal in the past
Recognition of same-sex couples	Yes (Since 2016)
Stepchild adoption by same-sex couples	Yes (Since 2015)
Joint adoption by same-sex couples	Yes (Since 2015)
LGBT people allowed to openly serve within the military	Yes (Responsibility of the United Kingdom)
Right to change legal gender	No
Access to IVF for lesbians	No
Commercial surrogacy for gay male couples	No (Banned for heterosexual couples as well)
MSMs allowed to donate blood	/ (12 month deferral period required)

== See also ==
- LGBT rights in the United Kingdom
- LGBT rights in the Commonwealth of Nations
- LGBT rights in the Americas
