= Timeline of strikes in 1981 =

Strikes in 1981

In 1981, a number of labour strikes, labour disputes, and other industrial actions occurred.

== Background ==
A labor strike is a work stoppage caused by the mass refusal of employees to work. It is usually a response to employee grievances, such as low pay or poor working conditions. Strikes can also occur to demonstrate solidarity with workers in other workplaces or pressure governments to change policies.

== Timeline ==
=== Continuing strikes from 1980 ===
- 1980-81 Bangalore public sector strike
- 1980-81 West Bank teachers strike, by Israeli-employed Palestinian teachers in the West Bank demanding pay raises to match their salaries with the salaries of teachers in Israel.

=== January ===
- 1981 general strike in Bielsko-Biała

=== February ===
- 1981 Athens taxi strike
- 1981 Irish hunger strike
- 1981 Qantas strike, by Qantas staff in Australia.
- 1981 Venice transport strike

=== March ===
- Bydgoszcz events
- 1981 warning strike in Poland

=== April ===
- 1981 Bermuda general strike, the first general strike in Bermudan history.
- 1981 Danish printers' strike, 11-week strike in the printing industry in Denmark.
- 1981 Dannon Yogurt strike, 5-week strike by Danone workers in New York, represented by the Milk Drivers and Dairy Employees.
- 1981 Wagner College strike, 20-day strike by faculty at Wagner College.
- 1981 Writers Guild of America strike

=== May ===
- 1981 Nigerian general strike

=== June ===
- 1981 Birzeit University strike, strike by students at Birzeit University in the West Bank in protest against Israeli forces' harassment of students.
- 1981 Canada Post strike, 42-day strike by Canada Post workers represented by the Canadian Union of Postal Workers demanding the right to paid maternity leave.
- 1981 Major League Baseball strike
- 1981 Schlitz strike

=== July ===
- 1981 British Columbian lumber strike, by forestry workers in British Columbia, Canada, represented by the International Woodworkers of America; the first province-wide forestry strike since 1959.
- Cape Breton coal strike of 1981
- 1981 Ford Brazil strike
- 1981 Georgia Power strike, by Georgia Power staff in the United States, represented by the International Brotherhood of Electrical Workers.
- 1981 Minnesota public sector strike, 22-day strike.
- 1981 Polish hunger demonstrations

=== August ===
- 1981 Cape Cod Hospital strike, 17-day strike by nurses at Cape Cod Hospital.
- 1981 Professional Air Traffic Controllers Organization strike
- 1981 Sierra Leone general strike, the first in the history of Sierra Leone.
- 1981 Stelco strike, 125-day strike by Stelco steelworkers in Canada.

=== September ===
- 1981 Hawaii tugboat strike
- 1981 Philadelphia teachers' strike
- 1981 Swingline strike, month-long strike by Swingline workers in the United States.

=== November ===
- 1981 El Al strike, 12-day strike by El Al staff in Israel.
- 1981 Bolivian tin miners' strike
- 1981 British Leyland strike, month-long strike by British Leyland workers in the United Kingdom over proposals to reduce the amount of break times workers received.
- 1981 Massachusetts bus strike, 42-day strike by transit workers in Massachusetts, represented by the Amalgamated Transit Union.

=== December ===
- December 1981 Gaza general strike, general strike in the Gaza Strip.
- 1981 Golan Heights Druze strike, by members of the Druze community in the Golan Heights protesting the Israeli annexation of the Golan Heights.
- Milwaukee police strike
- 1981 strike at the Piast Coal Mine in Bieruń
