= BPSU =

BPSU may refer to:

- Bataan Peninsula State University, Philippines
- Bermuda Public Services Association, a trade union in Bermuda
- Bristol Polytechnic Students' Union, the former name of the University of the West of England Students' Union
- British Paediatric Surveillance Unit, a national team for the study of uncommon childhood infections and disorders
