= Bermuda Form =

Form of insurance policy

The term Bermuda Form refers to various types of insurance policy.

In the 1980s, American companies found it increasingly difficult to buy large amounts of casualty (liability) insurance, partly because American courts interpreted policies in ways which gave coverage to policyholders which was wider than the insurers had anticipated, causing insurers large losses particularly in relation to asbestos and pollution. To meet the needs of corporate insurance buyers, new insurance companies were set up in Bermuda, notably ACE, XL, and Starr Excess Casualty. Each of these insurers produced its own standard-form policy (which has been revised and re-issued over the years), and collectively these policies are loosely described as the "Bermuda Form".

Bermuda Form standard policy wordings stipulate that they are governed by New York law, although sometimes the parties have agreed to change this to Bermudian or another governing law. To reduce the perceived risks of the American jury system and United States procedural rules, the policies usually provide for disputes to be resolved by arbitration, often in London, and for punitive damages to be excluded. Bermuda Form arbitrations are confidential and therefore rarely reported; the reported case of C v. D ([2007] EWHC 1541 (Comm)) is an example of a Bermuda Form arbitration which was the subject of an appeal to the High Court. Arbitrators appointed under UK arbitration legislation also operate neutrally, whereas US party-appointed arbitrators are expected to lean towards supporting the party who appointed them.

Bermuda Form policies share certain similarities: for example, they exclude liability for asbestos and pollution. They also provide for multiple losses to be batched together into a single claim called an "Integrated Occurrence": batching claims in this way can allow a policyholder to make claims which would otherwise have been barred by the policy deductible (for example, in mass product liability litigation, each claim individually might be too small to exceed the deductible, but all claims taken together might exceed it).
