= Barbara Ball =

- Born: Barbara Bertha Ball; 13 June 1924; Bermuda
- Died: 13 March 2011 (aged 86); St. George's, Bermuda
- Occupations: physician, trade union administrator, civil rights activist
- Years active: 1949–2005
- Known for: championing self-determination and voting rights for black Bermudians

Barbara Bertha Ball MRCS, LRCP, OBE (13 June 1924 – 13 March 2011) was a Bermudian physician, politician and social activist. She was the first woman physician to practice in Bermuda and took both black and white patients, an unusual event in the 1950s. During the time that segregation was rigidly enforced, Ball actively ignored the social norms, actively fighting for the civil rights of black Bermudians. She served as a member of the Parliament of Bermuda and represented black workers through her work with the Bermuda Industrial Union. In 1963, at a United Nations meeting regarding colonialism, Ball brought the situation of black workers on the island to the table. In 2000, she was honoured as an officer of the Order of the British Empire.

== Early life ==
Barbara Bertha Ball was born on 13 June 1924 in Bermuda to Jessie Alice (née Clap) and Carlton Ball. Her mother was a native Bermudian and her father was an English carpenter who came to Bermuda to work at Prospect Garrison. Ball's younger brother Walter was physically disabled and would later become well-known newspaper vendor. After completing her secondary education at the all-white Bermuda High School for Girls, she won a government scholarship to attend medical school in Liverpool. In 1942, she entered Liverpool University, and also studied judo, graduating with her medical degree seven years later.

== Career ==
Ball began her career in England and spent the next five years working as a physician at hospitals in Liverpool and Westmorland. In 1954, Ball returned to Bermuda and joined an existing medical practice, Bermuda Medical Associates (BMA). Though the third woman to train as a physician, she was the first Bermudian-born practitioner. She quickly became known for taking and providing equal care to patients without regard to their race. Her actions caused the other physicians at BMA to ask her to withdraw from the practice. She withdrew, rented a small office space on Cedar Avenue from the St. Theresa's Catholic Cathedral, and continued treating patients from all races. She simultaneously began teaching judo classes in the evenings, but after receiving warnings from the police that she could not teach black Bermudians, she formed her own judo club, which was one of the first integrated sports centres in the country.

In 1959, during the Bermuda Theatre Boycott, Ball publicly supported black Bermudians in their quest for equality. She was well aware of the difficulties many of her black patients had in paying for medical treatment and felt that lack of income should not impact one's health. The following year, speaking at a public meeting, she supported the abolition of the property requirement as a qualifier to being able to vote, instead expressing support for universal suffrage for all adults upon attaining the age of 21. Her radical stance was that wealth should be equally distributed among society. Her support of blacks and workers, caused a rift with her church causing her conversion from Anglicanism to Catholicism that same year.

Ball joined the Bermuda Industrial Union (BIU) in 1961. The BIU had been formed in 1946 to represent the working class, which was predominantly black and disenfranchised. By the following year, she became the BIU's General Secretary. In 1963, Ball and Walton Brown attended a United Nations subcommittee meeting regarding colonialism. She stressed that the racism in the country created unequal opportunity for black Bermudians and pressed for self-determination. British representatives dismissed the idea.

Ball's work with the union caused her to be unpopular with those whites who thought she was a "traitor to her race". In 1964, she lost admitting privileges at King Edward VII Memorial Hospital and was dismissed as choirmistress and organist of her church, St. Michael's in Paget. The following year Ball was threatened with a prison sentence for her participation in the Bermuda Electrical Light Company (BELCO) strike. She gained respect from the underground civil rights workers during the BELCO strike because she used her skill with judo to avoid police detention. Charged with inciting a riot, Ball and six other accused strike leaders, were tried in the Supreme Court. Four of the accused men were found guilty of obstruction and incitement, while Ball and the other defendant were acquitted.

Under Ball's leadership, the BIU expanded its base of labourers, seeking construction workers and hotel workers as members. After her trial, union membership grew and the BIU became the largest union in the country. In 1968 and again in 1972, Ball was a successful candidate for the Progressive Labour Party (PLP), as a member of the House of Assembly of Bermuda. The 1968 race was the first general election in Bermuda after the passage of the universal suffrage law. She resigned as General Secretary of BIU in 1974, but continued to remain active negotiations for pay increases and benefits, like pensions and insurance as well as paid maternity and sick leave until 2005. In 2000, Ball was honoured as an officer in the Order of the British Empire.

== Death and legacy ==
Ball died on 13 March 2011 at the Sylvia Richardson Care Facility in St. George's, Bermuda. She was buried on St Paul's Anglican Cemetery in Paget on 19 March 2011, after her funeral service which was widely attended by noted politicians and trade unionists. While she is remembered as a pioneering doctor in Bermuda, her legacy was in her fight for the civil rights of Bermuda's black residents. The government established the Dr. Barbara Ball Public Health Scholarship in her honour. Ottiwell Simmons, with whom Ball had worked at BIU, published a biography of Ball's life, Our Lady of Labour in 2010.
