= Patrycjusz Kosmowski =

Patrycjusz Kosmowski (born 25 July 1947 in Bielsko-Biała) is a Polish social activist, leader of Solidarity in the region of Bielsko-Biała. A graduate of Lodz University of Technology (1974), he worked in the 1960s, 1970s and 1980s in various companies in his hometown, including public transportation and Fabryka Samochodów Małolitrażowych.

In August 1980, he emerged as one of leaders of local industrial action, and organizer of first structures of Solidarity in Bielsko-Biała. On 11 September 1980, he became the leader of the local Interfactory Founding Committee (MKZ). In late January 1981, he organized the 1981 general strike in Bielsko-Biała, and later that year, was a delegate of the Podbeskidzie Region to the first national congress of Solidarity (September 1981, Gdańsk). He also was a member of the National Coordinating Commission.

Following the introduction of Martial law in Poland (December 13, 1981), he remained in hiding. Arrested on 19 January 1982, he was in March of that year sentenced to six years. Kosmowski was first sent to a prison in Raciborz, and then in several locations, such as Strzelce Opolskie and Klodzko. Released on 25 July 1984, he left Poland for Sweden, where he still lives.
