= Lascelles Principles =

British constitutional convention

The Lascelles Principles are a constitutional convention in the United Kingdom beginning in 1950, under which the sovereign can refuse a request from the prime minister to dissolve Parliament if three conditions are met:

1. if the existing Parliament is still "vital, viable, and capable of doing its job",
2. if a general election would be "detrimental to the national economy", and
3. if the sovereign could "rely on finding another prime minister who could govern for a reasonable period with a working majority in the House of Commons".

The convention was in abeyance from 2011 to 2022, when the sovereign's prerogative power to dissolve Parliament was removed by the Fixed-term Parliaments Act 2011. Following passage of the Dissolution and Calling of Parliament Act 2022, which repealed the Fixed-term Parliaments Act, these principles are thought to have been revived.

The Lascelles principles are not the only convention governing how the sovereign makes decisions relating to changes of government. For example, the Cabinet Manual notes the historic precedent of the sovereign dismissing a government under reserve powers. However, this was last done by William IV, who dismissed Lord Melbourne's government despite majority support in the Commons and is thought to have damaged the sovereign's reputation.

The general principles of government formation also affect this decision. The Cabinet Manual stresses that the monarch should not be exposed to political decisions and "it remains a matter for the Prime Minister, as the Sovereign's principal adviser, to judge the appropriate time at which to resign". The Manual notes that recent Prime Ministers have chosen not to resign until an established situation was set which the sovereign could be advised to accept.

== The letter ==
During public discussion of George VI's potential response to the outcome of the 1950 general election, which returned a very slim Labour Party majority in the House of Commons, the Lascelles Principles were formally stated in a letter to the Editor of The Times, written by the King's Private Secretary Sir Alan Lascelles, and published on 2 May 1950, under the pseudonym "Senex":

To the Editor of The Times

Sir, It is surely indisputable (and common sense) that a Prime Minister may ask—not demand—that his Sovereign will grant him a dissolution of Parliament; and that the Sovereign, if he so chooses, may refuse to grant this request. The problem of such a choice is entirely personal to the Sovereign, though he is, of course, free to seek informal advice from anybody whom he thinks fit to consult.

In so far as this matter can be publicly discussed, it can be properly assumed that no wise Sovereign—that is, one who has at heart the true interest of the country, the constitution, and the Monarchy—would deny a dissolution to his Prime Minister unless he were satisfied that: (1) the existing Parliament was still vital, viable, and capable of doing its job; (2) a General Election would be detrimental to the national economy; (3) he could rely on finding another Prime Minister who could carry on his Government, for a reasonable period, with a working majority in the House of Commons. When Sir Patrick Duncan refused a dissolution to his Prime Minister in South Africa in 1939, all these conditions were satisfied: when Lord Byng did the same in Canada in 1926, they appeared to be, but in the event the third proved illusory.

I am, &c.,

SENEX.

April 29.

== Subsequent discussion ==
Historian Peter Hennessy stated in 1994 that the second of the three conditions had since been "dropped from the canon", being no longer included in internal Cabinet Office guidance.
