= Cannabis in Bermuda =

Cannabis in Bermuda is legal for medical use and decriminalized for recreational use.

The Supreme Court of Bermuda ruled in favour of allowing the medical use of cannabis in November 2016. However, an importation limit of just 1 gram (1/28 oz) per year resulted in patients turning to the black market to purchase medicinal cannabis products. The limit was later increased although, individual patients must apply to import their own cannabis products.

In 2017, Bermuda introduced the Decriminalization of Cannabis Amendment Act, which decriminalized simple possession of up to 7 grams (¼ oz) of cannabis.

In December 2019, the Bermudian government released a proposed draft Medicinal Cannabis Bill, along with licensing regulations. It would create the Medicinal Cannabis Authority, which would be tasked with regulating cultivation, import, export, manufacturing, research and development, and transport. It would also see a register of the strains that would be permitted, the various tiers of cultivation and the conditions licensees must adhere to, as well as the issuing of licenses and identification cards for all Bermudans taking part in the scheme. Following public consultation of the bill that indicated that the territory should more broadly legalise and regulate cannabis, for medicinal and personal use, the Bermudian government revised the bill and opened submissions from the public again. On 11 December 2020 the cannabis licensing act was officially tabled in the house of assembly, Kathy Lynn Simmons, the Attorney-General and the Minister of Legal Affairs stated, “The presented Bill is the culmination of a comprehensive social justice reform project to liberalise our cannabis laws in line with global contemporary thought, scientific evidence and overwhelming public support.” Adding: “The Government is aware that this Bill placed before the House proposes to permit lawful uses of cannabis for personal adult-use, and by doing so it prescribes uses beyond ’medical and scientific use’ as sanctioned by the United Nations oversight bodies. “However, the Government is pursuing all diplomatic and legal options to deliver on its promise to our people. “We can be assured that the Bermuda Government is following in the wake of Canada and other jurisdictions who, by enacting domestic laws permitting personal adult-use of cannabis, are in ’respectful non-compliance’ with the international narcotics conventions without sanction." The bill passed the house but was failed to pass the Senate by a margin of six votes against and five votes in support on 3 March 2021. In March 2022 the Bill was reintroduced and passed the house, the bill was not required to pass the senate and thus was referred to the governor general for royal assent, who in may of 2022 pursuant to Section 35[2] of the Bermudian constitution, reserved assent on the bill and notified the secretary of state for foreign, commonwealth and development affairs, of the decision citing that the bill was inconsistent with what she understood to be the United Kingdom's and subsequently Bermuda's obligations under UN conventions. Premier David Burt, who previously declared that if the bill failed to receive royal assent it would destroy Bermuda's relationship with London, stated that the government awaited the next move by British Foreign Secretary Liz Truss.

== Medical use ==
In November 2016, the Supreme Court of Bermuda ruled in favor of allowing the medical use of cannabis. As of July 2018, two doctors have been licensed to prescribe the drug. Despite these reforms, legal medicinal cannabis was until recently impossible to obtain due to self-imposed restrictions with the United Nations. On March 30, 2020, these UN restrictions were relaxed to 2,000 grams (4 lb) per year with the potential for patients to import their own. These changes are likely to be expanded on with the upcoming Cannabis (Licensing and Control) Act 2020. Otherwise, the Bermuda Government has not legislatively made steps towards ensuring legal medicinal importation, and with providing prescribed patient(s) with their medication.

== Decriminalization ==
In December 2017, Bermuda passed legislation decriminalizing personal possession of 7 grams (¼ oz) or less of cannabis.

== Withholding assent to recreational cannabis bill ==
The Bermuda Legislature in May 2022 passed a bill to legalize cannabis recreationally - but however was stopped, because the Governor of Bermuda in a rare move blocked assent to the bill. The Bermuda Senate did reject the bill, but because it was rejected twice it still went to the Governor. Medicinal cannabis is still legal in Bermuda. In September 2022, Liz Truss the recently sworn in prime minister of the UK officially and formally blocked the Bermuda cannabis legislation.
