= Reserve power =

Discretional power of a head of state

In a parliamentary or semi-presidential system of government, a reserve power, also known as discretionary power, is a power that may be exercised by the head of state (or their representative) without the approval of another branch or part of the government. Unlike in a presidential system of government, the head of state (or their representative) is generally constrained by the cabinet or the legislature in a parliamentary system, and most reserve powers are usable only in certain limited circumstances.

== Constitutional monarchies ==
In monarchies with either an uncodified or partly unwritten constitution (such as the United Kingdom or Canada) or a wholly written constitution that consists of a text augmented by additional conventions, traditions, letters patent, etc., the monarch generally possesses reserve powers.

Typically these powers are: to grant pardon; to dismiss a prime minister; to refuse to dissolve parliament; and to refuse or delay royal assent to legislation (to withhold royal assent amounts to a veto of a bill, while to reserve royal assent, in effect, amounts to neither granting nor refusing assent, but to delay making a decision for an undetermined period). There are usually strict constitutional conventions concerning when these powers may be used, and these conventions are enforced by public pressure. Using these powers in contravention of tradition would generally provoke a constitutional crisis.

Most constitutional monarchies employ a system that includes the principle of responsible government. In such an order, the reserve powers are thought to be the means by which the monarch and his or her viceregal representatives can legitimately exist as "constitutional guardians" or "umpires", tasked with guaranteeing that Cabinet and parliament adhere to the fundamental constitutional principles of the rule of law and responsible government itself. Some constitutional scholars, such as George Winterton, have stated that reserve powers are a good thing in that they allow for a head of state to handle an unforeseen crisis and that the use of convention to limit the use of reserve powers allows for more gradual and subtle constitutional evolution than is possible through formal amendment of a written constitution. Others, such as Herbert Evatt, believe or believed that reserve powers are vestigial and potentially open to abuse. Evatt felt that the reserve powers could be codified and still serve their intended function in a responsible government system, as they do in Ireland, Japan, and Sweden.

=== Belgium ===
The Belgian constitution has an explicit provision stating no act of the monarch is valid without the signature of a member or members of the government, which thereby becomes solely responsible, hence excluding any reserve power for the crown. In legal terminology, a competence vested in 'the King' thus very often means the government, as opposed to formal laws which require a (sometimes qualified) parliamentary majority.

Constitutional precedence has even established the unwritten but binding rule that the monarch must give assent to any parliamentary decision, regardless of any other considerations (which can only be advanced in private audience with government members, not imposed), as soon as the government presents it for royal signature and thus assumes full political responsibility.

In 1990, when a law liberalising Belgium's abortion laws was approved by parliament, King Baudouin refused to give his royal assent, only the second time in Belgium's history a monarch had done so. Instead, he requested cabinet to declare him unable to reign for a day, which it did and thus assumed the king's constitutional powers. All members of the government then signed the bill, passing it into law. The bicameral Belgian Federal Parliament approved a proposition that Baudouin was capable of reigning again the next day.

=== Commonwealth realms ===
Within the Dominions, until the 1920s, most reserve powers were exercised by a governor-general on the advice of either the local or the British government, though the latter took precedence. After the Balfour Declaration was produced by the 1926 Imperial Conference, formally establishing the autonomy and equal status of Commonwealth governments, governors-general ceased to be advised in any way by the British government. For example, the first Governor-General of the Irish Free State, Tim Healy, was instructed by the British Dominions Office in 1922 to withhold the royal assent on any bill passed by the two houses of the Oireachtas (the Irish parliament) that attempted to change or abolish the Oath of Allegiance. However, no such bill was introduced during Healy's period in office. By the time the oath was abolished by the Irish Parliament in 1933, the Irish governor-general was formally advised exclusively by the Irish government.

==== Australia ====
While the reserve power to dismiss a government has not been used in the United Kingdom since 1834, this power has been exercised more recently in Australia, on two occasions:

1. On 13 May 1932, when the Governor of New South Wales Sir Philip Game dismissed the Government of New South Wales.
2. On 11 November 1975, when the Governor-General of Australia Sir John Kerr dismissed the Commonwealth Government.

In both cases an election was held very soon afterwards and, again in both cases, the dismissed government was massively defeated by popular vote.

In Queensland in 1987, during a tense period of leadership succession, the Governor of Queensland, Sir Walter Campbell, exercised reserve power in declining to follow the advice of the Premier, Sir Joh Bjelke-Petersen. Campbell initially refused to redistribute ministerial portfolios on the sole advice of the premier, who lacked the confidence of his cabinet. Subsequently, during a period when Queensland had a "Premier who is not leader" and the governing party had a "Leader who is not Premier", there was speculation on the potential exercise of viceregal reserve power by Campbell, in dismissing the premier in the absence of a parliamentary motion of no confidence. Ultimately, Campbell was praised for his handling of the undesirable situation.

These are among several exercises of the reserve powers in Australia in the 20th century at both state and federal levels.

==== Canada ====
The reserve powers in Canada fall within the royal prerogative and belong specifically to the monarch, as the Constitution Act, 1867, vests all executive power in the country's sovereign. King George VI in 1947 issued Letters Patent permitting the governor general "to exercise all powers and authorities lawfully belonging to Us [the monarch] in respect of Canada."

The reserve power of dismissal has never been used in Canada, although other reserve powers have been employed to force the prime minister to resign on two occasions: The first took place in 1896, when the Prime Minister, Sir Charles Tupper, refused to step down after his party did not win a majority in the House of Commons during that year's election, leading Governor General the Earl of Aberdeen to no longer recognize Tupper as prime minister and disapprove of several appointments Tupper had recommended. On the second occasion in 1925, which came to be known as the King–Byng affair, Prime Minister William Lyon Mackenzie King, facing a non-confidence motion in the House of Commons, advised the Governor General, the Viscount Byng of Vimy, to dissolve the new parliament, but Byng refused.

At the provincial level, on 29 June 2017 Lieutenant Governor of British Columbia Judith Guichon used her reserve powers to deny the request of Premier Christy Clark to dissolve the legislature and call a new election only 51 days after the recent provincial election. Clark had advised Guichon to dissolve the legislature as, in her view, the appointment of a Speaker would have resulted in frequent tie votes and an untenable position. Guichon refused this advice and instead asked John Horgan to form a government, becoming the new premier.

No modern governor general has disallowed a bill, though provincial lieutenant governors have.

Peter Hogg, a constitutional scholar, has opined that "a system of responsible government cannot work without a formal head of state who is possessed of certain reserve powers." Further, Eugene Forsey stated "the reserve power is indeed, under our Constitution, an absolutely essential safeguard of democracy. It takes the place of the legal and judicial safeguards provided in the United States by written Constitutions, enforceable in the courts."

==== New Zealand ====
New Zealand's early governors, the predecessors of today's governors-general, exercised considerable power, with exclusive authority over some matters such as foreign and Māori affairs. They also had a real choice in selecting premiers – parliaments of the period being composed of independent members who formed loose and shifting factions – and were not always obliged to act on the advice of their ministers. As New Zealand's political system matured, the Colonial Office increasingly instructed the governors to follow the advice of local ministers, and the powers of the office have continually shrunk. Important remnants of these early powers remain. The governor-general has a number of reserve powers, which may be used on behalf of King Charles III. Sir Kenneth Keith describes the use of these powers as based on the principle that "The Queen reigns, but the government rules, so long as it has the support of the House of Representatives".

The most visible reserve powers are the power to appoint a prime minister and the related power to accept a prime minister's resignation. This power is exercised every time a general election results in a change of government, most recently in 2023. It may also be exercised if a prime minister loses the confidence of Parliament and resigns instead of advising a dissolution of Parliament; the last such occasion was in 1911. Finally, it may happen if a Prime Minister is maneuvered out of their position by their own party, retires or resigns for personal reasons, or dies in office. Though the power of appointment is listed among the reserve powers, in fact the governor-general abides by strict conventions, and has always appointed the leader of the dominant faction in the House of Representatives. The governor-general retains the theoretical power to appoint as prime minister a member of the House of Representatives who clearly does not have the support of a majority of MPs, but no governor-general has sought to use this power since New Zealand gained responsible government, though some cabinets in the 19th century proved extremely short-lived. In earlier times, if a prime minister died, became incapacitated, or resigned unexpectedly, a governor-general might be able to choose a temporary prime minister from among several senior ministers, while the governing party decided on a new leader who would then be duly appointed prime minister. Today, however, the practice of appointing – on prime-ministerial advice – a permanent deputy prime minister, who becomes acting prime minister when needed, has largely removed even this discretion from the governor-general.

The governor-general has a number of other legal powers. They may dismiss an incumbent prime minister and Cabinet, an individual minister, or any other official who holds office "during the King's pleasure" or "during the Governor-General's pleasure". Conventionally, the governor-general follows the advice of the prime minister or another appropriate minister in matters of appointment and dismissal. Likewise, by convention, the Government as a whole remains in office as long as it keeps the confidence of the House.

The governor-general can also dissolve Parliament and call elections without prime-ministerial advice. Dissolving Parliament and calling for elections is part of the governor-general's normal duties; every parliamentary dissolution and subsequent general election in New Zealand's history has been called by the governor or governor-general. However, all elections since responsible government was introduced, including snap elections, have been requested by the incumbent premier or prime minister, and are accordingly not examples of use of the reserve powers. A prime minister who has lost the confidence of the House will conventionally either advise a dissolution of Parliament and new elections, or tender their resignation. If a defeated prime minister refuses to do either of these two things, the governor-general could use the reserve powers to either dismiss the prime minister (see above), or dissolve Parliament without the prime minister's advice. Likewise, if the prime minister tenders their resignation, the governor-general could theoretically refuse to accept it, and dissolve Parliament against the Prime Minister's advice.

A governor-general can also refuse a prime minister's request to dissolve Parliament and hold elections. If a prime minister has been defeated by a vote of no confidence, a refusal by the governor-general to dissolve Parliament would, in effect, force the prime minister to resign and make way for a successor. See the Lascelles Principles for factors which might guide the governor-general in making a decision on whether or not to grant a dissolution in those circumstances. A governor-general could also legally refuse a request for a snap election from a prime minister in whom the House has confidence, but such a refusal would be extremely unlikely.

The power to withhold royal assent to Bills is controversial. Many constitutional commentators believe that the governor-general (or the sovereign) no longer has the power to refuse royal assent to any bill properly passed by the House of Representatives – former law professor and Prime Minister Sir Geoffrey Palmer and Professor Matthew Palmer argue any refusal of royal assent would lead to a constitutional crisis. Others, such as Professor Philip Joseph, believe the Governor-General does retain the power to refuse royal assent to Bills in exceptional circumstances - such as the abolition of democracy. A similar controversial power is the ability to refuse to make Orders and regulations advised by the Government or by individual Ministers.

There have been a handful of occasions when reserve powers were used, or at least considered.

In the 1890s, Premier John Ballance advised the Governor to make several new appointments to the (since abolished) Legislative Council. Two successive Governors, the Earl of Onslow and the Earl of Glasgow, refused to make the appointments, until the Colonial Office intervened in Ballance's favour. This incident markedly reduced the discretionary powers of the Governor. Though these remained the same in law for the time being, later Governors and governments considered that there would be far fewer scenarios in which their use would be appropriate.

Almost a century later, in 1984, there was a brief constitutional crisis. The outgoing Prime Minister, Sir Rob Muldoon, had just lost an election, but refused to advise the Governor-General, Sir David Beattie, to make urgent regulations desired not only by the incoming Prime Minister, David Lange, but also by many in Muldoon's own party and cabinet. At the time, the option of Beattie dismissing Muldoon and replacing him, without waiting for Muldoon's resignation, was reportedly discussed. Muldoon eventually relented under pressure from his own cabinet, making the use of Beattie's reserve powers unnecessary.

==== Saint Kitts and Nevis ====
A constitutional crisis occurred in Saint Kitts and Nevis in 1981, when the governor, Sir Probyn Inniss, used his reserve powers to refuse assent to a bill passed by the government of Sir Kennedy Simmonds, the country's premier. Inniss believed that the bill was unconstitutional, and would soon be struck down by the West Indies Associated States Supreme Court. The situation was resolved when Queen Elizabeth II, at the request of Simmonds, terminated Inniss's commission as governor.

==== Tuvalu ====
The Constitution of Tuvalu provides, in article 52, that the Governor-General exercises his powers "only in accordance with the advice of (a) the Cabinet; or (b) the Prime Minister [...] except where he is required to act (c) in accordance with the advice of any other person or authority [...] or (e) in his own deliberate judgment (in which case he shall exercise an independent discretion)".

In 2013, Governor-General Sir Iakoba Italeli was requested by the Opposition to act without (and indeed against) the Prime Minister's advice. On 28 June, Prime Minister Willy Telavi's government had lost a crucial by-election, which gave the Opposition a majority of one in Parliament. The Opposition immediately called for the government to reconvene Parliament, so that a motion of no confidence could be introduced, and a new government formed. Prime Minister Telavi responded that, under the Constitution, he was only required to convene Parliament once a year (for a vote on the budget), and was thus under no obligation to summon it until December. The Opposition turned to the Governor-General. On 3 July, Italeli exercised his reserve powers in ordering Parliament to convene, against the Prime Minister's wishes, on 30 July.

In the end, the Governor-General dismissed the Prime Minister from office.

==== United Kingdom ====
In the United Kingdom, the monarch has numerous theoretical personal prerogatives, but beyond the appointment of a prime minister, there are in practice few circumstances in modern British government where these prerogatives could be justifiably exercised; they have rarely been exercised in the last century. In October 2003 the Government made public the following prerogatives but it said at the time that a comprehensive catalogue of prerogative powers could not be supplied:

- To refuse to dissolve Parliament when requested by the prime minister. This was last reputedly considered in 1910, but George V later changed his mind. Harold Wilson, leading a minority government in 1974, was told that Elizabeth II might refuse to dissolve Parliament if she could identify an alternative prime minister able to command a cross-party majority. See Lascelles Principles.
- To appoint a prime minister of their own choosing. This was last done in Britain in 1963 when Elizabeth II appointed Alec Douglas-Home as prime minister, on the advice of outgoing Harold Macmillan.
- To dismiss a prime minister and their government on the monarch's own authority. This was last done in Britain in 1834 by King William IV.
- To summon and prorogue Parliament.
- To command the armed forces.
- To dismiss and appoint ministers.
- To commission officers in the armed forces.
- To appoint King's Counsel.
- To issue and withdraw passports.
- To create corporations via royal charter.
- To appoint bishops and archbishops of the Church of England.
- To grant honours.
- To grant the prerogative of mercy.
- To delay a bill's assent through the use of his or her reserve powers in near-revolutionary situations, thereby vetoing the bill.
- To refuse royal assent of a parliamentary bill on the advice of ministers. This was last done by Queen Anne when she withheld royal assent from Scottish Militia Bill 1708.
- To declare war and peace.
- To deploy the armed forces overseas.
- To ratify and make treaties.
- To refuse the "King's Consent", where direct monarchical assent is required for a bill affecting, directly or by implication, the prerogative, hereditary revenues—including ultimus haeres, treasure trove, and bona vacantia—or the personal property or interests of the Crown to be heard in Parliament. In 1999, Queen Elizabeth II, acting on the advice of the government, refused to signify her consent to the Military Action Against Iraq (Parliamentary Approval) Bill, which sought to transfer from the monarch to Parliament the power to authorise military strikes against Iraq.

These powers could be exercised in an emergency such as a constitutional crisis (such as surrounded the People's Budget of 1909) or in wartime. They would also be very relevant in the event of a hung parliament.

For example, in the hung parliament in 1974, Prime Minister Edward Heath attempted to remain in power but was unable to form a working majority. The Queen then asked Harold Wilson, leader of the Labour Party, which had the largest number of seats in the Commons but not an overall majority, to attempt to form a government. Subsequently, Wilson asked that if the government were defeated on the floor of the House of Commons, the Queen would grant a dissolution, which she agreed to.

=== Japan ===
Unlike most other constitutional monarchs, the Emperor of Japan has no reserve powers. Following Japan's defeat in World War II, the Emperor's role is defined in Chapter I of the 1947 Constitution of Japan, as decided by foreign powers that had defeated the country. It states that sovereignty rests with the Japanese citizenry, not the Emperor who is merely the symbol of the State and the unity of the people.

=== Malaysia ===
The Yang di-Pertuan Agong (the elective, supreme federal ruler, commonly glossed as “King”) has no reserve powers. Article 40 of the Malaysian constitution specifies only three powers of the Yang di-Pertuan Agong: to reject a request to dissolve Parliament; to convene a meeting of the Conference of Rulers; and to appoint the Prime Minister, whom he has no power to dismiss.

=== Spain ===
The Spanish Constitution of 1978 does not specifically grant emergency powers to the government, though does state in Article 56 that the monarch "arbitrates and moderates the regular functioning of the institutions", and invests the monarch with the responsibility of overseeing that the forms of the constitution are observed. It is through this constitutional language that wider "reserve powers" are granted to the monarch. It is through this clause and his position as commander-in-chief of the Spanish Armed Forces that King Juan Carlos I undermined the attempted 23-F military coup in 1981.

Title II, Articles 56
The King is Head of State, the symbol of its unity and permanence. He arbitrates and moderates the regular functioning of the institutions, assumes the highest representation of the Spanish State in international relations, especially with the nations of its historical community, and exercises the functions expressly conferred on him by the Constitution and the laws.

The Spanish Constitution of 1978, Title II The Crown, Article 62, delineates the powers of the monarch, while Title IV Government and Administration, Article 99, defines the monarch's role in government. Title VI Judicial Power, Article 117, Articles 122 through 124, outlines the monarch's role in the country's independent judiciary. However, by constitutional convention established by Juan Carlos I, the monarch exercises prerogatives after having solicited government advice, while remaining politically non-partisan and independent. Receiving government advice does not necessarily bind the monarch into executing said advice, except where prescribed by the Constitution.

It is incumbent upon the King:

- a. To Sanction and promulgate the laws
- b. To summon and dissolve the Cortes Generales and to call for elections under the terms provided for in the Constitution.
- c. To Call for a referendum in the cases provided for in the Constitution.
- e. To appoint and dismiss members of the Government on the President of the Government's proposal.
- f. To issue the decrees approved in the Council of Ministers, to confer civil and military honours and distinctions in conformity with the law.
- g. To be informed of the affairs of State and, for this purpose, to preside over the meetings of the Council of Ministers whenever, he sees fit, at the President of the Government's request.
- h. To exercise supreme command of the Armed Forces
- i. To exercise the right of clemency in accordance with the law, which may not authorize general pardons.
- j. To exercise the High Patronage of the Royal Academies.

Once a General Election has been announced by the monarch, political parties nominate their candidates to stand for the presidency of the government.

Following the General Election of the Cortes Generales (Cortes), and other circumstances provided for in the Constitution, the monarch meets with and interviews the political party leaders represented in the Congress of Deputies, and then consults with the Speaker of the Congress of Deputies (officially, Presidente de Congreso de los Diputados de España, who, in this instance, represents the whole Cortes Generales) before nominating his candidate for the presidency, according to Section 99 of Title IV. Often minor parties form part of a larger major party, and through that membership it can be said that the monarch fulfills the constitutional mandate of consulting with party representatives with Congressional representation.

Title IV Government and Administration Section 99(1) & (2)

- (1) After each renewal of the Congress and the other cases provided for under the Constitution, the King shall, after consultation with the representatives appointed by the political groups with parliamentary representation, and through the Speaker of the Congress, nominate for the Presidency of the Government.
- (2) The candidate nominated in accordance with the provisions of the foregoing subsection shall submit to the Congress the political program of the Government he or she intends to form and shall seek the confidence of the House.

The Spanish Constitution of 1978 explicitly says the monarch is not subject to any responsibility but for his acts to be valid must be endorsed by the Government and will not be valid without such an endorsement. The only exception is that the monarch is free to appoint and remove the members of private and military advisors (Casa Real).

Title IV of the Constitution invests the monarch with sanction (Royal Assent) and promulgation (publication) of laws, while Title III The Cortes Generals, Chapter 2 Drafting of Bills outlines the method by which bills are passed. According to Article 91, within fifteen days that a bill has been passed by the Cortes Generales, the monarch shall give assent and publish the new law. Article 92 invests the monarch with the right to call for a referendum on the advice of the president and the previous authorization of Congress.

No provision within the Constitution invests the monarch with the ability to veto legislation directly, however no provision forbids the denial of royal assent – effectively, a veto. When the media asked King Juan Carlos I if he would endorse the bill legalizing same-sex marriages, he answered "Soy el Rey de España y no el de Bélgica" ("I am the King of Spain, and not that of Belgium") – in reference to King Baudouin of Belgium who in 1990 had refused to grant express assent to a Belgian bill legalising abortion (though allowing it to become law through a legal loophole). The King gave his royal assent to Law 13/2005 on 1 July 2005; the law was gazetted in the Boletín Oficial del Estado on 2 July, and came into effect on 3 July 2005.

=== Sweden ===
Much like the Emperor of Japan, the King of Sweden does not have any constitutional responsibility for the governance of the Realm, with strictly ceremonial and representative functions remaining. Under the 1974 Instrument of Government, the supreme executive authority is the Government (composed of the Prime Minister and other cabinet ministers), which is responsible to the Riksdag. The King, however, is not subordinate to the Government and thus could play an independent role as moral authority, but the prevailing convention, expressed in the preparatory works of the 1974 Instrument of Government, is that the King should stay away from anything which could reasonably be interpreted as partisan politics or criticism of the Government in office.

== Republics ==
Reserve powers can also be written into a republican constitution that separates the offices of head of state and head of government. This was the case in Germany under the Weimar Republic and is still the case in the French Fifth Republic, the Italian republic, and the Republic of Ireland. Reserve powers may include, for instance, the right to issue emergency legislation or regulation bypassing the normal processes. In most states, the head of state's ability to exercise reserve powers is explicitly defined and regulated by the text of the constitution.

=== Bangladesh ===
The President of Bangladesh must consult with the Prime Minister for all decisions except the appointment of the Prime Minister and the Chief Justice. However, the President has the authority to dissolve the government or parliament, grant pardon to criminals, block bills/budgets by the legislature or declare an emergency.

During the regime of the caretaker government, the President's power expanded dramatically; effectively (s)he is no longer a ceremonial head of state.

=== France ===
Article 16 of the Constitution of France allows the President of the Republic to exercise exceptional powers in case of a national emergency. During this time, the President may not use his prerogative to dissolve the National Assembly and call early elections. He must still consult the Prime Minister, the leaders of both houses of Parliament and the Constitutional Council.

The inspiration for this disposition in the Constitution was the institutional chaos and lack of government authority which contributed to the French debacle in the Battle of France in 1940. On a larger scale, this is consistent with a tradition of the Roman Republic (which has always been an inspiration for the successive French Republics), to give six months of dictatorial power to a citizen in case of an imminent danger of invasion.

Article 16 rule has only been exercised once, in 1961, during a crisis related to the Algerian War in which Charles de Gaulle needed those emergency powers to foil a military plot to take over the government. In 1962, the Council of State ruled itself incompetent to judge measures of a legislative nature issued by the President under Article 16.

In his book, Le Coup d'État permanent (The Permanent Coup), François Mitterrand criticized Article 16 for allowing an ambitious politician the opportunity to become a dictator. However, he made no move to put away his reserve powers after he himself became president.

=== Germany ===
The German constitution limits the powers available to the President to prevent a situation in which the executive could effectively rule without legislative approval, which was the case in the Weimar Republic. In particular, the president cannot rule by decree. However, in case of a "legislative emergency" the German President can accept legislation without approval of the "Bundestag" (parliament). Article 81 of the German constitution states the possibility that the President can by this means keep a government capable of action even in case of loss of a constructive majority in the Bundestag.

Furthermore, the German President can dissolve the Bundestag (parliament) if the Chancellor loses a motion of confidence and asks the President to do so. The German President has exercised this right four times since the founding of the Federal Republic in 1949. President Gustav Heinemann dissolved the Bundestag at the request of Chancellor Willy Brandt in 1972, and in 1982 President Karl Carstens did so at the request of Chancellor Helmut Kohl. Both Brandt and Kohl were reelected with larger majorities. On 1 July 2005, President Horst Köhler dissolved the Bundestag at the request of Chancellor Gerhard Schröder. Schröder unexpectedly lost the election that followed. Most recently, on 27 Dec 2024, President Frank-Walter Steinmeier dissolved the Bundestag after the Traffic light coalition collapsed, and chancellor Olaf Scholz lost the motion of confidence according to plans to call for an early election.

The President has the right to refuse his signature to laws passed by the parliament (veto) in certain circumstances. These may be formal errors in the law-making process or violations of the Basic Law inherent to the new law. This reserve power has been used 8 times as of May 2013. (Note: See the German Wikipedia entry de:Bundespräsident (Deutschland).)

The President nominates the first candidate for Chancellor put to vote in the Bundestag. The president can also dissolve the Bundestag if no candidate won the absolute majority of the members of parliament after three votes.

The President has the right to pardon criminals for federal crimes with the countersignature of a member of the cabinet. The refusal of a pardon does not need a countersignature.

=== Ireland ===
The President of Ireland does not possess executive powers: executive powers are held by the Government, which is headed by a Taoiseach (Prime Minister), who is chosen by and accountable to Dáil Éireann (House of Representatives).

The President's powers are principally defined by Article 13 of the Constitution of Ireland. For the most part, these ceremonial duties may be performed only on the authority, and with the binding advice, of the Government.

However, the President has certain reserve powers, also known as "discretionary powers" in Ireland, which can be exercised by the President at his or her discretion – without, or even contrary to, the Government's advice.

The two most politically important discretionary powers are:

1. Refusing to dissolve the Dáil on the advice of a Taoiseach who has lost the confidence of the Dáil.
2. Referring legislation to the Supreme Court.

The first of these means that a Taoiseach who has been defeated by a vote of no-confidence cannot automatically expect to appeal to the people by calling a general election. The question of whether or not the Taoiseach has lost the confidence of the Dáil could be a discretionary matter for the President to decide – in principle, the President could refuse to dissolve the Dáil on the advice of a Taoiseach who has not yet been defeated in a vote of no-confidence, but who appears likely to be defeated were such a vote to be held. This power has not so far been used, but it could be a crucial power in the event of the collapse of a governing coalition.

By the second of these powers, the President may refuse to assent to legislation passed by Parliament when he or she considers it to be unconstitutional. The President refers the matter to the Supreme Court, which makes the final decision. This power has been used several times by various Presidents.

In addition to these powers, the President has various other discretionary powers in the Constitution, which are of lesser political significance (in normal circumstances). The President may decide to call a referendum on legislation "of great national significance". This power, granted by Article 27 of the Constitution, has not so far been used. The President cannot initiate a referendum, but must wait for an application by a majority of the Seanad (Senate) and one-third of the Dáil. Generally, owing to the way in which the Seanad is elected, the Government's coalition controls a majority of the seats, and strong party discipline means that Senators rarely go against their own party, so getting Seanad support for a referendum is difficult. If the Seanad were to be reformed, this power could potentially become much more significant. Similarly, the President has a latent role in resolving disputes between the Dáil and the Seanad. The President may convene a special committee to resolve questions of privilege between the Dáil and the Seanad with regard to Money Bills, and with regard to speeding the passage of urgent bills through the Seanad. Again, owing to the method by which the Seanad is elected, disputes of this nature tend not to emerge in practice.

The exercise of these powers is entirely at the President's discretion, for which the President is neither legally nor politically responsible. However, prior to their exercise, the President is bound, in most cases, to consult the Council of State, an advisory body consisting of a mixture of senior ex-officio and nominated members.

=== Italy ===
The President of the Italian Republic's powers are defined by articles 87 through 90 of the Constitution of Italy. The President of the Republic:

- can send official messages to the chambers of Parliament;
- appoints the President of the Council of Ministers;
- may appoint up to five senators for life;
- appoints a third of the judges of the Constitutional Court;
- can grant pardons and commutations of sentences;
- can call for new elections for both or only one of the chambers, except during the last six months of his term.

The President of the Republic can refuse to sign laws he deems clearly against the Constitution, while less obvious cases are dealt with later on by the Constitutional Court. If the rejected law is passed again by a majority in the Parliament, however, the President must sign it.

Given his monocratic nature, this organ joins in itself prerogatives that in all other collegial organs are attributed collectively. (Note: In the Constitution, as interpreted by the jurisprudence of the Constitutional Court (judgment no. 9 of 1970 ), parliamentary immunity is not a subjective right of the individual member of Parliament, but a prerogative of the Parliament as a whole.)

== See also ==
- Separation of powers of state into separate branches, normally an executive, a legislature, and a judiciary
- Westminster system
- Donald Markwell
- Eugene Forsey
- George Winterton
- H. V. Evatt
