= King–Byng affair =

1926 Canadian constitutional crisis

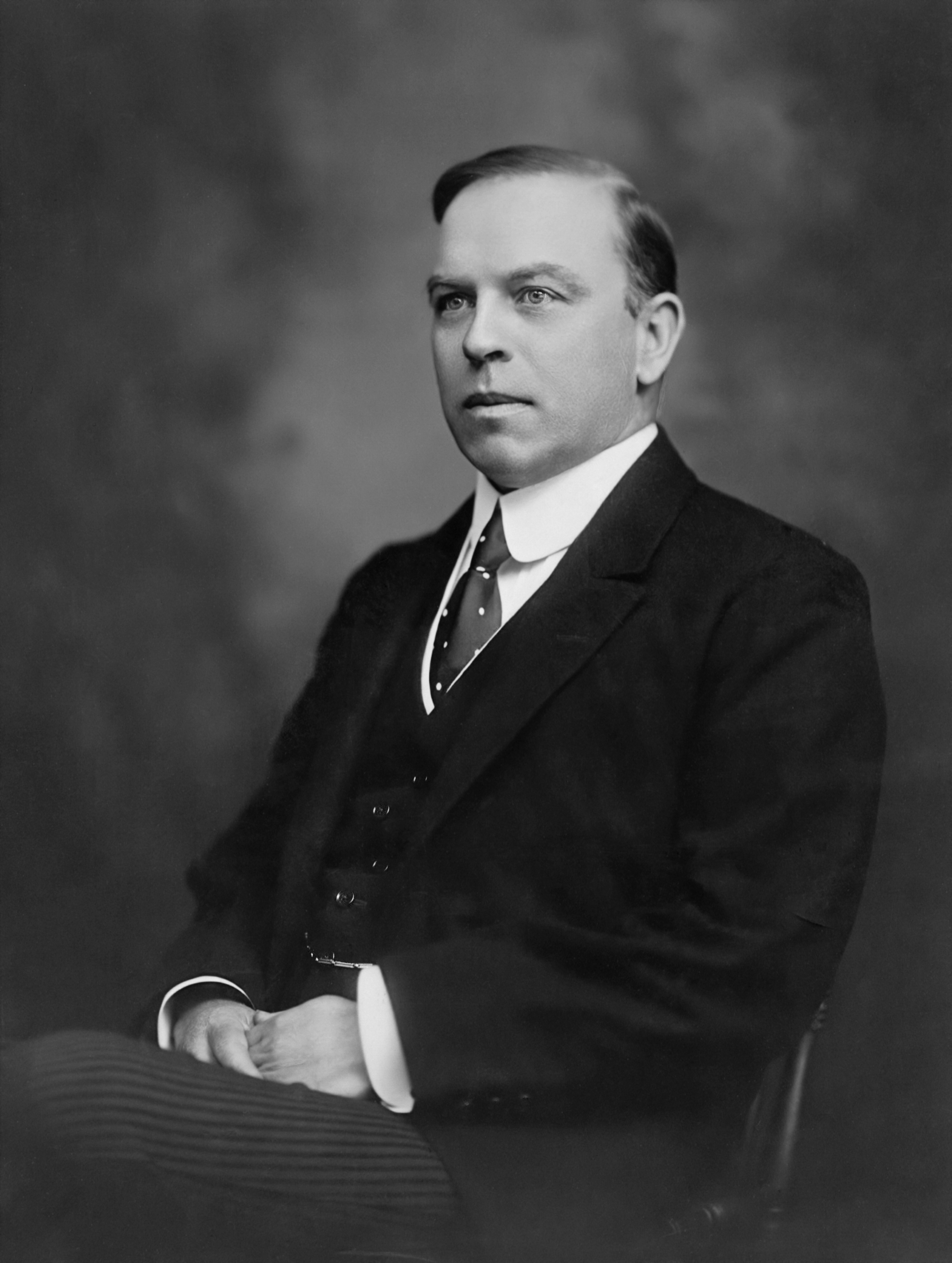
William Lyon Mackenzie King, Prime Minister of Canada

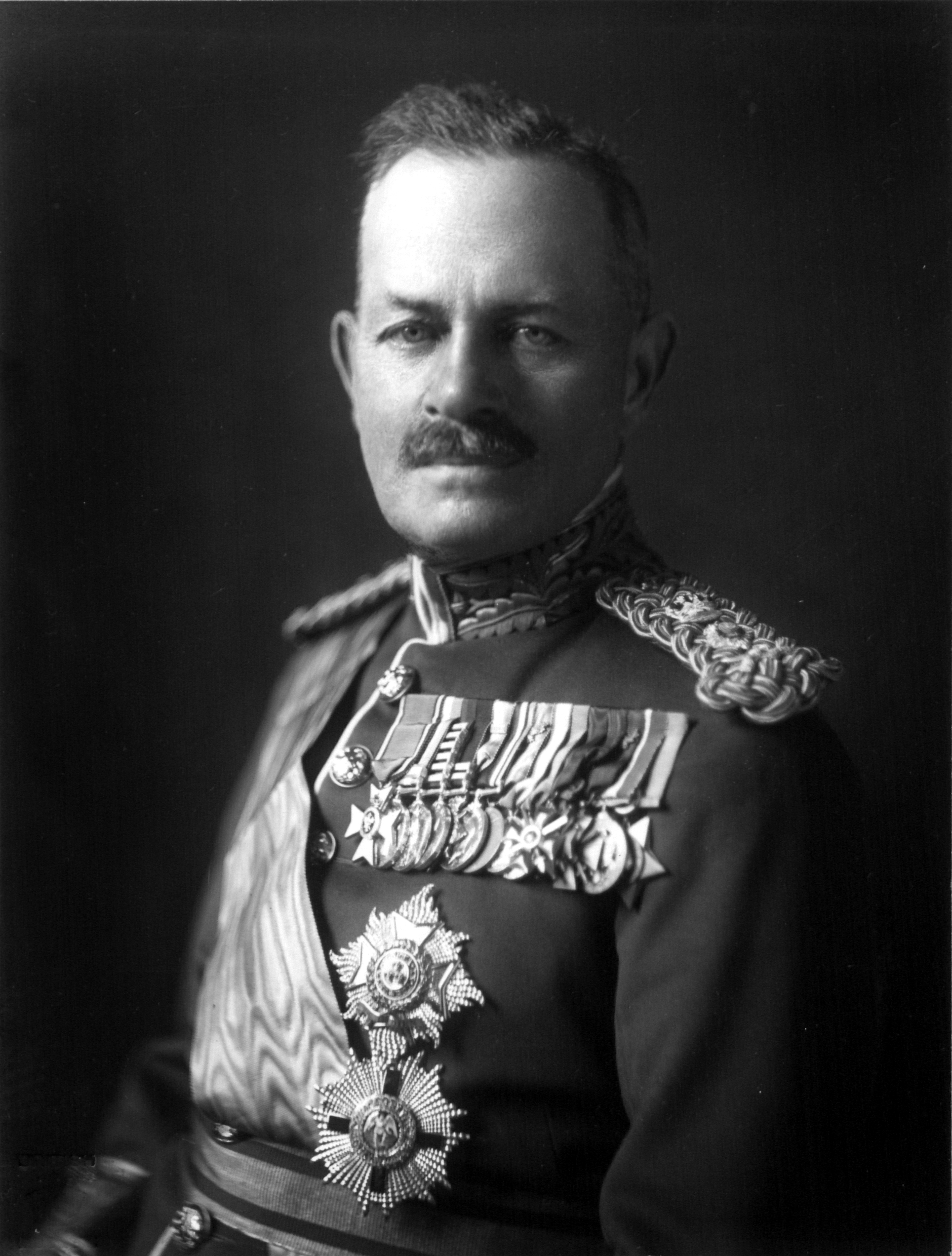
Lord Byng of Vimy, Governor General of Canada

The King–Byng affair, also known as the King–Byng Wing Ding, was a Canadian constitutional crisis that occurred in 1926, when the Governor General of Canada, Lord Byng of Vimy, refused a request by the Prime Minister, William Lyon Mackenzie King, to dissolve parliament and call a general election.

The 1925 Canadian federal election saw King's Liberals winning fewer seats than the Conservatives of Arthur Meighen, who were left eight seats short of a majority. The Progressives lost almost two-thirds of their seats from the previous election, but they still held enough seats to control the balance of power. As the incumbent party is given the first opportunity to form government, King decided to attempt to hold onto power with the help of the Progressives. The Progressives' alliance with the Liberals enabled King to form a minority government.

In June 1926, facing a Commons vote that could force his government to resign following a scandal, King asked Byng to dissolve parliament and call an election. Byng refused King's request, exercising his reserve powers. King duly resigned, and Byng invited the Conservative Party to form a government. The Meighen government lost a motion of no confidence on 2 July 1926, and the governor general then agreed to dissolve parliament. Following the election on 14 September, King again assumed the office as prime minister, once again leading a minority government, but this time as the clear largest party in parliament and only narrowly short of a majority.

The crisis came to redefine the role of governor general throughout the Dominions of the British Empire, becoming a major impetus in negotiations at Imperial Conferences held in the late 1920s that led to the adoption of the Statute of Westminster 1931. According to constitutional convention until then, the governor general represented the sovereign both in his imperial council and in his Canadian council, but the convention evolved afterwards into a tradition of non-interference in Canadian political affairs on the part of the British government. After 1931, the governor general remained an important figure in Canadian governance as a constitutional watchdog, but the role was shorn of its previous imperial duties.

== Background ==
The election results of 1925: Liberal (101), Conservative (116), Progressive (22), other (6)

In September 1925, Prime Minister King advised Governor General Lord Byng to dissolve parliament and drop the writ for a general election, to which Byng agreed. In the subsequent election, held on 29 October, Arthur Meighen's Conservative Party won 116 seats in the House of Commons to 101 for King's Liberals. The Progressive Party, an agrarian centre-left party, won 22 seats.

Meighen declared victory, but King did not resign. The previous parliament, formed after the 1921 election, had seen King frequently cooperate with members of the Progressive Party to maintain a majority. Although the Progressives' numbers had also been substantially reduced (from 58), they continued to hold the balance of power in the chamber, and King was confident this informal arrangement could continue even though the Liberals were no longer the largest party.

On 30 October, King visited Byng after consulting with the rest of Cabinet and informed the Governor General that his government would continue until parliament decided otherwise. Byng, who had suggested to King that he ought to resign with such a tenuous mandate, later stated he told the Prime Minister: "Well, in any event you must not at any time ask for a dissolution unless Mr Meighen is first given a chance to show whether or not he is able to govern", to which Byng believed King acquiesced, but King denied took place.

While Meighen and other Conservatives expressed public outrage at what they viewed as a desperate attempt on the part of King to cling to power, some Conservatives were privately relieved by King's decision; they seriously doubted whether the Tories could convince the Progressives to support a Conservative minority government, were confident that King's attempt to remain in power would eventually fail, and thought the expected debacle would be so damaging to the Liberals' reputation that the Conservatives would then be swept into office with a majority.

=== Customs scandal ===
A few months later, one of King's appointees in the Department of Customs and Excise was revealed to have taken bribes, after which the Conservatives alleged that the corruption extended to the highest levels of government, including the prime minister. King had already replaced the Minister of Customs and Excise, Jacques Bureau, with Georges Henri Boivin, but recommended that Byng appoint Bureau to the Senate. This alienated Progressive members who were already distancing themselves from the government because of its failure to transfer control of Alberta's natural resources from the federal government to the province.

The Progressive Party's support was temporarily retained by the formation of a special committee to investigate the corruption in the customs department. Its report, which was presented to the House of Commons, acknowledged that there was widespread fraud in the department but did not specifically criticize the government. A Conservative Member of Parliament, H. H. Stevens, proposed an amendment to the report which would effectively censure the government and compel it to resign. However, Labour MP J. S. Woodsworth proposed amending Stevens' amendment to remove the censure of the government and set up a Royal Commission to investigate the customs department further. The motion was defeated, despite the full support of the government. A Progressive MP, William Russell Fansher, then proposed that a Royal Commission be combined with the original motion of censure. The Speaker of the House ruled the motion out of order, but, on division, the members over-ruled the speaker and the Cabinet was defeated again. After a motion that the House adjourn, put forward by a Progressive member at King's behest, was subsequently also voted down, King announced that he would accept Fansher's amendment and secured an adjournment.

=== Request for dissolution ===
To avoid the inevitable vote on the Fansher amendment, which would either force his government's resignation or bring his administration into disrepute, King went to Byng on 26 June 1926 seeking a dissolution of parliament. Byng, citing his reserve powers, stated he was inclined to refuse the request, reminding King of their agreement made the previous October and arguing that the Conservatives, as the largest party in parliament, should have a chance to form a government before an election was called. For the next two days, the Prime Minister and the Governor General discussed the matter, with Byng asking King not to request a dissolution which he could not give and King twice requesting that Byng consult the British government prior to making any decision. Byng again refused, saying the matter should be settled in Canada, without resort to London. With Byng remaining steadfast, King formally presented the Governor General with an Order in Council for the dissolution of parliament on June 28, which Byng declined to sign, on the grounds that the House of Commons should first be given the opportunity to decide if it could support a different government.

Having been refused his formal request, King resigned. Byng then invited Conservative leader Arthur Meighen to form a government. Although many Conservatives privately preferred an election, Meighen believed he was bound by honour and convention to accept Byng's invitation and formed a Cabinet.

At that time, convention dictated that the ministers of the Crown drawn from the House of Commons were obliged upon appointment to resign their seats in parliament and run for re-election in by-elections. This posed a problem for Meighen: his and the other ministers' temporary absence from the House would make the government extremely vulnerable in the event of a vote of non-confidence. Meighen circumvented this by advising the appointment to Cabinet of ministers without portfolio, who were not required to run for re-election. Progressives and Liberals saw the use of "acting ministers" as against the spirit of the convention, and moved for no-confidence in Meighen's government, which lost confidence by only one vote at 2 am on 2 July 1926.

Voting results on Question of Privilege of the Honourable James Alexander Robb
Party	Question of Privilege			Total
Party	Yeas	Nays	Not voting	Total
Liberal Party of Canada	77	0	24	101
Conservative Party of Canada	0	91	24	115
Progressive	14	2: Arthur Moren Boutillier; William Russell Fansher	5	21
Labour	2	0	0	2
United Farmers of Alberta	0	1	1	2
Independent (Note: Two independent MPs voted Yea, an effective vote of no-confidence, one Independent Liberal did not vote, one Independent Conservative voted Nay, an effective vote of confidence)	2: Henri Bourassa; Alan Webster Neill	1	1	4
Total	95	94	56	245
Result	Agreed to on Division (Note: The effect of this vote was to signal non-confidence of the House of Commons in the government, causing Prime Minister Arthur Meighen to request dissolution of Parliament from the Governor General)			

Meighen subsequently requested a dissolution of parliament, which was granted by Byng on 2 July, and an election was called for 14 September. King's Liberals won a plurality of seats in the House of Commons, while Meighen lost his seat. The vote was decided by one vote, with the vote of Thomas William Bird, who, advertently or inadvertently, violated a vote pairing agreement to vote for the question of privilege.

== Legacy ==
Upon returning to power, King's government sought at an imperial conference to redefine the role of the governor general as a personal representative of the sovereign in his Canadian council and not of the British government (the king in his British council). The change was agreed to at the Imperial Conference of 1926 and came to be official as a result of the Balfour Declaration of 1926 and Statute of Westminster 1931.

In a letter to King George V, whom he represented in Canada as governor general, Byng expressed surprise that Mackenzie King, a staunch nationalist, had requested that Byng consult the Colonial Office in London over the matter. Byng said: "I have to await the verdict of history to prove my having adopted a wrong course, and this I do with an easy conscience that, right or wrong, I have acted in the interests of Canada and implicated no one else in my decision." The Colonial Secretary, Leo Amery, privately informed Byng that had he appealed to the British government for an answer, "I could only have replied ... that in my view it would not be proper for the Secretary of State to issue instructions to the Governor with regard to the exercise of his constitutional duties."

Byng returned to the United Kingdom, leaving Canada on 30 September 1926 a much respected man in both countries, despite the political crisis. Some authorities have held that Byng was constitutionally obligated to refuse King's request; for example, Eugene Forsey argued that King's advice to Byng was "utterly unprecedented" and said further: "It was tantamount to allowing a prisoner to discharge the jury by which he was being tried ... If the Governor-General had granted the request, he would have become an accomplice in a flagrant act of contempt for Parliament." The relatively brief time that King had served in office prior to seeking a dissolution has also been cited as a reason for denying his request. In the United Kingdom in 1950, the Lascelles Principles expressed the relevant constitutional conventions in the matter, citing the King–Byng controversy as one of the underlying precedents.

Other authorities agreed with King, since, by custom, the Lord Byng of Vimy was obligated to heed the Prime Minister's request to call the election. In 1997, the governor-general of New Zealand, Sir Michael Hardie Boys, expressed the opinion that Byng had been in error in not re-appointing King as prime minister and then granting the dissolution of parliament to King instead of Meighen.

The King–Byng Affair was the most controversial use of a governor general's reserve powers until the Australian constitutional crisis of 1975, in which the Governor-General of Australia, Sir John Kerr, dismissed Prime Minister Gough Whitlam.

The role of ministerial by-elections in weakening Meighen's position contributed to the decision of R. B. Bennett's Tories to abolish them in 1931.

== See also ==
- 1975 Australian constitutional crisis
- Lascelles Principles
- Easter Crisis of 1920
- 2008–09 Canadian parliamentary dispute
