= Advice (constitutional law) =

Formal instructions from one officer of state to another

Advice is a formal instruction given by one constitutional officer of state to another that, in many parliamentary systems, is usually binding. For example, heads of state (such as constitutional monarchs) often only act on the advice of the head of government (such as the prime minister) or other ministers. Common examples of advice include the appointment of ministers, the use of executive powers, the calling of elections and the request to deliver formal statements, such as a speech from the throne.

Depending on the state, the duty to accept advice may or may not be legally enforceable. For example, advice is generally not legally enforceable under most countries that follow the Westminster system. Nevertheless, the convention that ministerial advice is always accepted is so strong that in ordinary circumstances, refusal to do so would almost certainly provoke a constitutional crisis, or, at minimum, the removal of the head of state. By contrast, Japan's head of state (the Emperor) is obliged by the constitution to appoint the prime minister designated by the parliament (Diet).

In certain limited circumstances, usually emergencies or situations threatening to become emergencies, the head of state may act in absence of advice. In Westminster systems, this is known as the reserve powers and their use is heavily constrained by convention. In some circumstances these powers are uncontroversial. For example, the head of state must act without advice when appointing a new prime minister (as the previous prime minister may have resigned), but they are nevertheless generally constrained to choose the person most likely to have the support of parliament. In other situations, the use of reserve powers can create a constitutional crisis, especially where the head of state's decision is questioned and where it cannot be legally challenged. Examples of this include the dismissal of the Australian prime minister by the governor-general in 1975 and the refusal of the Canadian governor general to dissolve parliament and call an election in 1926.

In some cases, whether the advice is mandatory or truly just advisory depends on the context and authority of the person offering it. For example, while both the Basic Law of Germany and the Constitution of Italy state that government ministers are appointed by the respective country's president on the advice of its prime minister (Chancellor in Germany; President of the Council of Ministers in Italy), the Italian president has the right to refuse to follow the advice in certain conditions (such as protecting the separation of powers or when the ministerial appointment forms a conflict of interest), while the German president must follow the advice of the chancellor in appointing ministers.

== See also ==
- Advice and consent
- Constitutional economics
- Constitutionalism
- Rule according to higher law
