= Constitutional conventions of the United Kingdom =

Informal generally accepted code

The United Kingdom has an uncodified constitution. The constitution consists of legislation, common law, Crown prerogative and constitutional conventions. Conventions may be written or unwritten. They are principles of behaviour which are not legally enforceable, but form part of the constitution by being enforced on a political, professional or personal level. Written conventions can be found in the Ministerial Code, Cabinet Manual, Guide to Judicial Conduct, Erskine May and even legislation. Unwritten conventions exist by virtue of long-practice or may be referenced in other documents such as the Lascelles Principles.

== Parliamentary conventions ==
=== House of Commons ===
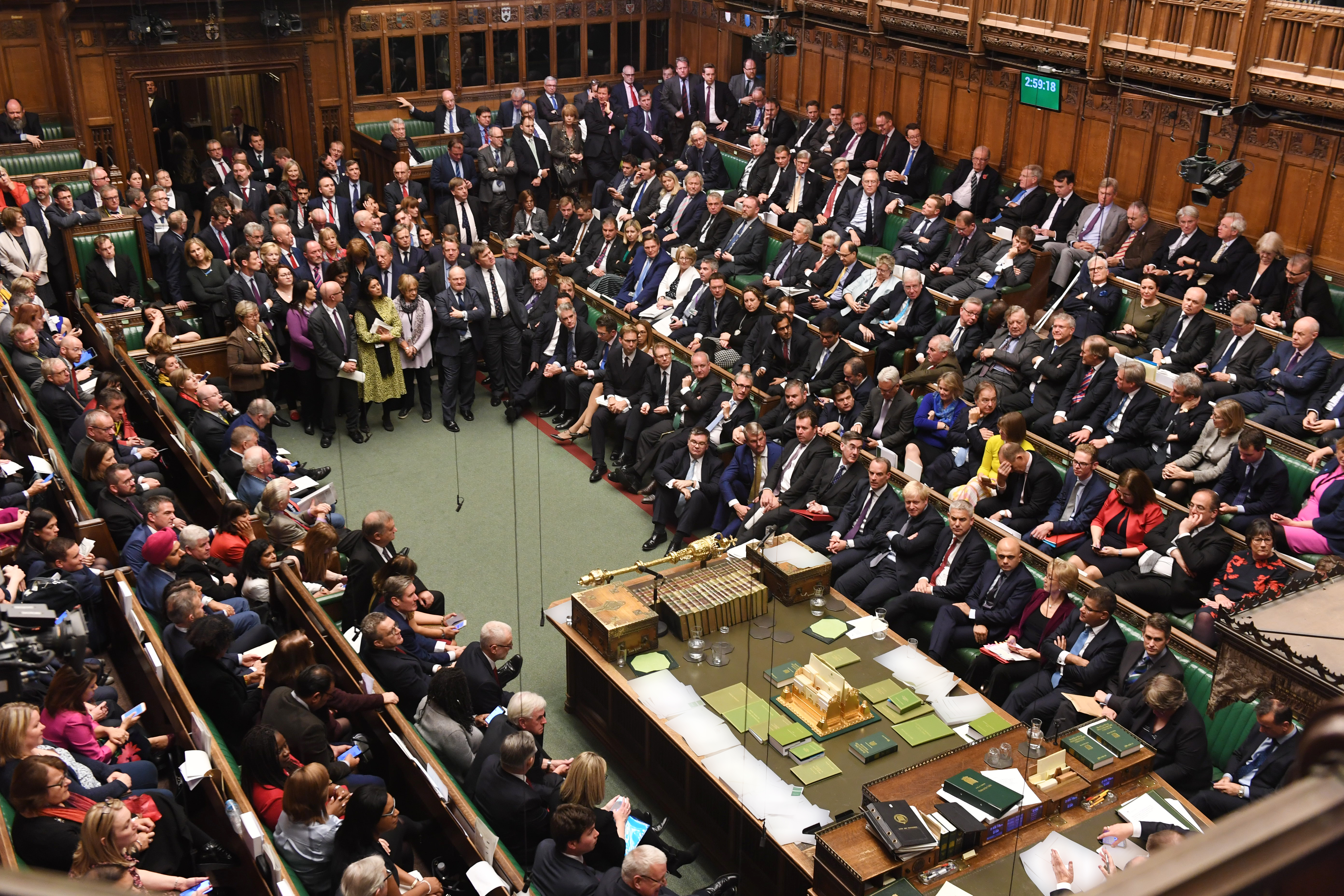
A full House of Commons debates Brexit during a rare Saturday sitting. View from the top corner of the House to the left of the Speaker's chair.

==== Speaking in the House ====
Members should address the House through the chair (typically "Mr/Madam Speaker/Deputy Speaker").

Members should address each other in the third person and by position ("the Lord Chancellor alleges" or "the Honourable Member asserted...") or constituency ("last week the Member for Harrow East said in this House...").

Speaking notes are not allowed save for opening speeches, maiden speeches or where particular detail is necessary.

Maiden speeches should occur without interruption. The speaker is congratulated by at least the following two speakers and front bench.

Ministers sit on the front benches to the right of the Speaker, the Chief Whip usually sits immediately next to the gangway. Parliamentary Private Secretaries usually sit immediately behind their minister. Official opposition leadership sit in the front row to the left of the Speaker. Minority party members sit in the back rows below the gangway on the left.

==== Attendance ====
Members are expected to be present from the beginning of a debate and remain for at least two speeches after their own and return for closing speeches.

The chair generally calls members from alternating sides and prioritises those who have been present for a longer period.

Members will formally notify each other when making a formal visit to the other's constituency.

==== The Speaker ====
During a general election, the Speaker will stand for election in their constituency unopposed by the major parties. During the election, the Speaker will only campaign as a Speaker seeking re-election and not on any political points.

- This convention was not respected during the 1987 general election, when both the Labour Party and the Social Democratic Party fielded candidates against the Conservative speaker, Bernard Weatherill, who was MP for Croydon North East.
- The Scottish National Party (SNP) does stand against the speaker if they represent a Scottish constituency, as was the case with Michael Martin, speaker from 2000 to 2009.
- The Conservative Party threatened to stand a candidate against Speaker John Bercow in Buckingham at the 2019 general election due to perceived biases in rulings in relation to Brexit debates. However Bercow stepped down as an MP and as Speaker before this threatened breach of convention could occur.

The Speaker enjoys wide discretion to interpret the Standing Orders and relevance of precedent. They decide the procedure of the House.

==== Procedure ====
Constitutional bills will be taken in a committee of the whole House.

Forthwith motions are put without debate or amendment.

Same Question Rule – The same or substantially similar motion will not be debated twice in the same parliamentary session.

Money resolutions are provided on a case-by-case assessment.

- This alters the original conventions, that government will provide a money resolution for any private members bill receiving a second reading.

General debates under Standing Order 24 (Emergency Debates) will not be amended, and will be neutral in tone.

The submission or rejection of an urgent question by the Speaker is not referred to publicly.

Members of His Majesty's Opposition front bench (the Shadow Cabinet) should be made privy councillors so that information can be shared with them on "privy council terms".

==== Accountability ====
Any member that misleads Parliament is expected to resign.

The Prime Minister will attend the House for Prime Minister's Questions. Where the Prime Minister cannot attend, either their deputy or another senior minister must act as a replacement.

- This convention is now firmly established, although the exact structure, length and regularity of questions has been varied by different prime ministers.

==== Relationship to House of Lords ====
The Commons has primacy over the Lords.

The Salisbury Convention – The Lords will give a second reading to government bills on manifesto commitments, a manifesto bill will not be significantly amended by "wrecking amendments" which fundamentally alter its substance, a relevant bill will be sent to the Commons in sufficient time to deal with any amendments.

Commons Financial Privilege – The Lords will not oppose or make wrecking amendments to bills dealing with taxation or expenditure. Where such an amendment is made, the bill will be returned to the Lords with a note indicating a breach of the convention.

Delegated legislation (statutory instruments) should only rarely be objected to by the Lords.

=== House of Lords ===
==== Speaking in the House ====
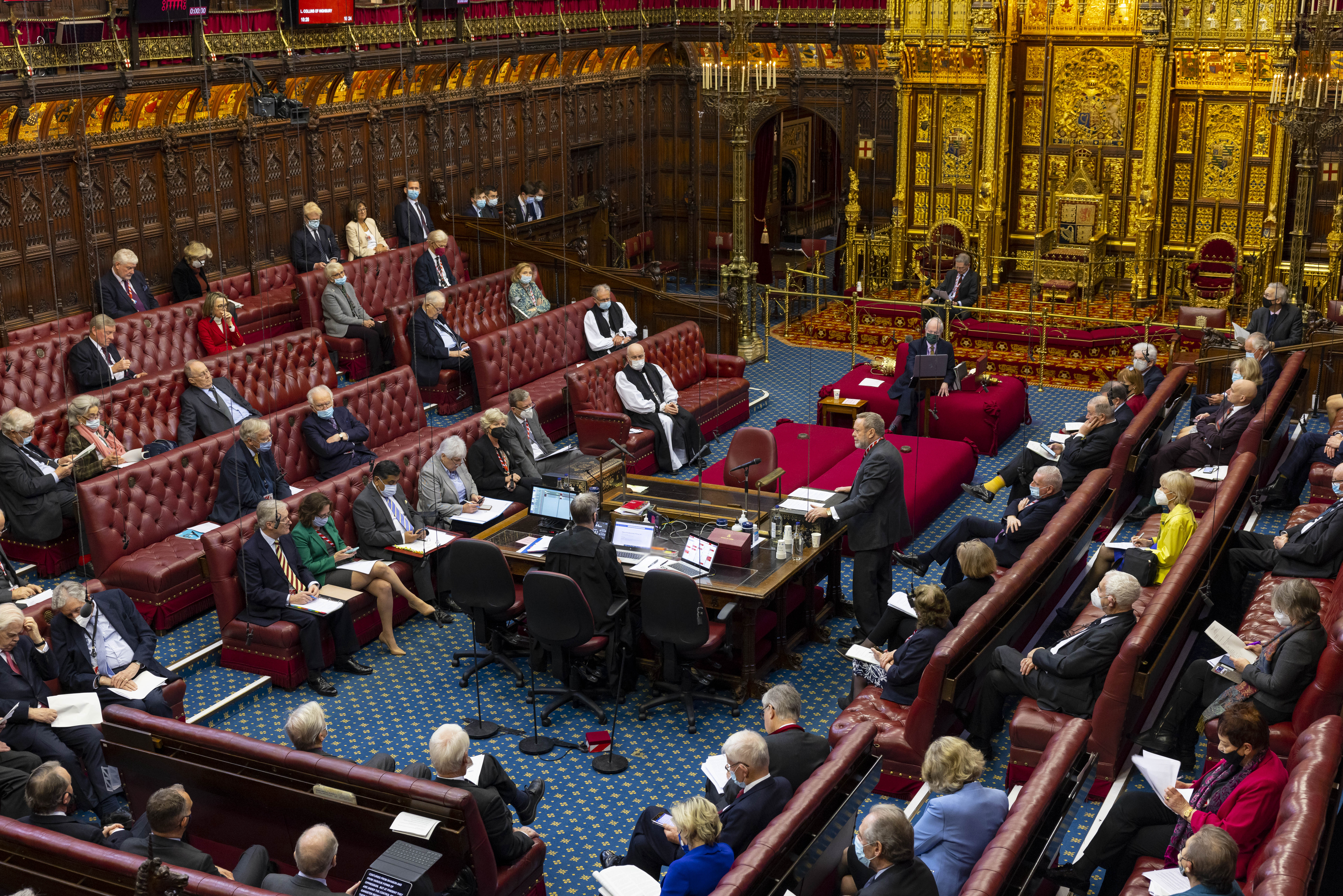
The House of Lords debates the 2022 Russian invasion of Ukraine. The Lord Speaker can be seen to the rear, seated on the woolsack.

Members should refer to each other by title or position.

Speeches may not be read, though there may be extensive use of notes.

Members should attend the greater part of debates and at least the opening, winding-up speeches and the two proceeding their own speech.

Maiden and valedictory speeches should be short and uncontroversial; they should be heard without interruption (members should remain seated throughout). Maiden speakers should be congratulated by the next speaker and the front bench if they choose.

Commonly, the House rises by 10pm on Mondays-Wednesdays, 7pm on Thursdays and 3pm on Fridays though this is often varied.

==== Procedure ====
The Legislative Office advice on the orderliness of amendments to bills will be followed.

== Executive-Parliament relations ==
Collective ministerial responsibility – All ministers, taken together as the government, are jointly accountable to Parliament for the government's actions and policies.

Confidence motions (votes of "no confidence") - The Prime Minister must tender the resignation of the government if defeated in a confidence motion.

Where a vote of no confidence against the government is submitted by the official opposition, the government must give it time for a debate and vote in the Commons. It is decided by simple majority.

- This convention was potentially challenged in 2022 by the refusal of the Johnson Government to allow a vote of no confidence by Labour following the resignation of Boris Johnson. The motion called for no confidence in "Her Majesty's Government while [Boris Johnson] remains Prime Minister". However the convention only applies to votes related to the entire government, not a particular minister or the Prime Minister. Johnson's supporters claimed that the convention did not therefore apply. Many variations of confidence motions have historically fallen within this convention, for example Edward Heath's motion: "That this House has no confidence in Her Majesty's Government and deplores the Prime Minister's conduct of the nation's affairs." In response, the Johnson Government then offered a vote of no confidence in itself with alternate wording omitting the direct mention of the Prime Minister.
- A previous convention held that any government defeated on a matter of major policy should resign. The Fixed Term Parliaments Act 2011 undercut this principle, though it is unclear as to its current standing given the Dissolution and Calling of Parliament Act 2022. Jacqy Sharpe suggests that the same end could be achieved by selecting an alternative PM whom the incumbent PM would be expected to recommend to the sovereign.

Military intervention overseas – Except in exceptional circumstances, the House should debate and possibly vote on military deployments overseas.

- This convention was recognised in 2011 by the Coalition government, who suggested the emergence of a convention since 2003, starting with debates in the House regarding military intervention in Iraq. The precedent is generally thought to have been cemented by the 2013 vote on military intervention in Syria. The government respected the parliamentary vote not to undertake military intervention in the conflict, despite the prerogative power to order military action allowing for unilateral government action.
- The convention remains unsettled. Jacqy Sharpe of the Constitution Society has suggested it includes a requirement that Parliament votes on the proposed intervention, but this is disputed by the Commons Library briefing paper on the convention.

Pre-election period of sensitivity - Ministers should avoid implementing new initiatives or making significant announcements during a pre-election period.

Prorogation – The Prime Minister advises the sovereign on when to end a parliamentary session.

The Sewel Convention – The Sewel Convention requires that the Westminster Parliament will only legislate on reserved matters. It will not legislate on non-reserved matters ("devolved matters") without first seeking the consent of the relevant devolved legislature.

Similar to the above, Parliament shall not legislate for nor the government intervene in decisions taken by the local legislatures of the British Overseas Territories (formerly Crown Colonies) without their consent.

- A challenge to this was made when Southern Rhodesia unilaterally declared independence as Rhodesia in 1965 and Parliament passed the Southern Rhodesia Act 1965 in response, which was largely ignored in Rhodesia with the local government citing the constitutional convention.
- The convention was also considered in 2018 in Bermuda when the governor referred to the British government about possibly withholding royal assent from the Domestic Partnership Act 2018 which would recriminalise same-sex marriage. The government declined to recommend denial of assent, citing the convention and the act was made law.

== Role of the sovereign ==
The sovereign will appoint as prime minister the person who can command the confidence of the Commons, typically this command is by being the leader of the majority party.

- The Cabinet Manual makes clear: "the Sovereign should not be drawn into party politics, and if there is doubt it is the responsibility of those involved in the political process, and in particular the parties represented in parliament, to seek to determine and communicate clearly to the Sovereign who is best placed to be able to command the confidence of the House of Commons."

The government will seek consent from the monarch even for bills of which it disapproves.

The government will always advise the monarch to assent to any bill passed by both Houses.

No bill expected to be passed should be delayed i.e. the bills will be included in the letters patent used to demonstrate assent.

Most prerogative powers are exercised by, or on the advice of, ministers.

The sovereign should not be involved in party politics in any way.

The Lascelles Principles – The sovereign should follow the three conventional principles in accepting the resignation of a serving prime minister.

Retiring PMs should advise the sovereign on who should be invited to form the next government.

Ministerial communication with the sovereign should remain confidential.

== Devolved parliaments ==
=== Scottish Parliament ===
The Sewel Convention applies to the Scottish Parliament.

=== Welsh Senedd ===
Statutory instruments (SI) should be laid before the Senedd at least 21 days before coming into force. This is colloquially known as the 21-day rule. If breached, the Welsh Ministers must notify the Presiding Officer of this fact when the SI is laid and explain the reasons why it was late.

The Sewel Convention applies to the Senedd.

=== Northern Irish Assembly ===
The Sewel Convention applies to the Northern Irish Assembly.

== Conventions relating to legal processes ==
=== Law Officer conventions ===
The law officers are the primary legal advisers to the Crown.

The Law Officers' Convention – The advice of Law Officers is not usually disclosed.

- The Cabinet Manual states the convention operates as follows: the fact that the Law Officers have advised, or have not advised, and the content of their advice may not be disclosed outside government without their authority. The Law Officers’ advice to government is subject to legal professional privilege (LPP) and is confidential.

The Shawcross Convention – The Law Officers may consult with other ministers as to the 'public interest' when making prosecution decisions, but must make the decision entirely on their own judgement and without party political pressure, interest or favour.

A further convention in relation to Law Officer advice, operating on other ministers, is that the Law Officers must be consulted by ministers or their officials in good time before the government is committed to critical decisions involving legal considerations.

=== Independence of the judiciary ===
The government must uphold the independence of the judiciary.

- Since 2005 this convention has been overtaken by the statutory obligations placed on the Lord Chancellor under the 'guarantee of continued judicial independence' at section 3 Constitutional Reform Act 2005.

Ministers will not criticise judicial decisions; judges will not criticise government policy.

Members of the judiciary will not comment on political issues while serving.

== Legal status of conventions ==
A fundamental principle underlying the constitutional convention is that it is not subject to enforcement by a court of law. While this has been a long-held position followed by the courts, it was made explicit in the case of Miller (No 1), where the Supreme Court made clear that while the courts could take account of the fact that conventions were operating in a particular area, they were not legally enforceable. The Supreme Court affirmed the view of Professor Colin Munro that 'the validity of conventions cannot be the subject of proceedings in a court of law'.

Judges...are neither the parents nor the guardians of political conventions; they are merely observers. As such, they can recognise the operation of a political convention in the context of deciding a legal question ...but they cannot give legal rulings on its operation or scope, because those matters are determined within the political world..

— R (on the application of Miller and another) v Secretary of State for Exiting the European Union [2017] UKSC 5, "Miller No 1"

=== Legislated conventions ===
The Supreme Court have continued to affirm the view that conventions remain unenforceable in law despite being included in statute, so long as the legislation still expresses these conventions as merely conventions. Section 2 of the Scotland Act 2016 and Wales Act 2017 placed the Sewel convention within legislation. However, recognising the existence of the convention within legislation did not alter the status of the convention. The Supreme Court in Miller No 1 confirmed the status of the Sewel Convention as only a convention and not legally enforceable.

[B]y such provisions, the UK Parliament is not seeking to convert the Sewel Convention into a rule which can be interpreted, let alone enforced, by the courts; rather, it is recognising the convention for what it is, namely a political convention, and is effectively declaring that it is a permanent feature of the relevant devolution settlement. That follows from the nature of the content, and is acknowledged by the words (“it is recognised” and “will not normally”), of the relevant subsection. We would have expected UK Parliament to have used other words if it were seeking to convert a convention into a legal rule justiciable by the courts.

— R (on the application of Miller and another) v Secretary of State for Exiting the European Union [2017] UKSC 5, "Miller No 1"

In taking this view, the court noted 'the practical benefits of achieving harmony between legislatures in areas of competing competence' which would require the retained capacity of the Westminster Parliament to avoiding duplication of effort, enable the UK Parliament to make UK-wide legislation where appropriate and avoid any risk of legal challenge to the authority of the devolved legislatures.

=== See also ===
- Ponsonby Rule
