= Walter Roban =

Bermudian politician (born 1966)

The Honourable Walter Roban JP

11th Deputy Premier of Bermuda
- In office 19 July 2017 – 25 February 2025
- Monarchs: Elizabeth II; Charles III
- Premier: Edward David Burt
- Governor: John Rankin; Rena Lalgie; Andrew Murdoch
- Preceded by: Everard T. (Bob) Richards
- Succeeded by: Zane DeSilva

Deputy Leader of the Progressive Labour Party
- In office 7 November 2016 – 18 February 2025
- Leader: Edward David Burt
- Preceded by: Edward David Burt
- Succeeded by: Zane DeSilva

Minister of Home Affairs
- In office 1 November 2018 – 25 February 2025
- Premier: Edward David Burt
- Preceded by: Walton Brown
- Succeeded by: Alexa Lightbourne
Further information
Minister of Transport and Regulatory Affairs
In office 19 July 2017 – 1 November 2018
Premier	Edward David Burt
Preceded by	Michael Fahy
Succeeded by	Zane DeSilva
Minister of Public Works
In office 2 November 2011 – 17 November 2011
Premier	Paula Cox
Preceded by	Derrick Burgess
Succeeded by	Michael Weeks
Minister of the Environment, Planning, and Infrastructure Strategy
In office 1 November 2010 – 2 November 2011
Premier	Paula Cox
Preceded by	Glenn Blakeney
Succeeded by	Marc Bean
Minister of Health
In office 4 September 2009 – 1 November 2010
Premier	Ewart Brown
Preceded by	Nelson Bascome
Succeeded by	Zane DeSilva
Minister without Portfolio
In office 23 June 2009 – 4 September 2009
Premier	Ewart Brown
Preceded by	Walter Lister
Succeeded by	Zane DeSilva
Junior Minister for Labour, Home Affairs and Housing
In office 20 December 2007 – 23 June 2009
Premier	Ewart Brown
Shadow Minister of National Security
In office 10 November 2016 – 18 July 2017
Leader	Edward David Burt
Preceded by	Michael Dunkley
Succeeded by	Jeff Baron
Shadow Minister of Home Affairs
In office 3 December 2015 – 10 December 2016
Leader	Marc Bean
Succeeded by	Walton Brown
Shadow Minister of Public Safety
In office 30 April 2014 – 3 December 2015
Leader	Marc Bean
Preceded by	Michael Scott
Member of the Parliament of Bermuda for Pembroke East
In office 18 December 2007 – 18 February 2025
Preceded by	Ottiwell Simmons
Succeeded by	Owen Darrell
Member of the Senate of Bermuda
In office 30 July 2003 – 27 October 2006
Appointed by	Alex Scott
General Secretary of the Progressive Labour Party
In office 14 November 1995 – 30 August 1999
Leader	Jennifer M. Smith
Preceded by	LaVerne Furbert
Succeeded by	Neville Tyrell

Personal details
- Born: Walter Henri Roban; 13 August 1966 (age 59); Birmingham, West Midlands, England
- Party: Progressive Labour Party
- Spouse: Nadine Francis (m. 2018)
- Children: 1
- Education: Mount Saint Agnes Academy; Fryeburg Academy
- Alma mater: Morehouse College (BBA); University of Birmingham (MA)
- Website: walterroban.com

Walter Henri Roban (born 13 August 1966) is a former Bermudian politician who served as the 11th Deputy Premier of Bermuda. He retired in February 2025, having served concurrently as Minister of Home Affairs. Roban was Deputy Leader of the Progressive Labour Party (PLP) from November 2016 to February 2025.

== Early life and education ==
Roban was born in Birmingham, England to Matthew Roban, originally from St. Vincent and the Grenadines and Charlotte Powell (nee Pavy) of Bermuda. He attended Mount Saint Agnes Academy and graduated from Robert Crawford High School. His interest in Civics, Social Studies, and History developed under educator Dale Butler, who brought Caribbean and African history to life for him.

After finishing secondary school in Bermuda, Roban attended Fryeburg Academy in Maine, United States. Returning home to Bermuda, he briefly attended Bermuda College. He earned a bachelor's degree in Business and International Studies from Morehouse College in Atlanta, Georgia and a master's degree in International Studies from the University of Birmingham, UK, focusing on international politics and foreign policy analysis.

Professionally, Roban worked as a paralegal researcher at the law firm Milligan-Whyte & Smith, and in banking roles at HSBC and Bank of Bermuda.

During his time in Atlanta, he worked on Maynard Jackson’s 1989 mayoral campaign, giving him the opportunity to witness the 1988 Democratic National Convention, where Jesse Jackson campaigned for the presidency. This had a huge impact on the future minister. It was during this election that Roban met several leaders of the PLP, an experience that influenced his decision to return to Bermuda and engage in local politics.

== Early political involvement ==
Roban joined the Progressive Labour Party in the late 1980s, serving as chairman of its youth wing, Progressive Youth (1991-1993) and General Secretary of the PLP (1995-1999).

He contributed to policy development and served as an aide to opposition leader L. Frederick Wade. He served on the PLP Campaign Committee in 1993 on the Public Relations Team and later as Deputy Chair of the PLP Campaign Committee between 1996 and 1998. Following the PLP General Election victory in 1998, Roban also chaired Bermuda’s Ports Authority from 1998 to 1999. He served again as Ports Authority Chair from 2000 to 2003

== Parliamentary roles ==
Appointed to the Senate in 2003, Roban served until 2006, overseeing legislation establishing the Bermuda Health Council and introducing mental health reforms. Between 2007 and 2009, he served as Junior Minister for Home Affairs. He was elected to the House of Assembly for Pembroke East Central in 2007 and held junior ministerial roles, including Tourism & Transport, Health & Family Services, and Education & Development.

Roban joined the cabinet in 2009 as Minister Without Portfolio with responsibility for Municipal Reform. He later held portfolios including Health, the Environment, Planning, Infrastructure, and briefly, Public Works. In 2012, he served as Minister of Transport, introducing GPS systems for taxis.

After serving as Shadow Minister (2012 to 2017), Roban was appointed Deputy Leader of the PLP IN November 2016. He became Deputy Premier following the PLP's victory in 2017, subsequently overseeing Transport, Regulatory Affairs, and Home Affairs portfolios.

=== Controversies ===
Roban resigned briefly from cabinet in 2011 after overturning two planning decisions involving PLP colleagues, related to protected environmental and agricultural lands. These decisions were reversed by his successor.

In 2023, Roban faced criticism for similarly overturning planning refusals related to developments near Devonshire Marsh, against professional recommendations.

Roban publicly clashed with the Bermuda Electric Light Company (BELCO) and the Regulatory Authority over pollution issues and electricity rate increases in 2023, threatening legal action against the Regulatory Authority.

== Environmental initiatives ==
As Minister of Transport, Roban initiated the conversion of Bermuda’s bus fleet from internal combustion engine to electric vehicles.

As Minister of the Environment (2010), Roban supported the creation of the Sargasso Sea Commission, an advisory body established to develop conservation methods for the Sargasso Sea in 2014. He led Bermuda's "Blue Prosperity Plan" (2019), which aimed to establish Marine Protected Areas covering 20% of the island's waters. He represented Bermuda internationally, advocating renewable energy and climate resilience, including at COP26 and the United Nations Ocean Conference.

Roban received the Caribbean Renewable Energy Forum's "Renewable Energy Leader MVP" award in 2021. He was selected to be the inaugural chair of The Blue Prosperity Leader’s Forum, leading Bermuda, the Maldives, the Azores, Vanuatu and the Federated States of Micronesia from 2022 to 2024.

== Retirement ==
Roban announced in July 2024 he would retire from politics at the end of his term. One of his final actions as Minister of Home Affairs was signing a land lease agreement with Google in February 2025 for a subsea cable project connecting Bermuda, Portugal, and the United States.
