= Ottiwell Simmons =

Bermudian labour leader and politician (1933–2023)

Ottiwell Askew Simmons (June 25, 1933 – June 16, 2023) was a labour leader and politician in Bermuda, known for his role as president of the Bermuda Industrial Union (BIU) from 1974 to 1996. He served from 1976 until 2007 as a Progressive Labour Party member of parliament for Pembroke East.

== Early life ==
Ottiwell Simmons, also known as Ottie, was born in 1933. He was one of seven children born to Olaf and Audrey Simmons, who raised him in North Village in Bermuda's Pembroke Parish.

As a boy, he was inspired after hearing Edgar F. Gordon, then the president of the Bermuda Industrial Union (BIU), give a speech. He was also moved by his own experiences of racial inequality. Unable to gain admission to the island's elite high school, he began working at 15 years of age as a plumber's assistant, taxi driver, and waiter, and in his late teens he married and started a family. His first efforts as an activist came at the age of 20, when he was working as a waiter at a hotel on the island and attempted to lead a walkout over how Black customers were treated there. He eventually attended night school at the Technical Institute.

== Career ==
In 1958, at the age of 25, Simmons joined the BIU. At 36, he was encouraged by a British administrator to attend Oxford University's Ruskin College, where he spent two years studying economics and sociology. He received further training in union organizing while abroad, becoming the BIU's first full-time organizer when he came home. Then, in 1974, he was elected president of the union. He led the BIU during the 1981 Bermuda general strike, the first general strike in the country's history. He was also involved in the 1965 BELCO strike and in negotiations around the 1992 Labour Disputes Act. He faced vilification from his political opponents for his work as a labour leader. Simmons remained as president of the union until 1996.

Simmons also won office as a member of the Progressive Labour Party, representing Pembroke East in the House of Assembly from 1976 to 2007. He collaborated closely with fellow MP Nelson Bascome, and worked to promote social reforms to benefit Bermuda's working class.

== Later years, death and legacy ==
In 2010, Simmons wrote Our Lady of Labour, about fellow politician and activist Barbara Ball.

The BIU's building, whose construction Simmons had directed in 1987, was renamed in his honor in 2019.

Simmons died in 2023, just shy of his 90th birthday. On his death, he was recognized as a "lion of the labour movement" who was known for "greatly changing the island's sociopolitical landscape."
