= 1981 general strike in Bielsko-Biała =

The 1981 general strike in Bielsko-Biała took place between January 27 and February 6, 1981, in the southern Polish city of Bielsko-Biała, It was the first strike action during the final decade of Communist Poland which was "purely political" in the sense of aiming directly at Communist Party officials without economic demands, such as calls higher wages. It resulted in the removal of several corrupt officials of the local administration.

== Background ==
On January 27, 1981, a general strike began in Bielsko-Biała, and other locations in the area. All major enterprises, including mass transit, factories and most shops, stopped working. Local leaders of Solidarity demanded what was considered impossible at the time - removal of corrupt local officials, including governor of Bielsko-Biała Voivodeship, mayor of the city of Bielsko-Biała, and First Secretary of Bielsko-Biała's office of the Communist Party. Patrycjusz Kosmowski, the local Solidarity leader, who organized the protest, said thirty years after the strike: "Everybody knew that the government was stealing and defrauding. Everybody talked about it, but nobody did anything. We managed to change it!"

The protest in Bielsko-Biała was unique in the fact that it was purely political. Workers did not demand any pay raises; they demanded change in local government and the removal of Communist elite, whose members had been universally regarded as “the untouchables”. As Kosmowski said, at that time ordinary people did not trust the authorities. Instead, local residents would come to the local office of Solidarity, bringing information about corruption among civil servants, party officials and Communist police officers. Some information, including documentation, was brought to Kosmowski and his people by a female employee of the governor’s office, who supported Solidarity.

== First protests ==
The accusations were publicly expressed as early as November 20, 1980, during a weekly meeting of Solidarity leaders of the Bielsko-Biała Podbeskidzie region of Solidarity. Union officials issued a statement, in which they demanded removal of local authorities, due to “a loss of social capital”. Next day, a delegation of Solidarity met with a delegation of the government. Talks were unsuccessful, and the union planned immediate sit-in of the governor’s office. Instead, Solidarity declared readiness to strike, demanding that central government officials come from Warsaw for negotiations. A few days later, in late November 1980, Minister of Administration Józef Kępa came to Bielsko-Biała. He met with Solidarity leaders, promising to open a special committee, which would investigate allegations of corruption. Among members of the committee, there were four Solidarity activists.

The committee completed its work on January 13, 1981. Most charges turned out to be valid, and several new cases of corruption were uncovered. The 150-page report described frauds committed by city and provincial authorities, as well as Party leaders. Most cases referred to selling real estate properties at reduced prices to chosen buyers (for example, a tenement house at Cieszyńska Street in Bielsko-Biała, in which a kindergarten had been planned, ended up in the hands of a Party official), as well as defrauding 34 million zlotys, which had been collected by local inhabitants to build Okrąglak - a multipurpose arena complex. The money disappeared and nobody knew where it was. Also, there were cases of tax evasion, bribery and partisan distribution of ration stamps to purchase passenger vehicles (stamps to purchase the coveted Fiat 126, manufactured at Bielsko-Biała’s Fabryka Samochodów Małolitrażowych, almost exclusively were handed to Party officials.

Józef Łabudek, the governor of Bielsko-Biała Voivodeship did not accept the findings of the committee, and Solidarity leaders realized that he simply tried to play for time. On January 18, 1981, local Interfactory Founding Committee (MKZ) of Solidarity, which represented 350 enterprises of the province, demanded that central government officials return to Bielsko-Biała, to further look into the charges, and to remove corrupt officials. Warsaw, however, did not respond, so strike warning was issued.

== The strike ==
On Monday, January 26, a one-hour warning strike took place in selected enterprises of Bielsko-Biala and the region (Skoczów, Żywiec, Kęty, Andrychów, Sucha Beskidzka). On the same day, the Interfactory Founding Committee changed its name to Interfactory Strike Committee (MKS), with 107 members of 54 enterprises of the province. The MKS had its main office at the club-room of Cotton Plant Bewelana in Bielsko-Biała, which had previously been the location of weekly meetings of regional Solidarity leaders. In that club-room, some 400 people stayed for ten days.

The strike started on Tuesday, January 27, and most enterprises of the Voivodeship took part in it. In Bielsko-Biała itself, the only businesses that did not participate in it were hospitals, railroads, delivery services, and telecommunications companies. In the course of the time, additional enterprises joined the protest, and activists of Rural Solidarity brought food to the workers, who occupied their factories. Crews of striking enterprises were very determined, and what they needed most were news updates. Every few hours, several times a day, strike bulletins were copied and distributed to thousands of people. Negotiations at Bewelana were broadcast live to most local factories, due to the efforts of Solidarity telecommunications experts, who created a network, which connected all radio stations of the enterprises.

Local government was helpless, and the Interfactory Strike Committee became the center of power in the region, with 200,000 people actively participating in the protest. Negotiations, which took place in early February, failed, and soon afterwards, Solidarity leaders Lech Wałęsa, Andrzej Gwiazda and Stanisław Wądołowski came to Bielsko-Biała, together with their advisers Tadeusz Mazowiecki and Bronisław Geremek. Wałęsa and his people at first opposed the strike, for two reasons. Firstly, Bielsko-Biała's Solidarity activists organized it without consultation the union’s national leadership body. Secondly, at that time national negotiations were taking place in Warsaw, and local protests did not help Solidarity. Therefore, Wałęsa came to Bielsko-Biała to end the strike, but after finding out about the situation in the region, and seeing the determination of the people, he changed his mind and supported the protest. Furthermore, he warned the government that a national strike would take place, if force was used against workers in Bielsko-Biała. As time went by, the situation became dramatic. All talks were broken, and people talked among themselves that the authorities were considering the use of force.

== Agreement ==
The situation changed during the night of February 5/6, 1981, when a delegation of the Polish Episcopal Conference arrived at Bielsko-Biała. It was sent there by Primate Stefan Wyszyński, and it consisted of Bishops Bronisław Dąbrowski, Janusz Zimniak, and Czesław Domin. Soon afterwards, the delegation of the government entered the club-room of Bewelana, headed by Minister of Administration Józef Kępa, and his deputy Czesław Kotela.

The negotiations lasted the whole night, ending at 5am on February 6, 1981. An agreement was signed, acceding to the protesting workers' demands. In accord with the agreement, provincial governor Józef Łabudek and his two deputies (Antoni Kobiela and Antoni Urbaniec) resigned on that day, and the new governor, Stanisław Łuczkiewicz, was obliged to punish those guilty of corruption. Other officials who were removed from their posts were local leaders of the Party, mayor of Bielsko-Biała Marian Kałoń (replaced by little known Jacek Krywułt), his deputy Franciszek Holeksa, chief of police, Colonel Ryszard Witek, as well as a number of civil servants.

== See also ==
- Lublin 1980 strikes
- Jastrzębie-Zdrój 1980 strikes
- Summer 1981 hunger demonstrations in Poland
- 1981 warning strike in Poland
- 1988 Polish strikes
