= Bermuda Industrial Union =

BIU
- Bermuda Industrial Union
- United We Stand, Divided We Fall
- Founded: 1946
- Headquarters: Hamilton, Bermuda
- Location: Bermuda
- Members: 4200
- Key people: Molly Burgess, general secretary
- Affiliations: ITUC, PSI

The Bermuda Industrial Union (BIU) is a general trade union in Bermuda and has a membership of 4200. It was founded in 1946 taking over from the Bermuda Workers' Association which continued as the BIU political arm.

The BIU is affiliated to the International Trade Union Confederation, and Public Services International.

== History ==
The Bermuda Industrial Union was founded by Edgar Fitzgerald Gordon to facilitate collective bargaining of working class Bermudians at a time when the work force was predominantly composed of black Bermudians who were disenfranchised because of property requirements that controlled the right to vote. Gordon served as its president until his 1955 death, and one of BIU's most influential leaders was Dr. Barbara Ball, who became the General Secretary of the organization in 1962. As a white woman, she spoke out against unequal labor and pay practices based on race, earning the respect of black Bermudians, and disdain from other whites.

BIU became the largest and most influential trade union in the country, by centralizing its organization and branching to address the needs of various industry segments, like electricians, hospital staff, hotel workers, and street maintenance personnel. In its early days, between 1946 and 1960, multiple strike actions resulted in some gains for workers, but after 1960, when Ottiwell Simmons, a trained union organizer became president, BIU became a professional organization focusing on training organizers and functionaries. Until the 1981 general strike the labor negotiations of the BIU were able to maintain a calm during collective bargaining processes.
