= Thomas Nisbett =

Bermudian priest (1925–2024)

Thomas Norman Nisbett OBE (24 October 1925 – 2 April 2024) was a Bermudian carpenter, cabinet maker, house builder, and Anglican priest. Born in North Village, Pembroke, Bermuda, he was the first black Anglican priest of the Anglican Church of Bermuda.

== Parentage and career ==
His parents, now deceased, were Elijah John Nisbett, born 13 October 1892 in Cedar Hill Village, St. George, Nevis, West Indies, and Adina Miller, born 14 February 1898 in Nevis, West Indies.

Elijah Nisbett left Nevis in 1922 and went to Bermuda, where he stayed with friends until he could build a house on St. Monica's Road across from the St. Monica's Mission Church: Adina, and daughters Mavis and Lauret immigrated to Bermuda in 1923.

Thomas Nisbett was educated at Central School, Bermuda, and Codrington College, Barbados.

In his younger years, he was a member of the popular Bermudian a cappella singing group, the Nisbett Brothers.

Nisbett held a number of key ecclesiastical and community positions in both Barbados and Bermuda, and he was appointed Officer of the Order of the British Empire (OBE) in the 1992 New Year Honours for services to the community. In 2012 Nisbett was awarded the Order of Saint Mellitus by the bishop of London for his contribution to the Church in Bermuda and elsewhere.

== Personal life ==
Nisbett was married on 4 August 1954 to Winifred M. G. (née Smith) Nisbett (1931–2011), a primary school teacher, and former president of the Bermuda Reading Association and a past chairman of the International Reading Association Caribbean Committee, New Orleans, Louisiana. He became a canon of the church.

They had two sons: Thomas W. L. Nisbett, an Anglican clergyman in the Anglican Diocese of Fredericton and former businessman living in New Brunswick, Canada, and Michael John Nisbett, an administrator with the Bermuda Hospitals Board living in Pembroke, Bermuda.

Michael John Nisbett is the owner/webmaster of Christian Resource Centre at www.crcbermuda.com.

His granddaughter is Canadian singer/songwriter, Chelsea Nisbett, also known under the professional name, Chelsea Amber.

An interview with Nisbett can be seen at Canon Thomas Nisbett profile.

The sermon preached by Ewen Ratteray, Anglican bishop of Bermuda, at the celebration in thanksgiving for the 40th anniversary of the ordination of Thomas Nisbett on 11 January 2004, can be found at www.anglican.bm/2004-02.html

Thomas Nisbett died on 2 April 2024, at the age of 98.
