= Domestic Partnership Act 2018 =

Domestic Partnerships Act 2018

Parliament of Bermuda
- Citation: Act No.1 of 2018
- Royal assent: 7 February 2018
- Signed by: Governor John Rankin
- Commenced: 1 June 2018
- Introduced by: Walter Roban

Keywords
- same-sex marriage, domestic partnership
- Status: Current legislation

The Domestic Partnership Act 2018 is an act of the Parliament of Bermuda. It provided for the creation of domestic partnerships for both same-sex and opposite-sex couples and prohibited same-sex marriage, making the Parliament of Bermuda the first legislature to abolish same-sex marriage after it was initially legalised.

== Background ==
The Domestic Partnership Bill was introduced in 2017 after the Supreme Court of Bermuda ruled that homosexuals should have the same rights to marry as heterosexual couples, judicially legalising same-sex marriage. After the ruling, the Minister for Home Affairs, Walter Roban, brought the bill before the Bermuda House of Assembly designed to create a separate institution of unions for same-sex couples. The Bill passed the House with a 24–10 majority and also passed through the Senate with an 8–3 majority.

The bill then went to the Governor of Bermuda for Royal assent on behalf of Queen Elizabeth II, which is legally required to be given to bills that have passed both houses in order for them to become law. Governor John Rankin delayed granting consent in order to consult with the British Foreign and Commonwealth Office. Following this, a number of international media outlets and politicians called on him to refuse to grant royal assent. A debate in the British House of Commons, led by the Labour Party's Chris Bryant, called on the Foreign Secretary Boris Johnson to block the bill. Minister Sir Alan Duncan said that the government was "disappointed" but would not block the introduction of the act, citing the constitutional convention that the British government would not directly interfere with decisions taken by the legislatures of the Overseas Territories. Fellow Foreign Office Minister Harriett Baldwin defended this decision. The Governor then granted the Royal assent on 7 February 2018. The law went into effect on 1 June 2018.

== Legal challenge ==
A legal challenge against the law was filed with the Supreme Court on 16 February 2018. A second challenge against the law was announced on 3 April 2018. A hearing was held on 21 and 22 May 2018 before the Chief Justice of the court.

The court ruled on the matter on 6 June 2018. It held that “maintaining or restoring a definition of marriage that disadvantaged those who believe in same-sex marriage discriminated against them on the grounds of their creed contrary to section 12 of the Bermuda Constitution.” The court agreed to an application by the Attorney-General to stay the ruling by six weeks, to allow the government to consider an appeal. The Minister for Home Affairs has said the government intends to appeal the ruling “subject to any legal advice that we receive”. On 5 July, the Minister of Home Affairs, Walter Roban, confirmed that an appeal had been filed with the Court of Appeal. The court heard oral arguments on 7, 8 and 9 November 2018. On 23 November, the court upheld the Supreme Court's ruling and refused to stay the decision. On 13 December 2018, Roban announced that the government had applied to the Court of Appeal for permission to appeal the ruling to the Judicial Committee of the Privy Council. On 29 May 2019, Roban said that permission to appeal had been granted. The government filed the notice of appeal on 12 July 2019. The appeal was heard on 3 and 4 February 2021. On 14 March 2022, the JCPC allowed the appeal and ruled that the Domestic Partnership Act 2018 is constitutional.

== Effect ==
The Act created domestic partnerships in Bermuda which replaced same-sex marriages. The act also permitted for heterosexual couples to enter into a domestic partnership. Same-sex couples who were married before the act came into force would remain recognised as being married. Implementation was delayed owing to pending marriage licences and ceremonies due to be conducted in Bermuda or on Bermudian-flagged ships. The Act came into force on 1 June 2018.

== 2022 legislation ==
In July 2022, laws were passed within Bermuda to retrospectively backdate same-sex marriage legality formally prior to March 2022.
