= Bermuda Public Services Association =

BPSU
- Bermuda Public Services Union
- Founded: 1952
- Headquarters: Hamilton, Bermuda
- Location: Bermuda
- Affiliations: PSI, UNI
- Website: Bermuda Public Services Association official website

The Bermuda Public Services Union (BPSU) is a trade union in Bermuda. It was founded in 1952 as the Bermuda Civil Service Association, and changed its name in 1971.

The BPSU is affiliated to Public Services International and Union Network International.
