= Law of Bermuda =

The law of Bermuda is based on the common law legal system of England and Wales.

== Sources of law ==
- The law of England and Wales as it stood in 1620 – of all kinds: common law, equity, and statute – became the law of Bermuda at that time, and it remains so to the extent that other sources have not changed it.
- The Parliament of Bermuda enacts statutes on all domestic legal issues.
- Bermuda has a body of delegated legislation.
- Precedents established in Bermuda courts are binding on equal and lower courts.
- Precedents established in the courts of England and Wales have force in Bermuda to the extent that they are "on-point". This is an issue because Bermuda statute law and England and Wales statute law are usually different. A particular example of this has arisen since the implementation of the Woolf reforms in England and Wales in 1998, since they do not apply in Bermuda. The effect has been that case law on Bermuda court procedure, except local case law, has stagnated since that date.

== Immigration ==
The main categories of residents in Bermuda are:

- Bermudian status — Bermuda does not have its own nationality law. Bermudians are British Overseas Territories citizens by default, which is the island's de facto citizenship. Bermudian status can be obtained:
1. By birth — Although it is possible to be born Bermudian, being born in Bermuda does not automatically confer this status. One must be born in Bermuda to a parent who holds Bermudian status to be considered Bermudian by birth.
2. Through residence — A subset of permanent residents, who have been living on the island since 1989, can apply for Bermudian status if they are Commonwealth citizens.
- Spouse of a Bermudian — This status confers many of the rights of a Bermudian (free access to the job market, for example) but does not itself bring status rights. People with this status eventually become Bermudian in their own right after ten years. However, the status is lost if the marriage itself breaks down.
- Permanent resident — Immigration law reform in 1998 severely restricted the ability of new persons to come to Bermuda and obtain Bermudian status. Persons without status residing on the island since 1989 became eligible for permanent residence certificates, which allowed them to stay and work on the island indefinitely, but without the right to vote, without the right to own local businesses, and subject to a high landowning tax. Their spouses and relatives remain eligible to obtain permanent residence certificates. Such people are known locally as "PRCs".
- Guest worker — Persons with work permits may work and reside on the island with their spouses and minor children for the term of their permit (usually 30 days-5 years, although 10-year permits are possible). Permits are tied to a specific employer and job, and the job generally must be offered to Bermudians, spouses, or PRCs before a work permit is issued. Their spouses and children may not work unless they obtain a work permit. Work permits can be renewed. There is no provision in the law for work permit holders or their families to acquire any permanent residence or citizenship rights over time.
- Property owner — A person who owns property under a license (see property law, below) does not thereby acquire any citizenship rights. However, such people are entitled to reside in Bermuda.

== Company law ==
- Two types of companies can be incorporated in Bermuda:
1. a local company, which is owned 60% or more by Bermudians; and
2. an exempt company, which is owned chiefly by non-Bermudians
- As a matter of broad principle (to which there are many exceptions):
  - only a local company may trade in Bermuda (there is a similar restriction on foreign companies, and on non-Bermudian sole traders and partnerships);
  - only local companies are expected to contribute to the local economy through taxation.
  - exempt companies may have a physical presence in, and employ staff in, Bermuda.

== Property law ==
- All conveyancing in Bermuda is unregistered. Bermuda has no equivalent of the British Law of Property Act 1925.
- Bermuda has no capital gains taxes, but there is ad valorem Stamp Duty on sales and gifts of real estate.
- Generally, Bermuda real estate cannot be vested in a corporation, except:
  - in a trust company;
  - in the management company of a condominium; or
  - in other cases, with the permission of the minister, strictly limited by policy.
- Bermuda real estate cannot be vested in a non-Bermudian, nor in a trust which may benefit a non-Bermudian, unless a license is obtained on behalf of the non-Bermudian. The license fee is a substantial percentage of the real estate's market value.
- With some limited exceptions, only real estate in the hands of non-Bermudians is available for sale to non-Bermudians.
- It is common for Bermuda real estate to be owned by trusts.

== Trust law ==
See also Trust law

- It is illegal to act as a trustee, as a business, without a license. Generally, licenses are only granted to corporations, so almost all professional trustees are trust companies. A professional person may act as a trustee if (and only if) they have a connection with a licensed trust company and delegate certain functions to that trust company.
- Unpaid private trustees are fairly common, although usually only for domestic trusts (see below).
- The residence of a trust follows the residence of its trustees. A trust is therefore only a Bermuda resident if a majority of its trustees are Bermuda residents.
- Generally, Bermuda tax law is generous in its treatment of non-Bermuda assets, which include foreign currencies even where held at Bermuda banks. There is usually no tax charge in Bermuda (for example, to Stamp Duty) on settling non-Bermuda assets into trusts, nor on the income those assets produce, nor on their sale, nor on their distribution to beneficiaries. As with other offshore financial centres ("tax havens"), this has led to the use of Bermuda trusts by settlors and beneficiaries from higher-tax jurisdictions.
- By contrast, Bermuda assets are generally charged to ad valorem Stamp Duty upon being settled into trust.
- Bermuda (by statute) recognises the concept of non-charitable purpose trusts.
- Domestic trusts (that is, trusts settled by Bermudians, with Bermudian beneficiaries) are very common, due to the stamp duty legislation, which imposes a tax of up to 15% of the value of Bermuda assets in an estate on death, but does not tax an interest in a discretionary trust.

== Litigation and the Bermuda court system ==
- Together with some tribunals, Bermuda has a three-tier court system:
1. Magistrates Court, with a mainly criminal jurisdiction;
2. Supreme Court, with a civil and criminal jurisdiction, covers the roles of the English Crown Court, County Court, and High Court. Among others, this includes the Commercial Court.
3. Court of Appeal has equivalent status to the English Court of Appeal. There is a further right of appeal to the Privy Council in London.

== Judicial Officers ==
The current Chief Justice of Bermuda is Larry Mussenden, who was appointed in 2024. For previous Chief Justices, see Chief Justice of Bermuda.
