= Jonathan Shurberg =

American lawyer (1963–2017)

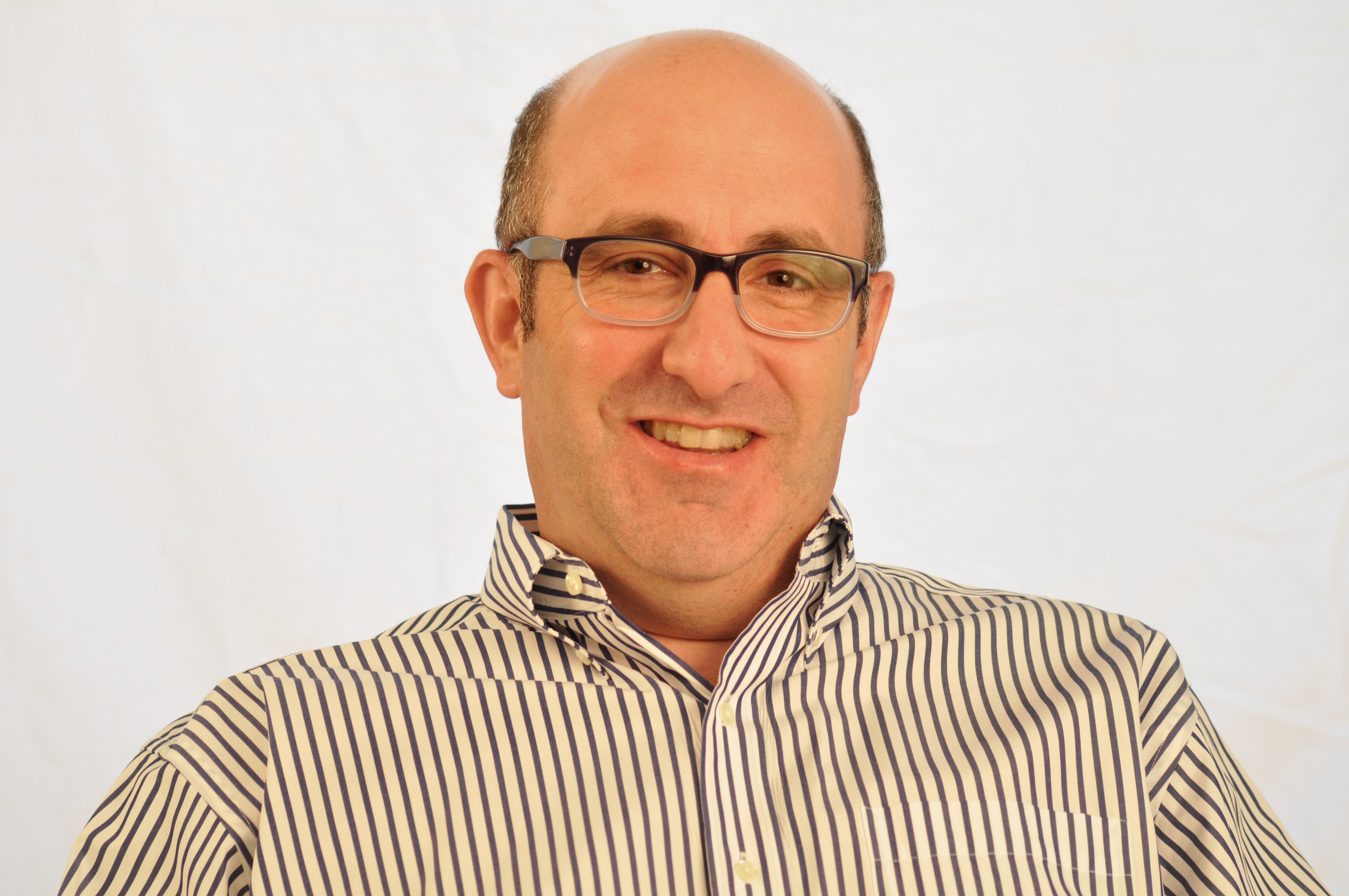
- Shurberg in 2013
- Born: Jonathan Seth Shurberg; March 27, 1963; Philadelphia, Pennsylvania, U.S.
- Died: July 20, 2017 (aged 54); Silver Spring, Maryland, U.S.
- Education: B.A Georgetown University; J.D American University
- Occupations: Trial Lawyer, Politician
- Known for: Candidate for State Delegate, 2014 Maryland Democratic Primary Election
- Spouse: Rebecca Lord (deceased)

Jonathan Seth Shurberg (March 27, 1963 – July 20, 2017) was a Maryland-based American attorney, community advocate, and 2014 Democratic Party candidate for state delegate. He was a practicing lawyer for over twenty years, and was active in Maryland politics from 2002 until his death.

Over the course of his political career, Shurberg fought for the voting rights of minorities and young people, the civil rights of LGBT individuals, and for pro-choice causes. Shurberg served on the board of Planned Parenthood of Metropolitan Washington, D.C Action Fund, and his 2014 campaign for delegate was endorsed by NARAL Maryland Pro-Choice PAC and Planned Parenthood of Metropolitan Washington, D.C. Action Fund, as well as The Gazette.

== Early life ==
Shurberg was born March 27, 1963, in Philadelphia, Pennsylvania, and grew up in Wethersfield, Connecticut. In 1981, after graduating from the Kingswood-Oxford School, he moved to Washington, D.C., to attend Georgetown University. After graduating from Georgetown in 1985 with a degree in International Politics, Shurberg worked as a paralegal for several years before matriculating to the Washington College of Law at American University. At the Washington College of Law, Shurberg met his future wife, Rebecca Lord, with whom he would move to Silver Spring, Maryland, in 1990.

== Legal career ==
In 1991, after graduating summa cum laude from the Washington College of Law, Shurberg began work as a judicial clerk for Judge Rosalyn B. Bell on the Court of Special Appeals of Maryland. After being admitted to the Maryland State Bar in 1992, he spent several years working for private law firms, with a focus on family law, and opened his own practice in 1996. For over twenty-two years, Shurberg has practiced law in Montgomery County, Maryland, and has focused on serving the legal needs of his community.

In 2006, Shurberg represented Congresswoman Donna Edwards in the aftermath of the hotly contested primary election that year. In 2008, when Edwards ran again for the U.S. House of Representatives, he served as both her campaign counsel and chief counsel for election protection efforts, and helped secure her election to the United States House of Representatives. Also in 2006, Shurberg provided pro-bono legal assistance to thirty families facing eviction in the Takoma Park Sligo View Apartment Building. Working in conjunction with Senator Jamie Raskin, Shurberg was able to delay eviction proceedings and allow the tenants to remain in their homes.

In 2008, Shurberg won a significant Court of Appeals decision on behalf of a Bethesda, Maryland teenager and her father, restoring the right of Maryland seventeen-year-olds to vote in the primary elections if they will be of legal voting age by the time of the general election. As a result of Shurberg's work, the franchise was expanded to over 50,000 young Maryland voters. Less than a year after the case, there were over 12,000 17-year-old voters registered to vote in Maryland.

In 2008, Shurberg worked with Equality Maryland to successfully defend Montgomery County citizens against challenges to a gender identity nondiscrimination statute passed earlier in the year. The statute, which would inspire future nondiscrimination ordinances in Baltimore and Howard County, was challenged in the Circuit Court for Montgomery County by anti-equality activists who wanted to force the statute to be subject to a popular vote. Shurberg argued extensively against the validity of the referendum petition, both before the Circuit Court and the Maryland Court of Appeals. The combined efforts of Shurberg and local LGBT organizations, including the National Center for Transgender Equality, the National Gay and Lesbian Task Force, Lambda Legal, and Human Rights Campaign protected the statute, and would set the precedent for the 2014 passage of the Fairness for All Marylanders Act, a law that amended the state's nondiscrimination statute to include gender identity. He received the Distinguished Service Award by Gay Law for his work.

In 2009, Shurberg represented Councilmember Nancy Navarro in the absentee/provisional canvass before the Montgomery County, Maryland Board of Elections in her narrow 2009 special election victory, and again in 2010 before the Federal Election Commission. Later in that year, he also represented Maryland delegates Karen S. Montgomery and Ariana Kelly in the absentee/provisional canvass, following narrow victories in their respective primary elections.

== Civic leadership and political career ==
In 2002, Shurberg began his career in politics, starting at the local level with a dedication to advancing progressive causes in his community. That year, he served as a campaign volunteer and precinct coordinator for the County Council campaign of current U.S Secretary of Labor Tom Perez. Shurberg's early political activism inspired him to become further involved in Montgomery County's political scene, and he became a Highland View Elementary School PTA representative shortly after his involvement with the Perez campaign.

In 2004, Shurberg served as a volunteer election protection attorney for the John Kerry for President campaign, and worked in the battleground state of Ohio.

In 2005, Shurberg and his wife Rebecca began hosting an annual event for the Greater Silver Spring, Maryland Democratic Club, introducing them to a number of aspiring political candidates, including future State Senator Jamie Raskin and 2014 Gubernatorial candidate Heather Mizeur. In 2006, Shurberg served as campaign counsel for Raskin's successful state senate campaign, and the same year, aided Mizeur in her successful bid for a seat in the Maryland House of Delegates. During the 2006 General Election, Shurberg was also active in U.S Senator Ben Cardin's first campaign for U.S Senate.

In January 2013, Shurberg joined the board of Planned Parenthood of Metropolitan Washington, D.C Action fund, the 501(c)4 arm of Planned Parenthood of Metropolitan Washington, accepting the seat previously held by his late wife. As a board member, he has worked to elect pro-choice candidates in Virginia, Maryland, and Washington, D.C., provided pro-bono legal consultation regarding clinic access and buffer zones, and supported Planned Parenthood's mission to ensure access to low-cost, high quality healthcare services for women and men in the D.C Metropolitan area.

Shurberg has been extremely active in community and political organizations over the past twenty years. He was a founding board member, and sits on the steering committee of Progressive Neighbors, a Silver Spring-based political group with a dedication to advancing progressive causes in Montgomery County. He is also Chair of the Legislative Committee for Gender Rights Maryland, an advocacy group focused on aiding "in the advancement, achievement and protection of the civil rights of transpeople through electoral involvement, grassroots organizing, coalition building and direct legislative advocacy." Shurberg is a member of both the Bar Association of Montgomery County (BAMC) and the Maryland State Bar Association.

=== Work in Annapolis ===
Over the past seven years, Shurberg has testified before the Maryland House of Delegates and the Maryland State Senate over issues of importance to his community, with a special focus on voting rights. In 2009, despite several court rulings to the contrary, the State Board of Elections proposed what it characterized as a "technical amendment" to the Election code that would have allowed the Board to permanently remove registered voters from the voter rolls simply because the voter did not respond to a mail notice from the board. Shurberg testified against the bill, HB 1392 (2009) before the Ways and Means Committee, expressing the view that the amendment was entirely unconstitutional. Thanks to his efforts, the bill was referred back to the election law subcommittee, the unconstitutional provisions were removed, and hundreds of thousands of Maryland voters were saved from potential disenfranchisement.

Since 2007, Shurberg has served on multiple legislative committees with a wide variety of legislators and activists, working on issues pertaining to same-sex marriage and gender identity nondiscrimination legislation. He has forged solid relationships with members of the Montgomery County delegation, as well as members of the General Assembly from around the state.

=== 2014 delegate race ===
In 2014, after state delegates Tom Hucker and Heather Mizeur announced that they would not be seeking re-election, Shurberg announced his candidacy for one of the District 20's three delegate seats. He was endorsed by Planned Parenthood of Metropolitan Washington Action Fund, NARAL Pro-Choice Maryland PAC, MC NOW PAC, and The Gazette. In April, The Gazette wrote that Shurberg and the other endorsees "built reputations of substantive achievement, and offer the best potential for effective state representation"

=== Maryland Scramble ===
Logo for Maryland Scramble

In March 2015, shortly after Senator Barbara Mikulski announced that she would not be seeking re-election to the United States Senate, Shurberg created Maryland Scramble, a political blog with a special focus on Maryland politics.

== Personal life ==
Shurberg resided in Silver Spring, Maryland, with his family. He has two sons, Eli (born 1994) and Ethan (born 2000). His wife, Rebecca Lord, died in 2012 after a battle with thyroid cancer. Despite her illness, Lord was active in local politics, earned a PhD in Latin American history at the University of Maryland, and sat on the board of Planned Parenthood of Metropolitan Washington, D.C Action Fund (PPMWAF).
