= 2012 Maryland Question 6 =

Referendum on same-sex marriage

Referendum Question 6
- November 6, 2012
- Civil Marriage Protection Act

Results
Choice	Votes	%
Yes	1,373,504	52.43%
No	1,246,045	47.57%
Valid votes	2,619,549	95.81%
Invalid or blank votes	114,627	4.19%
Total votes	2,734,176	100.00%

Yes
90–100%
80–90%
70–80%
60–70%
50–60%
No
90–100%
80–90%
70–80%
60–70%
50–60%

Question 6 (colloquially called the Maryland same-sex marriage referendum) is a referendum that appeared on the general election ballot for the U.S. state of Maryland to allow voters to approve or reject the Civil Marriage Protection Act—a bill legalizing same-sex marriage passed by the General Assembly in 2012. The referendum was approved by 52.4% of voters on November 6, 2012, and thereafter went into effect on January 1, 2013.

== Ballot measure ==
The ballot measure read as follows:

Question 6
Civil Marriage Protection Act

Establishes that Maryland's civil marriage laws allow gay and lesbian couples to obtain a civil marriage license, provided they are not otherwise prohibited from marrying; protects clergy from having to perform any particular marriage ceremony in violation of their religious beliefs; affirms that each religious faith has exclusive control over its own theological doctrine regarding who may marry within that faith; and provides that religious organizations and certain related entities are not required to provide goods, services, or benefits to an individual related to the celebration or promotion of marriage in violation of their religious beliefs.

The choices read as follows:

For the Referred Law
Against the Referred Law

== History ==
The Civil Marriage Protection Act was passed by the Maryland General Assembly in February 2012 and signed on March 1, 2012, by Governor Martin O'Malley. The Maryland House of Delegates approved the bill by a 72–67 vote, and the Maryland Senate approved the bill by a vote of 25–22. Sections 2, 3 and 4 of the bill were included to ensure that religious leaders, religiously controlled institutions, and their programs are legally protected from being required to officiate or provide facilities for a same-sex marriage or couple if they refuse.

Opponents of same-sex marriage announced the launch of the petition drive for the referendum two weeks later. "The General Assembly and the governor do not have the final word on marriage in Maryland," said Derek McCoy, executive director of Maryland Marriage Alliance. "The people do." Petitioners submitted more than twice the number of required signatures to place the referendum on the election ballot, and in June, the State Board of Elections announced that enough were validated.

== Support and opposition ==
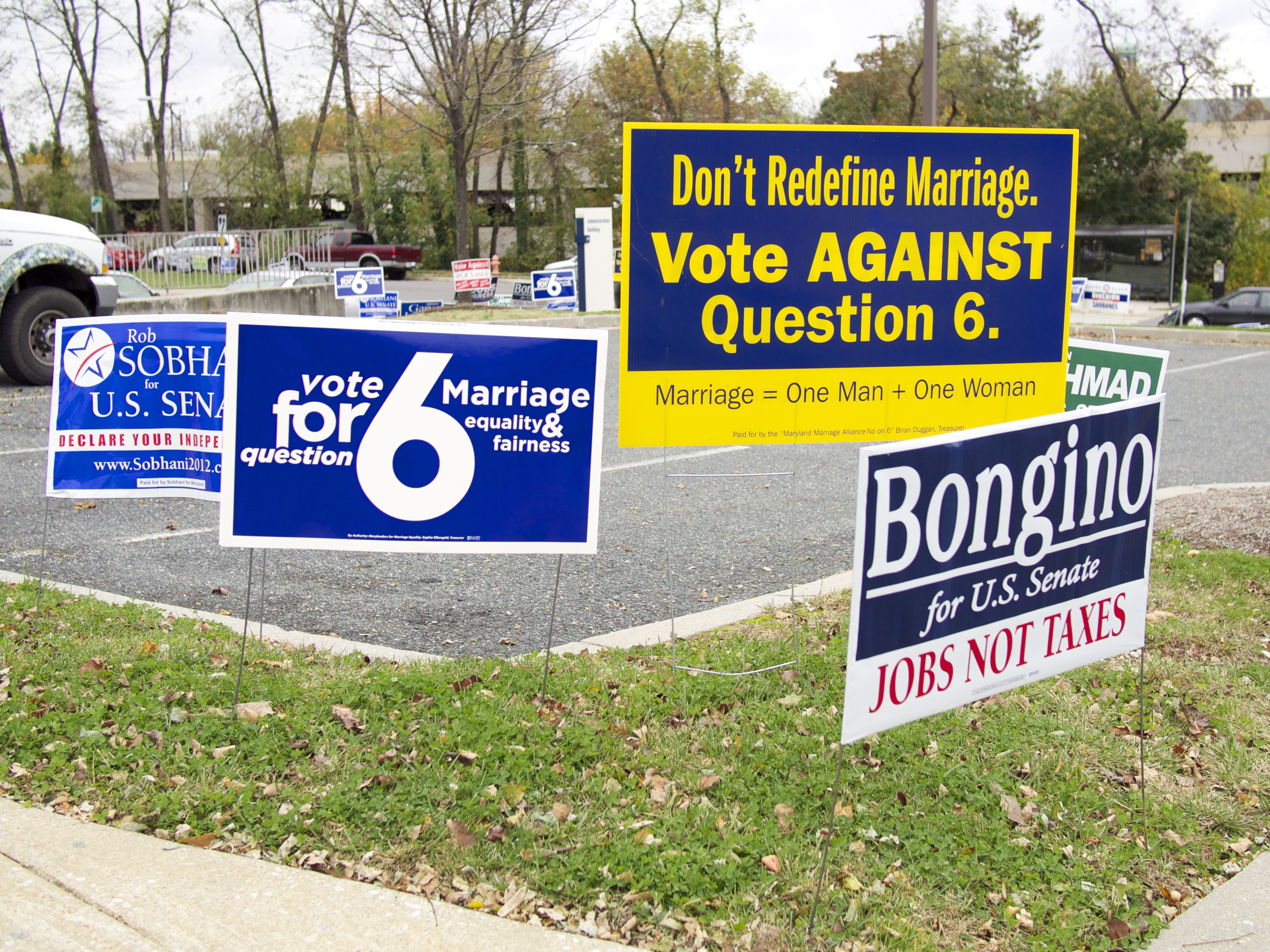
Campaign signs outside of a polling place in Towson, Maryland. November 2012.

Support for Question 6 consisted of a coalition of civil rights leaders, clergy, businesses, partners, and politicians known as Marylanders for Marriage Equality. The opposition to Question 6 consisted of religious figures and politicians known as the Maryland Marriage Alliance.

Governor Martin O'Malley, a Catholic, led the 2012 campaign for same-sex marriage in Maryland. O'Malley said he concluded that "discriminating against individuals based on their sexual orientation in the context of civil marital rights is unjust" and "treating the children of families headed by same-sex couples with lesser protections under the law than the children of families headed by heterosexual parents, is also unjust."

Arguments supporting Question 6 included protecting the children of gay and lesbian couples by affording their parents equal rights under the law, improving quality of life, principles of fairness, civil equality, and highlighting religious protections. Arguments in opposition to Question 6 included protecting children from being taught same-sex marriage in public schools with a focus on "boys can marry boys", preserving parental rights, a traditional definition of marriage as between one man and one woman, and protecting religious beliefs. An official at Gallaudet University, Angela McCaskill, used as an example of religious persecution in a political ad opposing same-sex marriage, opted to have herself removed because it was misleading. McCaskill, who was fired after the university learned that she signed the petition in opposition of Question 6, said she signed solely "because she believed the matter should be voted on." Her personal views on same-sex marriage were unknown. Religious officials, as well as supporters of same-sex marriage rallied for McCaskill and called for her reinstatement, stating that she should not be penalized for her personal views. Several dozen small employers in the state have said that same-sex marriage will be good for business, helping to attract and retain talent.

=== Fundraising ===
Advocates for Question 6 raised a total of approximately $4.1 million: contributions from the organizations and individuals under Marylanders for Marriage Equality (78.5%), Human Rights Campaign's National Marriage Fund and Maryland Families PAC (14.2%), NAACP's National Voter Fund for Question 6 (5.8%), Freedom to Marry's Maryland PAC (0.9%), and Maryland for All Families (0.1%). Opponents of Question 6 raised a total of approximately $1.7 million: contributions from the organizations and individuals under Maryland Marriage Alliance, National Organization for Marriage (75%), and the Knights of Columbus (14.7%).

Notable Supporters

- President Barack Obama
- Former President Bill Clinton
- Former Vice President Dick Cheney
- Terry McAuliffe, former chairman of the DNC
- Ken Mehlman, former chairman of the RNC
- Julian Bond, former chairman of the NAACP,
  civil rights activist
- Al Sharpton, civil rights activist
- Delman Coates of Mount Ennon Baptist Church
- Donte Hickman Sr. of Southern Baptist Church
- Brendon Ayanbadejo, linebacker for the Baltimore Ravens
- 1119SEIU
- AFL–CIO
- Equality Maryland
- Human Rights Campaign
- ACLU of Maryland
- Maryland State Education Association
- NAACP of Baltimore
- PayPal
- Calvert Investments
- Nike, Inc.
- Nordstrom

Notable Opponents

- Edwin Frederick O'Brien, former Archbishop of Baltimore
- Derek McCoy of Maryland Marriage Alliance
- Tony Perkins of Family Research Council
- Harry R. Jackson, Jr. of Hope Christian Church
- Brian Brown of National Organization for Marriage
- Delegate Don Dwyer
- Delegate Emmett C. Burns, Jr.

== Opinion polls ==
Public opinion surveys have reported those in favor of same-sex marriage and those opposed.

Date of opinion poll	Conducted by	Sample size	In favor	Opposed	Undecided	Margin of Error
January 9–15, 2012	Gonzales Research & Marketing Strategies	808	49%	47%	4%	±3.5%
January 23–26, 2012	The Washington Post	1,064	50%	44%	6%	±3.5%
March 5–7, 2012	Public Policy Polling	600	52%	44%	4%	±3.5%
March 16–19, 2012	OpinionWorks	601	40%	43%	16%	±4%
May 14–21, 2012	Public Policy Polling	852	57%	37%	6%	±3.5%
July 24–28, 2012	Hart Research Associates	504	54%	40%	6%	±4.5%
September 17–23, 2012	Gonzales Research & Marketing Strategies	813	51%	43%	6%	±3.5%
September 25–27, 2012	OpinionWorks	804	49%	39%	12%	±3.5%
October 11–15, 2012	The Washington Post	843	52%	43%	5%	±4%
October 20–23, 2012	OpinionWorks	801	46%	47%	6%	±3.5%
October 21–25, 2012	Sarah T. Hughes Field Politics Center at Goucher College	667	55.4%	39.2%	5.4%	±3.79%

== Results ==
On November 6, 2012, the measure was approved by 52.4% of voters. In a statement regarding the election results, Governor Martin O'Malley said "Whether your parents happen to be gay or straight, Democratic, Republican or Independent, your families are equal before the eyes of the law." The leading opposition group said that "No matter how it turns out, there have been thousands of people who are engaged in the process." On November 29, 2012, Attorney General Doug Gansler issued a legal opinion stating that court clerks could begin issuing marriage licenses to same-sex couples once the governor certified the election results on December 6, 2012, though they would not become effective until January 1, 2013. 21 out of the 24 counties in Maryland chose to issue the licenses ahead of schedule.

An exit poll conducted by AP and Edison Research found:

- 7 in 10 young voters, age 29 and under, voted in favor of same-sex marriage.
- Almost 6 in 10 of those age 30 to 44 voted in favor of same-sex marriage.
- Nearly two-thirds of women with children voted in favor of same sex marriage.
- Those over age 45 slightly voted against same-sex marriage.
- Nearly two-thirds of those age 65 and older voted against same-sex marriage.

=== County breakdown ===
Breakdown of voting by county
County	Yes	Votes	No	Votes
Montgomery	65.8%	289,625	34.2%	150,498
Howard	59.2%	88,768	40.8%	61,139
Baltimore City	57.2%	138,007	42.8%	103,294
Anne Arundel	52.4%	133,053	47.6%	120,883
Baltimore County	51.7%	194,150	48.3%	181,162
Frederick	51%	58,349	49%	55,952
Prince George's	49.6%	183,257	50.4%	186,296
Kent	49.1%	4,685	50.9%	4,856
Talbot	48.2%	9,567	51.8%	10,290
Calvert	45.8%	20,205	54.2%	23,944
Charles	45.6%	33,334	54.4%	39,792
Harford	44.5%	55,057	55.5%	68,785
Cecil	44.3%	18,279	55.7%	22,993
Queen Anne's	44.2%	10,788	55.8%	13,609
Saint Mary's	44.2%	20,606	55.8%	25,971
Carroll	43.8%	37,631	56.2%	48,253
Worcester	42.2%	11,096	57.8%	15,212
Wicomico	39.8%	16,107	60.2%	24,405
Washington	38.8%	23,585	61.2%	37,246
Dorchester	38.7%	5,645	61.3%	8,943
Caroline	37%	4,785	63%	8,139
Somerset	35.7%	3,467	64.3%	6,244
Allegany	34.5%	9,965	65.5%	18,927
Garrett	27.5%	3,493	72.5%	9,212

== See also ==
- LGBT rights in Maryland
- 2012 Minnesota Amendment 1
- Same-sex marriage in the United States

=== Other same-sex marriage referendums ===
- Australian Marriage Law Postal Survey, 2017
- 2016 Bermudian same-sex union and marriage referendum
- 2013 Croatian constitutional referendum
- Irish same-sex marriage referendum, 2015
- 2015 Slovak same-sex marriage referendum
- 2015 Slovenian same-sex marriage referendum
- United States:
  - Maine:
    - 2009 Maine same-sex marriage referendum
    - 2012 Maine same-sex marriage referendum
  - 2012 Washington same-sex marriage referendum
