= Same-sex marriage in Maryland =

Same-sex marriage has been legally recognized in Maryland since January 1, 2013. In 2012, the state's Democratic representatives, led by Governor Martin O'Malley, began a campaign for its legalization. After much debate, a law permitting same-sex marriage was passed by the General Assembly (Maryland's bicameral legislature, composed of the Senate and the House of Delegates) in February 2012 and signed on March 1, 2012. The law took effect on January 1, 2013 after 52.4% of voters approved a statewide referendum held on November 6, 2012. The vote was hailed as a watershed moment by gay rights activists and marked the first time marriage rights in the United States had been extended to same-sex couples by popular vote. Maryland was the ninth U.S. state to legalize same-sex marriage. (Note: After Massachusetts, Connecticut, Iowa, Vermont, New Hampshire, New York, Washington, and Maine, but excluding California which had constitutionally banned same-sex marriage in November 2008, but still recognized marriages performed between June and November 2008.)

Upon the rise of the same-sex marriage movement in the early 1970s, Maryland established the first law in the United States that expressly defined marriage to be "a union between a man and a woman". Attempts to both ban and legalize same-sex marriage in the 1990s and 2000s failed to gain enough support from central committees of the General Assembly. Roman Catholic authorities throughout the state were adamantly opposed to the legalization of same-sex marriage, saying it deeply conflicted with the best interests of society, and would threaten religious liberty. The debates produced disputes between individuals who had been traditionally aligned on causes and prompted sharp criticism from African-American religious leaders who said same-sex marriage would "disrupt the fabric of the culture".

Before passage of the Civil Marriage Protection Act, the state recognized same-sex marriages performed in other jurisdictions following the 2010 release of a legal opinion from Attorney General Doug Gansler in his nine-month analysis of comity laws. In 2012, the Maryland Court of Appeals maintained Gansler's analysis. It issued a unanimous decision in Port v. Cowan finding that a same-sex marriage performed out-of-state must be considered equal and valid under state law, despite its earlier decision in Conaway v. Deane & Polyak in 2007, in which the court upheld the statutory ban on same-sex marriage as constitutional.

== Domestic partnerships ==
While early efforts to legalize same-sex marriage failed, the Maryland General Assembly approved two laws in 2008 that grant all unmarried couples certain domestic partnership rights, including the ability to make hospital and nursing home visits, end-of-life choices and other medical decisions, as well as rights to joint property ownership. Domestic partners must be at least 18 years old and be able to provide an affidavit attesting to their relationships, along with two documents, such as joint checking accounts, mortgages or car leases, coverage on health insurance policies or designation as primary beneficiaries in a will. The laws went into effect on July 1, 2008.

== Same-sex marriage ==
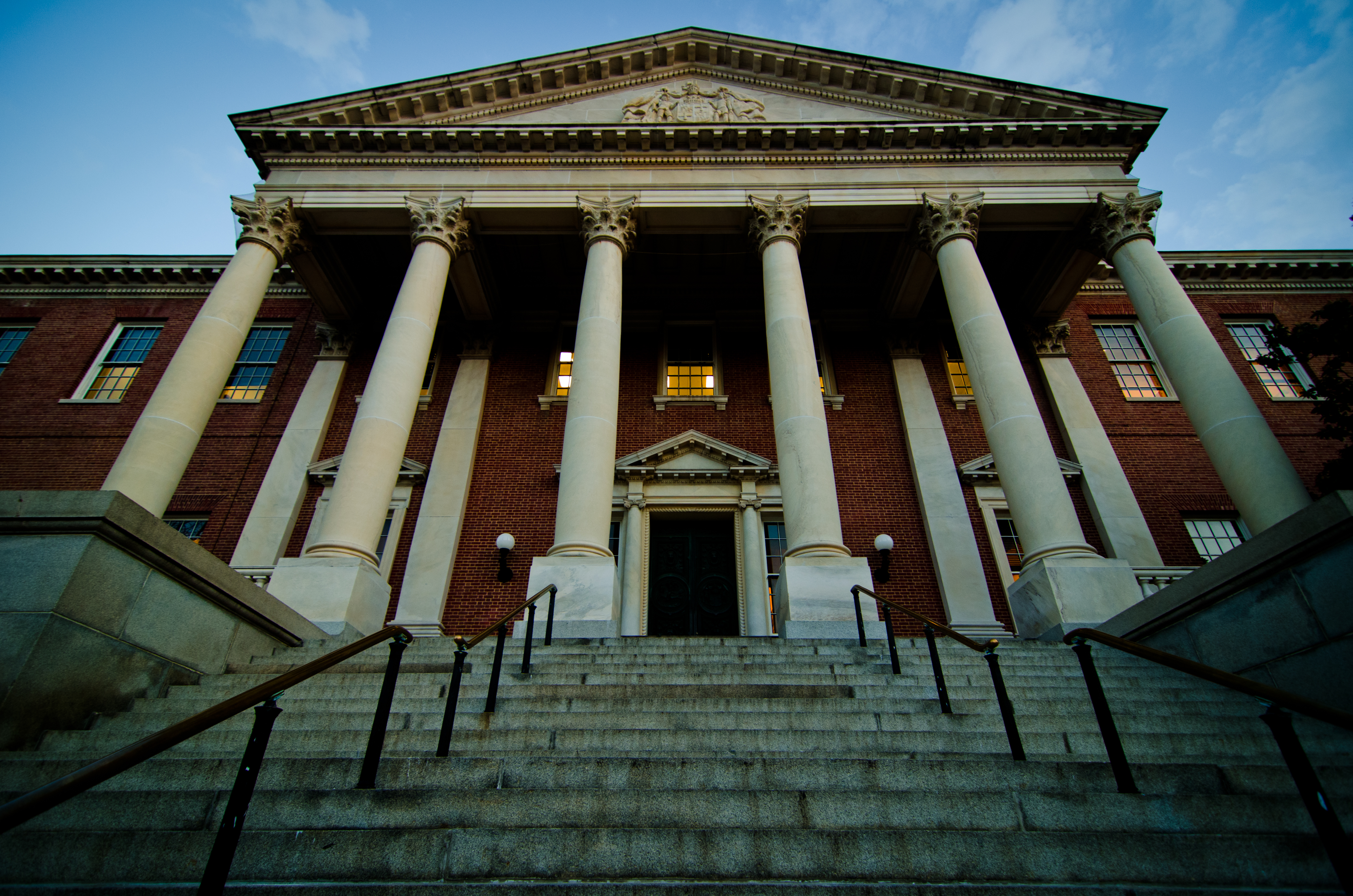
The Maryland State House, the meeting place of the Maryland General Assembly in Annapolis

=== Background ===
Maryland holds a unique place in the history of same-sex marriage in the United States. In 1973, it became the first U.S. state in the nation to define marriage as "a union between a man and a woman", expressly banning same-sex marriage. The Maryland General Assembly passed the law a short time after voters in the state ratified Article 46 of the Maryland Declaration of Rights, commonly referred to as the Equal Rights Amendment (ERA), in November 1972. The constitutional provision prohibited discrimination in equality of rights on the basis of sex. In 1975, a marriage license was issued to two women, Michele Bernadette Bush and Paulette Camille Hill, in Montgomery County. Although the county clerk had issued the license and Attorney General Francis B. Burch had published an opinion that county officials could not challenge the validity of the marriage, the license was later revoked.

During the 1990s, attempts to both ban and legalize same-sex marriage did not pass through the General Assembly. After a committee in the Maryland House of Delegates voted in March 2004 to reject a pair of marriage bills that would have submitted a constitutional amendment against same-sex marriage to voters and invalidated same-sex marriages performed in other states or foreign countries, the American Civil Liberties Union (ACLU) and Equality Maryland filed a lawsuit, Deane & Polyak v. Conaway, to challenge the existing law on behalf of nine same-sex couples and one bereaved man whose partner had died. The lead plaintiffs, from whom the case received its name, were Gita Deane, a learning specialist at Goucher College, and her partner Lisa Polyak, an environmental engineer for the U.S. Army Medical Department. The plaintiffs had applied for marriage licenses in several different counties but were denied by county clerks. In their complaint, the plaintiffs argued that the state's statutory ban on same-sex marriage violated constitutional protections of due process, equality, and prohibition against sex discrimination in Articles 24 and 46 of the Maryland Declaration of Rights. In January 2006, Baltimore Circuit Court Judge M. Brooke Murdock granted summary judgment to the plaintiffs, writing that "Family law §2-201 violates Article 46 of the Maryland Declaration of Rights because it discriminates, based on gender against a suspect class, and is not narrowly tailored to serve any compelling governmental interests." She added that "tradition and social values alone cannot support adequately a discriminatory statutory classification", because "when tradition is the guise under which prejudice or animosity hides, it is not a legitimate state interest." The judge immediately stayed the decision pending an appeal by the Attorney General of Maryland, J. Joseph Curran Jr., which occurred later that day.

While the decision was favored by the plaintiffs, gay rights groups and their supporters, including more than 100 religious leaders and child welfare advocates across the state who had filed amicus briefs, other local religious leaders and evangelical ministers were upset by the decision and looked to state legislators to propose a constitutional ban on same-sex marriage. Such an amendment was favored by Governor Bob Ehrlich who said "my politics on this are very clear. We're going to protect marriage. Traditional marriage." In February 2006, the proposed ban was rejected after opponents successfully amended it to legalize civil unions. Consequently, Delegate Don Dwyer introduced a resolution to impeach Judge Murdock in 2006, alleging "misbehavior in office, [willful] neglect of duty, and incompetency" for her trial court decision. In 2007, he introduced a law that would have banned discussion of same-sex unions in public schools. One lawmaker said "It is a clear attempt to intimidate judges and to make the judiciary subservient to the legislature", and Michael Conroy, former president of the Maryland State Bar Association, said that "No basis in fact or law exists to support any suggestion to impeach Murdock for her recent decision on same-sex marriage." David Rocah, an attorney for the ACLU, called the resolution "a frivolous, dangerous and extremist response from the lunatic fringe." Both measures failed to pass through committee.

=== Conaway case ===
The Court of Appeals, Maryland's highest court, agreed to hear the state's appeal in 2006, bypassing the intermediate court. To the surprise of spectators, there were almost no questions from the judges during oral argument, which took place on December 4, 2006, causing speculation that the court may have taken the appeal just to reverse the Circuit Court ruling. On September 18, 2007, the court issued its decision in Conaway v. Deane & Polyak, overturning the trial court ruling in a 4–3 decision, and holding that the statutory ban on same-sex marriage did not violate the Maryland Constitution. Judge Glenn T. Harrell, Jr. wrote that, because the statute equally barred both men and women from marrying partners of the same sex, it was not discriminatory on the basis of sex and thus did not violate the Equal Rights Amendment as plaintiffs had argued. Judge Harrell said that the ERA was intended to prohibit sex discrimination against women and did not apply to this case, which he said was a matter of sexual orientation. Judge Lynne A. Battaglia wrote a dissenting opinion stating that the statutes and ordinances in Maryland barring discrimination based on sexual orientation, in addition to the state's lack of prohibition on adoption by same-sex couples and its recognition of same-sex couples as co-parents, supported the argument that denying committed same-sex couples the full benefits and privileges of marriage was not related to any rational government interest. Judge Battaglia said she would have remanded the case to circuit court for a full trial in order to settle what she deemed a central factual issue: whether the state could demonstrate that it had "broad societal interest" in retaining marriage to mixed-sex spouses. The dissenting opinion from Chief Judge Robert M. Bell faulted the majority for not recognizing gay people as a suspect class in need of protection from discrimination. He dismissed the majority view that gays and lesbians are politically empowered and should not be viewed as constituting such a class.

Evan Wolfson, founder of Freedom to Marry, said that the decision was "deeply flawed" because the 4–3 majority did not answer the question of how denying marriage to same-sex couples affected the ability of heterosexual couples to procreate. President of the Human Rights Campaign, Joe Solmonese, called the decision a "setback" and Ken Choe, the ACLU attorney who argued on behalf of the plaintiffs, expressed hope that, unlike the majority of the bench, the General Assembly would be able to see "that lesbian and gay couples form committed relationships and loving families just like heterosexual couples":

We're hopeful that, unlike the court, the legislature will see that lesbian and gay Marylanders shouldn't be barred from the hundreds of important protections that come with marriage simply because the person whom they love is a person of the same sex.

=== Recognition of out-of-state marriages ===
Same-sex marriage in the United States

State Senator Richard Madaleno requested in 2009 that Attorney General Doug Gansler answer the question of whether same-sex marriages could be recognized by the state. In February 2010, Gansler issued an opinion after a nine-month analysis of state laws, stating that valid same-sex marriages performed in states that permit same-sex marriage could be recognized under Maryland law. Gansler stated that the opinion was not binding on the courts, and state agencies could begin immediately recognizing out-of-state same-sex marriages. He said he expected the opinion to be quickly challenged in court. The opinion garnered negative reactions from some Republicans, socially conservative Democrats, and several African-American lawmakers, including delegates Emmett C. Burns, Jr. and Don Dwyer, who spoke out against the opinion and promised to initiate impeachment proceedings against Gansler. "It is not up to the attorney general, and that's the reason I will be bringing charges of impeachment," Dwyer said in a statement where he described the Attorney General as usurping the law. The Roman Catholic archbishops of Washington and Baltimore and the Bishop of Wilmington also took "strong exception" to the decision.

Recognition of same-sex marriages from other states became precedent when the Court of Appeals ruled in a case from Prince George's County in May 2012. The couple, two women who had legally married in California, had been denied a divorce by the Prince George's County Circuit Court. On May 18, 2012, the Court of Appeals published a unanimous ruling in Port v. Cowan that validated the marriage of Jessica Port and Virginia Cowan, because it said "no viable decision by the Court had deemed a valid foreign marriage to be 'repugnant'" even if the marriage was void were it performed in Maryland. The opinion cited conflicts that arose from decisions in Anne Arundel and St. Mary's counties where two same-sex couples had their petitions for divorce granted, and another case in Baltimore where it was denied. The decision of the court was based on the state's traditional use of the common law doctrine of comity, which specifies that Maryland "will give effect to laws and judicial decisions of another state or jurisdiction, not as a matter of obligation but out of deference and respect."

=== Passage of legislation in 2012 ===
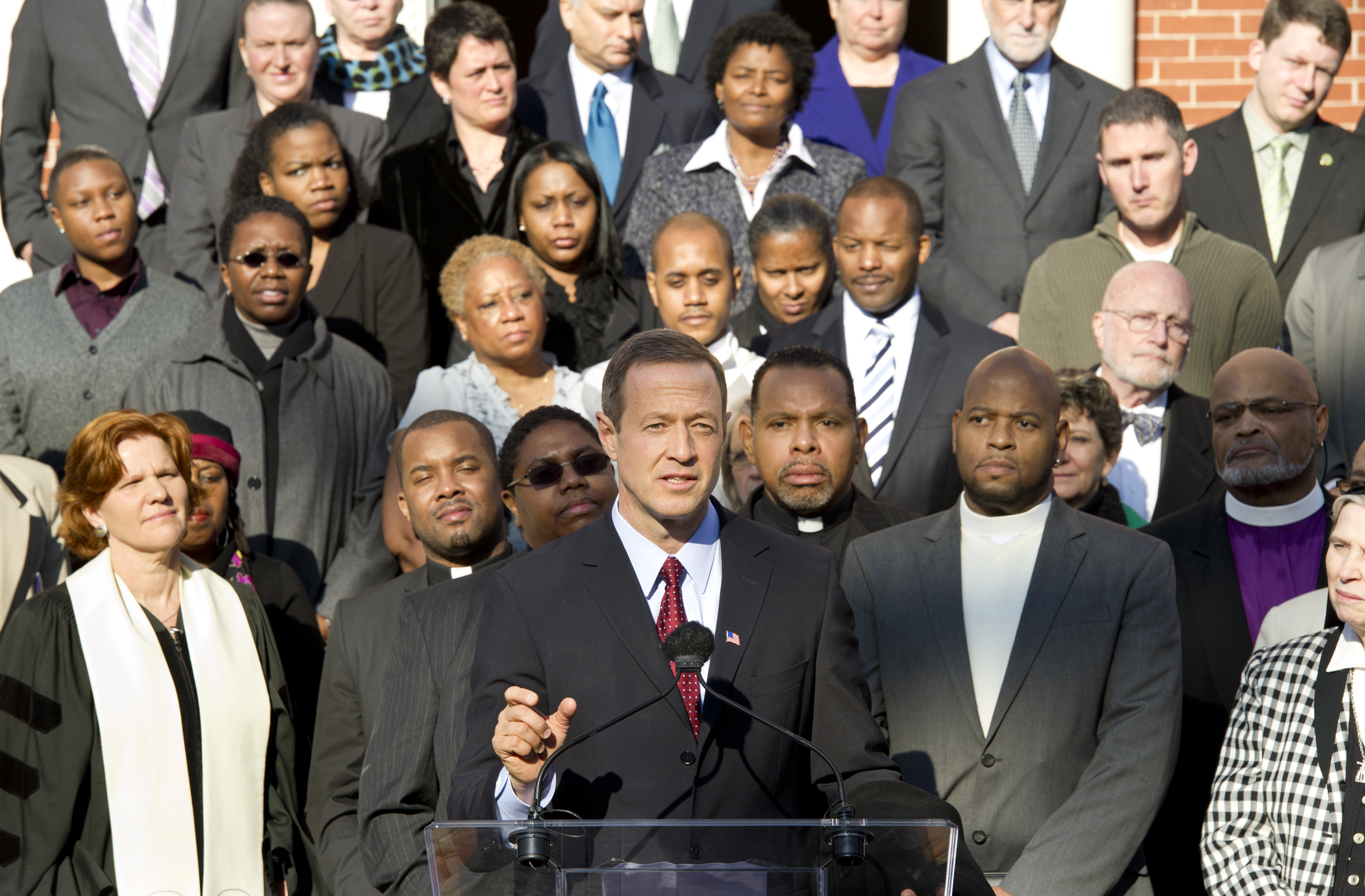
Governor Martin O'Malley with supporters at a Marriage Equality Press Conference in Annapolis, 2012

After the Court of Appeals upheld the statutory ban on same-sex marriage in 2007, State Senator Gwendolyn Britt of Landover Hills, along with delegates Victor R. Ramirez and Ben Barnes, sought to sponsor a marriage bill in the General Assembly. On January 12, 2008, Britt died of heart failure. The executive director of Equality Maryland, Dan Furmansky, who had originally approached Britt to sponsor the legislation, said her death was a "devastating loss, but civil rights struggles are greater than any one person, and as our fight for equality in Maryland continues, her spirit will be with us." On January 25, 2008, the Religious Freedom and Civil Marriage Protection Act was introduced to the House of Delegates. The Senate version of the bill was introduced by senators Richard Madaleno and Jamie Raskin the same day. Advocates held a rally in support of the bill on February 11, 2008, but it ultimately failed in committee, alongside a constitutional ban introduced by Don Dwyer.

The General Assembly first considered the Civil Marriage Protection Act in 2011. Governor Martin O'Malley stated that he would sign the bill, despite urges from Archbishop of Baltimore Edwin Frederick O'Brien requesting that he "resist pressure to do so". O'Malley said "I have concluded that discriminating against individuals based on their sexual orientation in the context of civil marital rights is unjust. I have also concluded that treating the children of families headed by same-sex couples with lesser protections under the law than the children of families headed by heterosexual parents, is also unjust." On February 24, 2011, the Senate, which was thought to be the biggest obstacle to passage, approved the bill in a 25–21 vote. The House of Delegates proved to be a challenge, where same-sex marriage advocates struggled to gain support from social conservatives from Prince George's County, southern Maryland and the Baltimore suburbs, who cited religious concerns.

The debate highlighted disagreements between openly gay lawmakers and some black lawmakers on whether same-sex marriage was a matter of civil rights. Delegate Emmett C. Burns, Jr. said: "If you want to compare same-sex marriage to civil rights as I know it, show me the Ku Klux Klan that invaded your home." Delegate Keiffer J. Mitchell, Jr., grandson of NAACP chief lobbyist Clarence M. Mitchell, Jr., said "It is a civil rights issue when we as a state and a government deny equal protection under the law." Several delegates who originally co-sponsored the bill began to express doubts after being lobbied by church-going constituents, including Sam Arora, and Tiffany Alston, who delayed the bill's vote in the House committee by skipping the voting session. The bill passed through the committee after its chairman, who rarely votes in committee, voted in favor. The House majority whip opposed the bill. Despite pleas from gay lawmakers, the House of Delegates voted to send the bill back to committee on March 11, 2011 and would not reconsider it before January 2012.

The Civil Marriage Protection Act was reintroduced to the General Assembly on January 23, 2012. The new version of the bill contained provisions that more explicitly protects religious leaders, institutions, and their programs from legal action if they refuse to officiate or provide facilities for a same-sex marriage or couple as a matter of their doctrine. During the legislative process, several high-profile political figures attempted to persuade legislators to vote in favor of the bill, including former President Bill Clinton, former Vice President Dick Cheney, Terry McAuliffe, and Ken Mehlman. The House of Delegates passed the bill with a 72–67 vote on February 17, and the Senate passed with a 25–22 vote on February 23. To secure support from some lawmakers who desired to submit the law to a public referendum, the bill was amended to take effect on January 1, 2013.

February 17, 2012 vote in the House of Delegates
Political affiliation	Voted for	Voted against	Absent (Did not vote)
Democratic Party	70: Tiffany T. Alston; Curt Anderson; Charles E. Barkley; Ben Barnes; Kumar Barve; Pamela Beidle; Elizabeth Bobo; John L. Bohanan Jr.; Eric M. Bromwell; Michael E. Busch; Jon Cardin; Alfred C. Carr Jr.; Jill P. Carter; Galen R. Clagett; Luke Clippinger; Frank M. Conaway Jr.; Bonnie Cullison; Kathleen Dumais; Brian Feldman; William Frick; Barbara A. Frush; Tawanna P. Gaines; James W. Gilchrist; Ana Sol Gutierrez; Guy Guzzone; Peter A. Hammen; Hattie N. Harrison; Keith E. Haynes; Anne Healey; Sheila E. Hixson; Marvin E. Holmes Jr.; James W. Hubbard; Tom Hucker; Jolene Ivey; Adrienne A. Jones; Anne Kaiser; Ariana Kelly; Benjamin F. Kramer; Stephen W. Lafferty; Susan C. Lee; Mary Ann Love; Eric Luedtke; James E. Malone Jr.; Brian K. McHale; Maggie McIntosh; Aruna Miller; Keiffer Mitchell Jr.; Heather Mizeur; Dan K. Morhaim; Peter Murphy; Shirley Nathan-Pulliam; Doyle Niemann; Nathaniel T. Oaks; Johnny Olszewski; Joseline Peña-Melnyk; Shane Pendergrass; Kirill Reznik; Barbara A. Robinson; Shane Robinson; Samuel I. Rosenberg; Justin Ross; Luiz R. S. Simmons; Dana Stein; Michael G. Summers; Shawn Z. Tarrant; Frank S. Turner; Kris Valderrama; Jeff Waldstreicher; Mary L. Washington; Craig Zucker	26: Sam Arora; Talmadge Branch; Aisha Braveboy; Emmett C. Burns Jr.; Rudolph C. Cane; Norman Conway; Dereck E. Davis; Steven J. DeBoy Sr.; John P. Donoghue; Cheryl Glenn; Melony G. Griffith; Carolyn J. B. Howard; Mary-Dulany James; Sally Y. Jameson; Kevin Kelly; Joseph J. Minnick; James E. Proctor Jr.; Theodore J. Sophocleus; Melvin L. Stukes; Geraldine Valentino-Smith; Joseph F. Vallario Jr.; Michael L. Vaughn; Jay Walker; Michael H. Weir Jr.; C. T. Wilson; John F. Wood Jr.	2: David D. Rudolph; Veronica L. Turner
Republican Party	2: Robert A. Costa; Wade Kach	41: Kathy Afzali; Susan L. M. Aumann; Gail H. Bates; Wendell Beitzel; Joseph C. Boteler III; John W. E. Cluster Jr.; Don H. Dwyer Jr.; Adelaide C. Eckardt; Donald B. Elliott; Mark N. Fisher; William J. Frank; Ron George; Glen Glass; Jeannie Haddaway-Riccio; Steve Hershey; Patrick N. Hogan; Michael Hough; Richard Impallaria; Jay Jacobs; Nic Kipke; Susan W. Krebs; Susan K. McComas; Tony McConkey; Mike McDermott; Pat McDonough; Herbert H. McMillan; Warren E. Miller; LeRoy E. Myers Jr.; H. Wayne Norman Jr.; Tony O'Donnell; Charles J. Otto; Neil Parrott; Justin Ready; Steve Schuh; Kelly M. Schulz; Andrew A. Serafini; Michael D. Smigiel Sr.; Donna Stifler; Nancy R. Stocksdale; Kathy Szeliga; Cathy Vitale	–
Total	72	67	2
Total	51.1%	47.5%	1.4%

February 23, 2012 vote in the Senate
Political affiliation	Voted for	Voted against	Absent (Did not vote)
Democratic Party	24: James Brochin; Joan Carter Conway; Bill Ferguson; Jennie M. Forehand; Brian Frosh; Robert J. Garagiola; Lisa Gladden; Verna L. Jones; Edward J. Kasemeyer; Delores G. Kelley; Nancy J. King; Kathy Klausmeier; Richard Madaleno; Roger Manno; Nathaniel J. McFadden; Karen S. Montgomery; Paul G. Pinsky; Catherine Pugh; Victor R. Ramirez; Jamie Raskin; James N. Robey; James Rosapepe; Ronald N. Young; Robert Zirkin	11: John Astle; Joanne C. Benson; Ulysses Currie; James E. DeGrange Sr.; Roy Dyson; James N. Mathias Jr.; Thomas M. Middleton; Thomas V. Miller Jr.; C. Anthony Muse; Douglas J. J. Peters; Norman R. Stone Jr.	–
Republican Party	1: Allan H. Kittleman	11: David R. Brinkley; Richard F. Colburn; George C. Edwards; Joseph M. Getty; Barry Glassman; Nancy Jacobs; J. B. Jennings; E. J. Pipkin; Edward R. Reilly; Christopher B. Shank; Bryan Simonaire	–
Total	25	22	0
Total	53.2%	46.8%	0.0%

Results of Question 6 (2012) by county: Yes 60–70% 50–60% / No 70–80% 60–70% 50–60%

Governor O'Malley signed the bill on March 1, 2012. In June 2012, referendum supporters submitted 109,313 valid signatures to the State Secretary, John P. McDonough, more than the 55,736 required for a ballot in Maryland. The language of Question 6 informed voters that the Civil Marriage Protection Act would allow same-sex couples to obtain a civil marriage license, protect clergy from having to perform any particular marriage ceremony in violation of their religious beliefs, and affirm that each religious faith has exclusive control over its own theological doctrine regarding who may marry within that faith. (Note: Voters were asked: "Establishes that Maryland's civil marriage laws allow gay and lesbian couples to obtain a civil marriage license, provided they are not otherwise prohibited from marrying; protects clergy from having to perform any particular marriage ceremony in violation of their religious beliefs; affirms that each religious faith has exclusive control over its own theological doctrine regarding who may marry within that faith; and provides that religious organizations and certain related entities are not required to provide goods, services, or benefits to an individual related to the celebration or promotion of marriage in violation of their religious beliefs. For the Referred Law or Against the Referred Law?") On November 6, 2012, the measure passed with 52.4% of the vote. On November 29, Attorney General Gansler issued a legal opinion that court clerks could accept applications for marriage licenses immediately and issue them on December 6, as long as the effective date on the licenses specified January 1, 2013. 20 out of the 23 counties in Maryland and the city of Baltimore chose to issue the licenses ahead of schedule. Among the first couples to be issued a license were Jessie Weber and Nancy Eddy, who received a marriage license at the Clarence M. Mitchell Jr. Courthouse in Baltimore. "It's important from a legal standpoint, to have the protections of marriage. But even more than that, it's affirming to be recognized by the state. Our ceremony was with our community, our family, our friends, but this feels like being with the entire state. So this is really special", Weber said. The first marriages were solemnized on Tuesday, January 1, 2013. The Mayor of Baltimore, Stephanie Rawlings-Blake, married six couples at Baltimore City Hall that day.

Maryland statutes now state the following:

Only a marriage between two individuals who are not otherwise prohibited from marrying is valid in this State. [MD Fam L Code § 2-201 (2013)]

=== Economic impact ===
A study from the University of California, Los Angeles estimated in 2007 that extending marriage rights to same-sex couples would result in a net gain of approximately $3.2 million each year to the state budget. The study drew on data from the U.S. Census Bureau and Maryland statistical reports. The gain is attributable to savings in expenditures on means-tested public benefit programs and an increase in sales and lodging tax revenue from weddings and wedding-related tourism. Another Williams Institute study conducted in February 2012 estimated that in the first three years of legalization, Maryland same-sex couples would generate between $40 and $64 million for the state economy, in addition to whatever revenue out-of-state couples bring. Several dozen small employers in the state have also said that same-sex marriage would be good for their businesses, helping to attract and retain talent.

=== Demographics and marriage statistics ===
Data from the 2000 U.S. census showed that 11,243 same-sex couples were living in Maryland. By 2005, this had increased to more than 15,600 couples, likely attributed to same-sex couples' growing willingness to disclose their partnerships on government surveys. Same-sex couples lived in all counties of the state and constituted 1.0% of coupled households and 0.6% of all households in the state. Most couples lived in Baltimore, Montgomery County, and Prince George's County. Same-sex partners in Maryland were on average younger than opposite-sex partners, and more likely to be employed. However, the average household income of same-sex couples was lower than different-sex couples, and same-sex couples were also far less likely to own a home than opposite-sex partners. 21% of same-sex couples in Maryland were raising children under the age of 18, with an estimated 5,900 children living in households headed by same-sex couples in 2005.

40,456 marriages were performed in Maryland in 2013, an increase of 23% from the year prior, thought to be largely attributed to the legalization of same-sex marriage on January 1. The state had not recorded such a significant increase in the number of marriages since 1970. The 2020 U.S. census showed that there were 12,969 married same-sex couple households (5,427 male couples and 7,542 female couples) and 8,488 unmarried same-sex couple households in Maryland.

== Public opinion ==
Public opinion for same-sex marriage in Maryland
Poll source	Dates administered	Sample size	Margin of error	Support	Opposition	Do not know / refused
Public Religion Research Institute	February 28 – December 8, 2025	388 adults	?	64%	35%	1%
Public Religion Research Institute	March 13 – December 2, 2024	385 adults	?	70%	29%	1%
Public Religion Research Institute	March 9 – December 7, 2023	375 adults	?	71%	27%	2%
Public Religion Research Institute	March 11 – December 14, 2022	?	?	71%	26%	3%
Public Religion Research Institute	March 8 – November 9, 2021	?	?	75%	25%	>0.5%
Public Religion Research Institute	January 7 – December 20, 2020	1,037 adults	?	68%	29%	3%
Public Religion Research Institute	April 5 – December 23, 2017	1,220 adults	?	66%	25%	9%
Public Religion Research Institute	May 18, 2016 – January 10, 2017	1,727 adults	?	59%	32%	9%
Public Religion Research Institute	April 29, 2015 – January 7, 2016	1,349 adults	?	54%	36%	10%
Public Religion Research Institute	April 2, 2014 – January 4, 2015	975 adults	?	56%	37%	7%
The Washington Post	October 11–15, 2012	1,106 likely voters	± 3.5%	52%	43%	5%
Public Policy Polling	May 14–21, 2012	852 likely voters	± 3.5%	52%	39%	9%
Public Policy Polling	March 5–7, 2012	600 adults	± 3.5%	52%	44%	4%
The Washington Post	January 23–26, 2012	1,064 adults	± 3.5%	50%	44%	6%
Gonzales Research & Marketing Strategies	January 9–15, 2012	808 registered voters	± 3.5%	49%	47%	4%
Gonzales Research & Marketing Strategies	January 13–19, 2011	802 registered voters	± 3.5%	51%	44%	5%
Grove Insight	January 12–16, 2011	700 registered voters	± 3.7%	49%	41%	10%

== See also ==
- Equality Maryland
- Gender Rights Maryland
- LGBT rights in Maryland
- Maryland Question 6
- Public opinion of same-sex marriage in the United States
- Rights and benefits of marriages in the United States
- Same-sex marriage in the United States
- Timeline of same-sex marriage in the United States
