= Maryland Coalition for Trans Equality =

Working to advance equal rights

The Maryland Coalition for Trans Equality (MCTE) is a coalition of organizations and individuals working to advance equal rights for transgender, transsexual, and gender non-conforming people in Maryland. Their stated goal is to achieve this "through shared leadership, decision-making processes, and resources". It is the largest coalition assembled in Maryland whose activities focus on advocacy and education with regard to transgender and gender non-conforming equality issues.

MCTE started on December 8, 2011, when The National Chapter of Parents, Families and Friends of Lesbians and Gays (PFLAG) convened a meeting of Maryland advocates to unite toward passing anti-discrimination protections in Maryland based on an individual's gender identity. During the lead up to the Maryland General Assembly's 90-day 2012 legislative session the coalition member base grew. This included PFLAG National, The Metro DC, Howard county and Baltimore county chapters of PFLAG, Equality Maryland, the National Black Justice Coalition, Baltimore Black Pride, Gender Empowerment Maryland, Pride at Work, TransMaryland, The National Gay and Lesbian Task Force, Gender Rights Maryland, and the American Civil Liberties Union's Maryland affiliate. In 2012 a bill seeking protections based on gender identity was introduced by request of Gender Rights Maryland. The week of its Senate Hearing, Gender Rights Maryland left the coalition, seeking to go it alone in respect to that year's offering, Maryland Senate Bill 212. The bill failed to receive a committee vote.

Realizing the need to work in coalition for advancement of civil rights concerns, the Maryland Advocates for Gender Identity Protections (as MCTE was known then) set out to hold a series of community forums and listening sessions. Over the summer of 2012, the now newly named Maryland Coalition for Trans Equality held forums in Baltimore City, Montgomery County, Frederick County and Maryland's Eastern Shore. The results of these sessions and interaction with various organizations saw the building of an over 40 member coalition to seek passage of an anti-discrimination bill based on gender identity in Maryland.

In 2013, MCTE was able to secure Maryland Senate sponsorship with Senator Rich Madaleno along with 22 additional co-sponsors. In the Maryland Senate, only 24 votes are needed to secure a majority. Despite this overwhelming chamber support, the bill failed to receive a favorable committee report after a 5–6 vote against such. The one deciding vote was cast by Towson Maryland's senator, Jim Brochin whose district is entirely within Baltimore county, one of only four Maryland jurisdictions currently providing such sought after protections. Senator Brochin received in excess of 1000 constituent contacts to support the bill with only 3 opposing it. Senator Brochin still cast a no vote.

The follow are coalition members as of the end of the 2013 Maryland General Assembly session:

ACLU of Maryland, Advocates for Youth, Baltimore Black Pride, Black Trans Men, Bois of Baltimore, CASA of Maryland, Christ Congregational Church UCC, Equality Maryland, FreeState Legal Project, Gender Education & Advocacy, Inc., Gender Empowerment Maryland (GEM), Hearts and Ears, Hollaback Baltimore, Human Rights Campaign, LGBTQ Humanist Council of Baltimore, Maryland Black Family Alliance, Maryland NOW (National Organization for Women), Metro Area Gender Identity Connection (MAGIC), Metropolitan Community Churches/Global Justice Institute, Montgomery County Young Democrats, NARAL Pro-Choice Maryland, National Black Justice Coalition (NBJC), National Center for Lesbian Rights (NCLR), National Gay and Lesbian Task Force, Open Door MCC Church, OutServe – SLDN, PFLAG, Planned Parenthood of Maryland, Pride At Work, Baltimore- Washington Chapter, Progressive Maryland, Trans People of Color Coalition (TPOCC), SEIU 500, SEIU 1199, Trans Maryland, Unitarian Universalist Legislative Ministry of Maryland, Unitarian Universalists for Social Justice in the National Capital Region, Unity Fellowship Church of Baltimore, Unity Fellowship Church of Columbia, Women's Law Center of Maryland

== See also ==
- LGBT rights in Maryland
- List of LGBT rights organizations
