= Dana Beyer =

American politician and activist (born 1952)

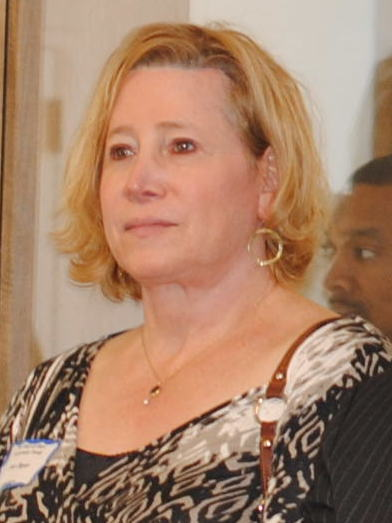
- Beyer in 2014
- Born: February 9, 1952 (age 74); New York City, United States
- Education: University of Pennsylvania School of Medicine (M.D., 1978); Cornell University (B.A., 1974)
- Occupation: Transgender rights activist in Maryland; Executive director of Gender Rights Maryland

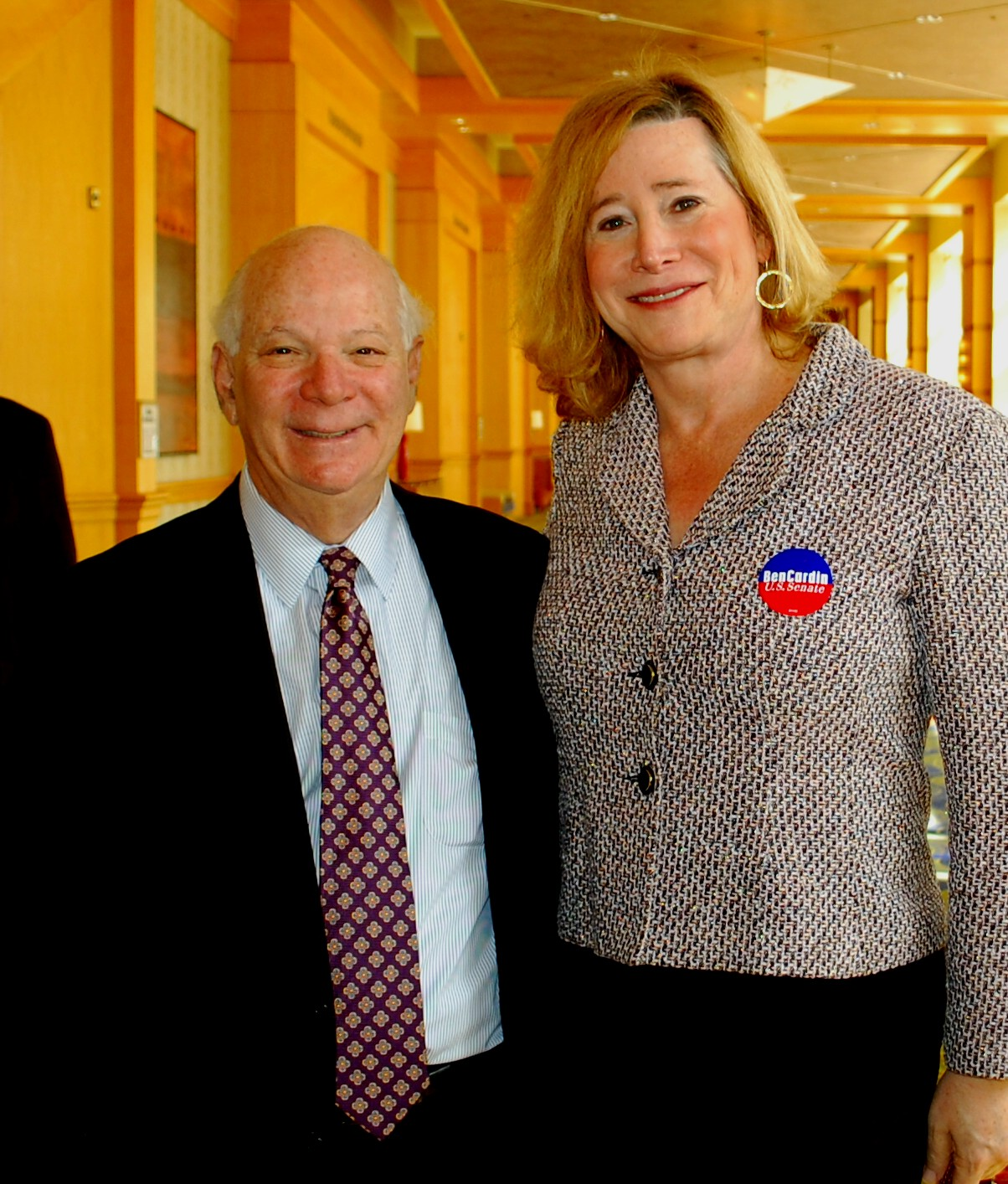
Senator Ben Cardin and Gender Rights Maryland executive director Dana Beyer at a March 2012 event in Rockville, Maryland

Dana Beyer (born February 9, 1952) is an American transgender rights advocate and the executive director of Gender Rights Maryland, a civil rights and advocacy organization serving Maryland's transgender community. She is a transgender woman.

== Biography ==
Beyer was born on February 9, 1952, in New York, New York. Beyer graduated from Cornell University in 1974 with a Bachelor of Arts degree and from University of Pennsylvania School of Medicine in 1978 as a Doctor of Medicine. In 2008, Beyer completed Harvard University's John F. Kennedy School of Government program for Senior Executives in State and Local Government as a David Bohnett Foundation LGBTQ Victory Institute Leadership Fellow.

She is executive director of Gender Rights Maryland. She used to be on the board of directors of Equality Maryland. In 2014, she sat on the board of directors for LGBT employment equality advocacy group Freedom to Work. She is on the board of the national Jewish LGBTQ organization Keshet.

She blogs about transgender topics at HuffPost.

She is a politician from Maryland who ran in the Democratic primary for state Senate District 18. She received 41.8% of the vote (4,890 votes) and lost the 2014 primary election to Senator Richard Madaleno, who was the incumbent.

She is Jewish, has two sons and lives in Chevy Chase, Maryland.

== Personal life ==
During her adolescence, she became an accidental participant in the LGBTQ civil rights movement known as Stonewall. That was an awakening event for her, and became the beginning of her "coming-out" process.
