= Maine Legislative Document 233 =

Proposed 2025 law in U.S. state

Legislative Document 233

Maine Legislature
- Long title: An Act to Prohibit Biological Males from Participating in School Athletic Programs and Activities Designated for Females When State Funding Is Provided to the School
- Territorial extent: Maine
- Enacted by: Maine House of Representatives
- Enacted: June 13, 2025
- Considered by: Maine Senate

Legislative history

First chamber: Maine House of Representatives
- Third reading: June 13, 2025
- Voting summary: 73 voted for; 70 voted against

Second chamber: Maine Senate
- Third reading: June 16, 2025
- Voting summary: 13 voted for; 21 voted against

Summary
- Prohibits transgender women and girls from competing in women's sports if they are competing in a school funded by the state.
- Status: Not passed

Maine Legislative Document 233 (LD 233) is a proposed 2025 law in the state of Maine that would prohibit transgender women from competing in women's sports if they compete in a school funded by the state. It passed the Maine House of Representatives on June 13, 2025, but failed its first vote in the Senate on June 16, 2025.

The topic of trans women in women's sports in Maine has gained both local and national attention. LD 233 followed a series of attacks and threats against Maine and Governor Janet Mills by the second Trump administration due to its current laws allowing transgender women to compete in women's sports, mostly involving threats to cut federal funding to Maine. The Department of Justice launched a lawsuit against Maine for the issue on April 16, 2025. West Virginia v. B. P. J., a case involving the same topic, is pending before the Supreme Court of the United States.

== Provisions ==
Legislative Document 233 prohibits anybody assigned male at birth, such as most trans women, from participating in sports designated for females only. It would apply when affected schools are funded by the state.

== Reactions ==
=== Opposition ===
GLBTQ Legal Advocates & Defenders, also known as GLAD Law, applauded the Maine Legislature for rejecting LD 233, along with other similar bills targeting transgender people.

== See also ==
- LGBTQ rights in Maine
- West Virginia v. B. P. J.
