= 2012 Maine Question 1 =

Referendum on same-sex marriage

Question 1: Citizen Initiative
- November 6, 2012
- An Act to Allow Marriage Licenses for Same-Sex Couples and Protect Religious Freedom

Results
Choice	Votes	%
Yes	370,770	52.60%
No	334,049	47.40%
Valid votes	704,819	97.65%
Invalid or blank votes	16,972	2.35%
Total votes	721,791	100.00%

Yes
60–70%
50–60%
No
60–70%
50–60%

Maine Question 1 was a voter referendum on an initiated state statute that occurred on November 6, 2012. The referendum was held to determine whether or not to legalize same-sex marriage. The referendum passed with a 53-47% vote legalizing same-sex marriage in Maine.

The law took effect on December 29, 2012.

== Background ==
In 2009, same-sex marriage legalization, "An Act To End Discrimination in Civil Marriage and Affirm Religious Freedom", was passed by the legislature and signed into law by Governor John Baldacci. A 2009 people's veto referendum to reject the law passed 53 to 47 percent, invalidating the law before it took effect.

On June 30, 2011, EqualityMaine and Gay & Lesbian Advocates & Defenders (GLAD) announced plans to place a voter initiative in support of same-sex marriage on Maine's November 2012 ballot. Supporters delivered more than 105,000 petition signatures for the initiative to the Secretary of State's office on January 26, 2012, exceeding the minimum of 57,277 signatures requirement. The Secretary of State announced on February 23 that the office verified 85,216 signatures, qualifying the initiative for the November 2012 ballot.

Under Maine's constitution, a valid initiative must be sent to the voters unless enacted in the proposed form by the Legislature at the same session during which it was presented. In March 2012, the Maine Legislature voted to indefinitely postpone the initiative without debate, effectively putting it on the November ballot.

== Ballot question ==
On June 14, 2012, Maine Secretary of State Charlie Summers, who opposed same-sex marriage, released the draft wording of the question as it would appear on the ballot, beginning a 30-day public comment period, at the end of which he had ten days to determine the wording of the question. He proposed the following wording:

Do you want to allow same-sex couples to marry?

The petitions that supporters circulated was as follows:

Do you favor a law allowing marriage licenses for same-sex couples, and that protects religious freedom by ensuring that no religion or clergy be required to perform such a marriage in violation of their religious beliefs?

Opponents of the initiative claimed that the latter part of the circulated question is unnecessary, as the religious freedom to refuse to perform same-sex marriages is guaranteed by the First Amendment of the United States Constitution. They also criticized the wording for failing to mention redefining marriage. Supporters of the initiative said the Secretary of State's proposed wording "fails to address important parts of the initiative that will be on the ballot in November". Though they concede the First Amendment point made by the measure's opponents, they asked Summers, whose good faith they did not question, to restore the reference to protecting religious freedom because they claim opponents "distort the facts around what the approval of same-sex marriage will do, including the possibility that churches would lose their tax-exempt status by refusing to perform same-sex marriages."

The final wording Summers chose is "Do you want to allow the State of Maine to issue marriage licenses to same-sex couples?" Representatives of both sides of the issue stated they had no major problems with Summers' decision.

== Campaign ==
EqualityMaine and Mainers United for Marriage began the campaign for the initiative on May 15, 2012.

By June 28, Mainers United for Marriage had raised more than $1 million, with 64 percent of contributions coming from within Maine.

On July 23, the Maine ACLU and Mainers United for Marriage held a press conference to announce the formation of the group Republicans United for Marriage as part of an effort to attract more Republican support of the initiative. Fifteen Republicans appeared at the conference, including three current state legislators. One of those, Rep. Stacey Fitts of Pittsfield, had voted against the 2009 same-sex marriage law passed by the previous Legislature but stated that he has now changed his mind after discussions with gay persons that he knows and his family. Fitts also said he felt his new views were a "perfect match" with his Republican philosophy of small government. Pastor Bob Emerich, a spokesman for initiative opponents, dismissed the announcement as "insignificant" and questioned "why these people even call themselves Republicans."

President Barack Obama, through a spokesperson, endorsed the initiative on October 24.

On October 25, Richard Malone, former Catholic Bishop of Portland, stated that supporting the initiative was "unfaithful to Catholic doctrine" and that Catholics whose conscience was formed through scripture could not justify voting for any candidate or referendum that opposes the teachings of the Church. He said that Catholics for Marriage Equality did not speak for the Catholic Church.

Democratic U.S. Representatives Chellie Pingree and Mike Michaud both stated they intended to vote in favor of the referendum, while Republican U.S. Senators Susan Collins and Olympia Snowe both stated that their policy was to not comment on state level issues. Governor Paul LePage, through his spokeswoman, also declined to offer his views on the referendum. Collins and Snowe would both state their support for same-sex marriage after the referendum.

The referendum was declared passed on November 6, 2012 by the Associated Press, and opposition group Protect Marriage Maine conceded defeat at 1:30 am on November 7, 2012. 53% of Maine voted in favor.

== Polling ==
Many opinion polls were done to estimate the results of the referendum. Polling were as follows.

Date of opinion poll	Conducted by	Sample size (likely voters)	Yes	No	Undecided	Margin of Error
October 28–31, 2011	Public Policy Polling	673	48%	35%	17%	±3.8%
March 2–4, 2012	Public Policy Polling	1,256	47%	32%	21%	±2.8%
June 13–14, 2012	MassINC Polling Group	506	55%	36%	9%	±4.4%
June 20–25, 2012	Critical Insights	615	57%	35%	8%	±4%
September 12–16, 2012	Critical Insights	618	57%	36%	7%	±4%
September 15–17, 2012	Maine People's Resource Center	856	53%	43%	4%	±3.35%
September 17–18, 2012	Public Policy Polling	804	52%	44%	4%	±3.5%
September 24–28, 2012	Pan Atlantic SMS Group	400	56.6%	39%	4.5%	±4.9%
October 30–31, 2012	Critical Insights	613	55%	42%	3%	±4%
November 1–2, 2012	Public Policy Polling	1633	52%	45%	3%	±2.4%
November 1–3, 2012	Maine People's Resource Center	905	50.5%	46.5%	2.9%	±3.26%

== Results ==
52.6% of voters voted to legalize same-sex marriage while 47.4% of voters voted not to which resulted in Maine legalizing same-sex marriage.

Breakdown of voting by county
County	Yes	Votes	No	Votes
Androscoggin	44.60%	24,052	55.4%	28,598
Aroostook	33.16%	11,181	66.84%	22,562
Cumberland	65.12%	105,415	34.88%	56,865
Franklin	46.65%	7,639	53.35%	8,702
Hancock	56.91%	17,254	43.09%	13,149
Kennebec	48.75%	30,780	51.25%	32,372
Knox	55.13%	12,129	44.87%	9,876
Lincoln	51.86%	10,661	48.14%	9,849
Oxford	45.89%	13,358	54.11%	15,810
Penobscot	46.91%	36,062	53.09%	40,865
Piscataquis	37.41%	3,347	62.59%	5,600
Sagadahoc	54.63%	11,309	45.37%	9,330
Somerset	40.28%	9,934	59.72%	14,767
Waldo	51.25%	10,724	48.75%	10,212
Washington	40.90%	6,512	59.1%	9,240
York	56.63%	60,413	43.37%	46,252
Total	52.60%	370,770	47.40%	334,049

== Aftermath ==
Supporters of same-sex marriage celebrated the passage of the referendum. After the referendum Matt McTighe, campaign manager of Mainers United for Marriage, stated that "A lot of families in Maine just became more stable and secure." Brian Brown, president of the National Organization for Marriage, stated that "Americans remain strongly in favor of marriage as the union of one man and one woman. The election results reflect the political and funding advantages our opponents enjoyed in these very liberal states." The law officially took effect on December 29, 2012.

== See also ==
- Same-sex marriage in Maine
- LGBT rights in Maine

=== Other same-sex marriage referendums ===
- Australian Marriage Law Postal Survey, 2017
- 2016 Bermudian same-sex union and marriage referendum
- 2013 Croatian constitutional referendum
- Irish same-sex marriage referendum, 2015
- 2015 Slovak same-sex marriage referendum
- 2015 Slovenian same-sex marriage referendum
- 2021 Swiss same-sex marriage referendum
- United States:
  - Maine:
    - 2009 Maine Question 1
  - 2012 Maryland Question 6
  - 2012 Washington Referendum 74
  - 2012 Minnesota Amendment 1
  - 2020 Nevada Question 2
  - 2024 California Proposition 3
  - 2024 Colorado Amendment J
  - 2024 Hawaii Amendment 1
  - 2026 Virginia Repeal Same-Sex Marriage Ban Amendment
