= LGBTQ rights in Maryland =

- Maryland (US)
- Legal status: Legal since 1999
- Gender identity: Transgender people allowed to change legal gender without surgery
- Discrimination protections: Protections for both sexual orientation and gender identity (see below)

Family rights
- Recognition of relationships: Same-sex marriage since 2013
- Adoption: Same-sex couples permitted to adopt

Lesbian, gay, bisexual, transgender, and queer (LGBTQ) people in the U.S. state of Maryland enjoy the same rights as non-LGBTQ people. Maryland's anti-sodomy laws were ruled unconstitutional in 1999 and were officially repealed by the state legislature in 2023. Maryland has had statewide protections against discrimination based on an individual's sexual orientation since 2001 and gender identity since 2014. Legislation to legalize same-sex marriage in Maryland was approved by voters on November 6, 2012, and went into effect on January 1, 2013.

Today, the state of Maryland is regarded as one of the most LGBTQ-friendly states in the country, with a 2022 Public Religion Research Institute showing that 87% of Marylanders support LGBTQ anti-discrimination laws. Additionally, a ban on conversion therapy on minors became effective on October 1, 2018. In October 2020, Montgomery County passed unanimously an ordinance that implemented an LGBTIQ+ bill of rights.

== History and legality of same-sex sexual activity ==
Same-sex sexual activity was criminalized in the Province of Maryland. The colonial law in Maryland mandated the death penalty for buggery. In August and September 1642, sodomy was described as a "capital offence" within the colony by the Maryland General Assembly. Previously, in 1638, it had been deemed a felony. In 1776, the Maryland Declaration of Rights incorporated the English common law "along with its sodomy prohibition". By December 1789, state law still deemed sodomy a felony. The statute passed that year punished sodomy between free men with hard labor, with the possibility of being whipped for any misconduct. The death penalty was proscribed for slaves, though the courts could commute the sentence to 14 years at hard labor. In January 1810, the penalty for sodomy was changed to 1–10 years' imprisonment and the distinction between slaves and free men was eliminated. The first recorded sodomy case in Maryland, also the first such case in the entire United States, occurred in 1810.

In Davis v. State, the Maryland Court of Appeals upheld, by a vote of 4–1, an indictment that charged Davis with sodomy. In 1847, The Justices’ Practice under the Laws of Maryland; including the Duties of a Constable, a book by John H. B. Latrobe, noted that murders, while committing sodomy and other crimes, was to be deemed a first-degree murder, and that sodomy consisted of "carnal knowledge committed the order of nature" by men with other men, women with other women, or men and women engaging in bestiality. In March 1892, the Maryland General Assembly enacted a law stating that sodomy, and other felonies, may be prosecuted upon order from a Baltimore County Circuit Court.

During the period before World War I, many cities established so-called vice commissions to investigate reports of "perversion". The state also created a commission which reported in 1915 of cases of fellatio (oral sex), "heterosexual masochism and sadism" and homosexual activity in several cities, notably Baltimore. In April 1916, as a result of the report, the state enacted a new law prohibiting oral sex, whether heterosexual or homosexual, with a penalty of up to 10 years' imprisonment and/or a fine of 1,000 dollars. The law was enacted with the claim it was "necessary for the immediate preservation of the public safety" and that it was "emergency" legislation. It also prohibited any other "unnatural or perverted sexual practice". A law enacted in April 1920 further defined lewdness as "any unnatural sexual practice".

In Wentz v. State (1930), it was stated that "in cases involving sexual offenses...[including] sodomy [and] indecent liberties", there was an exception to the rule that other offenses other than the one "charged is admissible". In April 1931, a law enacted by the Maryland General Assembly stated all murder committed, or attempt to perpetrate, any sodomy, related crimes, or escape from correctional institutions, shall be charged as "murder in the first degree". In April 1934, in the case of Lutz v. State, Judge T. Scott Offutt spoke for the unanimous Maryland Court of Appeals, arguing that the April 1920 law "is directed to the suppression of sexual vice and perversion practiced for gain[.]" In 1941, there was another sodomy case before the court, in Berger v. State, in which a heterosexual physician was prosecuted for acts of sodomy. In March 1951, a law enacted by the Maryland General Assembly stated that sodomy, and other felonies, were exempted from prosecution upon order from the Prince George's County Circuit Court. Another heterosexual case happened in 1952; in Haley v. State. The Court of Appeals unanimously sustained the state's rights to prosecute heterosexual "unnatural and perverted practices". A challenge to the sodomy case was rejected by the Court of Appeals in 1956 in State v. Black. Numerous more sodomy court cases occurred over the following years. By the 1960s, gay people in Baltimore were prosecuted for the crime of solicitation, while those elsewhere would be charged with the crime of "exposure", or charged with other crimes.

In 1970, a state commission recommended decriminalizing "private homosexual acts of adults", by a vote of 12–2. The commission noted that practices in Maryland included frequent entrapment by "decoy" police, and suicides occasionally occurred from sodomy arrests. Scholar Robert G. Fisher, applying the Kinsey Report statistics to Maryland, estimated that there were 100,000 "practicing male homosexuals" in the state. The Maryland General Assembly did not follow the recommendations of the commission. In 1976, the Senate passed a bill to repeal the sodomy law, but it failed to pass the House, and repeal bills subsequently passed the Senate twice, in 1977 and 1987, but were rejected in the House. A legal challenge to the law on the grounds of privacy violations was rejected by the Court of Appeals in 1980 in Kelly v. State.

All laws against non-commercial, private consensual sex were overturned by Maryland state courts. The decision in Schochet v. State (1990) invalidated laws against private consensual sex between heterosexual adults. The decision was criticized for leaving same-gender couples who practice oral sex or anal sex "vulnerable to prosecution". In October 1998, the decision in Williams v. Glendening by Judge Richard T. Rombro invalidated laws against private consensual oral sex between persons of the same sex. While the judge did not saw that the law violated the Maryland constitution, a subsequent settlement in Williams in 1999 invalidated laws against private consensual anal sex. The settlement was praised by ACLU as the "first deal of its kind" which removed an "outmoded" law. However, some scholars argued that the decision was a victory for privacy rights of Marylanders but "stopped short of completely decriminalizing...sexual intimacy" in the state, called for modifying the Annotated Code of Maryland to ensure the decision is followed, and full decriminalization of sodomy in the state. In 1999, ACLU and Lambda Legal, which had launched efforts to challenge sodomy laws, won a victory in a lower Maryland court, with the Maryland government consenting to the judgement. Lambda had previously participated in the 1994 case, North v. North, in Maryland.

In March 2003, Delegate Maggie McIntosh, majority leader of the Maryland House of Delegates, became Maryland's first legislator to "come out of the closet". Previously, in November 1980, Robert Bauman, a Maryland U.S. representative, lost re-election to Roy Dyson, after admitting that "homosexual tendencies" and alcoholism caused him to solicit a 16-year-old male prostitute for sexual intercourse. Previously in October 1980, he had been charged for soliciting sex from a prostitute, and had apologized to voters for his indiscretions. He ran for a House seat again in 1982, but withdrew from the race before primary election day. In June 2022, it was reported that various "openly gay and lesbian candidates" were running for election, or seeking re-election, in Montgomery, Prince George's and Howard Counties of Maryland.

On January 30, 2020, Maryland Senate began discussion of a bill, proposed by Sen. Susan Lee, to repeal the unenforceable and unconstitutional sodomy ban. It was approved by the Senate, with amendments, on March 18. The Maryland House of Delegates accepted the amendments the same day. The codified law took effect and was implemented on October 1, 2020. Just immediately before Easter 2023, a bill passed both houses of the Maryland General Assembly to formally repeal the archaic law banning oral sex, which became law without Governor Wes Moore's signature. The law took effect October 1, 2023.

=== July 2021 police raids ===
In July 2021, several men under police raids within Maryland were arrested for gay sex, but not heterosexual sex, under the Unnatural or Perverted Sexual Practices Act, still on the books. Maryland's General Assembly in 2020 voted to repeal the anal sex law, but the Senate amended the bill to not repeal the oral sex ban, so it was left intact. In June 2022, a bill to repeal the law died in Maryland Senate Judicial Proceedings Committee, but committee chair Senator William C. Smith Jr., and the bill's sponsor State Senator Clarence Lam, said they would take up the issue in 2023. In May 2023, the bill become law without Governor's signature to formally repeal the oral sex ban and went into effect on October 1.

== Recognition of same-sex relationships ==
In 1973, Maryland became the first state to ban civil marriage between persons of the same sex, with the passage of legislation amending the family law statute. In Deane and Polyak v. Conaway in 2006, seventeen Maryland plaintiffs pushed for legal marriage rights, supported by the ACLU.

Since 2008, a limited form of domestic partnership has been available to all unmarried couples at least 18 years of age, who can verify their interdependent relationship through documentation. Legal protections for partners include hospital visitation, end-of-life decisions, and joint property rights. Since 2009, Maryland has provided employee benefits to the same-sex partners of state employees. The state has recognized valid same-sex marriages performed in other states and jurisdictions since 2010.

On March 15, 2011, the Maryland House of Delegates returned a bill to legalize same-sex marriage to the Judiciary Committee, tabling it for the rest of the legislative session, but keeping it alive until January 2012, with opposition from Catholic bishops in the state. In 2012, a same-sex marriage bill was introduced in the Maryland General Assembly. After much debate, the law permitting same-sex marriage, known as the Civil Marriage Protection Act, was approved by the House of Delegates in a 72–67 vote on February 17, 2012, and was approved by the Senate in a 25–22 vote on February 23, 2012. Governor O'Malley signed the law on March 1, 2012.

Same-sex marriage has been legal since January 1, 2013. The law took effect after 52.4% of voters approved Maryland Question 6 in a referendum held on November 6, 2012. The vote was hailed as a watershed moment by gay rights activists and marked the first time marriage rights in the United States were extended to same-sex couples by popular vote. Roman Catholic authorities and African-American religious leaders throughout the state, especially in Prince George's County, had opposed the legislation, saying it would conflict with the best interests of society and threaten religious liberty.

In October 2020, Montgomery County unanimously passed an ordinance that implemented an LGBTIQ+ bill of rights.

In April 2021, the Maryland General Assembly (Senate vote 38-8 and House vote 107–28) passed a bill (HB130) to establish a 15-member commission on LGBTIQ+ affairs in Maryland, and the law took effect in October 2021. The first administrative director was appointed to the commission by Governor Larry Hogan in July 2022. In April 2023, legislation was passed and signed into law to reform the LGBTIQ+ Commission of Affairs and increase the membership to 21 people.

In January 2023, Human Rights Campaign gave Maryland, and 20 other jurisdictions, the highest rating, of "Working Toward Innovative Equality".

=== Adoption and parenting ===
State law permits single LGBT adults and married same-sex couples to petition to adopt. Previously, in 1994, a domestic partners registry had been rejected in Baltimore, the Supreme Court of Maryland had ruled, in December 1998, that trial judges cannot make distinctions between gay and heterosexual parents when deciding child custody cases, and in April 2001, a Maryland court ruled that a lesbian mother was a de facto mother of a child, despite not being the "biological mother".

Lesbian couples have access to in vitro fertilization. State law recognizes the non-genetic, non-gestational mother as a legal parent to a child born via donor insemination, but only if the parents are married. In 2015, the Maryland General Assembly passed a law requiring health insurers to offer fertility treatments as a benefit, regardless of a person's sexual orientation. Governor Larry Hogan did not sign or veto the bill, and it became law without a signature.

Surrogacy arrangements are legal and recognized in the state. Despite no explicit laws on the matter, in 2007 the Maryland Court of Appeals made a ruling approving of gestational surrogacy arrangements. Traditional surrogacy arrangements on the other hand may result in potential legal complications; in 2000 the Attorney-General issued an opinion stating that "surrogacy contracts that involve the payment of a fee to the birth mother are, in most instances, illegal and unenforceable under Maryland law." The state treats different-sex and same-sex couples equally under the same terms and conditions.

=== LGBT education in public schools ===
In August 2019, the Maryland Department of Education announced it would provide resources on LGBT history and other educational resources sometime by mid-2020 in all Maryland public schools.

In April 2022, a bill (HB850) passed the Maryland General Assembly that will include both sexual orientation and gender identity inclusive policies within all public schools in Maryland and plus safety outcomes for LGBT students.

=== Honorable discharges for LGBT military veterans ===
In April 2022, the Maryland General Assembly (Senate vote 47-0 and House vote 109–1) passed a bill HB1380 to automatically return retrospectively "honorable discharges" to LGBT individuals, who lived within Maryland at the time. A conference committee has to sort out the differences between bills passed with amendments, before the bill goes straight to the Governor's desk. The bill went into effect on October 1, 2022.

=== Conversion therapy ===
In April 2018, the General Assembly passed a bill to ban conversion therapy on minors. The legislation passed the Senate by 34 votes to 12, and the House 95 votes to 27. In May 2018, the bill was signed into law by Governor Larry Hogan, and went into effect on October 1, 2018.

In January 2019, a constitutional challenge against the conversion therapy ban was filed in federal court. In September 2019, District Judge Deborah K. Chasanow dismissed the challenge, stating that "[The conversion therapy ban] doesn't prevent licensed therapists from expressing their personal views about conversion therapy to minor clients...The law only prohibits conversion therapy when it is conducted by licensed practitioners on minors and prohibits only speech uttered in the process of conducting conversion therapy".

== Discrimination protections ==
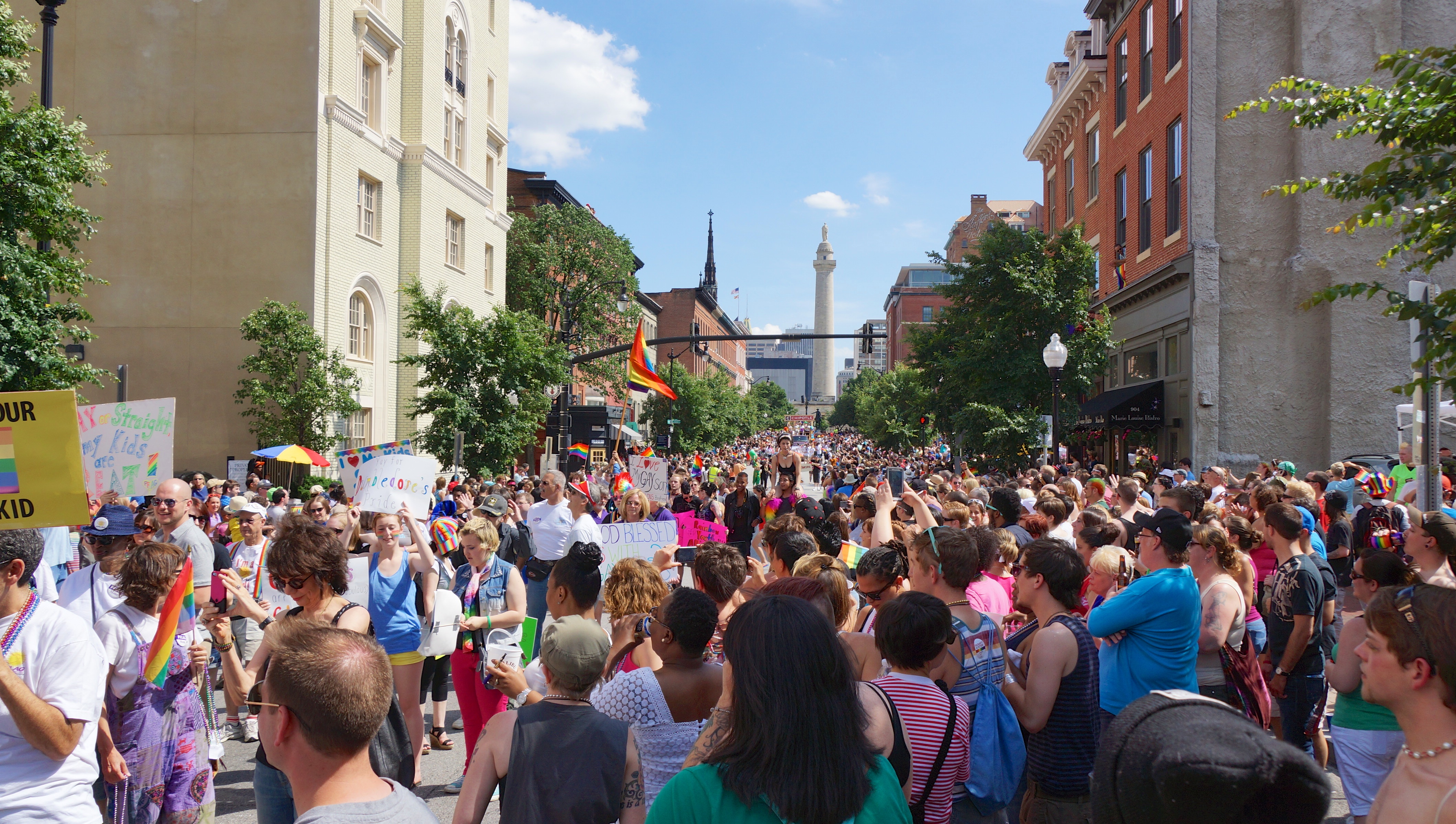
Participants at the Baltimore Pride parade in 2013

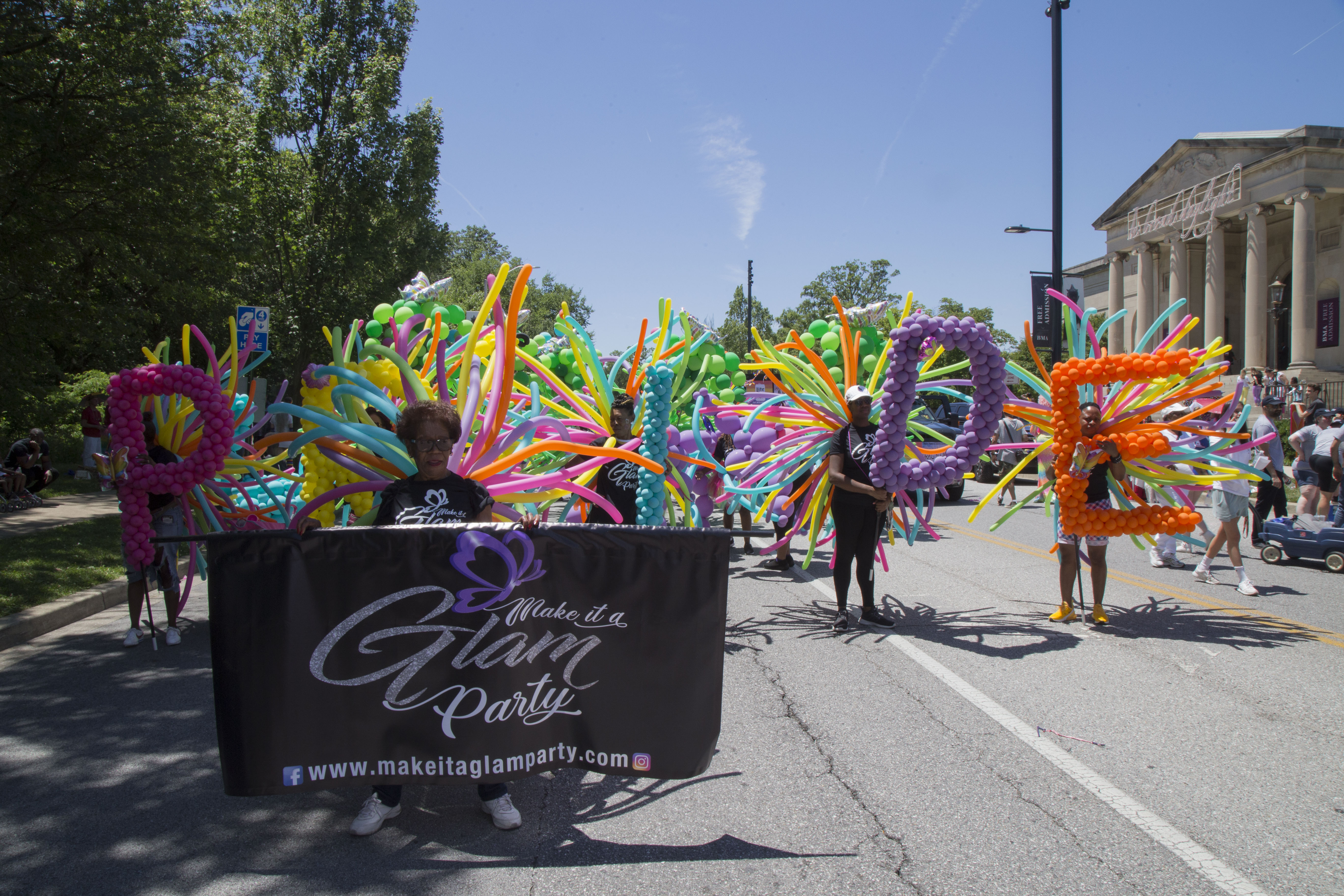
2019 Baltimore Pride parade

In August 2023, the Maryland Supreme Court made a formal ruling allowing discrimination on the basis of sexual orientation - within a Catholic organization, building or setting as a charity. Since 2001, discrimination on the basis of sexual orientation is illegal by legislation within Maryland. In May 1977, a House Bill 921 passed the Maryland House of Delegates which forbid "discrimination against homosexuals in employment". However, it was not until 2001 that state law began protecting against unfair discrimination based on sexual orientation and not until 2014 on gender identity.

On May 15, 2001, Governor Parris Glendening signed into law the Antidiscrimination Act of 2001 passed by the Maryland General Assembly, which added protection against discrimination based on sexual orientation. Opponents of the law collected enough petition signatures to put it to a referendum in the 2002 elections, but the petition was successfully challenged in court, and the Act took effect on November 21, 2001. Prior to Glendenning's signature and passage of the law by the General Assembly, the group Free State Justice did a "textbook campaign" to convince legislators, even convincing the Catholic Church to boost the bill.

Before the state anti-discrimination statute included gender identity, five jurisdictions—Baltimore City, Baltimore County, Howard County, Hyattsville, and Montgomery County—protected against discrimination based on gender identity. Nineteen of the 20 remaining counties without protections lacked the authority to establish them. Legislation to amend the state anti-discrimination law to include gender identity, the Fairness for All Marylanders Act of 2013, was introduced in January 2013. Although the bill had 23 senators as cosponsors, on March 14, 2013, a Senate committee rejected it on a 6–5 vote. Similar bills had been rejected in previous years. The bill was introduced again in 2014, approved 8–3 by the Senate Judicial Proceedings Committee on February 20 and passed 32–15 by the Senate on March 4. The House of Delegates passed the bill on an 82–57 vote on March 27, 2014. On May 15, 2014, Governor Martin O'Malley signed the bill, the Fairness for All Marylanders Act of 2014, which took effect on October 1, 2014.

Legislation in Maryland is subject to popular referendum, and conservative activists mounted an effort to put the law's expanded protections to a statewide referendum by collecting the 55,736 signatures of registered voters needed to place the measure on the ballot. They needed to submit 18,579 signatures to the Secretary of State by May 31 and the remaining 37,157 by June 30. The petitioners failed to submit the required number of signatures by those deadlines, and the law took effect as scheduled on October 1, 2014.

=== Hate crime law and gay panic defense abolition ===
The state's hate crime law provides additional legal penalties for a crime motivated by the victim's perceived or actual sexual orientation or gender identity.

In April 2021, the Maryland General Assembly (House vote 136-0 and Senate vote 47–0) passed a bill (HB231) to abolish the common-law gay or trans panic defense. Governor Larry Hogan took no action on the bill (HB231) and the law went into effect on October 1, 2021.

== Transgender people and rights ==
In March 2024, the Maryland Senate passed a bill by a vote of 33-13 that openly declaring Maryland a “sanctuary state for protecting and defending transgender individuals”. The bill was passed by the Maryland House of Delegates by a vote of 97-38 and signed into law by Governor Wes Moore. The act went into effect on October 1, 2024.

In June 2023, the Governor of Maryland signed an executive order that "protects, shields and defends" all and/or any transgender individuals - who want unimpeded access to gender-affirming healthcare within Maryland's borders. Since January 1, 2024 Maryland also later implemented a broad based state healthcare insurance law that went into effect - regarded as the "most transgender healthcare friendly policies within the United States".

In 2015, the Maryland General Assembly passed a law to make it easier for transgender people to change the gender marker on their birth certificates without undergoing sex reassignment surgery or sterilization. Governor Larry Hogan took no action on the bill, and it became law without a signature on October 1, 2015. The Department of Health and Mental Hygiene will issue an updated birth certificate upon receipt of certification from a licensed healthcare provider confirming the applicant's gender identity.

In 2019, the General Assembly passed a law allowing for an "X" gender marker on identity documents issued by the Motor Vehicle Administration. The bill also removed the requirement that people changing their gender marker provide legal or medical documentation. Governor Hogan took no action on the bill, so it went into effect on October 1, 2019. The Maryland State Board of Elections also began accepting "X" gender markers on voter registration forms on October 1, 2019. As of 2023, gender X is still not available on Maryland birth certificates.

In May 2022, it was announced that the University of Maryland will make gender X option available on forms and documents alongside male and female options for student enrollment in 2026. Until then, non-binary students have to either choose "male or female gender markers."

=== Transgender legal reforms ===
In April 2021, two bills passed the Maryland General Assembly. The first bill (HB39) that passed repeals an archaic 1971 Maryland law that required individuals to publish their names within a newspaper, argued to be a breach of privacy, before they even can legally change their name on a birth certificate. The second bill corrects a 2002 Maryland hate crime law that now explicitly includes "gender identity" as a completely separate category (instead of being included under the sexual orientation definition). The Governor of Maryland Larry Hogan took no action on the two bills, so they went into effect on October 1, 2021.

=== Bathroom ordinances ===
In March 2018, the United States District Court for the District of Maryland ruled that federal and state law protected rights of transgender students to "use the restroom and locker rooms in alignment with their gender identity", in a case striking down policy of Talbot County Public Schools.

In July 2022, the county council of Montgomery County approved by a 9–0 vote an ordinance to legally allow, recognize, and implement gender-neutral bathrooms. The city of Baltimore has a similar gender-neutral bathroom ordinance.

=== Sports ===
In February 1994, field hockey player Vicki Yost, who attended University of Maryland from 1988 to 1992, sued the school's coach, Margaret Meharg, and athletic director, Suzanne Taylor, for reportedly forcing her to hide her lesbian identity, and asked for $1.5 million in damages, with charges denied by coach Meharg.

In February 2022, a report by the Montgomery County Office of Legislative Oversight noted that gender non-conforming and transgender athletes can participate in Maryland accordance with their gender identity "without requiring proof, documentation, or medical or legal transition", and that participation by such individuals is not tracked by the county.

In March 2022, the Maryland House of Delegates Ways and Means Committee voted down a law, proposed by Delegate Kathy Szeliga, which would have restricted interscholastic or intramural sports teams based on "biological sex". The Harvard Law School LGBTQ+ Advocacy Clinic and FreeState Justice said that the law's defeat was a victory for "the rights of transgender athletes". A policy coordinator at FreeState Justice, Jamie Grace Alexander, argued that the law "specifically targets transgender girls". The law was re-introduced in January 2023 by Szeliga and co-sponsored by 32 delegates, but failed to advance out of committee.

=== Medicaid reform expansion and services ===
In March 2023, a bill passed both houses of the Maryland General Assembly to explicitly include sexual reassignment surgery on Medicaid "state based healthcare coverage" programs, reforms, expansion and/or services within Maryland - "for eligible Maryland based individual residents over 18 years old". The Governor of Maryland signed the bill into law a month later in April formally, and will go into legal effect from January 1, 2024.

== Public opinion ==
A 2017 Public Religion Research Institute poll found that 66% of Maryland residents supported same-sex marriage, while 25% were opposed and 9% were unsure. A March 2022 Public Religion Research Institute stated that 87% of Marylanders support LGBTQ anti-discrimination laws, with The Hill saying that this percentage had increased by "11 percentage points or more" since 2015.

A 2022 Public Religion Research Institute (PRRI) poll found that 71% of Maryland residents supported same-sex marriage, while 26% were opposed and 2% were unsure. Additionally, 76% of Maryland residents supported discrimination protections covering sexual orientation and gender identity. 12% were opposed.

Public opinion for LGBTQ anti-discrimination laws in Maryland
Poll source	Date(s) administered	Sample size	Margin of error	% support	% opposition	% no opinion
Public Religion Research Institute	January 2-December 30, 2019	967	+/- 0.4	74%	19%	7%
Public Religion Research Institute	January 3-December 30, 2018	949	+/- 0.4	70%	23%	7%
Public Religion Research Institute	April 5-December 23, 2017	1,220	+/- 0.6	77%	17%	6%
Public Religion Research Institute	April 29, 2015-January 7, 2016	1,349	+/- 0.4	73%	22%	5%

== Summary table ==
Same-sex sexual activity legal with an equal age of consent (16)	Yes (Since 1999; codified in 2023)
Interdiction of attempted book bans implemented	No (Since 2025, under a court ruling)
Anti-discrimination laws for both sexual orientation and gender identity in all areas	Yes (Since 2001 for sexual orientation and since 2014 for gender identity)
LGBTQ bill of rights	Yes / No (Since 2020 in Montgomery County only)
Both domestic partnerships and same-sex marriage laws implemented	Yes (Since 2008/2013, via a state referendum)
Both joint and stepchild adoption by same-sex couples	Yes
Gender-neutral bathroom policy implemented	Yes / No (Some cities and counties, not statewide - Baltimore and Montgomery County only)
Lesbian, gay and bisexual people allowed to serve openly in the US military - including the Maryland National Guard	Yes (Since 2011 - federal policy)
Transgender people allowed to serve openly in the US military - including the Maryland National Guard	Yes / No (Banished to the army)
Medicaid insurance covering sexual reassignment surgery for individuals over 18 years old	Yes (Since 2024)
Intersex people allowed to serve openly in the military	No
Right to change legal gender without surgery	Yes (Since 2015)
"Gay or trans panic defense" under common-law abolished or repealed	Yes (Since 2021)
Access to IVF for lesbian couples and parantage on birth certificates	Yes
Third gender option	Yes / No (Since 2019 for driver's licenses, currently not available for birth certificates)
Conversion therapy banned on minors	Yes (Since 2018)
Surrogacy arrangements legal for gay male couples and parentage on birth certificates	Yes
MSMs allowed to donate blood with conditions (i.e. such as being monogamous)	Yes

== See also ==
- Equality Maryland
- Gender Rights Maryland
- Maryland Coalition for Trans Equality
- Pride Center of Maryland
- LGBT culture in Baltimore
- Gay Life
