= LGBTQ rights in Maine =

- Maine (US)
- Legal status: Legal since 1976
- Gender identity: Altering sex on birth certificate and other documents allowed
- Discrimination protections: Sexual orientation and gender identity protections (see below)

Family rights
- Recognition of relationships: Same-sex marriage since 2012; Domestic partnerships since 2004
- Adoption: Same-sex couples allowed to adopt

Lesbian, gay, bisexual, transgender, and queer (LGBTQ) people in the U.S. state of Maine have the same legal rights as non-LGBTQ people. Same-sex marriage has been recognized in Maine since December 2012, following a referendum in which a majority of voters approved an initiative to legalize same-sex marriage. Discrimination on the basis of sexual orientation and gender identity is prohibited in the areas of employment, housing, credit and public accommodations. In addition, the use of conversion therapy on minors has been outlawed since 2019, and joint adoption is permitted for same-sex couples.

== History and law regarding same-sex sexual activity ==
Upon statehood in 1820, Maine continued to enforce Massachusetts law. At the time, Massachusetts law punished anal intercourse with hard labor of up to ten years. One year later, Maine enacted its own sodomy law, essentially copying the Massachusetts law, reading: "That if any man shall commit the crime against nature with a man or male child, or man or woman shall have carnal copulation with a beast..." The penalty was set at one year's solitary confinement followed by 10 years of hard labor. A revision in 1840 removed the gender-specifics (heterosexual sodomy was made criminal), the one year of solitary confinement and the hard labor provision. The penalty was finally set at a maximum of up to ten years' imprisonment. This would remain unchanged until 1976.

The first court case dealing with the issue occurred in 1938. In State v. Cyr, the Maine Supreme Court unanimously ruled that fellatio (oral sex) constituted an offense and fell under the scope of the sodomy statute as being a "crime against nature". In this particular case, Cyr had engaged in oral sex with an unnamed woman. Even though the woman had performed the act, only Cyr was prosecuted. In 1939 in the case of State v. Langelier, the same court held that consent was no defense to a charge of sodomy (both consensual and non-consensual activity could be prosecuted). The sodomy law was broadened to include acts of cunnilingus in 1950 in State v. Townsend. In State v. Pratt in 1955, the state Supreme Court ruled that masturbation, despite being a "vile, unnatural and detestable sexual perversion", was not a violation of the sodomy statute.

In the 1960s, a gay man prosecuted for sodomy attempted to have the law overturned as unconstitutionally vague and an invasion of privacy, though the state Supreme Court ruled against the plaintiff in State v. White in 1966. The last sodomy case was State v. Pratt decided in 1973, where the Supreme Court overturned the conviction of Pratt for sodomy because the trial judge had instructed the jury that sodomy was complete upon a mere touching of a penis. The Supreme Court reiterated state law that actual penetration had to be proven.

Maine repealed its statutory criminalization of same-sex sexual activity in 1976. Sodomy between heterosexual partners was legalized at the same time. The age of consent was set at 16.

== Recognition of same-sex relationships ==
Maine established domestic partnerships for same-sex couples in April 2004.

Following legal developments in Hawaii, as well as several European countries and Canada, Maine enacted a ban on same-sex marriage in 1997. On May 6, 2009, the state enacted a law to allow same-sex marriage. Before the law went into effect however, it was repealed by a referendum on November 3, 2009.

On January 26, 2012, a petition for a same-sex marriage initiative was delivered to the Secretary of State with over 105,000, more than needed to qualify for the ballot. On November 7, 2012, a majority of Maine voters approved the initiative, known as Question 1, by a margin of 53% to 47%, legalizing same-sex marriage in the state. The law took effect on December 29, 2012.

Maine has provided benefits to same-sex partners of state employees since 2001.

== Adoption and parenting ==
Maine law permits single LGBT individuals and same-sex couples, whether married or unmarried, to petition to adopt.

Lesbian couples have access to in vitro fertilization. State law recognizes the non-genetic, non-gestational mother as a legal parent to a child born via donor insemination, irrespective of the marital status of the parents. In addition, surrogacy arrangements are legal and recognized in the state. Same-sex couples are treated in the same manner as opposite-sex couples in using the gestational or traditional surrogacy process.

== Discrimination protections ==
Maine law penalizes discrimination in employment, housing, credit, public accommodations and education opportunity on the basis of actual or perceived sexual orientation or gender identity or expression, among other categories. The law was amended to add these protections in 2005, passing the House of Representatives 91–58 and the Senate 25–10. It was challenged in a veto referendum, which was defeated by 55% of voters on November 8, 2005; as a result, the law remained on the books.

Legislation to protect LGBTQ people from unfair discrimination was first proposed in 1977, though did not pass either chamber of the Maine Legislature. A bill passed both the House and Senate in 1993, but was vetoed by Governor John R. McKernan Jr. Another bill passed both chambers in 1999 and was signed into law by Governor Angus King, but was defeated in a referendum on November 7, 2000, by a margin of 4,000 votes.

On June 17, 2021 the Maine Legislature passed and the Governor of Maine signed a bill (LD1688) - to explicitly include "gender identity and family status" throughout all of Maine legal statutes, not just discrimination laws.

== Healthcare facilities data ==
Beginning October 1, 2026 healthcare facilities within Maine must mandate and explicitly include sexual orientation and gender identity data - under Maine laws enacted.

== Hate crime law ==
Maine's hate crime law includes both sexual orientation and gender identity. The law provides penalty enhancements for a crime motivated by the victim's actual or perceived sexual orientation or gender identity, amongst other categories.

== Gay and trans panic defense ==
In June 2019, the Maine Legislature passed a bill (passing the House by a vote of 132–1 and the Senate by a vote of 35–0) to ban the gay and trans panic defense, effective from July 1, 2019. The gay panic defense is a legal strategy in which defendants accused of violent offenses claim that unwanted same-sex sexual advances provoked them into reacting by way of self-defense. Occasionally, the defendant may see their charges decrease from murder to the lesser charge of manslaughter.

== Transgender rights ==
In January 2014, the Maine Supreme Court ruled in Doe v. Regional School Unit 26 against an Orono school district which had denied a student the use of a bathroom in alignment with her gender identity.

Since November 2019, Maine residents no longer require certification from a medical provider in order to change the gender marker on their driver's licenses and state ID cards. The Bureau of Motor Vehicles will issue an updated driver's license upon receipt of a completed "Gender Designation Form". A new birth certificate reflecting an applicant's gender identity will be issued by the Maine Department of Health and Human Services following the completion of a notarized affidavit by that applicant. The new birth certificate will record the applicant's requested sex, that being "male", "female" or "X", along with a new first and middle name as designated by the applicant.

Three sex options are available on driver's licenses and state ID cards, that being "male", "female" and "X". The "X" option became available for birth certificates in July 2020. Applicants for an "X" require a declaration from a licensed physician or mental health provider affirming their gender identity. Minors also require parental consent.

Since July 2023, a law implemented legally allows 16 and 17 year olds to access hormone therapy for gender-affirming healthcare within Maine - passed by the Legislature and signed into law by the Governor.

In January 2024, following right wing backlash, Maine Democrats voted unanimously to strike a bill which would've provided sanctuary protections to trans minors.

In April 2024, a bill was passed which “protects, defends and safeguards gender-affirming healthcare explicitly” (alongside abortion).

=== Sports ===
In June 2025, the Maine Senate rejected Legislative Document 233, which would have prohibited transgender women from competing in women's sports if they competed in a school funded by the state. LD 233 was the only piece of legislation out of a series of eight anti-trans bills presented in 2025 to pass in the Maine House of Representatives before its failure.

== Conversion therapy ==
In June 2018, both chambers of the Maine Legislature passed a bill to ban conversion therapy on minors, prior to adjourning sine die. Governor Paul LePage vetoed the bill on July 6, 2018. In his veto message, LePage stated that the bill was "[a] threat to an individual's religious liberty" and added that parents "have the right to seek counsel and treatment for their children from professionals who do not oppose the parents' own religious beliefs. We should not prohibit professionals from providing their expertise to those who seek it for their own personal and basic questions such as, 'How do I deal with these feelings I am experiencing?'". Conversion therapy has been labelled pseudoscience by all major American medical and psychological associations, including the American Medical Association, the American Psychiatric Association and the American Psychological Association. On July 9, 2018, the Maine House of Representatives attempted to override the veto, but failed by a vote of 79–61.

On May 8, 2019, the House passed new legislation to ban conversion therapy on minors, with a vote of 91–46. It later passed the Senate on May 21, 2019 by a vote of 25–9. Governor Janet Mills signed the legislation into law on May 29, 2019. The new law became effective 90 days after the conclusion of the legislative session (i.e. September 17, 2019). It prohibits licensed health care providers from practicing conversion therapy on minors within the state.

== Public opinion ==
A 2017 Public Religion Research Institute poll found that 71% of Maine residents supported same-sex marriage, while 25% were opposed and 4% were unsure.

Public opinion for LGBTQ anti-discrimination laws in Maine
Poll source	Date(s) administered	Sample size	Margin of error	% support	% opposition	% no opinion
Public Religion Research Institute	January 2-December 30, 2019	266	?	76%	19%	5%
Public Religion Research Institute	January 3-December 30, 2018	303	?	69%	26%	5%
Public Religion Research Institute	April 5-December 23, 2017	359	?	75%	19%	6%
Public Religion Research Institute	April 29, 2015-January 7, 2016	460	?	70%	25%	5%

== Summary table ==
Same-sex sexual activity legal	Yes (Since 1977)
Equal age of consent (16)	Yes (Since 1977)
Anti-discrimination laws in all areas	Yes (Since 2005 for sexual orientation and gender identity)
Hate crime law includes sexual orientation and gender identity	Yes
Same-sex marriages	Yes (Since 2012)
Recognition of same-sex couples (e.g. domestic partnership)	Yes (Since 2005)
Joint and stepchild adoption by same-sex couples	Yes
Lesbian, gay and bisexual people allowed to serve openly in the military	Yes (Since 2011)
Transgender people allowed to serve openly in the military	(Banned since 2025 via executive order)
Intersex people allowed to serve openly in the military	(Current DoD policy bans "hermaphrodites" from serving or enlisting in the military)
Right to change legal gender	Yes
Access to IVF for lesbian couples	Yes
Gay and trans panic defence banned	Yes
Conversion therapy banned on minors	Yes
Third gender option	Yes
Surrogacy arrangements legal for gay male couples	Yes
MSMs allowed to donate blood	Yes / No (Since 2020; 3-month deferral period)

== See also ==
- Same-sex marriage in Maine
