= Gender Rights Maryland =

U.S. nonprofit organization

- Gender Rights Maryland logo
- Founded: May 24, 2011
- Type: 501(c)(4) non-profit
- Tax ID no.: 45-2393816
- Location: Laurel, Maryland, US
- Region served: Maryland
- Key people: Dana Beyer, M.D. executive director Sharon Brackett board chair

Gender Rights Maryland was an American civil rights and advocacy organization serving Maryland's transgender community. Gender Rights Maryland's mission is to "aid in the advancement, achievement and protection of the civil rights of transpeople through electoral involvement, grassroots organizing, coalition building and direct legislative advocacy."

The organization's leadership included Dana Beyer, Sharon Brackett, J. Darrell Carrington, Jonathan Shurberg, Mark McLaurin and Matthew Thorn. They have an advisory board, which included Jennifer Finney Boylan, Dan Massey, Alison Gardner, David Fishback, Heath Goisovich, Catherine Hyde, Diego Sanchez, Mark Scurti, Melissa Sklarz, and Lise Van Susteren.

== Gender Rights Maryland Foundation ==
The organization's primary entity, Gender Rights Maryland, Inc., is a 501(c)(4) nonprofit, but the organization also has a 501(c)(3) foundation, called the Gender Rights Maryland Foundation, Inc., with a separate board of directors.

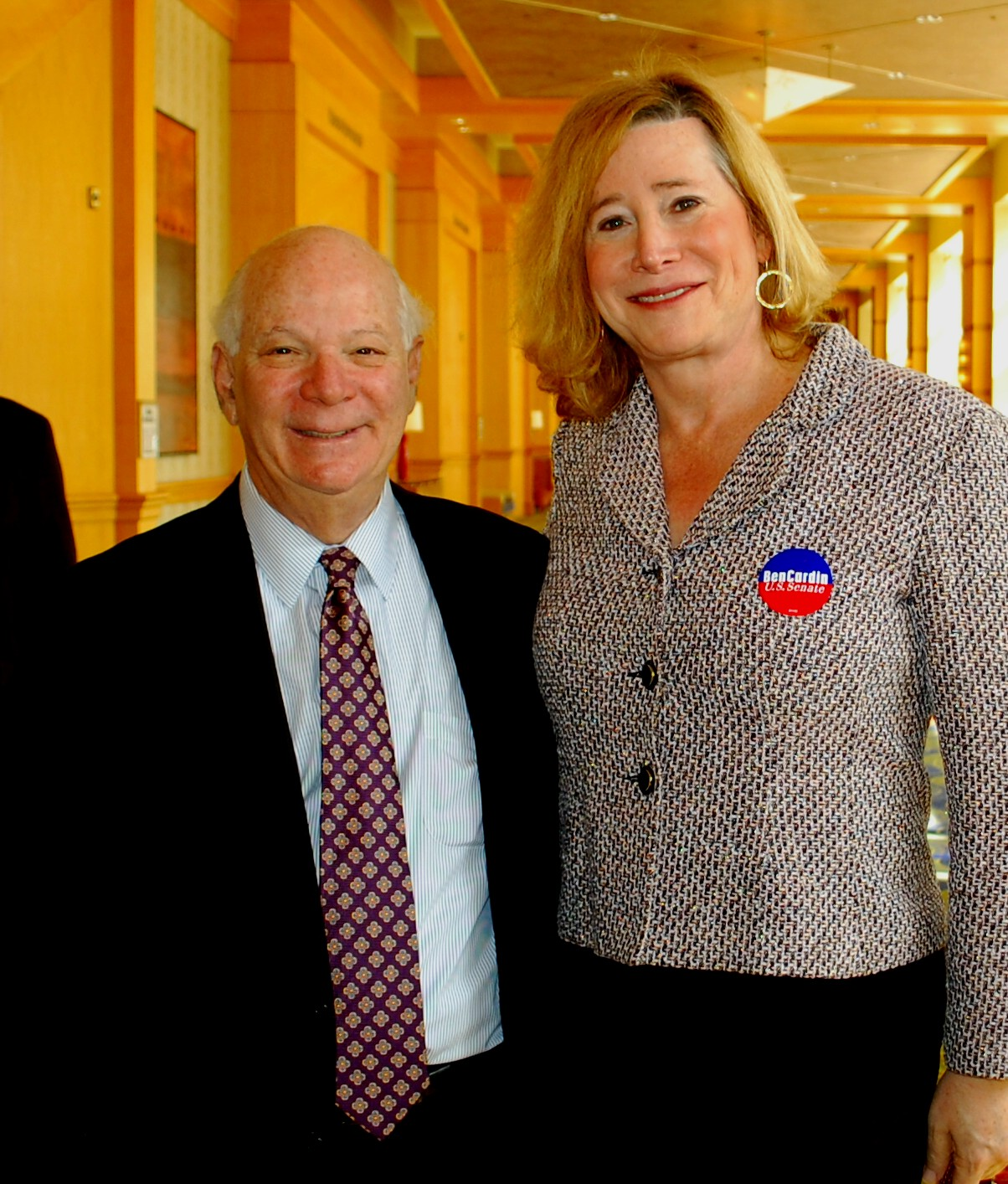
Senator Ben Cardin and Gender Rights Maryland executive director Dana Beyer at a March 2012 event in Rockville, Maryland

== History ==
Gender Rights Maryland was founded in May 2011 with an original goal of passing a comprehensive gender identity anti‐discrimination bill in Maryland by the end of the 2012 legislative session. Its founding board members included Sharon Brackett, Dana Beyer M.D., Donna Cartwright, Caroline Temmermand, and Alex Hickcox.

By the beginning of the 2013 session, the organization which provided the effort to pass comprehensive gender identity anti-discrimination legislation in Maryland via Senate Bill 449, called the Fairness for All Marylanders Act of 2013, was the Maryland Coalition for Trans Equality. Gender Rights Maryland made a decision to leave the Maryland Coalition for Trans Equality in January 2012. The legislation, Senate Bill 212, introduced on their behalf in 2012, by then-senator Jamie Raskin, died in committee without a vote.

Additionally before the 2013 Maryland General Assembly legislative session, Gender Rights Maryland chose to continue an alliance with two of the six local PFLAG chapters in Maryland. In a press release dated November 20, 2012, GRMD executive director Dana Beyer is quoted "We welcome all allies, including those allies who worked for these causes in previous years, to join our alliance in moving these issues forward". Since the departure of GRMD, the Maryland Coalition for Trans Equality has built a coalition of over 40 organizations.

== See also ==
- LGBT rights in Maryland
- List of LGBT rights organizations
