= 2009 Maine Question 1 =

Referendum on same-sex marriage

Question 1: Citizen Initiative
- November 3, 2009
- People's Veto; An Act To End Discrimination in Civil Marriage and Affirm Religious Freedom

Results
Choice	Votes	%
Yes	300,848	52.90%
No	267,828	47.10%
Total votes	568,676	100.00%
County results
Yes
70–80%
60–70%
50–60%
No
60–70%
50–60%

Maine Question 1 was a voter referendum conducted in Maine in the United States in 2009 that rejected a law legalizing same-sex marriage in the state. The measure passed 53–47% on November 3, 2009.

The outcome of the referendum was reversed three years later when voters approved 2012 Maine Question 1, which legalized same-sex marriage in the state again.

== Legislation ==
In January 2009, a bill called "An Act To End Discrimination in Civil Marriage and Affirm Religious Freedom" was introduced in the Maine Legislature. The bill would legalize same-sex marriage and require Maine to recognize other same-sex marriages that were performed out of state. However, the bill also specifies that religious institutions would not be forced into performing same-sex marriages and could deny them if it comes into conflict with their beliefs.

On April 30, 2009, the Maine Senate rejected an amendment to put the issue up for a voter referendum 22–13 and passed the bill 21–14. On May 5, 2009, the Maine House of Representatives passed the bill 89–57, and on the following day, Governor John Baldacci signed the bill into law to take effect 90 days thereafter.

== Ballot question efforts and fundraising ==
On May 7, 2009, opponents of the law filed the necessary paperwork to launch a campaign to put the law up for a vote in the November elections, giving them until 90 days after the legislature adjourned to collect at least 55,087 valid signatures to put the measure on the ballot. In June 2009, Stand for Marriage Maine, the coalition group leading the veto effort, announced it had hired Schubert Flint Public Affairs, which had worked on the Proposition 8 effort in California, to handle public relations for the veto effort. In July 2009, No on 1/Protect Maine Equality was formed to oppose the veto. On September 2, 2009, the secretary of state of Maine verified that the opponents of the law had submitted a sufficient number of valid signatures and certified the ballot question for November.

The National Organization for Marriage (NOM), an anti-same-sex-marriage group, was the primary contributor to Stand For Marriage Maine, the organization that led the "yes on Question 1" campaign. NOM contributed over $1.6 million to Stand For Marriage Maine; by reports as of October 2009, NOM had contributed 63% of that group's funding.

== Polling ==
Question 1 asked: "Do you want to reject the new law that lets same-sex couples marry and allows individuals and religious groups to refuse to perform these marriages?"

- A Yes vote takes away the ability of same-sex couples to marry.
- A No vote keeps the ability of same-sex couples to marry.

Date of opinion poll	Conducted by	Sample size (likely voters)	Yes	No	Undecided	Margin of Error
September 14–16, 2009	Research 2000	600	48%	46%	6%	±4.0%
September 23–27, 2009	Democracy Corps	808	41%	50%	9%	±3.5%
September 30 – October 7, 2009	Pan Atlantic	401	42.9%	51.8%	5.3%	±4.9%
October 16–19, 2009	Public Policy Polling	1130	48%	48%	4%	±2.9%
October 20–22, 2009	Pan Atlantic	400	42%	53%	4%	±4.9%
October 26–28, 2009	Research 2000	600	47%	48%	5%	±4.0%
October 31 – November 1, 2009	Public Policy Polling	1133	51%	47%	2%	±2.9%

== Results ==
The referendum was held on November 3, 2009. Voting "Yes" on the referendum would repeal the law while voting "No" would uphold the law. After the referendum ended, the results showed that 52.9% of voters voted yes on repealing the law while 47.1% of voters voted no.

Question 1: People's Veto An Act To End Discrimination in Civil Marriage and Affirm Religious Freedom
Choice	Votes	%
For	300,848	52.90
Against	267,828	47.10
Total	568,676	100.00

== Post-election ==
=== Reactions from campaigns ===
Just after midnight on election night, consultant Frank Schubert of Stand for Marriage Maine declared, "The institution of marriage has been protected in Maine and across this nation." The No on 1/Protect Maine Equality campaign conceded defeat two hours later. Supporters of same-sex marriage pledged to continue the fight, while opponents said they would work to introduce a constitutional amendment to ban legal recognition of same-sex unions.

=== Campaign finance lawsuits involving referendum proponents ===
In 2009, the Maine Commission on Governmental Ethics and Election Practices voted, 3–2, to investigate the National Organization for Marriage (NOM) for campaign finance violations; the Commission overrode the recommendation of their staff. Maine law required organizations soliciting more than $5,000 for ballot question campaigns to file disclosure reports. NOM had contributed $1.6 million to Stand For Marriage Maine without filing any disclosure reports. NOM filed suit, claiming that Maine's election laws violated the Constitution. The suit was unsuccessful; the district court and the U.S. Court of Appeals for the First Circuit upheld the constitutionality of the challenged Maine election laws, including the disclosure and reporting requirements for political action committees and ballot question committees. The Supreme Court declined to hear further appeals from NOM.

Separately, in 2014, the Commission issued a $50,250 fine to NOM, after investigators determined that the national NOM organization "intentionally set up its fundraising strategy to avoid disclosure laws" when it solicited donations for the clear purpose of aiding the 2009 Maine campaign. The Commission instructed NOM to file a campaign finance disclosure form (which would include the names of donors). NOM unsuccessfully appealed in the state courts, and in August 2015, the Maine Supreme Judicial Court denied NOM's attempt for a stay on releasing the list while its case against a prior Ethics Commission ruling was pending. NOM paid the fine and disclosed its donors list that month.

=== 2012 referendum repealing 2009 referendum ===
On November 6, 2012, another referendum was held on whether to legalize same-sex marriage 53% of voters voted yes, thus overturning the 2009 Maine Question 1 referendum, and marking the first success for same-sex marriage in a ballot measure.

== See also ==
- LGBT rights in Maine
- Same-sex marriage in Maine
- Same-sex marriage in the United States
