= Tom Hucker =

American politician (born 1967)

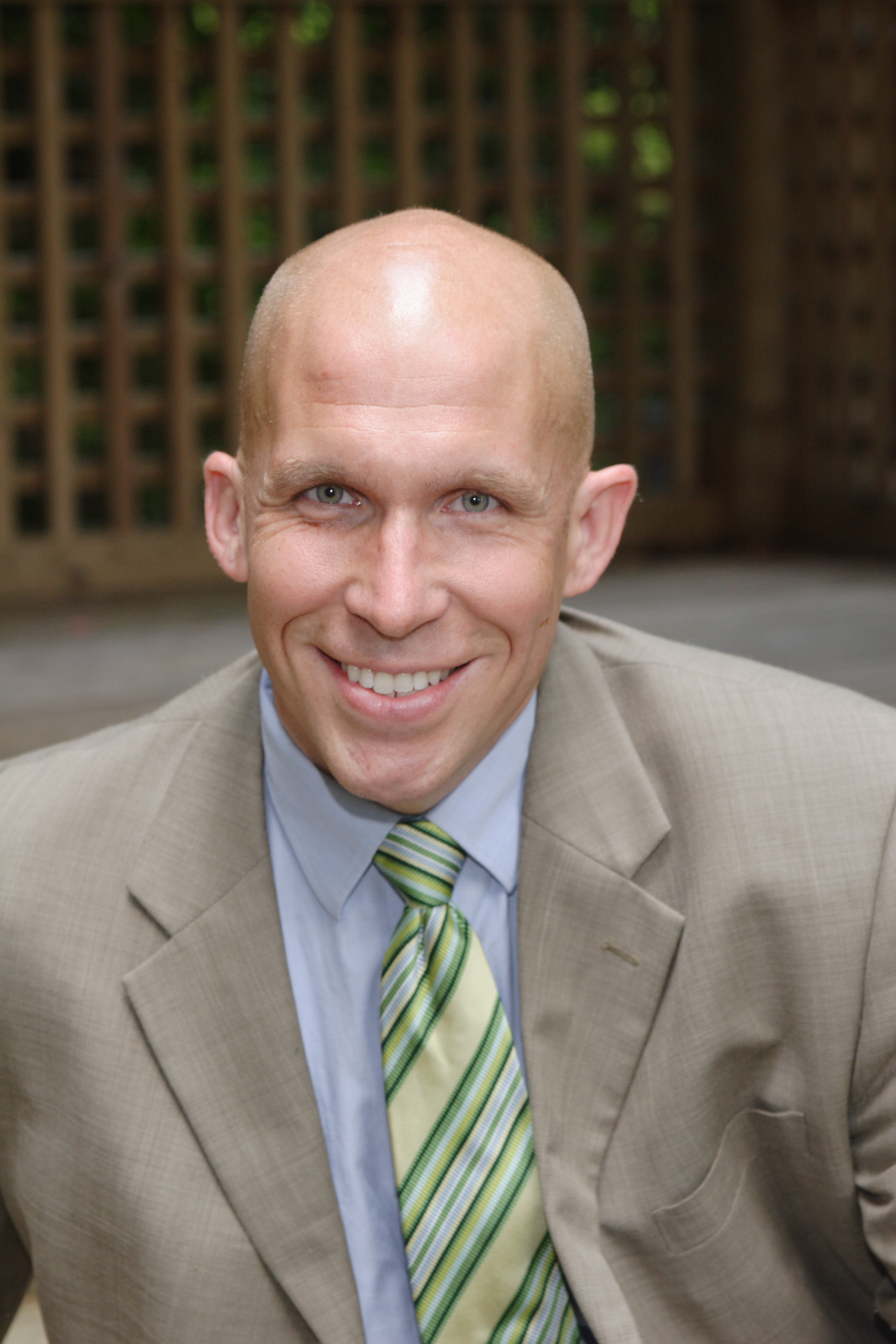

Member of the Montgomery County Council from the 5th district
- In office December 1, 2014 – December 5, 2022
- Preceded by: Cherrie Branson
- Succeeded by: Kristin Mink

Member of the Maryland House of Delegates from the 20th district
- In office January 10, 2007 – December 1, 2014
- Succeeded by: Will Smith

Personal details
- Born: April 9, 1967 (age 59)
- Party: Democratic
- Education: Boston College

Tom Hucker (born April 9, 1967) is an American elected official and a Democrat from the U.S. state of Maryland. He served from 2007 until 2014 as a member of the Maryland House of Delegates from District 20, which included neighborhoods in Takoma Park and Silver Spring. He also previously served as a member of the Montgomery County Council, representing District 5 from 2014 to 2022.

== Background ==
Born in St. Louis, Missouri, Hucker graduated from St. Louis University High School. He won a Gasson Scholarship to Boston College and graduated with honors in 1988, majoring in biology, English, and philosophy. There, he was prominent in efforts to end apartheid and protect the environment. He was twice elected to the Senate of the Undergraduate Government of Boston College, and was elected President of the Boston College MASSPIRG chapter and Treasurer of the statewide MASSPIRG Board of Directors. For his senior thesis, he directed a statewide student lobbying effort to pass legislation strengthening Massachusetts' testing standards for drinking water.

After graduation, Hucker continued his career as a public interest advocate by moving to Washington, D.C. to work for the Fund for Public Interest Research. There, he ran field campaigns for the United States Public Interest Research Group and the Sierra Club to reauthorize the federal Clean Air Act, the Safe Drinking Water Act, the Endangered Species Act, and other federal legislation. As a Regional Campaign Director, he supervised offices in the southern United States and later others along the east coast.

== Career ==
Hucker came to prominence in Maryland politics when he founded Progressive Maryland, an advocacy group, in 2001. The group brought together thousands of individual members in partnership with dozens of the state's largest community, labor, civil rights, and faith-based organizations into a single organization to improve the lives of working families in Maryland. The group combined door-to-door organizing, grassroots leadership development, policy research, and face-to-face advocacy with lawmakers.

In that role, he authored and led successful campaigns to pass the Montgomery County living wage law in 2001, and the Prince George's County living wage law in 2002. Both laws require most county contractors to pay their workers enough to feed their families without food stamps—over 130% of the federal poverty level.

As an advocate in Annapolis, he then authored and led efforts to pass the nation's first statewide living wage bill in 2004, which was vetoed after the legislative session by Gov. Robert Ehrlich. The bill was sponsored by Del. Herman Taylor.

Rather than overriding Ehrlich's veto, House and Senate leaders instead decided to pursue a bill with a much larger impact on low-income workers by raising the state minimum wage, the first time Maryland had passed a minimum wage higher than the federal standard. The increase was estimated to produce a pay raise for 129,000 Maryland workers.

As director of Progressive Maryland, Hucker was recognized with the Friends of Latinos award by the Hispanic Democratic Club of Montgomery County, the Defenders of Justice award from the Maryland Alliance for Justice, and their Public Service award by the League of Korean Americans of Maryland.

Hucker was elected to his first term in the House of Delegates in 2006, after a four-month grassroots campaign. He was endorsed by The Washington Post, which wrote that Hucker "has proven most effective at getting good bills enacted" (September 10, 2006). Hucker was also endorsed by The Gazette, the Montgomery County Education Association and the Montgomery Federation of Teachers, the Maryland League of Conservation Voters, the National Organization for Women, the Maryland Nurses Association, the Fraternal Order of Police, Equality Maryland, the Montgomery County Career Fire Fighters Association/IAFF L. 1664, the Hispanic Democratic Club, the Coalition of Asian Pacific American Democrats (CAPAD-MD), the Alliance of Retired Americans, the Hispanic Democratic Club of Montgomery County, the Progressive Democrats of America, the Metropolitan Washington Council, AFL-CIO, and over 25 other organizations.

In January 2009, Hucker was charged with driving under the influence.

Hucker was elected to represent District 5 on the Montgomery County Council in November 2014 and re-elected in 2018. He is the Chair of the Council’s Transportation and Environment Committee and serves as a member of the Public Safety Committee.

== State legislature ==
Hucker served on the House Economic Matters Committee, and on its Consumer, Workers Compensation, and Insurance Subcommittees. He previously served on the Environmental Matters Committee, and on its Environment, Natural Resources, and Land Use and Ethics Subcommittees.

In 2010, House Speaker Michael E. Busch appointed Hucker the House Chair of the Joint Committee on Federal Relations, and Montgomery County Delegation Chair Brian Feldman appointed him to be the Chair of the Bi-County Affairs Committee, which regulates the Washington Suburban Sanitary Commission and the Maryland-National Capital Park and Planning Commission.

In April 2009, he was appointed to serve on the Climate, Energy, and Environment Policy Committee of the Metropolitan Washington Council of Governments.

In June 2009, the White House appointed Hucker to a new organization, State Legislators for Health Care Reform to provide policy advice and organize support for the President's national health care reform efforts.

In his first General Assembly session, Hucker authored and was co-lead sponsor of the first statewide living wage law in the nation. The legislation received national media attention including this article in The New York Times. The law required most state contractors to pay their workers wages high enough to feed their families without needing food stamps—about 130% of the federal poverty level (HB 430).

In 2009, Hucker passed HB 184 to require the state to finalize a plan to offer universal pre-Kindergarten for all Maryland four-year-olds, and HB 1263 to reduce mercury pollution by requiring auto manufacturers to pay to recycle mercury capsules in older American cars. In 2010, Hucker built on HB 184 by passing HB 350 to require the Maryland State Department of Education to apply for federal Early Education Challenge Grant support to expand pre-kindergarten in Maryland. Also in 2010, he passed HB 1250 to significantly strengthen the state law against SLAPP (Strategic Lawsuits Against Public Participation) suits to protect environmentalists and civic activists from frivolous lawsuits intended to harass and intimidate. He also successfully sponsored HB 1322 to fight human trafficking by requiring all hotels and motels that have been the site of prostitution or human trafficking to post a sign in every hotel room with information on human trafficking and the phone number of the National Human Trafficking Hotline. The bill was a priority of the Maryland State Police, the Montgomery County Police, and the Women Legislators of Maryland.

Hucker has also sponsored legislation to expand health care access, ban arsenic from chicken feed, provide mental health services for veterans, facilitate offshore wind turbines, and ban discrimination in housing.

Hucker was recognized as a 100% Environmental Voter by the Maryland League of Conservation Voters and Environment Maryland.

He also received a 100% rating from Equality Maryland, and has been a vocal advocate for marriage equality.

Hucker was also described as a "Champion of Working Families" by Progressive Maryland and received the highest score in the Maryland General Assembly.

Hucker served as the representative of the Maryland General Assembly on the Board of Directors of Purple Line Now!, an advocacy group organized to protect the environment and expand transit options by building a light rail line from Bethesda through Silver Spring, past the University of Maryland-College Park, and on to New Carrollton, Maryland. The group led a successful organizing campaign that resulted in a decision by Gov. Martin O'Malley that the Purple Line would be a light rail line, following similar decisions by the state legislative delegations, County Executives, and County Councils in both Montgomery and Prince George's Counties.

Because of his years of successful advocacy inside and outside the General Assembly, Hucker also served on the board of directors of the Progressive States Network, a national nonprofit that provides research and strategic advocacy tools to help state legislators to pass progressive policy reforms, including legislation to reward work, strengthen communities, and expand health care access.

Hucker endorsed Sen. Barack Obama for President in 2007, months in advance of the Maryland Presidential Primary, and served on the Maryland for Obama Steering Committee.

== Montgomery County Council ==
Hucker was elected to serve on the Montgomery County Council in November 2014 to represent District 5 and was overwhelmingly re-elected in 2018. In 2019, he was elected by his colleagues to serve as Council Vice President alongside then-Council President Sidney Katz, and in December 2020, he was elected to serve a one-year term as Council President. Hucker serves as the Chair of the Council’s Transportation and Environment Committee and serves as a member of the Public Safety Committee. He also represents the County Council on the Board of Directors for the Metropolitan Washington Council of Governments, and as a Commissioner on the Washington Suburban Transit Commission.

In his first Council term, Hucker fought to reduce the achievement gap, invest in high-quality Pre-K and reduce class sizes. He voted to establish new after-school and full-day Head Start programs in Montgomery County Public Schools. Hucker helped lead the fight to guarantee paid sick leave for all workers in Montgomery County and voted to raise the minimum wage to $15/hour in 2017, which went into effect in 2021. Hucker has introduced and passed legislation aimed at increasing protections for tenants and families. In 2020, he introduced Ezechiel’s Law, a bill that requires landlords to install window guards for free for tenants with children under the age of 10. The bill was unanimously passed and went into effect in 2021. Hucker introduced and the Council unanimously passed Bill 50-20, a bill that requires landlords to monitor and maintain, and eventually replace, mercury service regulators in all residential buildings.

As the Council’s lead for the environment, Hucker passed bills to expand parks, protect drinking water, increase recycling, and expand solar energy. He has advocated for the expansion of public transit in Montgomery County, leading efforts to expand Ride-On Express on US-29 beginning May 2018, proposing and receiving funding for BRT on New Hampshire Avenue and the Burtonsville Access Road. As a member of the Public Safety Committee, he has led efforts to expand the use of body-worn cameras by Montgomery County police officers, including mandating that body cameras be activated when police are dealing with minors in all situations. In 2021, he introduced and passed a bill to expand review and oversight of body-worn camera footage and improve transparency in the reporting of serious police incidents. As Council President, he played a vital role in the county’s Covid-19 recovery, including organizing rallies to call for more emergency relief from the state and leading efforts to stand up a mass vaccination center in Montgomery County.
