= Equality Maryland =

Non-profit organization focused on LGBT social and political movements

- U.S. State of Maryland
- Formation: 1990 as Free State Justice; 2004 renamed Equality Maryland; 2016 Merged with FreeState Legal Project
- Location: Baltimore, Maryland
- Key people: Carrie Evans, executive director
- Website: equalitymaryland.org; freestate-justice.org (successor)

In 2016, Equality Maryland merged with FreeState Legal Project. The organization new name of the merged organization is now FreeState Justice. FreeState Justice has continued to advance the rights of marginalized members of the LGBTQ+ community , while also provided statewide direct legal services.

Equality Maryland (EQMD) was a non-profit organization formerly headquartered in Silver Spring, Maryland, now based in Baltimore. It was at the time, the largest organization in Maryland whose activities focused on advocacy and education with regard to LGBT social and political movements. Its mission included: the passage of laws prohibiting discrimination based on sexual orientation, gender expression, and gender identity; the expansion of Maryland's hate-crimes statute; the increase of domestic partner benefits; the legal recognition of same-sex marriage in Maryland and laws banning the practice of conversion therapy on minors. In 2016, the organization merged with FreeState Legal Project, to form FreeState Justice.

== Structure ==
Equality Maryland's booth at 2007 Capital Pride

The organization began operations in 1990 under the name of Free State Justice, inspired by the Baltimore Justice Campaign that organized the successful amendment to the city's human rights law for gays and lesbians in 1988. The organization was renamed Equality Maryland in 2004. Equality Maryland has three divisions, which share offices, staff, and other resources: two non-profit organizations, each of which has its own mission and board of directors, and a related political action committee.

- Equality Maryland, Inc., is a 501(c)(4) advocacy organization focused on direct and grassroots lobbying to pass laws in to further the organization's goals.
- Equality Maryland Foundation is a 501(c)(3) educational organization whose activities focus on outreach, education, research, community organizing, training, and coalition building.
- Equality PAC is a political action committee which supports pro-LGBT candidates.

The organization is a member of the Equality Federation.

== Achievements ==
=== 2000-2009 ===
- In 2001, EQMD achieved a legislative victory with the passage of the Maryland Anti-Discrimination Act, which banned discrimination in Maryland on the basis of sexual orientation in the areas of housing, employment, lending, and public accommodations. In 2002, the organization succeeded in securing the passage of a Baltimore City ordinance banning discrimination against individuals based on gender identity and expression. One of its primary goals has been the passage of a law prohibiting this kind of discrimination statewide; in 2007, such a bill was introduced in the Maryland General Assembly, but was defeated in a Senate committee.
- In 2004, EQMD devoted resources toward the legal recognition of same-sex relationships. In partnership with the American Civil Liberties Union, it filed a lawsuit (Conaway v. Deane & Polyak) on behalf of nine couples and a widower to overturn the state ban on same-sex marriage. After a victory for plaintiffs in January 2006, the Maryland State's Attorney appealed the decision. The Maryland Court of Appeals heard the case in December 2006; and in September 2007 it was overturned, leaving the statutory ban on same-sex marriage in place (see Same-sex marriage in Maryland).
- In 2005, the Maryland General Assembly passed two Equality Maryland-backed bills, which would afford unmarried opposite-sex and same-sex couples health care decision-making powers and hospital visiting rights involving their domestic partners, but the bills were vetoed by then-Governor Robert Ehrlich.
- In 2007, EQMD launched a statewide visibility campaign, Marylanders For Marriage, to increase public support for same-sex marriage. The campaign, featuring the motto "Civil Marriage is a Civil Right," included the launch of a website, promotion at gay pride festivals and other events, and the distribution of yard signs and bumper stickers across the state.
- In December 2009, EQMD prevented the implementation of a Maryland Motor Vehicle Administration policy that would have required transgender Marylanders to amend their birth certificates in order to update the gender section of their driver's licenses. Making such a change to a driver's license would have then required going through the court system and having undergone genital reconstruction procedures, which LGBT advocates have said "creates significant barriers for individuals to obtain accurate identification reflecting the way they live."

=== 2010 – present ===
- In 2010, EQMD's field team volunteers identified over 10,000 new supporters of gender identity anti-discrimination protections and same-sex marriage throughout the state, and its 2010 election cycle campaign helped to increase LGBT representation in the state legislature, electing seven openly LGBTQ Delegates and Senators, and 73 of their 81 endorsed candidates. Throughout 2010, EQMD increased its grassroots efforts with the launch of action teams across six counties, eventually leading to advances in LGBT rights and protections never before seen in Maryland's history.
- In January 2011, EQMD and LGBT rights supporters helped to introduce a same-sex marriage bill for which the governor expressed his support. In February 2011, the "Religious Freedom and Civil Marriage Protection Act" was approved, 25–21, in the Maryland Senate, but later failed to be voted on in the House of Delegates.
- In January 2012, EQMD heightened its efforts to legalize same-sex marriage by joining a diverse coalition of supporters including Governor Martin O'Malley, 1199SEIU United Healthcare Workers East, American Federation of Labor and Congress of Industrial Organizations, Progressive Maryland, Human Rights Campaign, ACLU of Maryland, Marylanders for Marriage Equality, and church leaders.
- In February 2012, the Maryland General Assembly approved the Civil Marriage Protection Act, and Governor O'Malley signed it into law on March 1, 2012. This new bill included more explicit legal protections for religious institutions, individuals and their programs.
- In March 2012, a poll commissioned by Marylanders for Marriage Equality, of which EQMD is a part, and conducted by Public Policy Polling, found that 52% of Maryland voters would "probably" or "definitely" vote in favor of the same-sex marriage bill if it is on the ballot in November; while 44% of Maryland voters would "probably" or "definitely" oppose it.

== Publications ==
- Heart of the Matter: Maryland's Same-Sex Couples Seek Justice for their Families
- Jumping the Broom: A Black Perspective on Same-Gender Marriage
- Marriage Inequality in the State of Maryland
- What's In a Word? A Religious Perspective on Civil Marriage Equality

== See also ==
- LGBT rights in Maryland
- Same-sex marriage in Maryland
- Respect for Marriage Act
- List of LGBT rights organizations
