= William C. Smith Jr. =

American politician (born 1982)

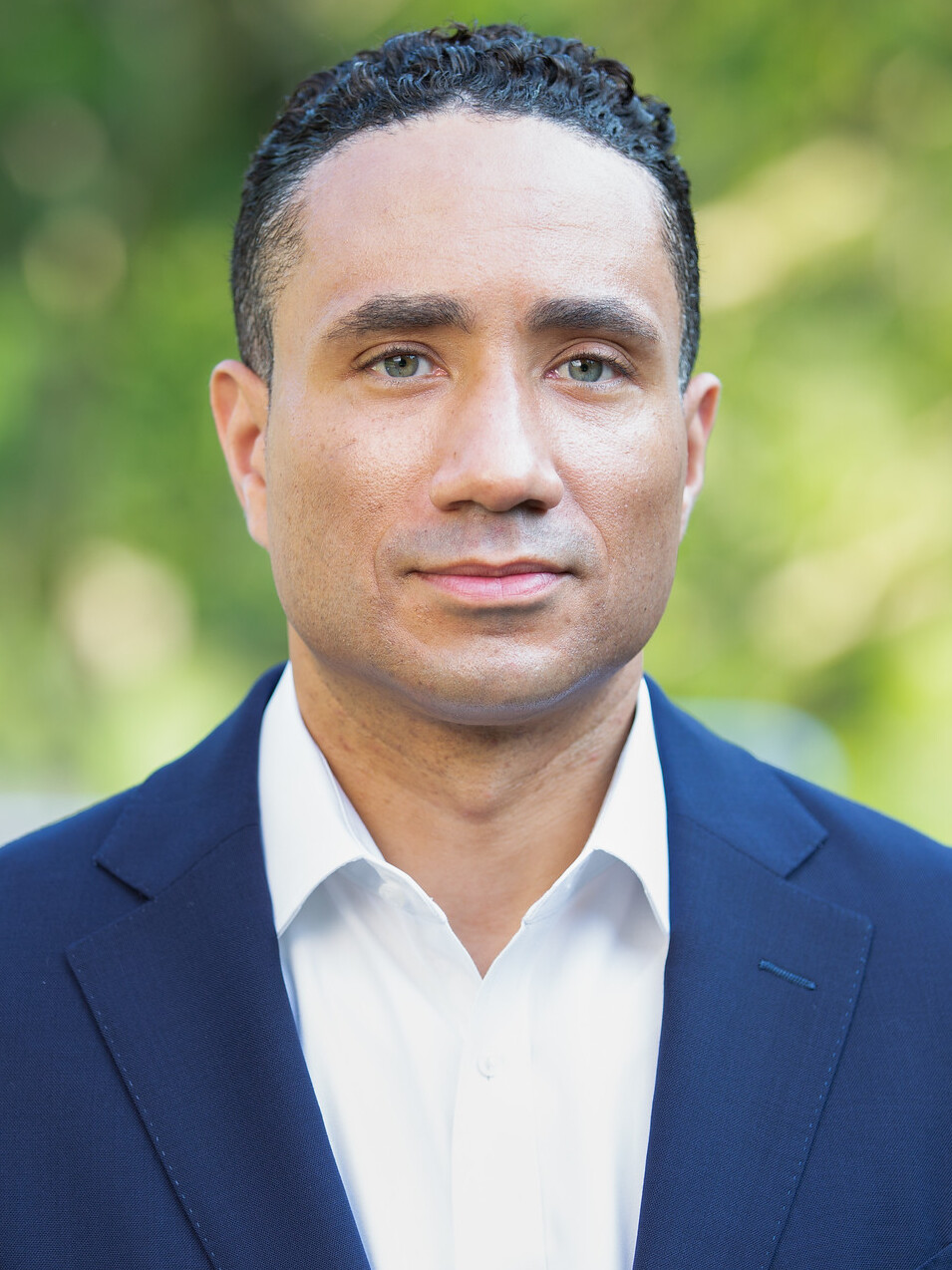

Member of the Maryland Senate from the 20th district
- Incumbent
- Assumed office December 21, 2016
- Appointed by: Larry Hogan
- Preceded by: Jamie Raskin

Member of the Maryland House of Delegates from the 20th district
- In office January 14, 2015 – December 21, 2016 Serving with Sheila E. Hixson, David Moon
- Preceded by: Tom Hucker; Heather Mizeur
- Succeeded by: Jheanelle Wilkins

Personal details
- Born: William Colonel Smith Jr. February 6, 1982 (age 44) Silver Spring, Maryland, U.S.
- Party: Democratic
- Spouse: Camille Fesche
- Children: 2
- Education: College of William and Mary (BA, JD); Johns Hopkins University (MA); National Intelligence University (MS)
- Website: Campaign website

Military service
- Branch/service: United States Navy
- Years of service: 2011–present
- Rank: Lieutenant Commander
- Unit: United States Navy Reserve
- Battles/wars: War in Afghanistan
- Smith's voice Smith on the George Floyd protests and subsequent criminal justice reforms. Recorded June 11, 2020

William Colonel Smith Jr. (born February 6, 1982) is an American politician who is a member of the Maryland Senate representing District 20 since 2016. He previously represented the district in the Maryland House of Delegates from 2015 to 2016.

== Early life and education ==
William Colonel Smith Jr. was born at the Holy Cross Hospital in Silver Spring, Maryland, on February 6. 1982. He graduated from the Barrie School and later attended the College of William & Mary, earning a Bachelor of Arts degree in government in 2004 and his Juris Doctor degree in 2009; Johns Hopkins University, earning a Master of Arts degree in government in 2006; and National Intelligence University, earning a Master of Science of Strategic Intelligence degree in 2018.

Smith enlisted in the military following the September 11 attacks. He was deployed to Afghanistan with the 1st Armored Division as part of Operation Resolute Support from March to October 2019, attaining the rank of lieutenant commander in the U.S. Navy Reserve. While deployed, Smith assisted with the country's 2019 presidential election and monitored peace talks between the Taliban and the United States in Doha, Qatar.

== Career ==
Smith chaired the Montgomery County Community Development Block Grant Board from 2004 to 2008, afterwards chairing the county Victim Services Advisory Board until 2012. He served the director of the Homeland Security Advisory Council in the U.S. Department of Homeland Security from 2011 to 2013. At the same time, Smith was the second vice president of the Montgomery County NAACP later serving on the group's executive committee.

In 2005, Smith started Youth Achieve Inc., a youth development nonprofit. As of 2023, he currently serves on the board of directors of multiple organizations, including Gandhi Brigade, the GapBuster Learning Center, and Impact Silver Spring.

Smith worked as an attorney for the Federal Practice Group from 2014 to 2016, and for the Solomon Law Firm since 2018.

=== Maryland House of Delegates ===
Smith ran for the Maryland House of Delegates in 2014, seeking to succeed state delegates Heather Mizeur and Tom Hucker, who both announced campaigns for higher office. During the Democratic primary, he ran on a slate with state senator Jamie Raskin, state delegate Sheila E. Hixson, and candidate David Moon. The slate won the Democratic primary in June, and later won the general election in November 2014.

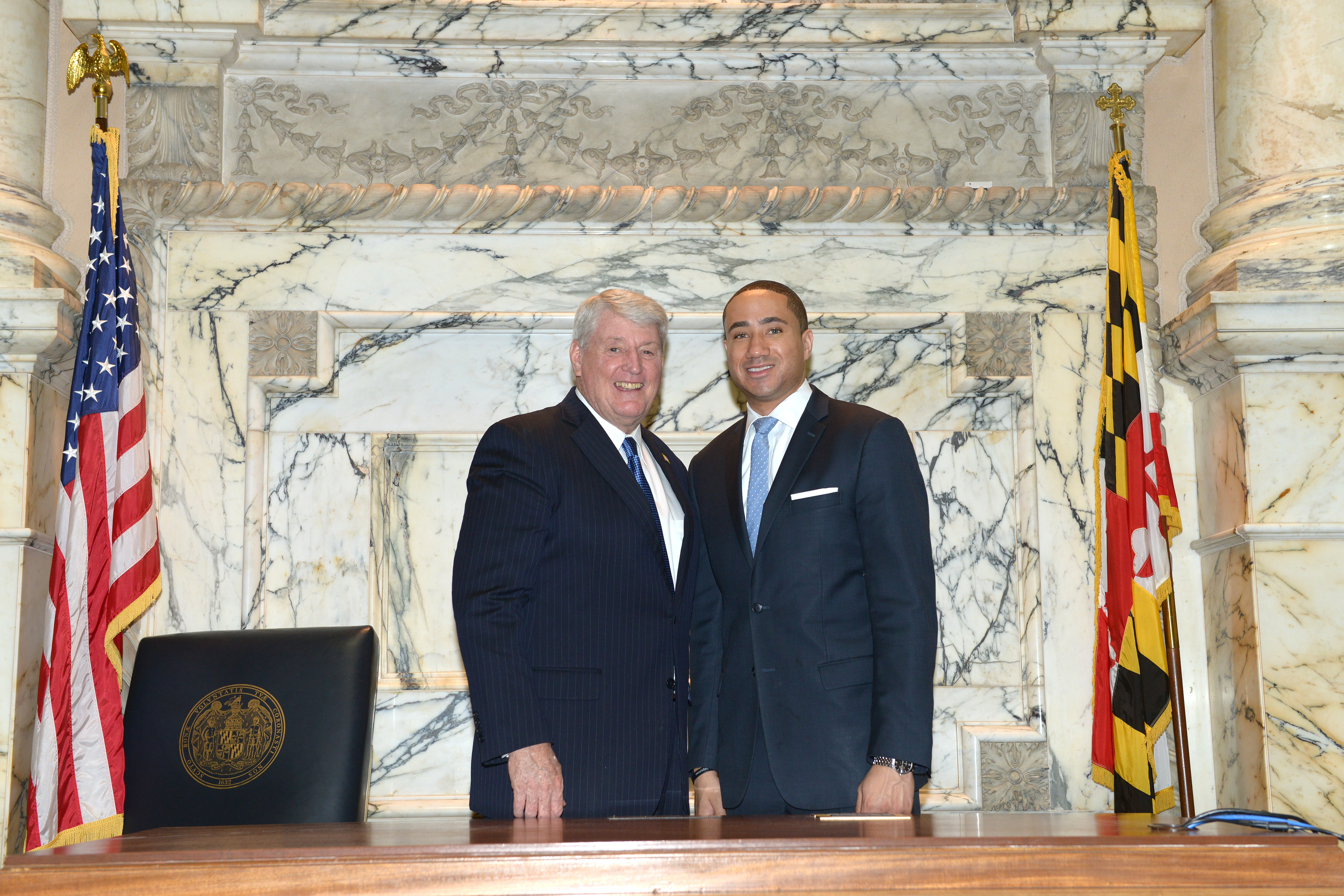
House Speaker Michael E. Busch swears Smith into the Maryland House of Delegates, 2015

Smith was sworn into the Maryland House of Delegates on January 14, 2015. During his short tenure, he was a member of the House Judiciary Committee, serving in its criminal justice and family law subcommittees.

=== Maryland Senate ===
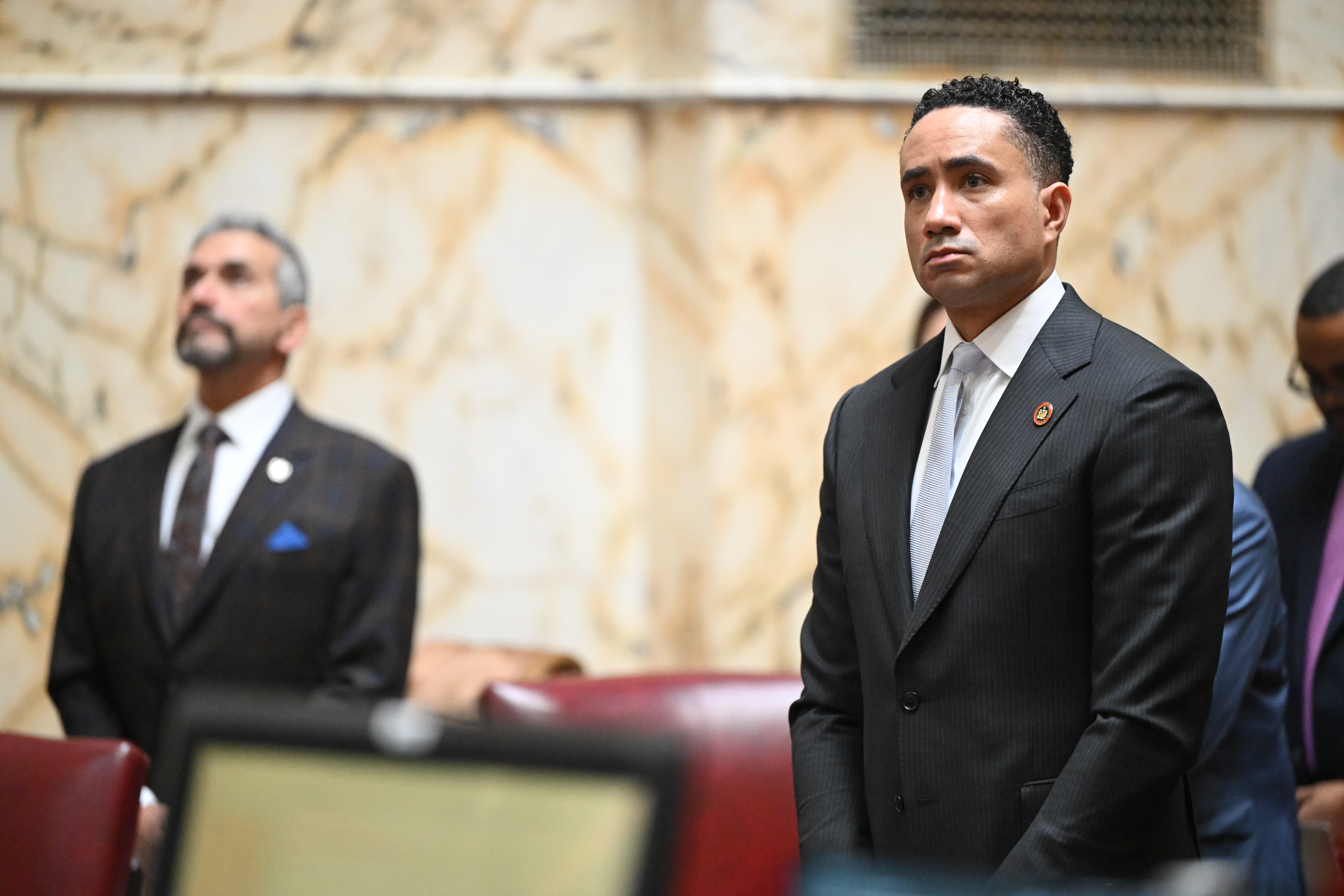
Smith on the floor of the Maryland Senate, 2026

In November 2016, after state senator Jamie Raskin resigned following his election to Congress, Smith applied to serve the remainder of Raskin's term in the Maryland Senate. The Montgomery County Democratic Central Committee voted 19–8 to nominate Smith over state delegate David Moon to fill the vacancy. He was appointed to the seat by Governor Larry Hogan on December 13, 2016.

Smith was sworn into the Maryland Senate on December 21, 2016, and was elected to a full four-year term in 2018. He is the first Black person to represent Montgomery County in the Maryland Senate. Smith has served in the Senate Judicial Proceedings Committee during his entire tenure. In July 2018, he was named vice chair to the committee, and in December 2019, Senate President Bill Ferguson announced that he would appoint Smith to chair the committee following the resignation of Robert Zirkin. In February 2022, Smith delivered the Democratic response to Governor Hogan's State of the State Address.

In January 2020, Smith endorsed South Bend, Indiana mayor Pete Buttigieg in the 2020 Democratic Party presidential primaries. He unsuccessfully ran to be a delegate to the 2020 Democratic National Convention pledged to Buttigieg.

== Political positions ==
Maryland Matters has described Smith as a progressive, noting that he represents the most progressive legislative district in the state.

=== Crime and policing ===
During the 2019 legislative session, Smith introduced a bill requiring drunk driving offenders to use ignition interlocks after their first offense.

In February 2020, Smith introduced a legislative package to address the public safety crisis in Baltimore, including bills to increase crackdowns on and incentives for reporting illegal firearms, expanded supervision of residents on parole, and improved information-sharing between local police departments. The bills were seen as the legislature's response to a trio of crime bills introduced by Governor Larry Hogan, which Smith opposed for increasing mandatory minimum sentences for certain crimes. Following negotiations between Hogan and legislative leaders, the bills passed with amendments including some aspects of Hogan's crime bills, including provisions to increase penalties for illegal firearm penalties, and became law.

In June 2020, following the murder of George Floyd and subsequent protests, Smith proposed a package of bills on police accountability and reform, which included bills to repeal the Law Enforcement Officers' Bill of Rights, establish an independent investigative body to handle police misconduct cases, and Anton's Law. The legislative package was introduced during the 2021 legislative session, during which all of its bills passed, but were vetoed by Governor Larry Hogan; legislators overrode Hogan's veto shortly thereafter.

In late 2021, Smith endorsed bills that would to end the practice of charging juveniles as adults in criminal court and another to prohibit police from questioning kids without their parents' consent.

In January 2022, Smith criticized Governor Hogan's "Refund the Police" initiative, accusing him of engaging in "bumper-sticker sloganeering" and rebuking his claims that multiple jurisdictions in the state were cutting police funding.

During the 2023 legislative session, Smith introduced legislation that would give the attorney general of Maryland sole prosecutorial power over cases involving police-involved deaths. The bill passed and was signed into law by Governor Wes Moore.

In April 2023, during debate on legislation to raise the age for legal gun possession to 21, Smith objected to a proposed amendment that would allow someone who completed a sentence for illegal gun possession to apply to convert their sentence to probation before judgment after completing a firearms training course. The amendment initially adopted in a 27–16 vote, but the amendment was later withdrawn from the bill in a 28–14 vote.

During the 2026 legislative session, Smith supported proposals to raise the minimum age to automatically charge minors as adults from 14-years-old to 16-years-old and repeal automatic charging for less-serious crimes, including abduction, robbery, third-degree sex offense, and regulated firearm offenses.

=== Education ===
Smith supports the Blueprint for Maryland's Future. During the 2017 legislative session, Smith introduced a bill that would ban school suspensions and expulsions in prekindergarten. The bill passed and became law.

=== Electoral reform ===
In February 2026, Smith declined to say how he would vote on a bill to redraw Maryland's congressional districts to improve the Democratic Party's chances of winning Maryland's 1st congressional district, but said there was support for mid-decade redistricting in his district. He also predicted that the bill to do so would not move out of the Senate Rules Committee, citing a lack of support for mid-decade redistricting in the Senate Democratic caucus.

=== Environment ===
In February 2021, Smith wrote to Maryland Transportation Secretary Greg Slater and Environment Secretary Ben Grumbles to express concerns with proposed changes to the state's vehicle emissions testing program. In April, he introduced an amendment to the Clean Cars Act to block the proposed changes, which was added to the bill by the Maryland Senate.

=== Gun policy ===
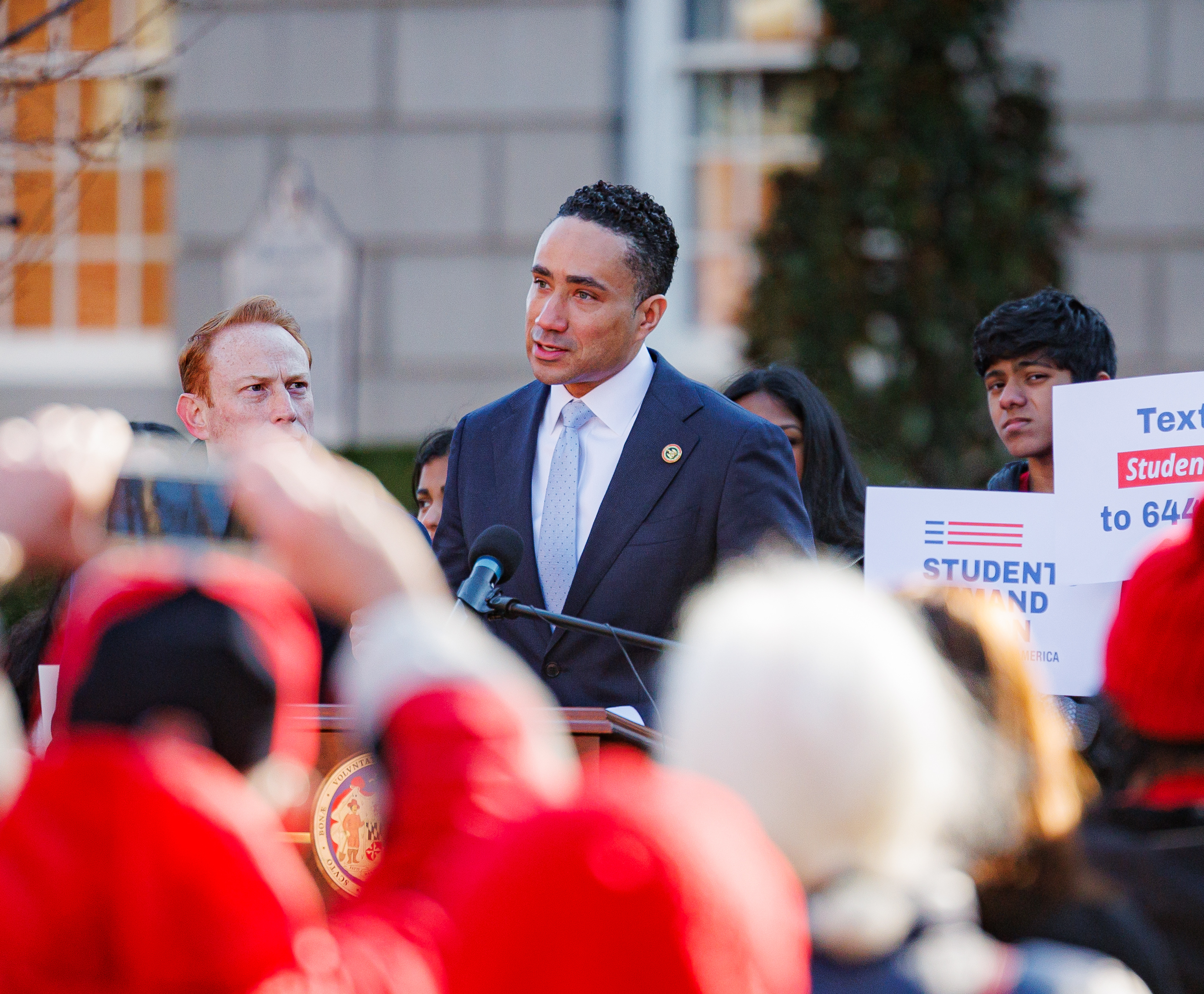
Smith speaks at a Moms Demand Action rally, 2025

During the 2021 legislative session, Smith voted to override Governor Larry Hogan's veto of a bill that would require background checks to purchase long guns.

In July 2022, Smith condemned Governor Hogan's decision to lift restrictions on open carry in Maryland following the U.S. Supreme Court's decision in New York State Rifle & Pistol Association, Inc. v. Bruen. During the 2023 legislative session, he introduced legislation to strengthen the state's safe-storage laws, which passed and was signed into law by Governor Wes Moore.

=== Health care ===
During the 2019 legislative session, Smith introduced the End-of-Life Option Act, which would provide palliative care to terminally ill patients. The bill failed to pass out of the Maryland Senate after state senator Obie Patterson refused to cast a vote on it, causing it to die in a tied 23–23 vote.

=== Housing ===
During the 2020 legislative session, Smith introduced the HOME Act, which banned discrimination in housing on the basis of source of income. The bill passed and became law.

In 2021, Smith introduced legislation that would prohibit landlords from evicting tenants without providing a "just cause" and establish a statewide rental assistance fund. In May 2021, he signed onto a letter calling on Governor Larry Hogan to use federal rent relief funding to support an unfunded state law allowing low-income tenants access to legal representation on eviction cases.

In February 2023, following a gas explosion at Flower Branch Apartments in Silver Spring, Maryland, that killed seven and injured 68 residents, Smith said he would put Governor Wes Moore's appointment of Juan Alvarado to the Maryland Public Service Commission on hold, saying that he wanted to probe Alvarado's role in the investigations following the Flower Branch emergency. Alvarado withdrew his nomination a few days later.

=== Immigration ===
During the 2021 legislative session, Smith introduced the TRUST Act, a bill that would prohibit police from asking detainees about their immigration status and limit governments' ability to sharing data with U.S. Immigration and Customs Enforcement (ICE), and the Dignity Not Detention Act, which would prohibit counties from holding contracts with ICE. Both bills were vetoed by Governor Hogan, but legislators voted to override his veto during its special legislative session later that year.

During the 2025 legislative session, Smith supported the Maryland Values Act, which would have prohibited counties from entering into 287(g) programs with ICE. However, on the final day of the session, the Senate Judicial Proceedings Committee removed provisions that would have banned such agreements, with Smith telling Bolts that he believed passing the bill would result in retaliatory actions from the Trump administration. After the Trump administration slashed federal funding to Maryland anyway, he supported a bill banning 287(g) contracts in Maryland during the 2026 legislative session.

=== Israel ===
In November 2023, Smith and eight other state senators signed a joint letter that threatened to defund immigrants rights group CASA de Maryland because it had called for an immediate ceasefire in the Gaza war and condemned the "utilization of US tax dollars to promote the ongoing violence."

=== Marijuana ===
During the 2019 legislative session, Smith introduced legislation to legalize recreational cannabis in Maryland.

=== Social issues ===
In December 2018, Smith signed onto an amicus brief in the U.S. Supreme Court case American Legion v. American Humanist Association defending the cross-shaped Peace Cross monument in Bladensburg, Maryland.

During the 2019 legislative session, Smith introduced legislation that would allow residents to designate their gender as "X" on driver's licenses. The bill passed and became law. In 2025, Smith introduced the Carlton R. Smith Act, a bill to remove a criminal penalty for intentionally transferring HIV to another person.

In 2020, Smith introduced the CROWN Act, which would ban discrimination based on hairstyle. The bill passed and became law.

During the 2022 legislative session, Smith introduced legislation that would prohibit the prosecution of individuals who come to Maryland to receive abortion services. The bill was reintroduced in 2023 following the Dobbs v. Jackson Women's Health Organization decision, during which it passed and was signed into law.

In March 2023, Smith testified in support of the Maryland Child Victims Act, a bill to abolish the statute of limitations on child sexual assault cases. During the 2026 legislative session, he introduced a bill that would remove attorney fee caps on lawsuits filed under the Child Victims Act.

During the 2026 legislative session, Smith introduced a bill to investigate conditions at the House of Reformation and Instruction for Colored Children in Cheltenham, citing the rediscovery of a grave site containing an estimated 230 youths buried in unmarked graves.

=== Transportation ===
Smith supports the Purple Line and Red Line rail line projects, and has criticized delays toward the Purple Line's completing, warning in June 2020 that future delays would be "devastating for the community". During the 2020 legislative session, he introduced legislation to provide tax credits to small businesses affected by the Purple Line's construction.

Smith opposes proposals to widen Interstate 270 and the Capital Beltway. During the 2019 legislative session, he introduced legislation that would give counties veto power over state transportation projects within their jurisdiction.

== Personal life ==
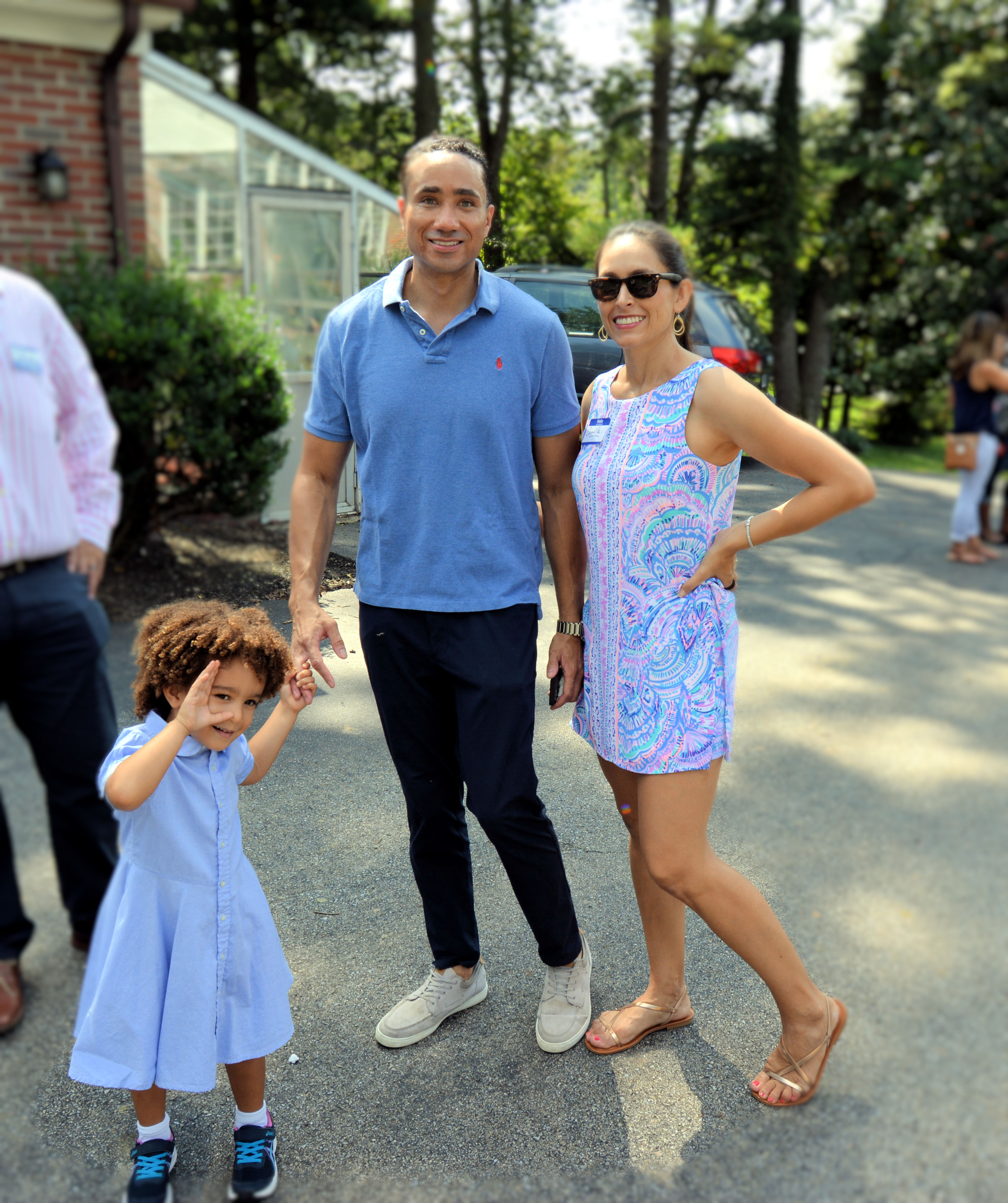
Smith with his wife and daughter, 2021

Smith is married to his wife, Camille Fesche, who is a lobbyist in the Maryland General Assembly for the law firm Rifkin Weiner Livingston, LLC. Together, they have two daughters. He is Catholic.

Smith's decorations and medals include the National Defense Service Medal, the Global War on Terrorism Service Medal, the Joint Meritorious Unit Award, and the Joint Service Achievement Award.

== Electoral history ==
Maryland House of Delegates District 20 Democratic primary election, 2014
Party	Candidate	Votes	%
Democratic	Sheila E. Hixson (incumbent)	9,135	24.5
Democratic	David Moon	6,959	18.7
Democratic	William C. Smith Jr.	6,006	16.1
Democratic	Will Jawando	5,620	15.1
Democratic	Darian Unger	4,296	11.5
Democratic	Jonathan Shurberg	2,997	8.0
Democratic	Justin W. Chappell	1,076	2.9
Democratic	D'Juan Hopewell	778	2.1
Democratic	George Zokle	397	1.1

Maryland House of Delegates District 20 election, 2014
Party	Candidate	Votes	%
Democratic	Sheila E. Hixson (incumbent)	23,519	31.6
Democratic	William C. Smith Jr.	21,989	29.6
Democratic	David Moon	21,646	29.1
Green	Daniel S. Robinson	6,801	9.1
Write-in		407	0.5

Maryland Senate District 20 Democratic primary election, 2018
Party	Candidate	Votes	%
Democratic	Will Smith (incumbent)	16,896	100.0

Maryland Senate District 20 election, 2018
Party	Candidate	Votes	%
Democratic	Will Smith (incumbent)	42,069	90.8
Republican	Dwight Patel	4,236	9.1
Write-in		40	0.1

Maryland Senate District 20 election, 2022
Party	Candidate	Votes	%
Democratic	Will Smith (incumbent)	42,069	98.8
Write-in		422	1.2
