= David Moon (politician) =

American politician (born 1979)

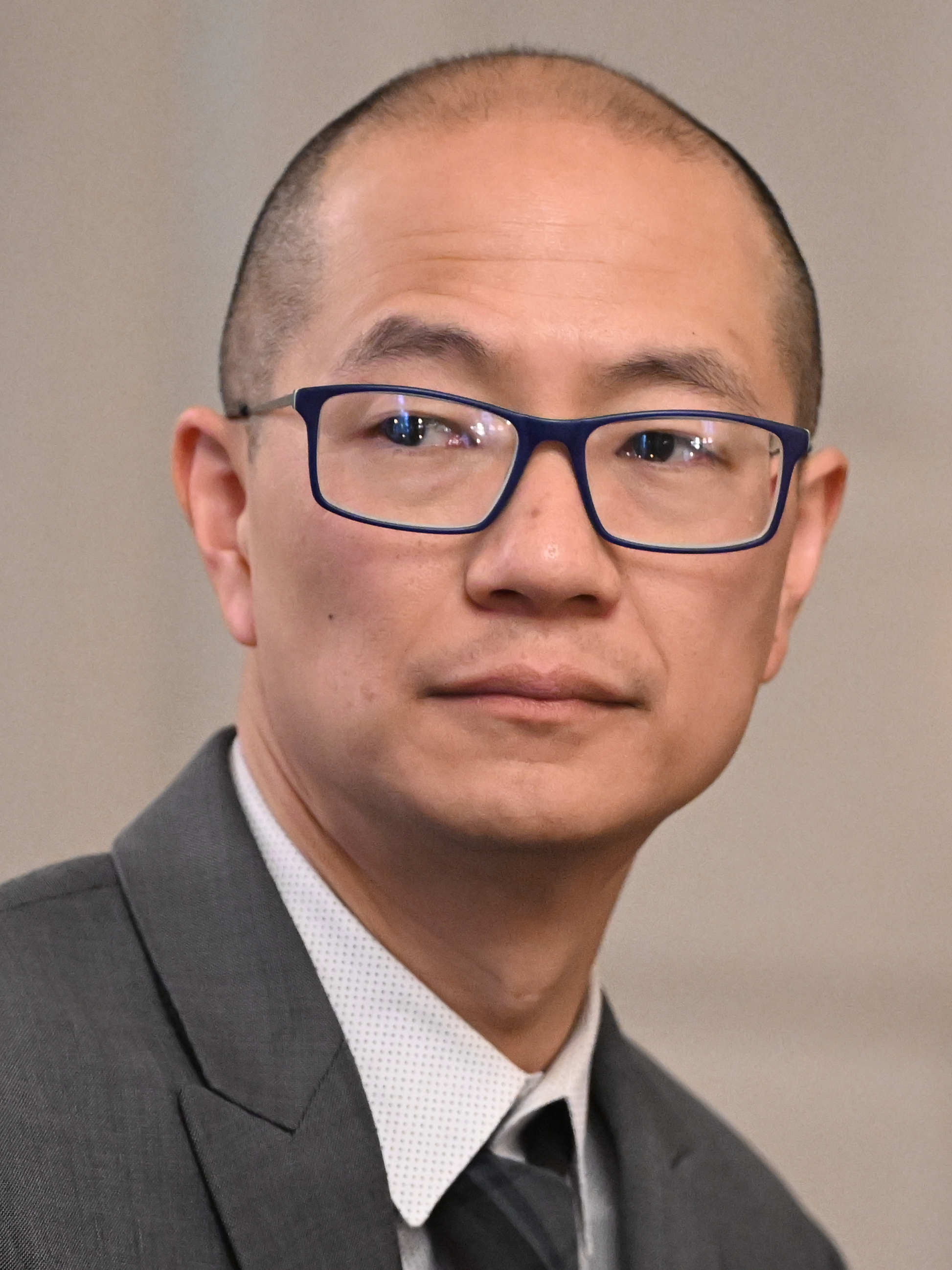
- Moon in 2026

Majority Leader of the Maryland House of Delegates
- Incumbent
- Assumed office May 17, 2023
- Whip: Jazz Lewis; Ashanti Martinez
- Preceded by: Marc Korman

Member of the Maryland House of Delegates from the 20th district
- Incumbent
- Assumed office January 14, 2015 Serving with Jheanelle Wilkins, Lorig Charkoudian
- Preceded by: Heather Mizeur

Personal details
- Born: David Hyon Moon; January 28, 1979 (age 47) Takoma Park, Maryland, U.S.
- Party: Democratic
- Spouse: Melinda Coolidge
- Education: Tufts University (BA); American University (JD)
- Moon's voice Moon on anti-Asian racism in the United States. Recorded March 26, 2021

David Hyon Moon (born January 28, 1979) is an American activist, lawyer, and politician who has served as a member of the Maryland House of Delegates representing the 20th district in Montgomery County, Maryland, since 2015. Since 2023, he has served as the Majority Leader of the Maryland House of Delegates.

Born and raised in Montgomery County, Maryland, Moon graduated from Tufts University and the American University Washington College of Law. He began his career as the chief operating officer of FairVote before becoming the program director of Demand Progress. He worked as the campaign manager for Jamie Raskin and Nancy Navarro, started his own consulting firm, and ran a political blog focused primarily on Maryland politics. He was elected to the Maryland House of Delegates in 2014, becoming one of the first two Korean-American members of the Maryland General Assembly, along with Mark S. Chang.

== Early life and education ==
Moon was born in Takoma Park, Maryland, to Korean immigrants. He graduated from Walt Whitman High School. He later attended Tufts University, where he earned a B.A. degree in sociology and psychology in 2001, and the American University Washington College of Law, where he earned a J.D. degree in 2004.

== Political career ==
=== Early political career ===
Moon has worked for various activist groups, including as the chief operating officer of FairVote from 2004 to 2009 and as the program director for Demand Progress since 2011. He also worked as the campaign manager for Jamie Raskin's 2006 campaign for the Maryland Senate and Nancy Navarro's 2009 campaign for the Montgomery County Council. In 2010, Moon opened his own consulting firm, Moon Strategies. In 2011, Moon founded the blog Maryland Juice, which focused primarily on Maryland politics. In August 2013, OR Books published Hacking Politics, a book Moon co-wrote with Patrick Ruffini and David Segal.

In 2013, Moon launched a campaign for the Maryland House of Delegates, seeking to succeed Heather Mizeur and Tom Hucker, both of whom had sought other office in 2014. During the Democratic primary, he was endorsed by state senator Jamie Raskin, various local labor unions and organizations, including the Maryland League of Conservation Voters, CASA de Maryland, and NARAL Pro-Choice Maryland. Moon also ran on a slate alongside Raskin, state delegate Sheila E. Hixson, and William C. Smith Jr. He won the Democratic primary on June 24, 2014, receiving 18.5 percent of the vote, and later won the general election.

=== Maryland House of Delegates ===
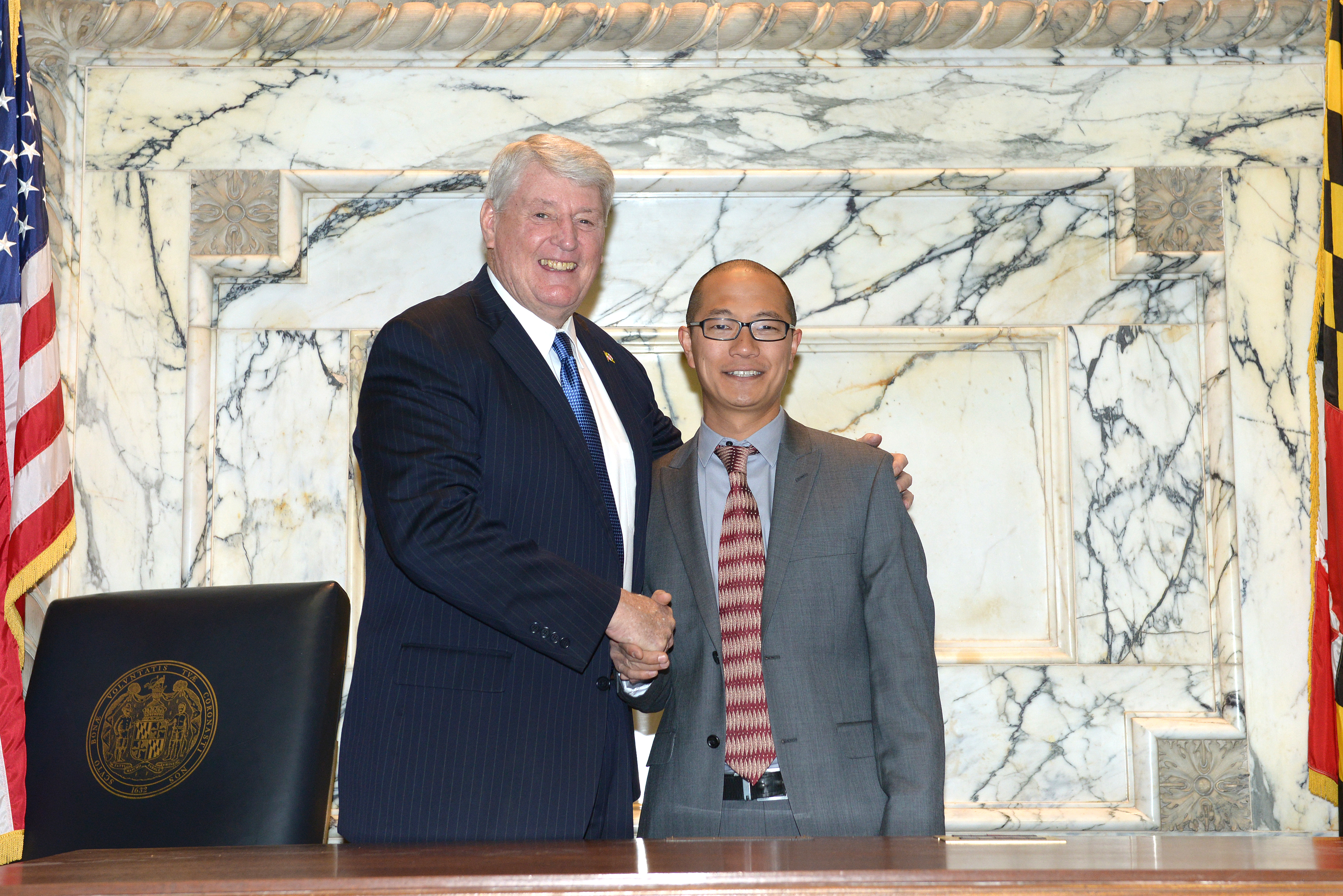
House Speaker Michael E. Busch swears Moon into the Maryland House of Delegates, 2015

Moon was sworn into the Maryland House of Delegates on January 14, 2015, becoming the first Korean-Americans elected to the Maryland General Assembly alongside Mark S. Chang. He has served on the Judiciary Committee during his entire tenure, including as the committee's vice chair from 2021 to 2023. Moon also became known for defending bills during floor debates, especially criminal justice bills. In May 2023, House Speaker Adrienne A. Jones named Moon as House Majority Leader, succeeding Marc Korman, who had been appointed as chair of the House Environment and Transportation Committee.

In December 2016, following state senator Jamie Raskin's election to the United States House of Representatives, Moon applied to serve the remainder of Raskin's term in the Maryland Senate. His candidacy was backed by the local Service Employees International Union, CASA de Maryland, and Progressive Maryland. The Montgomery County Democratic Central Committee voted 19–8 to nominate delegate William C. Smith Jr. to fill the vacancy.

== Political positions ==
=== Criminal justice ===
During the 2016 legislative session, following the killing of Freddie Gray, Moon introduced legislation that would make it a crime for police not to seek medical help for a detainee that requests it. He later withdrew the bill, citing unproductive legislative debate. During the 2021 legislative session, he spoke in support of the Maryland Police Accountability Act, a police transparency and accountability reform package. In 2022, Moon introduced legislation that would require all law enforcement agencies to wear body-worn cameras by 2025. During the 2023 legislative session, he introduced legislation to prohibit the Maryland State Police from using facial-recognition technology.

During the 2019 legislative session, Moon introduced a bill to repeal attempted suicide as a criminal offense.

=== Environment ===
In 2017, Moon led efforts to pressure the Hogan administration to implement tougher water pollution regulations on the state's coal-fired power plants.

In January 2019, Moon authored a letter to the Maryland Board of Public Works asking the board to reject a Columbia Gas Transmission proposal to build an oil pipeline in Washington County.

In September 2022, Moon authored a letter in support of a proposed U.S. Energy Department rule that would increase the efficiency level of gas furnaces to 95 percent.

=== Gun control ===
During the 2018 legislative session, following the 2017 Las Vegas shooting that left 60 dead and about 867 injured, Moon introduced a bill to ban bump stocks. The bill passed and was signed into law by Governor Larry Hogan. He also criticized bills that would allow schools to arm teachers.

=== Health care ===
During the 2023 legislative session, Moon introduced a bill to audit the state's behavioral health and drug treatment system to identify ways to support community-based preventative services. The bill passed and was signed into law by Governor Wes Moore.

In February 2025, Moon supported a bill that would allow the Prescription Drug Affordability Board to place upper price limits on prescription drugs. While explaining his vote for the bill, he rose to denounce Republican criticisms that the bill would lead to drug price shortages and limit development of life-saving drugs as hypocritical, pointing to mass layoffs at the National Institutes of Health and the Food and Drug Administration by "President Elon Musk and Vice President Donald Trump", prompting boos from Republican lawmakers and a subsequent partisan shouting match between House Speaker Adrienne A. Jones and about a half-dozen Republican legislators.

=== Immigration ===
During the 2021 legislative session, Moon supported the Dignity Not Detention Act, which prohibits jurisdictions from contracting with U.S. Immigration and Customs Enforcement (ICE) to detain undocumented people in local jails. During the 2025 and 2026 legislative sessions, he supported the Maryland Values Act, which would have prohibited counties from entering into 287(g) programs with ICE.

During the 2026 legislative session, Moon introduced a bill that would allow individuals to "digitally unmask" anonymous ICE agents involved in violent or unconstitutional misconduct. He also supported the Community Trust Act, which would require ICE to present a judicial warrant to hold someone.

=== Marijuana ===
Moon supports the legalization of recreational marijuana in Maryland, repeatedly introducing bills to legalize and tax its sale. In 2015, he introduced a bill that would exclude possessing 10 grams or less of marijuana as a parole violation. Moon was appointed to the Marijuana Legalization Work Group by House Speaker Michael E. Busch in 2019, where he helped develop the state's framework for marijuana legalization. In 2021 and 2023, Moon introduced bills that would decriminalize the possession of marijuana paraphernalia.

=== National politics ===
In December 2014, Moon joined efforts to draft U.S. Senator Elizabeth Warren in the 2016 United States presidential election. In November 2019, he endorsed Warren in the 2020 Democratic Party presidential primaries, and later ran for convention delegate to the 2020 Democratic National Convention pledged to Warren.

In September 2018, Moon signed a letter calling for a county investigation into sexual assault allegations made against U.S. Supreme Court nominee Brett Kavanaugh. Montgomery County law enforcement officials declined to investigate the matter unless the alleged victim filed a complaint.

In July 2025, amid reports that Republicans were looking at redrawing the congressional maps of Texas and Missouri to benefit Republicans in the 2026 midterm elections, Moon said that he would introduce legislation during the 2026 legislative session that would allow Maryland to redraw its congressional districts "upon any other U.S. State adopting a new congressional map outside of the regular decennial census period". He also announced plans to introduce a bill that would create a treaty among states to limit redistricting to once every decade, which would need to be ratified by all 50 states to take effect. In February 2026, Moon supported a congressional redistricting plan advanced by the Governor's Redistricting Advisory Commission that would redraw Maryland's 1st congressional district to improve the Democratic Party's chances of winning it, framing it as a response to mid-decade redistricting actions taken by various red states.

In April 2026, Moon criticized the U.S. Supreme Court's decision in Louisiana v. Callais, calling it the "latest in a series of these hugely undemocratic and regressive moves" and citing the ruling as a reason Maryland should redraw its congressional districts.

=== Social issues ===
While serving as a program director for Demand Progress, Moon led protests against the Stop Online Piracy Act and related bills.

During the 2015 legislative session, Moon introduced legislation that would require special elections to fill vacancies in the United States Senate, stripping the governor's ability to appoint a replacement to the seat. In 2020, he introduced a bill that would require special elections held alongside statewide elections to fill vacancies in the Maryland General Assembly.

In 2016, Moon introduced a bill that would prohibit restaurants banning customers from posting negative reviews online.

During the 2018 legislative session, Moon introduced a bill that would prevent the Washington Redskins from receiving subsidies to build a new stadium unless the team changed its name. In 2019, he introduced legislation that would prevent the state from providing subsidies or land to the team for building a new stadium.

In January 2019, Moon was one of nine Maryland lawmakers to add their names to a manifesto signed by 326 state legislators to reaffirm their commitment to protecting abortion rights. In May 2022, following the leak of a draft majority opinion for the U.S. Supreme Court case Dobbs v. Jackson Women's Health Organization, Moon joined protests at the Supreme Court against the overturning of Roe v. Wade.

During the 2019 legislative session, Moon introduced a bill with state delegate Kathy Szeliga that would require legislative sessions to be livestreamed. The bill was withdrawn after House Speaker Michael E. Busch and Senate President Thomas V. Miller Jr. said they would begin livestreaming sessions in 2020. On January 30, 2020, the Maryland General Assembly livestreamed its first legislative session on YouTube.

During the 2022 legislative session, after the Harford County Sheriff charged four men with sodomy in 2021, Moon introduced bills to repeal sodomy as a criminal offense. The bill was reintroduced in 2023, during which it passed and became law without Governor Moore's signature.

=== Transportation ===
In 2008, Moon served as a director for the Purple Line Now! organization, which supports the construction of the Purple Line. In September 2013, he spoke in support of a county proposal to build a 160-mile bus rapid transit system in Montgomery County.

== Personal life ==
Moon is married to his wife, Melinda Coolidge.

In October 2019, Moon had his car, a 2009 Nissan Versa, stolen from his driveway in Takoma Park. The car was found by police and returned to Moon in November.

== Electoral history ==
Maryland House of Delegates District 20 Democratic primary election, 2014
Party	Candidate	Votes	%
Democratic	Sheila E. Hixson (incumbent)	9,135	24.5
Democratic	David Moon	6,959	18.7
Democratic	William C. Smith Jr.	6,006	16.1
Democratic	Will Jawando	5,620	15.1
Democratic	Darian Unger	4,296	11.5
Democratic	Jonathan Shurberg	2,997	8.0
Democratic	Justin W. Chappell	1,076	2.9
Democratic	D'Juan Hopewell	778	2.1
Democratic	George Zokle	397	1.1

Maryland House of Delegates District 20 election, 2014
Party	Candidate	Votes	%
Democratic	Sheila E. Hixson (incumbent)	23,519	31.6
Democratic	William C. Smith Jr.	21,989	29.6
Democratic	David Moon	21,646	29.1
Green	Daniel S. Robinson	6,801	9.1
Write-in		407	0.5

Maryland House of Delegates District 20 election, 2018
Party	Candidate	Votes	%
Democratic	David Moon (incumbent)	38,892	35.0
Democratic	Jheanelle Wilkins (incumbent)	36,750	33.1
Democratic	Lorig Charkoudian	34,749	31.3
Write-in		718	0.6

Male Delegates to the Democratic National Convention election, District 8, 2020
Party	Candidate	Votes	%
Democratic	Alan S. Bowser (Biden)	86,067	17.2
Democratic	Milton L. Jones (Biden)	82,737	16.6
Democratic	William Reid (Biden)	80,607	16.1
Democratic	Marc J. Zwillinger (Biden)	80,554	16.1
Democratic	Jordy R. Diaz (Sanders)	16,976	3.4
Democratic	Danny I. Moreno (Sanders)	15,378	3.1
Democratic	Liam F. Berry-Drobnich (Sanders)	15,003	3.0
Democratic	Evan Glass (Warren)	13,242	2.6
Democratic	Bob Muehlenkamp (Sanders)	12,947	2.6
Democratic	David Moon (Warren)	10,162	2.0
Democratic	Juan Carlos Iturregui (Warren)	8,111	1.6
Democratic	Tom Hucker (Uncommitted)	6,920	1.4
Democratic	Benjamin Howard Cole Beaury (Warren)	6,706	1.3
Democratic	Scott Evan Goldberg (Warren)	5,845	1.2
Democratic	Ashwani Jain (Buttigieg)	4,689	0.9
Democratic	Camden Raynor (Warren)	4,471	0.9
Democratic	Cameron Walkup (Warren)	4,290	0.9
Democratic	Joseph McCarthy (Buttigieg)	4,024	0.8
Democratic	Ari Michael Feuer (Klobuchar)	3,859	0.8
Democratic	Samuel J. Lieberman (Klobuchar)	3,623	0.7
Democratic	Henry K. Ho (Yang)	3,476	0.7
Democratic	Benjamin Matthew Wolff (Buttigieg)	3,258	0.7
Democratic	Thomas Mulczynski (Buttigieg)	3,106	0.6
Democratic	Ronald E. Cohen (Yang)	2,699	0.5
Democratic	Joseph David Maka (Yang)	2,324	0.5
Democratic	Ken Kerr (Uncommitted)	2,203	0.4
Democratic	Jeffrey Zane Slavin (Bloomberg)	2,110	0.4
Democratic	Matthew Murguia (Uncommitted)	2,044	0.4
Democratic	Frederick A. Olowin (Yang)	1,899	0.4
Democratic	Kade Friedlander (Bloomberg)	1,721	0.3
Democratic	Richard L. McCarthy (Uncommitted)	1,678	0.3
Democratic	Edward Kimmel (Uncommitted)	1,419	0.3
Democratic	Andrew Vermilye (Bloomberg)	1,106	0.2
Democratic	Joseph P. Esposito (Bennet)	1,040	0.2
Democratic	Richard H. Goodwin Jr. (Gabbard)	992	0.2
Democratic	Martin Russell (Gabbard)	909	0.2
Democratic	John Maslin (Gabbard)	875	0.2
Democratic	Peter MacGahan (Gabbard)	849	0.2

Maryland House of Delegates District 20 election, 2022
Party	Candidate	Votes	%
Democratic	David Moon (incumbent)	31,489	33.8
Democratic	Jheanelle Wilkins (incumbent)	30,862	33.1
Democratic	Lorig Charkoudian	30,130	32.3
Write-in		735	0.8

Maryland House of Delegates
Preceded by Marc Korman	Majority Leader of the Maryland House of Delegates; 2023–present	Incumbent
