= Heather Mizeur =

American politician

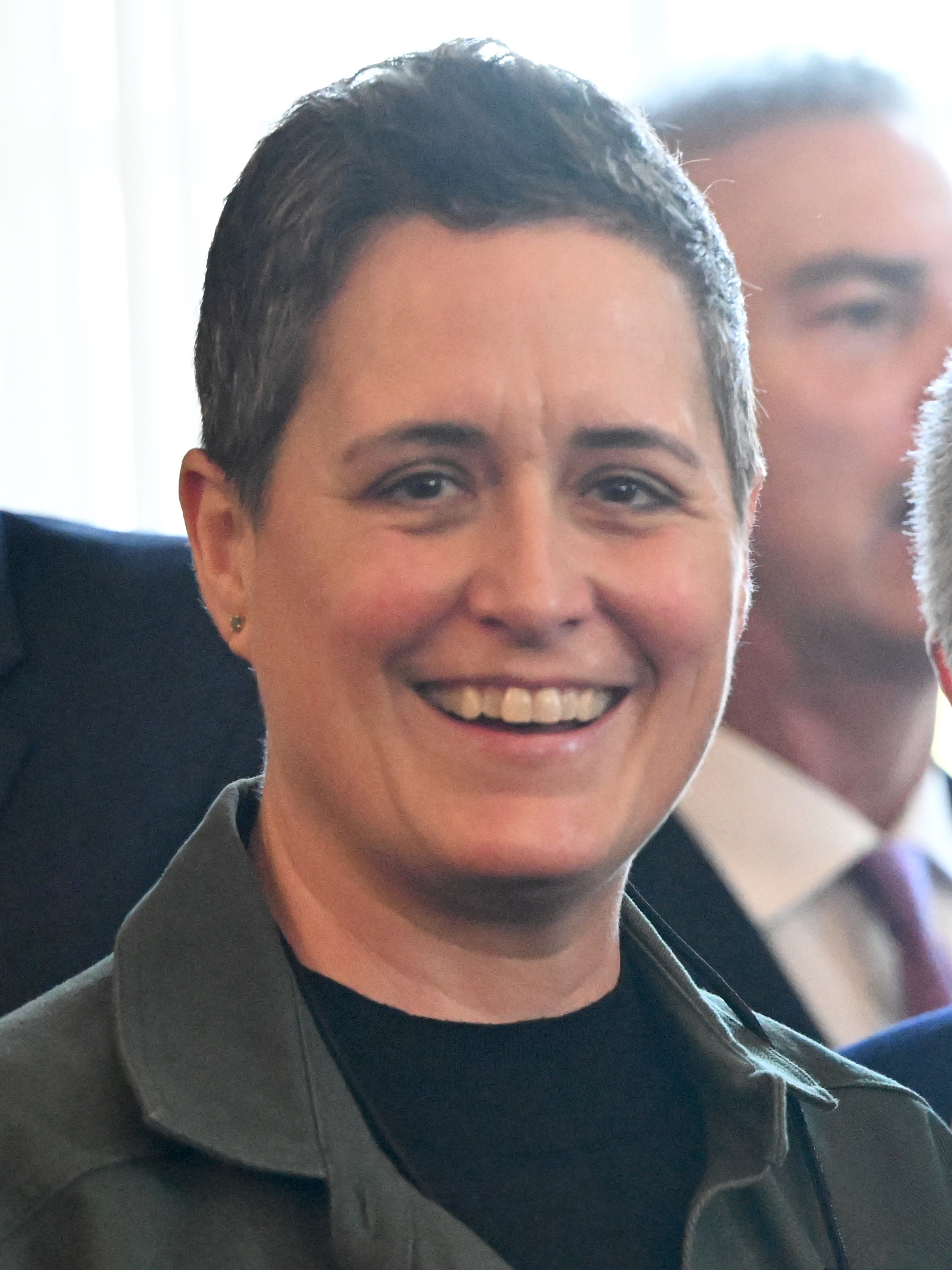
- Mizeur in 2026

Member of the Maryland House of Delegates from the 20th district
- In office January 10, 2007 – January 14, 2015 Serving with Sheila E. Hixson and Tom Hucker
- Preceded by: Peter Franchot
- Succeeded by: David Moon

Personal details
- Born: December 6, 1972 (age 53) Blue Mound, Illinois, U.S.
- Party: Democratic
- Spouse: Deborah Mizeur
- Education: University of Illinois at Urbana–Champaign (no degree)
- Heather Mizeur's voice Heather Mizeur on her political career and 2022 congressional campaign Recorded June 26, 2022

Heather R. Mizeur (/mɪˈzɪər/ mih-ZEER; born December 6, 1972) is an American politician who served as a member of the Maryland House of Delegates from January 10, 2007 to January 14, 2015, representing the 20th district in Montgomery County, Maryland. She was a candidate for governor of Maryland in the 2014 election but lost the Democratic primary to Lieutenant Governor Anthony Brown. In 2022, she unsuccessfully ran for the United States House of Representatives in Maryland's 1st congressional district, challenging incumbent U.S. Representative Andy Harris. She lost the general election to Harris by 11 points.

== Early life and career ==
Mizeur was born on December 6, 1972, in Blue Mound, Illinois. Her father, Dale Mizeur, was a welder at the Caterpillar, Inc. factory and a member of the United Auto Workers. She attended Blue Mound High School, where she graduated as valedictorian of her graduating class. Mizeur attended the University of Illinois Urbana-Champaign as a Truman scholar from 1991 to 1994, but dropped out after receiving a full-time job offer in the office of U.S. Representative Marjorie Margolies-Mezvinsky, who she had interned for during her junior year.

Mizeur first got involved with politics when she was 15 years old, volunteering for the campaign of Illinois State Senator Penny Severns. By age 23, she served as the legislative director for U.S. Representative Joseph P. Kennedy II. In 1998, Mizeur briefly left Capitol Hill to work for the National Association of Community Health Centers before returning to work for U.S. Senator John Kerry in 2003, later working on his presidential campaign team and writing his health care platform.

In November 2003, Mizeur was elected to the Takoma Park City Council, succeeding outgoing councilwoman Carol Stewart. Around this time, she also became a lobbyist specializing in health care policy. In 2005, after state delegate Peter Franchot announced that he would run in the 2006 Maryland Comptroller election, Mizeur entered the race to succeed him. She won the Democratic primary, placing first with 21.9 percent of the vote, and later won the general election with 30.8 percent of the vote.

== Maryland House of Delegates ==
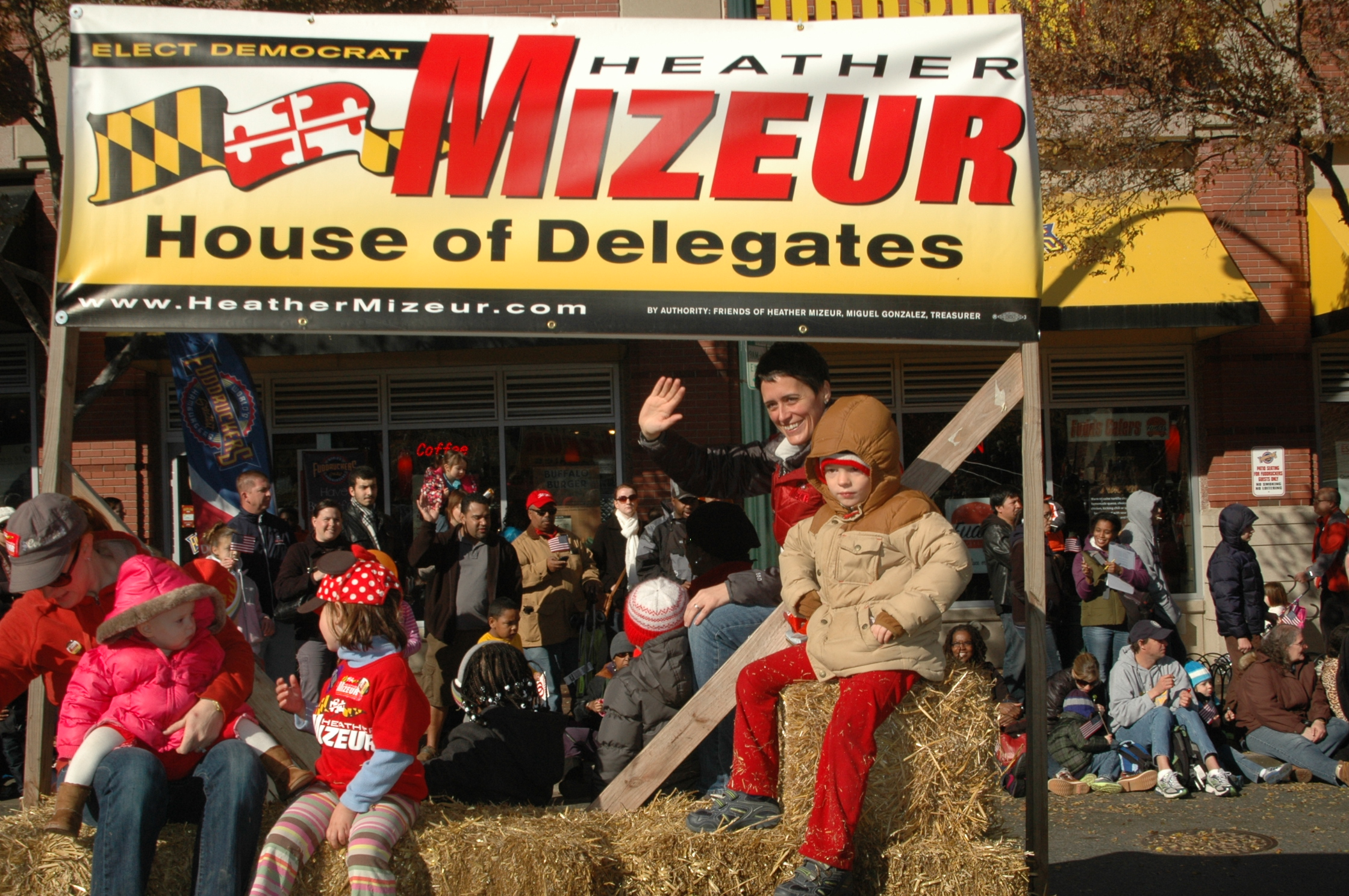
Mizeur campaigning in 2012

Mizeur was sworn into the Maryland House of Delegates on January 10, 2007, and was re-elected for a second term in 2010. She was the first openly gay member of the Maryland General Assembly to have a spouse. Mizeur was a member of the Health and Government Operations Committee from 2007 to 2009, afterwards serving on the Appropriations Committee until 2015, including as the vice chair of its education and economic development subcommittee. She was also a member of the Montgomery County Delegation and the Women Legislators of Maryland.

== 2014 Maryland gubernatorial campaign ==
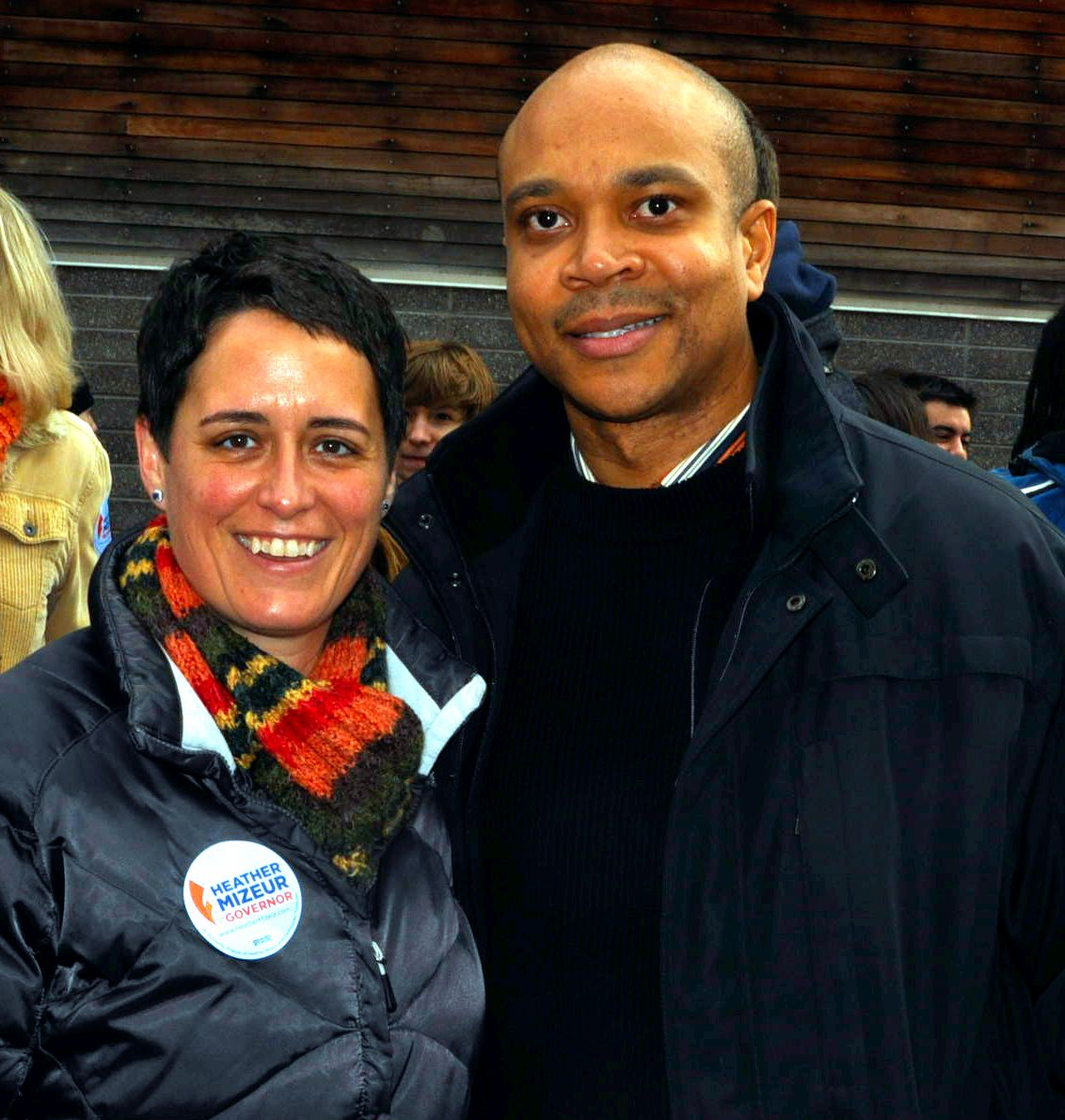
Mizeur and Coates campaigning in November 2013.

In November 2012, Mizeur told The Washington Blade that she was "taking a very serious look" at running for governor in 2014. She began fundraising for a potential bid in January 2013, before launching her campaign on July 16, 2013. Her running mate was Reverend Delman Coates, a Prince George's County pastor who backed the state's 2012 same-sex marriage referendum. If elected, she would have become Maryland's first female governor and the first openly gay person elected governor of any U.S. state.

Mizeur participated in the state's public financing system, making her the first gubernatorial candidate to limit their campaign spending since Republican Ellen Sauerbrey in 1994.

During the primary, Mizeur received endorsements from former U.S. Representative Wayne Gilchrest, EMILY's List, the National Organization for the Reform of Marijuana Laws, Sierra Club, and Democracy for America. She also refused to criticize any of the other candidates in the primary, instead pointing out the differences in their political positions.

Mizeur was defeated by Lieutenant Governor Anthony Brown in the Democratic primary election on June 25, 2014, placing third with 21.7 percent of the vote. In her concession statement, she said that she needed some time to rest and "collect my thoughts, my energy, and my strategic sense of where we take this next". Mizeur later endorsed Brown in an op-ed to The Baltimore Sun in October 2014, in which she asked her supporters not to vote for her as a write-in candidate in the general election.

== Post-legislative career ==
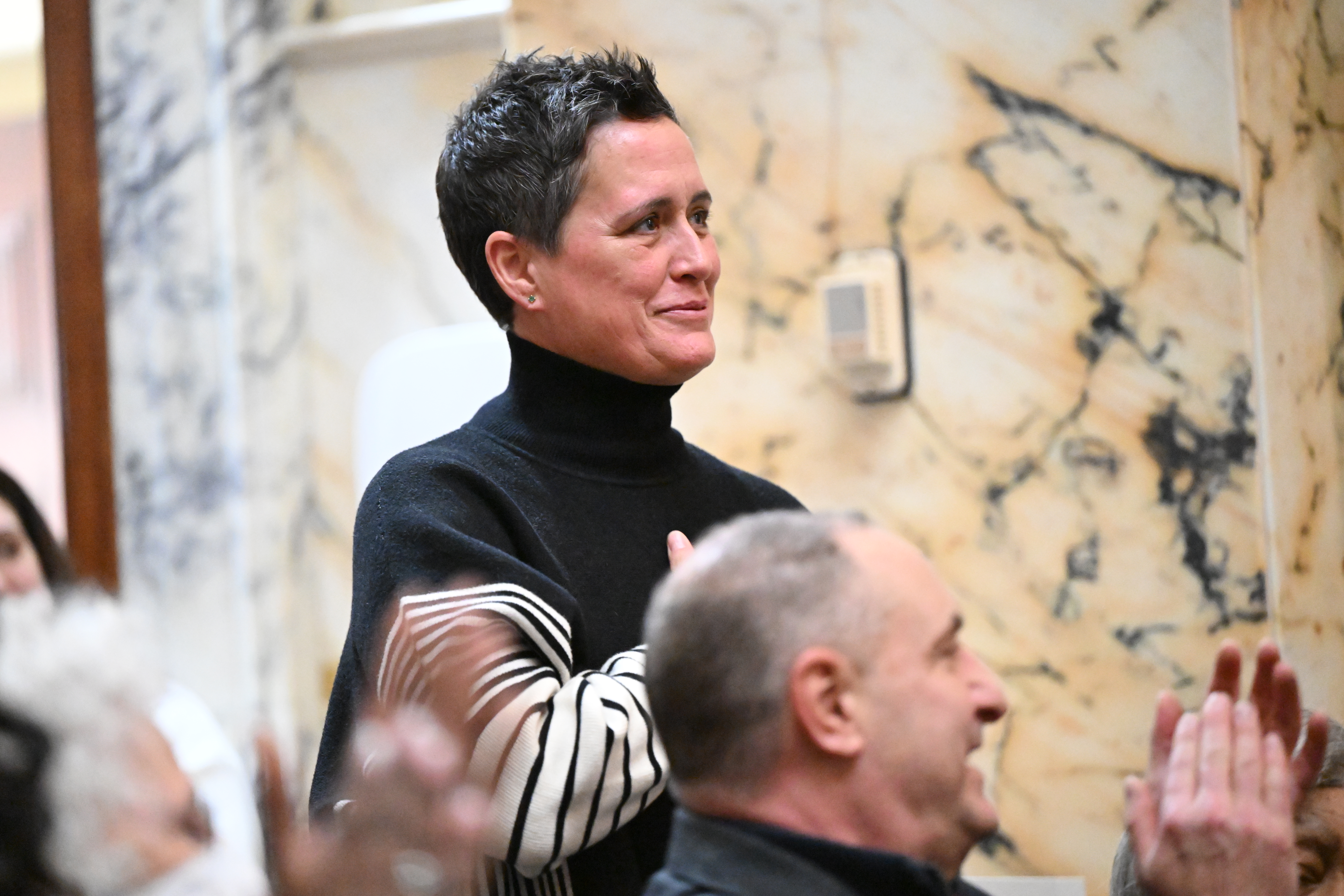
Mizeur on the floor of the Maryland House of Delegates, 2025

Following her gubernatorial campaign, Mizeur did not run for re-election as a member of the Democratic National Committee. She also sold her home in Takoma Park to move to her farm in Chestertown, Maryland, where she and her wife grow organic herbs.

Mizeur was seen as a potential candidate in the 2016 United States Senate election in Maryland, in which incumbent U.S. Senator Barbara Mikulski said she would not run for re-election. She later said on April 8, 2015, that she would not run for Senate in 2016, and later endorsed U.S. Representative Chris Van Hollen for the seat.

In October 2017, Mizeur launched a nonprofit organization named Soul Force Politics, which sought to increase involvement with politics and social justice in Maryland. A podcast by the same name was also launched alongside the nonprofit, which included episodes featuring Melissa Etheridge, former U.S. Senator Barbara Mikulski, Sonja Sohn, Washington Post reporter Jenna Johnson, and Governor Larry Hogan. Mizeur temporarily paused her nonprofit work during her 2022 congressional campaign, after which she rebranded the nonprofit organization to the We Are One Alliance.

In January 2026, House Speaker Joseline Peña-Melnyk announced that Mizeur would serve as her communications director.

== 2022 U.S. House of Representatives campaign ==
In January 2021, Mizeur announced that she would run for the United States House of Representatives in Maryland's 1st congressional district, challenging incumbent U.S. Representative Andy Harris, citing the January 6 United States Capitol attack and Harris' involvement in refusing to certify the results of the 2020 United States presidential election.

During the primary, Mizeur received endorsements from the entire Maryland House delegation (excluding Harris), most Democratic candidates for governor, U.S. Senator Chris Van Hollen, and Salisbury mayor Jacob R. Day. She also received backing from the Congressional LGBTQ+ Equality Caucus, LGBTQ Victory Fund, LPAC, Sierra Club, and EMILY's List.

In December 2021, the Maryland General Assembly redrew Maryland's congressional districts to make Maryland's 1st congressional district more competitive for Democrats, an effort that Mizeur cheered on and invited supporters to testify in support of. Mizeur's opponents accused her of seeking to influence the redistricting process and opposed the newly drawn maps.

Mizeur won the Democratic primary on July 19, 2022, defeating Democratic challenger R. David Harden with 68.8 percent of the vote. In the general election, Mizeur criticized Harris of refusing to debate her, noting that he had turned down multiple debate opportunities. Harris and Mizeur agreed to a televised debate moderated by Cecil TV, a community broadcasting outlet in Cecil County, and to attend a forum hosted by the Kent County chapter of the League of Women Voters. The debate was held on October 27.

Mizeur was defeated by Harris in the general election, in which she received 43.1 percent of the vote to Harris' 54.4 percent. She conceded the election to Harris on the night of the election.

== Personal life ==
Mizeur is openly lesbian, having come out to her parents during her sophomore year of college. She married her wife Deborah in 2005, at a time when same-sex marriages were not recognized by the state of Maryland. The couple made their vows official in California after it briefly made same-sex marriage legal in 2008. The couple lived in Takoma Park while Mizeur served in the Maryland House of Delegates, but later moved to Chestertown, where she owns a 34-acre herb farm, named "The Apotheosis of Washington" after the famous fresco that adorns the dome of the United States Capitol. Mizeur is Catholic.

== Political positions ==
During her 2014 gubernatorial run, Mizeur was regarded as a progressive, as well as the most liberal candidate in the Democratic primary.

=== Education ===
In October 2013, Mizeur unveiled a plan to expand access to pre-kindergarten education by providing full-day pre-K programs to 4-year-olds and half-day programs to 3-year-olds in lower-income families. If enacted, the plan would have cost nearly $280 million annually.

In October 2017, Mizeur said she supported a plan to provide free community college tuition to Maryland students.

=== Energy ===
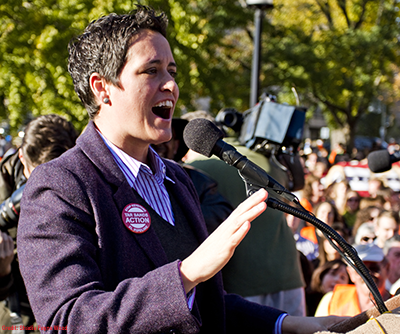
Delegate Mizeur speaking at the "Surround the White House" Rally in 2011.

During the 2011 legislative session, Mizeur introduced a bill that would temporarily ban fracking in Maryland until the Maryland Department of the Environment completed a study to determine whether the practice endangers drinking water and public health. The bill was reintroduced in 2013 and 2014.

In June 2011, Governor Martin O'Malley appointed Mizeur to a commission to investigate whether fracking endangered drinking water and public health. During the 2012 legislative session, she introduced a bill that would require natural gas companies to pay $15 per leased acre to fund the state's fracking study. In November 2014, after the study concluded and Governor O'Malley allowed energy companies to begin drilling in the state, Mizeur cautioned governor-elect Larry Hogan against acting in a rash manner when mapping out his administration's fracking proposals.

In September 2011, Mizeur introduced a Democratic National Committee resolution that called on President Obama to kill the Keystone Pipeline. In November, Mizeur attended and spoke at the "Surround the White House" rally to protest the construction of the pipeline.

In February 2012, Mizeur said she supported imposing a severance tax on natural gas of at least 10 percent, and was "open-minded" about a rate as high as 15 percent. She also said that the state should not allow drilling without first passing a "competitive" severance tax to ensure the state is able to oversee the industry.

In May 2014, Mizeur unveiled a plan to increase government oversight on utility companies by expanding the Maryland Public Service Commission membership, reforming the franchising process, and requiring power companies to renegotiate their licenses every 10 to 15 years.

In November 2022, Mizeur said she supported building wind farms off the coast of Maryland, saying that she refused to believe it was an "either-or choice" in supporting wind energy or supporting commercial fishermen.

=== Immigration ===
In November 2022, Mizeur said she supported providing immigrants with H-2B visas to support Maryland's commercial fishing and aquaculture industry.

=== Marijuana ===
During her gubernatorial campaign, Mizeur said she supported legalizing and taxing the sale of recreational marijuana in Maryland, and said she would use the revenue generated from its sale to fund expanded pre-kindergarten education. In April 2014, Mizeur voted for a bill to decriminalize the possession of small amounts of marijuana, instead making it a civil offense.

=== Minimum wage ===
In November 2013, Mizeur said she would support raising the state's minimum wage to $16.70 by 2022. At the time, the state's minimum wage was $7.25 an hour. In May 2014, she introduced the Paycheck Fairness Act, a proposed bill that would require employers to justify differences in pay between men and women for similar jobs and treat gender discrimination the same way under the law as racial discrimination. She also proposed a paid family leave program that would pay workers two-thirds their salary and up to $1,000 a week for up to six weeks.

In March 2014, Mizeur voted to increase the state's minimum wage from $7.25 an hour to $10.10 an hour by 2017.

=== National politics ===
In 2005, Mizeur ran for one of Maryland's four seats on the Democratic National Committee. She later served as a superdelegate at the 2008 Democratic National Convention, initially staying neutral before eventually pledging her vote to U.S. Senator Barack Obama.

In April 2016, Mizeur endorsed U.S. Senator Bernie Sanders in the 2016 Democratic Party presidential primaries, and supported Hillary Clinton after she was nominated as candidate by the Democratic Party.

=== Social issues ===
In July 2004, Mizeur introduced a resolution to the Takoma Park City Council supporting a lawsuit filed by nine gay couples against the state for the right to wed. The measure passed the city council unanimously, making Takoma Park the first jurisdiction in the state to formally support same-sex marriage.

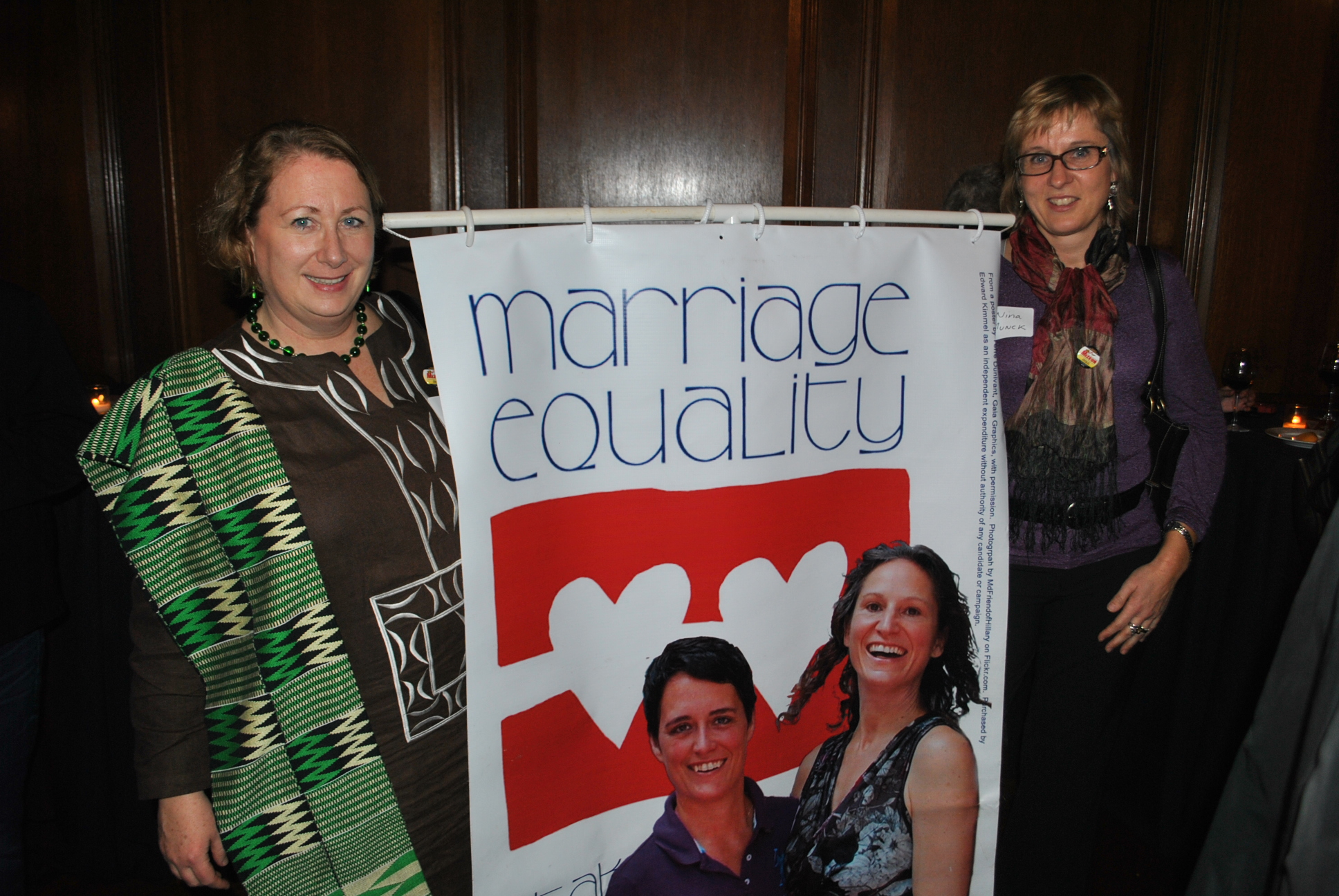
Question 6 supporters hold up a sign depicting Mizeur and her wife, 2012

In 2011, Mizeur supported and spoke in support of the Civil Marriage Protection Act, a bill that would have legalized same-sex marriage in Maryland. After the bill was reintroduced and signed into law in 2012, Mizeur and her wife traveled across the state to fight opponents of Question 6, a ballot referendum seeking to overturn the Civil Marriage Protection Act.

Also in 2011, Mizeur supported and spoke in support of a bill that would provide transgender individuals with protections against gender identity discrimination. She again supported the bill when it was reintroduced in 2014.

In April 2014, Mizeur said she supported legalizing physician-assisted suicide for terminally ill patients.

=== Taxes ===
In November 2013, Mizeur unveiled a tax plan that included tax hikes for the state's wealthy, cuts of up to $150 a year to the state's income tax, and property tax breaks for small businesses. She also said she supported creating a Cabinet-level position for advocating for regulatory reforms on the behalf of the business community.

In May 2022, Mizeur said she supported closing tax loopholes for large corporations and restoring tax rates for individuals making more than $400,000 a year to the rates they were paying to their pre-Tax Cuts and Jobs Act of 2017 levels. She also said she supported providing tax credits to renters to preserve affordable housing.

== Electoral history ==
Takoma Park City Council Ward 2 election, 2003
| Candidate | Votes | % |
|---|---|---|
| Heather R. Mizeur | 393 | 75.2 |
| Juan L. Torres | 128 | 24.5 |
| Write-in | 2 | 0.4 |

Maryland House of Delegates District 20 Democratic primary election, 2006
| Party | Candidate | Votes | % |
|---|---|---|---|
| Democratic | Heather R. Mizeur | 8,176 | 21.9 |
| Democratic | Sheila E. Hixson (incumbent) | 7,379 | 19.7 |
| Democratic | Tom Hucker | 7,331 | 19.6 |
| Democratic | Aaron Klein | 6,388 | 17.1 |
| Democratic | Lucinda Lessley | 3,336 | 8.9 |
| Democratic | Diane Nixon | 2,426 | 6.5 |
| Democratic | Gareth E. Murray | 2,353 | 6.3 |

Maryland House of Delegates District 20 election, 2006
| Party | Candidate | Votes | % |
|---|---|---|---|
| Democratic | Sheila E. Hixson (incumbent) | 24,124 | 32.0 |
| Democratic | Heather R. Mizeur | 23,233 | 30.8 |
| Democratic | Tom Hucker | 22,704 | 30.1 |
| Republican | John W. Wrightson | 5,032 | 6.7 |
| Write-in | | 266 | 0.4 |

Maryland House of Delegates District 20 election, 2010
| Party | Candidate | Votes | % |
|---|---|---|---|
| Democratic | Sheila E. Hixson (incumbent) | 23,782 | 34.4 |
| Democratic | Heather R. Mizeur (incumbent) | 22,532 | 32.6 |
| Democratic | Tom Hucker (incumbent) | 22,434 | 32.4 |
| Write-in | | 472 | 0.7 |

Maryland gubernatorial Democratic primary election, 2014
| Party | Candidate | Votes | % |
|---|---|---|---|
| Democratic | Anthony Brown; Kenneth Ulman | 249,398 | 51.4 |
| Democratic | Doug Gansler; Jolene Ivey | 117,383 | 24.2 |
| Democratic | Heather Mizeur; Delman Coates | 104,721 | 21.6 |
| Democratic | Cindy Walsh; Mary Elizabeth Wingate-Pennacchia | 6,863 | 1.4 |
| Democratic | Charles Smith; Clarence Tucker | 3,507 | 0.7 |
| Democratic | Ralph Jaffe; Freda Jaffe | 3,221 | 0.7 |

Maryland's 1st congressional district Democratic primary election, 2022
| Party | Candidate | Votes | % |
|---|---|---|---|
| Democratic | Heather Mizeur | 34,549 | 68.8 |
| Democratic | R. David Harden | 15,683 | 31.2 |

Maryland's 1st congressional district election, 2022
| Party | Candidate | Votes | % |
|---|---|---|---|
| Republican | Andy Harris (incumbent) | 159,673 | 54.4 |
| Democratic | Heather Mizeur | 126,511 | 43.1 |
| Libertarian | Daniel Thibeault | 6,924 | 2.4 |
| Write-in | | 250 | 0.1 |

Maryland House of Delegates
| Preceded by Peter Franchot | Member of the Maryland House of Delegates from the 20th district 2007–2015 | Succeeded by David Moon |
