= Lorig Charkoudian =

American politician (born 1973)

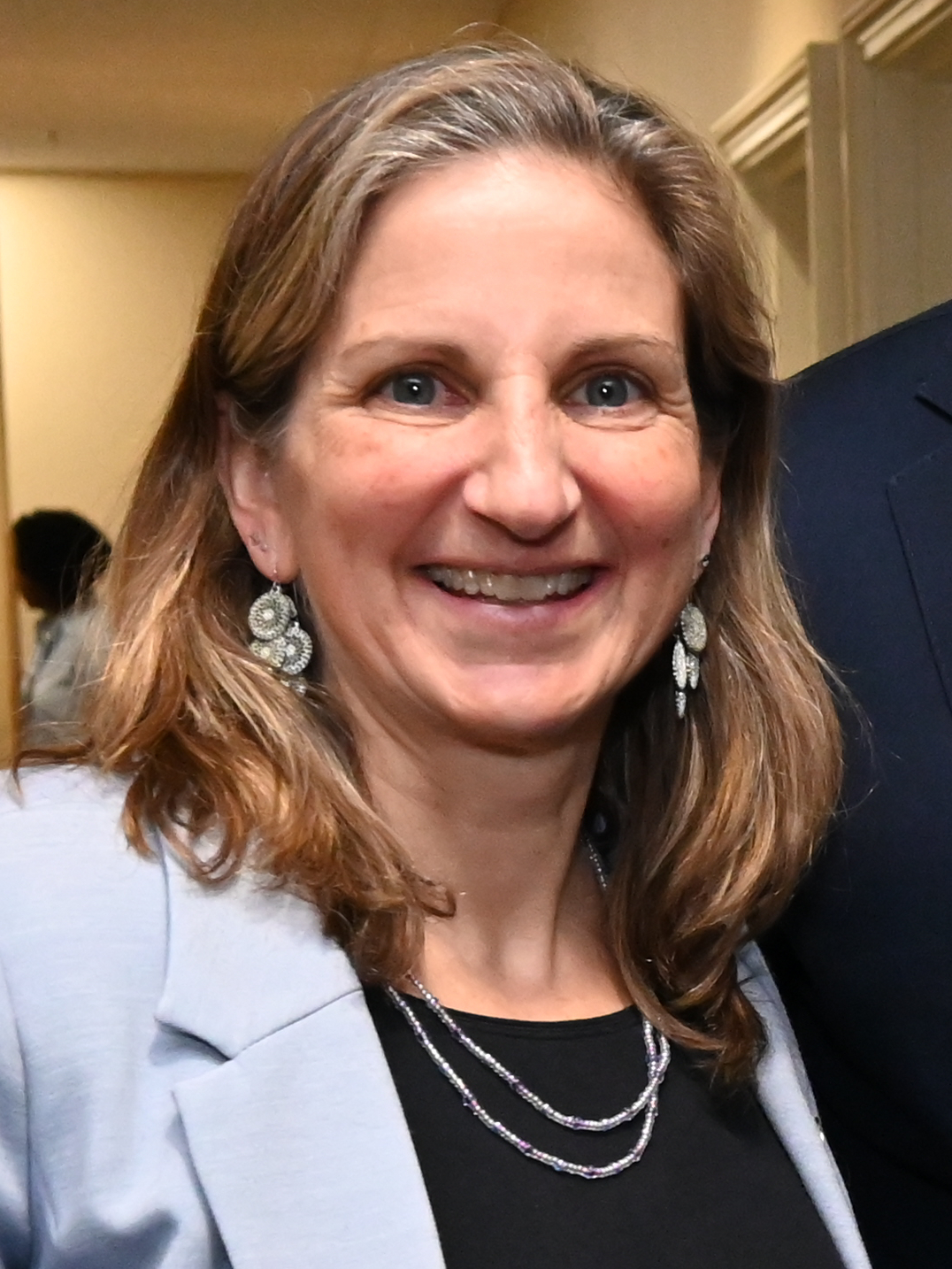
- Charkoudian in 2026

Member of the Maryland House of Delegates from the 20th district
- Incumbent
- Assumed office January 9, 2019 Serving with David Moon, Jheanelle Wilkins
- Preceded by: Sheila E. Hixson

Personal details
- Born: February 14, 1973 (age 53) Boston, Massachusetts, U.S.
- Party: Democratic
- Children: 2
- Education: Pomona College (BA); Johns Hopkins University (PhD)
- Website: Campaign website

Lorig Charkoudian (born February 14, 1973) is an American politician who has served as a member of the Maryland House of Delegates representing District 20 since 2019.

== Early life and education ==
Charkoudian was born in Boston on February 14, 1973, to mother Bethel Charkoudian and father Levon Charkoudian, both Armenian civil rights activists. Two of her grandparents were survivors of the Armenian genocide. She graduated from public schools in Newton, Massachusetts, and attended Pomona College, where she earned a Bachelor of Arts degree in mathematical economics in 1995, afterwards moving to Baltimore to attend Johns Hopkins University, where she earned a Doctor of Philosophy degree in economics in 2002.

== Career ==
=== Early career ===
Charkoudian has served as the executive director of Community Mediation Maryland since 2004. She has also served on the boards of directors of multiple local organizations, including the Takoma Park Silver Spring Food Co-op and the Crossroads Community Food Network.

Charkoudian is a member of the Montgomery County Women's Democratic Club. In August 2004, she became involved in efforts to lobby Starbucks to allow mothers to breastfeed openly. Charkoudian also participated in protests outside of the U.S. Supreme Court against the death penalty, nuclear weapons, and the Iraq War.

In 2011, Charkoudian unsuccessfully ran for the Takoma Park City Council, losing to Tim Male by a margin of 17 votes out of 685 cast.

=== Maryland House of Delegates ===
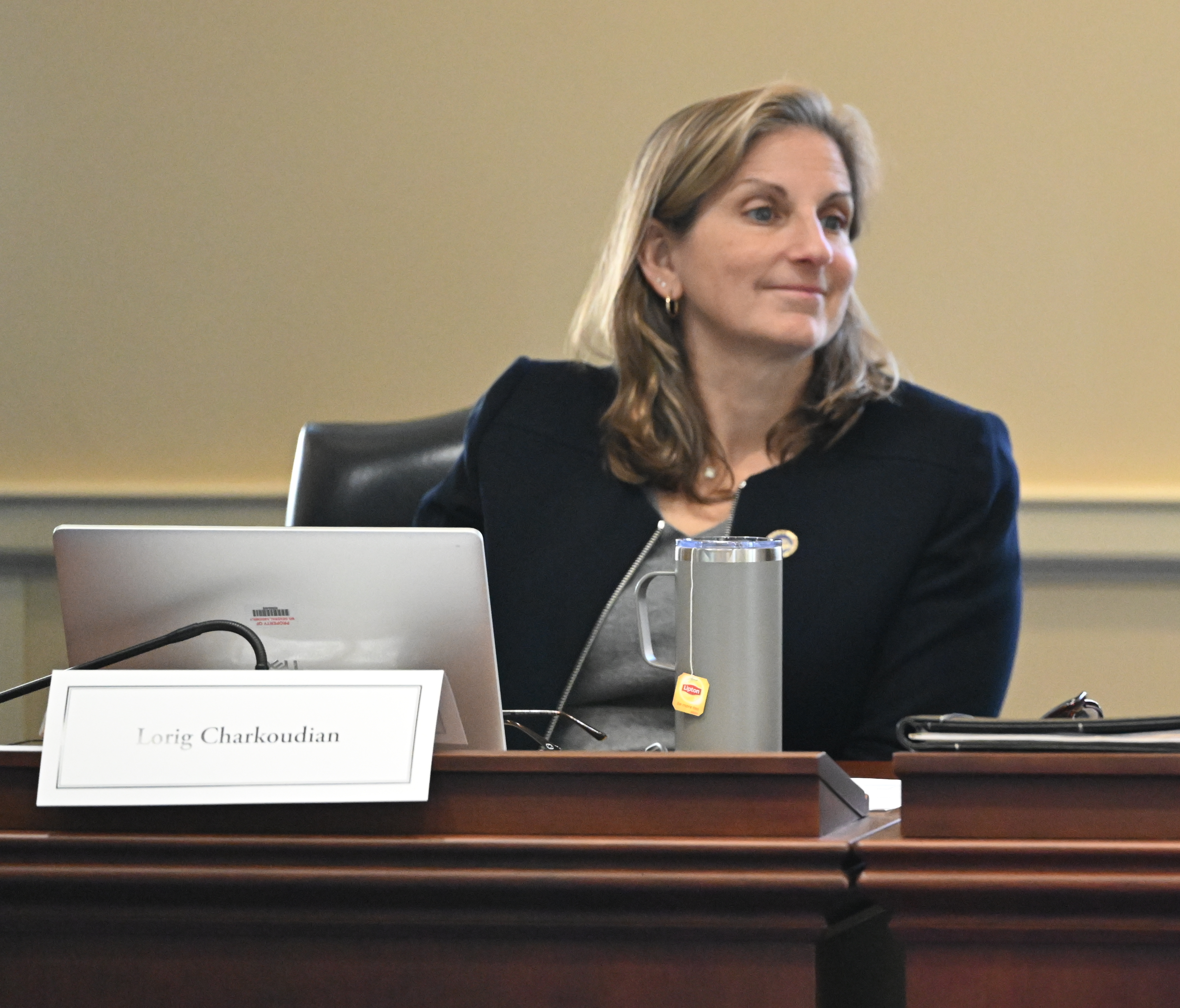
Charkoudian in the House Rules and Executive Nominations Committee, 2026

In December 2016, after state Delegate William C. Smith Jr. was appointed to the Maryland Senate following the election of Jamie Raskin to the U.S. House of Representatives, Charkoudian applied to serve the remainder of Smith's term in the Maryland House of Delegates. The Montgomery County Democratic Central Committee voted 19-9 to nominate committee member Jheanelle Wilkins to the seat in January 2017. Later that year, Charkoudian graduated from a training course hosted by Emerge Maryland, an organization created to prepare potential female Democratic candidates for public office, and filed to run for District 20 in the 2018 Maryland House of Delegates election. She ran on a slate with Smith, Wilkins, and state Delegate David Moon, and placed third in the Democratic primary with 18.7 percent of the vote. Charkoudian ran unopposed in the general election.

Charkoudian was sworn in on January 9, 2019. She is the first Armenian American member of the Maryland House of Delegates. Charkoudian has served as a member of the Economic Matters Committee since 2019, becoming its vice chair in December 2025.

During the 2020 Democratic Party presidential primaries, Charkoudian unsuccessfully ran to serve as a delegate to the Democratic National Convention, pledged to U.S. Senator Elizabeth Warren. In the general election, she canvassed in York, Pennsylvania, for Democratic nominee Joe Biden. She again applied to run as a delegate to the 2024 Democratic National Convention, pledged to Biden, but was denied by the Maryland Democratic Party.

== Political positions ==
=== Environment ===
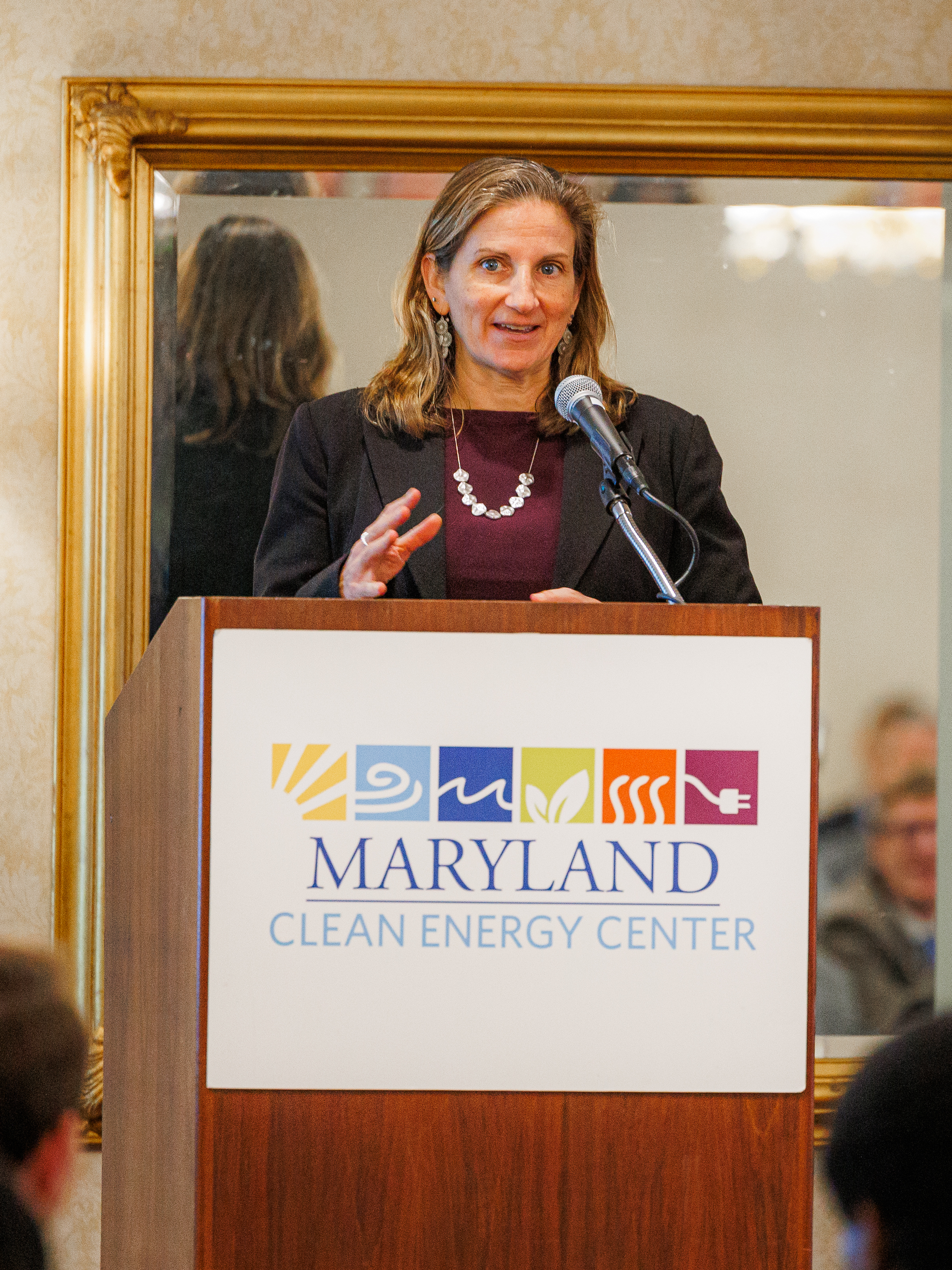
Charkoudian speaks at a Maryland Clean Energy Center reception, 2024

In November 2019, Charkoudian penned a letter to state Treasurer Nancy Kopp, who chairs the state's 529 college savings plan board, urging the board to offer the option to invest in ESG investment funds.

During the 2020 legislative session, Charkoudian supported a bill to impose a carbon tax to fund clean energy and education projects in Maryland, and introduced legislation that would allow counties to negotiate energy purchasing.

During the 2022 legislative session, Charkoudian introduced a bill to expedite the electrification process in rental units, which passed but was vetoed by Governor Larry Hogan. The bill was reintroduced in 2023, during which it passed and was signed into law by Governor Wes Moore.

=== Energy ===
In 2021, Charkoudian introduced a bill that would require the Maryland Public Service Commission to consider the effect of climate change when reviewing applications for new energy facilities. She also introduced bills requiring one percent of the state's energy portfolio to come from geothermal energy produced within the state, and another requiring that food waste be diverted from landfills to organic recycling facilities or be donated to farms to be used as animal feed, both of which passed and became law. Charkoudian also joined the Leaders for Climate Accountability, a national work of public officials who support holding corporate polluters accountable for their contributions to the climate crisis.

Charkoudian supports proposals to build an offshore wind farm off the coast of Ocean City, Maryland. In 2023, she introduced the POWER Act, a bill that would increase the state's wind power generation goal to 8.5 gigawatts and ease the construction of shared transmission infrastructure. The bill passed and was signed into law by Governor Moore.

During the 2026 legislative session, Charkoudian introduced legislation to create a competitive procurement process for utility-scale solar projects in Maryland funded by funds collected for the state's renewable energy portfolio standard. She also introduced a bill to study Maryland leaving the PJM Interconnection and forming a new grid with several other states. In March 2026, Charkoudian criticized a proposal by Governor Wes Moore to drain $725 million from the Strategic Energy Investment Fund, the state's clean energy fund, to close the state's $1.4 billion budget deficit, introducing a bill to funnel utility compliance fees to solar energy instead of putting it into the SEIF.

=== Healthcare ===
During the 2020 legislative session, Charkoudian introduced a bill to restrict hospitals' ability to collect unpaid medical debts. In 2021, she introduced a bill that would require hospitals to demonstrate a "good faith" effort to have patients with unpaid medical debts agree to a payment plan before filing a lawsuit or engaging a debt collector, which passed and became law.

In 2021, Charkoudian introduced legislation to add a checkbox to unemployment insurance applications that would enroll applicants through the Maryland Health Benefit Exchange, which passed and became law. She later supported efforts by U.S. Senator Chris Van Hollen to implement a similar policy nationwide.

=== Housing ===
During the 2023 legislative session and following an apartment fire in Silver Spring, Maryland, that left one dead, Charkoudian introduced a bill to increase regulations on fire safety measures in apartment buildings. The bill died in committee.

=== Immigration ===
During her 2011 Takoma Park City Council campaign, Charkoudian said she supported the city's sanctuary city policy. In April 2025, she attended and spoke at a rally protesting the deportation of Kilmar Abrego Garcia, saying that she felt that his deportation mirrored a "pattern of fascism" and calling on Americans to stand against it. During the 2026 legislative session, Charkoudian introduced the Data Privacy Act, which prohibits businesses from selling personal data of an individual for the purpose of immigration enforcement, and the No Kings Act, which would allow a civil claim against anyone who violated another's constitutional rights under color of law. The No Kings Act was added to House Bill 351, which allows the attorney general of Maryland to use data collected through police surveillance methods to identify and gather evidence against a judicial officer if someone brought a complaint of wrongful conduct, which she supported.

=== Labor ===
During her 2018 House of Delegates campaign, Charkoudian said that she supported raising the state's minimum wage to $15 an hour. During debate on a bill to do so, she unsuccessfully challenged amendments to delay the state's wage increase and to exempt certain workers from a $15 wage.

During the 2021 legislative session, Charkoudian introduced legislation to reduce bureaucratic hurdles to receive unemployment insurance, which passed and became law. In June 2021, she criticized Governor Larry Hogan's decision to end the $300 supplemental weekly unemployment insurance provided by the American Rescue Plan Act of 2021, disagreeing with his notion that it would lead to state job gains.

During debate on a bill to establish a statewide paid family leave program, Charkoudian introduced an amendment to protect an employee's employment while on leave, which was adopted.

In July 2023, Charkoudian worked as a server at the Sala Thai restaurant in Bethesda to advocate for a Montgomery County Council bill to abolish the tipped minimum wage.

=== Social issues ===
During the 2020 legislative session, Charkoudian supported legislation that would research providing reparations to the descendants of enslaved Africans in Maryland.

During the 2022 legislative session, Charkoudian introduced a bill to ban cat declawing. The bill passed and became law.

=== Taxes ===
During the 2019 legislative session, Charkoudian voted for a bill to impose fees on country club properties in Montgomery County.

In March 2020, Charkoudian proposed a six percent tax on "luxury services", such as fur cleaning and boat repair, to fund the Blueprint for Maryland's Future education reforms.

=== Transportation ===
Charkoudian supports the Purple Line, but opposes the Maryland Department of Transportation's decision to use a public-private partnership to build the transit line, saying that it led to an "absolute disaster" of decisions. During the 2022 legislative session, she supported efforts to provide financial support to businesses impacted by Purple Line construction.

In November 2019, Charkoudian criticized Governor Larry Hogan's proposal to add express toll lanes to Interstate 270, saying that it would worsen existing equity issues by allowing wealthier drivers to pass lower-income motorists.

During the 2021 legislative session, Charkoudian introduced legislation to establish an "urban tree program" to plant trees in communities where transportation projects require deforestation. The bill passed and became law.

== Personal life ==
Charkoudian has two children and lives in Takoma Park, Maryland. She is vegan.

Since 2013, Charkoudian has annually run 72 miles from Hagerstown to Baltimore to fundraise for mediation programs between families and prisoners.

== Electoral history ==
Takoma Park City Council Ward 2 election, 2011
Candidate	Votes	%
Tim Male	351	51.2
Lorig Charkoudian	334	48.8

Maryland House of Delegates District 20 Democratic primary election, 2018
Party	Candidate	Votes	%
Democratic	David Moon (incumbent)	13,974	28.2
Democratic	Jheanelle Wilkins (incumbent)	11,960	24.1
Democratic	Lorig Charkoudian	9,256	18.7
Democratic	Darian Unger	7,126	14.4
Democratic	Fatmata Barrie	4,316	8.7
Democratic	George Zokle	1,751	3.5
Democratic	Malik Lendzondzo	1,196	2.4

Maryland House of Delegates District 20 election, 2018
Party	Candidate	Votes	%
Democratic	David Moon (incumbent)	38,892	35.0
Democratic	Jheanelle Wilkins (incumbent)	36,750	33.1
Democratic	Lorig Charkoudian	34,749	31.3
Write-in		718	0.6

Maryland House of Delegates District 20 election, 2022
Party	Candidate	Votes	%
Democratic	David Moon (incumbent)	31,489	33.8
Democratic	Jheanelle Wilkins (incumbent)	30,862	33.1
Democratic	Lorig Charkoudian	30,130	32.3
Write-in		735	0.8
