= Jheanelle Wilkins =

American politician (born 1988)

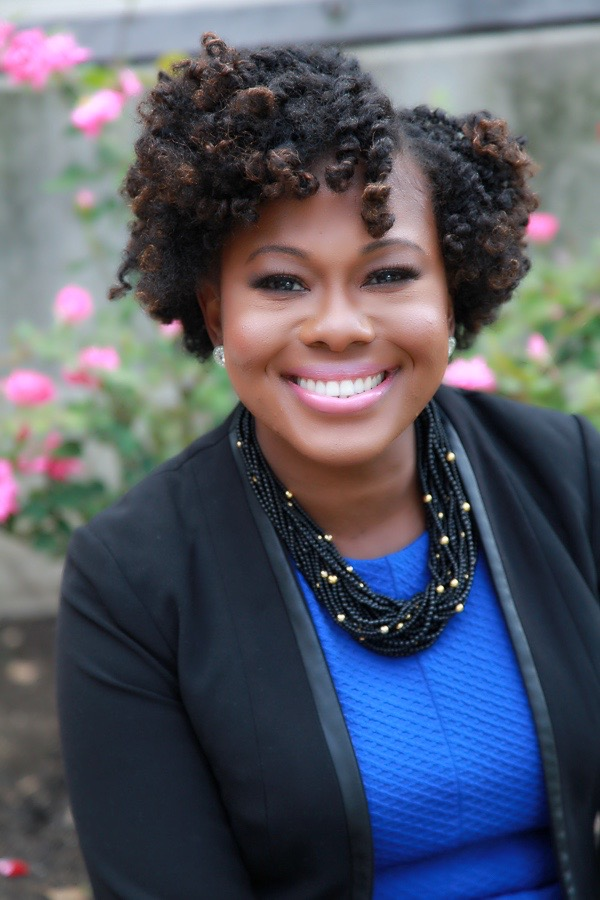

Member of the Maryland House of Delegates from the 20th district
- Incumbent
- Assumed office January 25, 2017
- Appointed by: Larry Hogan
- Preceded by: William C. Smith Jr.

Personal details
- Born: May 29, 1988 (age 38) Kingston, Jamaica
- Party: Democratic
- Education: University of Delaware (BA); American University (MPA)
- Website: Campaign website
- Wilkins's voice Wilkins on the final weeks of the 2026 legislative session. Recorded March 27, 2026

Jheanelle K. Wilkins (born May 29, 1988) is an American politician who has represented District 20 in the Maryland House of Delegates since 2017. A member of the Democratic Party, she served as the chair of the Legislative Black Caucus of Maryland from 2022 to 2026.

== Early life and education ==
Wilkins was born in Kingston, Jamaica, and moved to the United States with her family when she was five. She grew up in New Castle, Delaware, where she graduated from William Penn High School and later attended the University of Delaware, where she earned a Bachelor of Arts degree in sociology in 2009; and American University, where she earned a Master of Public Administration in social policy in 2011.

== Career ==
=== Early career ===
Wilkins started as an intern at the Leadership Conference on Civil and Human Rights in 2008 and has served in various roles, including field assistant, field associate, field manager, and director of state and local government affairs. During her tenure at The Leadership Conference, she has worked to advance immigration reform, education equity, and civil rights legislation, including the Justice Reinvestment Act, which eliminated mandatory minimum sentences for nonviolent offenders in Maryland.

She served on the board of the Montgomery County Association of Black Democrats and was active with the Montgomery County Young Democrats. In 2014, she was elected to the Montgomery County Democratic Central Committee.

=== Maryland House of Delegates ===
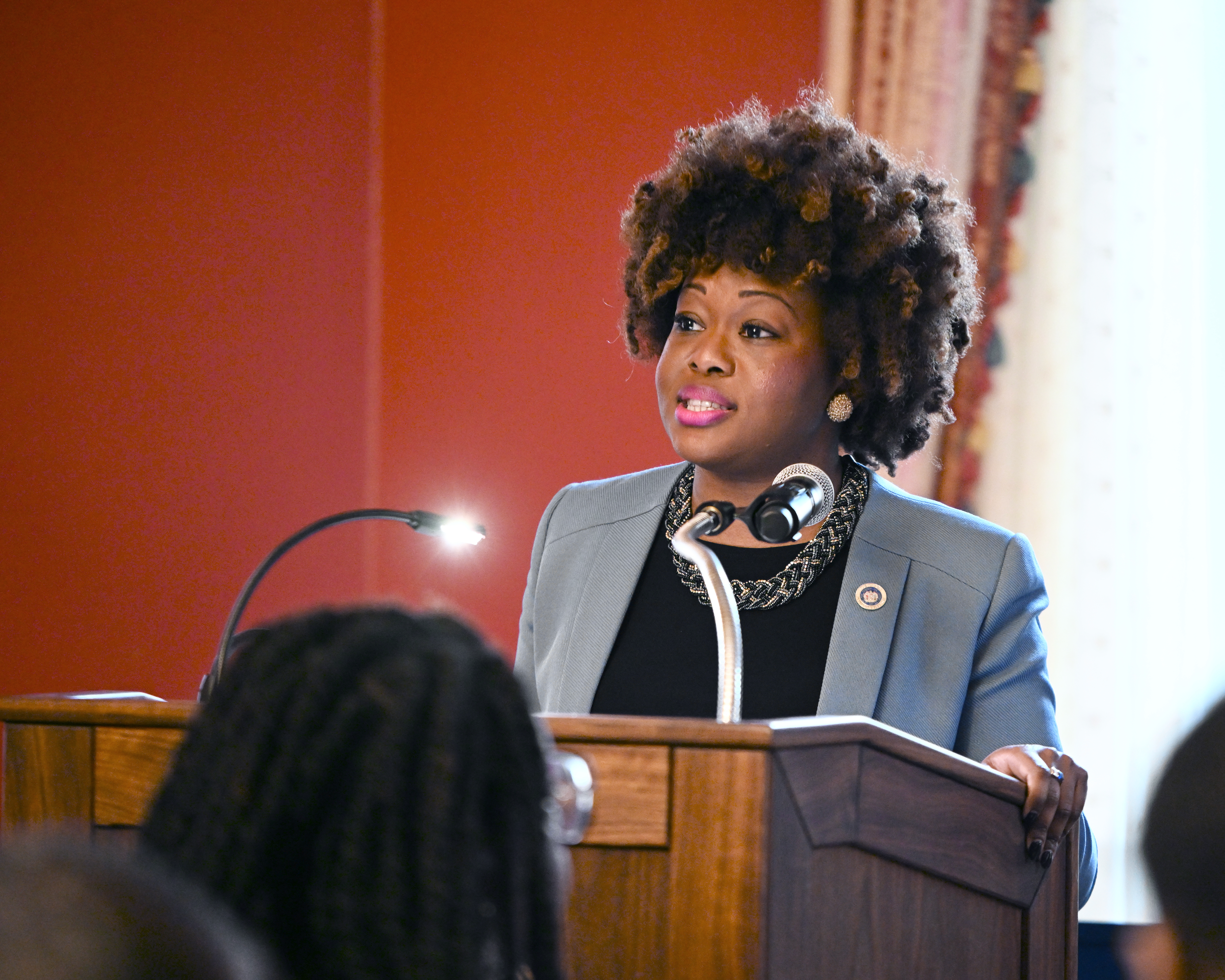
Wilkins speaks during a Legislative Black Caucus of Maryland Legislative Breakfast, 2023.

In December 2016, after state delegate William C. Smith Jr. was appointed to the Maryland Senate following Jamie Raskin's election to the U.S. House of Representatives in Maryland's 8th congressional district, Wilkins applied to fill the vacancy left by Smith in the Maryland House of Delegates. The Montgomery County Democratic Central Committee voted 19–9 to nominate Wilkins to the Maryland House of Delegates on January 10, 2017. She was appointed to the seat by Governor Larry Hogan on January 24, and was sworn in the following day. She is the first African-American woman to represent this district, and became the first Black woman elected to the Maryland House of Delegates from Montgomery County alongside Pamela Queen and Charlotte Crutchfield after winning election to a full term in 2018, during which she ran on a slate with Smith, state delegate David Moon, and Lorig Charkoudian.

Wilkins has been a member of the Ways and Means Committee since 2017, becoming the committee's chair in December 2025. She previously served as the committee's vice chair from 2023 to 2025. Wilkins also served as the House parliamentarian from 2020 to 2023, and is a member of the Montgomery County Delegation, the Legislative Black Caucus of Maryland, the Women Legislators of Maryland Caucus, and the Maryland Legislative Latino Caucus.

In 2020, Wilkins ran for convention delegate to the Democratic National Convention in Maryland's 8th congressional district, pledged to U.S. Senator Elizabeth Warren. She was a delegate to the 2024 Democratic National Convention, pledged to Kamala Harris.

In December 2022, Wilkins was elected as the chair of the Legislative Black Caucus of Maryland, succeeding Darryl Barnes. In December 2025, after Adrienne A. Jones announced she would step down as Speaker of the Maryland House of Delegates, she reportedly began making phone calls to her colleagues expressing interest about a run for speaker. Wilkins dropped out of the race a few days later, endorsing Joseline Peña-Melnyk. In January 2026, Wilkins announced that she would step down as chair of the Legislative Black Caucus of Maryland after being appointed as the chair of the Ways and Means Committee.

== Political positions ==
=== Criminal justice ===
In August 2018, Wilkins participated in a protest in Silver Spring, Maryland following the killing of Robert White, who was shot multiple times during an encounter with the Montgomery County police, where she called for reforms to the criminal justice system. In May 2019, she participated in another demonstration after the Montgomery County Police Department released body camera recordings showing a white officer using the N-word during a loitering investigation.

In August 2020, Wilkins called on Governor Larry Hogan to fire Arthur "Mac" Love IV, the deputy director of the Governor's Office of Community Initiatives, after he posted memes on Facebook showing support for Kyle Rittenhouse, who fatally shot two protesters during the Kenosha unrest. Love was fired on August 29. In April 2021, after Derek Chauvin was sentenced in the murder of George Floyd, Wilkins released a statement calling for an end to police violence. In February 2023, following the killing of Tyre Nichols, she released a statement expressing outrage with Nichols' "heartless" killing.

=== Education ===
In October 2012, Wilkins attended a rally at the U.S. Supreme Court in support of the University of Texas in Fisher v. University of Texas, which held that colleges have some discretion to consider race when making admissions decisions.

During the 2019 legislative session, Wilkins introduced legislation to expand discrimination prohibitions that apply to private schools.

During the 2021 legislative session, Wilkins introduced the "Counselors not Cops Act", which would redirect state funding for school resource officers toward mental health services in schools, and the Police Qualified Immunity and Accountability Act, which would abolish qualified immunity for police officers.

In December 2022, administrators of Maryland's 529 college savings plan discovered a calculation error affecting all 31,000 prepaid accounts, which led to the Maryland Prepaid College Trust suspending interest payments and preventing families from accessing their prepaid plans. During the 2023 legislative session, Wilkins said she would support legislation to increase transparency in the agency.

=== Housing ===
During the 2019 legislative session, Wilkins introduced legislation that would prohibit landlords from evicting tenants without providing a "just cause". The bill was rejected by the House Environment and Transportation Committee, and was reintroduced in 2021 2022, and 2026.

During the COVID-19 pandemic in Maryland, Wilkins led a letter to Governor Larry Hogan calling on him to cancel rent and mortgage payments for residents and businesses affected by the pandemic. During the 2021 legislative session, she introduced legislation to prevent landlords from raising rent or issuing charges during public health crises.

In 2023, Wilkins introduced legislation to allocate $15 million toward rental assistance vouchers.

=== Social issues ===
In January 2016, Wilkins said she would support the legalization of recreational marijuana in Maryland, but said she wanted the state's marijuana industry to reflect the state's diverse population. During the 2023 legislative session, Wilkins said she supported equity provisions in House Bill 556, which established the framework for the state's marijuana industry following the passage of 2022 Maryland Question 4, calling them an "important starting point".

In January 2019, Wilkins was one of nine Maryland lawmakers to add their names to a manifesto signed by 326 state legislators to reaffirm their commitment to protecting abortion rights. In 2022, Wilkins said she opposed the U.S. Supreme Court's ruling in Dobbs v. Jackson Women's Health Organization, which overturned Roe v. Wade, saying that the ruling would disproportionately affect marginalized people.

During the 2019 legislative session, Wilkins introduced legislation that would require the state to disclose how much it pays prisoners who work while serving prison sentences. The legislation passed and became law.

In March 2020, Wilkins said she supported the CROWN Act, which would ban discrimination based on hairstyle in Maryland.

=== Taxes ===
During the 2018 legislative session, Wilkins opposed bills providing tax breaks to corporations and the wealthy, including one that would benefit the Marriott International. She voted for a bill to provide $8.5 billion in incentives to Amazon to build its second headquarters in Maryland, which she initially declined to back until she could see the bill in its final form.

In 2020, Wilkins introduced legislation to provide tax breaks to small businesses affected by the construction of the Purple Line.

During the 2021 legislative session, Wilkins supported legislation to extend the state's earned income tax credit to Individual Taxpayer Identification Number taxpayers.

=== Voting rights ===
During the 2021 legislative session, Wilkins introduced legislation that would allow voters to opt into a permanent vote-by-mail list.

During the 2023 legislative session, Wilkins argued against legislation that would create special elections to fill vacancies in the Maryland General Assembly, saying that she felt that candidates of color would struggle to fundraise in special elections and that the central committee nomination process led to more minority candidates serving in the legislature. In November 2024, she softened her opposition to special elections to fill legislative vacancies, saying that while proposals to allow special elections to fill mid-term vacancies were not perfect, it was time for the legislature to move forward with election reforms. At the same time, she expressed concern with the fundraising abilities of appointed legislators facing a mid-term election, citing the Maryland General Assembly's ban on political fundraising during legislative sessions. Bills to allow special elections to fill legislative vacancies never made it onto the House Ways and Means Committee's agenda during the 2025 legislative session. In February 2026, Wilkins supported a bill that would replace the party central committee appointment process used to fill vacancies in the Maryland General Assembly with special elections held at the same time as regular state primary elections.

In October 2025, Wilkins criticized Senate President Bill Ferguson for ruling out mid-decade redistricting in Maryland in response to Republican efforts to gerrymander congressional maps in various red states, saying that Democrats "have an obligation to make sure district lines truly reflect our communities at a time when voting rights, diversity, and basic freedoms are under assault".

== Electoral history ==
Montgomery County Democratic Central Committee District 20 election, 2014
Party	Candidate	Votes	%
Democratic	Tamika S. Bennett	6,221	40.7
Democratic	Jheanelle Wilkins	4,970	32.5
Democratic	Edward Malcolm Kimmel	4,109	26.9

Maryland House of Delegates District 20 Democratic primary election, 2018
Party	Candidate	Votes	%
Democratic	David Moon (incumbent)	13,974	28.2
Democratic	Jheanelle Wilkins (incumbent)	11,960	24.1
Democratic	Lorig Charkoudian	9,256	18.7
Democratic	Darian Unger	7,126	14.4
Democratic	Fatmata Barrie	4,316	8.7
Democratic	George Zokle	1,751	3.5
Democratic	Malik Lendzondzo	1,196	2.4

Maryland House of Delegates District 20 election, 2018
Party	Candidate	Votes	%
Democratic	David Moon (incumbent)	38,892	35.0
Democratic	Jheanelle Wilkins (incumbent)	36,750	33.1
Democratic	Lorig Charkoudian	34,749	31.3
Write-in		718	0.6

Maryland House of Delegates District 20 election, 2022
Party	Candidate	Votes	%
Democratic	David Moon (incumbent)	31,489	33.8
Democratic	Jheanelle Wilkins (incumbent)	30,862	33.1
Democratic	Lorig Charkoudian	30,130	32.3
Write-in		735	0.8
