= Maryland Legislative District 20 =

American legislative district

Maryland's legislative district 20
- Represents part of Montgomery County
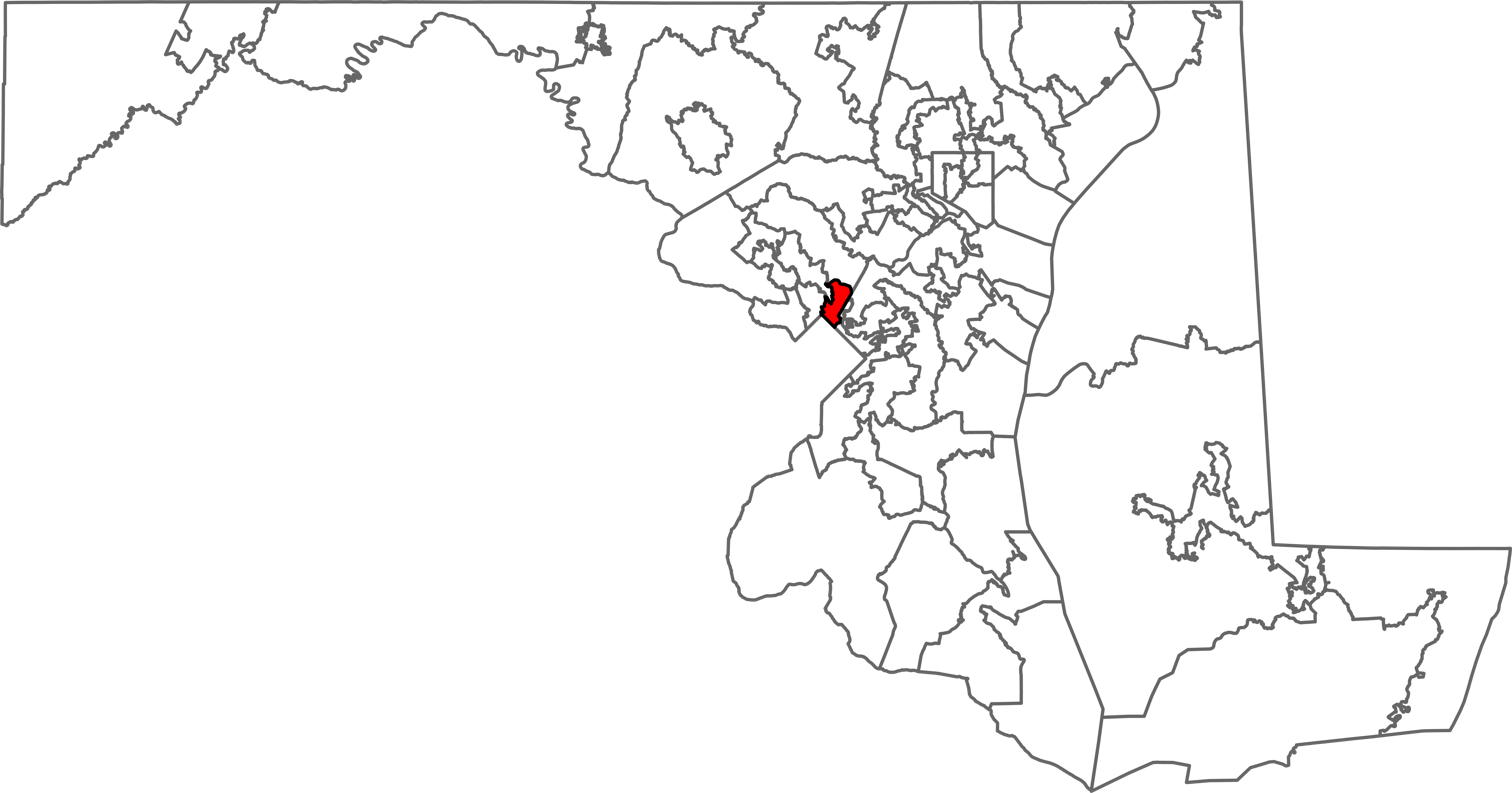
- Senator: William C. Smith Jr. (D)
- Delegate(s): Lorig Charkoudian (D); David Moon (D); Jheanelle K. Wilkins (D)
- Registration: 73.5% Democratic; 7.7% Republican; 17.4% unaffiliated
- Demographics: 33.0% White; 32.9% Black/African American; 1.0% Native American; 7.8% Asian; 0.0% Hawaiian/Pacific Islander; 14.5% Other race; 10.8% Two or more races; 24.3% Hispanic
- Population (2020): 130,131
- Voting-age population: 100,770
- Registered voters: 75,448

Maryland Legislative District 20 is one of 47 districts in the state for the Maryland General Assembly. It covers part of Montgomery County. The district is represented by three delegates in the Maryland House of Delegates.

== Demographic characteristics ==
As of the 2020 United States census, the district had a population of 130,131, of whom 100,770 (77.4%) were of voting age. The racial makeup of the district was 42,998 (33.0%) White, 42,758 (32.9%) African American, 1,302 (1.0%) Native American, 10,114 (7.8%) Asian, 41 (0.0%) Pacific Islander, 18,901 (14.5%) from some other race, and 14,008 (10.8%) from two or more races. Hispanic or Latino of any race were 31,560 (24.3%) of the population.

The district had 75,448 registered voters as of October 17, 2020, of whom 13,164 (17.4%) were registered as unaffiliated, 5,834 (7.7%) were registered as Republicans, 55,431 (73.5%) were registered as Democrats, and 597 (0.8%) were registered to other parties.

== Political representation ==
The district is represented for the 2023–2027 legislative term in the State Senate by William C. Smith Jr. (D) and in the House of Delegates by Lorig Charkoudian (D), David Moon (D) and Jheanelle K. Wilkins (D).

== Election history ==
Years	Senator	Party	Electoral history
January 8, 1975 – January 12, 1983	Victor Crawford	Democratic	Redistricted from District 3-B and re-elected in 1974. Re-elected in 1978. Retired.
January 12, 1983 – January 14, 1987	Stewart W. Bainum Jr.	Democratic	Elected in 1982. Retired to run for Congress.
January 14, 1987 – January 10, 2007	Ida G. Ruben	Democratic	Elected in 1986. Re-elected in 1990. Re-elected in 1994. Re-elected in 1998. Re-elected in 2002. Lost renomination.
January 10, 2007 – November 10, 2016	Jamie Raskin	Democratic	Elected in 2006. Re-elected in 2010. Re-elected in 2014. Resigned to run for Congress.
December 21, 2016 – present	William C. Smith Jr.	Democratic	Appointed to serve the remainder of Raskin's term. Elected in 2018. Re-elected in 2022. Re-elected in 2026.
