= Sheila E. Hixson =

American politician (1933–2022)

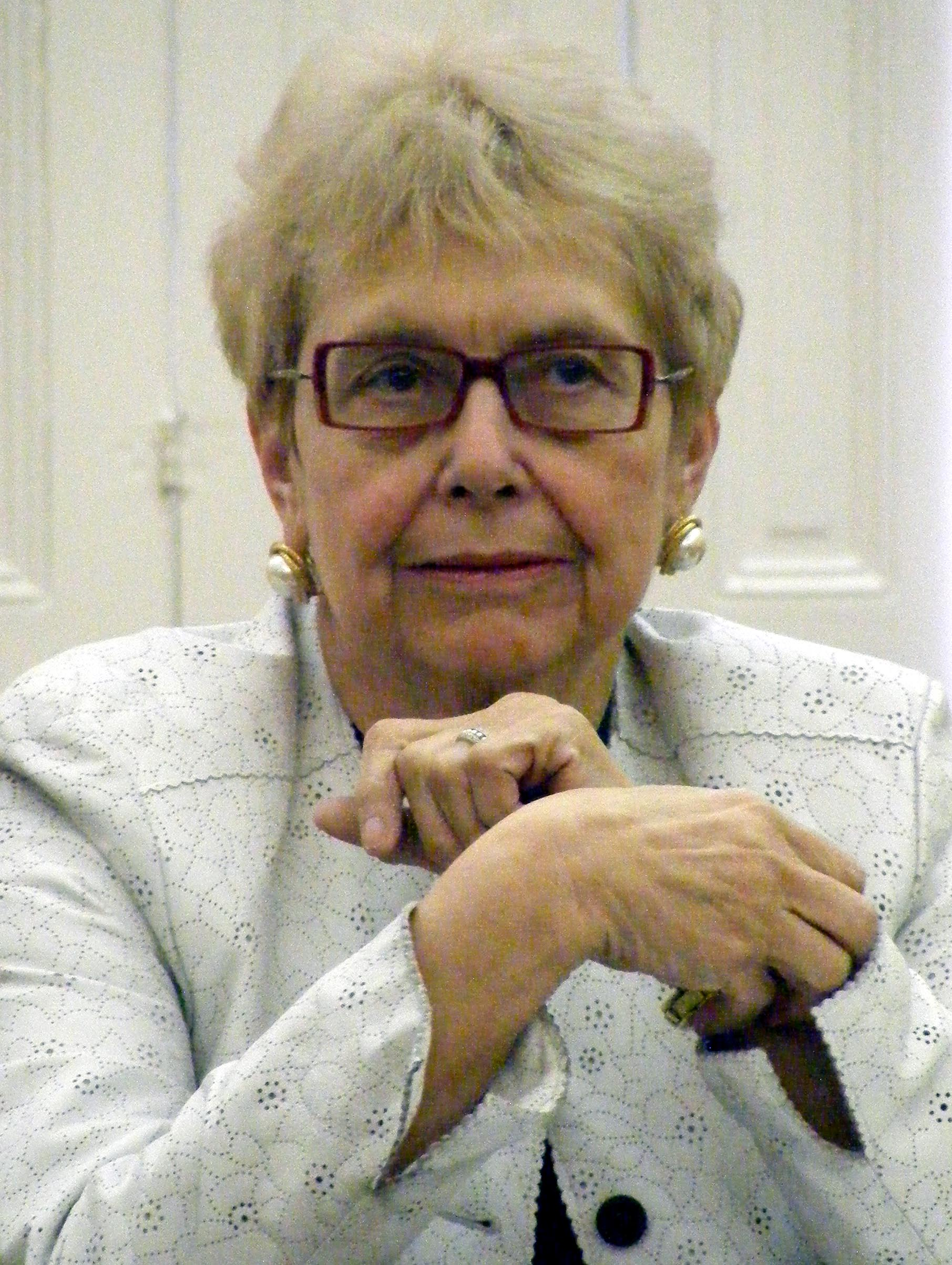

Member of the Maryland House of Delegates from the 20th district
- In office January 14, 1976 – January 9, 2019
- Preceded by: Martin S. Becker
- Succeeded by: Lorig Charkoudian

Personal details
- Born: February 9, 1933 L'Anse, Michigan, U.S.
- Died: November 6, 2022 (aged 89)
- Party: Democratic
- Children: 4
- Profession: Unionist

Sheila Ellis Hixson (February 9, 1933 – November 6, 2022) was an American politician who served as a Democrat in the Maryland House of Delegates from 1976 to 2018. She represented District 20 in Montgomery County, Maryland which includes parts of Burtonsville, Takoma Park, and Silver Spring neighborhoods of Hillandale, Woodmoor, White Oak, Indian Springs, East Silver Spring, and Colesville. Hixson was the first female chairman of the House Ways & Means Committee.

Hixson initially intended to stay in politics for only two years, but on retirement was the longest serving woman in the House. She served in a number of roles and supported progressive values and introduced laws in favour of gun control, same-sex rights, and tax reform. She announced her retirement in 2017.

== Background ==
Hixson was born and raised in L'Anse, Michigan. Members of her family worked in the mills (as did she during summer vacations) and were members of local unions. She attended public high school and later Northern Michigan University. Upon graduation, she became a Head Start teacher in the Detroit School System. In the early 1960s she became active in her community and campaigned for U.S. Representative William D. Ford of Michigan. When asked to continue working on his staff, she moved to the Washington D.C. metropolitan area. She was then recruited to work as an aide for the Democratic National Committee. There, she learned about choices and freedoms within the context of the socially and politically changing 1960s. She observed the desirability of collaboration and learned the fine art of negotiation. While employed as a legislative representative for the American Psychological Association, she became active in her community and was elected to the Montgomery County Democratic Central Committee. Hixson has four children, including a son who died by suicide in 2009.

== Maryland General Assembly ==
In 1976, Hixson was elected a member of the Maryland House of Delegates in Annapolis after being asked by Democratic Party leaders to fill a recently vacated seat. At the time, women were only 10.6 percent of the legislature. Her first committee assignment was the House Environmental Matters Committee, followed by becoming the first female chair of the Ways & Means Committee. In 1993 she was appointed chair of the Ways & Means Committee becoming the highest ranked woman delegate in the General Assembly. In this role, she was responsible for state and local taxation matters; education programs and financing; elections; transportation funding; lottery and horse racing; and issues relating to children youth and families. Hixson announced her retirement in November 2017. At the time, she was the longest-serving woman in the General Assembly.

== Political accomplishments ==
Hixs has been described as an "outspoken progressive" on policy, including same-sex rights and gun control. She is reputed for having had a pragmatic approach to politics and being "on the cutting edge of social change".

=== Education ===
Hixson has stated public education to be the most important issue facing Maryland. Former House Majority Leader John Hurson served with Hixson for 15 years, describing her as a "constant defender" of education in Maryland education. Hixson was a member of Maryland's "Thornton Commission" and one of the original supporters of the five-year Bridge to Excellence Plan for public primary and secondary education. Maryland became the first State in the country to endorse a comprehensive reform of its school finance system based on principles of adequacy and equity without being forced to do so by a court order. Once enacted, additional funds were included in the 2008 budget to accommodate the Geographic Cost of Education Index, a concept promoted by Hixson. This legislation allows localities to secure funds based on specific costs related to its county or locale. Hixson has been a continuous sponsor of the Tuition Affordability Act which freezes in-state undergraduate tuition increases for 2006, 2007. The legislation was expanded further into 2008 by governor Martin O'Malley.

=== Health ===
Hixson introduced legislation for Universal Newborn Hearing Screening making Maryland the 13th state to mandate hearing testing for all babies born in the State. In addition, Hixson's legislation established the Hearing Aid Loaner Program and mandated insurance coverage for children's hearing aids. She sponsored the Spinal Cord Regeneration Trust fund to provide for research to develop new therapies to restore neurological function in individuals with spinal cord injuries, the Senior Prescription Drug Act, and a funding formula legislation for infants and toddlers.

=== Social issues ===
Hixson has supported reform enabling tax credit benefits for the disadvantaged. She has also shown support for same-sex couples in voting against a bill designed to keep the issue alive by Republican lawmakers. She also sponsored legislation which made Maryland the first state to require that all handguns be sold with built-in locks.

=== Elections ===
Sheila Hixson sponsored legislation making Maryland the first state to enter into an Interstate Compact Agreement to Elect the President by Popular Vote which takes effect when signed by enough states to reach the 270 electoral votes necessary to elect a president. In the same year, Hixson sponsored legislation that provided a "voter-verifiable" paper trail ensuring a physical record of votes.

== Personal life and death ==
Hixson died on November 6, 2022, at the age of 89.
