= 2014 Maryland gubernatorial election =

- November 4, 2014
- Turnout: 47.23% ▼6.79%
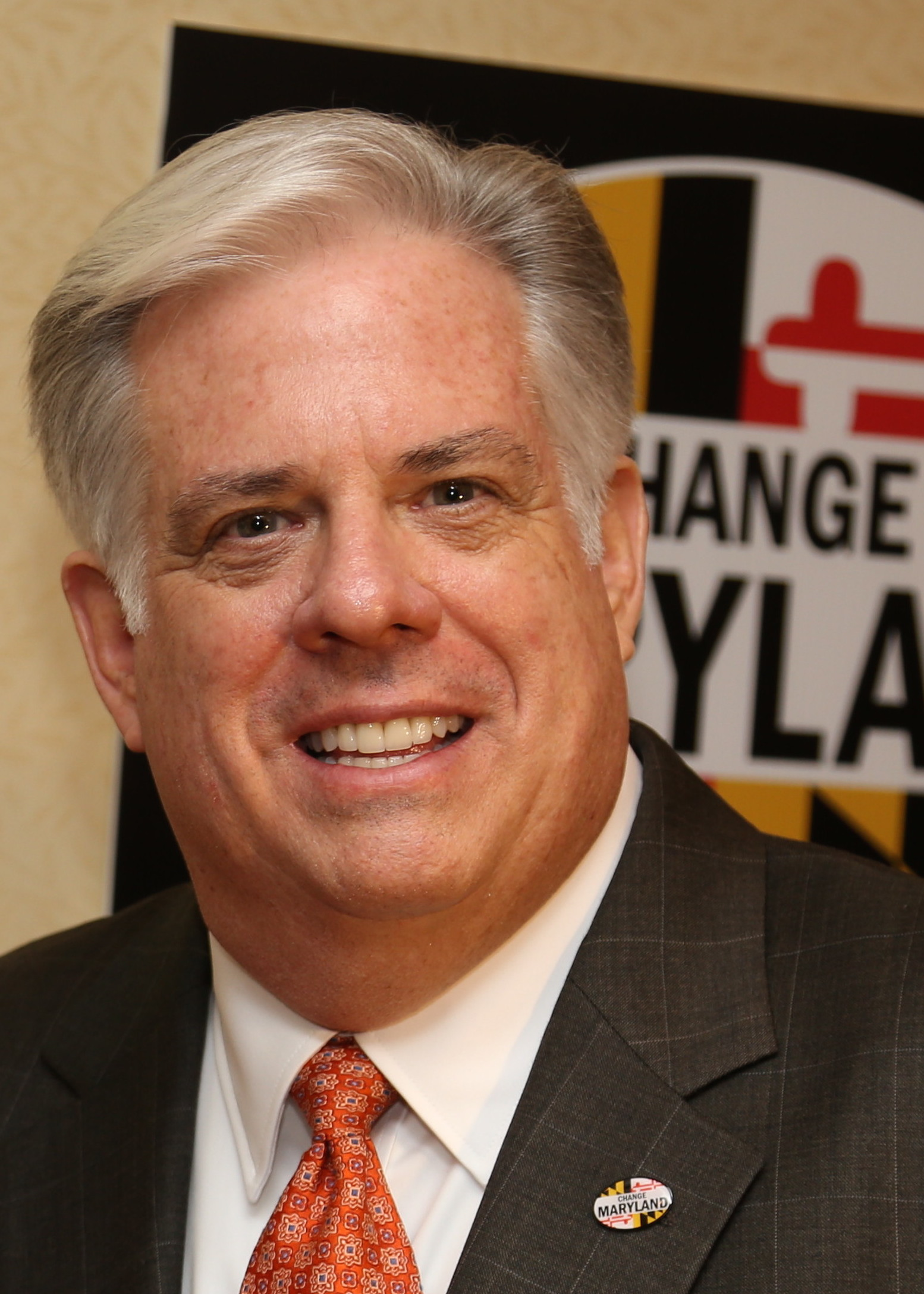

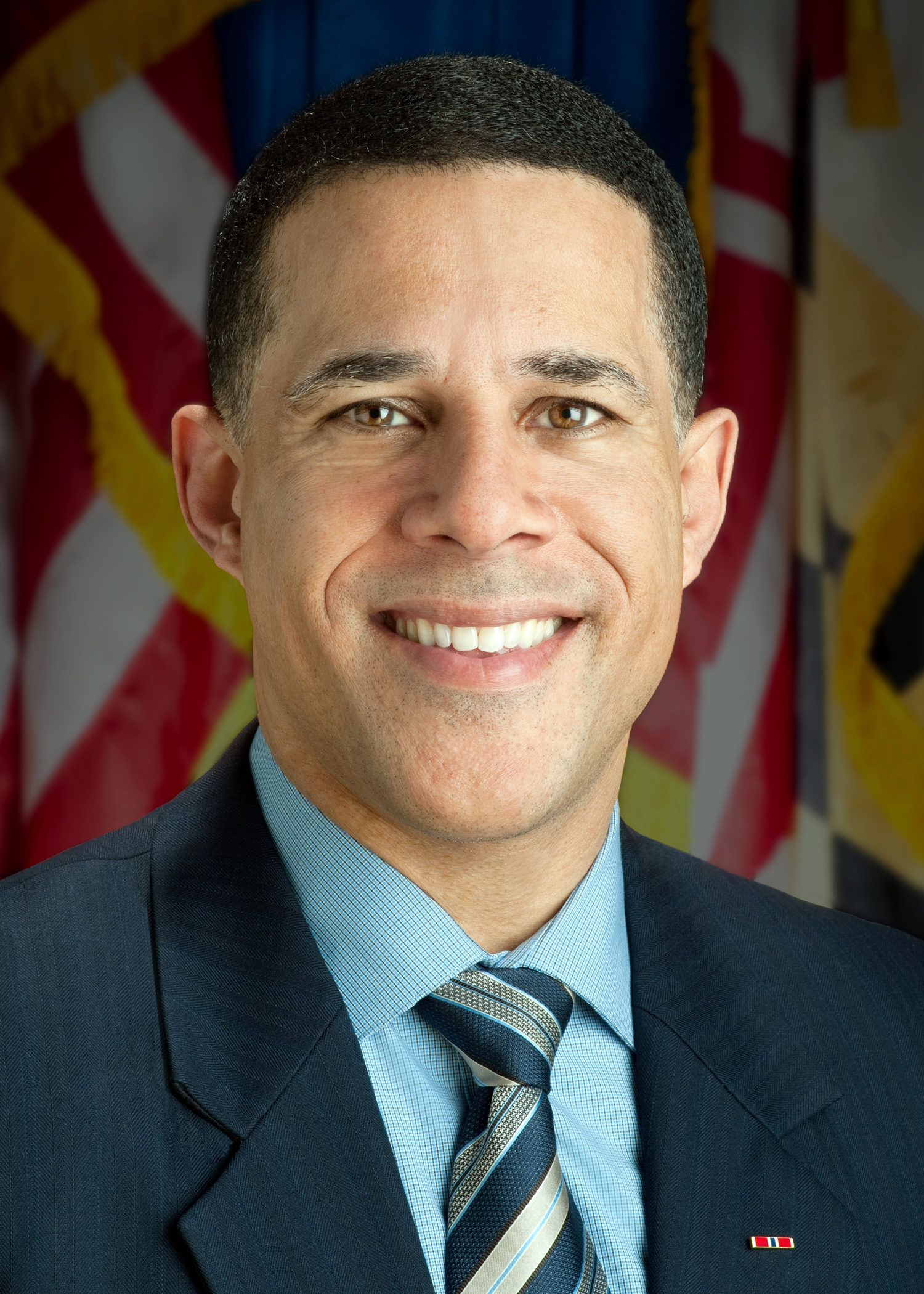
Nominee	Larry Hogan	Anthony Brown
Party	Republican	Democratic
Running mate	Boyd Rutherford	Kenneth Ulman
Popular vote	884,400	818,890
Percentage	51.03%	47.25%
- Hogan: 40–50% 50–60% 60–70% 70–80% 80–90% >90% Brown: 40–50% 50–60% 60–70% 70–80% 80–90% >90% Tie: 50%
Governor before election
Martin O'Malley
Democratic
Elected Governor
Larry Hogan
Republican

The 2014 Maryland gubernatorial election took place on November 4, 2014, to elect the governor and lieutenant governor of Maryland. Incumbent Democratic governor Martin O'Malley was term-limited and could not run for a third consecutive term.

Gubernatorial candidates pick their running mates, with the two then running together on the same ticket. Primary elections were held on June 24, 2014. The Democrats nominated incumbent lieutenant governor Anthony Brown and Howard County Executive Kenneth Ulman, while the Republicans nominated former State Secretary of Appointments Larry Hogan, and former State Secretary of General Services and former Assistant U.S. Secretary of Agriculture for Administration Boyd Rutherford.

Brown predicted that winning the general election would be just "a little bit of a molehill", but he lost to Hogan by a margin of 65,510 votes in the Democratic-leaning state. The Washington Post called the result "a stunning upset" and Republican Governors Association Chair Chris Christie called it "the biggest upset in the entire country." As of 2026, this is the last Maryland gubernatorial election where the winner received less than 55% of the votes. In 2022, Brown ran successfully for Maryland attorney general after serving in the U.S. House of Representatives from 2017 to 2023.

== Background ==
Maryland is considered one of the most Democratic states in the country, and Bob Ehrlich, elected in 2002, had been the only Republican elected governor of Maryland since Spiro Agnew in 1966. Ehrlich was defeated for reelection in 2006 by Baltimore Mayor Martin O'Malley and lost a rematch with O'Malley by a wider margin in 2010.

== Democratic primary ==
=== Candidates ===
==== Declared ====
- Anthony Brown, lieutenant governor of Maryland

- Running mate: Kenneth Ulman, Howard County executive

- Doug Gansler, attorney general of Maryland

- Running mate: Jolene Ivey, state delegate

- Ralph Jaffe, teacher and perennial candidate

- Running mate: Freda Jaffe, sister of Ralph Jaffe

- Heather Mizeur, state delegate

- Running mate: Delman Coates, senior pastor of the Mt. Ennon Baptist Church

- Charles U. Smith, perennial candidate

- Running mate: Clarence Tucker

- Cindy Walsh, blogger

- Running mate: Mary Elizabeth Wingate-Pennacchia

==== Declined ====
- John Delaney, U.S. representative (ran for re-election)
- Peter Franchot, comptroller of Maryland (ran for re-election)
- Dutch Ruppersberger, U.S. representative (ran for re-election)
- Kenneth Ulman, Howard County executive (ran for lieutenant governor on Anthony Brown's ticket)

=== Endorsements ===
Anthony Brown
National leaders
- Bill Clinton, former president of the United States
- Barack Obama, president of the United States
- Michelle Obama, First Lady of the United States

Federal legislators

- Ben Cardin, U.S. senator from Maryland
- Elijah Cummings, U.S. representative for Maryland's 7th congressional district
- Donna Edwards, U.S. representative for Maryland's 4th congressional district
- Steny Hoyer, House minority whip and U.S. representative for Maryland's 5th congressional district
- Barbara Mikulski, U.S. senator from Maryland
- John Sarbanes, U.S. representative for Maryland's 3rd congressional district

State-level politicians

- J. Joseph Curran Jr., former attorney general of Maryland
- Martin O'Malley, incumbent governor
- Stephen H. Sachs, former attorney general of Maryland

State legislators

- Curt Anderson, state delegate, chair of the Baltimore City Delegation
- Joanne C. Benson, state senator (Prince George's Co.)
- John L. Bohanan Jr., state delegate (St. Mary's Co.)
- Talmadge Branch, state delegate (Baltimore City)
- Michael E. Busch, speaker of the Maryland House of Delegates
- Joan Carter Conway, state senator (Baltimore City)
- Norman Conway, state delegate and chair of the House Appropriations Committee (Wicomico and Worcester Cos.)
- Ulysses Currie, state senator (Prince George's Co.)
- Dereck E. Davis, state delegate and chair of the House Economic Matters Committee (Prince George's Co.)
- Barbara A. Frush, state delegate (Prince George's Co.)
- Lisa Gladden, state senator (Baltimore City)
- Cheryl Glenn, state delegate (Baltimore City)
- Guy Guzzone, state delegate (Howard County)
- Keith Haynes, state delegate (Baltimore City)
- Anne Healey, state delegate (Prince George's Co.)
- Marvin E. Holmes Jr., state delegate (Prince George's Co.)
- Carolyn J. B. Howard, state delegate (Prince George's Co.)
- James W. Hubbard, state delegate (Prince George's Co.)
- Sally Y. Jameson, state delegate (Charles Co.)
- Adrienne A. Jones, state delegate (Baltimore County)
- Verna Jones-Rodwell, state senator (Baltimore City)
- Nancy J. King, state senator (Montgomery County)
- Maggie McIntosh, state delegate and chair of the House Environmental Committee (Baltimore City)
- Thomas M. Middleton, state senator
- Thomas V. Miller Jr., president of the Maryland Senate
- Nathaniel T. Oaks, state delegate (Baltimore City)
- Douglas J. J. Peters, state senator
- Catherine E. Pugh, state senator (Baltimore City)
- James N. Robey, state senator (Montgomery County)
- Barbara Robinson, state delegate (Baltimore City)
- James Rosapepe, state senator (Montgomery County)
- Samuel Rosenberg, state delegate (Baltimore City)
- Melvin Stukes, state delegate (Baltimore City)
- Michael G. Summers, state delegate (Prince George's Co.)
- Darren Swain, state delegate (Prince George's Co.)
- Veronica L. Turner, state delegate (Prince George's Co.)
- Kris Valderrama, state delegate (Prince George's Co.)
- Michael L. Vaughn, state delegate (Prince George's Co.)
- Alonzo T. Washington, state delegate (Prince George's Co.)

Local elected officials

- Vicki Almond, Baltimore County Council
- Angela Alsobrooks, Prince George's state's attorney
- Vernon Archer, mayor of Riverdale Park, Maryland
- Chris Barclay, president, Montgomery County Board of Education
- Cathy Bevins, Baltimore County Council
- Warren M. Branch, Baltimore City Council
- Dario J. Broccolino, Howard County state's attorney
- Sheriff Rex Coffey, Charles County
- William H. Cole IV, Baltimore City Council
- Reuben Collins, vice president, Charles County Board of Commissioners
- Robert W. Curran, Baltimore City Council
- Debra M. Davis, Charles County commissioner
- Derrick Leon Davis, Prince George's County councilmember
- Jake Day, City Council president of Salisbury
- Sheila Finlayson, alderwoman of Annapolis
- Peter Fosselman, mayor of Kensington
- Mel Franklin, Prince George's County Council chair
- Tracey Furman, Kensington Town Council
- Bob Gell, president of Charlestown (Cecil County)
- Brian K. Grim, mayor of Cumberland
- Andrea C. Harrison, Prince George's County Council
- Melvin C. High, Prince George's County sheriff
- Helen Holton, Baltimore City Council
- Dr. Classie G. Hoyle, alderwoman of Annapolis
- Sidney Katz, mayor of Gaithersburg
- Candice Quinn Kelly, president, Charles County Board of Commissioners
- Tim Male, Takoma Park Town Council
- Travis Marion, Rising Sun commissioner, Cecil County
- Sharon Middleton, Baltimore City Council
- Nick Mosby, Baltimore City Council
- Nancy Navarro, Montgomery County Council
- Kenneth Oliver, Baltimore County Council
- Eric C. Olson, Prince George's County councilmember
- Johnny Olszewski Sr., Baltimore County Council
- Ian Pfeiffer, alderman of Annapolis
- James Purnell Jr., Worcester County commissioner
- Stephanie Rawlings-Blake, mayor of Baltimore
- Ed Reisinger, Baltimore City Council
- Craig L. Rice, president of Montgomery County Council
- Hans Riemer, Montgomery County Council
- Kenneth Robinson, Charles County commissioner
- Debbie Rowe, mayor of Marydel (Caroline County)
- Bobby Rucci, Charles County commissioner
- Sheree Sample-Hughes, Wicomico County Council
- Brandon Scott, Baltimore City Council
- Michael Sesma, Gaithersburg Town Council
- Paul Sexton, Kensington Town Council
- Eugenie Shields, Salisbury City Council
- Jeffrey Slavin, mayor of Somerset
- Rochelle "Rikki" Spector, Baltimore City Council
- Karen Toles, Prince George's County Council
- Ingrid M. Turner, Prince George's County Council
- Bruce Wahl, mayor of Chesapeake Beach (Calvert County)
- William "Pete" Welch, Baltimore City Council
- Bernard C. Young, Baltimore City Council president

Organizations

- AFSCME Maryland
- Equality Maryland
- Fraternal Order of Police Howard County Lodge 21
- Fraternal Order of Police Prince George's County Lodge 89
- Laborers International Union of North America
- Maryland Association for Justice PAC
- Maryland Classified Employees Association
- Maryland State Education Association
- Maryland State Police Fraternal Order of Police Lodge 69
- Maryland-DC AFL-CIO
- Professional Fire Fighters of Maryland
- SEIU Maryland-DC State Council
- United Association of Journeymen and Apprentices of the Plumbing and Pipe Fitting Industry of the United States and Canada, Maryland State Council
- United Food and Commercial Workers' Local 400, Local 27, and Local 1994
- VoteVets.org

Newspapers

- The Washington Post
Doug Gansler
Federal legislators
- Joseph Tydings, former U.S. senator

State-level politicians

- Peter Franchot, comptroller of Maryland

State legislators

- Charles E. Barkley, state delegate (Montgomery Co.)
- Alfred C. Carr Jr., state delegate (Montgomery Co.)
- Jennie M. Forehand, state senator (Montgomery Co.)
- Delores G. Kelley, state senator (Baltimore Co.)
- Susan Lee, state delegate (Montgomery Co.)
- Richard Madaleno, state senator (Montgomery Co.)
- Karen S. Montgomery, state senator (Montgomery Co.)
- Luiz R. S. Simmons, state delegate (Montgomery Co.)
- C. T. Wilson, state delegate (Charles Co.)
- Craig Zucker, state delegate (Montgomery Co.)

Local elected officials

- Paul N. Crampton Jr., mayor of Funkstown
- Todd L. Hershey, Washington County treasurer
- Cynthia Kauffman, Boonsboro councilmember
- Skip Kauffman, Boonsboro mayor
- Howard Long, Boonsboro assistant mayor
- Lewis Metzner, Hagerstown councilmember
- Penny Nigh, Hagerstown councilmember
- Homer Schetrompf, Hancock councilmember
- Donald Souders Jr., Smithsburg Council vice president
- Dennis Weaver, clerk of the Circuit Court for Washington County

Organizations

- International Association of Fire Fighters Local 1664, AFL-CIO, CLC
Heather Mizeur
Local elected officials
- Margo Bailey, mayor of Chestertown
- Jason Barnett, Brentwood councilmember
- Jesse Christopherson, Mt. Rainier councilmember
- Mary Pat Clarke, Baltimore councilwoman
- Colleen Clay, former Takoma Park councilwoman
- Megan Cook, Easton Town councilwoman
- Mary Jane Coolen, Cheverly councilmember
- Kay Daniels-Cohen, Takoma Park councilwoman
- Liza Fenton, New Carrollton councilmember
- Carol Fordonski, former Queen Anne's County commissioner
- Wayne Gilchrest, former Republican U.S. representative for Maryland's 1st congressional district
- Seth Grimes, Takoma Park councilman
- Jennifer Jenkins, Glenarden councilmember
- Laura Mitchell, Salisbury City councilwoman
- Jennifer Murphy, Brentwood councilmember
- Patrick Paschall, Hyattsville councilmember
- Kathy Porter, former mayor of Takoma Park
- Hank Prensky, former Takoma Park councilman
- Don Robinson, former Takoma Park councilman
- Harry Sampson, Chesapeake City councilman
- Fred Schultz, Takoma Park councilman
- Terry Seamens, Takoma Park councilman
- Ed Sharp, former mayor of Takoma Park
- Jarrett Smith, Takoma Park councilman
- Reuben Snipper, former Takoma Park Councilman
- Shani Warner, Hyattsville councilmember
- Bruce Williams, mayor of Takoma Park
- Patrick Wojahn, College Park councilmember
- Jacqueline Wood-Dodson, Fairmont Heights councilmember

Civic leaders

- Delman Coates, Prince George County pastor
- Sonja Sohn, actress and founder and chief executive of reWIRED for Change

Organizations

- Blue America
- EMILY's List
- Maryland National Organization for Women
- National Organization for the Reform of Marijuana Laws
- Sierra Club
- Women's Campaign Fund

=== Polling ===
Poll source	Date(s) administered	Sample size	Margin of error	Anthony Brown	Peter Franchot	Doug Gansler	Heather Mizeur	Kenneth Ulman	Other	Undecided
Washington Post	June 5–8, 2014	487	± 5%	46%	—	23%	16%	—	—	16%
Baltimore Sun	May 31 – June 3, 2014	499	± 4.4%	41%	—	20%	15%	—	—	15%
WPA Opinion Research**	May 6–7, 2014	?	± ?	34%	—	20%	7%	—	3%	40%
St. Mary's College	April 10–13, 2014	502	± ?	27.1%	—	10.8%	7.7%	—	—	54.3%
Washington Post	February 13–16, 2014	469	± 5.5%	34%	—	15%	8%	—	—	43%
Baltimore Sun	February 8–12, 2014	500	± 4.4%	35%	—	14%	10%	—	—	40%
Gonzales Research	October 1–14, 2013	403	± 5%	40.7%	—	21.1%	5.2%	—	—	33%
GarinHartYang*	September 11–15, 2013	608	± 4%	43%	—	21%	5%	—	—	31%
GarinHartYang*	September 11–15, 2013	608	± 4%	46%	—	24%	—	—	—	30%
WPA Opinion Research**	September 10–11, 2013	?	± ?	40%	—	22%	7%	—	—	38%
NormingtonPets^	December 3–5, 2012	?	± 4.4%	22%	13%	8%	—	4%	—	53%
GarinHartYang*	September 12–13, 2012	504	± 4.4%	31%	14%	18%	—	4%	—	33%
GarinHartYang*	September 12–13, 2012	504	± 4.4%	37%	—	23%	—	5%	—	35%
GarinHartYang*	September 12–13, 2012	504	± 4.4%	41%	—	25%	—	—	—	34%

- ** Internal poll for the Larry Hogan campaign
- * Internal poll for the Anthony Brown campaign
- ^ Internal poll for the Peter Franchot campaign

=== Results ===
Results by county: Brown: 70–80%; 60–70%; 50–60%; 40–50%; 30–40%; Gansler: 30–40%; Mizeur: 30–40%

Democratic primary results
Party	Candidate	Votes	%
Democratic	Anthony Brown	249,398	51.41
Democratic	Doug Gansler	117,383	24.2
Democratic	Heather Mizeur	104,721	21.59
Democratic	Cindy Walsh	6,863	1.41
Democratic	Charles U. Smith	3,507	0.72
Democratic	Ralph Jaffe	3,221	0.66
Total votes		485,093	100.00

== Republican primary ==
=== Candidates ===
==== Declared ====
- David R. Craig, Harford County executive

- Running mate: Jeannie Haddaway-Riccio, state delegate

- Ron George, state delegate

- Running mate: Shelley Aloi, banking analyst and former Frederick alderman

- Larry Hogan, former state secretary of appointments

- Running mate: Boyd Rutherford, former state secretary of general services and former assistant U.S. secretary of agriculture for administration

- Charles Lollar, former chairman of the Charles County Republican Central Committee and nominee for Maryland's 5th congressional district in 2010

- Running mate: Kenneth R. Timmerman, investigative reporter, conservative activist and nominee for Maryland's 8th congressional district in 2012

==== Disqualified ====
- Brian Vaeth, businessman, retired firefighter and candidate for the U.S. Senate in 2012

- Running mate: Duane "Shorty" Davis, activist

==== Withdrew ====
- Blaine Young, president of the Frederick County Board of Commissioners

==== Declined ====
- Dan Bongino, former United States Secret Service agent and nominee for the U.S. Senate in 2012 (ran for Congress)
- Nancy Jacobs, state senator
- John R. Leopold, former Anne Arundel County executive
- Marty Madden, former state senator
- Meyer Marks, political activist
- E. J. Pipkin, minority leader of the Maryland Senate and nominee for the U.S. Senate in 2004
- Michael Steele, former lieutenant governor, nominee for the U.S. Senate in 2006 and former chairman of the Republican National Committee

=== Endorsements ===
David R. Craig
- Jeannie Haddaway-Riccio, state delegate (Talbot Co.)
- Kathy Szeliga, state delegate (Baltimore and Harford Co.)
Larry Hogan

State officials

- Jeb Bush, former governor of Florida
- Chris Christie, governor of New Jersey, RGA chairman
- Bob Ehrlich, former governor of Maryland
- Tom Ridge, former governor of Pennsylvania and U.S. secretary of Homeland Security
- Mitt Romney, former governor of Massachusetts and 2012 Republican nominee for president of the United States

Organizations

- Red Maryland, conservative blog
Charles Lollar
- Blaine Young, president of the Frederick County Board of Commissioners

=== Polling ===
Poll source	Date(s) administered	Sample size	Margin of error	David Craig	Ron George	Larry Hogan	Charles Lollar	Other	Undecided
Washington Post	June 5–8, 2014	228	± 7.5%	19%	5%	35%	13%	3%	29%
Baltimore Sun	May 31 – June 3, 2014	501	± 4.4%	12%	6%	27%	12%	—	37%
St. Mary's College	April 10–13, 2014	270	± ?	7.8%	3.8%	16%	3.8%	—	68.6%
Washington Post	February 13–16, 2014	290	± 7%	13%	4%	17%	10%	1%	57%
Baltimore Sun	February 8–12, 2014	499	± 4.4%	7%	6%	13%	5%	—	69%

=== Debate ===
2014 Maryland gubernatorial election Republican primary debate
No.	Date	Host	Moderator	Link	Republican	Republican	Republican	Republican
Key: P Participant A Absent N Not invited I Invited W Withdrawn								
Key: P Participant A Absent N Not invited I Invited W Withdrawn					David R. Craig	Ron George	Larry Hogan	Charles Lollar
1	Jun. 6, 2014	Maryland Public Television			P	P	P	P

=== Results ===
Results by county: Hogan: 50–60%; 40–50%; <40%; Craig: 30–40%; 40–50%; 50–60%; 60–70%; 70–80%; Lollar: 50–60%

Republican primary results
Party	Candidate	Votes	%
Republican	Larry Hogan	92,376	42.98
Republican	David R. Craig	62,639	29.14
Republican	Charles Lollar	33,292	15.49
Republican	Ron George	26,628	12.39
Total votes		214,935	100.00

== General election ==
=== Candidates ===
- Anthony Brown (Democratic Party), lieutenant governor of Maryland

- Running mate: Kenneth Ulman, Howard County executive

- Larry Hogan (Republican Party), former state secretary of appointments

- Running mate: Boyd Rutherford, former state secretary of general services, and former assistant U.S. secretary of agriculture for administration

- Shawn Quinn (Libertarian Party), candidate for the House of Delegates in 2010

- Running mate: Lorenzo Gaztanaga, perennial candidate

=== Campaign ===
Hogan heavily criticized Brown for his handling of Maryland's health care exchange as a part of the Affordable Care Act, labeling him as "the most incompetent man in Maryland." The Maryland Health Benefit Exchange enrolled fewer than 4,000 people.

Hogan avoided social issues by promising not to touch the state's abortion or gun control laws. Campaign ads were a significant part of the first debate, culminating in Hogan's call for Brown to "apologize to the women of Maryland for trying to scare them."

Brown pledged no new taxes, no increased taxes, and a look at state spending if elected. Hogan responded by citing O'Malley/Brown's same claim in the 2010 election and how that claim was followed by "40 consecutive tax hikes." Brown said there have been times he has disagreed with O'Malley, like on mortgage reduction. "Brown did not stay to take questions from reporters", and both candidates accused the other of not telling the truth.

=== Debates ===
- Complete video of debate, October 7, 2014 – C-SPAN
- Complete video of debate, October 18, 2014 – YouTube

=== Predictions ===
Source	Ranking	As of
The Cook Political Report	Tossup	November 3, 2014
Sabato's Crystal Ball	Lean D	November 3, 2014
Rothenberg Political Report	Tilt D	November 3, 2014
Real Clear Politics	Tossup	November 3, 2014

=== Polling ===
Poll source	Date(s) administered	Sample size	Margin of error	Anthony Brown (D)	Larry Hogan (R)	Other	Undecided
WPA Opinion Research*	October 20–24, 2014	500	± 3.5%	39%	44%	—	17%
Gonzales Research	October 20–24, 2014	822	± 3.5%	46%	44%	2%	18%
CBS News/NYT/YouGov	October 16–23, 2014	1,086	± 5%	51%	38%	0%	11%
WPA Opinion Research*	October 19–20, 2014	500	± 4.4%	42%	41%	—	15%
Gravis Marketing	October 6–9, 2014	784	± 3.5%	46%	43%	—	11%
Baltimore Sun	October 4–8, 2014	800	± 3.5%	49%	42%	—	9%
Washington Post	October 2–5, 2014	549 LV	± 5%	47%	38%	4%	11%
Washington Post	October 2–5, 2014	807 RV	± 4%	44%	31%	6%	19%
CBS News/NYT/YouGov	September 20 – October 1, 2014	1,096	± 4%	55%	38%	1%	7%
Gonzales Research	September 16–23, 2014	805	± 3.5%	47%	43%	1%	9%
CBS News/NYT/YouGov	August 18 – September 2, 2014	1,082	± 4%	51%	37%	3%	10%
OnMessage, Inc.*	August 18–19, 2014	500	± 4.38	45%	42%	4%	9%
CBS News/NYT/YouGov	July 5–24, 2014	1,409	± ?	52%	39%	2%	6%
Rasmussen Reports	July 9–10, 2014	750	± 4%	48%	35%	7%	10%
Washington Post	June 5–8, 2014	962	± 3.5%	51%	33%	—	16%
WPA Opinion Research*	May 6–7, 2014	400	± 4.9%	42%	35%	—	23%
WPA Opinion Research*	September 10–11, 2013	?	± ?	46%	32%	—	

- * Internal poll for the Larry Hogan campaign

=== Results ===

2014 Maryland gubernatorial election
Party	Candidate	Votes	%	±%
Republican	Larry Hogan	884,400	51.03%	+9.24%
Democratic	Anthony Brown	818,890	47.25%	−8.99%
Libertarian	Shawn Quinn	25,382	1.46%	+0.70%
Write-in		4,505	0.26%	+0.15%
Total votes		1,733,177	100.00%	N/A
Republican gain from Democratic				

==== By county ====
County	Brown	Votes	Hogan	Votes	Others	Votes	Totals
Allegany	22.60%	4,629	75.25%	15,410	2.14%	439	20,478
Anne Arundel	32.16%	58,001	66.10%	119,195	1.74%	3,142	180,338
Baltimore	38.89%	102,734	59.03%	155,936	2.07%	5,473	264,143
Baltimore City	75.50%	106,213	21.92%	30,845	2.58%	3,628	140,686
Calvert	29.11%	9,579	69.11%	22,739	1.78%	586	32,904
Caroline	20.97%	1,931	77.58%	7,144	1.44%	133	9,208
Carroll	16.07%	10,349	82.20%	52,951	1.74%	1,119	64,419
Cecil	20.43%	5,467	77.33%	20,699	2.24%	600	26,766
Charles	51.83%	24,601	46.91%	22,268	1.26%	600	47,469
Dorchester	30.51%	3,252	68.26%	7,276	1.24%	132	10,660
Frederick	34.57%	27,682	63.34%	50,715	2.09%	1,675	80,072
Garrett	17.80%	1,634	79.71%	7,319	2.49%	229	9,182
Harford	21.66%	19,814	76.52%	69,986	1.82%	1,660	91,460
Howard	46.68%	49,227	51.54%	54,353	1.78%	1,873	105,453
Kent	33.56%	2,603	64.58%	5,009	1.86%	144	7,756
Montgomery	61.81%	163,694	36.75%	97,312	1.44%	3,813	264,819
Prince George's	84.23%	184,950	14.86%	32,619	0.91%	2,003	219,572
Queen Anne's	19.34%	3,757	79.46%	15,436	1.20%	233	19,426
St. Mary's	25.20%	8,203	72.72%	23,675	2.09%	679	32,557
Somerset	31.86%	2,135	66.38%	4,448	1.16%	78	6,701
Talbot	29.03%	4,420	69.72%	10,616	1.25%	190	15,226
Washington	24.89%	9,661	73.33%	28,469	1.78%	691	38,821
Wicomico	34.07%	8,833	64.30%	16,669	1.63%	422	25,924
Worcester	28.85%	5,521	69.35%	13,271	1.80%	345	19,137

Counties that flipped from Democratic to Republican

- Baltimore County (largest municipality: Dundalk)
- Howard (largest municipality: Columbia)

==== By congressional district ====
Hogan won five of eight congressional districts, including four that elected Democrats.

District	Brown	Hogan	Representative
1st	20%	78%	Andy Harris
2nd	41%	57%	Dutch Ruppersberger
3rd	43%	55%	John Sarbanes
4th	65%	34%	Donna Edwards
5th	51%	47%	Steny Hoyer
6th	40%	58%	John Delaney
7th	60%	38%	Elijah Cummings
8th	49%	50%	Chris Van Hollen

== See also ==
- 2014 United States elections
- 2014 Maryland Attorney General election
- 2014 Maryland Comptroller election
