= 2017 California Democratic Party chairmanship election =

An election for the chairmanship of the California Democratic Party was held on May 20, 2017, to succeed outgoing John Burton. 2 candidates, Eric C. Bauman and Kimberly Ellis, contested for the position. Bauman was elected as Chair of the Party.

== Candidates ==
- Eric C. Bauman, vice chair of the state party (2009–2017) and Chair of the Los Angeles Democratic Party (2000–2017)
- Kimberly Ellis, former member of California Democratic Party Finance Committee, former CDP African American Caucus Recording Secretary

== Endorsements ==
Bauman received the endorsements of Equality California.

Ellis was supported by progressive groups like the California Nurses Association, which supported Bernie Sanders in the Democratic presidential primary, and Our Revolution, which grew out of the Sanders campaign. She was narrowly defeated by Eric Bauman, who has been described as a "consummate party insider." News reports have described the contest as being between "old school" Democrats vs "new school" Democrats in the progressive spirit of Bernie Sanders. Although Ellis supported Clinton in the Democratic primaries and the 2016 general election, she has been embraced by Bernie supporters as "leading an insurgency against the party establishment." The most contentious issue, according to the Associated Press, was single-payer health care, which Ellis supported. She was endorsed by seven members of US Congress, several unions and organizations including the National Nurses United union, Lt. Governor Gavin Newsom, dozens of local elected and emeritus officials, and dozens of California Democratic Party leaders. Most of the graduates of Emerge California did not endorse Ellis, and actually endorsed Ellis' opponent. Ellis lost the election by 2.12%.

== Result ==
On May 20, 2017, Bauman was elected Chair of the California Democratic Party at the annual state convention. He was the first openly gay and Jewish person to serve as Chair of the Party.
