= Kimberly Ellis =

American politician

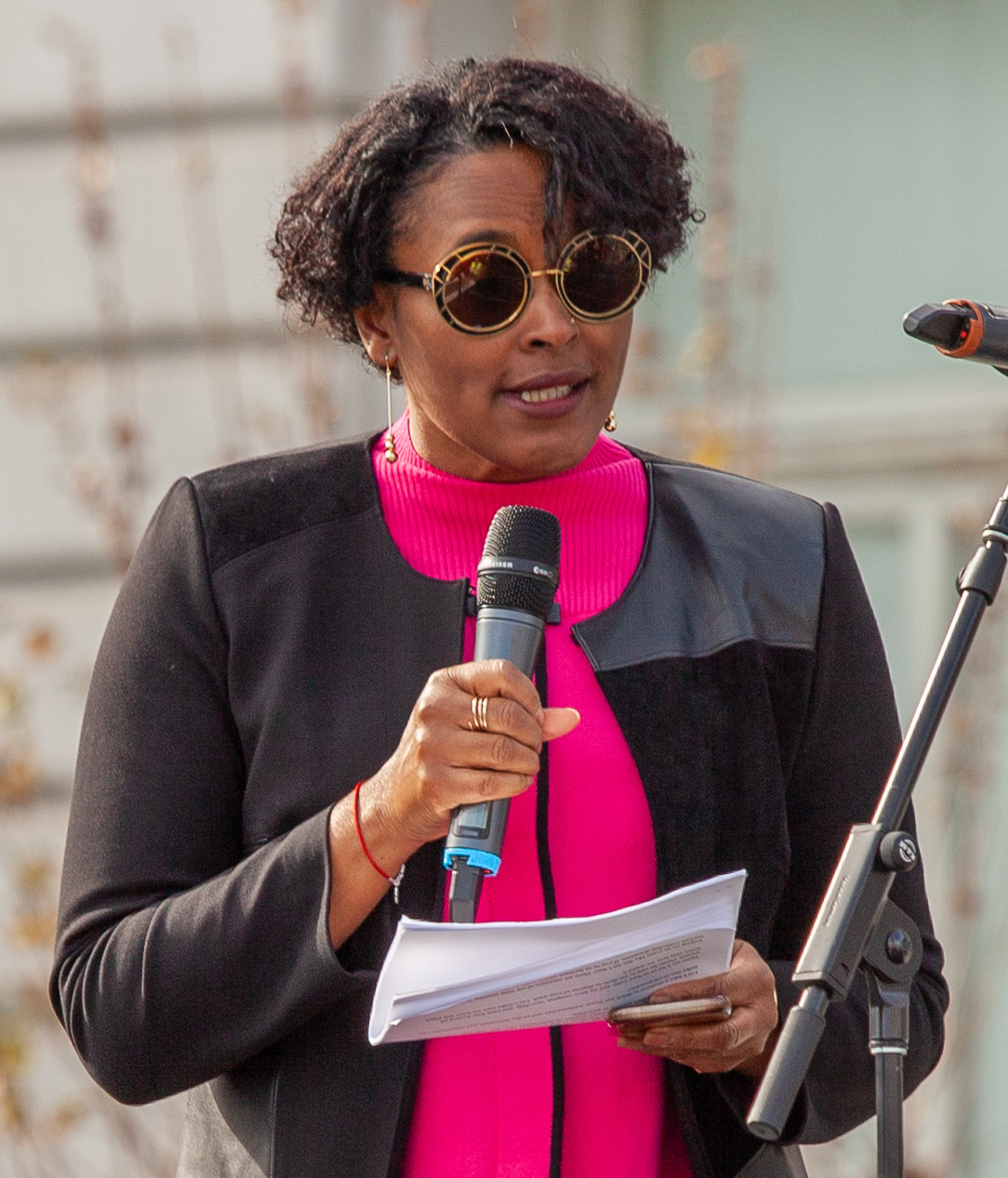
- Ellis speaking at the 2020 Women's March in San Francisco

Personal details
- Born: Chattanooga, Tennessee, U.S.
- Party: Democratic
- Education: Jacksonville University (BA); John F. Kennedy University (JD)
- Website: Campaign website

Kimberly Ellis is an American activist and was the executive director of Emerge California from 2010 until she ran for the Chair of the California Democratic Party in 2017. Ellis is considered a progressive Democrat and formerly served on the California Democratic Party Finance Committee and also on the California Democratic Party's African American Caucus as Recording Secretary. Ellis ran for the Chair of the California Democratic Party in 2017, losing to party insider Eric Bauman.

== Early life and education ==
Ellis was born in Chattanooga, Tennessee, and attended nine schools during her childhood as her father moved regularly in his career as a military officer. She attended schools in six different US states and two countries before she graduated from Antilles High School at Fort Buchanan near San Juan, Puerto Rico.

Ellis attended Jacksonville University and earned a bachelor's degree in English. She then graduated from law school at John F. Kennedy University.

== Activism and political career ==
Ellis has worked in the private and non-profit sectors, and has experience in state government.

In 2009, the mayor of Richmond, California appointed Ellis to serve as a member of the Community Development Commission.

Ellis concurrently worked at Emerge America's national headquarters as the National Affiliate Director, and in 2010 she became the executive director of the California chapter, Emerge California.

Ellis is a Truman National Security Project political partner.

Ellis has spoken in favor of progressive causes and has stated that Democrats need to do more to address poverty as well as push harder to adopt single-payer healthcare. Ellis actively supported Hillary Clinton during the presidential campaign.

Ellis formerly served on the California Democratic Party Finance Committee, and as the Recording Secretary of the party's African American Caucus.

Ellis was a contender for the Chair of the California Democratic Party in 2017. She was endorsed by seven members of US Congress, several unions and organizations including the National Nurses United union, Lt. Governor Gavin Newsom, dozens of local elected and emeritus officials, and dozens of California Democratic Party leaders. She was supported by progressive groups like California Nurses Association, which supported Bernie Sanders in the Democratic presidential primary, and Our Revolution, which grew out of the Sanders campaign.

Ellis was narrowly defeated by party insider Eric Bauman, who has been described as a "consummate party insider." According to the Los Angeles Times, Ellis and Bauman were aligned on most issues, including support for a path to citizenship for undocumented immigrants, abortion rights, single-payer healthcare, and stronger LGBTQ protections, and the contest was described as being between "old school" Democrats vs "new school" Democrats in the progressive spirit of Bernie Sanders. Although Ellis supported Clinton in the Democratic primaries and in the 2016 general election, she has been welcomed by Bernie supporters as "leading an insurgency against the party establishment." Despite such a strong showing in 2017, she was defeated again in 2019 by Rusty Hicks after Eric Bauman resigned following sexual misconduct allegations.

== Honors ==
Ellis was the Women's History Month Honoree by the San Francisco Commission and department on the Status of Women in 2011 and 2015.

Ellis received honors on International Women's Day in 2012 by the Global Arts and Education.

Kimberly was named one of CalNewsroom.com's 100 Most Overlooked People in California Politics in 2014 for her work electing Democratic women in California. CalNewsroom.com's John Hirabe lauded Ellis as “where the rubber meets the road in electing Democratic women” in California.

In 2012, Kimberly was awarded the Annie M. Powell Community Leadership Award by the Global Arts and Education and Women's Intercultural Network in celebration of International Women's Day for her work with Emerge California.

== Controversies ==
Kimberly Ellis, as a head of San Francisco's Department on the Status of Women, was placed on administrative leave in March 2025 pending a city probe into the department's activities and that she directed nearly $1 million in taxpayer money in no-bid contracts to groups she'd worked for or consulted for in the past. The department paid a political organization focused on empowering women, almost $700,000 to organize the Shift Happens conference at the Moscone Center in 2024. “Expenses included a $90,000 catering tab, $120,000 for video production, $25,000 for exhibitions and educational materials, and $70,000 for administrative expenses”, according to The San Francisco Standard.

== Personal life ==
Kimberly has lived in California for over two decades. She lives in Richmond, California, and has two children.
