= Rusty Hicks =

American attorney and activist

Chair of the California Democratic Party
- Incumbent
- Assumed office July 1, 2019
- Preceded by: Alex Gallardo-Rooker (Acting)

Personal details
- Born: 1979 or 1980 (age 46–47) Fort Worth, Texas, U.S.
- Party: Democratic
- Education: Austin College (BA); Loyola Marymount University (JD)

Military service
- Branch/service: United States Navy
- Unit: United States Navy Reserve

Rusty Hicks is an American trade unionist, serving as Chair of the California Democratic Party since 2019. Having succeeded Eric C. Bauman, Hicks unsuccessfully ran for California's 2nd Assembly District in 2024.

== Early life and education ==
Hicks was born in Fort Worth, Texas. He earned a Bachelor of Arts in political science and government from Austin College, before moving to Los Angeles in 2003, where he earned a Juris Doctor from Loyola Law School.

== Career ==
Hicks worked on the Barack Obama 2008 presidential campaign as the California political director.

Hicks also worked as a legislative aide to California Assembly members Mike Gordon and Ted Lieu. From November 2014-November 2019, Hicks served as the president of the Los Angeles County Federation of Labor.

Hicks won the June 4, 2019, CA Democratic Party chairmanship election after the resignation of Eric C. Bauman and was re-elected in 2021, defeating Kimberly Ellis.

In 2021 he moved from the Los Angeles area to Arcata, California.

=== Campaign for State Assembly ===
In December 2023, after Assemblyman Jim Wood in a surprise announcement said he wouldn't be seeking re-election the month prior, Hicks announced his run for the California State Assembly with Wood's endorsement amongst a field of 5 other Democratic candidates. Hicks faced scrutiny and calls for resignation from local Democratic Party leaders with many accusing him of "attempting to carpetbag his way into the State Legislature" and for refusing to step aside as Chair while campaigning for office, but agreeing to recuse himself from matters relating to the District. The Hicks campaign received strong support from many statewide leaders and organizations, but failed to gain the needed support from local leaders and organizations within the District with much of it going to Santa Rosa city councilmember Chris Rogers, who was seen as the frontrunner and the progressive candidate in the race with Hicks seen as the moderate. Hicks ultimately ended up in 3rd place in the March 5 jungle primary behind a Republican school board trustee from Del Norte, Michael Greer, and Rogers. Rogers went on to win in the November 5 General Election by a 65.9% to 34.1% margin.

== Electoral history ==
=== 2024 ===
2024 California State Assembly 2nd district election
Primary election
Party	Candidate	Votes	%
Republican	Michael Greer	39,052	27.6
Democratic	Chris Rogers	27,291	19.3
Democratic	Rusty Hicks	25,962	18.3
Democratic	Ariel Kelley	19,740	14.0
Democratic	Frankie Myers	18,065	12.8
Democratic	Ted Williams	9,803	6.9
Democratic	Cynthia Click	1,575	1.1
Total votes		141,488	100.0
General election
Democratic	Chris Rogers	154,845	65.9
Republican	Michael Greer	80,290	34.1
Total votes		235,135	100.0
Democratic hold			

=== 2025 ===
2025 California Democratic Party Chair election
Candidate	Votes	%
Rusty Hicks	1,490	64.6
Alan Vargas Cerna	602	26.1
Joby Bernstein	213	9.2

Party political offices
Preceded by Alex Gallardo-Rooker; Acting	Chair of the California Democratic Party; 2019–present	Incumbent
