= Andrea Dew Steele =

American activist

- Occupation: Activist

Andrea Dew Steele is an American political activist. She co-founded Emerge California in 2002, and founded Emerge America in 2005. The goal of Emerge is to increase the number of Democratic women in all areas of the government.

== Biography ==
Steele earned a political science B.A. at Tufts University and an international history M.A. from the London School of Economics. Steele was a policy analyst for several years in Washington, D.C., on Capitol Hill, where she helped fundraise for Democratic causes and candidates. Steele was friends with Kamala Harris and helped her in her first race for district attorney and throughout her career. She moved to the San Francisco Bay Area and spent eight years as advisor to Democratic activist and Esprit Clothing co-founder Susie Tompkins Buell.

Steele co-founded Emerge California in 2002, which uses classes and training programs to prepare Democratic women in California to successfully run for office. In 2005, Steele founded Emerge America, a national umbrella organization, and continued to open Emerge affiliates in more states. Steele's short-term goal with Emerge America was to achieve 30% representation of women in politics, as she believes that achieves a critical mass for change. Although the population is 52% women, fewer than a quarter of government officials are women. In addition to writing for publications such as the Huffington Post, Steele appeared on television and radio, including Al Jazeera America and MSNBC to discuss campaigns, current events and politics.
