= Delman Coates =

American pastor

Coordinates: 38°45′14″N 76°55′20.6″W

Delman L. Coates
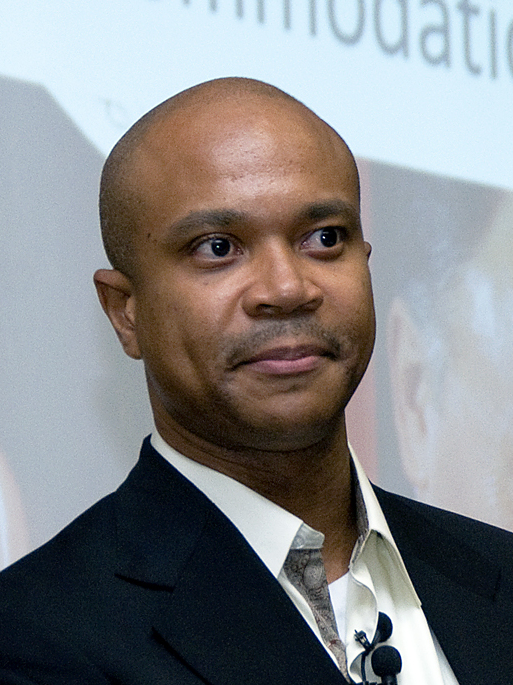
- Coates speaking at a workshop
- Born: January 13, 1973 (age 53); Richmond, Virginia, U.S.
- Education: Columbia University (Ph.D.)(M.Phil.); Harvard Divinity School (M.Div.); Morehouse College (B.A.)
- Children: 4
- Church: Christian, Baptist
- Ordained: 1998
- Congregations served: Mt. Ennon Baptist Church

Delman L. Coates (born January 13, 1973) is an American Baptist minister. He is senior pastor of Mt. Ennon Baptist Church, a megachurch located in Clinton, Maryland, since 2004.

Coates is founder of the Our Money Campaign, an economic justice campaign launched in May 2019. He is founder of the Black Church Center for Justice & Equality. Coates is a board member of the National Action Network.

== Early life and education ==
Coates was born on January 13, 1973, in Richmond, Virginia. He has one sister. He studied Religion at Morehouse College and earned a Bachelor of Arts in 1995, then he studied at Harvard Divinity School and earned a Master of Divinity in 1998. He also studied at Columbia University, earned his Master of Philosophy in Religion in 2002 and his Ph.D. in New Testament and Early Christianity in 2006.

== Ministry ==
In 2004, he became senior pastor of Mt. Ennon Baptist Church, a megachurch located in Clinton, Maryland.

In 2012, Coates announced his support for same-sex marriage. Following this announcement, less than 10 people left the church for this reason while 1,000 people joined the church during that year, a record number of new members for the church.

== Politics ==
Maryland House of Delegates member Heather Mizeur named Coates as her running mate in the 2014 race for governor.

== Published articles ==
- "And the Bible Says: Methodological Tyranny of Biblical Fundamentalism and Historical Criticism" in Blow the Trumpet in Zion (2004)
- "Towards a Progressive Christian Interpretive Praxis" in The African-American Pulpit (2004)
- "Origen of Alexandria" in Union Seminary Quarterly Review (vol. 59:3-4, 2005)

Coates wrote an essay titled “The New Abolitionism: Monetary Reform and the Future of Civil Rights” which appears in the book Mr. President: Interfaith Perspectives on the Historic Presidency of Barack H. Obama (2017).
