= Alex Gallardo-Rooker =

Mexican-American lobbyist and political executive

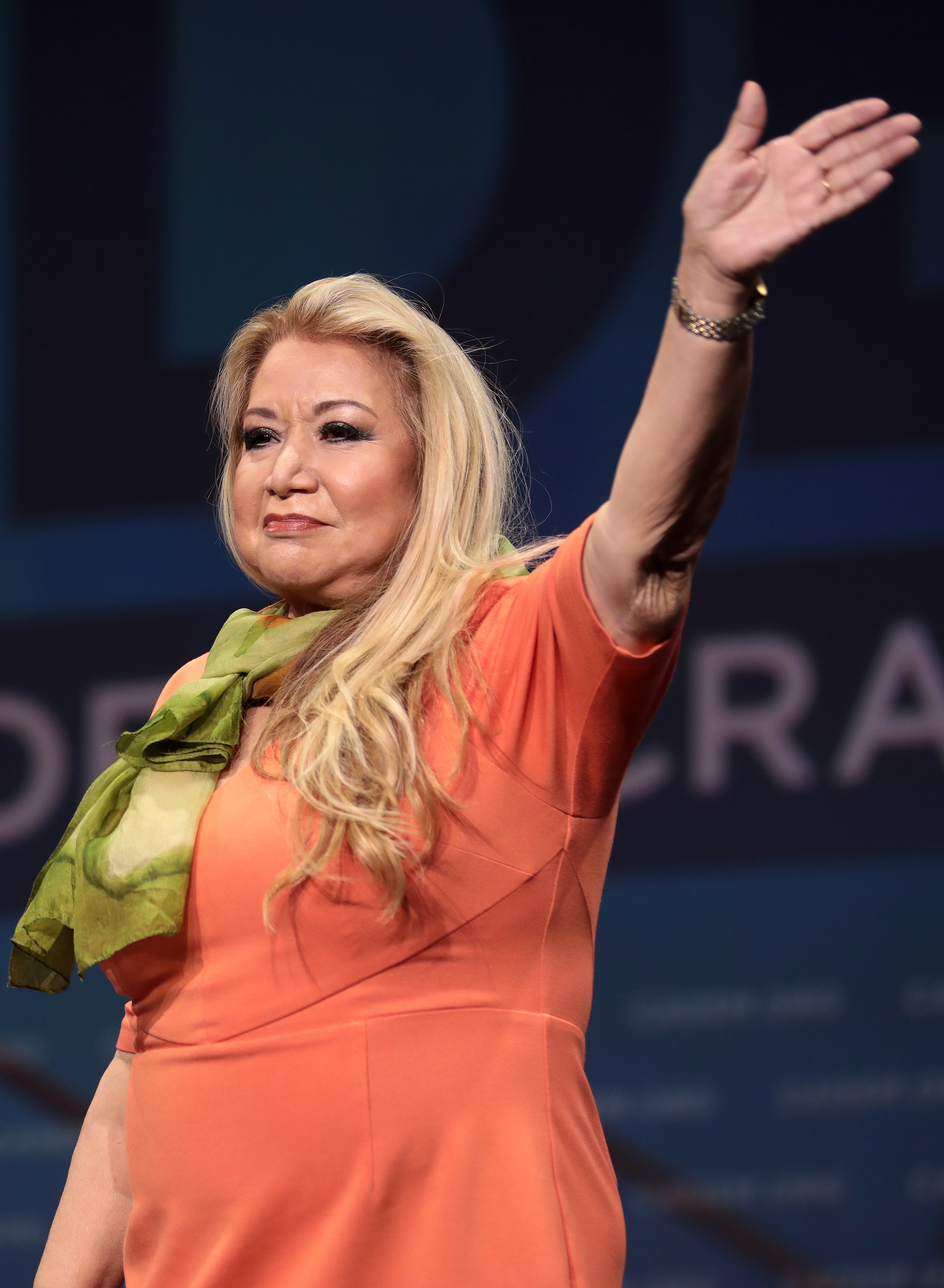

Chair of the California Democratic Party
- Acting
- In office November 29, 2018 – July 1, 2019
- Preceded by: Eric C. Bauman
- Succeeded by: Rusty Hicks

Vice Chair of the California Democratic Party
- In office 1997 – May 1, 2021
- Succeeded by: Betty Yee

Personal details
- Born: Alexandra Gallardo Mexico City, Mexico
- Party: Democratic
- Education: Cypress College

Alexandra "Alex" Gallardo-Rooker is a Mexican-American lobbyist and political executive who served as vice chair of the California Democratic Party from 1997 to 2021. After the resignation of Eric C. Bauman amid sexual assault allegations, Gallardo-Rooker served as acting chair from November 2018 to July 2019, after which Rusty Hicks was elected to serve as chair.

== Early life and education ==
Gallardo-Rooker was born in Mexico City and graduated from Cypress College.

== Career ==
Gallardo-Rooker works as the legislative advocate in California for the Communications Workers of America. She has also worked for the Democratic National Committee, including as an advisor to DNC Chairs Tom Perez and Howard Dean. She has served as vice chair of the California Democratic Party since 1997, and was installed in an acting capacity as chair from November 2018 to July 2019. Gallardo-Rooker supported Hillary Clinton in the 2016 Democratic Party presidential primaries and served as a senior advisor to the Michael Bloomberg 2020 presidential campaign.
