= She Should Run =

American nonpartisan organization encouraging women to run for office

- Formation: 2011; 15 years ago
- Founder: Erin Loos Cutraro
- Type: 501(c)(3) nonprofit
- Purpose: Encouraging women to consider running for public office
- Headquarters: Washington, D.C.
- Founder and CEO: Erin Loos Cutraro
- Website: sheshouldrun.org

She Should Run is an American nonpartisan nonprofit organization, based in Washington, D.C., that aims to increase the number of women who run for elected office in the United States. Rather than training declared candidates, it focuses on women who have not yet decided to run, offering free online resources, courses, and a peer community. Its stated goal is for 250,000 women to run for office by 2030.

== History ==
=== Origins ===
She Should Run began as an initiative connected to the Women's Campaign Fund (WCF), a nonpartisan political action committee founded in 1974 that supports women candidates. In its early years it operated as WCF's affiliated 501(c)(3) organization, carrying out research and education while the PAC made direct contributions to endorsed candidates. In 2012, Ms. described the initiative as led by WCF president Siobhan "Sam" Bennett.

Erin Loos Cutraro, a former political director of WCF, is credited as the organization's founder and dates its launch to 2011. She Should Run later became a standalone organization with Cutraro as its chief executive.

=== Ask a Woman to Run and the Incubator ===
The organization's first major program, Ask a Woman to Run, was an online tool that let people nominate a woman they thought should consider running; She Should Run then contacted the nominees with resources. Cutraro later concluded that encouragement alone was not enough and that women also needed practical guidance after deciding to run.

In 2016, the organization launched the She Should Run Incubator, a free set of online courses on leadership, networking, and communication. It had planned for about 100 participants that year but ended 2016 with roughly 5,500, and more than 130 former participants appeared on ballots in 2018. The group also ran regional cohorts that combined virtual and in-person sessions, and workplace programs with corporate partners.

=== 250K by 2030 ===
Following the 2016 presidential election, She Should Run reported a surge in interest: more than 15,000 women joined its community, of whom about 11,000 said they were planning to run. In response, it launched the "250K by 2030" campaign, setting a goal of 250,000 women running for office by 2030, roughly half of the more than 500,000 elected positions in the United States. The campaign emphasized local offices and mentorship of prospective candidates by women already in leadership. In 2020, the organization planned a national tour of in-person networking and education events called Road to Run.

=== Civic engagement programs (2025–present) ===
In April 2025, She Should Run launched She Will Fight, a project offering women a catalog of local civic actions; the organization reported that about 18,500 women joined within weeks. Cutraro described the project as an extension of the group's mission, on the premise that local civic engagement is a common path to elected office. In October 2025, it began the Local Leader Lab, a 12-week part-time virtual program for women preparing to take on local leadership roles.

== Approach ==
She Should Run is nonpartisan and works with women across the political spectrum. As a 501(c)(3) charity, it does not endorse candidates or give them financial support. Its work centers on what it calls the "pre-candidacy" stage, the period before a woman decides to run. Cutraro has said that the largest barrier for prospective candidates is self-doubt about their qualifications, and that fundraising is also a hurdle for many. Cutraro has cited research indicating that, on average, only about one in eight women who consider running goes on to file for office.

Its funders have included Lush's Charity Pot program.

== Reach ==
Around 2019, She Should Run said it had encouraged more than 26,000 women to consider running for office; by 2022 the figure it reported had grown to more than 40,000. In its 2025 impact report, the organization said more than 58,000 women had taken a first step toward public leadership through its programs that year.

== See also ==
- Emerge America
- EMILY's List
- Women's Campaign Fund
- Women in the United States House of Representatives
