= Anthony Brown (Maryland politician) =

American lawyer and politician (born 1961)

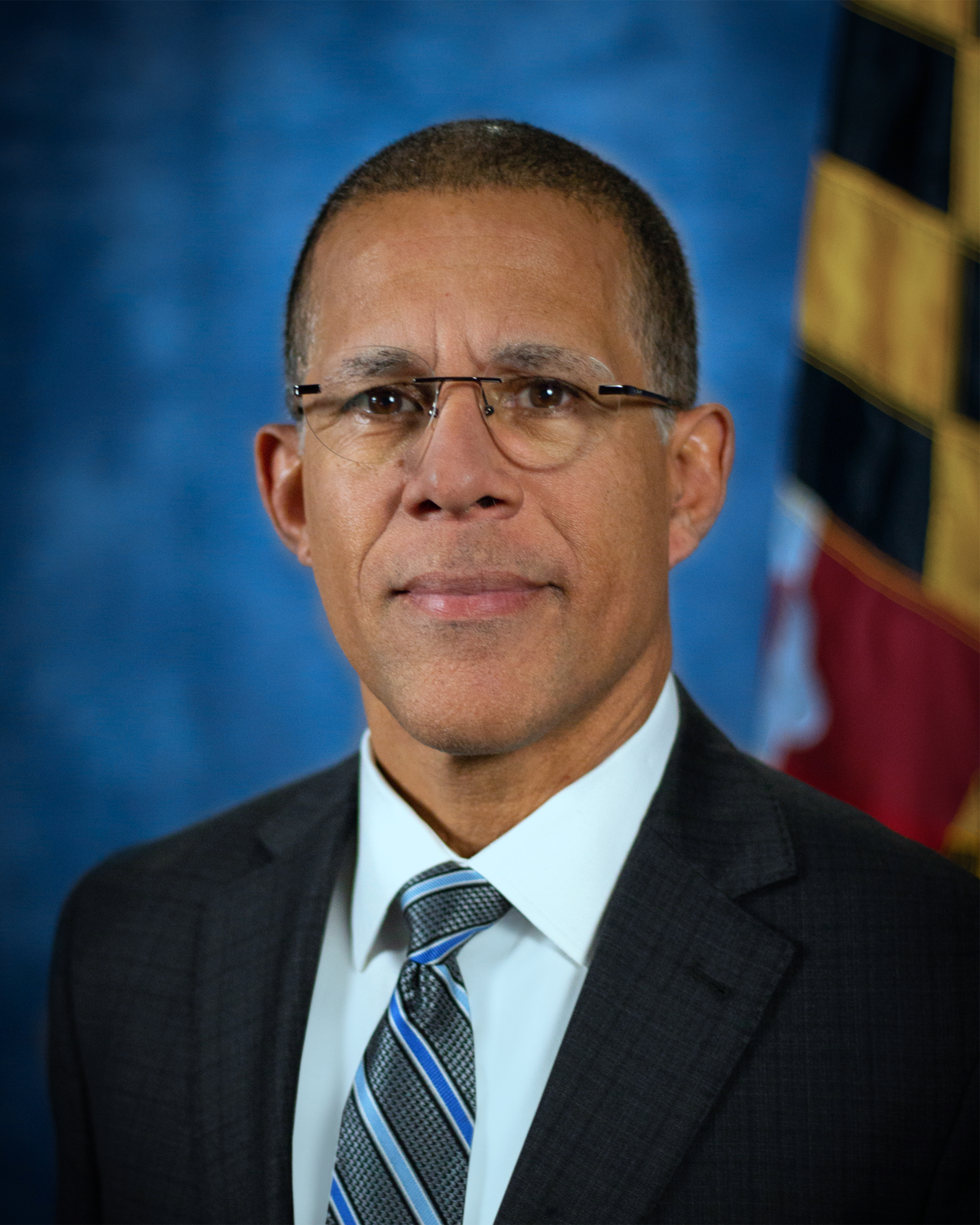
- Official portrait, 2023

47th Attorney General of Maryland
- Incumbent
- Assumed office January 3, 2023
- Governor: Larry Hogan; Wes Moore
- Preceded by: Brian Frosh

Member of the U.S. House of Representatives from Maryland's 4th district
- In office January 3, 2017 – January 3, 2023
- Preceded by: Donna Edwards
- Succeeded by: Glenn Ivey

8th Lieutenant Governor of Maryland
- In office January 17, 2007 – January 21, 2015
- Governor: Martin O'Malley
- Preceded by: Michael Steele
- Succeeded by: Boyd Rutherford

51st Chair of the National Lieutenant Governors Association
- In office 2010–2011
- Preceded by: Bill Bolling
- Succeeded by: Rick Sheehy

Member of the Maryland House of Delegates from the 25th district
- In office January 14, 1999 – January 14, 2007
- Preceded by: Brenda Hughes
- Succeeded by: Aisha Braveboy

Personal details
- Born: Anthony Gregory Brown; November 21, 1961 (age 64) Huntington, New York, U.S.
- Party: Democratic
- Spouses: Patricia Arzuaga (m. 1993; div. 2009); Karmen Walker Bailey (m. 2012)
- Children: 3
- Education: United States Military Academy (attended); Harvard University (BA, JD)
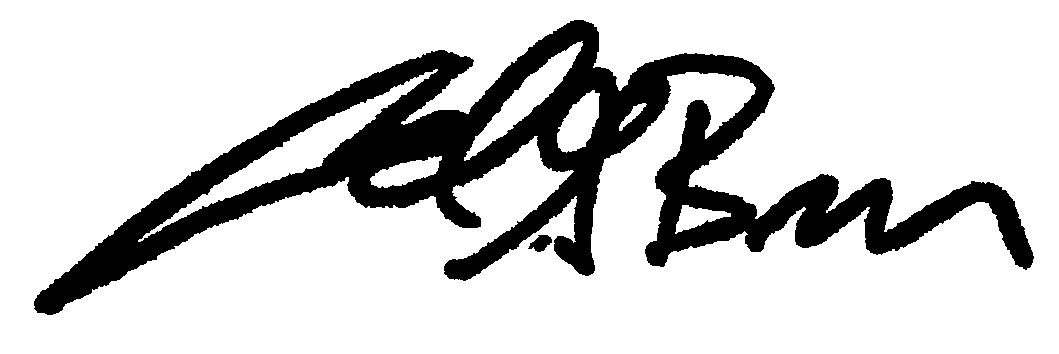
- Signature

Military service
- Branch/service: United States Army
- Years of service: 1984–2014
- Rank: Colonel (retired)
- Unit: 3rd Infantry Division (active); 10th LSO (reserve); 353rd CACOM (OIF); 153rd LSO (reserve)
- Battles/wars: Iraq War
- Awards: Legion of Merit; Bronze Star
- Brown's voice Brown supporting the Workplace Violence Prevention for Health Care and Social Service Workers Act. Recorded November 21, 2019

Anthony Gregory Brown (born November 21, 1961) is an American politician and lawyer serving as the attorney general of Maryland since 2023. He previously served as the U.S. representative for Maryland's 4th congressional district from 2017 to 2023 and as the eighth lieutenant governor of Maryland from 2007 to 2015. A member of the Democratic Party, he was its nominee for governor in the 2014 election, losing to Republican Larry Hogan in a close race.

Brown served two four-year terms in the Maryland House of Delegates, representing Prince George's County from 1999 to 2007. He was elected to the lieutenant governorship in 2006 on the Democratic ticket with Governor Martin O'Malley; both were re-elected in 2010. He is a retired colonel in the United States Army Reserve, having served in the U.S. Army for over thirty years. While lieutenant governor, Brown was the highest-ranking elected official in the nation to have served a tour of duty in Iraq. In 2014, Brown ran unsuccessfully for the governorship, losing to Republican nominee Larry Hogan. In 2016, Brown was elected to the U.S. House. His district covered most of the majority-black precincts in Prince George's County, as well as a sliver of Anne Arundel County.

In October 2021, Brown announced that he would not seek reelection to the U.S. House in 2022 and would instead run for attorney general of Maryland. He won the Democratic primary on July 19, 2022. He defeated Republican lawyer Michael Peroutka in the general election on November 8, 2022, becoming Maryland's first Black attorney general.

== Early life and education ==
Brown was born in 1961 in Huntington, New York, to immigrant parents. His father, Roy Hershel Brown, a physician, was born in Cayo Mambi, Cuba; was raised in Kingston, Jamaica; and later came to the U.S. to attend Fordham University. Roy received his medical degree in Zürich, Switzerland, where he also met his future wife, Lilly I. Berlinger. The couple married and Lilly moved with Brown to New York, where they had Anthony, his sister, and three brothers.

The family lived in Huntington, New York, in Suffolk County on Long Island, where Anthony attended public schools, graduating from Huntington High School in 1979. In his senior year, Brown became the first African American to be elected president of Huntington High School's student council. After high school, Brown started at the United States Military Academy at West Point, where he had an appointment. He quickly switched to Harvard College, where he majored in government and resided in Quincy House. At Harvard, Brown served on the Student Advisory Committee at Harvard Kennedy School's Institute of Politics. Since Harvard did not offer ROTC at the time, in his second year, Brown enrolled in the Army Reserve Officer Training Corps program at MIT and earned a two-year scholarship. In 1984, Brown graduated with an A.B. cum laude, and as a Distinguished Military Graduate.

=== Military career ===
Upon graduation, Brown received a commission as a second lieutenant in the U.S. Army. He served on active duty for five years. He graduated first in his flight class at Fort Rucker, Alabama, and received his aeronautical rating as an Army aviator. He also completed airborne training, receiving both the Basic Parachutist Badge and the Air Assault Badge. During his time on active duty, Brown served as a helicopter pilot with the Aviation Brigade, 3rd Infantry Division in Europe. During that period of active duty, Brown held positions as platoon leader for a target acquisition, reconnaissance and surveillance platoon, executive officer of a general support aviation company, a battalion logistics officer, and the flight operations officer for Task Force 23.

== Law school and legal career ==
After completing his active duty service, Brown returned to graduate school, entering Harvard Law School in 1989 and earning his JD degree. He attended Harvard Law School at the same time as future President Barack Obama, Artur Davis and actor Hill Harper. Brown was a member of the Board of Student Advisers. His third-year paper, written under the supervision of Professor Charles Ogletree, analyzed the scope of the Fourth Amendment's protections against unreasonable search and seizure in the military. Brown was chair of the Membership Committee of the Black Law Students Association. Brown graduated from Harvard Law, with a Juris Doctor in 1992.

After graduating from law school, Brown completed a two-year clerkship for Chief Judge Eugene Sullivan of the United States Court of Appeals for the Armed Forces. In 1994, he joined the Washington, D.C. office of the international law firm of Wilmer Cutler Pickering (now WilmerHale). Brown practiced law with the late John Payton, a renowned civil rights attorney and former president of the NAACP Legal Defense Fund, and Stephen H. Sachs, who was the United States Attorney for the District of Maryland from 1967 to 1970 and was the 40th Attorney General of Maryland. In 1998, Brown received Wilmer's Pro Bono Publico Award for his work in representing indigent clients. In 1999, Brown worked for Merrill Lynch for five months. Brown joined the Prince George's County land use and zoning law firm Gibbs & Haller in 2000, after having been elected to the Maryland General Assembly.

== JAG Corps ==
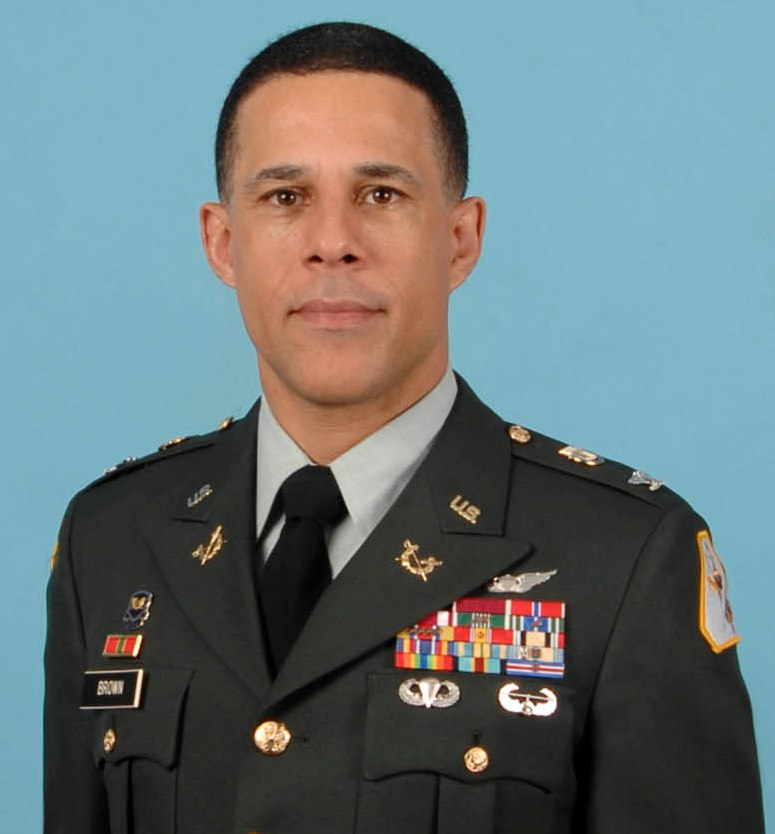
Colonel Brown's official U.S. Army photo, 2011

Brown continued his military service transferring from the Army's Aviation Branch to the Judge Advocate General's Corps as a Judge Advocate General (JAG) in the United States Army Reserve. Brown began his service as a JAG with attending the JAG School at the University of Virginia and then the 10th LSO in Upper Marlboro, Maryland, where he held numerous assignments, including in the areas of international law and claims law. Brown ultimately attained the rank of colonel in the U.S. Army Reserve before reaching the point of mandatory retirement for a colonel with 30 years of commissioned service in July 2014.

His assignments included commander of the 153rd Legal Support Organization in Norristown, Pennsylvania, where, in addition to supporting deploying service members and their families with legal services, he mobilized eighteen soldiers to Fort Hood, Texas, in support of the III Corps' Operation New Dawn mission to Iraq. Prior to his tenure with the 153rd LSO, Brown was the staff judge advocate for the 353rd Civil Affairs Command headquartered at Fort Wadsworth, New York.

In 2004, Brown, then a member of the Maryland House of Delegates, was deployed to Iraq as part of Operation Iraqi Freedom. Brown served in Baghdad, Fallujah, Kirkuk, and Basra with the 353rd Civil Affairs Command as senior consultant to the Iraqi Ministry of Displacement and Migration. Brown received the Bronze Star for his distinguished service in Iraq.

== Maryland House of Delegates ==
Brown's political career began in 1998, when he was elected to serve in the Maryland House of Delegates, representing the 25th district in Prince George's County. Brown ran on a Democratic Party ticket with Senator Ulysses Currie, Delegate Dereck Davis, and Delegate Melony Griffith. He served two terms in the Maryland House of Delegates and rose to several positions of leadership. During his first term, Brown served on the House Economic Matters Committee. He was appointed vice chair of the Judiciary Committee in 2003. In 2004, Speaker of the House Michael E. Busch appointed Brown to the position of majority whip, the fourth-ranking position in the House.

== Lieutenant governor of Maryland ==
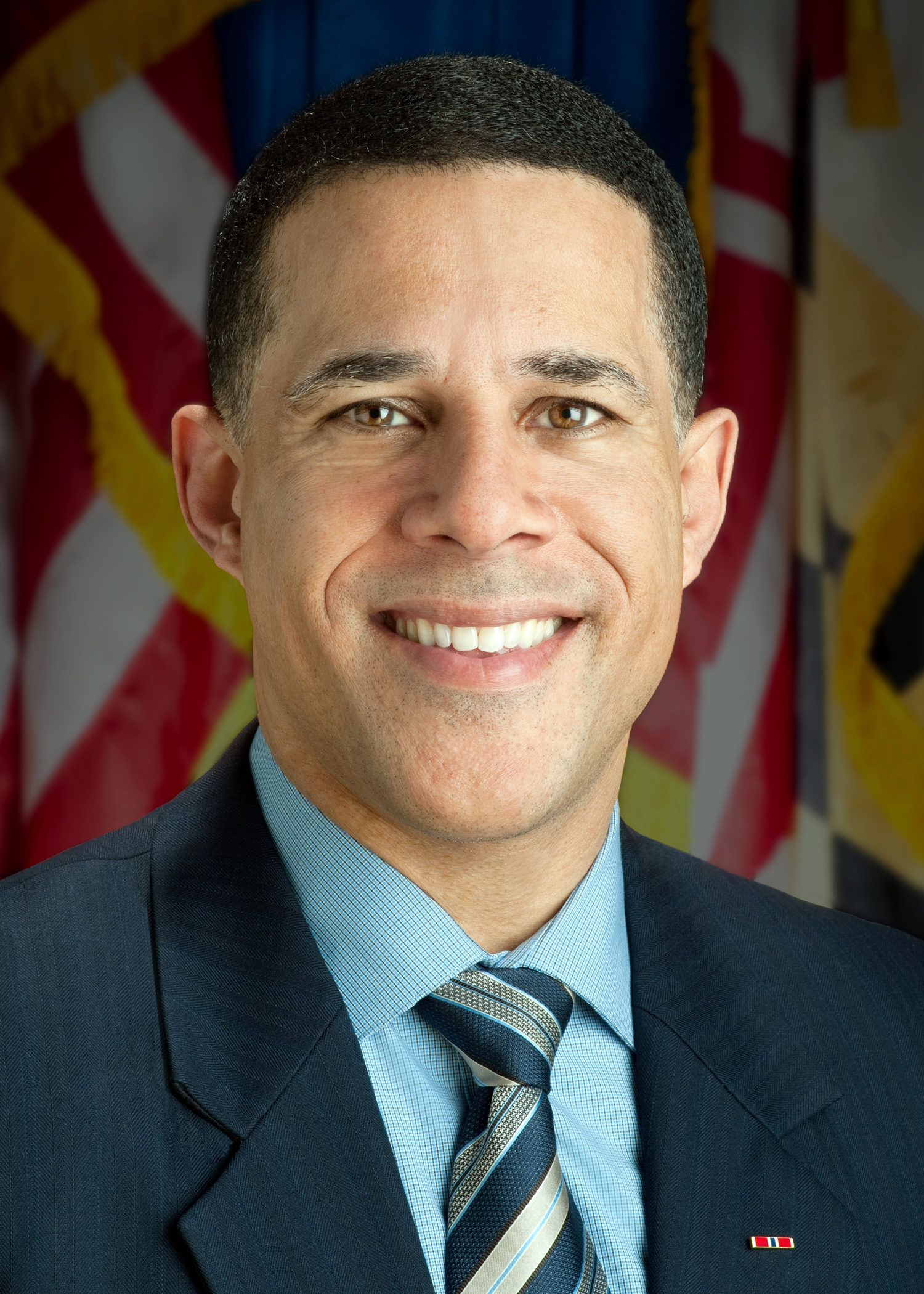
Brown during his tenure as lieutenant governor

In 2006, Brown was elected lieutenant governor on a ticket with Martin O'Malley, the former mayor of Baltimore. The pair were the only challenging candidates to defeat an incumbent gubernatorial ticket in the 2006 election cycle. On January 17, 2007, Brown was sworn in as Maryland's 8th lieutenant governor. Both Brown and O'Malley were reelected by a 56% to 42% margin on November 2, 2010. Brown was the first person elected lieutenant governor directly from the Maryland House of Delegates.

Governor O'Malley tasked Brown to lead the O'Malley-Brown administration's efforts on several policy fronts, including efforts to expand and improve health care, support economic development, help victims of domestic violence, increase access to higher education, and provide veterans with better services and resources.

In July 2010, Brown was elected chair of the National Lieutenant Governors Association, a position he served in for a term of one year.

=== Health care ===
As co-chair of the Maryland Health Care Reform Coordinating Council and Maryland's Health Quality and Cost Council, Lt. Governor Brown led the O'Malley-Brown administration's efforts to reduce costs, expand access, and improve the quality of care for all residents of the state. In June 2012, Brown was named "Maryland's Public Health Hero" by the Maryland Health Care for All! Coalition. He assisted in the implementation of the Affordable Care Act, which according to a "non-partisan" 2012 study using Obama administration numbers and various state agency projections, would save Maryland $672 million by 2020. In both 2011 and 2012, Brown led legislation through the Maryland General Assembly to create a health insurance exchange.

Brown was severely criticized for his leadership of the development of the health insurance exchange. As of April 14, 2014, it had enrolled only 66,203 individuals (including family members on shared plans). The O'Malley administration apologized for the "botched" launch of the web site and had to seek emergency funding legislation to make stopgap changes to the site. The state paid a contractor $125.5 million to develop and operate the failed site. Due to the failed rollout, the state incurred an estimated $30.5 million in unnecessary Medicaid spending. The web site failure was the subject of a federal investigation into the costs associated with developing the exchange and the site's performance failures. The state announced that it was considering scrapping its failed online health exchange altogether and hiring a new contractor to build a new online exchange using technology employed by the state of Connecticut, at an expected cost of tens of millions of dollars. The Obama administration relaxed rules for residents of states like Maryland with dysfunctional online health care exchanges, allowing consumers to bypass the exchanges altogether to buy health insurance.

Brown led efforts to address health disparities among racial and ethnic groups in Maryland. In 2012, he developed created Health Enterprise Zones, which would use incentives to increase the number of primary care providers and other essential health care services in underserved communities. The goal is to reduce preventable diseases, such as asthma and diabetes.

=== Economic development ===
Brown led the administration's economic development portfolio. He served as chair of numerous economic development initiatives, including the Joint Legislative and Executive Commission on Oversight of Public-Private Partnerships, the Governor's Subcabinet on Base Realignment and Closure (BRAC), and the FastTrack initiative – part of Maryland Made Easy (www.easy.maryland.gov) – to streamline the state permitting process for businesses and developers.

=== Public-private partnerships ===
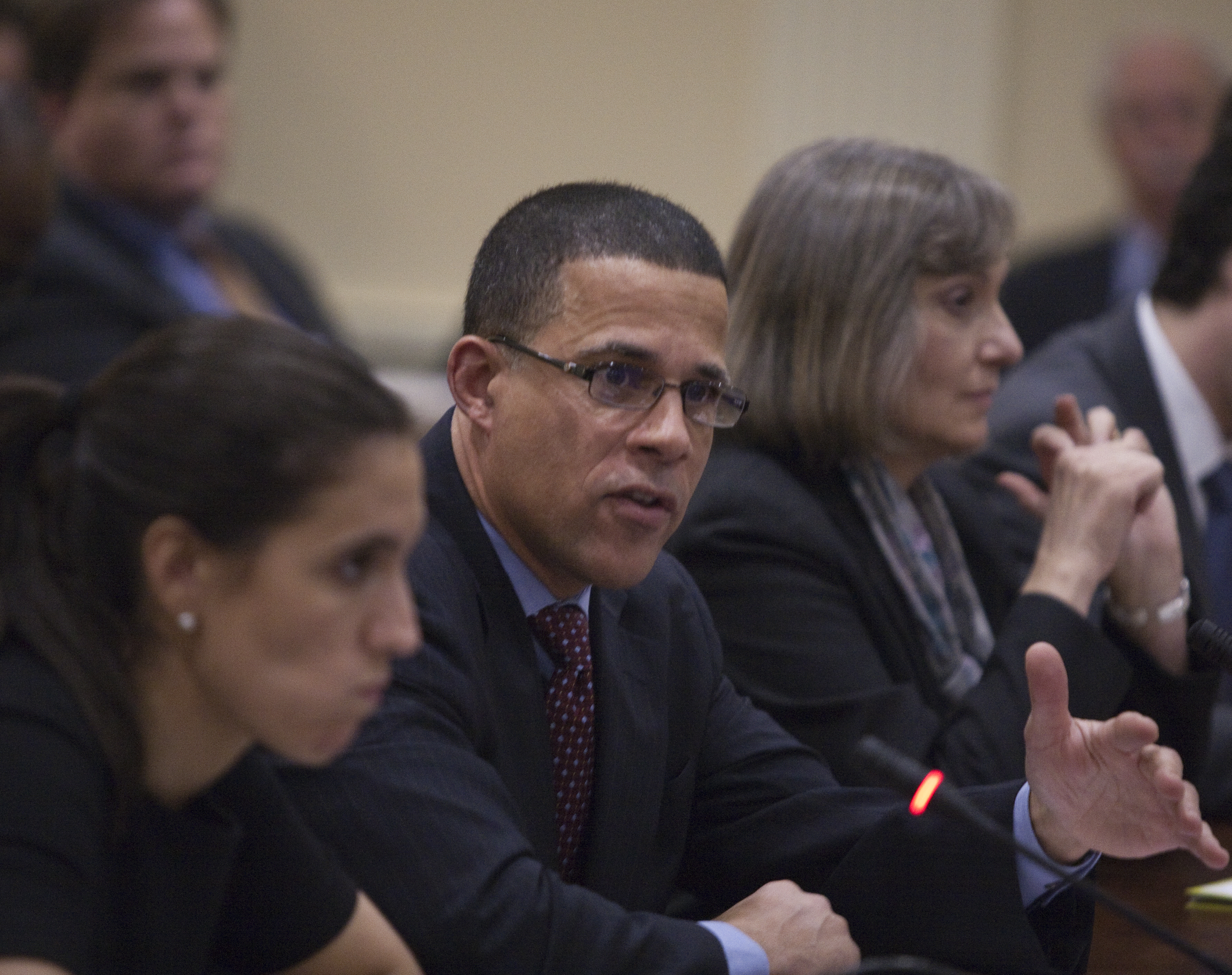
Lt. Governor Anthony Brown testifies for Public-Private Partnership Legislation

Brown became one of the leading champions for the increased use of public-private partnerships to advance infrastructure projects in Maryland. Governor Martin O'Malley appointed Brown to serve as Chair of the Joint Legislative and Executive Commission on Oversight of Public-Private Partnerships. The fifteen-member Commission was established in 2010 under House Bill 1370 to evaluate the State's framework and oversight of public–private partnerships. Under Brown's leadership, the Commission worked to increase the potential for private investment in public infrastructure projects. The commission submitted its final report to the Governor and General Assembly in January 2012, which included assessing the oversight, best practices, and approval processes for public-private partnerships in other states; evaluating the definition of public-private partnerships; making recommendations concerning the appropriate manner of conducting legislative monitoring and oversight of public-private partnerships; and making recommendations concerning broad policy parameters within which public-private partnerships should be negotiated.

=== Base realignment and closure (BRAC) ===
Brown was tasked by Governor O'Malley to lead the Base Realignment and Closure Subcabinet and the implementation of Maryland's BRAC Plan, which ensured the State of Maryland would be ready for the 28,000 households that came to the state as a result of the BRAC process. It was estimated that between and 45,000 to 60,000 jobs would be created in Maryland by 2016 due to BRAC. Since 2007, the BRAC Subcabinet met regularly with BRAC stakeholders to coordinate and synchronize the State's efforts with public and private partners to address BRAC needs. The BRAC Plan set forth new initiatives and priorities to address the human capital and physical infrastructure requirements to support BRAC, as well as to seize the opportunities that BRAC presents, while preserving the quality of life already enjoyed by Marylanders. Several of the larger moves included the Army's Communications–Electronics Command (CECOM) to Aberdeen Proving Ground from Ft. Monmouth, New Jersey, and the Air National Guard Readiness Center at Joint Base Andrews Naval Air Facility Washington. The Defense Information Systems Agency was relocating to Fort George G. Meade from northern Virginia and Walter Reed Army Medical Center was moving to the Bethesda Naval Hospital to create the Walter Reed National Military Medical Center at Bethesda.

In 2011, the Association of Defense Communities recognized Brown as their Public Official of the Year for his leadership on BRAC.

=== Domestic violence ===
In August 2008, his cousin Kathy was murdered by her estranged boyfriend. Building on his legislative experience and personal perspective, Brown has championed reforms to fight domestic violence and provide improved support to victims.

In 2009, Brown led efforts to improve domestic violence laws and take guns out of the hands of domestic abusers by allowing judges to order the abuser in a temporary protective order to surrender any firearms in their possession.

During the 2010 Legislative Session, Brown worked with the General Assembly to pass legislation allowing a victim of domestic abuse to terminate a residential lease with a copy of a final protective order. During the 2012 Legislative Session, Brown gained the administration's goal of extending unemployment benefits to a victim of domestic violence who decides to leave employment because the abuser is a threat at the workplace.

Brown also led efforts to expand the availability of hospital-based Domestic Violence Screening programs at Maryland hospitals to help identify victims of domestic violence and connect them to support services. In 2010, he helped launch Maryland's fifth hospital-based domestic violence program at Prince George's Hospital Center in Cheverly. In 2011, Brown helped launch a sixth hospital-based program at Meritus Medical Center in Hagerstown, Maryland. Similar programs are in place in the Baltimore region at Anne Arundel Medical Center, Mercy Medical Center, Sinai Hospital, and Northwest Hospital.

=== Education ===
Under the O'Malley Brown Administration, Maryland's students made dramatic improvements in nearly every statistical category, and Maryland's schools were ranked # 1 in the country for 4 years in a row.

Brown lead the O'Malley-Brown administration's efforts to increase taxes to support education and other programs. They raised taxes over 40 times during their tenure. The administration took steps to make a higher education more accessible and affordable for all Marylanders, including making record investments in community colleges and working to keep an education affordable at four-year public colleges and universities. As a result, the number of STEM college graduates, number of associate degrees, and the number of bachelor's degrees awarded in Maryland all increased since the team took office in 2007.

In 2010, Lt. Governor Brown launched the Skills2Compete initiative, which promotes programs and activities that lead to increasing the skill level of Marylanders though the attainment of a post-secondary credential, apprenticeship program or degree.

=== Veterans affairs ===
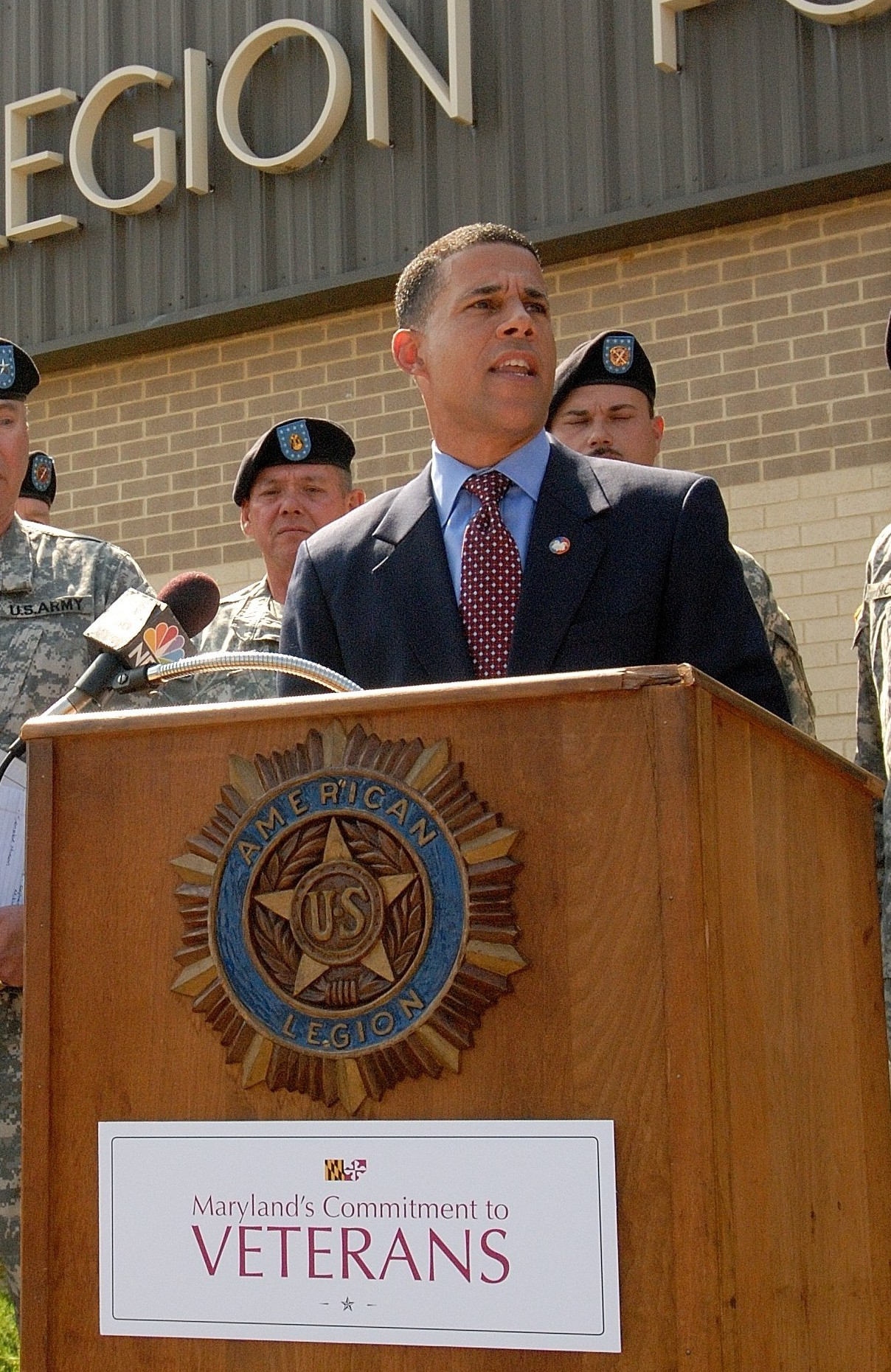
Lt. Governor Brown announcing the launch of 'Maryland's Commitment to Veterans' tour, September 2008

Brown was the nation's highest-ranking elected official to have served a tour of military duty in Iraq and he led the O'Malley-Brown Administration's work to improve benefits and services for Maryland's veterans.

In 2012, Brown announced the launch of Maryland Homefront: the Veterans and Military Family Mortgage Program, which helps qualified current and former military members find homes by giving them a discounted mortgage interest rate and help with closing costs. Also in 2012, Brown helped pass legislation that allows notation of 'veteran' status on drivers' licenses and identification card.

During the 2008 session of the Maryland General Assembly, Brown led the administration's successful efforts to pass a sweeping veterans package, including passage of the Veterans Behavioral Health Act of 2008. The legislation sets aside $2.3 million for the expansion of direct services to OIF/OEF veterans living with behavioral and mental health problem. The legislation also named Brown chair of the Maryland Veterans Behavioral Health Advisory Board.

Other legislation passed as part of the "Maryland's Commitment to Veterans" package includes:

- Expansion of state scholarship fund for OIF/OEF veterans and their dependents;
- Protection of state-funded business loan program for veterans and service-disable veterans;
- Creation of reintegration program for members of the Maryland National Guard returning from service in Iraq and Afghanistan; and
- Expansion of state veteran service centers in rural communities.

=== 2008 election and Obama transition ===
Despite being a classmate of Barack Obama, in September 2007, Brown initially endorsed Hillary Clinton for President in the 2008 election. He campaigned for her in several states, including South Carolina and Georgia. In June 2008, Brown subsequently endorsed Obama.

In July 2008, Brown was appointed to the Democratic National Committee's Platform Committee and served on the Platform Drafting Committee. Brown led the efforts to strengthen the Democratic Party's commitment to veterans and ensuring that the Chesapeake Bay be named as a "national treasure". Brown was a "Party Leader/Elected Official" delegate to the 2008 Democratic National Convention in Denver, Colorado, in late August 2008 and cast his vote for then-Senator Obama, along with 98 members of the Maryland delegation.

Brown was named co-chair of the Obama/Biden Presidential Transition Agency Review Team for the Department of Veterans Affairs on November 14, 2008.

=== 2014 gubernatorial candidacy ===
Anthony Brown announced his candidacy for governor of Maryland in the 2014 election on May 10, 2013, at Prince George's County Community College. He chose Ken Ulman, county executive of Howard County, Maryland, as his running mate in June 2013. Brown was endorsed by Governor Martin O'Malley, U.S. Senator Barbara Mikulski, U.S. Congressman Steny Hoyer, Maryland Senate President Thomas V. Miller Jr., and Baltimore Mayor Stephanie Rawlings-Blake. Brown faced Attorney General Doug Gansler and Delegate Heather Mizeur in the Democratic primary. Brown won the June 2014 Democratic primary and became the Democratic nominee for governor but was defeated by Republican nominee Larry Hogan in the general election on November 4, 2014.

2014 Maryland gubernatorial election
Party	Candidate	Votes	%	±%
Republican	Larry Hogan	847,280	51.45%	+9.66%
Democratic	Anthony Brown	771,242	46.83%	−9.41%
Libertarian	Shawn Quinn	23,813	1.44%	+0.68%
Write-ins		4,265	0.25%	
Turnout		1,655,375	45%	

== U.S. House of Representatives ==
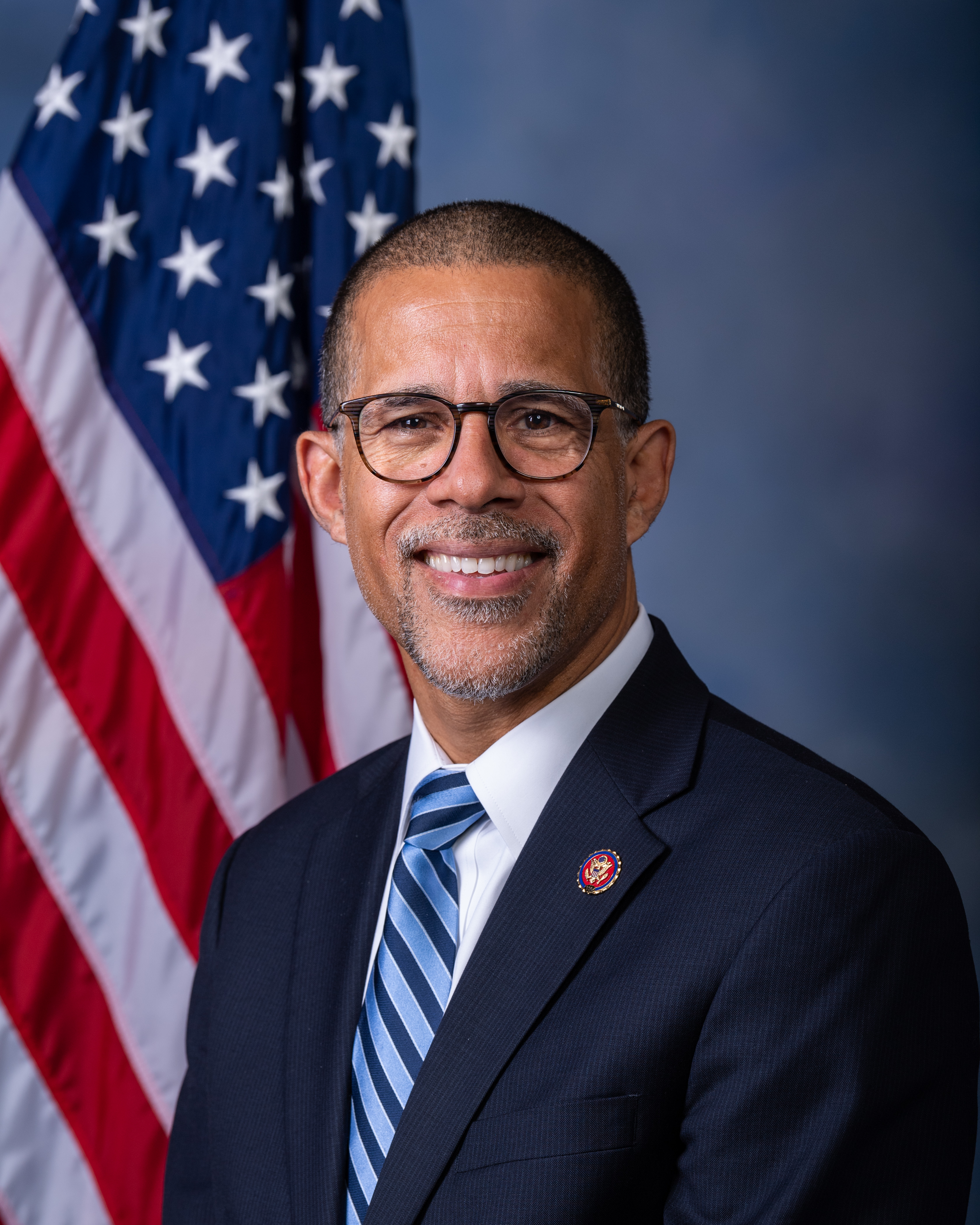
Brown's official congressional portrait

=== Elections ===
2016

On March 12, 2015, The Baltimore Sun reported that Brown would run for the U.S. House of Representatives seat for Maryland's 4th district, which was being vacated by Donna Edwards, who was running for the US Senate. He won a crowded six-way Democratic primary—the real contest in this heavily Democratic, black-majority district—with 41 percent of the vote.

Brown won the seat in the general election, taking over 73 percent of the vote.

=== Committee assignments ===
- Committee on Armed Services (Vice Chair, 2017–2021)
  - Subcommittee on Intelligence, Emerging Threats, and Capabilities
  - Subcommittee on Tactical Air and Land Forces
- Committee on Ethics
- Committee on Natural Resources
  - Subcommittee on Energy and Mineral Resources
  - Subcommittee on Water, Oceans, and Wildlife
- Committee on Transportation & Infrastructure
  - Subcommittee on Aviation
  - Subcommittee on Coast Guard and Maritime Transportation
  - Subcommittee on Economic Development, Public Buildings, and Emergency Management
  - Subcommittee on Highways and Transit

=== Caucus memberships ===
- Congressional Black Caucus
- New Democrat Coalition
- Medicare for All Caucus
- Congressional NextGen 9-1-1 Caucus
- U.S.-Japan Caucus
- Blue Collar Caucus

== Attorney General of Maryland ==
=== Elections ===
==== 2022 ====
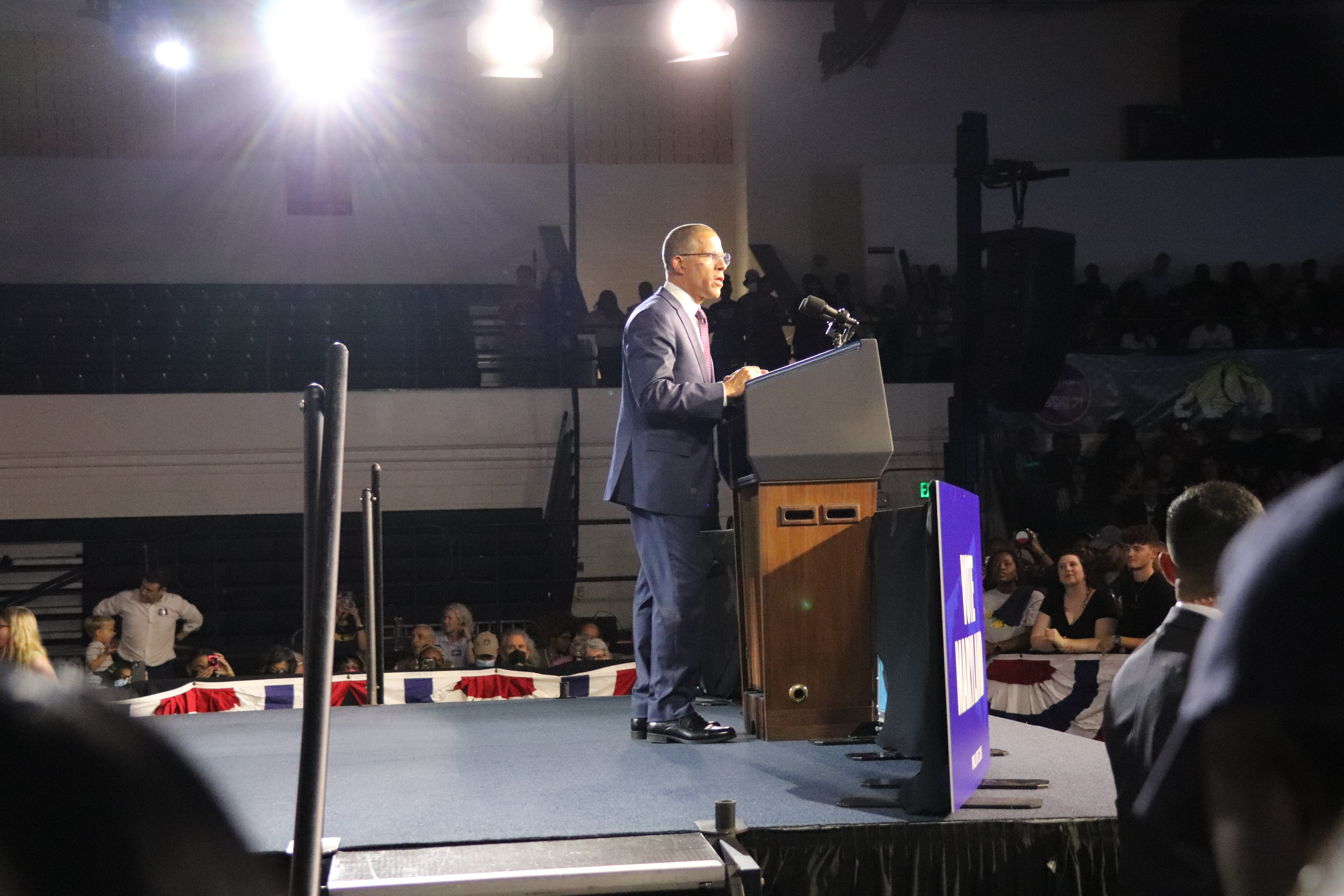
Brown campaigning at Bowie State University, 2022

Brown said that he would not seek re-election to the House of Representatives on October 25, 2021, instead announcing that he would run for Attorney General of Maryland.

During the primary, Brown received endorsements from U.S. Senators Cory Booker and Elizabeth Warren, and U.S. Representatives Steny Hoyer, Kweisi Mfume, and David Trone. He also received endorsements from the Maryland Sierra Club and the Maryland State Education Association.

In May 2022, an investigation from Time alleged that Brown violated state election laws by using funds from his congressional campaign account to bankroll his bid for attorney general.

Brown won the Democratic primary election on July 19, 2022, defeating former First Lady of Maryland Katie O'Malley with 55.1 percent of the vote. He defeated Republican lawyer Michael Peroutka in the general election on November 8, 2022.

==== 2026 ====
Brown is running for a second term as attorney general.

=== Tenure ===
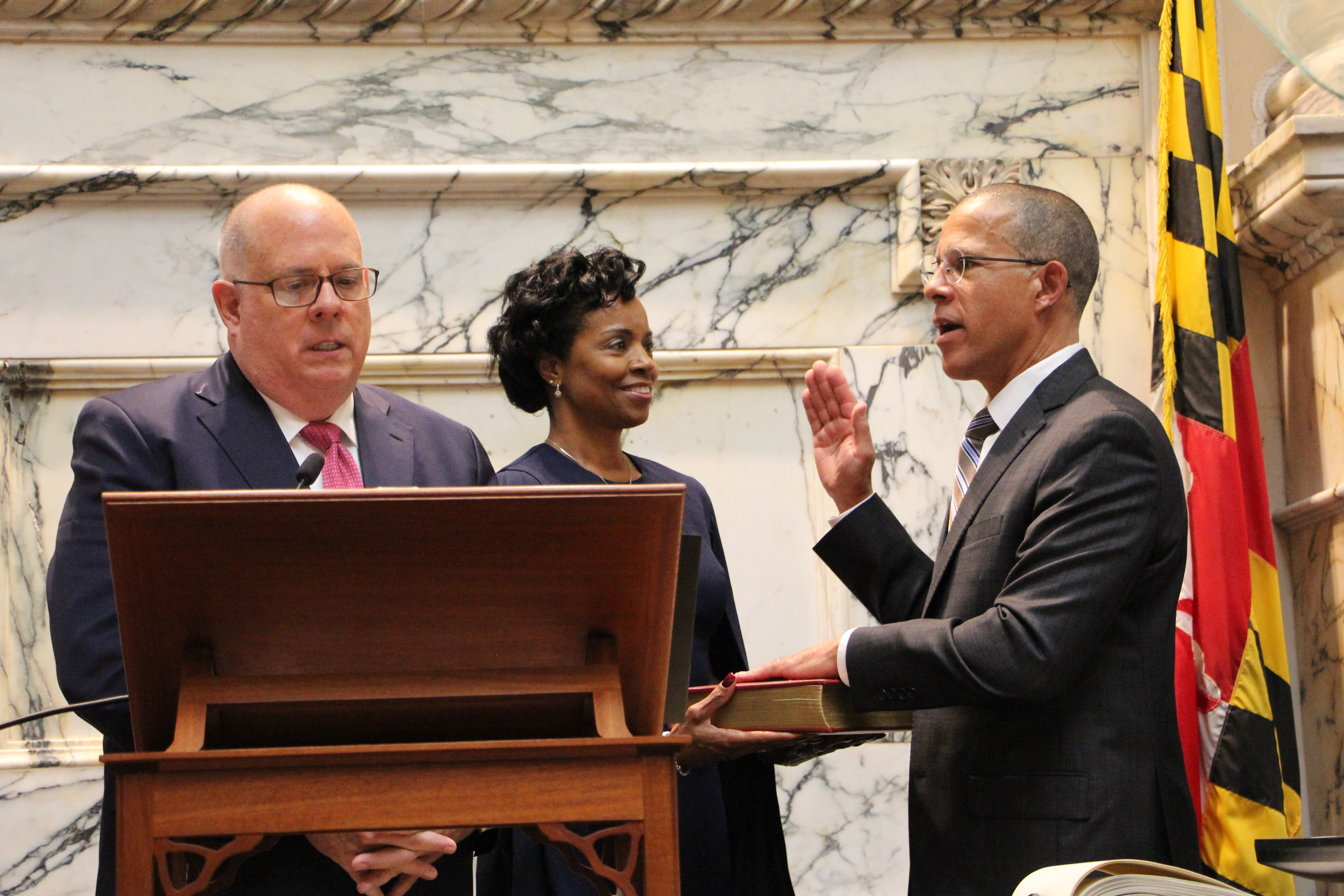
Brown being sworn in by Governor Larry Hogan, January 2023

Brown was sworn in on January 3, 2023, becoming Maryland's first Black attorney general.

Before Brown took office in 2023, the Maryland Attorney General's office launched an investigation into allegations of sexual abuse perpetrated by members of the Roman Catholic Archdiocese of Baltimore. Brown inherited the investigation, and, in April 2023, released a 463-page report accusing the Archdiocese of covering up more than 600 cases of child sexual abuse against 156 Catholic priests over 80 years. Following its release, he said that the Attorney General's office had ongoing investigations into sexual abuse allegations in the Roman Catholic Archdiocese of Washington and the Roman Catholic Diocese of Wilmington.

In January 2023, ahead of his swearing in, Brown said he supported legislation that would allow him to sue companies and individuals for civil rights violations. He also set out multiple goals for his time in office, including increasing salaries and employment in the Attorney General's office, enforcing environmental regulations, and investigating police misconduct. The Maryland General Assembly passed bills during its 2023 legislative session that gave the Attorney General's office the authority to prosecute police-involved deaths and civil rights violations in housing and employment, which were signed into law in May 2023. As of January 2025, the Maryland Attorney General's Office has brought charges in two of the 39 police-involved fatalities it has investigated since October 2023.

Brown was an at-large delegate to the 2024 Democratic National Convention, pledged to Kamala Harris. During the second presidency of Donald Trump, he filed numerous lawsuits against the Trump administration.

In July 2026, the U.S. Department of Justice filed a lawsuit against the state of Maryland, claiming that the Community Trust Act, which prohibits state law enforcement from holding individuals for U.S. Immigration and Customs Enforcement (ICE) without a judicial warrant and limits how much local authorities could communicate with ICE, violated the Supremacy Clause. Brown promised to defended the law in court, saying that it did not prevent law enforcement agencies from cooperating with federal authorities on criminal investigations nor prevent federal immigration officers from operating in the state.

== Personal life ==
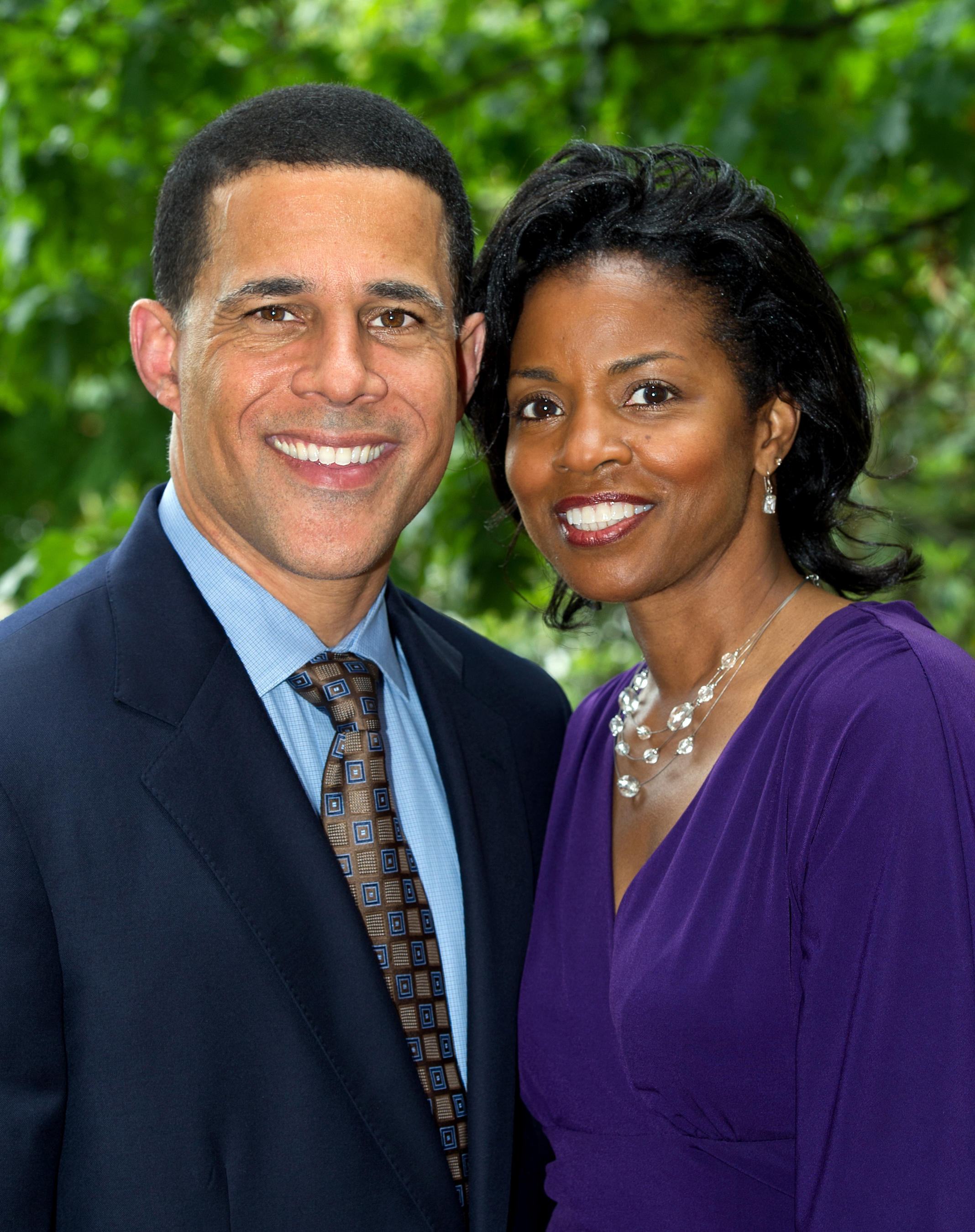
Lieutenant Governor Brown and Karmen Walker Brown in May 2011

Brown married Patricia Arzuaga in 1993, and they had two children, Rebecca and Jonathan, before their divorce in 2009. Jonathan was adopted.

Brown married Karmen Walker on May 27, 2012. She is the widow of Prince George's County police officer Anthony Michael Walker. He became the stepfather of Walker's son Anthony. Both Anthony and Brown's son Jonathan were in the same grade at the same Catholic school in 2012. Walker is a director of government relations with Comcast. Brown is Catholic.

=== Awards, ribbons, and badges ===
Brown's personal awards include:

1st row	Legion of Merit	Bronze Star Medal	
2nd row	Meritorious Service Medal	Army Commendation Medal with two oak leaf clusters	Army Achievement Medal with one oak leaf cluster
3rd row	Army Reserve Components Achievement Medal with four oak leaf clusters	National Defense Service Medal with bronze service star	Iraq Campaign Medal
4th row	Global War on Terrorism Service Medal	Outstanding Volunteer Service Medal	Armed Forces Reserve Medal with Hourglass (not shown) and "M" devices
5th row	Army Service Ribbon	Army Overseas Service Ribbon	Army Reserve Overseas Training Ribbon with award numeral 2

Brown was also awarded the Army Aviator Badge, and the Army Superior Unit Award. He is Airborne and Air Assault qualified, and is authorized to wear one Overseas Service Bar.

== See also ==
- List of African-American United States representatives
- List of minority governors and lieutenant governors in the United States

Political offices
Preceded by Michael Steele	Lieutenant Governor of Maryland; 2007–2015	Succeeded by Boyd Rutherford
Party political offices
Preceded by Martin O'Malley	Democratic nominee for Governor of Maryland; 2014	Succeeded by Ben Jealous
Preceded by Brian Frosh	Democratic nominee for Attorney General of Maryland; 2022, 2026	Most recent
U.S. House of Representatives
Preceded by Donna Edwards	Member of the U.S. House of Representatives from Maryland's 4th congressional district 2017–2023	Succeeded by Glenn Ivey
Legal offices
Preceded by Brian Frosh	Attorney General of Maryland; 2023–present	Incumbent
U.S. order of precedence (ceremonial)
Preceded by John Delaney as Former U.S. Representative	Order of precedence of the United States as Former U.S. Representative	Succeeded by David Trone as Former U.S. Representative
