= Women's Campaign Fund =

American political action committee supporting women candidates

- Formation: 1974; 52 years ago
- Type: Political action committee with an affiliated nonprofit
- Purpose: Electing women to public office
- Headquarters: Washington, D.C.
- Board chair: Georgia Berner
- Website: wcfonline.org

The Women's Campaign Fund (WCF), for a time known as the Women's Campaign Forum, is an American nonpartisan political action committee (PAC) based in Washington, D.C., that works to elect women to public office. Founded in 1974, it was the first national organization created to raise money specifically for women candidates. It has backed candidates from both major parties, generally limiting its support to those who favor abortion rights. The nonprofit She Should Run began as an affiliate of WCF.

== History ==
=== Founding (1974) ===
WCF began operating in January 1974, a year after the Supreme Court's decision in Roe v. Wade, with start-up money lent by Stewart Mott, an heir to the General Motors fortune. Its early leadership included chair Ann Zill and executive director Maureen Aspin. The fund supported candidates it considered progressive and electable, with backing for the Equal Rights Amendment and abortion rights as key criteria; because those positions then had supporters in both parties, it endorsed Democrats and Republicans alike.

In the 1974 elections, WCF gave between about $21,000 and $22,500 to 28 women running for federal and state office, in amounts ranging from $100 to $2,500. Recipients included Bella Abzug, Shirley Chisholm, Barbara Jordan, Elizabeth Holtzman, Pat Schroeder, Yvonne Burke, and Cardiss Collins in races for the U.S. House; Betty Roberts in her campaign for the U.S. Senate from Oregon; and March Fong, who was elected California Secretary of State. The fund reported about 6,000 regular donors at the time.

=== Later development ===
WCF was one of several women's organizations, along with the National Women's Political Caucus and the National Organization for Women, whose PACs were the first to focus on electing women. By the late 1980s and 1990s, other women's PACs had appeared, most prominently EMILY's List, which backs pro-choice Democratic women, and the WISH List, which backs pro-choice Republican women. According to the organization, it had supported more than 2,000 women candidates by the 2010s, at the federal, state, and local levels.

In the late 2000s and early 2010s, the organization operated under the name Women's Campaign Forum, and some of its PAC's federal contributions were reported under that name.

=== Bennett era and She Should Run (2009–2014) ===
In April 2009, former congressional candidate Siobhan "Sam" Bennett became WCF's president and CEO. During Bennett's tenure, WCF operated She Should Run, an affiliated 501(c)(3) initiative to encourage women to consider running for office and to produce research on women in politics, while the PAC continued making contributions to endorsed candidates. In 2012, WCF said its goal was for women to hold 30 percent of congressional seats by 2020. The organization also joined the Women's Media Center and Political Parity in "Name It. Change It.", a campaign against sexist media coverage of women candidates.

Bennett announced in November 2013 that she would leave both WCF and She Should Run in January 2014. At the time, Georgia Berner chaired the boards of both organizations. She Should Run later became an independent organization led by Erin Loos Cutraro, a former WCF political director.

=== Recent activity ===
WCF published a list of 13 endorsed candidates for the 2018 election cycle. Its affiliated nonprofit reported very little revenue in 2021 and 2022, and as of 2026 GuideStar listed the nonprofit as no longer appearing on the IRS master file of tax-exempt organizations.

== See also ==
- EMILY's List
- Emerge America
- National Women's Political Caucus
- She Should Run
- WISH List
