= Mt. Ennon Baptist Church =

Coordinates: 38°45′14″N 76°55′20.6″W

- Mt. Ennon Baptist Church
- Location: Clinton, Maryland
- Country: USA
- Denomination: Baptist
- Website: www.mtennon.org

History
- Founded: 1981
- Founder: Robert A. Samuels

Mt. Ennon Baptist Church is a progressive Baptist megachurch located in Clinton, Maryland. It is affiliated with the National Baptist Convention, USA. The senior pastor is Delman Coates.

== History ==
The church was founded in 1981 by Reverend Robert A. Samuels.

Since 2004, Reverend Delman Coates became senior pastor. Under the leadership of Delman Coates, there is a church-wide initiative in the areas of spiritual, service, and substance growth. He is committed to a ministry of spiritual renewal, social justice, and community revitalization.

In 2008, the church protested against the Black Entertainment Television network for misogynistic violence and stereotypes about African Americans in its youth-oriented video programs.

In 2009, Outreach magazine ranked Mt. Ennon as one of the 100 Fastest Growing Congregations in the United States.

In 2012, the church organized three days of marches in Washington, D.C., advocating for improved access to healthcare.

In 2013, the church had 8,000 members.

== Beliefs ==
=== Marriage ===
In 2012, Coates announced his support for same-sex marriage. Following this announcement, less than 10 people left the church for this reason while 1,000 people joined the church during that year, a record number of new members for the church.
