= Eric C. Bauman =

American political operative (1958–2025)

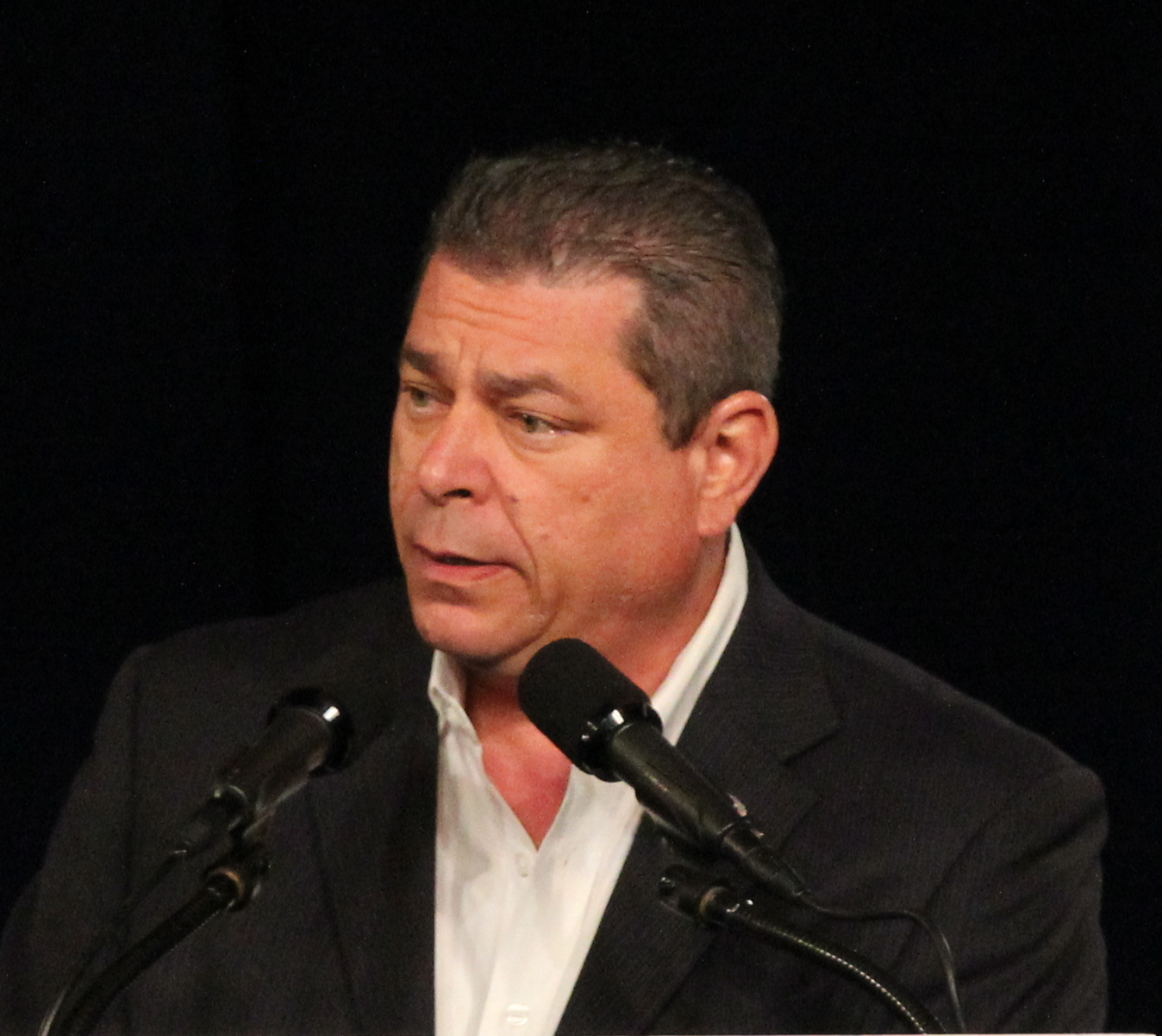
- Bauman in 2014

Chair of the California Democratic Party
- In office May 20, 2017 – November 29, 2018
- Preceded by: John Burton
- Succeeded by: Alex Gallardo-Rooker

Personal details
- Born: Eric Carl Bauman; December 10, 1958 New York City, U.S.
- Died: June 16, 2025 (aged 66) Los Angeles, California, U.S.
- Party: Democratic
- Spouse: Michael Andraychak
- Relatives: Jon Bauman (uncle)
- Education: Excelsior College (BSN); American Century University
- Website: Official website

Eric Carl Bauman (December 10, 1958 – June 16, 2025) was an American political operative who served as chair of the California Democratic Party from 2017 to 2018. Previously chair of the Los Angeles County Democratic Party (2000–2017), and vice chair of the state party (2009–2017), he is known for his influence in Los Angeles County and California Democratic politics. He announced his resignation as head of the California Democratic Party on November 29, 2018, following sexual misconduct allegations.

== Early life and education ==
Born in the Bronx, New York, Bauman worked as a registered nurse for many years before entering politics. He obtained his bachelor's degree in nursing from an online college, Excelsior College. He also obtained graduate education in health care administration from Century University, now known as American Century University, an unaccredited, for-profit university based in Albuquerque, New Mexico.

== Political influence ==
Bauman was chair of the California Democratic Party, the largest state Democratic Party entity in the United States.

Bauman was referred to as a "kingmaker" in Los Angeles County Democratic politics by LA Weekly. In the article he claimed, "I don't make promises or ask people to do things in a quid pro quo format. That would be against the law."

Under his leadership, the Los Angeles Democratic Party was awarded 15 Pollie Awards and three Reed Awards.

Bauman was regularly quoted by the Los Angeles Times and often appeared on CNN and KTTV Fox 11 News on issues relating to Los Angeles County and California Democratic politics. Bauman also made regular monthly appearances on Charter Communications' California Edition.

He was a senior adviser to the speaker of the California State Assembly, Anthony Rendon, and was previously for John Pérez and Toni Atkins, in addition to having been Governor Gray Davis' Southern California director, and having been Deputy Insurance Commissioner under then-Insurance Commissioner John Garamendi.

Before attending the 2016 Democratic National Convention as a PLEO delegate, Bauman was featured in a special edition of KNBC (NBC Los Angeles) News Conference with Conan Nolan.

Bauman put in a bid to be chair of the California Democratic Party in 2017, defeating his opponent Kimberly Ellis.

On May 20, 2017, he was elected chair of the California Democratic Party at the annual state convention. He was the first openly gay person and the first Jew to be chair of the party.

== Controversy ==
=== Sexual misconduct allegations ===
On November 29, 2018, Bauman resigned from his position as chair of the California Democratic Party after lawsuits alleged that he committed sexual harassment, discrimination and sexual assault. These included allegations by Bauman's assistant, William Floyd, that "Bauman forcibly performed oral sex on him several times and that the party failed to respond appropriately to Bauman’s behavior". In his lawsuit, "Floyd alleges Bauman threatened him, telling him "if you cross me, I will break you.""

The lawsuits were settled in 2020 for nearly $3 million.

=== Pharmaceutical consulting ===
Bauman was criticized for his ties to California's pharmaceutical industry. He lobbied against Proposition 61 which would have prohibited the state from buying drugs that are more expensive than the price the Department of Veterans Affairs pays. This criticism re-emerged following his election to become chair of the California Democratic Party.

== Personal life and death ==
Bauman lived in North Hollywood with his husband of many years, Michael Andraychak. His uncle is the musician Jon "Bowzer" Bauman, formerly of Sha Na Na.

In November 2018, the California Democratic Party vice chairman, Daraka Larimore-Hall, filed a complaint accusing Bauman of having sexually assaulted or harassed Larimore-Hall's staff members.

Bauman died at a hospital in Los Angeles, on June 16, 2025, following a long illness. He was 66.

Party political offices
Preceded by John L. Burton	Chair of the California Democratic Party; 2017–2018	Succeeded by Alex Gallardo-Rooker; Acting
