= Emerge California =

Emerge California is a non-profit organization and affiliate of Emerge America, created by Andrea Dew Steele, that seeks to identify and help more women and minorities in California be elected to public office. It was praised in 2017 by Hillary Clinton in an email, as a group that has impressed her since the 2016 election at helping get Democrats elected to office.
