= Emerge America =

American political organization that trains Democratic women to run for office

- Formation: 2002; 24 years ago (as Emerge California); 2005 (national organization)
- Type: Section 527 political organization
- Purpose: Recruiting and training Democratic women to run for public office
- Headquarters: San Francisco, California, and Washington, D.C.
- President and CEO: A'shanti Gholar
- Website: emergeamerica.org

Emerge America (also known simply as Emerge) is an American political organization that recruits, trains, and provides a network for Democratic women who want to run for public office. It grew out of Emerge California, founded in 2002, and became a national organization in 2005. The organization works through state-level affiliates and national training programs, and has offices in San Francisco and Washington, D.C. A'shanti Gholar has served as its president since February 2020.

== History ==
=== Founding and expansion ===
Emerge California was founded in 2002 by Andrea Dew Steele, Marya Stark, Dorka Keehn, and Lisa Witter. Under Steele's leadership, the model was expanded nationwide as Emerge America in 2005. The organization added affiliates in six states in its first year, and by 2017 it had affiliates in 23 states. In 2017 it announced a goal of having affiliates in all 50 states by 2020, a target it did not reach. Steele said the organization's longer-term aim was for women to hold at least 30 percent of government positions, a level she described as a critical mass for institutional change.

=== Growth after 2016 ===
Interest in Emerge's programs rose sharply after the 2016 presidential election. The organization reported an 87 percent increase in applications, and some state classes nearly doubled in size. In May 2017, Hillary Clinton named Emerge America as one of the first five partner groups of her new political organization, Onward Together; Clinton aides said Emerge was among the groups that had already received funding.

=== Leadership transition ===
Steele stepped down as president in May 2019. Amanda Renteria then served as interim president. In January 2020, the board named A'shanti Gholar, previously Emerge's national political director, as president, effective February 2020. Gholar, a co-founder of Emerge Nevada in 2006, is the first Black woman to lead the organization.

=== Organizational challenges (2022–2023) ===
In December 2023, The 19th reported that Emerge was facing turnover and financial strain in several states. The organization listed a presence in 27 states, but 18 had staff on the ground, and nine state executive director positions were vacant heading into 2024. At least seven state executive directors had left in the preceding three years.

Several affiliates closed or separated from the national organization. The Louisiana affiliate stopped local operations after its executive director left in early 2022, and the Alabama executive director was laid off in March 2023, after which the state moved to a regional training model. On July 12, 2023, Emerge America cut ties with its Colorado affiliate, citing an investigation into mismanagement. The affiliate's former leaders disputed that account and started a separate program, Women Uprising, in August 2023. Emerge said it planned to rebuild in Colorado.

The same report found that, according to federal tax filings, Emerge ended 2021 with a surplus of about $51,000, but spent $286,132 more than it raised in 2022. An Emerge spokesperson attributed the shortfall to a difficult fundraising environment.

=== Staff union ===
Emerge staff voted unanimously to unionize in May 2022 as Emerge United, affiliated with SEIU Local 205, and management voluntarily recognized the union. In 2023, the union said members had gone two years without raises; Emerge said it had raised salaries since 2020. A three-year first contract, which raised wages and expanded paid leave, was ratified on May 14, 2024.

== Organization and programs ==
Emerge America is organized as a 527 organization rather than a 501(c)(4) nonprofit; as a result, it discloses its donors and cannot receive grants that are restricted to nonprofits. Related entities include the Emerge Action Fund and a separate 501(c)(4) organization.

Its core offering is a candidate training program run by state affiliates, with instruction in areas such as public speaking, fundraising, and networking. The organization also runs national virtual trainings, shorter introductory sessions for women considering a run, and programs such as a Black Leadership Circle and a Young Leaders Cabinet.

== Alumni ==
As of 2023, about 1,300 Emerge alumni held elected office in 35 states, including a Cabinet secretary, eight members of Congress, and 24 statewide officials. Alumni won 74 percent of their races in the 2023 elections. By 2025, Emerge said it had trained more than 6,500 women. In the 2026 elections, Emerge Kentucky reported that 38 of its alumni won their races, a 70 percent win rate, including three seats flipped to Democrats.

Notable alumni include:

- Deb Haaland, U.S. Secretary of the Interior (2021–2025) and former U.S. representative from New Mexico, who completed Emerge New Mexico's program in 2007
- Becca Balint, U.S. representative from Vermont
- Kim Schrier, U.S. representative from Washington
- Shenna Bellows, Secretary of State of Maine
- Naquetta Ricks, member of the Colorado House of Representatives, whom Emerge advised during her 2020 campaign

== Reception ==
Clinton praised Emerge in 2017 for training diverse Democratic women candidates, and its inclusion among Onward Together's first partners drew national attention to the group. In 2023, The 19th described Emerge as the leading organization in recruiting and training Democratic women, while reporting that its rapid national growth had come with affiliate instability, staff discontent, and budget deficits.

== See also ==
- EMILY's List
- Run for Something
- She Should Run
- Women in the United States House of Representatives
