= 2024 Maryland's 6th congressional district election =

- November 5, 2024
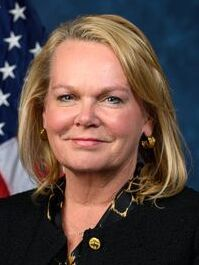

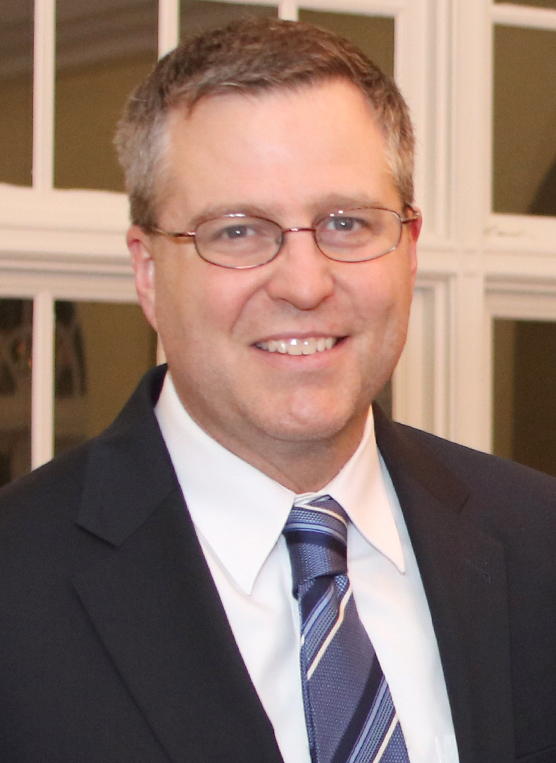
Nominee	April McClain Delaney	Neil Parrott
Party	Democratic	Republican
Popular vote	199,788	175,974
Percentage	53.05%	46.72%
- McClain Delaney: 50–60% 60–70% 70–80% 80–90% Parrott: 40–50% 50–60% 60–70% 70–80% 80–90%
U.S. Representative before election
David Trone
Democratic
Elected U.S. Representative
April McClain Delaney
Democratic

The 2024 Maryland's 6th congressional district election was held on November 5, 2024, to elect the United States representative for Maryland's 6th congressional district, concurrently with elections for the other U.S. House districts in Maryland and the rest of the country, the 2024 U.S. Senate race in Maryland, other elections to the United States Senate, and various state and local elections. The primary election was held on May 14, 2024. The 6th district is based in western Maryland and the northwest District of Columbia exurbs and outer suburbs. It takes in all of Allegany, Frederick, Garrett, and Washington counties, as well as portions of Montgomery County. Cities in the district include Cumberland, Frederick, Gaithersburg, Germantown, and Hagerstown.

The incumbent was Democrat David Trone, who was re-elected with 54.7% of the vote in 2022. Trone was first elected in 2018, when Democratic incumbent John Delaney retired to focus on his 2020 presidential campaign. Trone did not seek re-election, instead choosing to run for the U.S. Senate to succeed retiring incumbent Democrat Ben Cardin. A wide field of candidates filed for the race to replace Trone, with over 15 in all. Maryland Matters remarked that both Democrats and Republicans would need to find a candidate with a wide appeal, as the 6th district is largely split between suburban and rural areas. The Washington Post further noted that Democrats outnumber registered Republicans by seven percentage points in the district.

The 6th district is considered the most competitive congressional district in the state of Maryland, despite being a moderately blue largely suburban district with a more sparsely populated rural component. While Republicans typically run up large margins in the state's Western Panhandle (Washington, Allegany, and Garrett counties), the district has a slight Democratic lean due to the more heavily populated, strongly Democratic Montgomery County, and the former Republican stronghold of Frederick County, which has trended towards the Democrats in recent elections. Republicans last won the district in 2010, when long-serving Republican Roscoe Bartlett was elected to his final term; he lost re-election to Delaney in 2012 after the district became significantly more favorable to the Democratic Party during redistricting. Democrat Joe Biden won the district with 53.9% of the vote in the 2020 presidential election.

This district was listed on both the National Republican Congressional Committee's Young Guns program and the Democratic Congressional Campaign Committee's Red-to-Blue program. McClain Delaney won the general election on November 5, 2024, defeating Parrott with 53.05% of the vote.

== Democratic primary ==
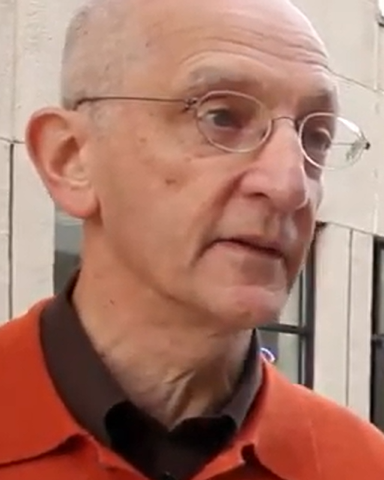
George Gluck

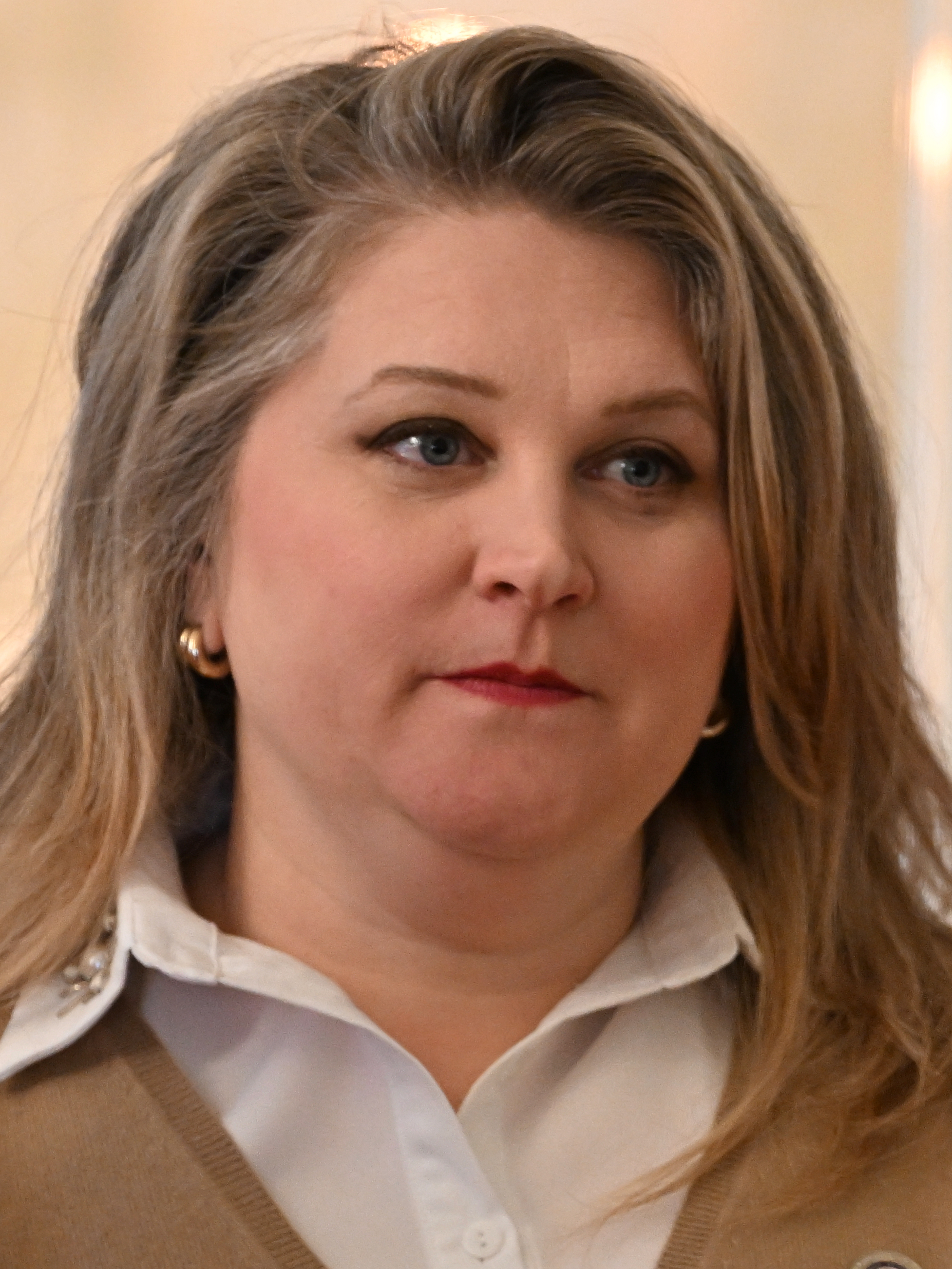
Lesley Lopez

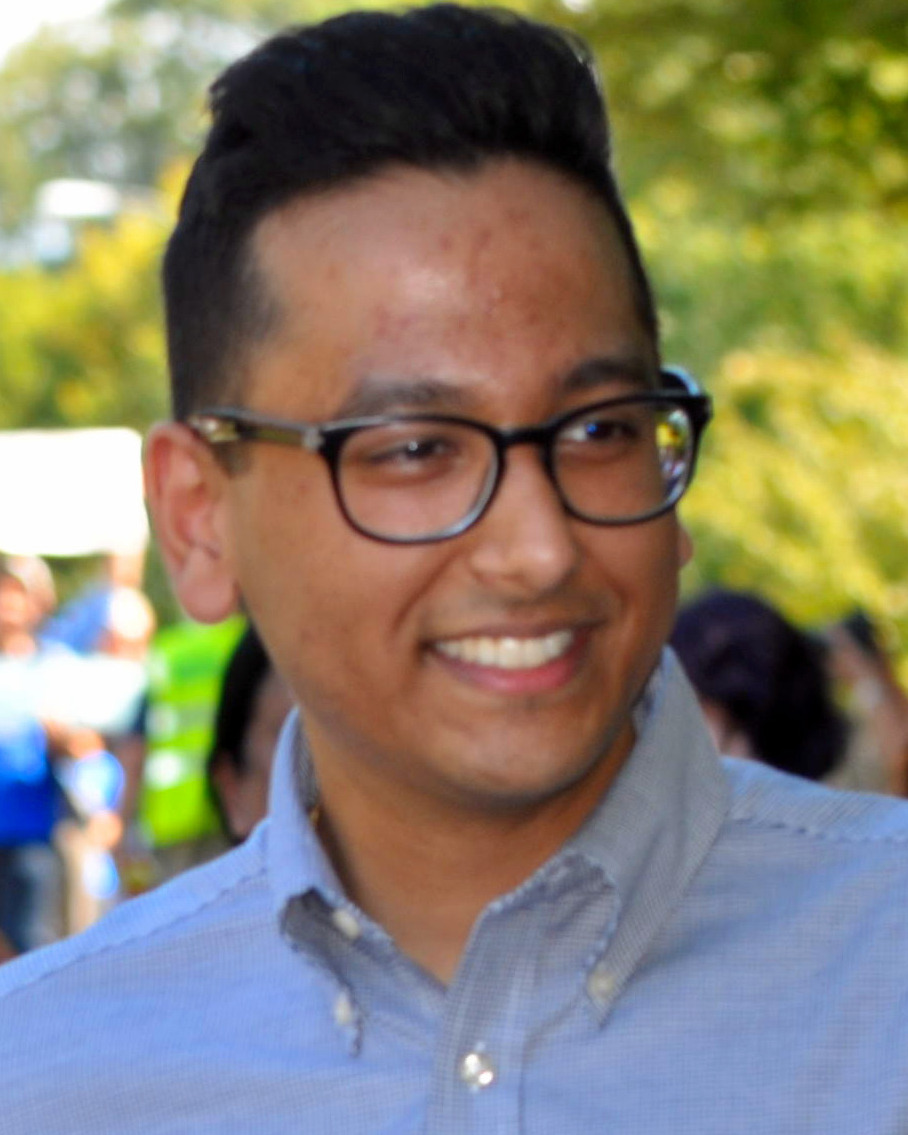
Ashwani Jain

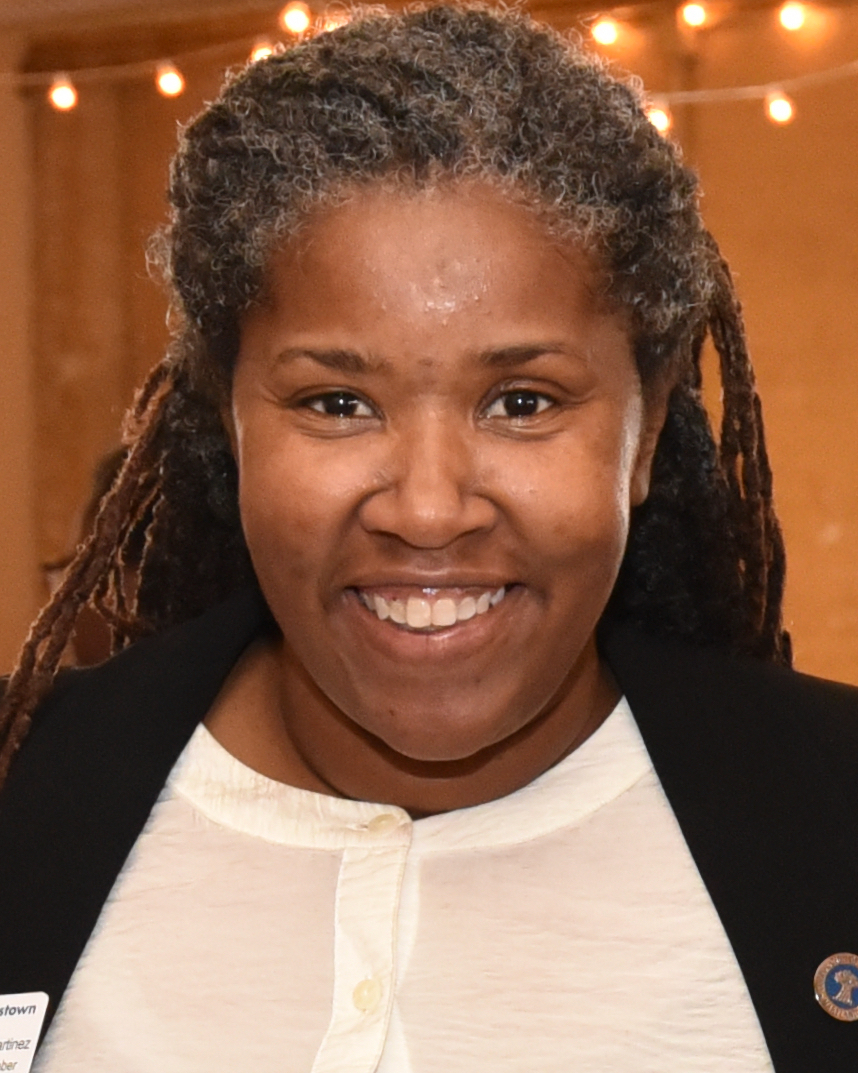
Tekesha Martinez

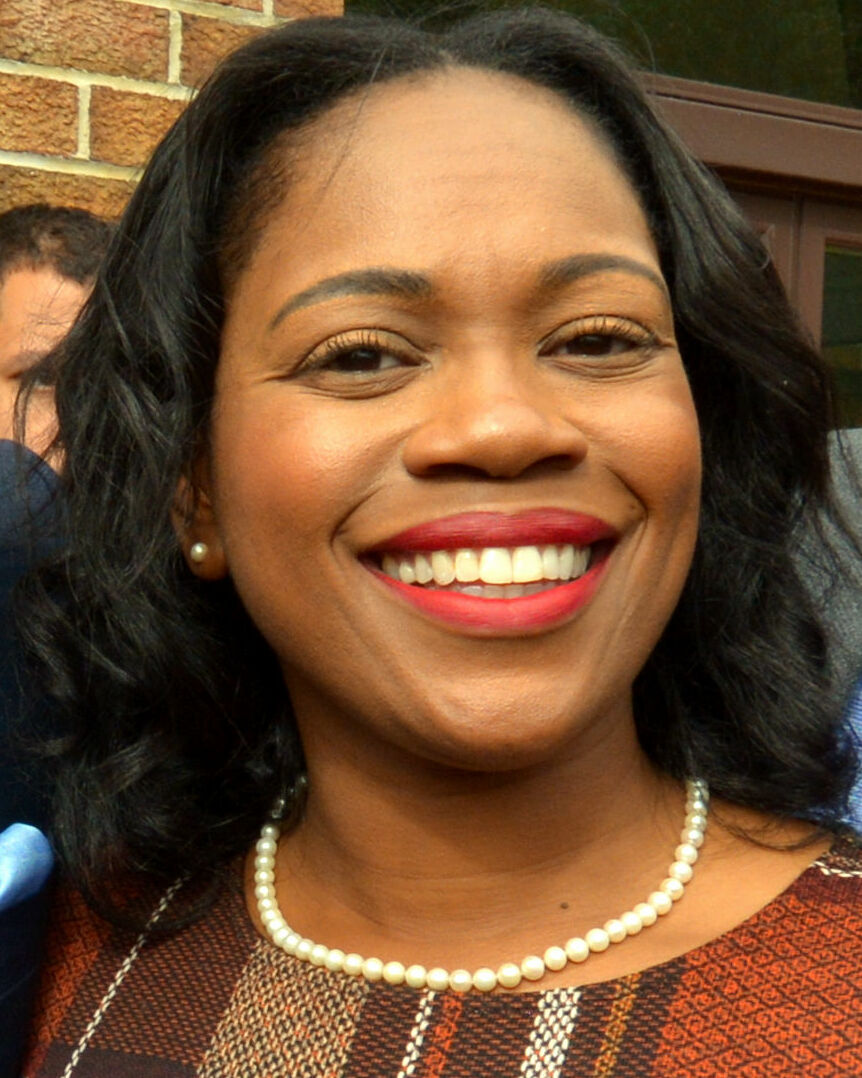
Laurie-Anne Sayles

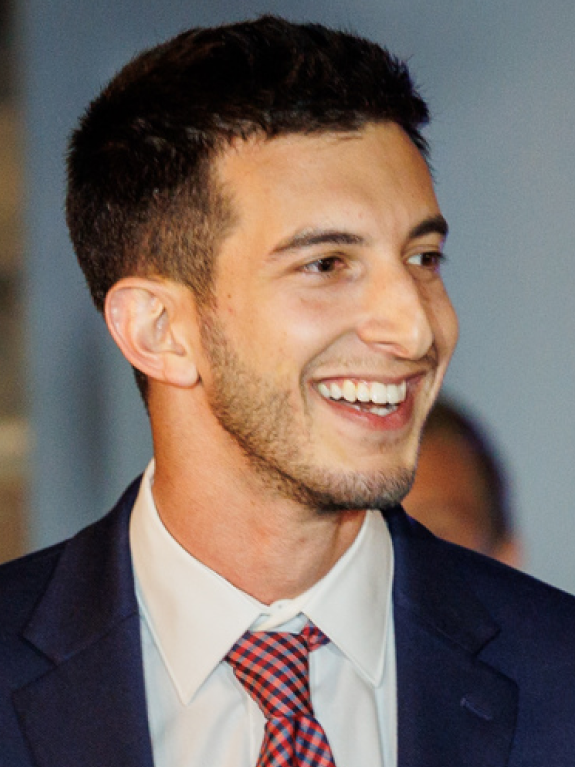
Joe Vogel

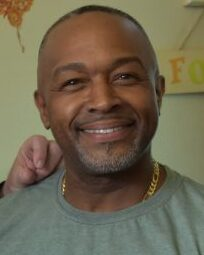
Altimont Wilks

=== Candidates ===
==== Nominee ====
- April McClain Delaney, former deputy administrator of the National Telecommunications and Information Administration and wife of former U.S. Representative John Delaney

==== Eliminated in primary ====
- George Gluck, IT consultant and perennial candidate
- Ashwani Jain, former Obama administration official and candidate for governor of Maryland in 2022
- Lesley Lopez, state delegate from the 39th district (2019–present)
- Tekesha Martinez, mayor of Hagerstown (2023–present)
- Mohammad Mozumder, retired scientist
- Adrian Petrus, security guard and perennial candidate
- Laurie-Anne Sayles, at-large Montgomery County councilor (2022–present)
- Joe Vogel, state delegate from the 17th district (2023–present)
- Destiny Drake West, think tank founder and former senior program specialist at the U.S. Department of Housing and Urban Development
- Kiambo White, union representative
- Altimont Wilks, grocery store owner

==== Withdrawn ====
- Peter Choharis, attorney (remained on ballot, endorsed McClain Delaney)
- Geoffrey Grammer, retired U.S. Army colonel and physician (remained on ballot, endorsed McClain Delaney)
- Mia Mason, military veteran and nominee for the 1st district in 2020
- Stephen McDow, economist and businessman (remained on ballot)
- Joel Martin Rubin, former vice mayor of Chevy Chase and candidate for the 8th district in 2016 (remained on ballot, endorsed McClain Delaney)

==== Declined ====
- Jud Ashman, mayor of Gaithersburg (2014–present)
- Marilyn Balcombe, Montgomery County councilor from the 2nd district (2022–present)
- Brian Feldman, state senator from the 15th district (2013–present)
- Jan Gardner, former Frederick County executive (2014–2022) (endorsed McClain Delaney)
- Emily Keller, Maryland special secretary of opioid response (2023–present) and former mayor of Hagerstown (2020–2023)
- Aruna Miller, lieutenant governor of Maryland (2023–present) and candidate for this district in 2018
- Craig Rice, former Montgomery County councilor from the 2nd district (2010–2022) and former state delegate from the 15th district (2007–2010)
- David Trone, incumbent U.S. representative (ran for U.S. Senate)
- Brad Young, Frederick County Council president (2022–present) (endorsed Vogel)
- Karen Lewis Young, state senator from the 3rd district (2023–present) (endorsed McClain Delaney)

=== Endorsements ===
Ashwani Jain

Organizations

- Maryland Forward Party
Lesley Lopez

State cabinet officials

- Gloria Lawlah, former Maryland secretary of aging (2007–2015) and state senator for the 26th district (1991–2007)

State legislators

- Pamela Beidle, state senator for the 23nd district (2019–present)
- Sarah Elfreth, state senator for the 30th district (2019–present)
- Dawn Gile, state senator for the 33rd district (2023–present)
- Nancy King, majority leader of the Maryland Senate (2020–present) from the 39th district (2007–present)
- 24 state delegates

Organizations

- Vote Mama

Labor unions

- Service Employees International Union Local 500
- Teamsters Local 992
Tekesha Martinez

Organizations

- J Street (co-endorsed with Vogel)
- National Organization for Women PAC
April McClain Delaney

U.S. representatives

- Lois Frankel, FL-22 (2013–present)
- Steny Hoyer, MD-05 (1981–present)
- Nancy Pelosi, speaker emerita (2007–2011, 2019–2023) from CA-11 (1987–present)
- Jamie Raskin, MD-08 (2017–present)
- Dutch Ruppersberger, MD-02 (2003–present)

State legislators

- Lily Qi, state delegate from the 15th district (2019–present)
- Karen Lewis Young, state senator from the 3rd district (2023–present)
- Ronald Young, state senator from the 3rd district (2011–2023)

County officials

- Jan Gardner, former Frederick County executive (2014–2022)

Local officials

- Joel Martin Rubin, former vice mayor of Chevy Chase (2017–2023)

Party officials

- Terry Lierman, former chair of the Maryland Democratic Party (2004–2007)
- Kathleen Matthews, former chair of the Maryland Democratic Party (2017–2018)

Labor unions

- United Auto Workers

Newspapers

- The Washington Post (Democratic primary only)
Laurie-Anne Sayles

Organizations

- Vote Common Good (co-endorsed with West)
Joe Vogel

U.S. senators

- Cory Booker, New Jersey (2013–present)

U.S. representatives

- Becca Balint, VT-AL (2023–present)
- Teresa Leger Fernandez, NM-03 (2021–present)
- Robert Garcia, CA-42 (2023–present)
- Zoe Lofgren, CA-18 (1995–present)
- Chris Pappas, NH-01 (2019–present)
- Max Rose, NY-11 (2019–2021)
- Andrea Salinas, OR-06 (2023–present)
- Linda Sánchez, CA-38 (2003–present)
- Eric Sorensen, IL-17 (2023–present)
- Mark Takano, CA-39 (2013–present)
- Ritchie Torres, NY-15 (2021–present)

State delegates

- Ana Sol Gutierrez, 18th district (2003–2019)
- Chao Wu, district 9A (2023–present)

Local officials

- Annise Parker, former mayor of Houston, Texas (2010–2016) and president of LGBTQ+ Victory Fund

Organizations

- CHC BOLD PAC
- College Democrats of America
- Equality PAC
- Harvard College Democrats
- Human Rights Campaign
- J Street (co-endorsed with Martinez)
- Latino Victory Fund
- LGBTQ+ Victory Fund
- Sierra Club National and Maryland chapters
- Voters of Tomorrow

Labor unions

- Amalgamated Transit Union Locals 689 and 1777
- Association of Flight Attendants
- Laborers' International Union of North America Philadelphia/Baltimore/Washington and West Virginia/Appalachian District Councils
- National Education Association
- UNITE HERE Local 7

Newspapers

- Washington Jewish Week
Destiny Drake West

Organizations

- Vote Common Good (co-endorsed with Sayles)
Geoffrey Grammer (withdrawn)

U.S. senators

- John Fetterman, Pennsylvania (2023–present)

Organizations

- ~~With Honor Fund~~ (switched endorsement to Royals after Grammer withdrew)

Labor unions

- International Association of Heat and Frost Insulators and Allied Workers Local 2

=== Debates and forums ===
2024 Maryland's 6th congressional district Democratic primary debates
No.	Date	Host	Moderator	Link	Participants									
P Participant A Absent N Non-invitee I Invitee W Withdrawn														
P Participant A Absent N Non-invitee I Invitee W Withdrawn					Gluck	Jain	Lopez	Martinez	McClain Delaney	Sayles	Vogel	West	Wilks	Others
1	Feb 19, 2024	Washington County Democratic; Central Committee	Kalim Johnson	Facebook	P	P	P	P	P	P	P	P	P	P (Note: Geoffrey Grammer and Joel Martin Rubin)
2	Mar 6, 2024	Montgomery County; UpCounty Democrats	Andrew Saundry	YouTube	P	N	N	P	P	N	N	P	N	–
3	Mar 13, 2024	Jewish Democratic Council of America	Halie Soifer	YouTube	A	P	A	A	P	P	P	A	A	P (Note: Geoffrey Grammer)
4	Mar 20, 2024	Montgomery County; UpCounty Democrats	Andrew Saundry	YouTube	N	P	N	N	N	P	P	N	P	P (Note: Mohammad Mozumder and Kiambo White)
5	Mar 24, 2024	Frederick County Democratic; Central Committee	Bob Kresslein	N/A	P	P	P	P	P	P	P	P	P	–
6	Mar 28, 2024	Garrett County Democratic; Central Committee	Lillia Rose	Facebook	P	P	A	P	P	P	P	P	A	–
7	Apr 6, 2024	Washington County NAACP	Eddie Peters	Facebook	P	P	P	A	P	P	P	P	P	P (Note: Peter Choharis and Mohammad Mozumder)
8	Apr 11, 2024; Apr 16, 2024; Apr 23, 2024	Frederick County League of Women Voters	Betty Mayfield; Michael Powell	YouTube I YouTube II; YouTube III	P	P	P	A	P	P	P	A	A	P (Note: Peter Choharis and Kiambo White)
9	Apr 21, 2024	Association of Black Democrats of Montgomery County; Latino Democratic Club of Montgomery County	Cheyanne Daniels	Facebook	P	P	P	A	A	P	P	A	A	P (Note: Peter Choharis)
10	Apr 28, 2024	Montgomery County Women's; Democratic Club	Brian Karem	YouTube	P	P	P	P	P	P	P	A	A	P (Note: Peter Choharis and Mohammad Mozumder)

=== Fundraising ===
Italics indicate a withdrawn candidate.

Campaign finance reports as of June 30, 2024
Candidate	Raised	Spent	Cash on hand
George Gluck (D)	$10,291	$10,783	$408
Ashwani Jain (D)	$105,164 (Note: $30,000 of this total was self-funded by Jain.)	$109,695	$0
Lesley Lopez (D)	$193,446	$189,956	$3,490
Tekesha Martinez (D)	$628,572 (Note: $4,908 of this total was self-funded by Martinez.)	$424,360	$70,061
April McClain Delaney (D)	$2,974,706 (Note: $1,875,000 of this total was self-funded by McClain Delaney.)	$2,757,607	$217,099
Laurie-Anne Sayles (D)	$77,074	$74,773	$2,301
Joe Vogel (D)	$792,054	$744,766	$47,288
Destiny Drake West (D)	$15,880	$16,092	$64
Altimont Wilks (D)	$3,375	$3,170	$205
Peter Choharis (D)	$109,293 (Note: $25,000 of this total was self-funded by Choharis.)	$69,612	$39,681
Geoffrey Grammer (D)	$551,059 (Note: $439,689 of this total was self-funded by Grammer.)	$550,661	$0
Joel Martin Rubin (D)	$133,133	$133,133	$0
Source: Federal Election Commission

=== Polling ===
Poll source	Date(s) administered	Sample size (Note: Key: A – all adults RV – registered voters LV – likely voters V – unclear)	Margin of error	Geoffrey Grammer	Lesley Lopez	Tekesha Martinez	April McClain Delaney	Joel Martin Rubin	Joe Vogel	Other	Undecided
Garin-Hart-Yang Research Group (Note: Poll sponsored by McClain Delaney's campaign)	May 6–7, 2024	400 (LV)	± 5.0%	–	–	–	37%	–	24%	17%	22%
Public Policy Polling (Note: Poll sponsored by Equality PAC, which supports Vogel.)	April 25–26, 2024	558 (LV)	± 4.2%	–	4%	8%	24%	–	24%	4%	36%
GBAO (Note: Poll sponsored by Vogel's campaign.)	March 14–17, 2024	500 (LV)	± 4.4%	5%	8%	8%	17%	–	10%	4%	48%
RMG Research (Note: Poll sponsored by U.S. Term Limits. Vogel has signed the group's term-limit pledge.)	November 14–17, 2023	300 (LV)	± 5.7%	3%	3%	6%	5%	1%	3%	5%	74%

=== Results ===
Results by county McClain Delaney: 30–40%; 40–50%

Democratic primary results
Party	Candidate	Votes	%
Democratic	April McClain Delaney	22,985	40.4
Democratic	Joe Vogel	14,940	26.3
Democratic	Ashwani Jain	4,750	8.3
Democratic	Tekesha Martinez	3,992	7.0
Democratic	Lesley Lopez	2,600	4.6
Democratic	Laurie-Anne Sayles	1,845	3.2
Democratic	Destiny Drake West	1,086	1.9
Democratic	Mohammad Mozumder	1,005	1.7
Democratic	Joel Martin Rubin (withdrawn)	820	1.4
Democratic	Peter Choharis (withdrawn)	818	1.4
Democratic	Geoffrey Grammer (withdrawn)	651	1.1
Democratic	George Gluck	437	0.8
Democratic	Kiambo White	401	0.7
Democratic	Stephen McDow (withdrawn)	246	0.4
Democratic	Altimont Wilks	179	0.3
Democratic	Adrian Petrus	166	0.3
Total votes		56,921	100.0

== Republican primary ==
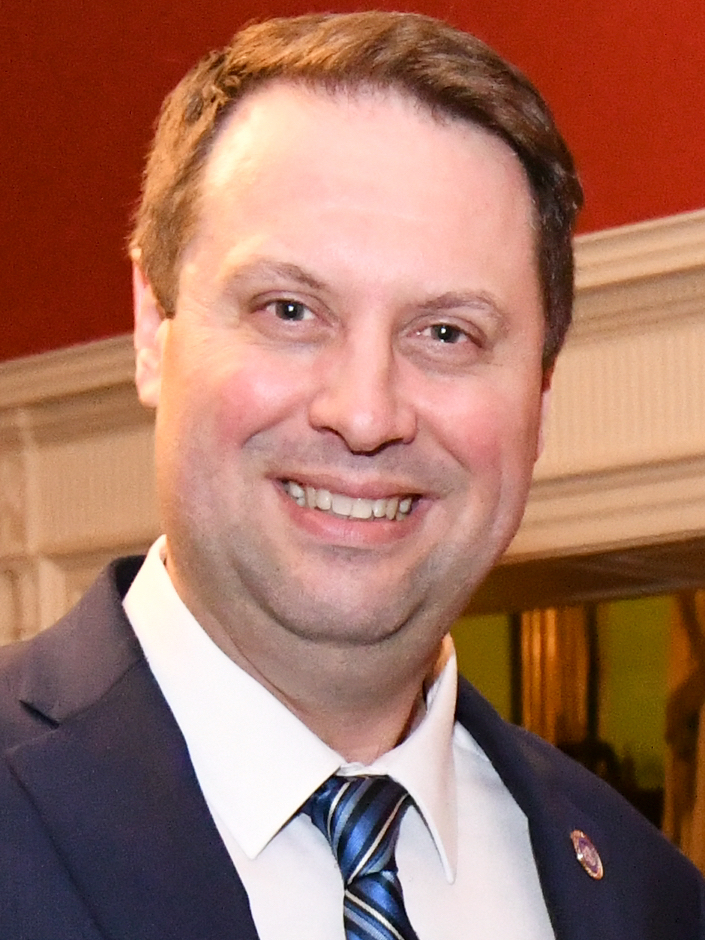
Dan Cox

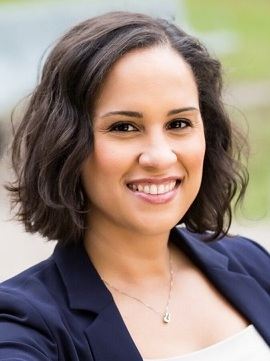
Mariela Roca

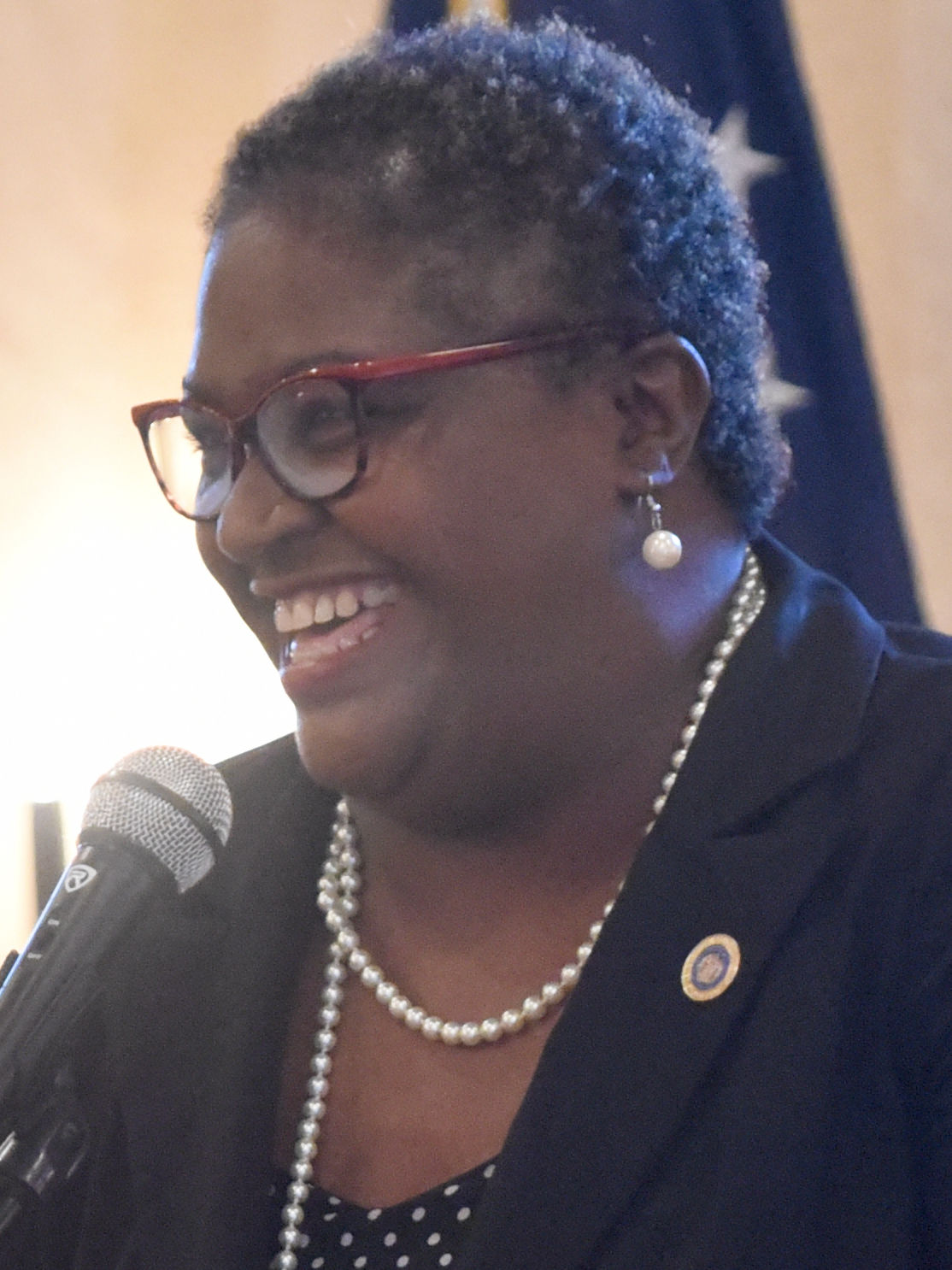
Brenda Thiam

=== Candidates ===
==== Nominee ====
- Neil Parrott, former state delegate from district 2A (2015–2023) and nominee for this district in 2020 and 2022

==== Eliminated in primary ====
- Dan Cox, former state delegate from the 4th district (2019–2023), nominee for governor of Maryland in 2022, and nominee for the 8th district in 2016
- Chris Hyser, retired state trooper
- Mariela Roca, medical logistics specialist and candidate for this district in 2022
- Tom Royals, business development manager and former U.S. Navy officer
- Brenda Thiam, former state delegate from district 2B (2020–2023)

==== Withdrawn ====
- Heath Barnes, burgess (Note: Mayor) of Woodsboro (2021–present) (endorsed Thiam)
- Todd Puglisi, grocery store clerk and candidate for U.S. Senate in 2022

==== Declined ====
- Jason Buckel, minority leader of the Maryland House of Delegates (2021–present) from district 1B (2015–present)
- Michael Hough, former state senator from the 4th district (2015–2023) and nominee for Frederick County executive in 2022
- J. Charles Smith III, Frederick County state's attorney (2007–present)

=== Endorsements ===
Neil Parrott

U.S. representatives

- Bob Good, chair of the Freedom Caucus (2024) from VA-05 (2021–present)
- Jody Hice, GA-10 (2015–2023)

State legislators

- Johnny Ray Salling, state senator from the 6th district (2015–present)

Organizations

- Conservative Political Action Committee
- Family Research Council Action PAC
- House Freedom Fund
Mariela Roca

U.S. representatives

- Newt Gingrich, former speaker of the U.S. House of Representatives (1995–1999) from GA-06 (1979–1999)
Tom Royals

Organizations

- With Honor Fund (previously endorsed Grammer)

Newspapers

- The Washington Post (Republican primary only)

=== Debates and forums ===
2024 Maryland's 6th congressional district Republican primary debates
No.	Date	Host	Moderator	Link	Participants							
P Participant A Absent N Non-invitee I Invitee W Withdrawn O Not yet entered race												
P Participant A Absent N Non-invitee I Invitee W Withdrawn O Not yet entered race					Heath Barnes	Dan Cox	Chris Hyser	Neil Parrott	Todd Puglisi	Mariela Roca	Tom Royals	Brenda Thiam
1	Sept 20, 2023	Upper Montgomery; Republican Women's Club	David Bossie	YouTube	P	O	P	O	P	P	P	P
2	Feb 12, 2024	Frederick County; Conservative Club	Matthew Foldi; Jonathan Jenkins	N/A	W	P	P	O	W	A	P	P
3	Feb 15, 2024	Legislative District 15; Republican Club	Dan Cuda	N/A	W	P	P	P	W	P	P	P
4	Feb 17, 2024	Garrett County Republican; Central Committee; Garrett County Republican; Women's Club	Dirk Haire	YouTube	W	P	P	P	W	P	P	P
5	Apr 6, 2024	Washington County NAACP	Eddie Peters	Facebook	W	A	P	A	W	A	A	P
6	Apr 18, 2024	Frederick County League of Women Voters	Betty Mayfield	YouTube	W	A	P	A	W	P	A	P

=== Fundraising ===
Italics indicate a withdrawn candidate.

Campaign finance reports as of June 30, 2024
Candidate	Raised	Spent	Cash on hand
Dan Cox (R)	$160,715 (Note: $12,225 of this total was self-funded by Cox.)	$160,684	$30
Chris Hyser (R)	$167,256 (Note: $132,268 of this total was self-funded by Hyser.)	$43,353	$123,902
Neil Parrott (R)	$630,004	$465,867	$222,395
Mariela Roca (R)	$289,671	$283,146	$6,551
Tom Royals (R)	$558,497	$553,752	$4,745
Brenda Thiam (R)	$49,520 (Note: $30,670 of this total was self-funded by Thiam.)	$35,474	$14,046
Heath Barnes (R)	$34,373	$34,373	$0
Source: Federal Election Commission

=== Results ===
Results by county Parrott: 30–40%; 40–50%; 60–70%

Republican primary results
Party	Candidate	Votes	%
Republican	Neil Parrott	22,604	45.9
Republican	Dan Cox	14,797	30.1
Republican	Mariela Roca	6,071	12.3
Republican	Tom Royals	2,060	4.2
Republican	Chris Hyser	1,625	3.3
Republican	Brenda Thiam	1,607	3.3
Republican	Todd Puglisi (withdrawn)	446	0.9
Total votes		49,210	100.0

== Third-party and independent candidates ==
=== Candidates ===
==== Failed to qualify ====
- Jason "Mr. J" Johnson (Forward Party), member of the Frederick County Board of Education (2020–present)

== General election ==
=== Predictions ===
Source	Ranking	As of
The Cook Political Report	Lean D	November 1, 2024
Inside Elections	Lean D	October 31, 2024
Sabato's Crystal Ball	Lean D	November 4, 2024
Elections Daily	Safe D	October 5, 2023
CNalysis	Very Likely D	November 16, 2023

=== Post-primary endorsements ===
April McClain Delaney (D)

U.S. senators

- Mark Warner, Virginia (2009–present)

U.S. representatives

- Katherine Clark, House minority whip (2023–present) from MA-05 (2013–present)
- John Delaney, MD-06 (2013–2019) (candidate's husband)
- Suzan DelBene, WA-01 (2012–present)
- David Trone, MD-06 (2019–present)

Statewide officials

- Wes Moore, governor of Maryland (2023–present)

State legislators

- Sarah Elfreth, state senator from the 30th district (2019–present)
- Kris Fair, state delegate from the 3rd district (2023–present)
- Cheryl Kagan, state senator from the 17th district (2015–present)
- Joe Vogel, state delegate from the 17th district (2023–present)

County officials

- Angela Alsobrooks, Prince George's County executive (2018–present) and Democratic nominee in the 2024 United States Senate election in Maryland
- Marc Elrich, Montgomery County executive (2018–present)

Local officials

- Tekesha Martinez, mayor of Hagerstown (2023–present)

Individuals

- Harry Dunn, former U.S. Capitol Police officer

Party officials

- Ken Ulman, chair of the Maryland Democratic Party (2023–present) and former Howard County executive (2006–2014)

Organizations

- AIPAC
- Brady PAC
- Democratic Congressional Campaign Committee
- Democratic Majority for Israel
- EMILY's List
- Everytown for Gun Safety
- Feminist Majority PAC
- Giffords
- Human Rights Campaign
- National Committee to Preserve Social Security and Medicare
- NewDem Action Fund
- Planned Parenthood Action Fund
- Reproductive Freedom for All
- Sierra Club

Labor unions

- American Federation of State, County and Municipal Employees
- International Association of Machinists and Aerospace Workers
- Maryland State & D.C. AFL-CIO
- Maryland State Education Association
- National Education Association
- Service Employees International Union Local 500
- SMART Union
- Teamsters Local 639
- United Food and Commercial Workers Local 1994 MCGEO
Neil Parrott (R)

U.S. representatives

- Tom Emmer, House majority whip (2023–present) from MN-06 (2015–present)
- Andy Harris, chair of the House Freedom Caucus (2024–present) from MD-01 (2011–present)
- Mike Johnson, speaker of the U.S. House of Representatives (2023–present) from LA-04 (2017–present)
- Jim Jordan, OH-04 (2007–present)
- Steve Scalise, House majority leader (2023–present) from LA-01 (2008–present)

State legislators

- Jason C. Buckel, minority leader of the Maryland House of Delegates (2021–present) from district 1B (2015–present)

County officials

- Chuck Jenkins, Frederick County sheriff (2006–present)

Individuals

- Stephen Moore, conservative economist and commentator

Organizations

- National Republican Congressional Committee
- National Right to Life Committee
- Susan B. Anthony Pro-Life America

=== Debates and forums ===
2024 Maryland's 6th congressional district general election debates
No.	Date	Host	Moderator	Link	Participants	
P Participant A Absent N Non-invitee I Invitee W Withdrawn						
P Participant A Absent N Non-invitee I Invitee W Withdrawn					McClain Delaney	Parrott
1	Oct 6, 2024	Frederick County; League of Women Voters; Hood College	Sara Malec	YouTube	P	P
2	Oct 15, 2024	WJLA-TV	Scott Thuman	Video	A	P
3	Oct 16, 2024	Washington County; Chamber of Commerce	Richard Willson	YouTube	P	P
4	Oct 29, 2024; Oct 31, 2024	JCRC of Greater Washington	Deborah Miller	YouTube I YouTube II	P	P

=== Fundraising ===
Campaign finance reports as of November 25, 2024
Candidate	Raised	Spent	Cash on hand
April McClain Delaney (D)	$5,937,425 (Note: $3,873,000 of this total was self-funded by McClain Delaney.)	$5,844,391	$93,034
Neil Parrott (R)	$1,056,387	$1,083,843	$2,914
Source: Federal Election Commission

=== Polling ===
Poll source	Date(s) administered	Sample size	Margin of error	April McClain Delaney (D)	Neil Parrott (R)	Other	Undecided
DecipherAi (R) (Note: Poll sponsored by Parrott's campaign and the National Republican Congressional Committee)	October 14–16, 2024	700 (LV)	± 4.0%	41%	45%	–	14%
Gonzales Research	August 24–31, 2024	317 (RV)	± 5.6%	39%	41%	–	20%
Public Opinion Strategies (R)	August 6–11, 2024	400 (LV)	± 4.9%	42%	40%	4%	13%

=== Results ===
2024 Maryland's 6th congressional district election
Party	Candidate	Votes	%	±%
Democratic	April McClain Delaney	199,788	53.05%	−1.67%
Republican	Neil Parrott	175,974	46.72%	+1.57%
Write-in		862	0.23%	+0.10%
Total votes		376,624	100.00%	
Democratic hold				

==== By county ====
County	April Delaney Democratic		Neil Parrott Republican		Various candidates Other parties		Margin		Total
County	#	%	#	%	#	%	#	%	Total
Allegany	9,785	32.0%	20,668	67.7%	78	0.3%	-10,883	-35.7%	30,531
Frederick	82,054	54.3%	68,828	45.5%	327	0.2%	13,226	8.8%	151,209
Garrett	3,461	22.5%	11,908	77.4%	17	0.1%	-8,447	-54.9%	15,386
Montgomery (part)	76,924	70.9%	31,300	28.8%	301	0.3%	45,624	42.1%	108,525
Washington	27,564	38.8%	43,270	61.0%	139	0.2%	-15,706	-22.2%	70,973
Totals	199,788	53.0%	175,974	46.7%	862	0.2%	23,814	6.3%	376,624

== Notes ==
Partisan clients
