= 2024 Maryland elections =

A general election was held in the U.S. state of Maryland on November 5, 2024. In addition to the U.S. presidential race, Maryland voters elected all of its seats in the United States House of Representatives, and one of its U.S. senators. Various municipal elections, including in Cecil County, Baltimore, and the city of Hagerstown, were also held.

Polls were open from 7 AM to 8 PM EST.

== Federal offices ==
=== President of the United States ===
Maryland is represented by 10 electors in the electoral college.

=== United States Senate ===
Incumbent three-term Democratic Senator Ben Cardin was reelected in 2018 with 64.9% of the vote. On May 1, 2023, he announced that he would not be seeking reelection to a fourth term in office. Democratic candidates for the office include Prince George's County Executive Angela Alsobrooks and U.S. Representative David Trone, while Republican candidates include former governor Larry Hogan and perennial candidate Robin Ficker.

Alsobrooks and Hogan won their respective primaries on May 14, 2024, and faced off in the general election.

=== United States House of Representatives ===
All eight of Maryland's seats in the United States House of Representatives are up for election in 2024, of which three are open seats.

== Ballot propositions ==
Maryland 2024 ballot propositions
Proposition	Description	Result	Yes		No	
Proposition	Description	Result	Votes	%	Votes	%
Question 1	Enshrines the right to reproductive freedom in the state constitution.	Yes	2,199,319	76.06	692,219	23.94

=== Polling ===
On a referendum strengthening abortion rights

Poll source	Date(s) administered	Sample size (Note: Key: A – all adults RV – registered voters LV – likely voters V – unclear)	Margin of error	For	Against	Other/ Undecided
YouGov (Note: Poll sponsored by the University of Maryland, College Park.)	October 23–27, 2024	500 (LV)	± 5.2%	75%	18%	7% (Note: 1% with "Would not vote on this ballot measure")
University of Maryland, Baltimore County	September 23–28, 2024	862 (LV)	± 3.3%	69%	21%	10%
OpinionWorks	October 20–23, 2022	982 (LV)	± 3.1%	71%	19%	11%
University of Maryland	September 22–27, 2022	810 (RV)	± 4.0%	78%	16%	5%

== Municipal elections ==
=== Baltimore ===
==== Mayor ====
Incumbent Brandon Scott was first elected in 2020 with 70.5% of the vote and ran for re-election to a second term. He faced primary challenges from former mayor Sheila Dixon and perennial candidate Thiru Vignarajah. Vignarajah withdrew from the race and endorsed Dixon on May 1, 2024, but would still appear on the primary election ballot and have votes cast by mail for him counted.

Scott won the Democratic primary on May 14, 2024.

==== Polling ====
On the mayoral election

Poll source	Date(s) administered	Sample size (Note: Key: A – all adults RV – registered voters LV – likely voters V – unclear)	Margin of error	Sheila Dixon	Brandon Scott	Thiru Vignarajah	Bob Wallace	Other	Undecided
OpinionWorks (Note: This poll was sponsored by The Baltimore Sun and WBFF)	April 7–11, 2024	508 (LV)	± 4.3%	35%	38%	10%	4%	5% (Note: Wendy Bozel, Kevin Harris, Joseph Scott, Texas Brown, and "Someone else" with 1%)	7%
Goucher College	April 3–7, 2024	440 (RV)	± 4.7%	32%	40%	11%	3%	3% (Note: "Some other candidate" with 2%, "Refused" with 1%)	10%
Garin-Hart-Yang Research Group (Note: Poll sponsored by Sheila Dixon)	February 24–26, 2024	400 (LV)	± 5%	40%	37%	10%	6%	–	8%
Lake Research Partners	October 16–22, 2023	800 (LV)	± 3.5%	39%	31%	–	10%	–	15%
Goucher College	September 19–23, 2023	537 (RV)	± 4.2%	39%	27%	–	–	23% (Note: "Some other candidate" with 23%. 33% of those voters lean Dixon, 36% lean Scott, and 21% reported no lean or said they wouldn't for either)	8%

Hypothetical polling

Poll source	Date(s) administered	Sample size	Margin of error	Eric Costello	Sheila Dixon	Bill Henry	Jayne Miller	Brandon Scott	Thiru Vignarajah	Undecided
Lake Research Partners (Note: Poll was sponsored by Bill Henry)	Late March 2023	500 (LV)	± 4.4%	3%	18%	6%	7%	21%	11%	34%

On the city council president election

Poll source	Date(s) administered	Sample size	Margin of error	Zeke Cohen	Nick Mosby	Shannon Sneed	Other	Undecided
OpinionWorks (Note: Poll sponsored by The Baltimore Sun and WBFF)	April 7–11, 2024	508 (LV)	± 4.3%	40%	21%	17%	3%	19%
Goucher College (Note: Poll sponsored by The Baltimore Banner)	April 3–7, 2024	508 (LV)	± 4.3%	27%	23%	17%	14%	20%
Global Strategy Group (Note: Poll sponsored by Zeke Cohen's campaign)	February 15–20, 2024	400 (LV)	± 4.3%	31%	22%	18%	5%	24%
	October 20, 2023	Shannon Sneed enters the race						
Goucher College	September 19–23, 2023	537 (RV)	± 4.2%	30%	17%	–	34%	18%
Global Strategy Group	May 31 – June 1, 2023	702 (LV)	± 3.7%	40%	24%	–	–	18%

=== Cecil County ===
In Cecil County, voters elected the county executive as well as two seats on the county council, in Districts 1 and 5.

==== County executive ====
2024 Cecil County Executive election
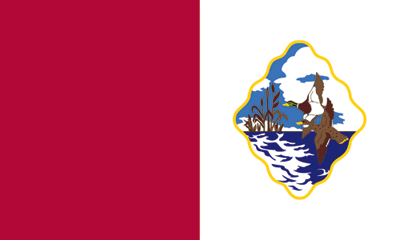
- November 5, 2024
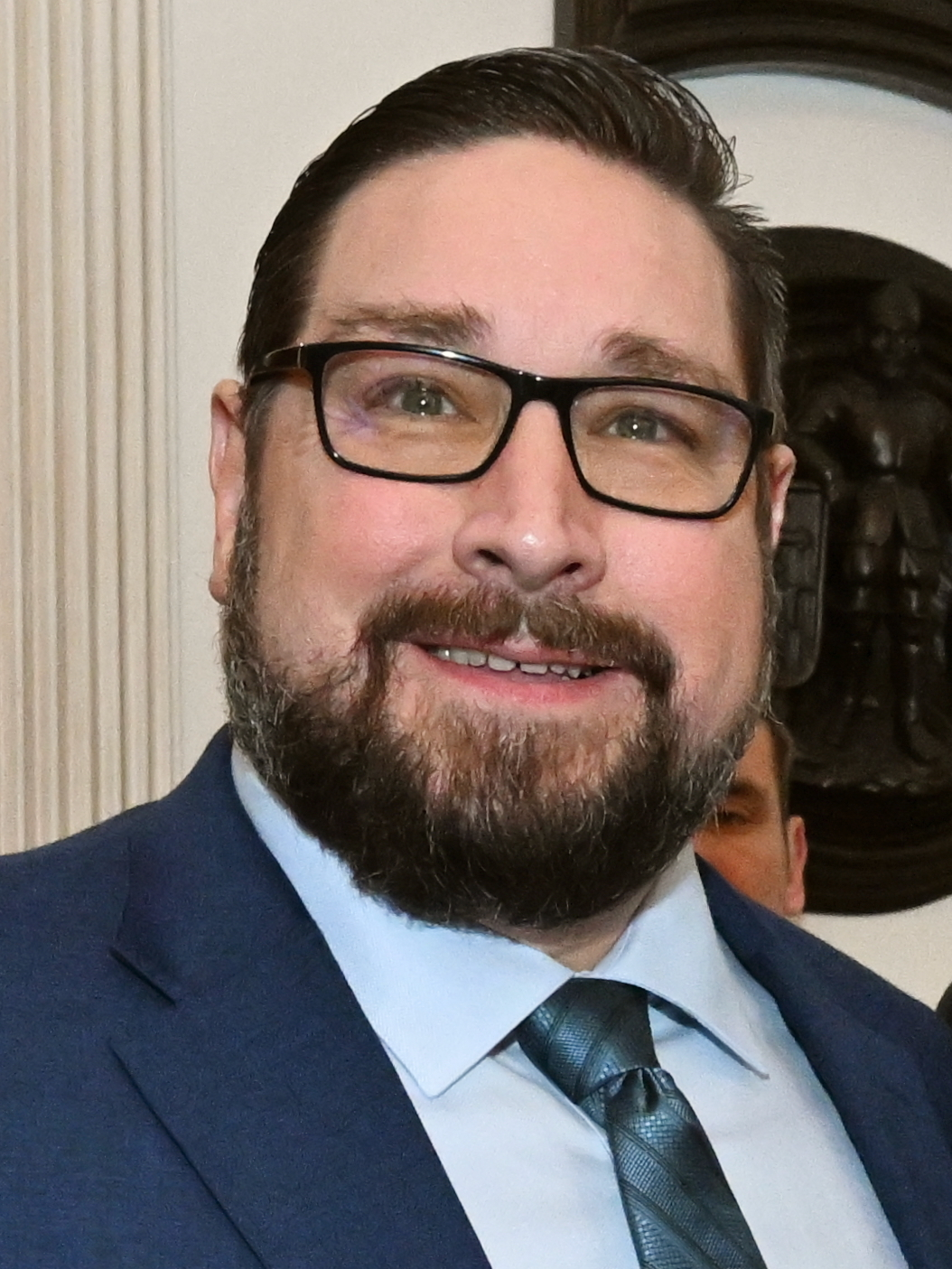

Nominee	Adam Streight	Bill Kilby
Party	Republican	Democratic
Popular vote	33,588	16,654
Percentage	66.38%	32.91%
- Streight: 50–60% 60–70% 70–80% Kilby: 50–60%
County Executive before election
Danielle Hornberger
Republican
Elected County Executive
Adam Streight
Republican

The incumbent county executive was Republican Danielle Hornberger, who was elected with 63.4% of the vote in 2020. She ran for a second term in 2024, but was defeated in the Republican primary election by Adam Streight.

===== Republican primary =====
====== Nominee ======
- Adam Streight, police sergeant and candidate for HD-35B in 2022

====== Eliminated in primary ======
- Danielle Hornberger, incumbent county executive

====== Results ======
Republican primary precinct results by margin of victory: Streight 0–5% 5–10% 10–15% 15–20% / Hornberger 0–5% 5–10% 10–15% 15–20% 20–25% 25–30%

Republican primary election
Party	Candidate	Votes	%
Republican	Adam Streight	7,445	53.24
Republican	Danielle Hornberger (incumbent)	6,538	46.76
Total votes		13,983	100.0

===== Democratic primary =====
====== Nominee ======
- Bill Kilby, dairy farmer

====== Results ======
Democratic primary election
Party	Candidate	Votes	%
Democratic	Bill Kilby	3,676	100.0
Total votes		3,676	100.0

===== General election =====
2024 Cecil County county executive election
Party	Candidate	Votes	%
Republican	Adam Streight	33,588	66.38%
Democratic	Bill Kilby	16,654	32.91%
Write-in		358	0.71%
Total votes		50,600	100.0

==== County council ====
District	Incumbent				Candidates
Location	Member	Party	First elected	Status	Candidates
1	Bob Meffley	Republican	2016	Incumbent re-elected	▌ ✓ Bob Meffley (Republican) 70.2%; ▌Michelle Ravert (Democratic) 29.6%; Republican primary: ▌ ✓ Bob Meffley (Republican); ▌Sandra Ward (Republican)
5	Jackie Gregory	Republican	2016	Incumbent lost renomination. Republican hold.	▌ ✓ Dawn Branch (Republican) 69.3%; ▌Russ Melrath (Democratic) 30.4%; Republican primary: ▌ ✓ Dawn Branch (Republican); ▌Jackie Gregory (Republican)

=== Hagerstown ===
==== Mayor ====
The 2024 Hagerstown mayoral election was held on November 5, 2024. Incumbent mayor Tekesha Martinez became the city's mayor and the city's first Black mayor on February 7, 2023, after Emily Keller resigned following Governor Wes Moore naming her to serve as Special Secretary of Opioid Response in his administration. On July 12, 2023, she announced that she would run for Congress in Maryland's 6th congressional district, opting against re-election as mayor.

===== Candidates =====
- Bill McIntire, business owner
- Stephen S. Schutte, broadband executive (withdrawn, still on ballot)

===== Results =====
Hagerstown mayoral election, 2024
Candidate	Votes	%
Bill McIntire	8,595	69.20
Stephen S. Schutte (withdrawn)	3,174	25.56
Write-in	651	5.24
Total votes	12,420	100.0

==== City council ====
Members of the Hagerstown City Council are elected in an at-large nonpartisan election, where the top ten candidates from the primary move on to the general election, and the top five candidates are elected.

===== Candidates =====
====== Advanced to general election ======
- Kristin Aleshire, incumbent city councilmember
- Caroline Anderson, business owner
- Erika Bell, business owner
- Mark Bell, business owner
- Tiara Burnett, incumbent city councilmember
- Sean Flaherty, data analyst
- Stacy Michael
- Rich Owens, therapist
- Peter Perini, incumbent city councilmember
- Matthew Schindler, incumbent city councilmember

====== Eliminated in primary ======
- Journie Martinez, poet

===== Primary election results =====
Hagerstown city council primary election, 2024
Candidate	Votes	%
Kristin Aleshire (incumbent)	2,617	16.12
Tiara Burnett (incumbent)	2,062	12.70
Matthew Schindler (incumbent)	1,660	10.22
Peter Perini (incumbent)	1,579	9.73
Sean Flaherty	1,453	8.95
Erika Bell	1,369	8.43
Stacy Michael	1,347	8.30
Caroline Anderson	1,252	7.71
Mark Bell	1,101	6.78
Rich Owens	1,074	6.61
Journie Martinez	722	4.45
Total votes	16,236	100.0

===== General election results =====
Hagerstown city council election, 2024
Candidate	Votes	%
Tiara Burnett (incumbent)	6,371	13.37
Kristin Aleshire (incumbent)	6,363	13.35
Erika Bell	5,412	11.36
Caroline Anderson	4,557	9.56
Sean Flaherty	4,394	9.22
Mark Bell	4,373	9.18
Matthew Schindler (incumbent)	4,199	8.81
Peter Perini (incumbent)	4,046	8.49
Stacy Michael	3,999	8.39
Rich Owens	3,719	7.80
Write-in	233	0.47
Total votes	47,656	100.0

=== Prince George's County ===
==== At-large district special election ====
2024 Prince George's County Council at-large special election
- November 5, 2024
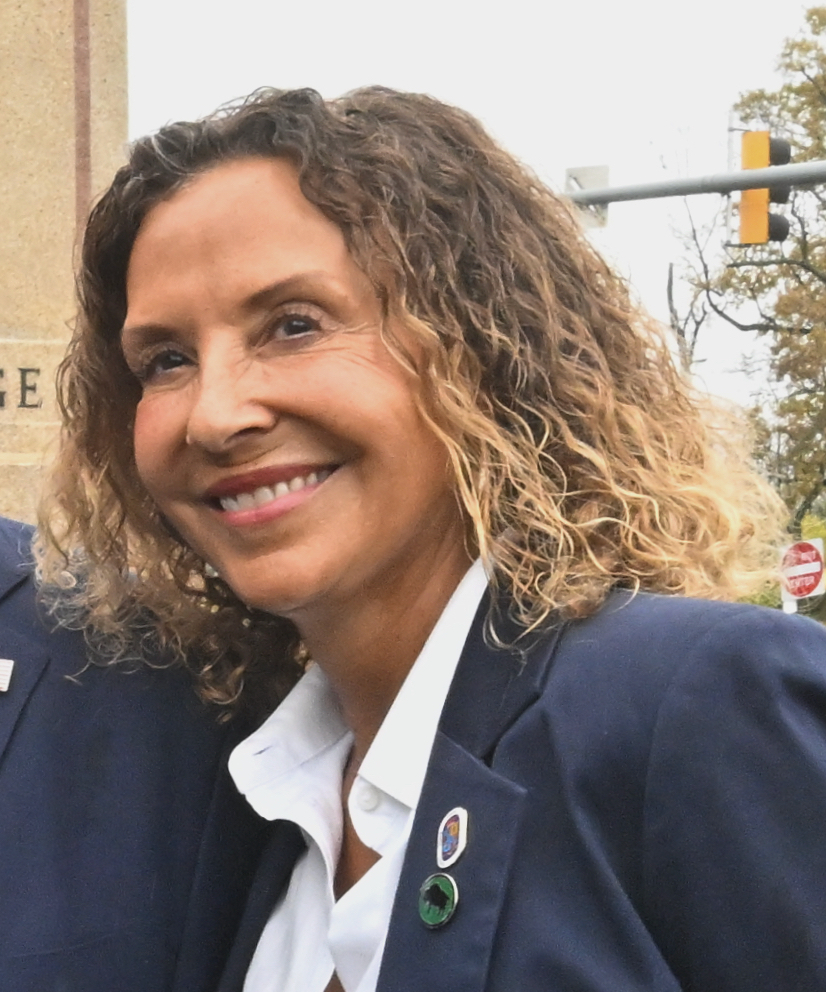

Nominee	Jolene Ivey	Michael Riker
Party	Democratic	Republican
Popular vote	332,406	45,547
Percentage	87.69%	12.01%
- Ivey: 50–60% 60–70% 70–80% 80–90% >90% Riker: 50–60%
Councilmember before election
Mel Franklin
Democratic
Elected Councilmember
Jolene Ivey
Democratic

On June 17, 2024, Prince George's County council member Mel Franklin resigned from his at-large seat on the county council. On June 25, the Prince George's County Council unanimously voted to hold a special primary election on August 6, 2024, and a special general election to be held on November 5, 2024. County council president Jolene Ivey and retired police officer Michael Riker won the Democratic and Republican primaries, respectively, and faced off in the general election.

===== Democratic primary =====
====== Candidates ======
Nominee

- Jolene Ivey, president of the Prince George's County Council (2023–present) from the fifth district (2018–present)

Eliminated in primary

- Tim Adams, mayor of Bowie (2019–present) and candidate for comptroller of Maryland in 2022
- Angela Angel, former state delegate from the 25th district (2015–2019) and candidate for MD-04 in 2022
- Tamara Davis Brown, attorney and candidate for SD-26 in 2022
- Leo Bachi Eyomobo, at-large candidate for the Prince George's County Council in 2022
- Marvin E. Holmes Jr., state delegate from district 23B (2003–present)
- Judy Mickens-Murray, former member of the Prince George's County Board of Education (2021–2024)
- Gabriel Njinimbot, paralegal, entrepreneur, and candidate for MD-04 in 2024

Withdrawn

- Wala Blegay, Prince George's County councilmember from the sixth district (2022–present) (endorsed Adams)
- Mahasin El Amin, Prince George's County clerk of the Circuit Court (2018–present)
- Kiesha D. Lewis, whistleblower (remained on ballot)

====== Results ======
Democratic primary results
Party	Candidate	Votes	%
Democratic	Jolene Ivey	29,698	47.54
Democratic	Tim Adams	19,061	30.51
Democratic	Tamara Davis Brown	5,723	9.16
Democratic	Angela Angel	3,371	5.40
Democratic	Marvin E. Holmes Jr.	1,473	2.36
Democratic	Gabriel Njinimbot	1,176	1.88
Democratic	Kiesha D. Lewis (withdrawn)	859	1.38
Democratic	Judy Mickens-Murray	688	1.10
Democratic	Leo Bachi Eyomobo	416	0.67
Total votes		62,465	100.00

===== Republican primary =====
====== Candidates ======
Nominee

- Michael Riker, retired police officer

Eliminated in primary

- Kamita Gray, environmental activist
- Isaac Toyos, federal legislative affairs analyst
- Jonathan White, veteran and Democratic candidate for the at-large Prince George's County Council seat in 2022

====== Results ======
Republican primary results
Party	Candidate	Votes	%
Republican	Michael Riker	1,235	45.07
Republican	Jonathan White	850	31.02
Republican	Kamita Gray	330	12.04
Republican	Isaac Toyos	325	11.86
Total votes		2,740	100.00

===== General election =====
====== Results ======
General election results
Party	Candidate	Votes	%
Democratic	Jolene Ivey	332,406	87.69%
Republican	Michael Riker	45,547	12.01%
Write-in		1,136	0.30%
Total votes		379,089	100.00%

=== Ballot propositions ===
Baltimore Question H results by precinct Opposition: 50–60%; 60–70%; 70–80%; 80–90%; Support: 50–60%; 60–70%; Tie 50% No data

Several local ballot initiatives were voted on during the 2024 general election. Some notable ones included:

- In Baltimore, voters:
  - Rejected Question H, a ballot initiative to decrease the size of the Baltimore City Council from fourteen to eight members. This ballot initiative was funded by David D. Smith, the executive chairman of Sinclair Broadcast Group.
  - Approved Question F, which made zoning law changes needed for a $500 million renovation of Harborplace.
- In Baltimore County, voters approved a referendum to expand the Baltimore County Council from seven to nine members.
- In Charles County, voters rejected a referendum to change the county from a home rule form of government to a charter government, which would have established a county executive and county council.
- In Howard County, voters approved a referendum to decide establish the inspector general's office.
- In Montgomery County, voters approved a ballot initiative to reduce term limits for the county executive from three to two terms, barring Montgomery County Executive Marc Elrich from running for a third term. This ballot initiative was funded by Reardon Sullivan, the former chair of the Montgomery County Republican Party.
- In Wicomico County, voters rejected a referendum to restore the county to a council–manager government, which would have abolished the office of the county executive effective 2026.

== See also ==
- Political party strength in Maryland
- Elections in Maryland

== Notes ==
Partisan clients
