= Brooke Grossman =

American politician (born 1978)

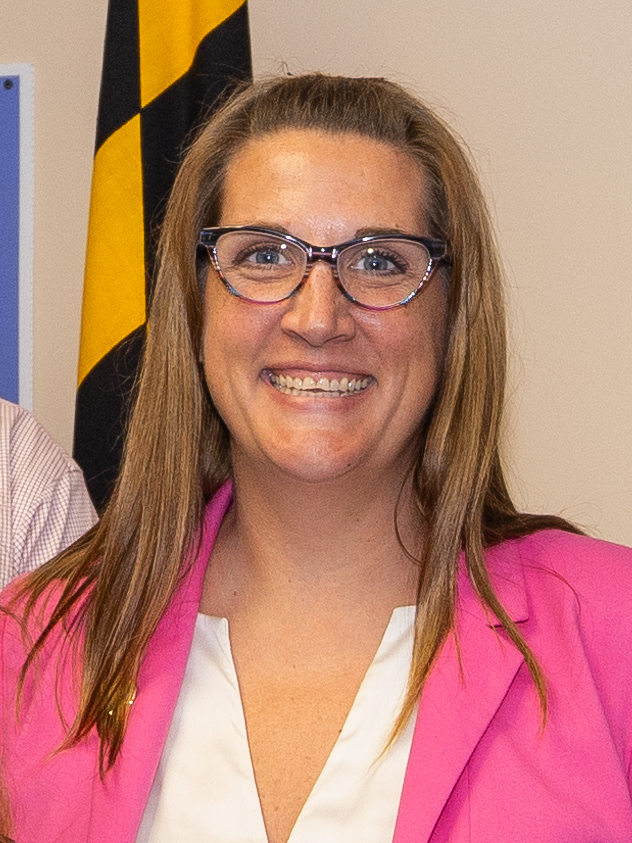
- Grossman in 2023

Member of the Maryland House of Delegates from the 2B district
- In office January 11, 2023 – December 13, 2024
- Preceded by: Brenda J. Thiam
- Succeeded by: Matthew Schindler

Personal details
- Born: September 25, 1978 (age 48) Clinton Township, Macomb County, Michigan, U.S.
- Party: Democratic
- Children: 6
- Education: Kaplan University (BS)

Brooke Grossman (born September 25, 1978) is an American politician who was a member for the Maryland House of Delegates in District 2B in Washington County from 2023 to 2024.

== Early life ==
Grossman was born on September 25, 1978, in Clinton Township, Macomb County, Michigan. She graduated from Brunswick High School and attended Kaplan University, where she earned a B.S. degree in human service administration in 2016.

== Career ==
Grossman currently works as the chief mission officer for Horizon Goodwill Industries and chairs the county's homeless coalition.

In May 2018, the Washington County Board of Commissioners appointed Grossman to a three-year term as a citizen at-large representative to its Emergency Services Advisory Council.

In 2020, Grossman unsuccessfully ran for in the Hagerstown City Council, placing seventh with 8.7 percent of the vote.

In 2022, Grossman ran for the Maryland House of Delegates in District 2B, challenging incumbent state delegate Brenda J. Thiam. She won the Democratic primary on July 19, 2022, receiving 61.3 percent of the vote, and later defeated Thiam in the general election on November 8.

== In the legislature ==
Grossman was sworn into the Maryland House of Delegates on January 11, 2023. She is a member of the House Ways and Means Committee. In November 2024, Grossman said that she would resign from the House of Delegates on December 13, 2024, after she and her family moved out of the district.

== Political positions ==
In January 2022, Grossman requested that the Washington County Board of Commissioners provide $10,000 in funding from the American Rescue Plan Act of 2021 to help with the costs of quarantining COVID-19 positive homeless people. The motion for the request was approved 4-0 by the Board of Commissioners.

In February 2022, Grossman criticized a petition released by state delegate Brenda J. Thiam against the newly drawn legislative redistricting maps.

In May 2022, Grossman signed a Chesapeake Climate Action Network resolution to move Maryland to 100 percent carbon-free electricity by 2035 and to remove trash incineration from the state's "clean energy" classification.

== Personal life ==
Grossman is married with six children.

== Electoral history ==
Hagerstown City Council election, 2020
Candidate	Votes	%
Tiara Burnett	6,840	13.6
Kristin B. Aleshire	6,178	12.5
Tekesha Martinez	5,601	11.3
Shelley McIntire	5,380	10.8
Bob Bruchey	4,770	9.6
Peter E. Perini, Sr.	4,717	9.5
Brooke Grossman	4,293	8.7
Penny May Nigh	4,024	8.1
Austin Heffernan	3,817	7.7
Brenda J. Thiam	3,772	7.6
Write-in	202	0.4

Maryland House of Delegates District 2B Democratic primary election, 2022
Party	Candidate	Votes	%
Democratic	Brooke Grossman	1,167	61.3
Democratic	Ladetra Robinson	738	38.7

Maryland House of Delegates District 2B general election, 2022
Party	Candidate	Votes	%
Democratic	Brooke Grossman	5,001	54.15
Republican	Brenda J. Thiam (incumbent)	4,222	45.72
Write-in		12	0.13
