= April McClain Delaney =

American politician (born 1964)

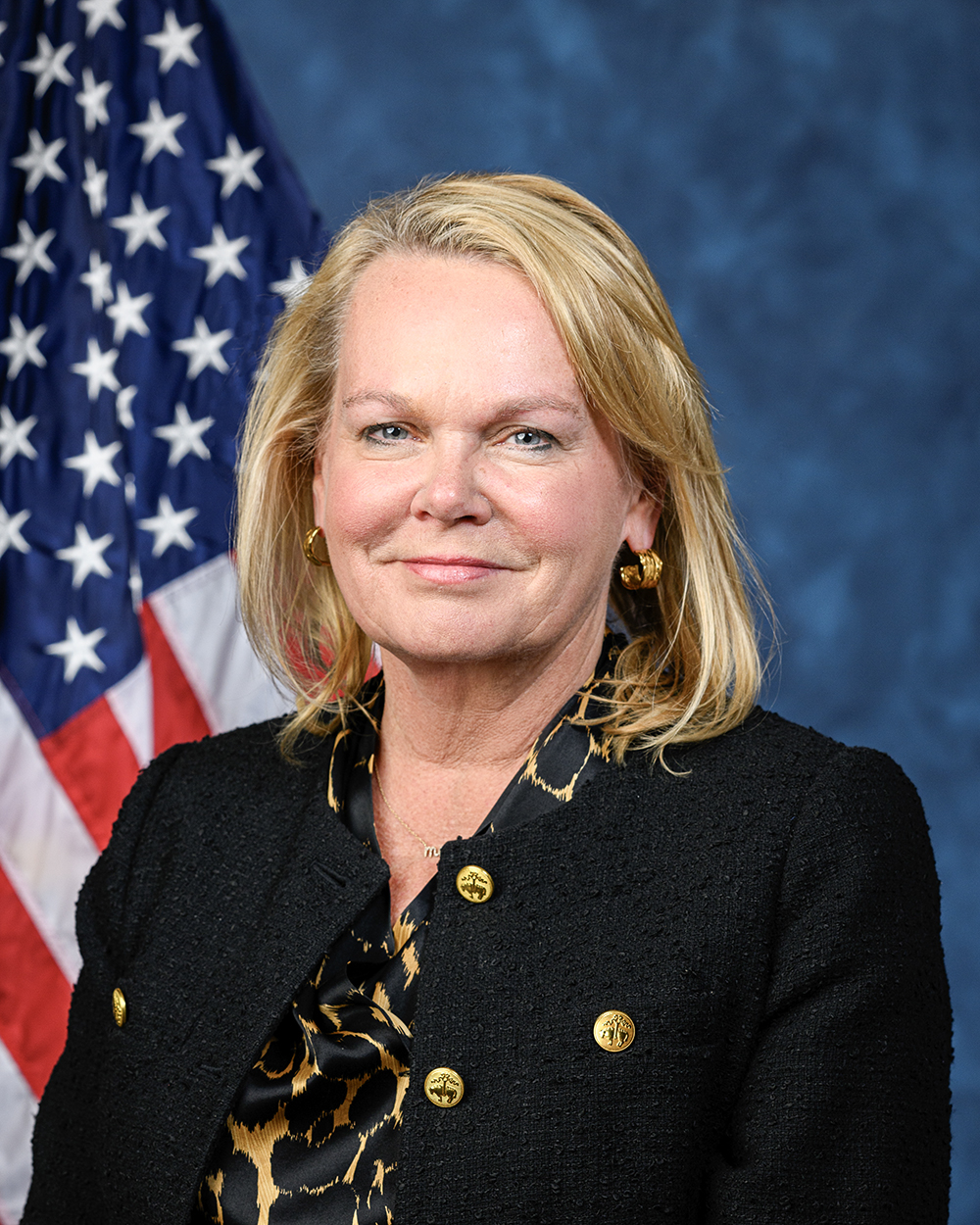
- Official portrait, 2024

Member of the U.S. House of Representatives from Maryland's 6th district
- Incumbent
- Assumed office January 3, 2025
- Preceded by: David Trone

Personal details
- Born: April Lynn McClain; May 28, 1964 (age 62) Buhl, Idaho, U.S.
- Party: Democratic
- Spouse: John Delaney (m. 1989)
- Children: 4
- Education: Northwestern University (BS); Georgetown University (JD)
- Website: House website Campaign website
- McClain Delaney's voice McClain Delaney on actions against the federal government by the Department of Government Efficiency. Recorded February 5, 2025

April Lynn McClain Delaney (née McClain; born May 28, 1964) is an American lawyer and politician who is a member of the U.S. House of Representatives representing Maryland's 6th congressional district since 2025. She previously served as the deputy administrator of the National Telecommunications and Information Administration from 2022 to 2023.

A member of the Democratic Party, in 2024 McClain Delaney won the U.S. House of Representatives election in Maryland's 6th congressional district after prevailing in a crowded primary and going on to win the general election. She is the wife of former Congressman John Delaney, who represented the 6th district from 2013 to 2019.

== Early life and education ==
April McClain was born in Buhl, Idaho, on May 28, 1964, to father Thomas McClain, a potato farmer, and mother Laurel McClain. She graduated from Buhl High School in 1982. After accompanying her father on a business trip to Chicago and visiting Northwestern University, she would later attend the school on a scholarship, graduating in 1986 with a Bachelor of Science degree in communications. She is a member of the Kappa Kappa Gamma sorority and the Northwestern Alumni Association and has returned to the university for volunteer work. She later earned a Juris Doctor from the Georgetown University Law Center in 1989. She and her husband, whom she met at the university, founded the Delaney Post-Graduate Residency Program to help graduate students enter private practice.

== Legal career ==
McClain Delaney practiced as a media lawyer for much of her career. In 2006, she founded the Washington, D.C. division of Common Sense Media, a nonprofit advocacy group focusing on the effects of online and televised media on children, serving as the division director. She was appointed by president Joe Biden in January 2022 to the Department of Commerce, serving as the deputy administrator of the National Telecommunications and Information Administration until her resignation in September 2023.

While John was a member of Congress, McClain Delaney served as the chair of the Congressional Club's First Lady Luncheon and was a co-chairwoman for the National Prayer Breakfast. She also played an unusually active role in her husband's 2020 presidential campaign, during which she criticized the role of social media in the Democratic primaries, saying that the platforms' focus on the divisive political climate limited Delaney's centrist message.

== U.S. House of Representatives ==
=== Elections ===
==== 2024 ====
===== Primary =====
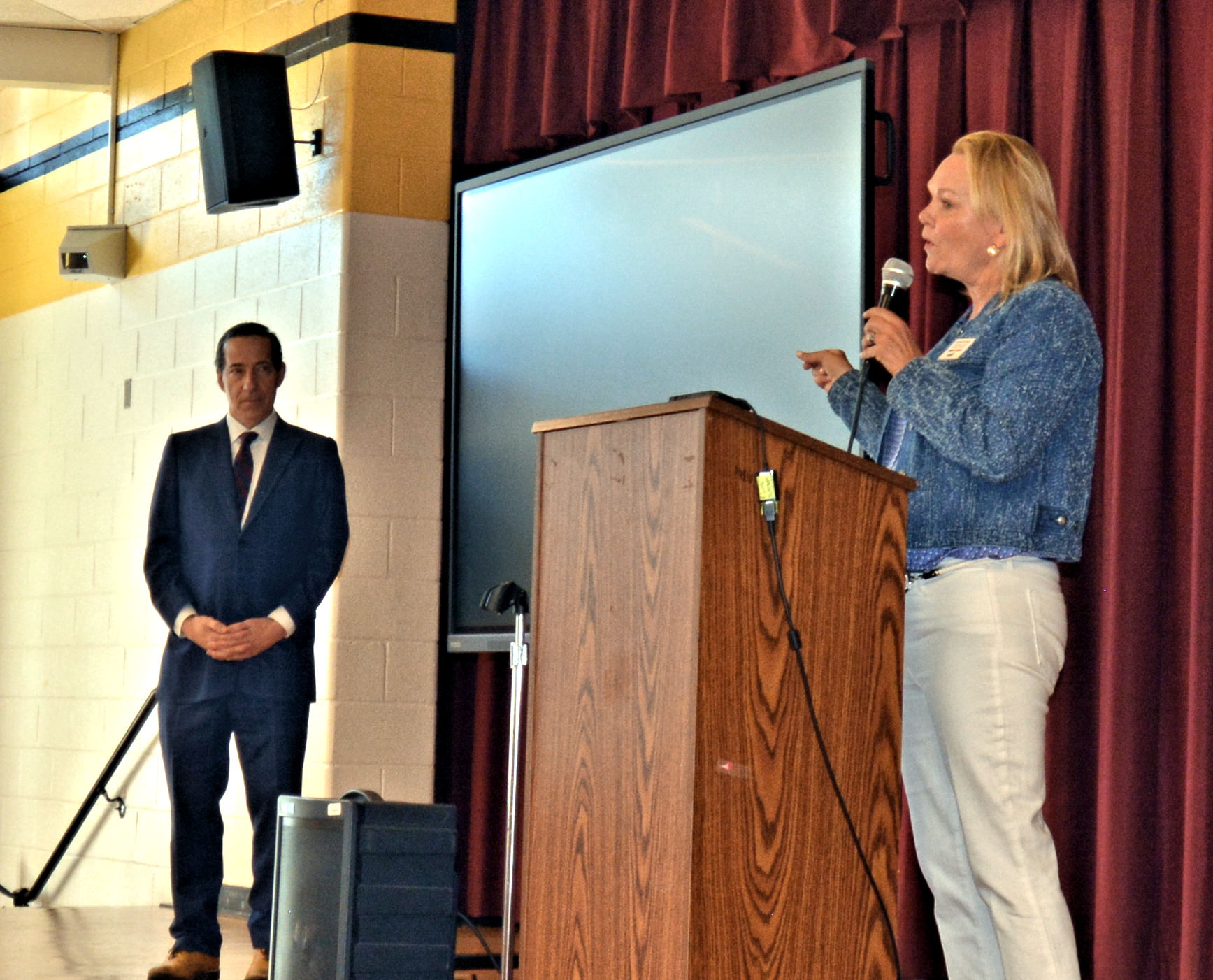
McClain Delaney campaigning with Congressman Jamie Raskin, 2024

In September 2023, MoCo360 reported that McClain Delaney would be resigning from the NTIA to run for Congress in Maryland's 6th congressional district, succeeding incumbent David Trone, who retired from his seat to run for the U.S. Senate. The district was represented by her husband from 2013 to 2019, until he chose to retire to focus on his 2020 presidential campaign.

McClain Delaney officially announced her candidacy on October 25, 2023. She joined a primary field that would ultimately consist of 16 candidates, including other elected and appointed officials. She campaigned on being a bipartisan problem solver who would fight "corrosive division" and partisan gridlock if elected. She led the field in fundraising, raising over $2 million including more than $1 million in self-funding. She was endorsed by Speaker of the House Nancy Pelosi, Maryland Reps. Steny Hoyer, Jamie Raskin, and Dutch Ruppersberger, as well as the United Auto Workers labor union and The Washington Post.

McClain Delaney prevailed in the May 14 primary election, winning over 40 percent of the vote in a 16 candidate field.

===== General election =====
Her opponent for the November 5 general election was Republican Neil Parrott, a former state delegate who was making his third run for the seat. The election for the 6th district was expected to be the most competitive in the state. In the general election, McClain Delaney highlighted her experience in the U.S. Department of Commerce and criticized Parrott's stances on abortion, antisemitism, and LGBTQ issues. She continued to self-fund her campaign in the general election, loaning her campaign an additional $1.998 million and outspending Parrott 5-to-1.

On November 8, 2024, CNN declared McClain Delaney the winner of the 6th district election, narrowly defeating Parrott. She and Sarah Elfreth are the first women to represent Maryland in the U.S. House of Representatives since 2016.

==== 2026 ====
On October 30, 2025, McClain Delaney announced that she would run for re-election to a second term. During the Democratic primary, she self-funded her campaign $11 million and faced a primary challenge from her predecessor, David Trone, whom she criticized for repeatedly voting to fund U.S. Immigration and Customs Enforcement during his tenure in Congress. In April 2026, McClain-Delaney issued a cease-and-desist order against Trone's campaign for using the terms "re-elect" in his campaign literature, combined with his use of the title "Congressman", which she said was an attempt to deceive voters into believing that he was still incumbent. McClain Delaney defeated Trone in the Democratic primary election on June 23, 2026, and faced perennial candidate Robin Ficker in the general election, which she also won.

=== Tenure ===
McClain Delaney was sworn in on January 3, 2025. Before the 119th Congress, McClain Delaney unsuccessfully ran for freshman class president, losing to Arizona freshman U.S. Representative Yassamin Ansari, who was elected 23–10.

In November 2025, McClain Delaney introduced the American Farmers Act, which would redirect $20 billion that the Trump administration planned to use to stabilize the Argentine peso toward U.S. farmers.

=== Committee assignments ===
During the 119th Congress, McClain Delaney serves on the following committees:

- Committee on Agriculture
  - Subcommittee on Conservation, Research, and Biotechnology
  - Subcommittee on Commodity Markets, Digital Assets, and Rural Development
- Committee on Science, Space, and Technology
  - Subcommittee on Research and Technology

=== Caucus memberships ===
- Congressional Caucus for Women's Issues
- Congressional Equality Caucus
- Labor Caucus
- New Democrat Coalition

== Political positions ==
Shannon Bream of Fox News described McClain Delaney as a centrist Democrat.

=== Crime and policing ===
McClain Delaney supports providing additional funding to "effective and accountable policing policies" and officer training, and encouraging community policing. She said she wished to "address some of the root causes of crime by tackling the mental health crisis, investing in prevention solutions, and keeping dangerous weapons off our streets and out of the wrong hands".

In July 2025, after President Donald Trump said that he wanted the new Federal Bureau of Investigation (FBI) headquarters to be the Ronald Reagan Building and International Trade Center in Washington, D.C., overturning a 2023 General Services Administration decision selecting Greenbelt, Maryland, as the location for the FBI's new headquarters, McClain Delaney signed onto a letter saying that she and other Maryland lawmakers would "be fighting back against this proposal with every tool we have".

=== Education ===
McClain Delaney supports the Blueprint for Maryland's Future, universal pre-kindergarten, free community college, and expanding skills training programs in schools. She also supports having the federal government work with state colleges to establish workforce development to bring down the cost of higher education, and working with students to fight against predatory student loans.

=== Environment ===
McClain Delaney supports increasing funding for the Environmental Protection Agency and climate science research, as well as providing tax incentives for investments in decarbonization technologies. She also supports efforts to transition the United States to a green economy and electric vehicles.

=== Fiscal issues ===
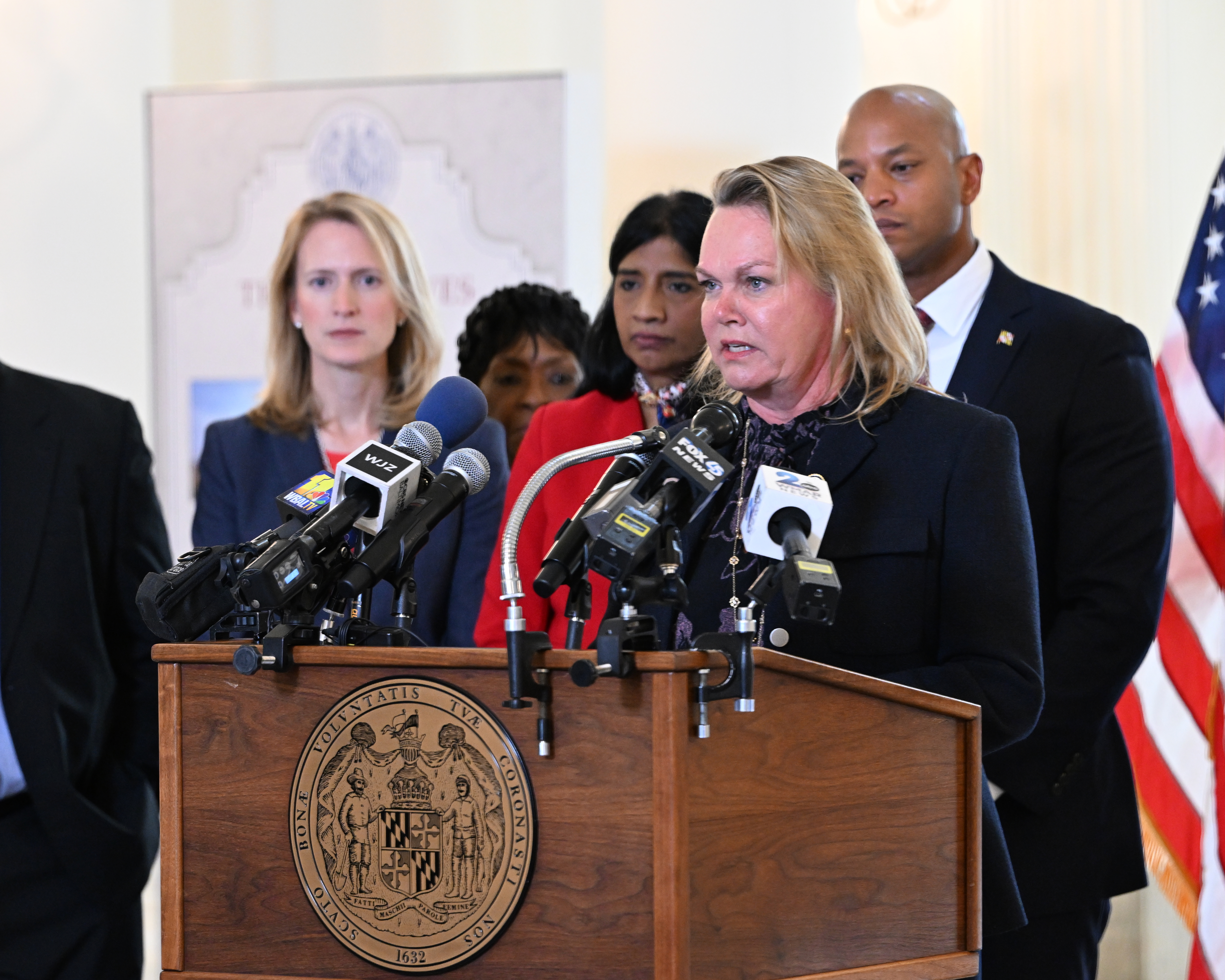
McClain Delaney speaks against the 2025 United States federal government shutdown.

McClain Delaney supports deregulation for small businesses. She also supports cutting regulations for affordable housing construction, and using antitrust laws to foster competition between grocery companies. McClain Delaney has blamed both Democrats and Republicans for increases to the national debt of the United States and expressed support for deficit reduction through strategic budget cuts, waste elimination, and reforms to Social Security, Medicare, and Medicaid.

McClain Delaney opposed efforts by the Trump administration and the Department of Government Efficiency (DOGE) to cut federal spending and fire tens of thousands of federal workers, describing the actions taken by Trump and DOGE administrator Elon Musk as "lawless" and encouraging federal workers affected by layoffs to contact her office for resources. In August 2025, she wrote a letter to U.S. Secretary of Agriculture Brooke Rollins calling for an investigation into "DOGE's interference" at the Farm Service Agency, citing an NPR report that DOGE representatives accessed a sensitive agency-run database that controls government loans and payments to farmers and ranchers.

In October 2025, McClain Delaney opposed the 2025 United States federal government shutdown, expressing concerns about its impacts on federal workers and calling on Trump to end the shutdown. During the shutdown, she donated her congressional pay to local nonprofits affected by cuts to the Supplemental Nutrition Assistance Program (SNAP) and supported a bill to double funding for The Emergency Food Assistance Program. In November 2025, McClain Delaney said she would vote against the bipartisan Senate agreement to end the shutdown.

=== Foreign policy ===
McClain Delaney supports strengthening NATO, promoting U.S. economic interests abroad, and leading on issues like climate change to counter foreign policy challenges from China, Russia, and the Middle East.

==== Iran ====
In June 2025, after the American strikes on Iranian nuclear sites, McClain Delaney said that she was thankful that the strikes were successful as she believed a "nuclear-enabled Iran" would pose a "grave risk to American and global security", but expressed concerns with presidents' use of the Authorization for Use of Military Force of 2001 to conduct military strikes without congressional approval. In February 2026, she criticized further U.S. and Israeli strikes against Iran, saying that Trump "has not made his case to Congress or to the American people explaining why this action is justified and the consequences" and that Congress must reassert its constitutional authority to declare war.

==== Israel ====
In October 2023, amid the Hamas-led attack on Israel earlier that month, McClain Delaney expressed support for Israel and its right to defend itself, supported a letter calling on Egypt to create humanitarian zones in the Gaza Strip, and urged Congress to pass legislation providing additional humanitarian aid and assistance to Israeli missile defense systems. She also condemned anti-Israel rhetorics on college campuses and supported calls by New York Attorney General Letitia James for increased moderation on social media platforms to remove hate speech and propaganda associated with the Hamas attacks. McClain Delaney said she was sympathetic to the loss of civilian lives in Gaza, Israel, and Lebanon, but opposes calls for an immediate ceasefire in the Gaza war and conditioning U.S. military aid to Israel. She also condemned pro-Palestinian protests on university campuses and called on university presidents, law enforcement, and political leaders to protect Jewish students attending schools with ongoing protests.

In January 2025, McClain Delaney was one of 45 Democrats to vote for a bill to place sanctions on the International Criminal Court for issuing arrest warrants against Benjamin Netanyahu and former Israeli Defense Minister Yoav Gallant. Following the vote, she signed onto a letter to the president of the ICC calling on the court to rescind its arrest warrants against Israeli leaders.

During the Congressional summer recess of 2025, McClain Delaney was supposed to attend an AIPAC-sponsored trip to Israel, but decided not to go because she would've arrived after other attending lawmakers.

==== Russia ====
In September 2026, McClain Delaney voted against the Sanctioning Russia Act, citing potential rising costs for Americans resulting from the tariffs.

==== Ukraine ====
McClain Delaney supports providing aid to Ukraine in the Russo-Ukrainian War. In February 2025, she criticized comments made by President Donald Trump blaming Ukraine for Russia's invasion and calling Ukrainian President Volodymyr Zelenskyy a dictator, saying that his comments were insulting to soldiers and civilians who lost their lives in the war.

==== Venezuela ====
In January 2026, McClain Delaney criticized U.S. military strikes in Venezuela, calling it "deeply troubling and illegal". She later called on House Democrats to consider impeachment proceedings against President Donald Trump in response to the strikes.

=== Gun policy ===
During her 2024 congressional campaign, McClain Delaney supported "common sense gun legislation" such as universal background checks, assault weapon bans, and red flag laws.

=== Healthcare ===
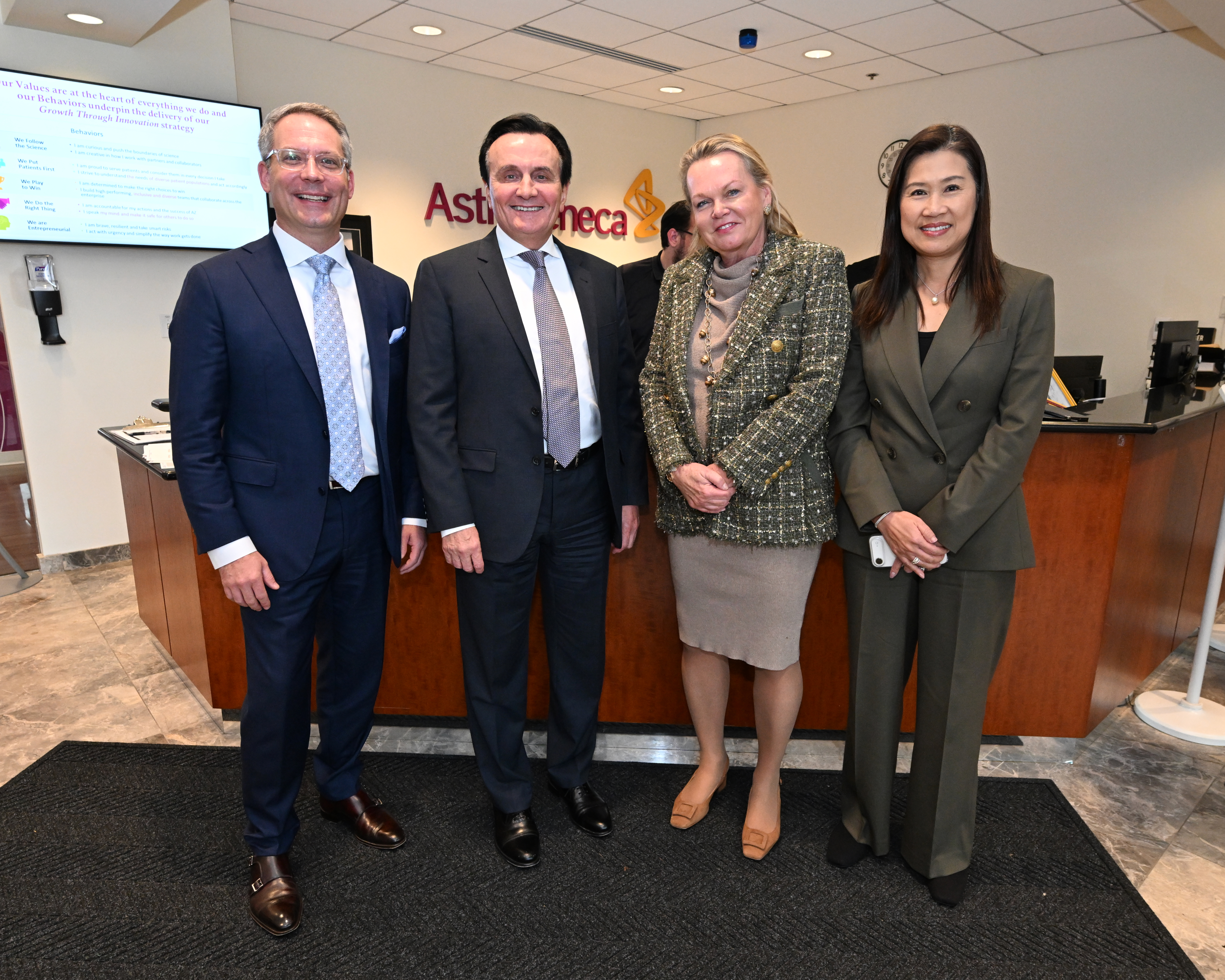
McClain Delaney with AstraZeneca CEO Pascal Soriot

During her 2024 congressional campaign, McClain Delaney signed onto a Maryland Healthcare for All pledge to support legislation to extend Inflation Reduction Act-provided healthcare benefits beyond 2025 and supported providing additional assistance to people with healthcare subsidies. She also supports allowing Medicare to negotiate prescription drug prices and establishing a federal universal healthcare coverage program, but stopped short of calling for Medicare for All. In July 2025, McClain Delaney opposed provisions in the One Big Beautiful Bill Act to reduce spending for Medicaid and the Supplemental Nutrition Assistance Program (SNAP), saying that an estimated 32,000 people in her district would lose health coverage and predicting that the bill would hit rural communities across the nation the hardest.

=== Immigration ===
During her 2024 congressional campaign, McClain Delaney supported the Bipartisan Border Security Bill negotiated by Senators James Lankford and Kyrsten Sinema and blamed former President Donald Trump for its failure to pass the Senate. She also supports streamlining the process to grant asylum and to supporting immigrants already living in the United States, and using new technologies to help secure the Mexico–United States border.

In January 2025, McClain Delaney was one of 48 Democrats, and the only Maryland Democrat, to vote for the Laken Riley Act, which requires U.S. Immigration and Customs Enforcement (ICE) to detain undocumented immigrants charged with theft. She later became one of 46 House Democrats who joined all Republicans to vote for a Senate-amended version of the bill. In December 2025, McClain Delaney told The Baltimore Banner that she regretted her vote for the Laken Riley Act, saying that she did not envision the Trump administration sending armed, masked men to American cities to arrest undocumented people and was not "totally focused as much as I should have" on a provision that required federal law enforcement to detain undocumented immigrants accused, but not convicted, of certain crimes.

In June 2025, McClain Delaney voted for a resolution condemning the 2025 Boulder fire attack, which contained language expressing support for ICE personnel. When criticized for supporting this resolution during a No Kings protest in Frederick, Maryland, she said that she would "stand up to ICE" but said that she supported deporting people who are in the U.S. illegally and have shown terrorist intent. In late May 2026, McClain Delaney defended her vote for the resolution, telling Bethesda Magazine, "I'm sorry, I don't care who you are–if you are helping rescue people maimed by a Molotov cocktail, you get your gratitude".

In January 2026, McClain Delaney condemned reports by The Washington Post that federal officials were looking into establishing a new immigrant detention processing center in the Hagerstown area, promising to fight any such facility "with every tool available to me". That same month, she supported an effort to impeach U.S. Homeland Security Secretary Kristi Noem. In February 2026, after footage from inside the Baltimore ICE detention facility went viral on social media, McClain Delaney toured the ICE facility, afterwards describing "deeply disturbing" conditions in the facility that included a lack of access to food and water, and signed onto a letter to Noem and ICE director Todd Lyons expressing concerns with conditions at the facility. In March 2026, she testified in support of a bill in the Maryland General Assembly that would ban detention centers in any building not specifically designed for that purpose.

In September 2026, following a violent ICE confrontation with protesters in Frederick, McClain Delaney expressed concerns with ICE agents' use of force against city residents and called for a "full, transparent investigation" into the incident.

=== Social issues ===
During John Delaney's 2020 presidential campaign, McClain Delaney said that she would support updating communication legislation to protect kids' privacy.

During her 2024 congressional campaign, McClain Delaney supported efforts to codify the Roe v. Wade decision, including the Women's Health Protection Act. She also supported the Equality Act and opposed efforts to ban gender-affirming care.

In October 2024, McClain Delaney said she supported requiring states to use independent redistricting commissions to draw their congressional districts. In November 2025, she supported the Governor's Redistricting Advisory Commission, a commission established by Governor Wes Moore to explore mid-decade redistricting in Maryland in response to Republican mid-decade redistricting efforts in various red states, saying that Democrats "can't have one hand tied behind our back when the GOP across the board is trying to play dirty and undermine our democracy".

In May 2026, McClain Delaney told Bethesda Magazine that she was "not for term limits per se", believing that Congress should focus on other aspects of the electoral process such as campaign finance reform.

=== Transportation ===
McClain Delaney supports the expansion of Interstate 270 and Interstate 81, increasing public transportation, as well as improving safety on U.S. Route 15.

== Personal life ==
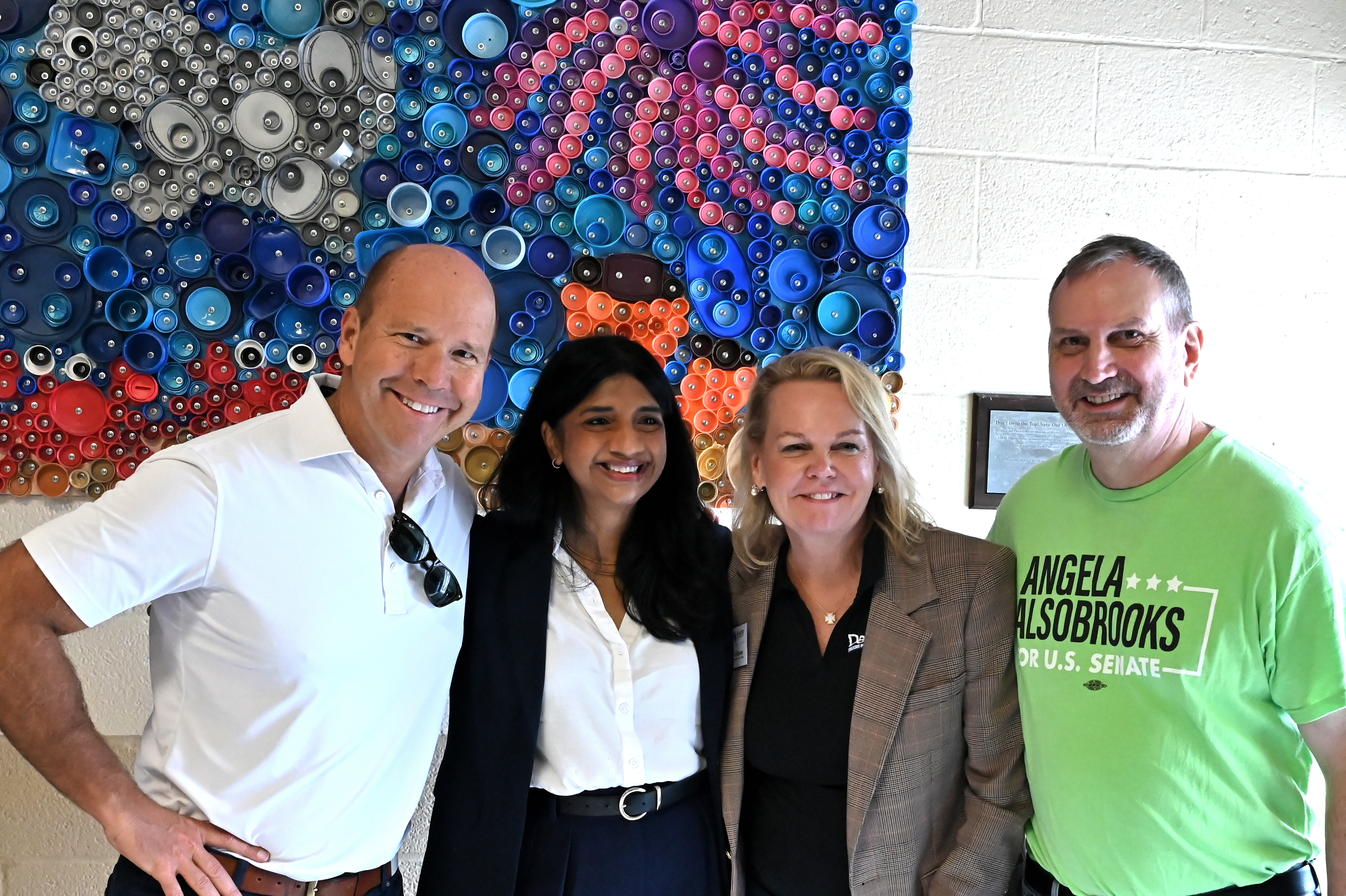
The Delaneys with Maryland lieutenant governor Aruna Miller and her husband, 2024

McClain Delaney is the wife of John Delaney, a former U.S. Representative from Maryland and candidate for president in 2020. They met while studying at Georgetown University and married in Sun Valley, Idaho, shortly after graduating. They have four daughters–Summer, Brooke, Lily, and Grace–and live in Potomac, Maryland. The Delaneys attend the Little Flower Catholic Church in Bethesda, Maryland.

In July 2025, The Baltimore Sun described McClain Delaney as the wealthiest member of Maryland's congressional delegation, with her disclosure forms including three joint investments worth $5 million to $25 million and bank stock in Forbright, Inc., a holding company founded by her husband valued at $25 million to $50 million. While in Congress, she did not buy or sell stocks, instead assigning a third party discretion to make trades on her behalf. In June 2026, McClain Delaney told Bethesda Magazine that her personal net worth was close to $100 million, but added that she and her husband have additional non-liquid assets.

== Electoral history ==
Maryland's 6th congressional district Democratic primary results, 2024
Party	Candidate	Votes	%
Democratic	April McClain Delaney	22,985	40.4
Democratic	Joe Vogel	14,940	26.3
Democratic	Ashwani Jain	4,750	8.3
Democratic	Tekesha Martinez	3,992	7.0
Democratic	Lesley Lopez	2,600	4.6
Democratic	Laurie-Anne Sayles	1,845	3.2
Democratic	Destiny Drake West	1,086	1.9
Democratic	Mohammad Mozumder	1,005	1.7
Democratic	Joel Martin Rubin (withdrawn)	820	1.4
Democratic	Peter Choharis (withdrawn)	818	1.4
Democratic	Geoffrey Grammer (withdrawn)	651	1.1
Democratic	George Gluck	437	0.8
Democratic	Kiambo White	401	0.7
Democratic	Stephen McDow (withdrawn)	246	0.4
Democratic	Altimont Wilks	179	0.3
Democratic	Adrian Petrus	166	0.3
Total votes		56,921	100.0

Maryland's 6th congressional district election, 2024
Party	Candidate	Votes	%	±%
Democratic	April McClain Delaney	199,788	53.05%	−1.67%
Republican	Neil Parrott	175,974	46.72%	+1.57%
Write-in		862	0.23%	+0.10%
Total votes		376,624	100.00%	

U.S. House of Representatives
Preceded by David Trone	Member of the U.S. House of Representatives from Maryland's 6th congressional district 2025–present	Incumbent
U.S. order of precedence (ceremonial)
Preceded by Sarah McBride	United States representatives by seniority 400th	Succeeded by Kristen McDonald Rivet
