= J. Charles Smith III =

American lawyer

J. Charles Smith

State's Attorney, Frederick County
- Incumbent
- Assumed office January 2, 2007

Personal details
- Born: September 17, 1964 (age 62) Baltimore, Maryland
- Party: Republican
- Spouse: Desiree Marie Smith
- Children: 4
- Education: University of Maryland, College Park, B.S. (1986); University of Baltimore School of Law, J.D. (1990)
- Occupation: Prosecutor
- Website: https://statesattorneysmith.com/
- Nickname: Charlie

J. Charles Smith (born September 17, 1964) is an American prosecutor in Frederick County, Maryland. He has been the lead State's Attorney for Frederick County since 2007.

== Early life and education ==
Smith was born in Baltimore, Maryland. He attended the University of Maryland, College Park, receiving a Bachelor of Science in finance in 1986. He received a juris doctor from the University of Baltimore School of Law in 1990.

== Career ==
Smith was admitted to the Maryland State Bar Association in 1990 and began practicing as an Assistant State's Attorney in Baltimore. In 1992, Smith began working in private practice as the principal attorney at Smith & Smith, P.C. In 1998, he became the Deputy State's Attorney for Frederick County. In 2003, Smith was awarded the Prosecutor of the Year award for Frederick County. Smith was elected as the State's Attorney for Frederick County, Maryland in 2006 and began his first term on January 2, 2007. Smith was a founding member of the Maryland Internet Crimes Against Children Task Force.

In 2016, Smith applied for a judgeship with the Circuit Court of Frederick County when G. Edward Dwyer Jr. retired. Smith did not make the final list of nominations. The position ultimately went to another candidate, Richard J. Sandy.

== Personal life ==
Smith is married to Desiree Marie Smith, a Special Agent in the Federal Bureau of Investigation. They have four children. Smith is a Christian, and a member of Calvary Assembly MD, an Assemblies of God church. Smith is a Republican.
