= Matthew Schindler =

American politician (born 1983)

Matthew J. Schindler
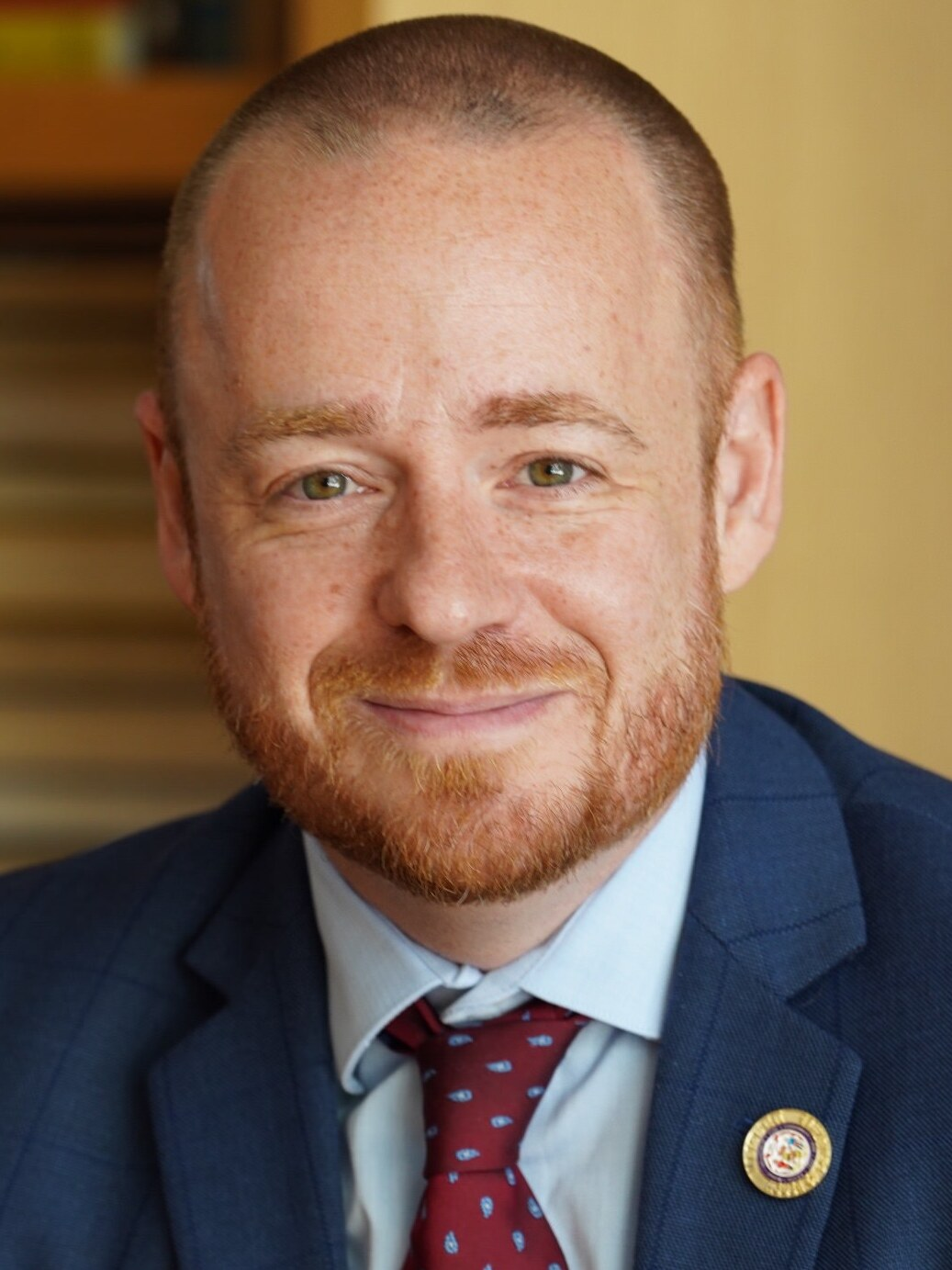
- Schindler in 2025

Member of the Maryland House of Delegates from the 2B district
- Incumbent
- Assumed office January 7, 2025
- Appointed by: Wes Moore
- Preceded by: Brooke Grossman

Member of the Hagerstown City Council
- In office March 21, 2023 – November 25, 2024
- Preceded by: Tekesha Martinez
- Succeeded by: Erika Bell; Caroline Anderson; Sean Flaherty

Personal details
- Born: November 22, 1983 (age 42) Hagerstown, Maryland, U.S.
- Party: Democratic
- Spouse: Desiree (divorced)
- Children: 1
- Education: Hagerstown Community College; University of Maryland Global Campus (BS)
- Occupation: IT manager

Matthew J. Schindler (born November 22, 1983) is an American politician who is a member to the Maryland House of Delegates from District 2B. A member of the Democratic Party, he was previously a member of the Hagerstown City Council from 2023 to 2024.

== Early life and education ==
Schindler was born on November 22, 1983, in Hagerstown, Maryland. He was raised in Hagerstown, graduating from North Hagerstown High School in 2001, afterwards attending Hagerstown Community College in 2003 before earning a Bachelor of Science degree in Computer Networks and Cybersecurity from the University of Maryland, University College in 2021.

== Career ==
Schindler is an IT manager for the National Capital Bank of Washington. He is also a member of the University System of Maryland at Hagerstown board of advisors.

Schindler ran for the Hagerstown City Council in 2020, but was defeated in the nonpartisan primary election, placing second-to-last with 5.5 percent of the vote. In March 2023, after Hagerstown city councilor Tekesha Martinez was appointed to be the mayor of Hagerstown following Emily Keller's resignation to serve in the cabinet of Governor Wes Moore, Schindler applied to serve the remainder of Martinez's term on the City Council. The City Council selected Schindler to succeed her, and was sworn in on March 21, 2023. Schindler ran for a full four-year term in 2024, placing third in the primary election, but was defeated in the general election, placing seventh with 8.81 percent of the vote. He left office on November 25, 2024.

== Maryland House of Delegates ==
In December 2024, following the resignation of State Delegate Brooke Grossman, Schindler applied to serve the remainder of Grossman's term in the Maryland House of Delegates. The Washington County Democratic Central Committee unanimously voted to nominate Schindler to the seat later that month.

Schindler was sworn in on January 7, 2025. He was a member of the Appropriations Committee during the 2025 legislative session, afterwards serving on the Government, Labor, and Elections Committee.

== Political positions ==
During his 2020 Hagerstown City Council campaign, Schindler expressed concerns with the cost of a new stadium for the Hagerstown Suns, saying that he'd prefer city funds be spent renovating the current ballpark. He also said he would make staffing and retention initiatives for the city's police and fire department the "highest priority in the city budget", and would prioritize the city's economic development and revitalization efforts by appealing to entrepreneurs and new employers. In October 2023, Schindler participated in a United Auto Workers strike at Hagerstown's Mack Trucks plant.

In July 2024, following a fatal shooting in downtown Hagerstown, Schindler suggested establishing a violent crimes task force. He also expressed frustration with a letter written by state senator Paul D. Corderman accusing city officials of "remaining silent, with no plan" to address violent crime and describing the city as "in crisis and under siege", saying that he appreciated the state delegation's willingness to "come to the table with us", but felt the letter was "very politically motivated and kind of accusatory when we're all working for the same thing".

During the 2026 legislative session, Schindler voted for a bill that would prohibit counties from entering into 287(g) program agreements with U.S. Immigration and Customs Enforcement. He also introduced a bill that would ban the operation of a detention facility in any building not originally designed for processing or holding detained individuals.

In June 2026, Schindler supported a 12-month moratorium on data center construction passed by the Washington County Board of Commissioners, saying that while there were "a lot of front-loaded benefits to data centers", jurisdictions that build "start to find out the consequences" after they're built.

== Personal life ==
Schindler is divorced and has a son he adopted with his former wife, Desiree, in 2012.

Schindler coaches youth sports and is a fan of the Baltimore Orioles. He attended high school with professional wrestler LA Knight and helped arrange an event during which Knight was presented the key to the city of Hagerstown.

== Electoral history ==
Hagerstown city council primary election, 2020
Candidate	Votes	%
Kristin B. Aleshire	3,762	13.2
Shelley McIntire	3,052	10.7
Bob Bruchey	2,517	8.8
Tiara Burnett	2,513	8.8
Penny May Nigh	2,451	8.6
Brenda Thiam	2,420	8.5
Peter E. Perini, Sr	2,021	7.1
Austin Heffernan	1,990	7.0
Tekesha Martinez	1,972	6.9
Brooke Grossman	1,907	6.7
Chip Snyder	1,825	6.4
Matthew J. Schindler	1,586	5.5
Travis Aaron Sites	585	2.0

Hagerstown city council primary election, 2024
Candidate	Votes	%
Kristin Aleshire (incumbent)	2,617	16.12
Tiara Burnett (incumbent)	2,062	12.70
Matthew Schindler (incumbent)	1,660	10.22
Peter Perini (incumbent)	1,579	9.73
Sean Flaherty	1,453	8.95
Erika Bell	1,369	8.43
Stacy Michael	1,347	8.30
Caroline Anderson	1,252	7.71
Mark Bell	1,101	6.78
Rich Owens	1,074	6.61
Journie Martinez	722	4.45
Total votes	16,236	100.0

Hagerstown city council election, 2024
Candidate	Votes	%
Tiara Burnett (incumbent)	6,371	13.37
Kristin Aleshire (incumbent)	6,363	13.35
Erika Bell	5,412	11.36
Caroline Anderson	4,557	9.56
Sean Flaherty	4,394	9.22
Mark Bell	4,373	9.18
Matthew Schindler (incumbent)	4,199	8.81
Peter Perini (incumbent)	4,046	8.49
Stacy Michael	3,999	8.39
Rich Owens	3,719	7.80
Write-in	233	0.47
Total votes	47,656	100.0
