= Brenda Thiam =

American politician (born 1969)

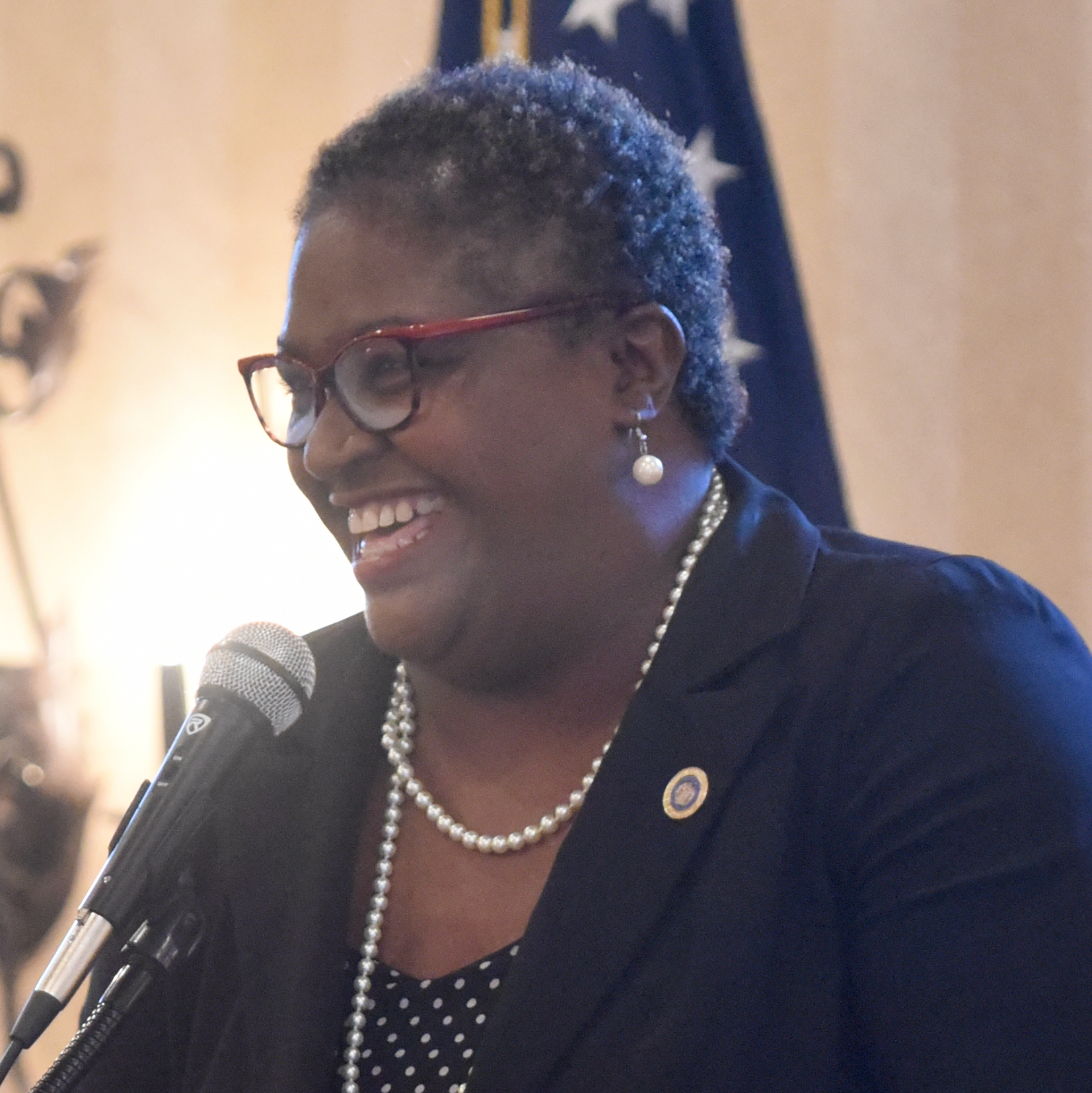
- Thiam in 2021

Member of the Maryland House of Delegates from the 2B district
- In office October 6, 2020 – January 11, 2023
- Appointed by: Larry Hogan
- Preceded by: Paul D. Corderman
- Succeeded by: Brooke Grossman

Personal details
- Born: September 9, 1969 (age 56) Raeford, North Carolina, U.S.
- Party: Democratic (before 2012); Republican (since 2012)
- Spouse: Mam Thiam
- Children: 1
- Education: North Carolina Central University (BS); University of Maryland, College Park (MEd); Capella University (PhD); Pennsylvania State University (GradCert)
- Website: Official website

Brenda Jeanette Thiam (/ˈtʃəm/ cham; born September 9, 1969) is an American politician who was a member of the Maryland House of Delegates from District 2B from 2020 to 2023. A member of the Republican Party, she was the first African-American Republican woman to serve in the Maryland General Assembly.

Thiam ran for election to a full four-year term in 2022, but was defeated by Democrat Brooke Grossman in the general election. In 2024, she unsuccessfully ran for the U.S. House of Representatives in Maryland's 6th congressional district, losing to former state delegate Neil Parrott in the Republican primary election. Thiam unsuccessfully ran for lieutenant governor of Maryland on a ticket with John Myrick in the 2026 Maryland gubernatorial election, after which she again ran for the Maryland House of Delegates.

== Early life and education ==
Brenda Jeanette Thiam was born and raised in Raeford, North Carolina on September 9, 1969. She was one of four children and was raised in a single-mother family after her father, a radio personality, filed for divorce and moved to Memphis, Tennessee.

Thiam graduated from Hoke County High School in 1987, and later attended North Carolina Central University in 1994, earning a Bachelor of Science degree in physical education. She later attended the University of Maryland, College Park, earning a Master of Education degree in 2002; Capella University, where she earned a Doctor of Philosophy degree in special-education leadership in 2015; and Pennsylvania State University, where she earned a graduate certificate in applied behavior management in 2017.

== Career ==
=== Early career ===
After graduating from North Carolina Central University, Thiam worked as a special-education teacher for Washington County Public Schools and for various nonprofits until 2019, While working for the Washington County Public Schools, she secured a $100,000 grant to support the ongoing education of teachers for students with intellectual disabilities. Thiam lost her job just before the start of the COVID-19 pandemic, after which she started her own nonprofit, Oasis Community Support Services Inc., to support the needs of adults with autism.

Thiam first got involved in politics as a member of student government in school. She was a registered Democrat until 2012, when she switched to the Republican Party. From 2016 to 2018, she served as the vice president of the Washington County Republican Club. In 2016, she applied to fill a vacancy on the Washington County Board of Commissioners, which was filled by Wayne Keefer, a small-business owner. In 2020, Thiam successfully ran for the Hagerstown City Council, placing sixth in the nonpartisan primary. Thiam later withdrew from the race after being appointed to the Maryland House of Delegates, but she remained on the ballot for the general election.

=== Maryland House of Delegates ===
In September 2020, following the appointment of Paul D. Corderman to the Maryland Senate, Thiam applied to fill the vacancy left by his resignation in the Maryland House of Delegates. The Washington County Republican Central Committee nominated Thiam to fill the vacancy later that month, and she was appointed to the seat by Governor Larry Hogan on September 23, 2020.

Thiam was sworn into the Maryland House of Delegates on October 6, 2020, where she served on the House Judiciary Committee and was a member of the Legislative Black Caucus of Maryland. She was the first black Republican woman to serve in the Maryland General Assembly and the first black Republican to serve in the legislature in the nearly three decades since Aris T. Allen died in office in 1991. In 2022, Thiam was appointed deputy minority whip.

Thiam ran for election in 2022, seeking a full term in the Maryland House of Delegates. She won the Republican primary election on July 19, 2022, but was defeated by Democratic challenger Brooke Grossman in the general election on November 8. Following her defeat, Thiam called on the Republican Party to "embrace" mail-in voting if it hoped to win future elections.

=== 2024 congressional campaign ===
On June 20, 2023, Thiam filed to run for Congress in Maryland's 6th congressional district in 2024 to succeed David Trone. She announced her candidacy on July 25, 2023. During the Republican primary, she supported tackling the opioid epidemic and requiring recipients of disability benefits to undergo additional assessments to determine whether they're still eligible to continue receiving benefits. Thiam was defeated in the Republican primary election by former state delegate Neil Parrott on May 14, 2024, placing second-to-last with 3.3 percent of the vote.

=== 2026 lieutenant gubernatorial campaign ===
On April 30, 2025, Thiam announced that she would run for lieutenant governor of Maryland in the 2026 Maryland gubernatorial election on a ticket with John Myrick. If elected, Thiam said that she would focus on "fixing education and returning it to teaching the students" by ridding school curricula of "all those strains of ideologies that we will not tolerate for our children". When asked to elaborate on "strains of ideologies", she pointed to students who identify as transgender and "books that are questionable on our bookshelves for students to check out and read". The Myrick-Thiam ticket was defeated in the Republican primary election by former state delegate Dan Cox on June 23, 2026, placing third with 6.4 percent of the vote.

=== 2026 Maryland House of Delegates campaign ===
In August 2026, the Washington County Republican Central Committee nominated Thiam to run for the Maryland House of Delegates in District 2B after Hagerstown city councilmember Sean Flaherty withdrew from the general election. She faces Democratic incumbent Matthew Schindler in the general election.

== Political positions ==
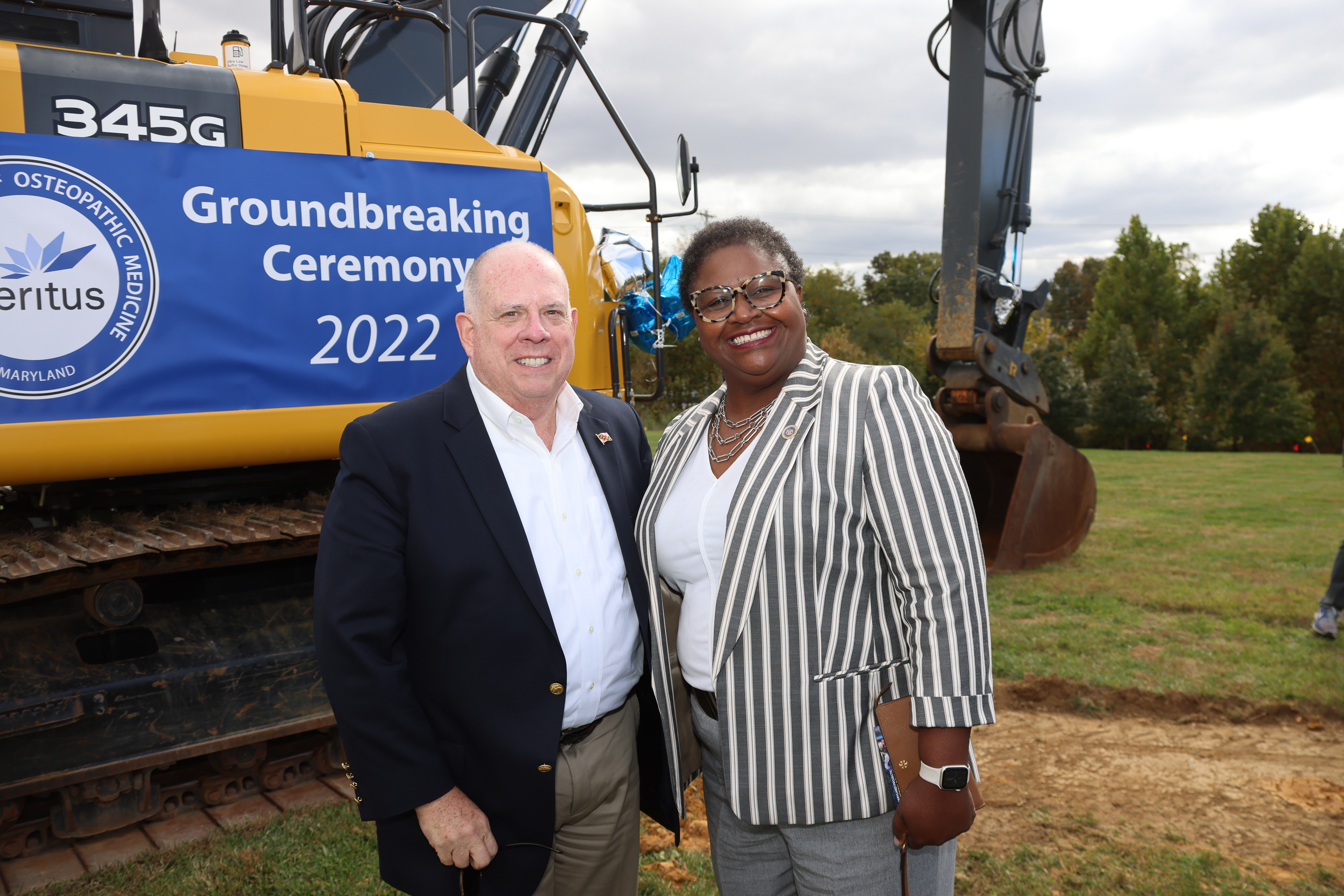
Thiam with Governor Larry Hogan, 2022

During her run for Hagerstown city council, Thiam said she supported addressing the opioid epidemic and improving the city's bond credit rating, and opposed raising taxes. Upon being appointed to the Maryland House of Delegates, she said that her legislative priorities included the opioid epidemic and the Blueprint for Maryland's Future, which she opposed. She also described herself as "pro-life", expressing interest in working with legislators to promote family planning options other than abortions, and said she opposed the "defund the police" movement. Thiam supported the reelection campaign of President Donald Trump in the 2020 United States presidential election.

During the 2021 legislative session, Thiam introduced a bill that would require students to pass a civics test before they could graduate from high school, as well as the "Learning at Home Relief Act", which would provide a $250 per child tax credit toward costs associated with online school, such as child care and internet services. Both bills failed to move out of committee. She also voted for the Maryland Police Accountability Act of 2021, which repealed the Law Enforcement Officers' Bill of Rights, and against the Plastic Bag Reduction Act, a bill to ban the sale of plastic bags and to require stores to charge a minimum of 10 cents for paper bags. In February 2021, during debate on a bill to extend the earned-income tax credit to immigrants, Thiam introduced an amendment that required that benefits only go to "taxpayers of lawful status in the United States". The amendment was rejected by a 48-91 vote.

In October 2021, Thiam was one of five Maryland state legislators from Garrett, Allegany and Washington counties who sent a pair of letters to West Virginia officials asking about annexation of Western Maryland to West Virginia. The letters were later withdrawn by their authors, House Minority Leader Jason C. Buckel and state senator George C. Edwards, following criticism from local officials and some constituents.

During the 2022 legislative session, Thiam introduced a bill to allow municipalities to establish Police Accountability Boards and another to prohibit dirt bike drivers from committing motor vehicle offenses; both bills died in committee. She also expressed concerns with proposals to legalize recreational marijuana in Maryland, questioning whether black Marylanders would be able to make money from the recreational market. In March 2022, during debate on a bill creating a statewide ballot referendum on codifying the right to abortion access, Thiam introduced an amendment requiring the Maryland Department of Health to collect data regarding abortions performed in the state, including gestational age and number of abortions performed. The amendment was rejected by the Maryland House of Delegates by a 39-83 vote.

In January 2022, Thiam filed a lawsuit against the legislative district maps drawn by the Maryland General Assembly during the 2020 redistricting cycle, seeking to replace the newly passed map with one that uses only single-member districts. The Maryland Court of Appeals ruled 4-3 against the plaintiffs in April 2022, upholding the legislature's map.

In April 2022, following a spike in gas prices as the result of the Russo-Ukrainian War, Thiam supported Maryland's brief gas tax holiday, which she later made efforts to extend by an additional 45 days. She also introduced legislation to decouple the state's gas tax from inflation, which failed to pass out of committee.

In July 2022, Thiam said that she supported voter identification requirements, automatic voter registration, and increased purging of voter rolls.

In 2023, Thiam testified in support of a bill to allow municipalities to enforce laws against driving dirt bikes on public roads.

During her 2024 congressional campaign, Thiam said that she supported restarting construction on the Mexico–United States border wall and opposed mask and vaccine mandates imposed during the COVID-19 pandemic. She also said that she disagreed with Judge Deborah Boardman's ruling against requiring the Montgomery County Public Schools system to provide parents with the ability to opt their students out of classroom instruction on LGBTQ topics, and opposed removing Donald Trump from the 2024 presidential election ballot under the Fourteenth Amendment, saying that she did not believe that the January 6 U.S. Capitol attack was an insurrection. Thiam also expressed support for abolishing the U.S. Department of Education.

In October 2023, amid the 2023 Hamas-led attack on Israel and subsequent Gaza war, Thiam expressed support for Israel and its right to defend itself, as well as the expansion of the Abraham Accords and humanitarian efforts in Gaza; however, she later said that she opposed giving foreign aid to any country without first addressing domestic issues and implementing limits on how much aid could be given and for how long. Thiam also opposed calls for a ceasefire in the war, saying that it would allow Hamas to retreat and restrategize for another, deadlier attack on Israel.

== Personal life ==
Thiam is married to her husband, Mam Malick Thiam, who migrated to the United States from Guinea in 2000 and unsuccessfully ran for Washington County Treasurer in 2022. Thiam moved to Germantown, Maryland in 1995. Together, they moved to Hagerstown in October 2006, and have a daughter.

In July 2022, Thiam and her daughter were involved in a car crash in Hagerstown. Both were transported to Meritus Medical Center with minor injuries, and were released later that day.

== Electoral history ==
Hagerstown City Council primary election, 2020
| Candidate | Votes | % |
|---|---|---|
| Kristin B. Aleshire | 3,762 | 13.2 |
| Shelley McIntire | 3,052 | 10.7 |
| Bob Bruchey | 2,517 | 8.8 |
| Tiara Burnett | 2,513 | 8.8 |
| Penny May Nigh | 2,451 | 8.6 |
| Brenda J. Thiam | 2,420 | 8.5 |
| Peter E. Perini, Sr | 2,021 | 7.1 |
| Austin Heffernan | 1,990 | 7.0 |
| Tekesha Martinez | 1,972 | 6.9 |
| Brooke Grossman | 1,907 | 6.7 |
| Chip Snyder | 1,825 | 6.4 |
| Matthew Schindler | 1,586 | 5.5 |
| Travis Aaron Sites | 585 | 2.0 |

Hagerstown City Council election, 2020
| Candidate | Votes | % |
|---|---|---|
| Tiara Burnett | 6,840 | 13.6 |
| Kristin B. Aleshire | 6,178 | 12.5 |
| Tekesha A. Martinez | 5,601 | 11.3 |
| Shelley McIntire | 5,380 | 10.8 |
| Bob Bruchey | 4,770 | 9.6 |
| Peter E. Perini, Sr. | 4,717 | 9.5 |
| Brooke Grossman | 4,293 | 8.7 |
| Penny May Nigh | 4,024 | 8.1 |
| Austin Heffernan | 3,817 | 7.7 |
| Brenda J. Thiam (withdrawn) | 3,772 | 7.6 |
| Write-in | 202 | 0.4 |

Maryland House of Delegates District 2B Republican primary election, 2022
| Party | Candidate | Votes | % |
|---|---|---|---|
| Republican | Brenda J. Thiam (incumbent) | 916 | 54.2 |
| Republican | Thomas Stolz | 773 | 45.8 |

Maryland House of Delegates District 2B election, 2022
| Party | Candidate | Votes | % |
|---|---|---|---|
| Democratic | Brooke Grossman | 5,001 | 54.2 |
| Republican | Brenda J. Thiam (incumbent) | 4,222 | 45.7 |
| Write-in | | 12 | 0.1 |

Maryland's 6th congressional district Republican primary results, 2024
| Party | Candidate | Votes | % |
|---|---|---|---|
| Republican | Neil Parrott | 22,604 | 45.9 |
| Republican | Dan Cox | 14,797 | 30.1 |
| Republican | Mariela Roca | 6,071 | 12.3 |
| Republican | Tom Royals | 2,060 | 4.2 |
| Republican | Chris Hyser | 1,625 | 3.3 |
| Republican | Brenda Thiam | 1,607 | 3.3 |
| Republican | Todd Puglisi (withdrawn) | 446 | 0.9 |

Maryland gubernatorial Republican primary, 2026
| Party | Candidate | Votes | % |
|---|---|---|---|
| Republican | Dan Cox; Robert Krop | 89,982 | 43.3 |
| Republican | Ed Hale; Tyrone Keys | 74,877 | 36.0 |
| Republican | John Myrick; Brenda Thiam | 13,200 | 6.4 |
| Republican | Carl Brunner; Kevin Rhodes | 12,700 | 6.1 |
| Republican | Shannon Wright; Reba Hawkins | 4,907 | 2.4 |
| Republican | L. D. Burkindine; Jeremy Shifflett | 3,746 | 1.8 |
| Republican | Nancy Taylor†; Rachael "Mohawk" Swift | 3,690 | 1.8 |
| Republican | Michael Oakes; Ronald Abend | 2,583 | 1.2 |
| Republican | Douglas Larcomb; Martina Duncan | 2,132 | 1.0 |
| Total votes | | 207,817 | 100.0 |
