= Tekesha Martinez =

American politician (born 1978)

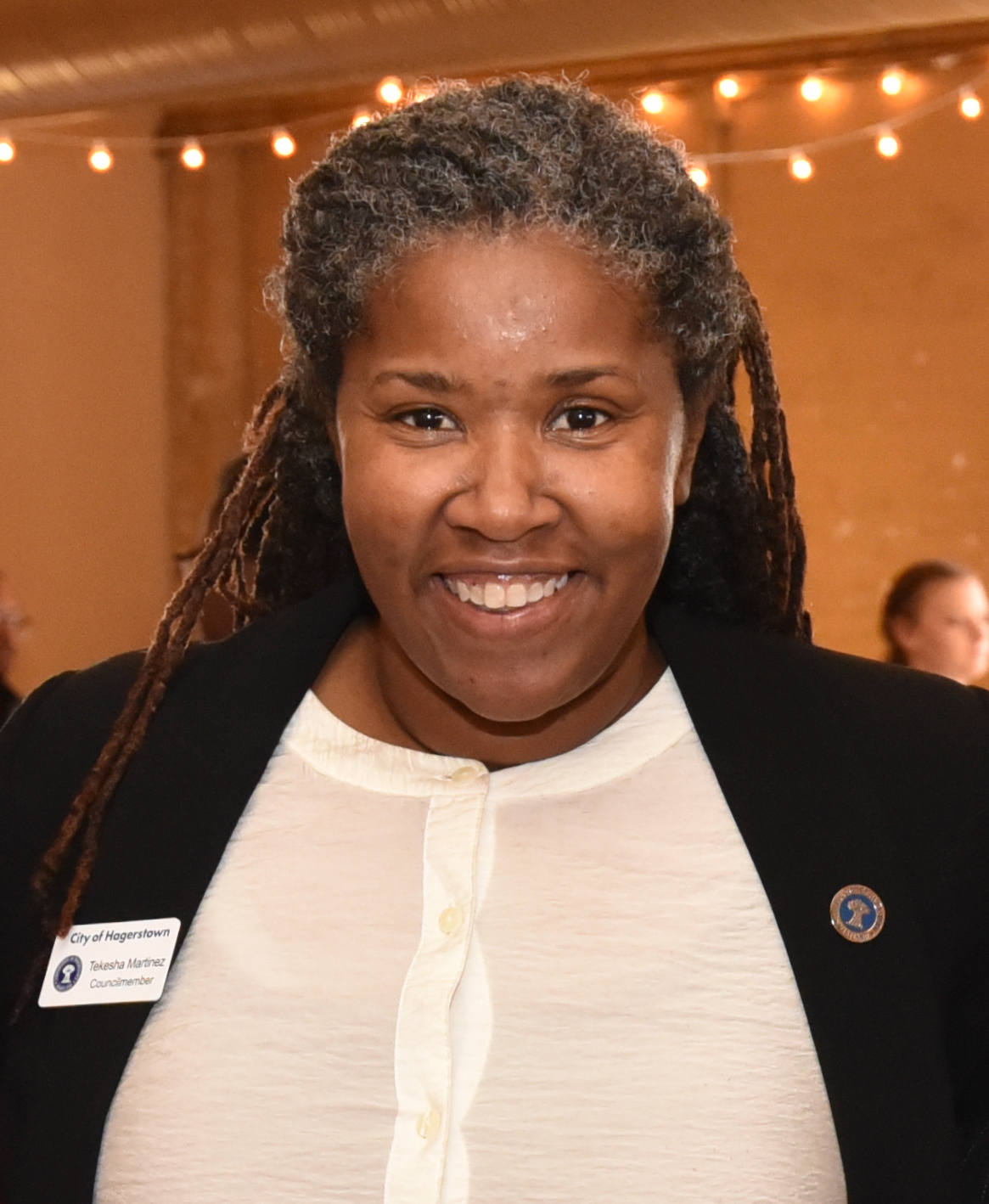

17th Mayor of Hagerstown
- In office February 7, 2023 – November 25, 2024
- Preceded by: Emily Keller
- Succeeded by: Bill McIntire

Member of the Hagerstown City Council
- In office November 23, 2020 – February 7, 2023
- Succeeded by: Matthew Schindler

Personal details
- Born: April 2, 1978 (age 48) Hagerstown, Maryland, U.S.
- Party: Democratic
- Children: 5
- Website: Official website (archived)

Tekesha A. Martinez (born April 2, 1978) is an American politician who was the mayor of Hagerstown, Maryland, from 2023 to 2024. She was appointed to be Hagerstown's first Black mayor in 2023.

Prior to her mayoral appointment in Hagerstown, Martinez was elected to a seat on the City Council, becoming one of the first Black women councilmembers elected in the city's history. Martinez has also worked at the Washington County Boys and Girls Club and served as a community mediator for the Washington County Community Mediation Center.

== Early life ==
Martinez was born and raised in Hagerstown, Maryland, where she attended local schools and grew up in the Washington County foster care system. While still at high school, she became pregnant and gave birth to her first of five children at the age of 17. Martinez experienced difficulty with raising her child and sought help from social service agencies, who ignored her, prompting her to move to Baltimore, where she became interested in poetry. She moved back to Hagerstown and took multiple jobs in hospitality, retail, and construction. She then became involved with the Washington County Boys and Girls Club, which she attended as a youth.

== Community mediation and political career ==
Martinez then worked as a program director at the Robert W. Johnson Community Center, getting connected with an opportunity for employment at the Washington County Community Mediation Center (WCCMC). The WCCMC provides assistance in resolving disagreements, including landlord-tenant disputes and conflicts among neighbors. Martinez became a community mediator at WCCMC and went on to co-lead the program in 2019 even after the Hagerstown Community Action Council canceled the program due to funding. Martinez first became interested in politics after working at the WCMC and the Robert W. Johnson Community Center.

=== Hagerstown City Council ===
Martinez ran for Hagerstown City Council in 2020. In the primary election, she placed 9th out of 13 candidates, with the 10 candidates earning the most votes advancing to the general election. She then placed third in the general election in November and was elected to the City Council.

While serving out her Council term from 2020 to 2023, Martinez focused on helping the Jonathan Street community and addressing public safety.

=== Mayor of Hagerstown ===
In January 2023, following Maryland Governor-elect Wes Moore's appointment of Hagerstown mayor Emily Keller as Special Secretary of Opioid Response, Martinez applied to serve out the remainder of Keller's term as mayor. The Hagerstown City Council unanimously voted to appoint Martinez as mayor on February 7, 2023. She was succeeded on the Hagerstown City Council by Matthew Schindler.

As Mayor of Hagerstown, Martinez focused on implementing the existing strategic plan from Mayor Keller's administration. One project of focus was a proposed indoor sports complex aiming to draw in visitors for competitive regional athletic tournaments and promote recreation.

Martinez left office on November 25, 2024, afterwards moving to a house just outside of Hagerstown's city limits. In December 2024, Martinez told The Baltimore Banner that she would never seek office in Hagerstown again after experiencing threats and attacks during her tenure as mayor. Toward the end of her term, Republican officials in the county—including state senator Paul D. Corderman and county commissioner Derek Harvey—accused Martinez and the city council of "remaining silent" on public safety issues and underfunding local police departments following a fatal shooting in downtown Hagerstown in July 2024, which led to racist comments toward Martinez on her Facebook page.

=== 2024 congressional campaign ===
In July 2023, Martinez filed to run for Congress in Maryland's 6th congressional district. She announced her campaign on July 12, 2023, in Hagerstown. Martinez was seen as a strong fundraiser and leading candidate during the Democratic primary, but behind frontrunners Joe Vogel and April McClain Delaney, and ran on a platform including public safety, local economic development, homelessness, mental illness recovery programs, and public education. Martinez was defeated by former National Telecommunications and Information Administration deputy administrator April McClain Delaney in the Democratic primary election on May 14, 2024, placing fourth with 7.0 percent of the vote.

== Electoral history ==
Hagerstown City Council primary election, 2020
Candidate	Votes	%
Kristin B. Aleshire	3,762	13.2
Shelley McIntire	3,052	10.7
Bob Bruchey	2,517	8.8
Tiara Burnett	2,513	8.8
Penny May Nigh	2,451	8.6
Brenda J. Thiam	2,420	8.5
Peter E. Perini, Sr	2,021	7.1
Austin Heffernan	1,990	7.0
Tekesha A. Martinez	1,972	6.9
Brooke Grossman	1,907	6.7
Chip Snyder	1,825	6.4
Matthew J. Schindler	1,586	5.5
Travis Aaron Sites	585	2.0

Hagerstown City Council general election, 2020
Candidate	Votes	%
Tiara Burnett	6,840	13.6
Kristin B. Aleshire	6,178	12.5
Tekesha A. Martinez	5,601	11.3
Shelley McIntire	5,380	10.8
Bob Bruchey	4,770	9.6
Peter E. Perini, Sr.	4,717	9.5
Brooke Grossman	4,293	8.7
Penny May Nigh	4,024	8.1
Austin Heffernan	3,817	7.7
Brenda J. Thiam (withdrawn)	3,772	7.6
Write-in	202	0.4

Maryland's 6th congressional district Democratic primary results, 2024
Party	Candidate	Votes	%
Democratic	April McClain Delaney	22,985	40.4
Democratic	Joe Vogel	14,940	26.3
Democratic	Ashwani Jain	4,750	8.3
Democratic	Tekesha Martinez	3,992	7.0
Democratic	Lesley Lopez	2,600	4.6
Democratic	Laurie-Anne Sayles	1,845	3.2
Democratic	Destiny Drake West	1,086	1.9
Democratic	Mohammad Mozumder	1,005	1.7
Democratic	Joel Martin Rubin (withdrawn)	820	1.4
Democratic	Peter Choharis (withdrawn)	818	1.4
Democratic	Geoffrey Grammer (withdrawn)	651	1.1
Democratic	George Gluck	437	0.8
Democratic	Kiambo White	401	0.7
Democratic	Stephen McDow (withdrawn)	246	0.4
Democratic	Altimont Wilks	179	0.3
Democratic	Adrian Petrus	166	0.3
