= Western Maryland Delegation =

Delegation in the Maryland General Assembly

The Western Maryland Delegation refers to the members of the Maryland House of Delegates who reside in or represent legislative districts that include parts of Garrett, Allegany, Washington, Frederick or Carroll counties in the state of Maryland, United States of America. Three delegates are elected from each district, though some districts are divided into sub-districts.

== Current members ==
District	Counties represented	Delegate	Party	First elected	Committee
1A	Allegany, Garrett	Wendell R. Beitzel	Republican	2006	Appropriations
1B	Allegany	Jason Buckel	Republican	2014	Ways & Means
1C	Allegany, Washington	Mike McKay	Republican	2014	Appropriations
2A	Washington	William Wivell	Republican	2008	Environment & Transportation
2A	Washington	Neil Parrott	Republican	2010	Environment & Transportation
2B	Washington	Paul D. Corderman	Republican	2017	Appropriations
3A	Frederick	Carol L. Krimm	Democratic	2014	Appropriations
3A	Frederick	Karen Lewis Young	Democratic	2014	Health & Government Operations
3B	Frederick	Ken Kerr	Democratic	2018	Health & Government Operations
4	Carroll, Frederick	Dan Cox	Republican	2018	Judiciary
4	Carroll, Frederick	Barrie Ciliberti	Republican	2015, prior service 1995-1999	Environment & Transportation
4	Carroll, Frederick	Jesse Pippy	Republican	2018	Judiciary
5	Carroll	Haven Shoemaker	Republican	2014	Ways & Means
5	Carroll	April Rose	Republican	2015	Ways & Means
5	Carroll	Susan W. Krebs	Republican	2002	Health & Government Operations

== See also ==
- Current members of the Maryland State Senate
