= Maryland Legislative District 2 =

American legislative district

Maryland's legislative district 2
- Represents part of Washington County
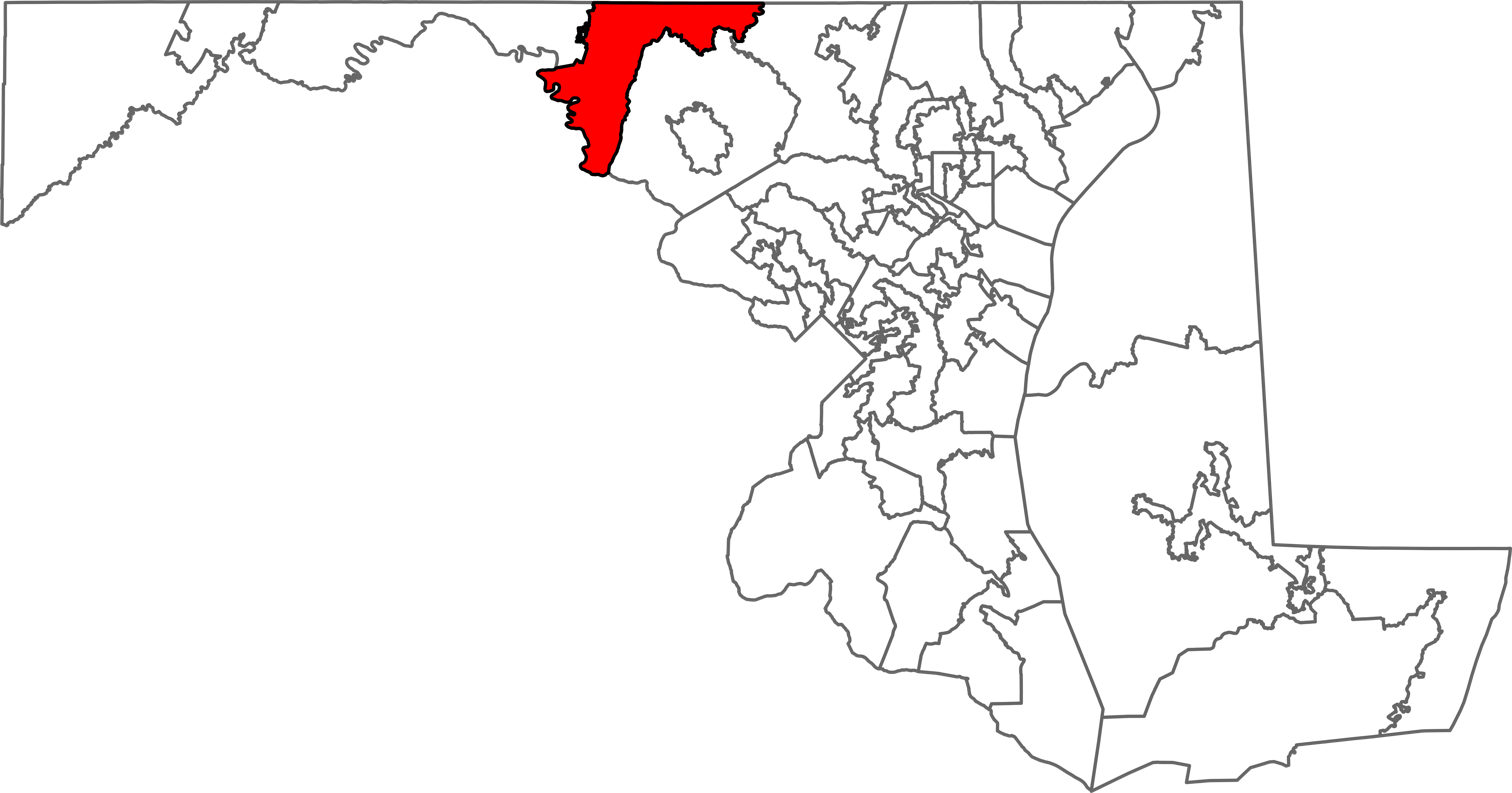
- Senator: Paul D. Corderman (R)
- Delegate(s): William Valentine (R) (District 2A); William J. Wivell (R) (District 2A); Matthew Schindler (D) (District 2B)
- Registration: 42.6% Republican; 34.7% Democratic; 21.1% unaffiliated
- Demographics: 73.9% White; 12.7% Black/African American; 0.3% Native American; 2.1% Asian; 0.0% Hawaiian/Pacific Islander; 3.2% Other race; 7.7% Two or more races; 7.2% Hispanic
- Population (2020): 136,004
- Voting-age population: 106,380
- Registered voters: 86,264

Maryland Legislative District 2 is one of 47 districts in the state for the Maryland General Assembly. It covers part of Washington County. The district is divided into two sub-districts for the Maryland House of Delegates: District 2A and District 2B.

== Demographic characteristics ==
As of the 2020 United States census, the district had a population of 136,004, of whom 106,380 (78.2%) were of voting age. The racial makeup of the district was 100,530 (73.9%) White, 17,277 (12.7%) African American, 421 (0.3%) Native American, 2,895 (2.1%) Asian, 42 (0.0%) Pacific Islander, 4,392 (3.2%) from some other race, and 10,410 (7.7%) from two or more races. Hispanic or Latino of any race were 9,785 (7.2%) of the population.

The district had 86,264 registered voters as of October 17, 2020, of whom 18,172 (21.1%) were registered as unaffiliated, 36,768 (42.6%) were registered as Republicans, 29,915 (34.7%) were registered as Democrats, and 787 (0.9%) were registered to other parties.

== Political representation ==
The district is represented for the 2023–2027 legislative term in the State Senate by Paul D. Corderman (R) and in the House of Delegates by William Valentine (R, District 2A) and William J. Wivell (R, District 2A), Matthew Schindler (D, District 2B).

== Election history ==
Years	Senator	Party	Electoral history
January 18, 1967 – January 3, 1971	Goodloe Byron	Republican	Elected in 1966. Retired to run for U.S. Representative.
January 3, 1971 – January 8, 1975	Edward P. Thomas	Republican	Elected in 1970. Redistricted to the 3rd district.
January 8, 1975 – July 31, 1977	John P. Corderman	Democratic	Elected in 1974. Resigned to become a Washington; County Circuit Court Judge.
August 16, 1977 – June 20, 1990	Victor Cushwa	Democratic	Appointed to finish Corderman's term. Elected in 1978. Re-elected in 1982. Re-elected in 1986. Resigned.
June 20, 1990 – January 9, 1991	Patricia Cushwa	Democratic	Appointed to finish Cushwa's term. Lost election.
January 9, 1991 – January 12, 2011	Donald F. Munson	Republican	Elected in 1990. Re-elected in 1994. Re-elected in 1998. Re-elected in 2002. Re-elected in 2006. Lost renomination.
January 12, 2011 – January 21, 2015	Christopher B. Shank	Republican	Elected in 2010. Re-elected in 2014. Resigned.
February 2, 2015 – August 1, 2020	Andrew A. Serafini	Republican	Appointed to finish Shank's term. Elected in 2018. Resigned.
September 1, 2020 – present	Paul D. Corderman	Republican	Appointed to finish Serafini's term. Elected in 2022. Re-elected in 2026.
