= Senator Corderman =

Senator Corderman may refer to:

- John P. Corderman (1942–2012), Nebraska State Senate
- Paul D. Corderman (born 1977), Maryland State Senate, son of John P. Corderman
