= William J. Wivell =

American politician (born 1964)

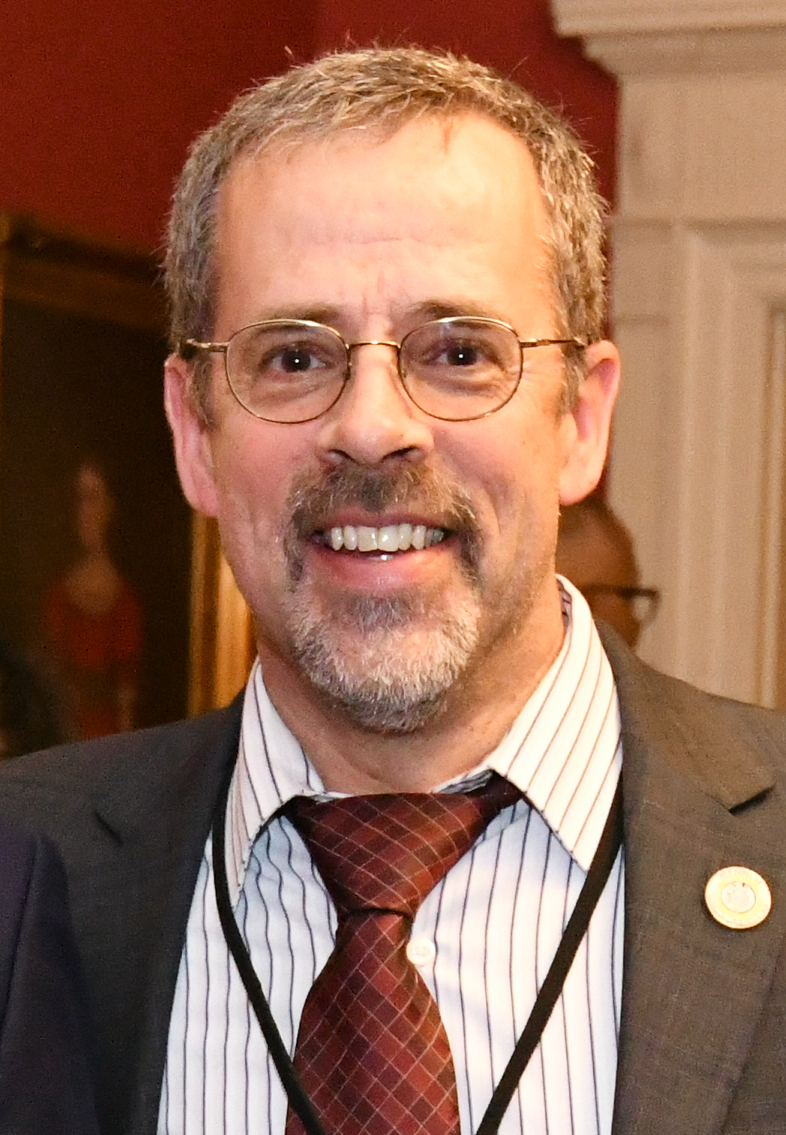
- Wivell in 2020

Member of the Maryland House of Delegates from the 2A district
- Incumbent
- Assumed office March 16, 2015 Serving with William Valentine
- Appointed by: Larry Hogan
- Preceded by: Andrew A. Serafini

Personal details
- Born: William Joseph Wivell; June 9, 1964 (age 62) Hagerstown, Maryland, U.S.
- Party: Republican
- Spouse: Robin Lynne

William Joseph Wivell (born June 9, 1964) is an American politician who has served as a member of the Maryland House of Delegates representing District 2A since 2015. A member of the Republican Party, he was previously a member of the Washington County Board of Commissioners from 1998 to 2010, and from 2014 to 2015.

== Early life and career ==
Wivell was born in Hagerstown, Maryland on June 9, 1964. He attended Smithsburg High School in Smithsburg, Maryland and graduated from Hagerstown Community College with a A.A. degree in 1984. He later graduated from Shepherd University with a B.A. in 1986, and from Mount Saint Mary's University with an M.B.A. in 1991. Wivell currently works as a business administrator at the St. James School.

In 1998, Wivell was elected to the Washington County Board of County Commissioners, where he served until he retired in 2010 to "take a break from public life to focus on other things". In 2008, he applied to fill a vacancy in the Maryland House of Delegates following the resignation of Robert A. McKee. Wivell was re-elected to the Board of County Commissioners in 2014, where he served until Governor Larry Hogan appointed him to serve in the Maryland House of Delegates in February 2015, filling a vacancy left by the resignation of delegate Andrew A. Serafini to serve in the Maryland Senate.

Wivell is an endowment life member of the National Rifle Association.

== In the legislature ==
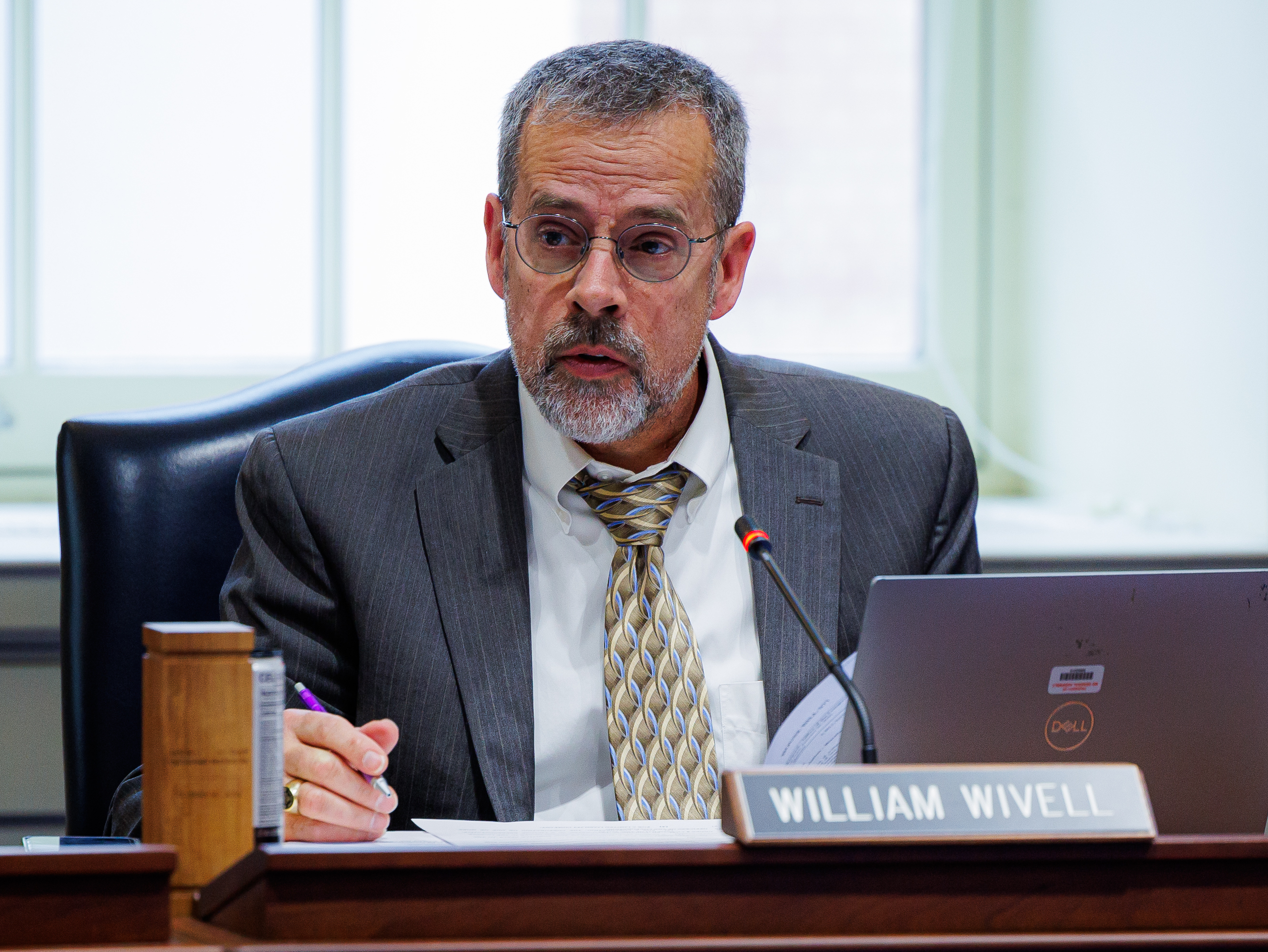
Wivell in the House Economic Matters Committee, 2025

Wivell was sworn into the Maryland House of Delegates on March 16, 2015. He was a member of the Appropriations Committee from 2015 to 2016, afterwards serving on the Environment and Transportation Committee until 2022. Since 2023, Wivell has served on the Economic Matters Committee.

In January 2020, Wivell was named as the co-chairman of the Washington County Trump Leadership team.

In August 2020, following the resignation of state Senator Andrew A. Serafini, Wivell applied to fill the vacancy he left in the Maryland Senate. The Washington County Republican Central Committee and Governor Larry Hogan would end up nominating delegate Paul D. Corderman to fill the vacancy.

In October 2021, Wivell was one of five Maryland state legislators from Garrett, Allegany, and Washington counties who sent a pair of letters to West Virginia officials asking about annexation of Western Maryland to West Virginia. These letters caused a local uproar, with Allegany County officials calling the request a political stunt, an embarrassment and unneeded distraction. Following criticism from local officials and some constituents, Delegate Jason Buckel and State Senator George Edwards issued a letter withdrawing support for the secession proposal.

== Political positions ==
=== Development initiatives ===
During the 2017 legislative session, Wivell introduced a bill to provide sales tax exemptions for development at Fort Ritchie. In March 2017, he voted against legislation to dissolve the PenMar Development Corporation, a state-owned company tasked with redeveloping Fort Ritchie.

=== Education ===
During the 2020 legislative session, Wivell introduced a bill that would require state colleges to accept 100- and 200-level course credits from community colleges. In 2021, he expressed concerns with the Blueprint for Maryland's Future's costs having voted against the bill during the 2020 legislative session, and to sustain Governor Larry Hogan's veto of the education reform bill. In May 2026, Wivell criticized the Blueprint, saying that it put the state in a bad financial situation and that too much of its funding has gone toward administrative costs.

=== Gun policy ===
Wivell supports the Second Amendment and opposes gun control laws, instead favoring legislation to improve mental health treatment. In 2018, following the 2017 Las Vegas shooting, he voted against bills to ban bump stocks and rapid fire trigger activators.

=== Marijuana ===
During the 2018 legislative session, Wivell introduced legislation that would ban medical marijuana in jails. The bill died in committee, and was subsequently reintroduced in 2019 and 2020.

=== Policing ===
During the 2017 legislative session, Wivell opposed a bill that would prohibit police from asking detainees about their immigration status, which he said would put Marylanders "at risk". In February 2026, he voted against a bill to prohibit counties from entering into 287(g) program agreements with U.S. Immigration and Customs Enforcement.

In 2019, Wivell introduced a bill that would make polygraph tests optional when hiring state correctional officers.

=== Social issues ===
Wivell opposes state funding for abortions. During the 2017 legislative session, he introduced legislation that would place restrictions on late-term abortions, including a bill that would ban "dismemberment abortion" with exemptions for life of the mother. During the 2022 legislative session, during debate on the Abortion Care Access Act, Wivell introduced an amendment that would remove $3.5 million in state funding for clinician training, instead requiring taxpayers to check off on their taxes if they want to contribute to the funds. The amendment was rejected in a 39-87 vote. In 2023, during debate on a bill creating a statewide referendum on enshrining Roe v. Wade into the state constitution, he proposed amendments that would require the constitution to guarantee constitutional rights to the "preborn", and another that would limit the bill to cover only abortions instead of all reproductive health. Both amendments were rejected by the House of Delegates.

During the 2018 legislative session, Wivell supported a resolution endorsing a national convention to create a constitutional amendment on congressional term limits.

In 2021, Wivell introduced a bill that would remove party affiliation from absentee ballot envelopes. The bill passed the House of Delegates, but did not receive a vote in the Senate. It was reintroduced in 2022.

During the 2023 legislative session, Wivell was one of two state delegates to vote against the Maryland Child Victims Act, a bill that would abolish the statute of limitations on child sexual abuse cases.

=== Taxes ===
During the 2020 legislative session, Wivell introduced a bill that would decouple the state's tax code with the federal tax code.

=== Transportation ===
Wivell supports the widening of Interstate 81.

During the 2017 legislative session, Wivell introduced legislation to ban tree planting alongside rights of ways along agriculturally-zoned properties.

In February 2017, Wivell voted against a bill that would make it illegal to block a four-way intersection.

During the 2018 legislative session, Wivell introduced bills that would allow adults to ride scooters without helmets and to end mandatory emissions testing for low-mileage vehicles.

In 2019, Wivell introduced legislation that would require speed cameras to display your speed as a car approaches.

During the 2023 legislative session, Wivell introduced a bill that would allow municipalities to enforce laws against driving dirt bikes on public roads.

== Personal life ==
Wivell is married to his wife, Robin (née Lynne), who unsuccessfully ran for the Washington County Board of Commissioners in 2010 and briefly ran for the Washington County Board of Education in 2016. Wivell attends religious services at St. Mary's Catholic Church in Hagerstown, Maryland.

== Electoral history ==
Washington County Board of Commissioners Republican primary election, 1998
Party	Candidate	Votes	%
Republican	Gregory I. Snook (incumbent)	5,264	15.2
Republican	John P. Corderman	3,977	11.5
Republican	William J. Wivell	3,931	11.3
Republican	John S. Shank (incumbent)	3,215	9.3
Republican	Mary L. Kline	3,154	9.1
Republican	John C. Munson	3,143	9.1
Republican	Clinton H. Wiley	3,139	9.1
Republican	Andrew P. Thomas	2,247	6.5
Republican	Dennis L. Duffey	1,505	4.3
Republican	Timothy Allen Bonds	1,408	4.1
Republican	Albino Jaime Trujillo	1,211	3.5
Republican	William M. Hornbarger II	1,210	3.5
Republican	Joseph Hurd Walker	853	2.5
Republican	Alfred G. Lane	400	1.2

Washington County Board of Commissioners election, 1998
Party	Candidate	Votes	%
Republican	Gregory I. Snook (incumbent)	18,277	12.2
Democratic	Paul L. Swartz (incumbent)	15,645	10.4
Republican	William J. Wivell	15,571	10.4
Democratic	John Lewis Schnebly	15,010	10.0
Independent	Bert Iseminger	13,574	9.0
Democratic	Susan T. Tuckwell	13,374	8.9
Democratic	Ronald L. Bowers	13,207	8.8
Republican	Mary L. Kline	12,011	8.8
Republican	John P. Corderman	11,682	7.8
Democratic	Linda C. Irvin-Craig	11,505	7.8
Republican	John S. Shank (incumbent)	10,267	6.8

Washington County Board of Commissioners election, 2002
Party	Candidate	Votes	%
Republican	Gregory I. Snook (incumbent)	22,578	13.4
Republican	William J. Wivell (incumbent)	21,518	12.8
Republican	James F. Kercheval (incumbent)	19,859	11.8
Republican	Doris J. Nipps	18,273	10.9
Republican	John C. Munson	18,273	10.9
Democratic	Paul L. Swartz (incumbent)	15,615	9.3
Democratic	Bert Iseminger (incumbent)	15,242	9.1
Democratic	Jim Brown	15,126	9.0
Democratic	J. Herbert Hardin	12,967	7.7
Democratic	Constance S. Cramer	9,701	5.8
Write-in		137	0.1

Washington County Board of Commissioners election, 2006
Party	Candidate	Votes	%
Republican	John F. Barr	23,041	12.8
Republican	Terry Baker	20,714	11.5
Republican	William J. Wivell (incumbent)	20,105	11.2
Republican	James F. Kercheval (incumbent)	19,419	10.8
Democratic	Kristin B. Aleshire	18,557	10.3
Democratic	Donna L. Brightman	16,717	9.3
Democratic	Paul L. Swartz	16,239	9.0
Republican	John Munson	16,195	9.0
Democratic	N. Linn Hendershot	14,610	8.1
Democratic	J. Herbert Hardin	14,474	8.0
Write-in		179	0.1

Washington County Board of Commissioners Republican primary election, 2014
Party	Candidate	Votes	%
Republican	Terry Baker (incumbent)	6,082	15.8
Republican	LeRoy E. Myers Jr.	4,808	12.5
Republican	Jeff Cline (incumbent)	4,763	12.4
Republican	John F. Barr (incumbent)	4,644	12.0
Republican	William Joseph Wivell	4,471	11.6
Republican	Ruth Anne Callaham (incumbent)	3,691	9.6
Republican	Bill McKinley (incumbent)	3,626	9.4
Republican	Ed Forrest	2,590	6.7
Republican	John Munson	2,134	5.5
Republican	Rodney Pearson, Sr.	1,743	4.5

Washington County Board of Commissioners election, 2014
Party	Candidate	Votes	%
Republican	Terry Baker (incumbent)	26,515	16.5
Republican	Jeff Cline (incumbent)	24,319	15.1
Republican	John F. Barr (incumbent)	24,119	15.0
Republican	LeRoy Myers	22,655	14.1
Republican	William Joseph Wivell	22,280	13.8
Democratic	Ronald L. Bowers	13,363	8.3
Democratic	Brian Beall	10,589	6.6
Democratic	Paul F. Miller	9,039	5.6
Democratic	Millard H. Miller, Jr.	7,769	4.8
Write-in		264	0.2

Maryland House of Delegates District 2A Republican primary election, 2018
Party	Candidate	Votes	%
Republican	Neil Parrott (incumbent)	4,607	53.4
Republican	William Joseph Wivell (incumbent)	4,019	46.6

Maryland House of Delegates District 2A election, 2018
Party	Candidate	Votes	%
Republican	Neil Parrott (incumbent)	22,422	40.0
Republican	William Joseph Wivell (incumbent)	19,453	34.7
Green	Andrew J. Barnhart	7,371	13.1
Green	Charlotte McBrearty	6,683	11.9
Write-in		141	0.3

Maryland House of Delegates District 2A election, 2022
Party	Candidate	Votes	%
Republican	William Valentine	19,839	49.59
Republican	William J. Wivell	19,458	48.64
Write-in		711	1.78
