= Kathleen Matthews =

American journalist (born 1953)

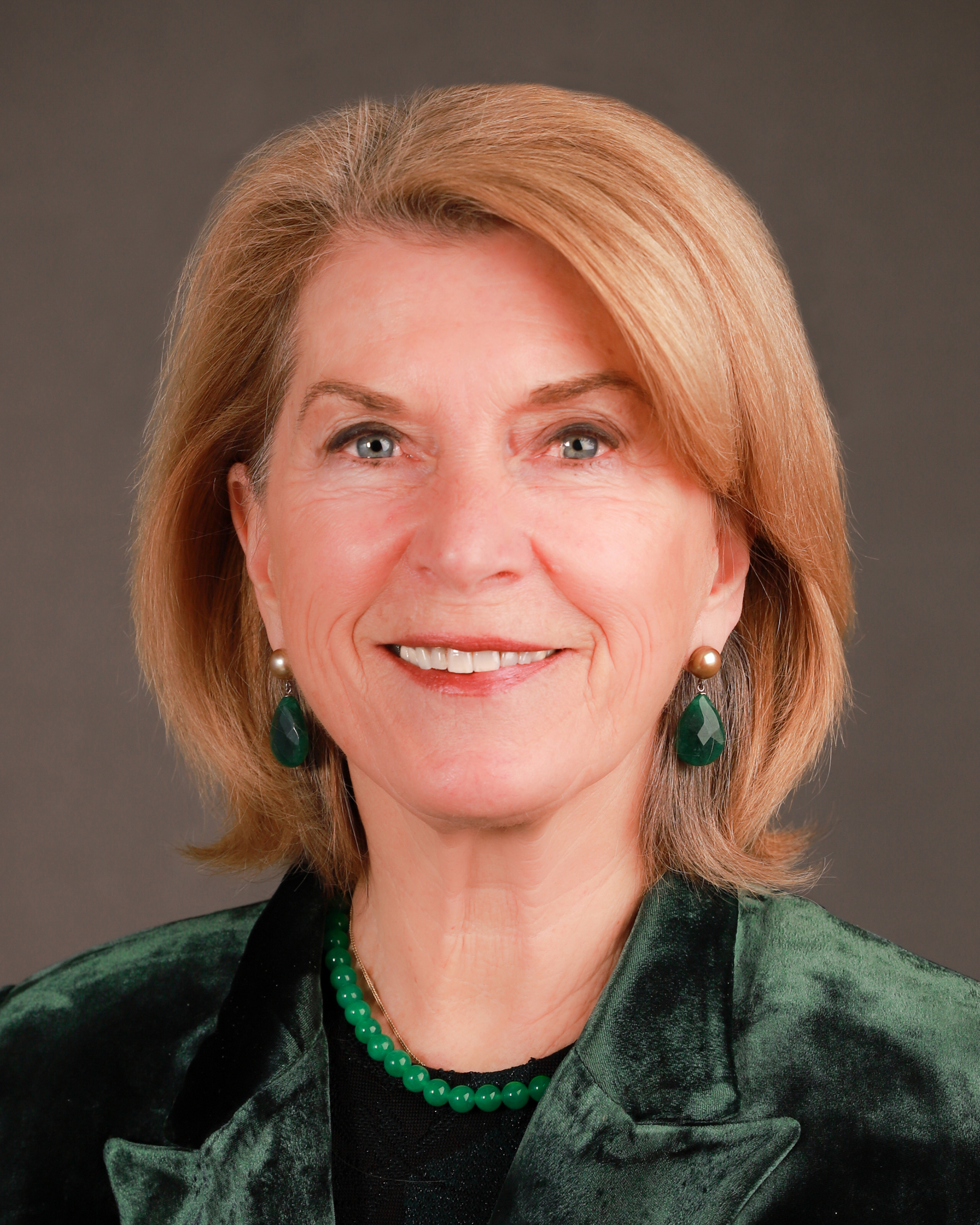

Chair of the Maryland Democratic Party
- In office March 2, 2017 – December 1, 2018; Acting: March 2, 2017 – May 6, 2017
- Preceded by: Bruce Poole
- Succeeded by: Maya Rockeymoore Cummings

Personal details
- Born: Kathleen Ann Cunningham; August 9, 1953 (age 73) San Francisco, California, U.S.
- Party: Democratic
- Spouse: Chris Matthews (m. 1980)
- Children: 3
- Education: Stanford University (BA)

Kathleen Ann Matthews (née Cunningham; born August 9, 1953) is the former chief communications and public affairs officer for hotel company Marriott International. Prior to joining Marriott International, she was a reporter and anchor for 25 years at WJLA-TV. She was a candidate for the U.S. House of Representatives for Maryland's 8th congressional district in the 2016 elections. She is the former chair of the Maryland Democratic Party.

== Early life and education ==
Matthews was born in San Francisco. She is a 1975 graduate of Stanford University. In 2004 she was a Fellow at the Institute of Politics at the John F. Kennedy School of Government at Harvard University. She has honorary degrees from the University of South Carolina and Chestnut Hill College in Philadelphia.

== Career ==
=== Journalism ===
Matthews began working at ABC's Washington D.C. affiliate WJLA in 1976 as a production assistant. She worked her way up to producer and then she was a writer/reporter from 1982 to 1991. In 1991 she began work as an anchor. She was an anchor for 15 years through 2006 when she retired. She hosted the nationally syndicated Working Woman television show beginning in 1991 and executive produced it from 2001 to 2006. Matthews hosted political show Capital Sunday on Sundays. She was named a 2002 Washingtonian of the Year by Washingtonian magazine, and a "Woman Who Means Business" by the Washington Business Journal. She has also been awarded nine local Emmys and an Edward R. Murrow Award, among other top honors during her journalism career.

=== Corporate communications ===
In July 2006, Matthews was named Executive Vice President – Global Communications and Public Affairs at Marriott, responsible for the company's external and internal communications, including global brand and corporate public relations, corporate social responsibility, and government affairs. She also co-chaired Marriott's Executive Green Council.

In March 2015, she resigned from Marriott.

=== Public sector ===
Matthews served on the U.S. Travel and Tourism Advisory Board to the Secretary of Commerce, as well as the boards of the U.S. Travel Association, the International Tourism Partnership, and the Economic Club of Washington. She is active in the World Economic Forum Policy Councils.

== 2016 Democratic congressional primary bid ==
On June 3, 2015, Matthews officially announced that she was a Democratic Party candidate for Maryland's 8th congressional district, where incumbent Chris Van Hollen was relinquishing his House seat in order to run for the United States Senate.

On March 16, 2016, the editorial board of The Washington Post endorsed Matthews, writing, "Our preference for Ms. Matthews boils down to our belief that in Congress, she would be more pragmatic and less doctrinaire than the left-leaning State Senator Jamie Raskin, whose passionate liberalism is unsurpassed in Annapolis. Both candidates supported gun control, clean energy, campaign finance reform and greater investment in education and health research. Ms. Matthews has greater potential, following the Van Hollen model, to move the ball forward in those areas."

In contrast, Raskin enjoyed the endorsement of the Progressive Action PAC, the political arm of the Congressional Progressive Caucus, which grew from 72 members at the time of their December 2017 endorsement, to 92 members in early 2020.

By April 2016, the primary contest had drawn national attention as 2016's most expensive House race, dominated by Trone's deep pockets. Even without Trone's cash, the primary in Washington's prosperous Maryland suburbs became the nation's priciest campaign with total fundraising near the $20 million mark. Raskin and Matthews each collected about $2 million, not counting $500,000 in loans Matthews made to her campaign in March 2016.

On April 26, 2016, Matthews finished third among three frontrunners in the Democratic primary, behind Raskin and businessman David Trone

== Democratic politics ==
On March 1, 2017, Bruce Poole resigned as Chair of the Maryland Democratic Party, and on March 2 Matthews was chosen to be the interim Chair. On May 6, she was elected to a four-year term as state party Chair. Matthews promised to renew a state party infrastructure that has deteriorated in recent years, especially outside traditional Democratic strongholds in Baltimore City and Prince George's and Montgomery counties. She promised to pursue an "all-Maryland strategy" to recruit and support candidates. In December 2018 she was replaced as Chair by Maya Rockeymoore Cummings.

== Personal life ==
She has been married to Chris Matthews, host of Hardball and The Chris Matthews Show since 1980. They live in Chevy Chase, Maryland, and have three children: Michael (1983), Thomas (1986) and Caroline (1989). Matthews is active in her community and industry and has served on the boards of the U.S. Travel Association, Catholic Charities, the Black Student Fund, Suited for Change, Round House Theatre, Ford's Theatre, Shakespeare Theatre Company, Nantucket Film Festival, and Nantucket Dreamland Theater.

Party political offices
Preceded by Bruce Poole	Chair of the Maryland Democratic Party; 2017–2018	Succeeded by Maya Rockeymoore Cummings
