= Andrew A. Serafini =

American politician (born 1962)

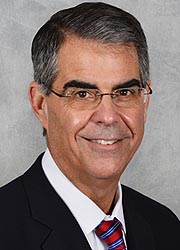

Member of the Maryland Senate from the 2nd district
- In office February 2, 2015 – August 1, 2020
- Preceded by: Christopher B. Shank (R)
- Succeeded by: Paul D. Corderman (R)

Member of the Maryland House of Delegates from the 2A district
- In office March 7, 2008 – February 2, 2015 Serving with Neil Parrott (R)
- Preceded by: Robert A. McKee (R)
- Succeeded by: William J. Wivell (R)

Personal details
- Born: March 9, 1962 (age 64) Hagerstown, Maryland, U.S.
- Party: Republican
- Spouse: Diana
- Children: 4
- Education: North Hagerstown High School, Hagerstown, Maryland
- Alma mater: Shippensburg University of Pennsylvania (B.S.)
- Profession: Financial adviser

Andrew A. Serafini (born March 9, 1962) is an American politician from Maryland and a member of the Republican Party. He was a member of the Maryland Senate from District 2, which covers parts of Washington County, from February 2015 to August 2020. He was also a member of the Maryland House of Delegates from District 2A from March 2008 to February 2015.

== Education ==
Serafini graduated from North Hagerstown High School in Hagerstown, Maryland. After high school, he went to Shippensburg University in south central Pennsylvania where he received a degree in Business Administration in 1983. He also briefly played football there.

== Background ==
After college, Serafini was a pricing analyst for Van Kampen Merritt from 1984 until 1985. He later attended the College of Financial Planning in Denver, Colorado where he received his certified financial planning designation in 1988. He was a financial advisor for Lincoln Investment Planning from 1985 until 1990. Since that time he has been the President of Serafini Financial Services, Inc. in Hagerstown.

In addition to his work, Serafini was also active in many organizations. He was the chair of the Board of Trustees for Grace Academy (where he coached the boys' varsity soccer team to a national title), in Hagerstown from 2005 until 2007 and has been the vice-chair since 2008. He was a former member of the Board of Trustees for the Maryland/Southern Delaware Chapter of the Crohn's and Colitis Foundation. He was the District Chair of the Christian Business Men's Committee, and was the Finance Campaign Chair for John F. Barr, the President of the Board of County Commissioners of Washington County in 2006.

== Career ==
Serafini took the oath of office to become a member of House of Delegates on the afternoon of March 7, 2008. He was assigned to the Ways and Means Committee and the Environmental Matters Committee. He was also a member of the Washington County and Western Maryland Delegations as well as a member of the Maryland Rural Caucus.

On February 2, 2015, Serafini was sworn into the Maryland State Senate to replace Christopher Shank who resigned to become director of the Governor's Office of Crime Control and Prevention.

On July 30, 2020, Maryland's Senate Republican Caucus announced Serafini was resigning effective August 1. Serafini cited long hours and stress, the demands of his financial adviser job, and wanting to spend more time with his family.

== Election results ==
- 2018 Race for Maryland Senate – District 2

Voters to choose one:

Name	Votes	Percent	Outcome
Andrew A. Serafini, Rep.	29,798	71.7%	Won
Jenna L. Roland, Dem.	11,631	28.0%	Lost
Other Write-Ins	158	0.4%	Lost

- 2014 Race for Maryland House Of Delegates – District 2A

Voters to choose two:

Name	Votes	Percent	Outcome
Neil C. Parrott, Rep.	17,599	36.00%	Won
Andrew A. Serafini, Rep.	17,528	35.90%	Won
Elizabeth Paul, Dem.	8,279	16.90%	Lost
Charles Bailey, Dem.	5,419	11.10%	Lost
Other Write-Ins	22	0.04%	Lost

- 2010 Race for Maryland House Of Delegates – District 2A

Voters to choose one:

Name	Votes	Percent	Outcome
Andrew A. Serafini, Rep.	9,754	71.0%	Won
Neil Becker, Dem.	3,757	28.8%	Lost
Other Write-Ins	27	0.2%	Lost
