= Yvette Lewis =

Yvette Lewis may refer to:

- Yvette Lewis (athlete)
- Yvette Lewis (politician)
