= Bruce Poole =

American politician (1959)

D. Bruce Poole
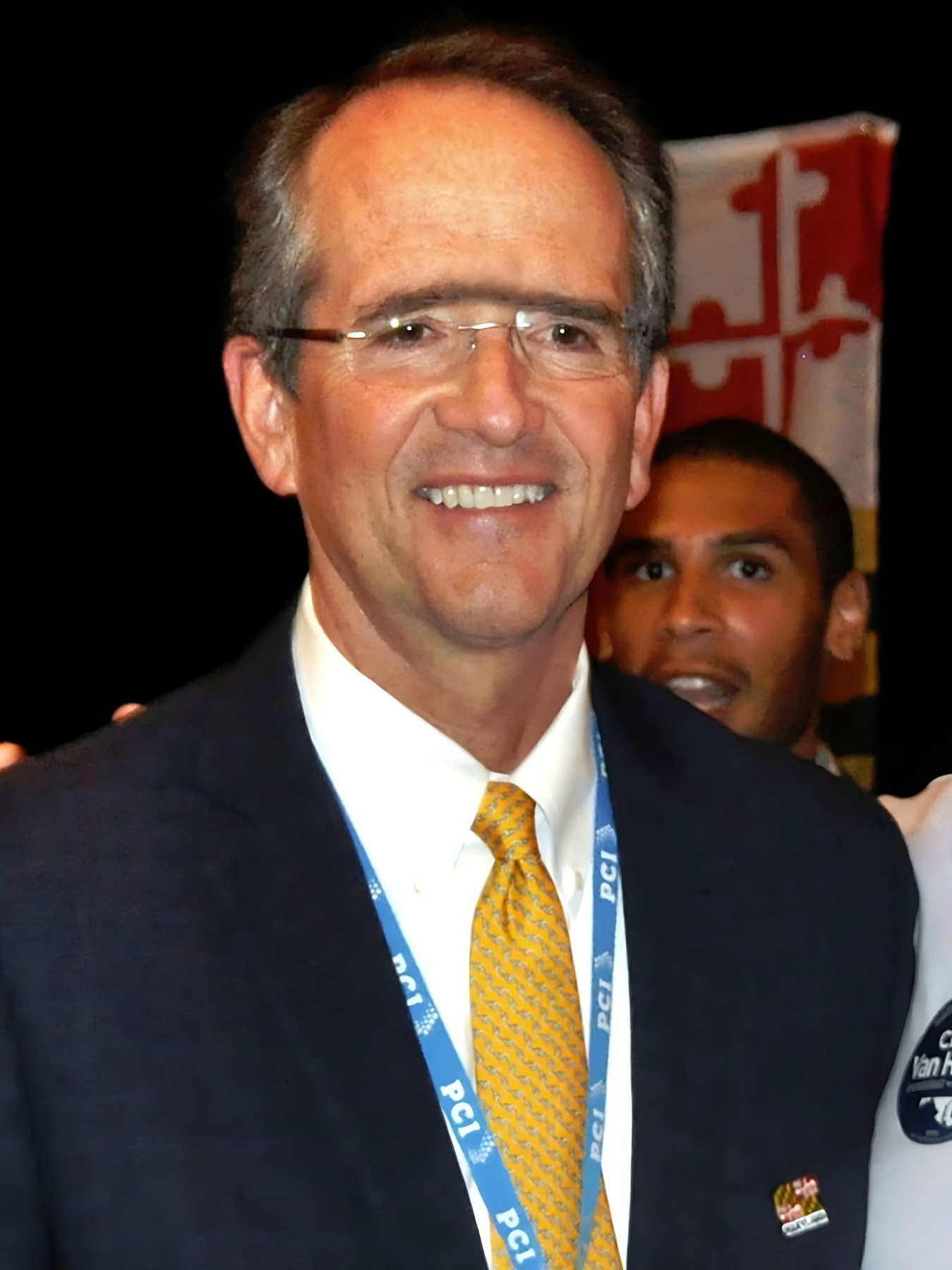
- Poole at the 2016 Democratic National Convention in Philadelphia.

Chair of the Maryland Democratic Party
- In office 2015 – March 2, 2017
- Preceded by: Yvette Lewis
- Succeeded by: Kathleen Matthews

Member of the Maryland House of Delegates from the 2B district
- In office January 1995 – January 1999
- Preceded by: Peter G. Callas
- Succeeded by: Christopher B. Shank

Personal details
- Born: June 17, 1959 (age 67) Hagerstown, Maryland, U.S.
- Party: Democratic
- Education: Washington and Lee University (B.A., J.D.)

D. Bruce Poole (born June 17, 1959) is the former chairman of the Maryland Democratic Party. He was formerly a member of the Maryland House of Delegates representing District 2B, which covers Washington County, Maryland.

Poole was first elected to office in 1986 when he defeated Republican Ronald J. Stansbury for the seat in District 3A. In 1990, he captured 95% of the vote to maintain his seat. In 1994, Poole narrowly won reelection by defeating Republican Richard D. Wiles by 66 votes. He was defeated in 1998 by Republican Christopher Shank.

== Early life and education ==
Poole was born and raised in Washington County. He attended North Hagerstown High School. In 1981, he received his B.A. from Washington and Lee University in Lexington, Virginia. He briefly attended the University of Melbourne before getting his J.D. from Washington and Lee in 1985.

== Career ==
Poole was admitted to the Maryland Bar in 1985 and served as a trial lawyer for several years. He was the secretary of the Washington County Bar Association in 1986 and served as the first president of the United Democratic Club of Washington County.

In 1981, Poole was the recipient of the Rotary International Graduate Fellowship. He was the co-author of the Best Brief in Nation, Jessup International Moot Court Competition in 1984.

Poole is a partner in the Hagerstown, Maryland personal injury, family law and business law firm The Poole Law Group.

Following the 2014 elections in Maryland where the Democrats lost the governor's mansion, Poole was elected Chair of the Maryland Democratic Party, succeeding Yvette Lewis.

On March 1, 2017, after serving two years as Chair of the Maryland Democratic Party, Poole was succeeded by former news anchor and congressional candidate Kathleen Matthews.

== Election results ==
- 1998 Race for Maryland House of Delegates – District 2B

Voters to choose one:

Name	Votes	Percent	Outcome
Christopher B. Shank, Rep.	4,873	51%	Won
D. Bruce Poole	4,626	49%	Lost

- 1994 Race for Maryland House of Delegates – District 2B

Voters to choose one:

Name	Votes	Percent	Outcome
D. Bruce Poole, Dem.	4,219	50%	Won
Richard D. Wiles	4,143	50%	Lost

Party political offices
Preceded by Yvette Lewis	Chair of the Maryland Democratic Party; 2015–2017	Succeeded by Kathleen Matthews
