= Peter G. Callas =

American politician (1926–2022)

Member of the Maryland House of Delegates from the 2B district
- In office 1983–1994
- Preceded by: Irwin F. Hoffman
- Succeeded by: Bruce Poole

Personal details
- Born: February 15, 1926 Hagerstown, Maryland, U.S.
- Died: December 30, 2022 (aged 96)
- Party: Democratic
- Spouse: Margaret (died 2007)
- Education: Columbia University
- Alma mater: Western Maryland College (B.A., M.Ed.); Stockholm University; George Washington University (Ed.D.)
- Occupation: Politician; educator

Military service
- Allegiance: United States
- Branch/service: United States Navy
- Battles/wars: World War II; South West Pacific theatre; Korean War
- Scientific career
- Thesis: A Descriptive Analysis of Appalachian Voluntary Regional Educational Service Agencies

Peter G. Callas (February 15, 1926 – December 30, 2022) an American politician and educator. He was a member of the Maryland House of Delegates, representing District 2B from 1983 to 1994.

== Early life ==
Peter G. Callas was born on February 15, 1926, in Hagerstown, Maryland. He graduated from Western Maryland College (now McDaniel College) in 1949 with a Bachelor of Arts in history and in 1955 with a Master of Education. While at Western Maryland College, Callas played soccer. He received a diploma from Stockholm University in 1950. He attended Columbia University, and graduated from George Washington University with a Doctor of Education in 1972. His dissertation at George Washington University was titled "A Descriptive Analysis of Appalachian Voluntary Regional Educational Service Agencies".

== Career ==
Callas served in the U.S. Navy in the South West Pacific theatre of World War II from 1944 to 1946. He also served in the Korean War from 1951 to 1952.

Callas worked as a school administrator. He was also an adjunct professor at George Washington University. He also taught at Western Maryland College, West Virginia University and Hagerstown Junior College. He was an education consultant in Northern Nigeria from 1965 to 1967 with Washington County's Modern Aids to Education project. He was president of the Selective Service Board in 1975. He was a member and elected as president of the Washington County Board of Education from 1978 to 1982.

Callas served in the Maryland House of Delegates, representing District 2B from 1983 to 1994. He served as a Democrat.

== Personal life and death ==
Callas was married to Margaret (died 2007).

Callas died on December 30, 2022, at the age of 96.

== Legacy ==
In 2008, Callas established a scholarship fund at McDaniel College, in the name of him and his wife.
