= Victor Cushwa Memorial Bridge =

Pedestrian bridge near Hancock, Maryland

Coordinates: 39°43′5.93″N 78°16′52.67″W

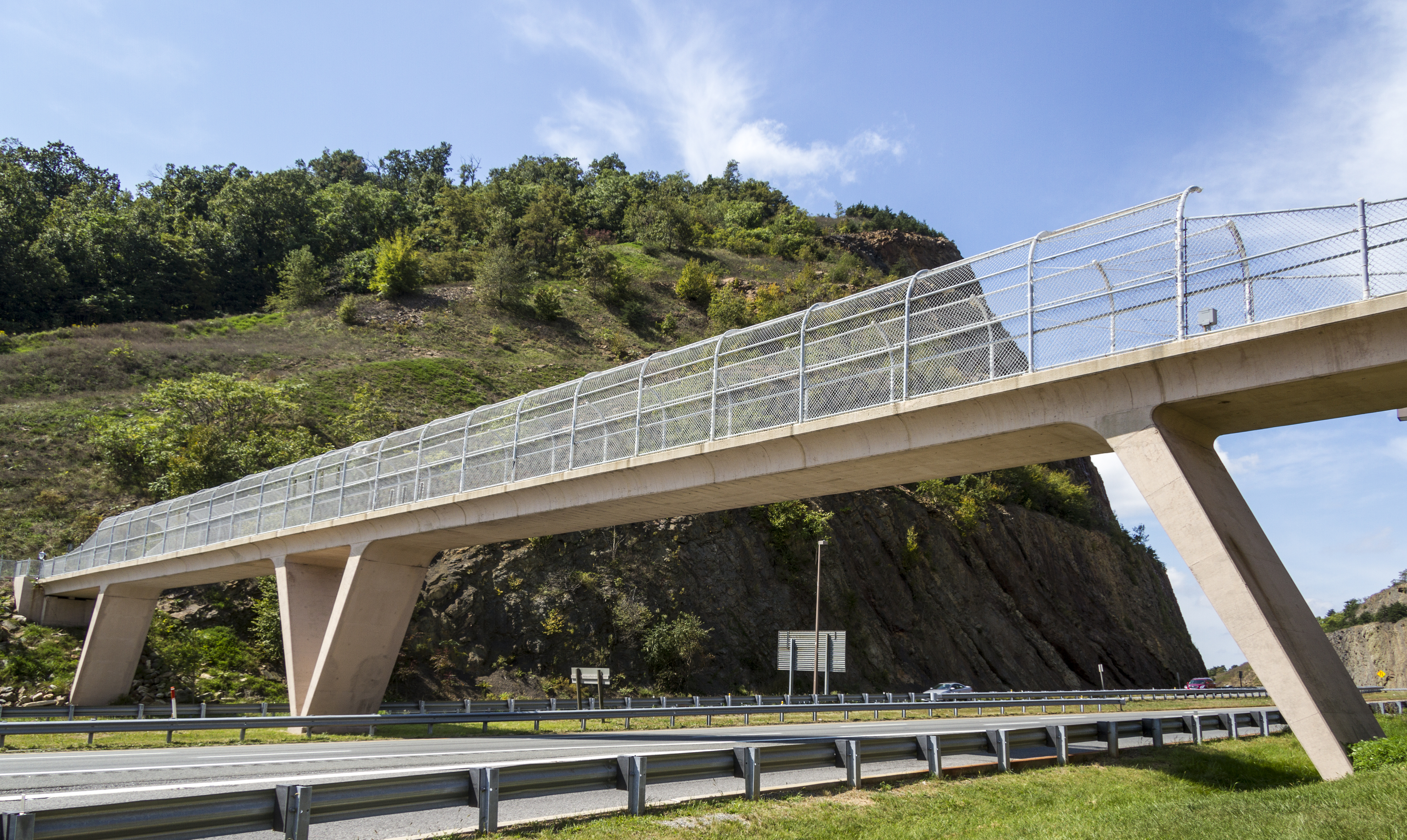
Victor Cushwa Memorial Bridge

The Victor Cushwa Memorial Bridge is a walking beam pedestrian bridge near Hancock, Maryland. It crosses Interstate 68 at the Sideling Hill road cut and rest area, near the northernmost point of I-68. It is named after former Maryland State Senator Victor Cushwa from Washington County.

The bridge once provided access to the Sideling Hill Exhibit Center, which opened in 1991. After closing in 2009, it was partially reopened in 2015 as the Sideling Hill Welcome Center.

The bridge provides viewing access to geologic strata formations of the Ridge-and-Valley Appalachians, which were uncovered when the road was cut through Sideling Hill.
