= Victor Cushwa =

American politician from Maryland, US (1925–1991)

Member of the Maryland Senate from the 2nd district
- In office 1978 – January 1991
- Preceded by: John P. Corderman
- Succeeded by: Patricia Cushwa; Donald F. Munson

Public Service Commission
- In office July 1990 – 1991

Personal details
- Born: 1925 Hagerstown, U.S.
- Died: August 19, 1991 (aged 65–66) Hagerstown, Maryland, U.S.
- Party: Democratic
- Spouse: Patricia Pascoe Cushwa
- Education: Georgetown University
- Military career
- Allegiance: United States
- Branch: U.S. Navy
- Conflicts: World War II

Victor Cushwa IV (1925 – August 19, 1991) was a Democratic state senator representing Legislative District 2 in Western Maryland. In his 13 years as a member of the state Senate, he served as majority whip and chairman of the Rules Committee. He also served on the Constitutional and Public Law, Economic Affairs, and Finance committees. In 1989, Cushwa joined several other senators in a filibuster to block an abortion-rights bill, which eventually fell one vote shy of passing.

Governor William Donald Schaefer appointed Cushwa to a five-year term on the state's utility-regulating Public Service Commission in July 1990 after Cushwa resigned from his state Senate seat. About a year after his appointment, Victor Cushwa died from lung cancer at Washington County Hospital in Hagerstown at the age of 66; he continued his duties on the commission until shortly before his death.

Born in Hagerstown, Cushwa served in the Navy in the Pacific during World War II. He graduated from Georgetown University in 1948, and later served for 20 years as production manager of the Cushwa Brick Co. in Williamsport. The Victor Cushwa Memorial Bridge at Sideling Hill in Western Maryland is named in his honor.
