= Christopher B. Shank =

American politician (born 1972)

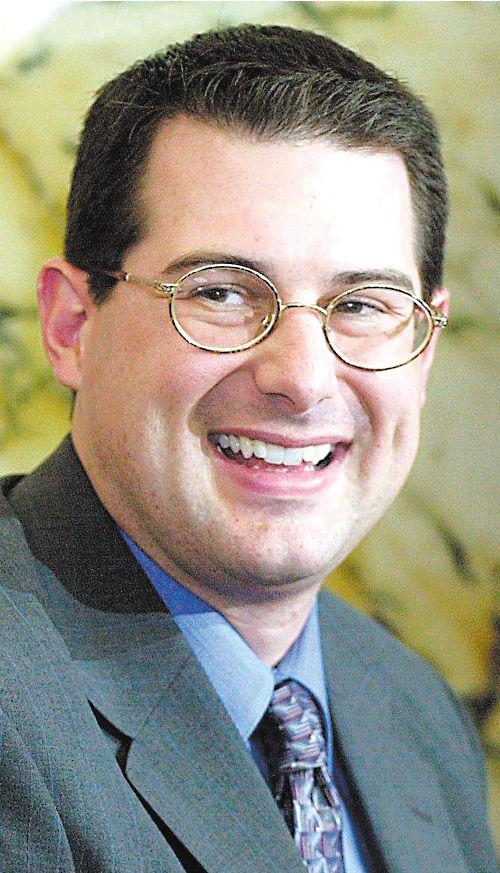

Member of the Maryland Senate from the 2nd district
- In office January 12, 2011 – January 21, 2015
- Preceded by: Donald F. Munson
- Succeeded by: Andrew A. Serafini

Member of the Maryland House of Delegates from the 2B district
- In office January 13, 1999 – January 12, 2011
- Preceded by: Bruce Poole
- Succeeded by: Neil Parrott

Personal details
- Born: June 30, 1972 (age 54) Hagerstown, Maryland
- Party: Republican
- Education: Johns Hopkins University, (B.A.); George Washington University, (M.A.)

Christopher B. Shank (born June 30, 1972) is an American politician who has served in a variety of roles within Maryland state government, including Deputy Chief of Staff and Chief Legislative Officer to Governor Larry Hogan. He has previously served in the Maryland Senate representing the 2nd district in Washington County, including a stint as Senate minority whip.

== Education ==
Shank graduated from South Hagerstown High School in Hagerstown, Maryland, and later attended Johns Hopkins University where he received his B.A. (history) in 1994. He graduated a Phi Beta Kappa. He later attained his M.A. (political management) from the Graduate School of Political Management at the George Washington University in 1998. He was the valedictorian and received the Howard Paley Academic Excellence Award.

== Career ==
After college, Shank was a legislative assistant to the Washington County Delegation. He served in this role from 1994 to 1998. Along with being a delegate he is also an adjunct professor at the Graduate School of Political Management at George Washington University.

He is also a member of the Advisory Committee of the Cold Weather Homeless Shelter of Washington County, serving since 1997. He was formerly on the board of directors for the Washington County Chapter of the American Cancer Society. Shank is a member of the American Legislative Exchange Council (ALEC), serving as Maryland state leader.

In 2008, Shank was given a teaching post in George Washington University's Summer Scholars Program. Shank taught a course on election politics. During the 10-day program he lectured on his experience in campaigning as well as worked with students to simulate a mock campaign.

In January 2010, Shank announced his intention to challenge long-serving state senator Donald Munson based on charges that Munson was "too liberal." On September 14, 2010, Shank defeated Munson in the Republican primary election, winning the party's nomination. Shank received 57.05% of the vote compared to Munson's 42.05%.

On January 13, 2015, Shank was appointed as director of the Governor's Office of Crime Control and Prevention and resigned his state senate seat eight days later.

In 2016, Shank was promoted to the Deputy Chief of Staff of Maryland.

=== Legislative notes ===
- 2005 - voted for slots (HB1361)

== Election results ==
- 2006 race for Maryland House of Delegates – District 2B

Voters to choose one:

Name	Votes	Percent	Outcome
Christopher B. Shank, Rep.	9,606	99%	Won
Other Write-Ins	101	1.0%	Lost

- 2002 race for Maryland House of Delegates – District 2B

Voters to choose one:

Name	Votes	Percent	Outcome
Christopher B. Shank, Rep.	7,749	72.33%	Won
David M. Russo	2,954	27.57%	Lost
Other Write-Ins	11	0.10%	Lost

- 1998 race for Maryland House of Delegates – District 2B

Voters to choose one:

Name	Votes	Percent	Outcome
Christopher B. Shank, Rep.	4,873	51%	Won
D. Bruce Poole	4,626	49%	Lost
