= Maryland House of Delegates District 2A =

American legislative district

Maryland's legislative district 2A
- Represents parts of Washington County and Frederick County
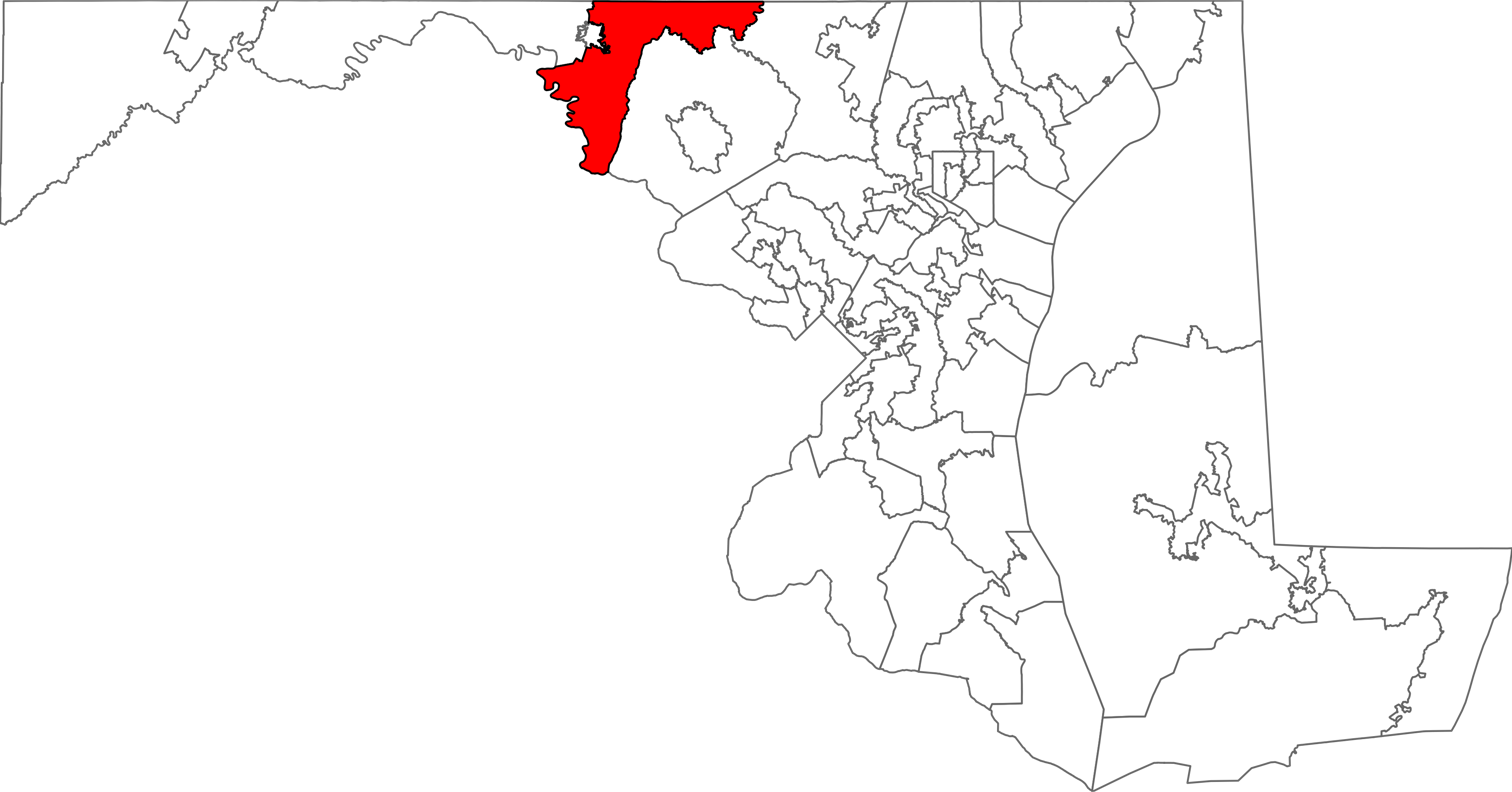
- Delegate(s): William Valentine (R); William J. Wivell (R)
- Registration: 48.2% Republican; 30.2% Democratic; 20.2% unaffiliated
- Demographics: 79.6% White; 9.2% Black/African American; 0.3% Native American; 2.1% Asian; 0.0% Hawaiian/Pacific Islander; 2.6% Other race; 6.2% Two or more races; 5.9% Hispanic
- Population (2020): 91,587
- Voting-age population: 73,136
- Registered voters: 60,615

Maryland House of Delegates District 2A is one of the 71 districts that compose the Maryland House of Delegates. Along with subdistrict 2B, it makes up the 2nd district of the Maryland Senate. District 2A includes parts of Washington and Frederick County, and is represented by two delegates.

== History ==
The constituency of District 2A was part of Washington County up until the 2020 United States redistricting cycle when its constituency expanded to include parts of Washington County and Frederick County.

== Demographic characteristics ==
As of the 2020 United States census, the district had a population of 91,587, of whom 73,136 (79.9%) were of voting age. The racial makeup of the district was 72,911 (79.6%) White, 8,386 (9.2%) African American, 262 (0.3%) Native American, 1,884 (2.1%) Asian, 25 (0.0%) Pacific Islander, 2,392 (2.6%) from some other race, and 5,700 (6.2%) from two or more races. Hispanic or Latino of any race were 5,444 (5.9%) of the population.

The district had 60,615 registered voters as of October 17, 2020, of whom 12,218 (20.2%) were registered as unaffiliated, 29,230 (48.2%) were registered as Republicans, 18,279 (30.2%) were registered as Democrats, and 496 (0.8%) were registered to other parties.

== Past Election Results ==
=== 1982 ===
Name	Party	Outcome
Casper R. Taylor Jr.	Democratic	Won

=== 1998 ===
Name	Party	Votes	Percent	Outcome
Robert A. McKee	Republican	8,198	100.0%	Won

=== 2002 ===
Name	Party	Votes	Percent	Outcome
Robert A. McKee	Republican	10,223	74.7%	Won
Peter E. Perini Sr.	Democratic	3,447	25.2%	Lost
Other Write-Ins		21	0.2%	

=== 2006 ===
Name	Party	Votes	Percent	Outcome
Robert A. McKee	Republican	11,676	99.2%	Won
Other Write-Ins		94	0.8%	

=== 2010 ===
Name	Party	Votes	Percent	Outcome
Andrew A. Serafini	Republican	9,754	71.0%	Won
Neil Becker	Democratic	3,957	28.8%	Lost
Other Write-Ins		27	0.2%	

=== 2014 ===
Name	Party	Votes	Percent	Outcome
Neil C. Parrott	Republican	17,599	36.0%	Won
Andrew A. Serafini	Republican	17,528	35.9%	Won
Elizabeth Paul	Democratic	8,279	16.9%	Lost
Charles Bailey	Democratic	5,419	11.1%	Lost
Other Write-Ins		22	0.0%	

=== 2018 ===
Name	Party	Votes	Percent	Outcome
Neil C. Parrott	Republican	22,422	40.0%	Won
William J. Wivell	Republican	19,453	34.7%	Won
Andrew J. Barnhart	Green	7,371	13.1%	Lost
Charlotte McBrearty	Green	6,683	11.9%	Lost
Other Write-Ins		141	0.3%	

=== 2022 ===
While two-term Republican incumbent William J. Wivell ran for a third term, two-term Republican incumbent Neil Parrott, announced on November 17, 2021, that he would run for Congress in Maryland's 6th congressional district instead of running for a third term.

Republican primary results
Party	Candidate	Votes	%
Republican	William J. Wivell (incumbent)	5,751	42.9
Republican	William Valentine	3,069	22.9
Republican	Seth Edward Wilson	2,340	17.5
Republican	Bradley Belmont	2,235	16.7

Results by precinct Republicans: 80–90%; >90%; Write-ins: 50–60%

General election results
Party	Candidate	Votes	%
Republican	William Valentine	19,839	49.59%
Republican	William J. Wivell (incumbent)	19,458	48.64%
Write-in		711	1.78%
Total votes		40,008	100.00%
Republican hold			
Republican hold			
