= Maryland House of Delegates District 2B =

American legislative district

Maryland's legislative district 2B
- Represents part of Washington County
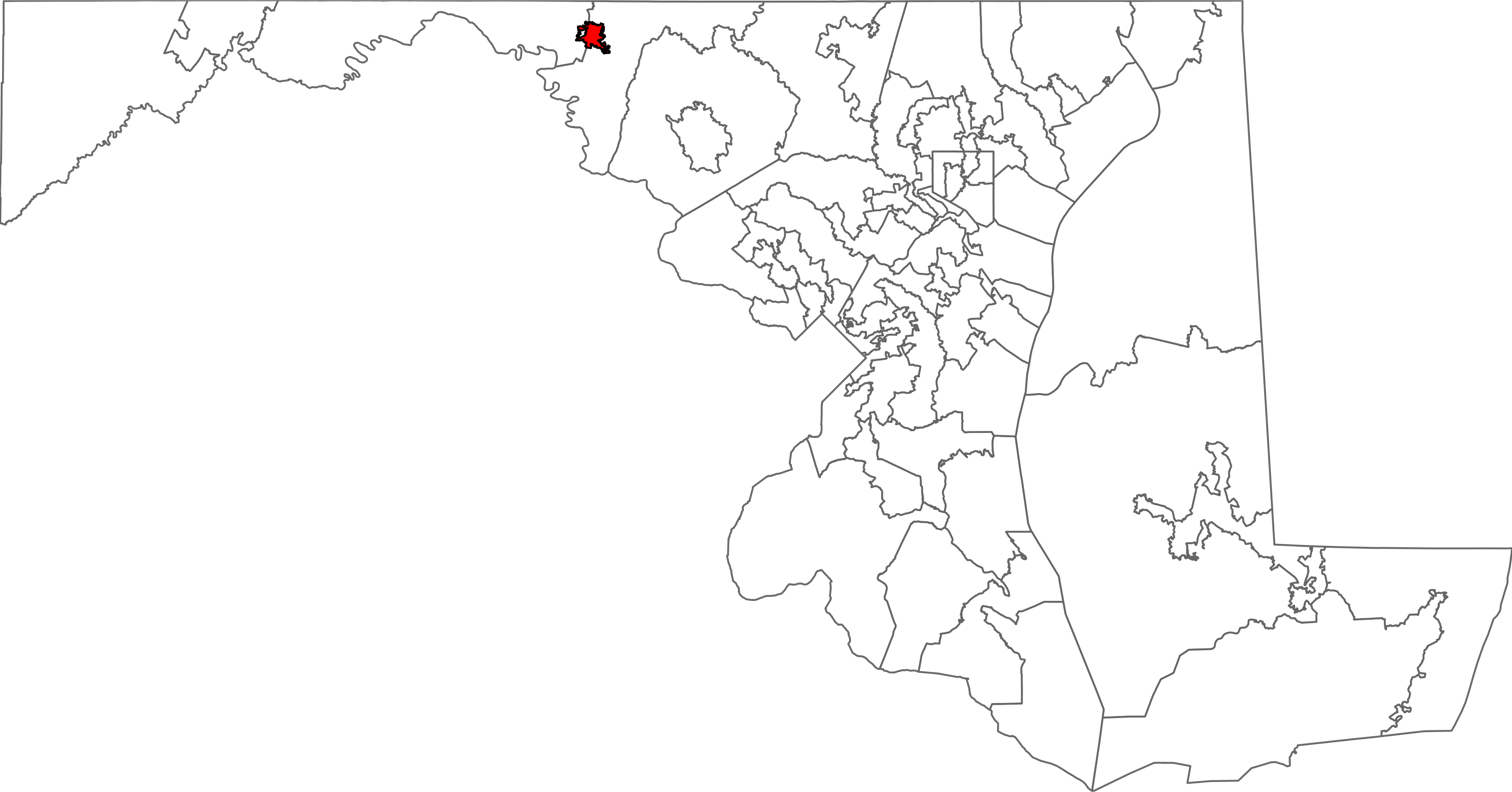
- Delegate(s): Matthew Schindler (D)
- Registration: 45.4% Democratic; 29.4% Republican; 23.2% unaffiliated
- Demographics: 62.2% White; 20.0% Black/African American; 0.4% Native American; 2.3% Asian; 0.0% Hawaiian/Pacific Islander; 4.5% Other race; 10.6% Two or more races; 9.8% Hispanic
- Population (2020): 44,417
- Voting-age population: 33,244
- Registered voters: 25,649

Maryland House of Delegates District 2B is one of the 71 districts that compose the Maryland House of Delegates. Along with subdistrict 2A, it makes up the 2nd district of the Maryland Senate. District 2B includes part of Washington County, notably Hagerstown and is represented by one delegate.

== Demographic characteristics ==
As of the 2020 United States census, the district had a population of 44,417, of whom 33,244 (74.8%) were of voting age. The racial makeup of the district was 27,619 (62.2%) White, 8,891 (20.0%) African American, 159 (0.4%) Native American, 1,011 (2.3%) Asian, 17 (0.0%) Pacific Islander, 2,000 (4.5%) from some other race, and 4,710 (10.6%) from two or more races. Hispanic or Latino of any race were 4,341 (9.8%) of the population.

The district had 25,649 registered voters as of October 17, 2020, of whom 5,954 (23.2%) were registered as unaffiliated, 7,538 (29.4%) were registered as Republicans, 11,636 (45.4%) were registered as Democrats, and 291 (1.1%) were registered to other parties.

== Past Election Results ==
=== 1982 ===
| Name | Party | Outcome |
|---|---|---|
| Peter G. Callas | Democratic | Won |
| W. Keller Nigh | Republican | Lost |

=== 1986 ===
| Name | Party | Votes | Percent | Outcome |
|---|---|---|---|---|
| Peter G. Callas | Democratic | 5,339 | 72.0% | Won |
| Richard D. Wiles | Republican | 2,103 | 28.0% | Lost |

=== 1990 ===
| Name | Party | Votes | Percent | Outcome |
|---|---|---|---|---|
| Peter G. Callas | Democratic | 4,892 | 100.0% | Won |

=== 1994 ===
| Name | Party | Votes | Percent | Outcome |
|---|---|---|---|---|
| Bruce Poole | 4,219 | 50.0% | Democratic | Won |
| Richard D. Wiles | 4,143 | 50.0% | Republican | Lost |

=== 1998 ===
| Name | Party | Votes | Percent | Outcome |
|---|---|---|---|---|
| Christopher B. Shank | Republican | 4,873 | 51.0% | Won |
| Bruce Poole | Democratic | 4,626 | 49.0% | Lost |

=== 2002 ===
| Name | Party | Votes | Percent | Outcome |
|---|---|---|---|---|
| Christopher B. Shank | Republican | 7,749 | 72.3% | Won |
| David M. Russo | Democratic | 2,954 | 27.6% | Lost |
| Other Write-Ins | | 11 | 0.1% | |

=== 2006 ===
| Name | Party | Votes | Percent | Outcome |
|---|---|---|---|---|
| Christopher B. Shank | Republican | 9,606 | 99.0% | Won |
| Other Write-Ins | | 101 | 1.0% | |

=== 2010 ===
| Name | Party | Votes | Percent | Outcome |
|---|---|---|---|---|
| Neil Parrott | Republican | 7,663 | 61.8% | Won |
| Brien Poffenberger | Democratic | 4,718 | 38.0% | Lost |
| Other Write-Ins | | 22 | 0.2% | |

=== 2014 ===
| Name | Party | Votes | Percent | Outcome |
|---|---|---|---|---|
| Brett Wilson | Republican | 3,846 | 54.3% | Won |
| John P. Donoghue | Democratic | 3,232 | 45.6% | Lost |
| Other Write-Ins | | 7 | 0.1% | |

=== 2018 ===
| Name | Party | Votes | Percent | Outcome |
|---|---|---|---|---|
| Paul D. Corderman | Republican | 5,457 | 51.9% | Won |
| Peter E. Perini Sr. | Democratic | 5,028 | 47.8% | Lost |
| Other Write-Ins | | 25 | 0.2% | |

=== District 2B ===
The new District 2B encompasses the city of Hagerstown in Washington County. Republican incumbent Brenda J. Thiam was running for a full term after being appointed to the seat on October 6, 2020, following the appointment of Paul D. Corderman, to the Maryland Senate.

Republican primary results by precinct Thiam: 50–60%; 60–70%; >90%; Stolz: 50–60%; 60–70%; >90%

Republican primary results
| Party | Candidate | Votes | % |
|---|---|---|---|
| Republican | Brenda J. Thiam (incumbent) | 916 | 54.2 |
| Republican | Thomas Stolz | 773 | 45.8 |

Democratic primary results by precinct Grossman: 50–60%; 60–70%; >90%; Robinson: 60–70%; Tie

Democratic primary results
| Party | Candidate | Votes | % |
|---|---|---|---|
| Democratic | Brooke Grossman | 1,167 | 61.3 |
| Democratic | Ladetra Robinson | 738 | 38.7 |

Results by precinct Grossman: 50–60%; 60–70%; 70–80%; Thiam: 50–60%

2022 Maryland's 2B House of Delegates district election
| Party | Candidate | Votes | % |
|---|---|---|---|
| Democratic | Brooke Grossman | 5,001 | 54.15% |
| Republican | Brenda J. Thiam (incumbent) | 4,222 | 45.72% |
| Write-in | | 12 | 0.13% |
| Total votes | | 9,235 | 100.00% |
| Democratic gain from Republican | | | |
