= Yvette Lewis (politician) =

American political executive and activist

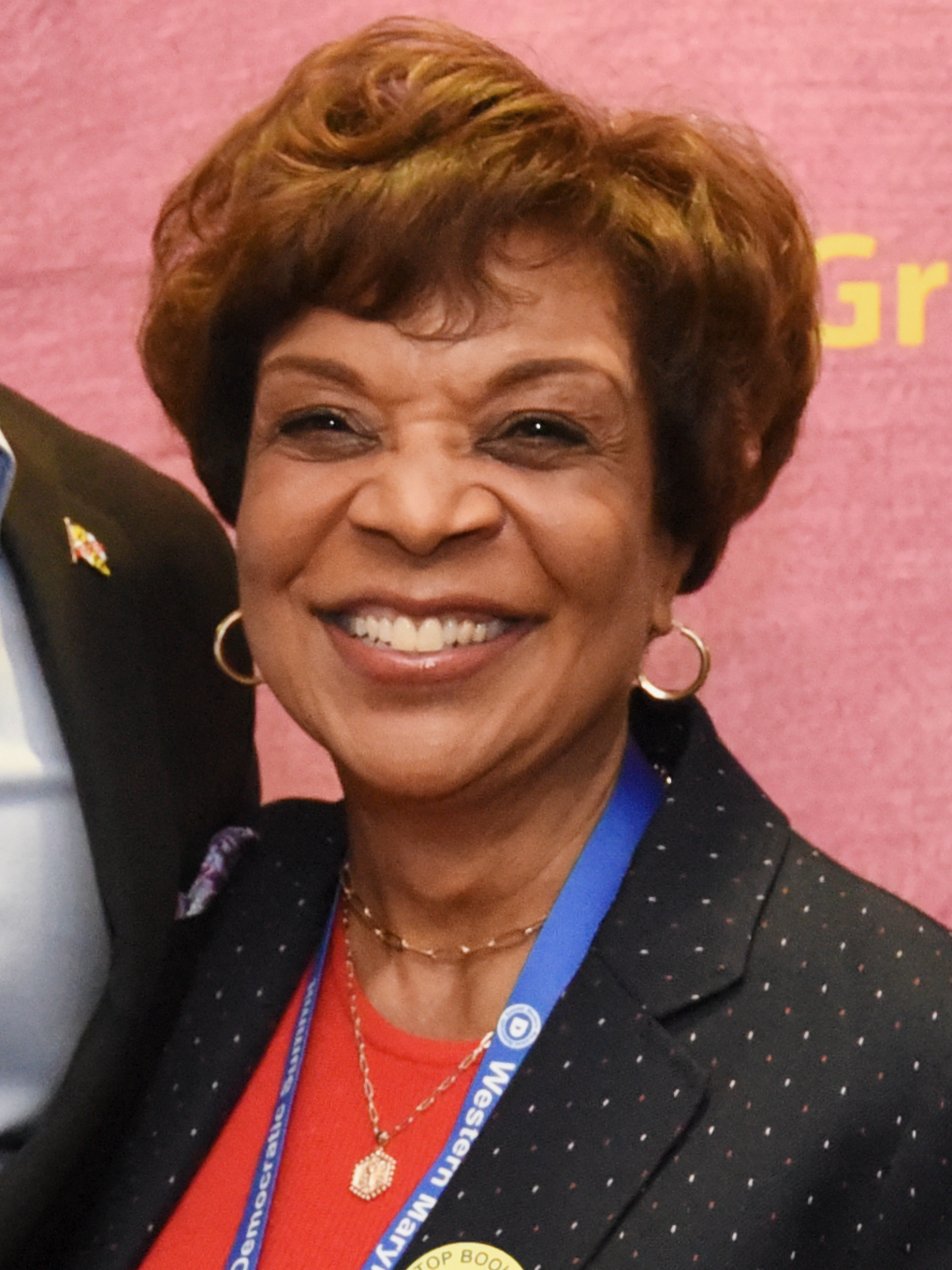
- Lewis in 2023

Chair of the Maryland Democratic Party
- In office December 7, 2019 – October 6, 2023
- Preceded by: Cory V. McCray (acting)
- Succeeded by: Everett Browning (acting)
- In office May 13, 2011 – April 3, 2015
- Preceded by: Peter O'Malley
- Succeeded by: Bruce Poole

Personal details
- Born: 1952 or 1953 (age 73–74)
- Party: Democratic
- Education: Howard University (BM)

Yvette Lewis (born 1952/1953) is an American political executive and activist who served as the chair of the Maryland Democratic Party from 2011 to 2015 and 2019 to 2023.

== Life ==
Lewis is a professional opera singer and lives in Bowie, Maryland. She served as chair of the Maryland Democratic Party from 2011 to 2015. She was a superdelegate at the 2016 Democratic National Convention. She reassumed her role as party chair in December 2019, succeeding acting chair Cory V. McCray, and served until October 6, 2023. Lewis was succeeded by acting chair Everett Browning.

Party political offices
Preceded by Peter O'Malley	Chair of the Maryland Democratic Party; 2011–2015	Succeeded by Bruce Poole
Preceded by Cory V. McCray; Acting	Chair of the Maryland Democratic Party; 2019–2023	Succeeded by Everett Browning; Acting
