= Neil Parrott =

American politician (born 1970)

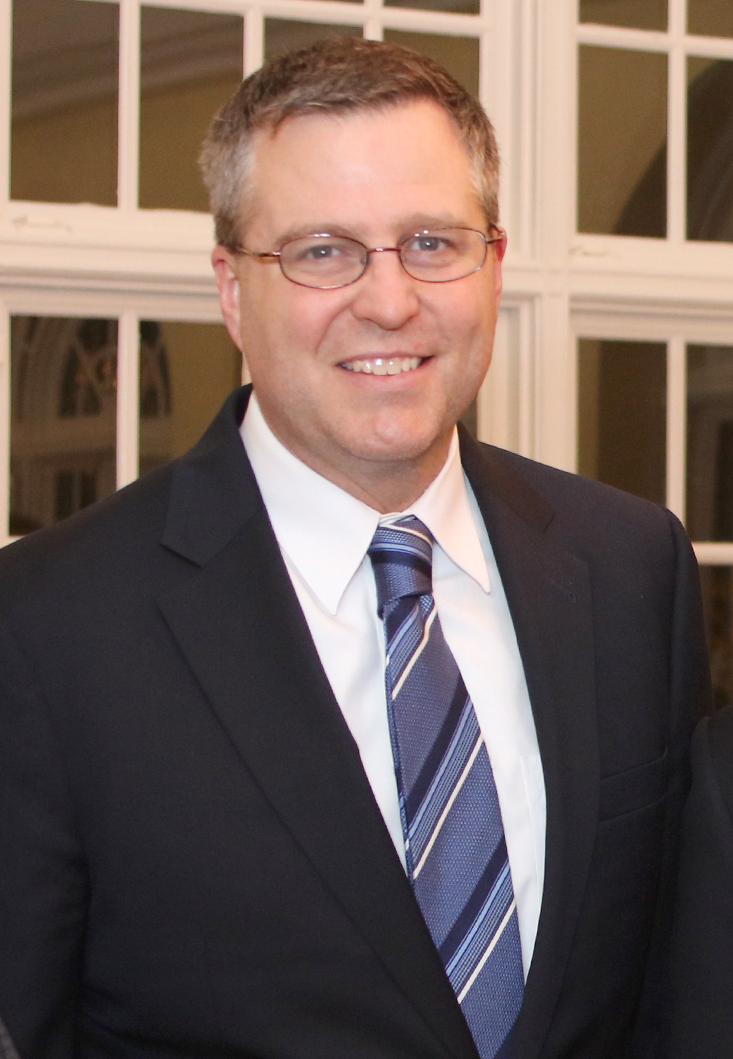
- Parrott in 2017

Member of the Washington County Board of County Commissioners
- Incumbent
- Assumed office April 21, 2026
- Appointed by: Wes Moore
- Preceded by: Derek Harvey

Member of the Maryland House of Delegates
- In office January 12, 2011 – January 11, 2023
- Preceded by: Christopher B. Shank (2B); Andrew A. Serafini (2A)
- Succeeded by: Brett Wilson (2B); William Valentine (2A)
- Constituency: District 2B (2011–2015); District 2A (2015–2023)

Personal details
- Born: Neil Conrad Parrott; July 30, 1970 (age 56) Bethesda, Maryland, U.S.
- Party: Republican
- Spouse: April Wise (m. 1999)
- Children: 3
- Education: University of Maryland, College Park (BS); Mount St. Mary's University (MBA)

Neil Conrad Parrott (born July 30, 1970) is an American politician who has served as a member of the Washington County Board of County Commissioners since 2026. A member of the Republican Party, he was a member of the Maryland House of Delegates from 2011 to 2023.

Born and raised in Maryland, Parrott graduated from the University of Maryland, College Park and Mount St. Mary's University. He began his career as a traffic engineer for the Maryland State Highway Administration and the city of Frederick, Maryland. Parrott first became involved in politics in 2002 and was elected as a Republican to the Maryland House of Delegates in 2010, first representing District 2B from 2011 to 2015 and then District 2A until 2023. During his tenure, Parrott organized efforts petitioning against laws passed by the Maryland General Assembly to legalize same-sex marriage and extend in-state tuition to undocumented students, which were upheld by voters.

Parrott ran for the U.S. House of Representatives in Maryland's 6th congressional district in 2020 and 2022, losing both times to incumbent Democrat David Trone. He ran for the 6th district for a third time in 2024, in which he was defeated by Democratic nominee April McClain Delaney in the general election.

== Background ==
Born in Bethesda, Maryland, Parrott graduated from Old Mill High School in 1988. He went on to the University of Maryland, College Park where he graduated with a Bachelor of Science degree in civil engineering in 1994. He later attended graduate school and in 2006 graduated from Mount Saint Mary's University with a Master of Business Administration.

Parrott began his career at the Maryland State Highway Administration where he was a traffic engineer. He went on from there to become the Deputy Director of Engineering in the Frederick, Maryland Department of Public Works, where he helped hire a new traffic engineer for the city and purchase the extension of new sidewalk along the Golden Mile section of U.S. Route 40. Parrott and his wife moved to Middletown, Maryland in 1999, where he started a consulting company, Traffic Solutions Inc., in 2007.

== Political career ==
Parrott first got involved with politics in 2002, successfully suing the American Civil Liberties Union over the removal of a monument for the Ten Commandments in a public park in Frederick, Maryland. In April 2009, he got involved with the Tea Party movement, organizing bus trips to Washington, D.C. to protest the Affordable Care Act. In July 2009, Parrott filed to run for the Maryland House of Delegates in District 2B.

=== Maryland House of Delegates ===
Parrott was sworn in as a member of the Maryland House of Delegates on January 12, 2011, representing District 2B. He was redrawn into District 2A during the 2010 redistricting cycle.

In February 2013, Parrott was one of three House members who voted against reprimanding state delegate Tony McConkey, who failed to disclose a conflict of interest when pushing for legislation that would have allowed him to regain his suspended real estate license.

In January 2015, Parrott said he would apply to fill a vacancy in the Maryland Senate left by the resignation of Christopher B. Shank. State delegate Andrew A. Serafini was ultimately appointed to the seat and sworn in on February 2, 2015.

==== Committee assignments ====
- Member, Judiciary Committee, 2011–2018 (estates & trusts subcommittee, 2011–2014; juvenile law subcommittee, 2015–2018)
- Assistant Minority Whip, 2015–2021
- Member, Environment and Transportation Committee, 2019–2023 (housing & real property subcommittee, 2019–2023; motor vehicle & transportation subcommittee, 2019–2023)

=== MDPetitions.com ===
In July 2012, Parrott founded an organization, MDPetitions.com, and started an accompanying website to coordinate efforts to petition laws he opposed to be placed on ballot initiatives. In an interview with The Baltimore Sun, he said he started the website with the goal of "taming the Democratic establishment so it wouldn't pass legislation that most Marylanders oppose".

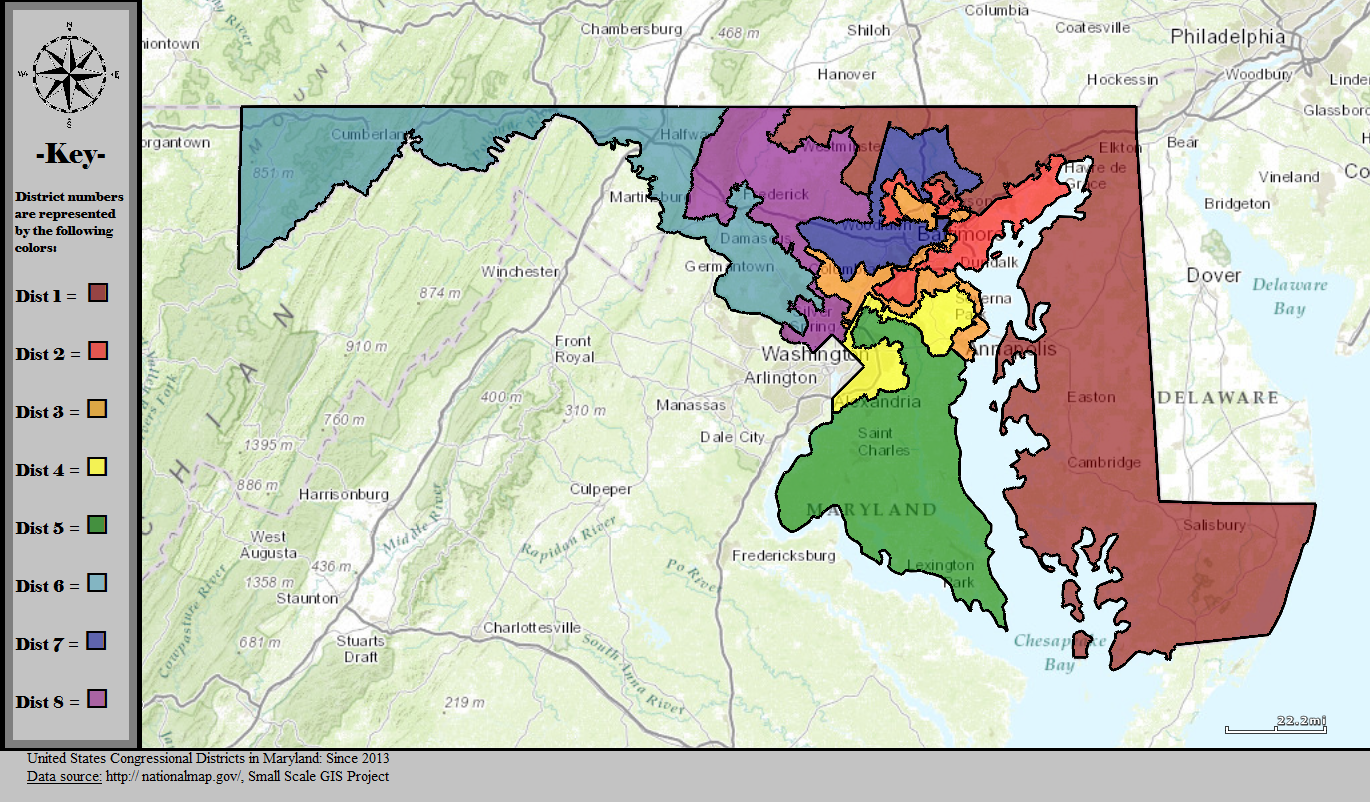
Maryland's congressional districts from 2013 to 2023, which Parrott sought to overturn in 2012

That year, Parrott successfully placed ballot initiatives for three laws–the legalization of same-sex marriage, offering in-state tuition to undocumented immigrants, and the state's congressional redistricting map. These petitions, despite being rejected by voters, earned Parrott the Maryland Republican Party Man of the Year award.

In April 2013, Parrott said he would not seek a ballot referendum against a law banning assault weapons and requiring licenses to buy handguns, which he had likened to a poll tax, instead backing a lawsuit from the National Rifle Association against the law.

In 2014, Parrott again sought to place two referendums seeking to repeal legislation on the ballot–a 2013 bill abolishing the death penalty, and a 2014 bill prohibiting discrimination against transgender Marylanders in housing and employment, nicknamed the "Bathroom Bill" by its detractors. However, both petition attempts fell short of the 55,736 signature threshold to get on the ballot.

=== Redistricting lawsuits ===
In March 2013, Parrott joined a Judicial Watch lawsuit that sought to overturn the results of the 2012 redistricting referendum, asking the courts to hold a new election using different ballot language.

In June 2015, Parrott joined another Judicial Watch lawsuit against Maryland's congressional districts, claiming that the state's redistricting plan was unconstitutional.

In November 2021, ahead of the special legislative session to pass the newly drawn redistricting maps, Parrott said he supported the maps drawn by Governor Larry Hogan's Maryland Citizens Redistricting Commission (MCRC). He had participated in the MCRC's public hearing process, during which he advocated for adopting single-member legislative districts. In December 2021, Parrott and Judicial Watch filed a lawsuit that sought to repeal the state's newly redrawn congressional map, which he described as a "political gerrymander". The new map would have likely protected incumbent Democratic U.S. Representatives and gave Democrats a realistic chance of defeating U.S. Representative Andy Harris, the lone Republican in Maryland's congressional delegation, by adding more Democratic voters to his district. In March 2022, Circuit Court Judge Lynne A. Battaglia ruled for Parrott, striking down the congressional maps that she called a "product of extreme partisan gerrymandering". The Maryland General Assembly passed a new redistricting plan shortly after the ruling, during which Parrott introduced an amendment to swap out the new map with the MCRC-drawn map. The amendment was rejected by a 42-92 vote.

=== Congressional campaigns ===
==== 2020 ====
On November 22, 2019, Parrott announced that he would run for the U.S. House of Representatives in Maryland's 6th congressional district, challenging incumbent Democratic U.S. Representative David Trone.

Parrott was defeated by Trone in the general election on November 4, 2020, receiving 39 percent of the vote to Trone's 58 percent.

==== 2022 ====
Immediately following his defeat in 2020, Parrott filed to run for the U.S. House of Representatives in Maryland's 6th congressional district, again challenging Trone. He announced his candidacy on November 17, 2021. Parrott defeated Washington Free Beacon journalist Matthew Foldi in the Republican primary election on July 19, 2022.

During the general election, Parrott was heavily outspent by Trone, who had had a 14-1 cash-on-hand advantage and spent $12 million to self-fund his campaign. Despite this, he had received more individual contributions from Maryland. The National Republican Congressional Committee targeted the district, which was redrawn to be almost evenly divided between Democratic and Republican voters. The district was also described as the only competitive district in Maryland, with The Economist giving Parrott a 53 percent chance of winning and FiveThirtyEight rating it as "highly competitive".

Parrott was defeated by Trone in the general election on November 8, 2022. He conceded to Trone on November 11. Political analysts, including Goucher College's Mileah Kromer, saw Trone's ability to self-fund and controversial Republican gubernatorial nominee Dan Cox as factors that led to Parrott's defeat. Following his defeat, he called on the Maryland Republican Party to embrace mail-in voting.

==== 2024 ====
On June 27, 2023, Parrott formed an exploratory committee to explore a potential third run for the district in 2024, seeking to succeed U.S. Representative David Trone, who ran for U.S. Senate in 2024. He officially entered the race on February 9, 2024, hours before the candidate filing deadline. Parrott was seen as a frontrunner, alongside former state delegate and 2022 gubernatorial nominee Dan Cox, in the Republican primary, during which Parrott ran on a platform including securing the border, increasing fracking, tough-on-crime policies, and widening local highways.

Parrott won the Republican primary election on May 14, 2024, and faced April McClain Delaney in the general election. Parrott positioned himself as someone who lives and has raised a family in the district, contrasting himself with McClain Delaney, who lives in Potomac, Maryland. He also campaigned on the issues of transportation, immigration, and the economy, and pledged to join the Freedom Caucus if elected to Congress. Parrott was defeated by McClain Delaney on November 5, 2024; he conceded the election to McClain Delaney on November 14. The election for the 6th district was the most competitive in the state. Parrott would have been the first member of Congress from one of Maryland's three panhandle counties since J. Glenn Beall Jr., who represented the 6th district from 1969 to 1971, had he won the race.

=== Post-legislative career ===
In January 2025, Parrott formed an exploratory committee to explore a fourth consecutive run for the district in 2026, seeking to challenge U.S. Representative April McClain Delaney. He ultimately decided against running a fourth consecutive campaign for Congress.

In February 2026, following the resignation of Washington County commissioner Derek Harvey, Parrott applied to fill the remainder of Harvey's term on the Washington County Board of Commissioners. The Washington County Republican Central Committee voted to nominate Parrott to the seat in March 2026. Parrott's nomination was sent to Governor Wes Moore, who appointed Parrott to the board of county commissioners on March 26, and sent his nomination to the Senate Executive Nominations Committee for approval. The Senate confirmed Parrott's appointment on April 8. He was sworn in April 21, 2026.

== Political positions ==
=== Abortion ===
Parrott has described himself as "pro-life". During the 2011 legislative session, he introduced a bill to establish a right to life for all humans that starts "from the beginning of their biological development". During the 2013 legislative session, Parrott introduced a bill that would ban abortions past 20 weeks, with exceptions for medical emergencies. The bill failed to pass out of committee. During his 2022 run for congress, Parrott said he would support a federal 15-week ban on abortions.

During the 2015 legislative session, Parrott opposed a bill requiring insurance companies to cover in vitro fertilisation (IVF) treatments for same-sex married couples, writing in an email to his constituents that the bill would increase premium costs and would be harmful to children who were born into families with two mothers. He also testified against the bill on the House floor, during which he argued that children born into families with a mother and a father were more likely to succeed economically and socially, that the bill would "intentionally put a child into a family where the father will knowingly be absent", and suggested that legislators would eventually pass a bill requiring insurance companies to cover the cost of hiring a surrogate to carry a child for same-sex married men. During his 2024 congressional campaign, Parrott said that he supported IVF and addressed his concerns about the bill's financial impact, but did not address his comments about its effect to children raised by same-sex married couples.

In 2017, Parrott said he opposed a bill that would provide state funding to abortion services providers. In November 2019, he said he supported a federal ban on abortion funding and codifying the Mexico City Policy. In May 2022, Parrott promoted a petition that sought to create a ballot referendum to repeal the Abortion Care Access Act, a bill that would provide $3.5 million to expand who could provide abortion services.

During the 2019 legislative session, Parrott opposed proposals to create a ballot referendum on the right to abortion access. In June 2022, Parrott celebrated the U.S. Supreme Court's ruling in Dobbs v. Jackson Women's Health Organization, calling it a "great decision". In February 2024, he urged voters to vote against 2024 Maryland Question 1 to codify abortion rights into the Maryland Constitution and criticized federal legislation to restore the Roe v. Wade decision.

In 2020, Parrott introduced a bill that would require minors to receive parental consent to get an intrauterine device (IUD).

During his 2024 congressional campaign, Parrott said he supported abortions in cases of rape, incest, and threat of life to the mother, but declined to say if he supported any federal restrictions on abortion, saying that the issue should be decided at the state level.

=== Electoral reform ===
Parrott supports requiring voters to show a government-issued voter ID before casting a ballot in elections.

During the 2012 legislative session, Parrott introduced a bill to make the signatures of proposed ballot referendums private. The bill failed to move out of committee. In 2013, he introduced a bill that would require language used on referendum petitions to match the language used on the ballot. In 2015, Parrott introduced a bill that would delay primary elections if they fall on religious holidays. In May 2015, he said he opposed a bill that would restore voting rights for ex-felons and used his MDPetitions.com organization to forward emails opposing the bill to Governor Larry Hogan, who later vetoed the bill. During the 2021 legislative session, Parrott introduced a bill that would require the Maryland State Board of Elections to verify signatures on mail-in ballots.

During his 2024 congressional campaign, Parrott said he supported proposals that would require Maryland to use an independent redistricting commission to draw its congressional districts, as well as requiring candidates for office live in the districts in which they run. He also supported a constitutional amendment to enact term limits on members of the U.S. House of Representatives and U.S. Senate, but said he would not "term limit myself" if such an amendment does not pass.

=== Fiscal issues ===
In January 2012, Parrott said he opposed a bill levying a sales tax on digital purchases, which he called an "app tax". In March 2020, he said he supported the Tax Cuts and Jobs Act of 2017.

During the 2014 legislative session, Parrott introduced a bill that would allow individual counties to set their own minimum wage rates. The bill was seen as a response to Governor O'Malley's proposal to raise the state minimum wage to $10.10 an hour by 2016. He introduced the bill in 2019 in response to bills that would raise the state minimum wage to $15 an hour by 2026, later unsuccessfully attempting to amend the $15 minimum wage bill to add his county-by-county minimum wage bill.

In February 2017, Parrott voted against a bill that extending the state's energy efficiency program, criticizing its utility bill fee as a "regressive tax". In October 2024, Parrott said he supported the Keystone Pipeline and cutting regulations to increase domestic energy production, and criticized the Biden administration for reducing the amount of federal land that could be used for fracking.

During his 2024 congressional campaign, Parrott supported a balanced budget amendment to the U.S. Constitution. He also supports keeping the Tax Cuts and Jobs Act in place and moving toward a flat tax. Parrott supports cutting regulations to incentivize home construction and requiring federal housing vouchers and tax credits to be conditioned on localities building more housing.

=== Foreign policy ===
In September 2015, Parrott participated in a "Stop the Iran Deal" rally in Washington, D.C.

Parrott criticized the 2020–2021 U.S. troop withdrawal from Afghanistan, claiming that it motivated Russia to begin its invasion of Ukraine. He initially expressed openness to voting for legislation to provide aid to Ukraine amid the invasion, but told The Frederick News-Post in October 2024 that he opposed providing aid to Ukraine, instead advocating for U.S.-led negotiations to peacefully end the war.

Parrott supports the use of military force and intelligence activities to counter Chinese cyberwarfare, as well as providing U.S. military aid to Taiwan and Hong Kong. He also opposed calls for a ceasefire in the Gaza war as well as a two-state solution to the Israeli–Palestinian conflict, and suggested that civilians displaced from the war should seek asylum in Egypt.

=== Gun policy ===
In January 2013, Parrott said he would support Governor Martin O'Malley's bill to require a license to purchase a handgun if the bill also included provisions to expand the right to carry. He also criticized the bill's provisions banning assault rifles and limiting magazine capacities. In 2018, Parrott introduced legislation to adopt the castle doctrine, which would allow homeowners to use deadly force against unlawful intruders.

During the 2020 legislative session and following the 2018 Capital Gazette shooting, Parrott introduced a bill that would restore the death penalty in cases of mass murder. The bill, which was named the Capital Gazette Shooting Memorial Act, was criticized by relatives of victims of the mass shooting. He also said he opposed a bill that would require background checks for long gun purchases.

During his 2024 congressional campaign, Parrott said he believed that gun legislation should be left up to the states, but supported a bill to make concealed carry permits issued in one state valid in all other states.

=== Health care ===
Parrott opposes the Affordable Care Act and has repeatedly called for its repeal.

In May 2020, Parrott joined a lawsuit with state delegates Dan Cox and Warren E. Miller against Governor Larry Hogan's COVID-19 pandemic restrictions, claiming that his orders violated the Free Exercise Clause of the First Amendment to the United States Constitution. In May 2020, the lawsuit was dismissed by U.S. District Judge Catherine C. Blake. Plaintiffs of the lawsuit initially appealed Blake's ruling, but withdrew the lawsuit altogether in July 2020. In November 2021, he criticized COVID-19 vaccine mandates, saying at a campaign rally that people should "have a choice whether they want to get vaccinated against COVID-19".

In November 2020, Parrott said he opposed legalizing medical marijuana, believing that it would lead to the legalization of recreational marijuana, thereby leading to increased traffic accidents.

During his 2024 congressional campaign, Parrott opposed expanding government health care programs and setting limits on prescription drug prices, arguing that pharmaceutical companies needed to be rewarded for their investments before bringing new drugs to the market. He also called for the repeal of the Inflation Reduction Act, but expressed openness to retaining provisions regarding prescription drugs.

=== Immigration ===
In March 2019, Parrott introduced an amendment to the state budget that would require the Maryland Department of Health to confirm an individual's immigration status before granting Medicaid benefits. The amendment was rejected by a 41-98 vote.

During his 2020 congressional campaign, Parrott blamed undocumented immigrants at the Mexico–United States border for the opioid epidemic, and said he would support closing the border. He also said he supported a physical or electronic southern border to stop illegal immigration. During his 2024 congressional campaign, he cited the immigration policy of the Joe Biden administration as the United States' top foreign policy challenge, blaming it for human trafficking and the smuggling of fentanyl and other drugs.

During his 2024 congressional campaign, Parrott said he supported completing the Mexico–United States border wall and reinstating the Remain in Mexico policy. He criticized the Bipartisan Border Security Bill negotiated by Senators James Lankford and Kyrsten Sinema, calling it a "non-starter" and would alllow 5,000 illegal immigrants to cross into the United States daily, and vowed to block federal funding for "sanctuary counties". He also blamed immigrants for high crime rates, economic instability, housing prices in Washington County and promoted misinformation claiming that the Federal Emergency Management Agency's response to hurricanes in North Carolina and the southeastern United States were hindered by the Biden administration of spending FEMA disaster relief funds on housing and food for illegal immigrants. In September 2024, Parrott criticized the Frederick Board of Aldermen's vote to allow undocumented immigrants who reside in the city to vote in local elections.

=== National politics ===
In 2016, Parrott unsuccessfully ran for delegate to the Republican National Convention, pledged to U.S. Senator Ted Cruz. In November 2019, Parrott predicted that the impeachment of Donald Trump would backfire on national Democrats, comparing it to how Republicans backfired from the impeachment of Bill Clinton. He supported President Donald Trump's reelection bid in 2020, participating in a "Trump Bus" rally in September 2020.

Following the 2020 United States presidential election, Parrott traveled to Pennsylvania to observe ballots being counted. Following the 2021 U.S. Capitol attack, he said the majority of attendees at the preceding rally "were simply there to support fair elections", and were unaware "that some people were going to try to take over the rally and make it violent". In July 2022, Parrott said he would have voted against certifying the election results in Pennsylvania and Arizona. In February 2024, he said he opposed removing Donald Trump from the 2024 presidential election ballot under the Fourteenth Amendment, saying that he believed that the January 6 Capitol attack was not an insurrection.

=== Policing ===
During the 2014 legislative session, Parrott introduced a bill that would require law enforcement officers to read individuals their Miranda rights during a traffic stop and search. In 2020, Parrott introduced legislation that would exempt law enforcement officers who live in Maryland but work in other states from taking handgun training.

=== Social issues ===
In January 2005, Parrott participated in a protest in Annapolis against a Baltimore lawsuit that would give gay people the right to marry, where he spoke against the Montgomery County Board of Education for mandating gay marriage and gay sex education. During his tenure in the legislature, Parrott was known as an opponent of LGBT rights, opposing bills to repeal the state's anti-sodomy laws. In 2014, he opposed a bill to ban discrimination against transgender Marylanders in housing and employment, claiming it would "radically change our society and put our families and children at risk". Parrott also introduced a bill that would withhold state funding from colleges that offer gender-neutral housing, which failed to pass out of committee. In 2015, he criticized a bill that would allow transgender people to change their gender marker on their birth certificate without proof of gender-affirming surgery. In 2018, Parrott opposed a bill that would ban conversion therapy, claiming that it violated the First Amendment. In 2020, he expressed disappointment the U.S. Supreme Court's ruling in Bostock v. Clayton County, which held that the Civil Rights Act of 1964 also protected against discrimination on the basis of sexual orientation and gender identity, saying that he believed that Congress should have passed a law addressing the issue instead. During his 2024 congressional campaign, Parrott supported banning transgender minors from using puberty blockers or undergoing gender-affirming surgeries, and prohibiting transgender athletes from competing in women's sports teams.

In March 2005, Parrott wrote a letter to the editor for The Herald-Mail arguing that HIV-positive patients who are given life-saving medication should be tattooed "in a spot covered by a bathing suit" to prevent potential sex partners from becoming unknowingly infected. During his run for the Maryland House of Delegates in 2010, he said he no longer supported the idea, citing advancements made in medicine to treat HIV. Parrott responded similarly to David Trone raising the issue in the 2022 congressional campaign.

During the 2014 legislative session, Parrott voted for an amendment to the state budget that condemned antisemitism amid the American Studies Association's boycott of Israel. In 2020, he voted against a bill to ban placing swastikas and other hate symbols on a person's property without their consent. During his 2024 congressional campaign, Parrott defended his vote on the anti-hate symbols bill, telling Jewish Insider that he had concerns with the bill's interpretation and was worried that the bill would allow property owners to interpret political signage as intimidation. The bill explicitly banned the display of swastikas and nooses, but otherwise interpreted hate symbols as "an item or symbol used to threaten or intimidate a person or a group of persons".

In 2017, Parrott opposed a federal bill that would remove a statue of Robert E. Lee from Antietam National Battlefield, claiming that its sponsors were "progressive Democrats who are trying to erase history".

In 2019, Parrott introduced a legislation that would declare exposure to pornography as a public health crisis. The bill failed to move out of committee.

In November 2019, Parrott said he supported welfare reform.

During the 2020, 2021, and 2022 legislative sessions, Parrott defended a bill that would make spousal rape harder to prosecute. During a floor debate on the bill in February 2022, he claimed that the bill was unnecessary and would criminalize regular physical contact between spouses. After the issue was raised by April McClain Delaney in the 2024 congressional campaign, Parrott defended his vote on the bill by saying that "having workplace sexual harassment laws in marriage doesn't make sense" and blamed Democrats for the bill failing to pass after it was amended in the Maryland Senate. The bill was reintroduced during the 2023 legislative session, during which it passed and was signed into law by Governor Wes Moore.

In October 2021, Parrott supported, but did not sign onto, a pair of letters to West Virginia officials asking about annexation of Western Maryland to West Virginia, citing the state's ban on fracking and the General Assembly "not caring about the needs of Western Maryland".

== Personal life ==
Parrott got engaged to his wife, April (née Wise), in March 1999, and married in July. Together, they have three children, including two daughters and a son. He describes himself as a devout Christian.

In October 2002, Parrott was detained for shoving a police officer after he and his group, Friends of Frederick, were removed from a parade in Frederick, Maryland, for displaying a "Save the Ten Commandments" banner to protest calls for the removal of a Ten Commandments Monument in the Bentz Street Graveyard Memorial Park. Prosecutors declined to file charges against Parrott.

== Electoral history ==
Maryland House of Delegates District 2B Republican primary election, 2010
Party	Candidate	Votes	%
Republican	Neil Parrott	3,199	81.1
Republican	Ted Brennan	744	18.9

Maryland House of Delegates District 2B election, 2010
Party	Candidate	Votes	%
Republican	Neil Parrott	7,663	61.8
Democratic	Brien Poffenberger	4,718	38.0
Write-in		22	0.2

Maryland House of Delegates District 2A Republican primary election, 2014
Party	Candidate	Votes	%
Republican	Neil C. Parrott (incumbent)	5,362	45.8
Republican	Andrew A. Serafini (incumbent)	5,178	44.2
Republican	David C. Hanlin	1,180	10.1

Maryland House of Delegates District 2A election, 2014
Party	Candidate	Votes	%
Republican	Neil C. Parrott (incumbent)	17,599	36.0
Republican	Andrew A. Serafini (incumbent)	17,528	35.9
Democratic	Elizabeth Paul	8,279	16.9
Democratic	Charles Bailey	5,419	11.1
Write-in		22	0.0

Maryland House of Delegates District 2A election, 2018
Party	Candidate	Votes	%
Republican	Neil C. Parrott (incumbent)	22,422	40.0
Republican	William J. Wivell	19,453	34.7
Green	Andrew J. Barnhart	7,371	13.1
Green	Charlotte McBrearty	6,683	11.9
Write-in		141	0.3

Maryland's 6th congressional district Republican primary election, 2020
Party	Candidate	Votes	%
Republican	Neil C. Parrott	28,804	65.2
Republican	Kevin T. Caldwell	11,258	25.5
Republican	Chris P. Meyyur	4,113	9.3

Maryland's 6th congressional district election, 2020
Party	Candidate	Votes	%
Democratic	David Trone (incumbent)	215,540	58.8
Republican	Neil C. Parrott	143,599	39.2
Green	George Gluck	6,893	1.9
Write-in		402	0.1

Maryland's 6th congressional district Republican primary election, 2022
Party	Candidate	Votes	%
Republican	Neil C. Parrott	31,665	62.6
Republican	Matthew Foldi	7,497	14.8
Republican	Mariela Roca	3,858	7.6
Republican	Colt M. Black	3,789	7.5
Republican	Jonathan Jenkins	3,406	6.7
Republican	Robert Poissonnier	400	0.8

Maryland's 6th congressional district election, 2022
Party	Candidate	Votes	%
Democratic	David Trone (incumbent)	140,295	54.7
Republican	Neil C. Parrott	115,771	45.2
Write-in		332	0.1

Maryland's 6th congressional district Republican primary results, 2024
Party	Candidate	Votes	%
Republican	Neil Parrott	22,604	45.9
Republican	Dan Cox	14,797	30.1
Republican	Mariela Roca	6,071	12.3
Republican	Tom Royals	2,060	4.2
Republican	Chris Hyser	1,625	3.3
Republican	Brenda Thiam	1,607	3.3
Republican	Todd Puglisi (withdrawn)	446	0.9

Maryland's 6th congressional district election, 2024
Party	Candidate	Votes	%	±%
Democratic	April McClain Delaney	199,788	53.05%	−1.67%
Republican	Neil Parrott	175,974	46.72%	+1.57%
Write-in		862	0.23%	+0.10%
Total votes		376,624	100.00%	

Maryland House of Delegates
Preceded by Christopher B. Shank	Member of the Maryland House of Delegates from the 2B district 2011–2015	Succeeded by Brett Wilson
Preceded by Andrew A. Serafini	Member of the Maryland House of Delegates from the 2A district 2015–2023	Succeeded by William Valentine
