= Donald F. Munson =

American politician

Member of the Maryland Senate from the 2nd district
- In office January 1991 – January 2011
- Preceded by: Victor Cushwa
- Succeeded by: Christopher B. Shank

Member of the Maryland House of Delegates from the 2C district
- In office January 1975 – January 1991
- Succeeded by: John P. Donoghue

Personal details
- Born: Donald Francis Munson; December 21, 1937 (age 88) Hagerstown, Maryland
- Party: Republican

Donald F. Munson (born December 21, 1937) is a former Maryland State Senator who represented district 2 (Washington County). He was defeated in both a primary and general election in 2010 by Delegate Christopher B. Shank.

== Background ==
Donald F. Munson is an American politician from the state of Maryland. He started his political career in 1975 when he won the seat in the House of Delegates for district 2C, representing part of Washington County. He won reelection three times before running for the seat in the State Senate in 1990 where he handily defeated Democrat Patricia K. Cushwa, who finished her late husband's term, with 64% of the vote.

In 1994, Munson won reelection against Democratic challenger Laura J. Wright, winning with 82% of the vote. In 1998, Munson went unchallenged, receiving 100% of the vote. Mary Newby challenged him in 2002, yet only received 29% of the vote to Munson's 70%. In 2006 Munson won re-election with 98.9% of the vote.

On September 14, 2010, Munson was defeated in the Republican primary election by state delegate Chris Shank. Munson received 42.95% of the vote, compared to 57.05% received by Delegate Shank.

== Education ==
Munson attended Washington County Public Schools while growing up in Washington County. After high school, he graduated from the Johns Hopkins University with a B.A. in mathematics in 1968.

== Career ==
Munson got his first taste of politics in 1953 when he became a legislative page for U.S. Representative DeWitt S. Hyde. He also served in the United States Army Reserves. In his community, he is active in many organizations including the Washington County Republican Club , the Washington County Historical Society , Washington County Association for Retarded Citizens, the Antietam Exchange Club, the North American Rod & Gun Club , and the Alsatia Club.

Munson has won numerous awards, including the Legislator of the Year from the Maryland Retailers Association in 2003, the Outstanding Rural Legislator Award from the Rural Maryland Council in 2004, and the John Otho Marsh Jr. Public Service Award from Shenandoah University in 2004.

As a member of the Maryland Senate, Munson serves on numerous committees, including the Budget and Taxation Committee, the Joint Committee on Federal Relations, the Rules Committee, the Joint Committee on Legislative Ethics, and the Joint Commission on the Maryland Port Administration, to name a few.

=== 2010 legislative session ===
During the 2010 legislative session, Munson was a sponsor of the Correctional Officers Bill of Rights, SB 887. This bill

- Provides for specified rights of a State correctional officer relating to employment, investigation, and discipline under specified circumstances.
- Provides for the procedures for the investigation or interrogation of a State correctional officers
- Establishes procedures for an application for a show cause order under specified circumstances.
- Establishes a specified limitation on administrative charges against a State correctional officer.

Voters to choose one:

Name	Votes	Percent	Outcome
Donald F. Munson, Rep.	28,900	98.9%	Won
Write-ins	320	1.1%	Lost

- 2002 election for Maryland State Senate – 2nd District

Voters to choose one:

Name	Votes	Percent	Outcome
Donald F. Munson, Rep.	23,640	70.53%	Won
Mary E. Newby, Dem.	9,859	29.42%	Lost

- 1998 election for Maryland State Senate – 2nd District

Voters to choose one:

Name	Votes	Percent	Outcome
Donald F. Munson, Rep.	22,347	100%	Won
Unopposed			

- 1994 election for Maryland State Senate – 2nd District

Voters to choose one:

Name	Votes	Percent	Outcome
Donald F. Munson, Rep.	20,242	82%	Won
Laura J. Wright, Dem.	4,535	18%	Lost

- 1990 election for Maryland State Senate – 2nd District

Voters to choose one:

Name	Votes	Percent	Outcome
Donald F. Munson, Rep.	13,371	64%	Won
Patricia K. Cushwa, Dem.	7,477	36%	Lost

- 1986 election for Maryland House of Delegates – District 2C

Voters to choose one:

Name	Votes	Percent	Outcome
Donald F. Munson, Rep.	4,303	100%	Won
Unopposed			
