= William Valentine (politician) =

American politician

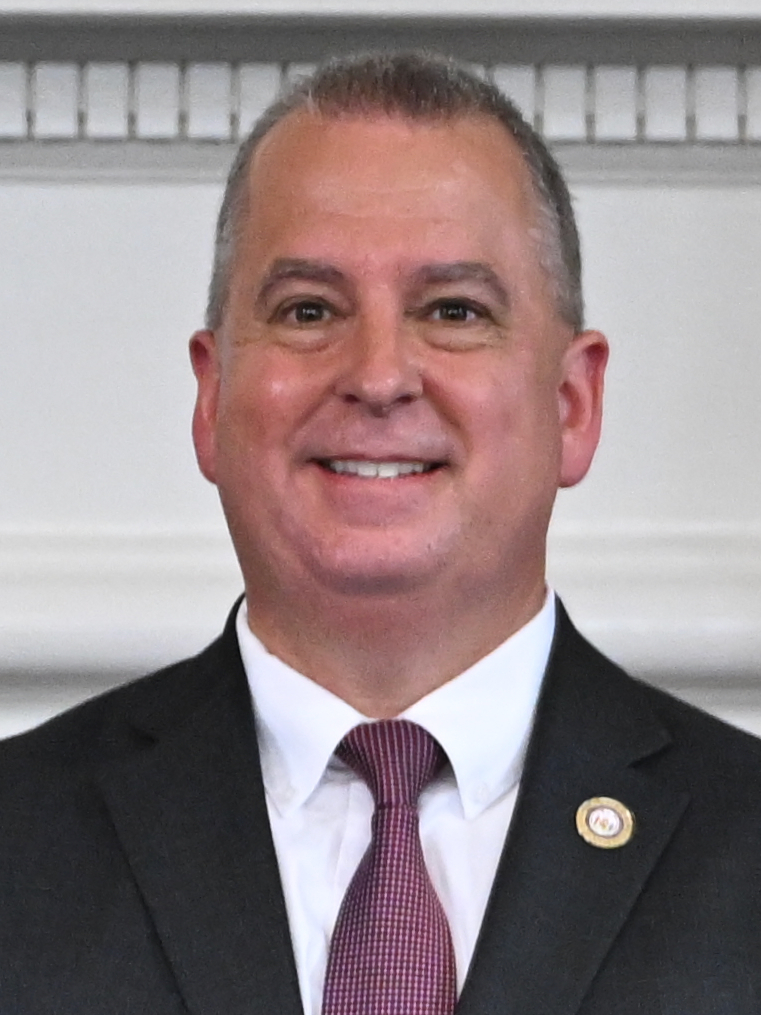
- Valentine in 2025

Member of the Maryland House of Delegates from the 2A district
- Incumbent
- Assumed office January 11, 2023 Serving with William J. Wivell
- Preceded by: Neil Parrott

Personal details
- Born: William M. Valentine; 1971 (age 54–55) Gettysburg, Pennsylvania, U.S.
- Party: Republican
- Children: 2
- Profession: Retired police officer

William M. Valentine (born 1971) is an American politician. He is a member for the Maryland House of Delegates in District 2A in Washington and Frederick counties. He was previously a candidate for the Frederick County Council in 2018.

== Background ==
Valentine graduated from Delone Catholic High School in 1989. He later attended Frederick Community College, where he earned an Bachelor's degree in criminal justice in 1991. He is a retired police officer, working as a police officer in Thurmont, Maryland from 1994 to 1998, and again from 2003 to 2005, in between working as a deputy sheriff in Garrett County, Maryland, and retiring as a lieutenant in the Westminster Police Department in 2019. Prior to serving in the legislature, he worked as an investigator with the Frederick County State's Attorney's office.

In 2022, Valentine ran for the Maryland House of Delegates in District 4, seeking to succeed outgoing state Delegate Dan Cox, who unsuccessfully ran for governor in 2022. He was later redrawn into District 2A. He won the Republican primary election with 22.9 percent of the vote, placing second behind incumbent state delegate William J. Wivell. He faced no formal opposition in the general election.

== In the legislature ==
Valentine was sworn into the Maryland House of Delegates on January 11, 2023. He is a member of the House Judiciary Committee.

== Political positions ==
During his 2022 House of Delegates campaign, Valentine ran on a platform that included advocating for limited state government, supporting law enforcement, limiting taxes, preserving natural resources, and defending the Second Amendment. He also supports tougher sentences for violent criminals and people who commit handgun violations.

In March 2023, Valentine was one of two members of the House of Delegates to vote against the Maryland Child Victims Act, which abolished the statute of limitations for child sexual abuse lawsuits and create a "look back window" to allow survivors to file lawsuits alleging past sexual abuse.

During the 2026 legislative session, Valentine voted against a bill that would prohibit counties from entering into 287(g) program agreements with U.S. Immigration and Customs Enforcement, saying that he wants counties that choose to participate in the program to be able to transfer custody of individuals with detainers in secure facilities like detention centers.

== Personal life ==
Valentine is married. He attends religious services at the Mt. Tabor Lutheran Church in Rocky Ridge, Maryland.

== Electoral history ==
Frederick County Council District 5 Republican primary election, 2018
Party	Candidate	Votes	%
Republican	Michael J. Blue	2,025	55.3
Republican	William M. Valentine	1,640	44.7

Maryland House of Delegates District 2A Republican primary election, 2022
Party	Candidate	Votes	%
Republican	William J. Wivell	5,751	42.9
Republican	William Valentine	3,069	22.9
Republican	Seth Edward Wilson	2,340	17.5
Republican	Bradley Belmont	2,235	16.7

Maryland House of Delegates District 2A election, 2022
Party	Candidate	Votes	%
Republican	William Valentine	19,839	49.59
Republican	William J. Wivell	19,458	48.64
Write-in		711	1.78
