= Robert A. McKee =

American politician and sex offender (born 1949)

Member of the Maryland House of Delegates from the 2A district
- In office January 11, 1995 – February 18, 2008
- Preceded by: Casper R. Taylor Jr.
- Succeeded by: Andrew A. Serafini

Personal details
- Born: May 7, 1949 (age 77) Hagerstown, Maryland, U.S.
- Party: Republican

Robert McKee (born May 7, 1949) is an American former politician and sex offender. He was a member of the Maryland House of Delegates, having represented District 2A, which covers part of Washington County. McKee was first elected into office in 1994 when he defeated Democrat Richard E. Roulette. In 1998 he ran unopposed. In 2002, he defeated Peter E. Perini Sr. with 75% of the vote and in 2006, he again ran unopposed, out-matching the write-ins with 99.2% of the vote. He resigned from the Maryland House of Delegates in 2008 after authorities discovered child sexual abuse material on his computer. Later that year, he pled guilty to charges related to that investigation.

== Education ==
Delegate Robert McKee graduated from South Hagerstown High School. After finishing high school he attended Hagerstown Junior College, where he received his Associates of Arts Degree in 1969. He then transferred to Lynchburg College where he earned his Bachelor of Arts Degree in political science in 1971. Later, he attended Frostburg State University where graduated with his Master of Business Administration (M.B.A.) in 1991.

== Career ==
McKee has been active in his community since graduating from college. He served as a Hospital Corpsman in the U.S. Naval Reserve from 1971 to 1977. He served as the executive director of the Big Brothers/Big Sisters of Washington County, Maryland. He was selected to be a delegate to the Republican Party National Convention in 1972. As a member of the Hagerstown Jaycees, he was the Chaplain from 1978 to 1984.

McKee was the Chair of the Citizens Advisory Committee for the Lincolnshire School from 1980 to 1984. He was the President of the Little League of Halfway from 1980 to 1985, and again from 1992 to 1994. Simultaneously, he was the Treasurer of the Washington County Mental Health Association from 1980 to 1987 and Secretary of the Antietam Exchange Club since 1984. Finally, he was Secretary of Parent and Child Center Advisory Committee from 1985 to 1988.

He has received several awards including the Carey Brewer Alumni Award from Lynchburg College, in 1986.

=== Controversy ===
McKee resigned from the House of Delegates on February 15, 2008, after members of the cyber crime unit searched McKee's home, removing a personal computer and other undisclosed items, during a child pornography investigation. McKee's replacement was Republican Andrew A. Serafini.

McKee pleaded guilty to possession of child pornography on September 5, 2008, and was sentenced to a 37-month term, which will be followed by lifetime supervised probation. U.S. District Judge William D. Quarles Jr. also ordered McKee to register as a sex offender.

=== Legislative notes ===
- voted against the Clean Indoor Air Act of 2007 (HB359)
- voted against in-state tuition for illegal immigrants in 2007 (HB6)
- voted against the Healthy Air Act in 2006 (SB154)
- voted for slots in 2005 (HB1361)
- voted for electric deregulation in 1999 (HB870)

== Election results ==
- 2006 Race for Maryland State Senate – District 2A

Voters to choose one:

| Name | Votes | Percent | Outcome |
|---|---|---|---|
| Robert A. McKee, Rep. | 11,676 | 99.2% | Won |
| Other write-ins | 94 | 0.8% | Lost |

- 2002 Race for Maryland State Senate – District 2A

Voters to choose one:

| Name | Votes | Percent | Outcome |
|---|---|---|---|
| Robert A. McKee, Rep. | 10,223 | 74.67% | Won |
| Peter E. Perini Sr. | 3,447 | 25.18% | Lost |

- 1998 Race for Maryland State Senate – District 2A

Voters to choose one:

| Name | Votes | Percent | Outcome |
|---|---|---|---|
| Robert A. McKee, Rep. | 8,198 | 100% | Won |

- 1994 Race for Maryland State Senate – District 2A

Voters to choose one:

| Name | Votes | Percent | Outcome |
|---|---|---|---|
| Robert A. McKee, Rep. | 6,085 | 64% | Won |
| Richard E. Roulette | 3,358 | 36% | Lost |
