= Suited for Change =

U.S. nonprofit organization

Suited for Change is a Washington, DC–based non-profit organization founded in 1992 that provides professional clothing and ongoing career education to low-income women who have completed job training or job readiness programs and are seeking employment. Services are available by referral only through job training programs and social service agencies with which the organization partners in Washington, DC, Maryland and northern Virginia.

Suited for Change was a founding member of The Women's Alliance, a national organization of independent community-based “sister organizations” who provide professional attire, career skills training and related services to low-income women seeking employment.
