= Paul Corderman =

American politician (born 1977)

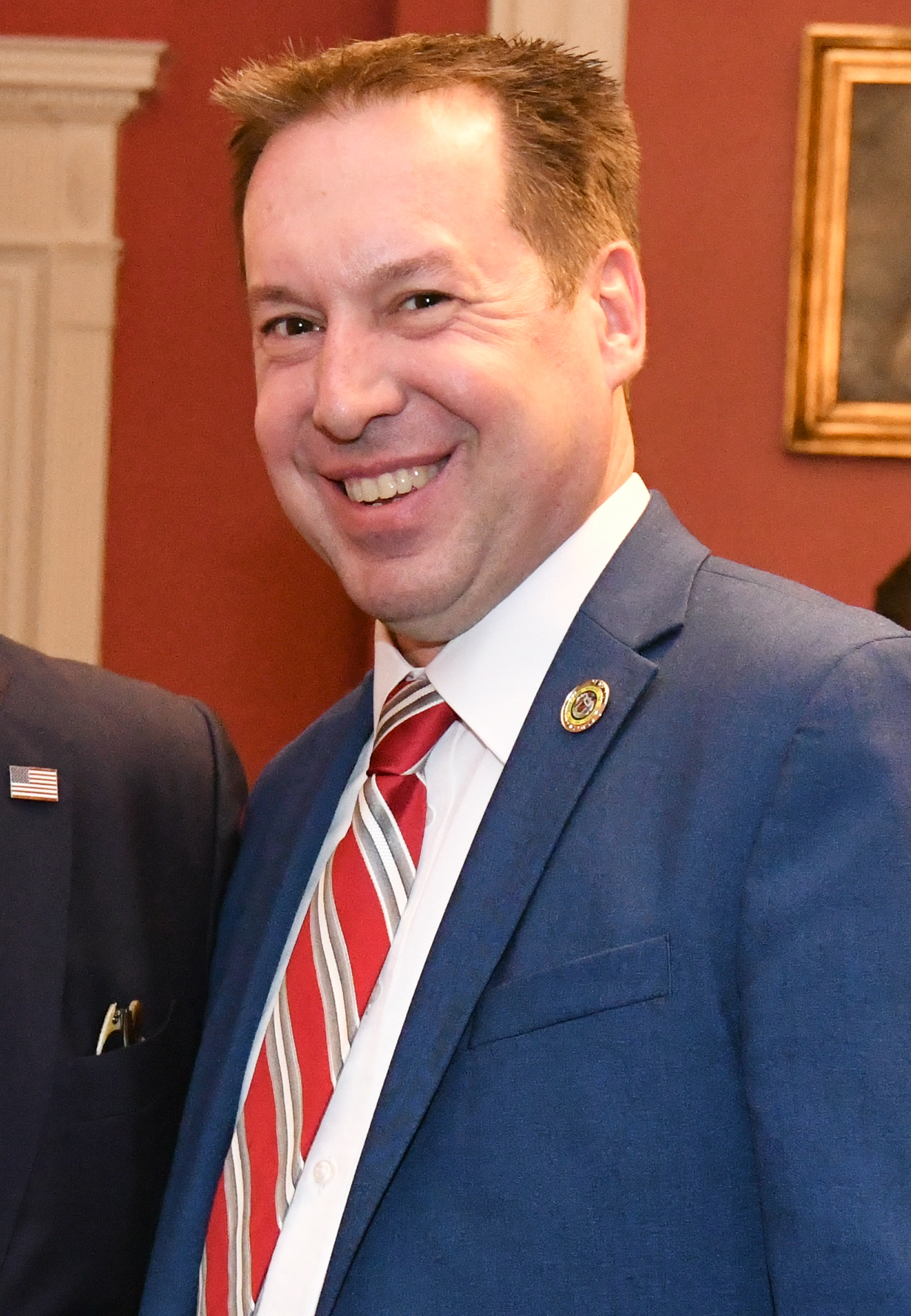
- Corderman in 2020

Member of the Maryland Senate from the 2nd district
- Incumbent
- Assumed office September 1, 2020
- Appointed by: Larry Hogan
- Preceded by: Andrew A. Serafini

Member of the Maryland House of Delegates from the 2B district
- In office December 20, 2017 – August 31, 2020
- Appointed by: Larry Hogan
- Preceded by: Brett Wilson
- Succeeded by: Brenda J. Thiam

Member of the Hagerstown City Council
- In office November 29, 2016 – December 19, 2017
- Preceded by: Penny May Nigh; Martin Brubaker
- Succeeded by: Charles Austin Heffernan Jr.

Personal details
- Born: September 1, 1977 (age 49) Hagerstown, Maryland, U.S.
- Party: Republican
- Spouse: Kerri
- Children: 1
- Parent: John P. Corderman (father)
- Education: University of Maryland, College Park (BA)

Paul D. Corderman (born September 1, 1977) is an American politician from Maryland and a member of the Republican Party. He is a member of the Maryland Senate from District 2, which covers parts of Washington County, assuming office on September 1, 2020. He was a member of the Maryland House of Delegates from District 2B from December 2017 to August 2020.

== Early life ==
Corderman was born on September 1, 1977, in Hagerstown, Maryland to John P. Corderman, a member of the Maryland Senate and circuit court judge. He graduated from North Hagerstown High School in 1995, and later attended the University of Maryland, College Park, where he earned a Bachelor of Arts degree in criminal justice in 2000.

== Political career ==
Corderman first got involved in politics following the death of his father in July 2012.

In 2016, Corderman ran for the Hagerstown City Council on a platform of increasing grants and tax incentives and cutting regulations. He was sworn in on November 29, 2016. Corderman resigned from the city council to serve in the Maryland House of Delegates on December 19, 2017. He was succeeded by Charles Austin Heffernan Jr.

=== Maryland General Assembly ===
In November 2017, following Governor Larry Hogan's appointment of state delegate Brett Wilson to the Washington County Circuit Court, Corderman applied to serve the remainder of Wilson's term in the Maryland House of Delegates. In December 2017, the Washington County Republican Central Committee voted to nominate Corderman to fill the seat, and Hogan appointed Corderman to the Maryland House of Delegates later that month. He was sworn in on December 20, 2017. Corderman was elected to a full four-year term in 2018.

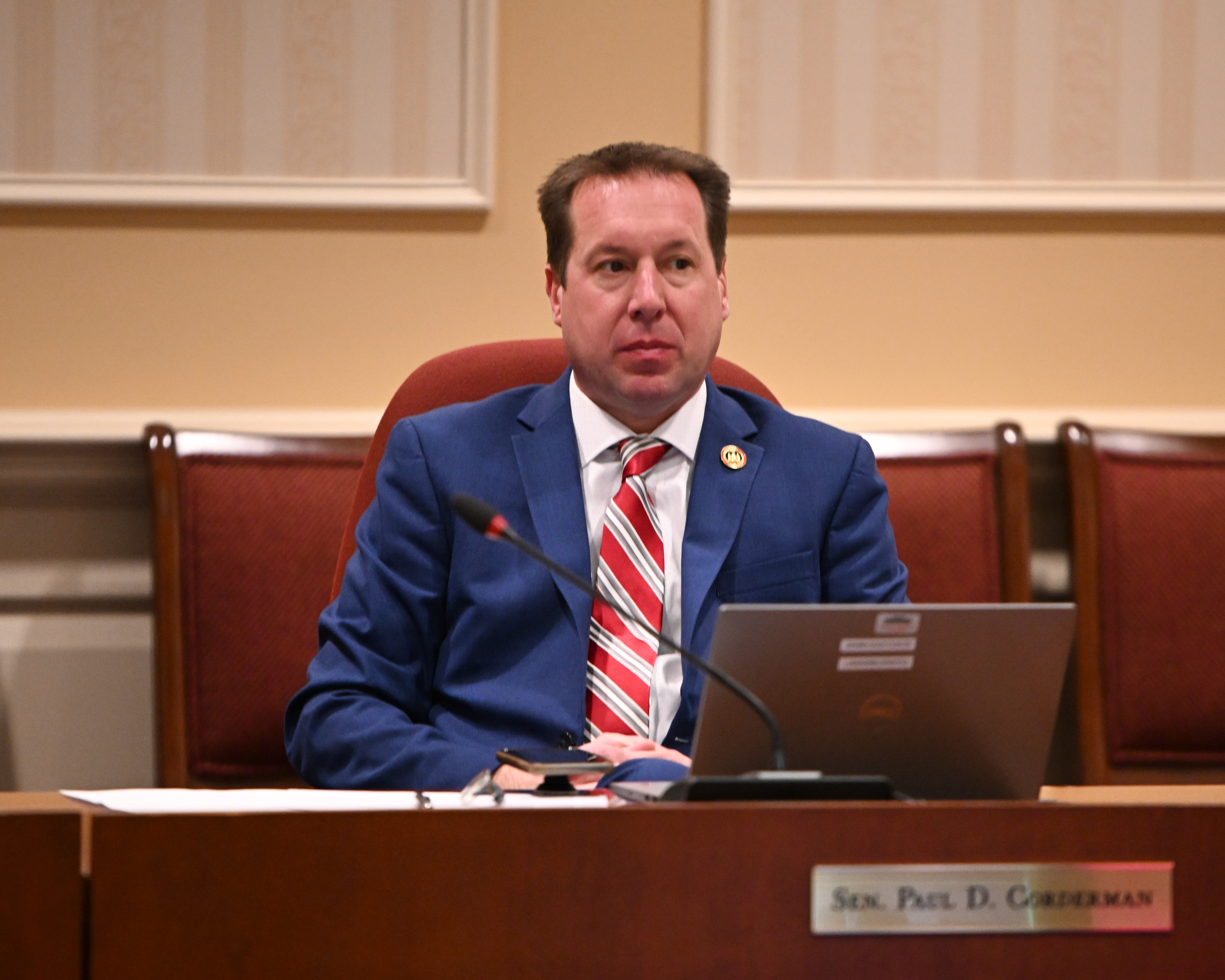
Corderman in the Senate Budget and Taxation Committee, 2023

In August 2020, following the resignation of state senator Andrew A. Serafini, Corderman said he would apply to serve the remainder of Serafini's term in the Maryland Senate. The Washington County Republican Central Committee nominated Corderman to fill the vacancy on August 26, and Hogan appointed him to the Maryland Senate the following day. He was sworn in on September 1, 2020. Since 2023, Corderman has served as the ranking chair of the Senate Budget and Taxation Committee.

Corderman ran for a full full-year term in the Maryland Senate in 2022. During the primaries, he filed a lawsuit against Democratic challenger Shawn Demetrious Perry, alleging that Perry was ineligible to run because he did not live within the district. In June 2022, Circuit Court Judge Dana Moylan Wright denied Corderman's challenge to Perry's candidacy. Corderman defeated Perry in the general election on November 8, 2022, receiving 63.8 percent of the vote to Perry's 36.1 percent.

== Political positions ==
=== Crime and policing ===
During the 2020 legislative session, Corderman introduced the "Suzanne Jones Act", named for a woman stabbed to death in Hagerstown in October 2017, that would require state correctional facilities to release prisoners back into the communities where they lived before incarceration. The bill failed to pass out of committee. In April 2020, he signed onto a letter questioning the early release of prisoners amid the COVID-19 pandemic.

In September 2020, Corderman signed onto a letter calling for the cancellation of hearings on police reform, expressing concerns that the hearings would demoralize police officers.

In July 2024, after a fatal shooting in downtown Hagerstown, Corderman released a statement describing the city as "in crisis and under siege" and accusing Hagerstown mayor Tekesha Martinez and the city council of "remaining silent" on public safety issues.

=== Education ===
Corderman supports the Broadening Options and Opportunities for Students Today (BOOST) program, which provides scholarships to students attending private schools, and criticized funding cuts to the program in the state's 2019 budget. In November 2026, he called for a review of the Blueprint for Maryland's Future, questioning whether the state could sustain the financial commitments associated with the education reform plan under current economic conditions, but did not call for cuts to education funding.

=== Energy ===
In April 2026, during debate on the Utility RELIEF Act, Corderman introduced an amendment that would allow gas companies to spread the cost of new lines among all customers instead of only the customers requesting new natural gas service. The amendment was adopted.

=== Health care ===
During the 2020 legislative session, Corderman introduced legislation to increase Medicaid reimbursements for emergency medical services.

In August 2022, Corderman criticized a proposal by Mayor Emily Keller to locate a 24-hour crisis center in downtown Hagerstown, saying that it was contributing to the "disintegration and degradation of our downtown community". He also said he opposed bills decriminalizing certain drug-related violations in Maryland.

In November 2026, amid a $3 billion budget deficit, Corderman suggested strengthening the state's Medicaid eligibility reviews to ensure benefits are only going to individuals who qualify.

=== Housing ===
In January 2017, Corderman said he opposed plans to redevelop Noland Village in Hagerstown, saying it would worsen the city's various socioeconomic issues, including the opioid epidemic. He later voted against a PILOT agreement with Bethel Gardens, a low-income housing complex in downtown Hagerstown.

=== Taxes ===
During the 2022 legislative session, Corderman introduced legislation that would provide income tax breaks to health care workers following the COVID-19 pandemic.

In 2023, Corderman introduced a bill that would prohibit Washington County from charging an entertainment tax.

=== Transportation ===
Corderman supports the expansion of Interstate 81 and has called for increased state funding toward the project.

During the 2020 legislative session, Corderman introduced a bill requiring a study on expanding MARC Train commuter rail lines to Hancock and Cumberland, which passed and became law. He was also the only Republican state delegate to vote in favor of a bill increasing state transit maintenance spending by $500 million.

== Personal life ==
Corderman is married to his wife, Kerri. Together, they have a daughter.

== Electoral history ==
Hagerstown City Council primary election, 2016
Candidate	Votes	%
Kristin B. Aleshire (incumbent)	4,138	16.2
Don Munson (incumbent)	3,348	13.1
Emily Keller	3,024	11.9
Penny May Nigh (incumbent)	2,960	11.6
Lewis C. Metzner (incumbent)	2,892	11.3
Paul D. Corderman	2,868	11.2
Carlos Reyes	1,567	6.1
Aaron C. Smith	1,525	6.0
Dot McDonald-Kline	1,323	5.2
Brandon Scott Boldyga	1,082	4.2
Colin Ploscaru	787	3.1

Hagerstown city council election, 2016
Candidate	Votes	%
Emily Keller	7,634	15.7
Kristin B. Aleshire (incumbent)	6,927	14.3
Paul D. Corderman	6,825	14.1
Don Munson (incumbent)	6,533	13.5
Lewis C. Metzner (incumbent)	6,078	12.5
Penny May Nigh (incumbent)	6,071	12.5
Carlos Reyes	3,356	6.9
Aaron C. Smith	2,581	5.3
Dot McDonald-Kline	2,319	4.8
Write-in	162	0.3

Maryland House of Delegates District 2B Republican primary election, 2018
Party	Candidate	Votes	%
Republican	Paul D. Corderman (incumbent)	1,144	100.0

Maryland House of Delegates District 2B election, 2018
Party	Candidate	Votes	%
Republican	Paul D. Corderman (incumbent)	5,457	51.9
Democratic	Peter E. Perini Sr.	5,028	47.8
Write-in		25	0.2

Maryland Senate District 2 Republican primary election, 2022
Party	Candidate	Votes	%
Republican	Paul D. Corderman (incumbent)	8,467	100.0

Maryland Senate District 2 election, 2022
Party	Candidate	Votes	%
Republican	Paul D. Corderman (incumbent)	25,881	63.8
Democratic	Shawn Demetrious Perry	14,629	36.1
Write-in		32	0.1
