= John P. Corderman =

American politician (1942-2012)

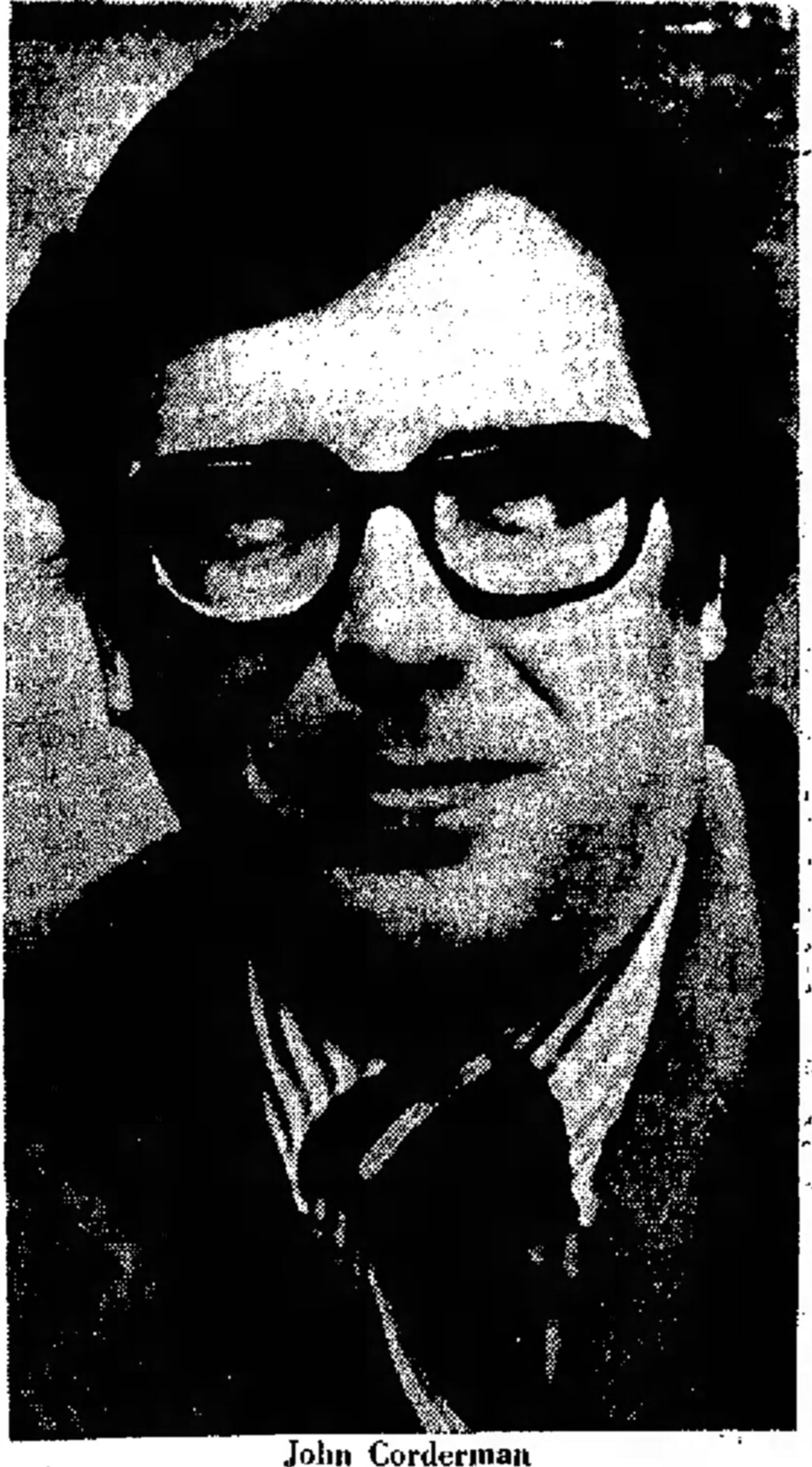
- Corderman, c. 1974

Member of the Maryland Senate from the 2nd district
- In office 1975–1978
- Preceded by: district restructured
- Succeeded by: Victor Cushwa

Personal details
- Born: John Printz Corderman; May 14, 1942 Hagerstown, Maryland, U.S.
- Died: July 31, 2012 (aged 70) Baltimore, Maryland, U.S.
- Party: Democratic
- Children: Paul D. Corderman
- Education: University of Maryland (BA); University of Maryland School of Law (JD)
- Occupation: Politician; judge

John Printz Corderman (May 14, 1942 – July 31, 2012) was an American politician and judge. He served in the Maryland Senate from 1975 to 1978.

== Early life ==
John Printz Corderman was born in Hagerstown, Maryland, on May 14, 1942. He attended Hagerstown public schools and Hagerstown Junior College. He graduated from the University of Maryland in 1965 with a Bachelor of Arts. He graduated from the University of Maryland School of Law with a J.D. and was admitted to the bar in Maryland in 1968.

== Career ==
Corderman was a Democrat for most of his political and judicial career. Corderman was the deputy state's attorney for Washington County from 1971 to 1974. He served as a member of the Maryland Senate, representing District 2, from 1975 to 1978. He resigned in 1978 and was succeeded by Victor Cushwa.

Corderman was an associate judge of the Circuit Court in Washington County (4th judicial circuit) starting in 1977. In December 1989, a mail bomb disguised as a Christmas gift blew up in Corderman's hand. He was injured in the groin and right hand. He also had hearing loss. He retired in March 1993, citing hearing problems. In 2008, Corderman, then retired, received a letter with suspicious powder, and the culprit was convicted for five years.

Corderman served on the board of directors of YMCA from 1983 to 1989. He served on the board of directors of the Rotary Club from 1986 to 1991 and as president from 1989 to 1990. In 1996, he answered an ad, becoming attorney general of Palau for a year. In 1997, he registered as a Republican, and ran for Washington County commissioner in 1998.

== Personal life ==
Corderman's son, Paul D. Corderman, became a Republican state politician.

Corderman died at the Johns Hopkins Bayview Medical Center on July 31, 2012.
