= 2024 United States Senate election in Maryland =

- November 5, 2024
- Turnout: 72.84% ▲14.67 pp
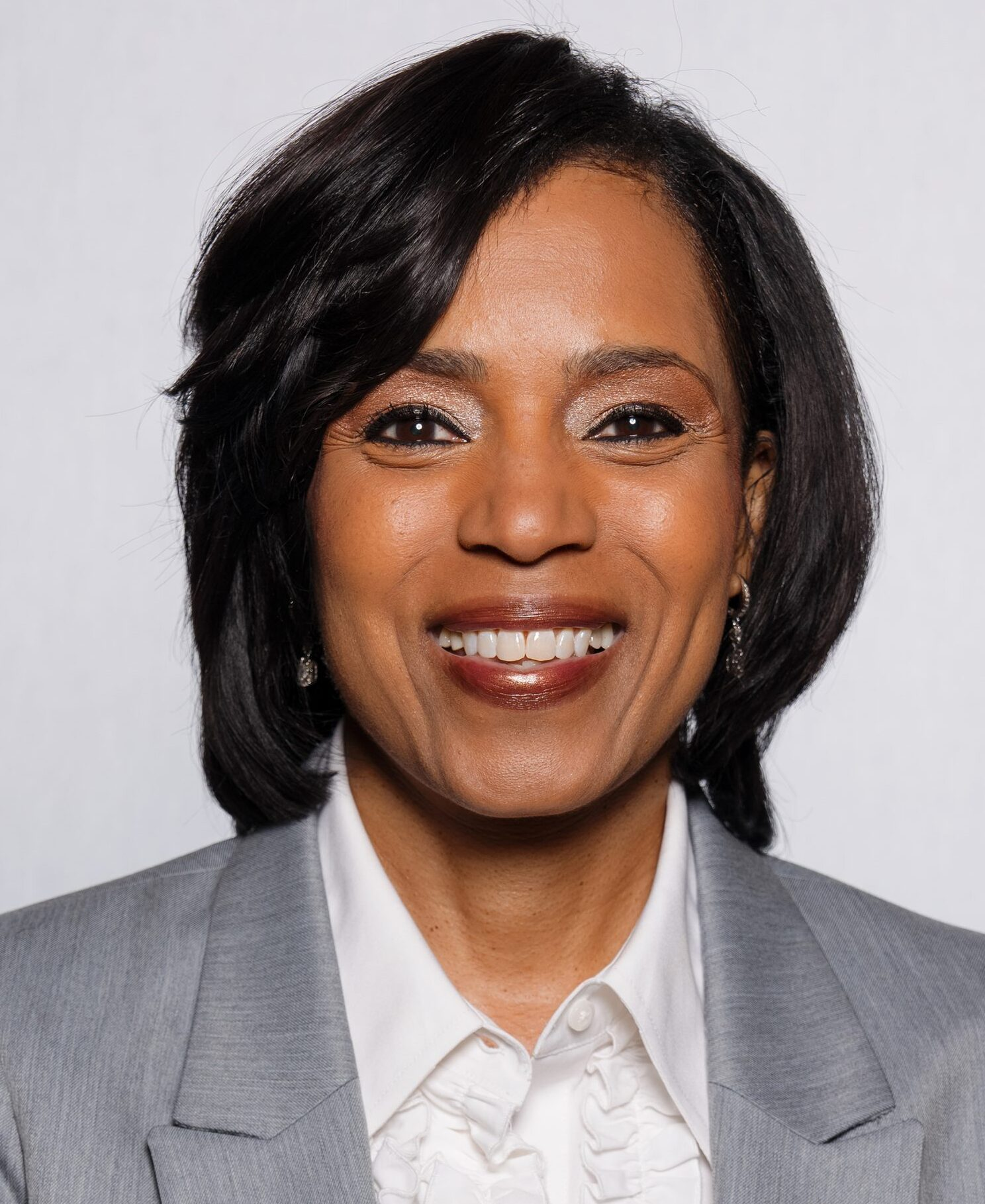

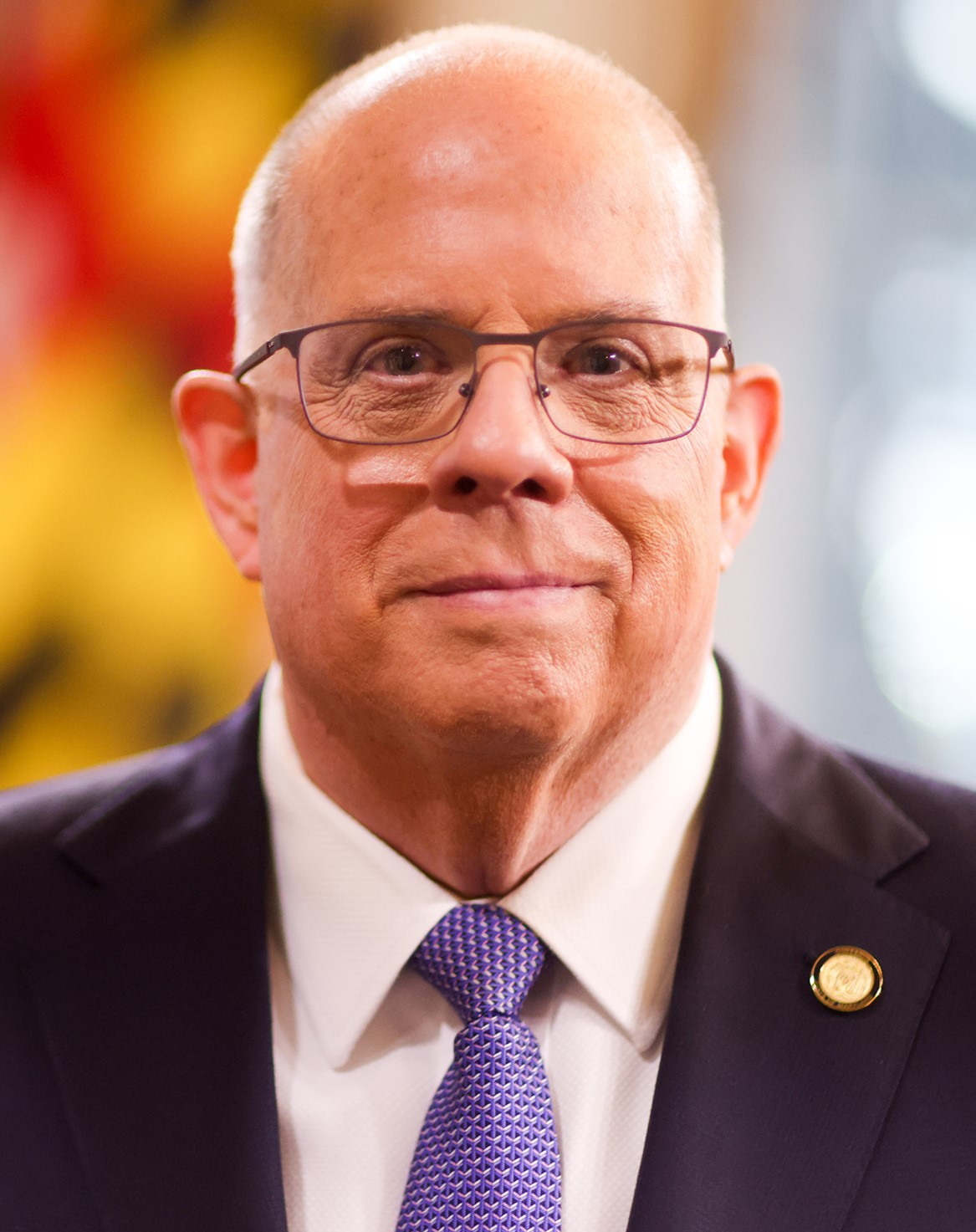
Nominee	Angela Alsobrooks	Larry Hogan
Party	Democratic	Republican
Popular vote	1,650,912	1,294,344
Percentage	54.64%	42.84%
- Alsobrooks: 40–50% 50–60% 60–70% 70–80% 80–90% >90% Hogan: 40–50% 50–60% 60–70% 70–80% 80–90% >90%
U.S. senator before election
Ben Cardin
Democratic
Elected U.S. senator
Angela Alsobrooks
Democratic

The 2024 United States Senate election in Maryland was held on November 5, 2024, to elect a member of the United States Senate to represent the state of Maryland. Democratic Prince George's County executive Angela Alsobrooks won her first term in office, defeating Republican former governor Larry Hogan. She succeeded Democratic incumbent Ben Cardin, who did not seek a fourth term.

After Cardin announced his retirement, Alsobrooks and Congressman David Trone emerged as the frontrunners in the Democratic primary. Although Trone heavily outspent Alsobrooks and led most public opinion polls, Alsobrooks won her party's nomination with 53% of the vote after taking a polling lead during the primary's final weeks. Hogan, who entered the race hours before the filing deadline, quickly emerged as the Republican frontrunner and won his party's nomination with 64% of the vote against former state delegate Robin Ficker.

Despite Maryland's status as a reliably Democratic state, the election was considered more competitive than usual due to Hogan's popularity, reputation as a moderate Republican, and opposition to Donald Trump. Alsobrooks was still considered the favorite to win, due to Maryland's heavy Democratic lean and the concurrent presidential election.

Republicans have not won a Senate race in Maryland since 1980.

Hogan's margin was 17 points better than Trump's margin in Maryland, the largest gap between senatorial and presidential margins in the 2024 cycle, and this election was the closest Senate race in Maryland since 2006. Hogan carried Anne Arundel and Frederick counties—both won by Kamala Harris in the presidential race—and became the first Republican to exceed one million votes in a Maryland U.S. Senate election, the highest total for a Republican in the state's history. Despite this, Hogan could not overcome Alsobrooks's margins in the Washington–Baltimore metropolitan area, and lost the election by nearly 12 points.

Alsobrooks's election, alongside Lisa Blunt Rochester's victory in neighboring Delaware, marks the first time that two African American women have served concurrently in the United States Senate.

== Background ==
At the federal and state level, Maryland is a deeply blue state and one of the most reliably Democratic states in the nation, with Joe Biden carrying it by 33 points in the 2020 presidential election. Elections in Maryland are dominated by the Baltimore metropolitan area and the D.C. suburbs. At the time of this election, Democrats occupied both Senate seats, seven out of eight House seats, supermajorities in both houses of the state legislature, and all statewide offices.

Republicans had not won Maryland's Class 1 seat since 1970. Although the entry of former Maryland governor Larry Hogan was expected to make the race more competitive, the winner of the Democratic primary was favored to win in the general election, given that Republicans had not won a Senate seat in the state of Maryland since 1980. The decline of split-ticket voting in U.S. Senate races was expected to favor the Democrats for this race.

Hogan led in most polls through April 2024, but polls in May showed both Trone and Alsobrooks leading against Hogan, and a higher number of undecided voters.

Alsobrooks continued to lead Hogan in general election polling, but with a smaller lead than Democrats usually enjoy in Maryland.

== Democratic primary ==
=== Campaign ===
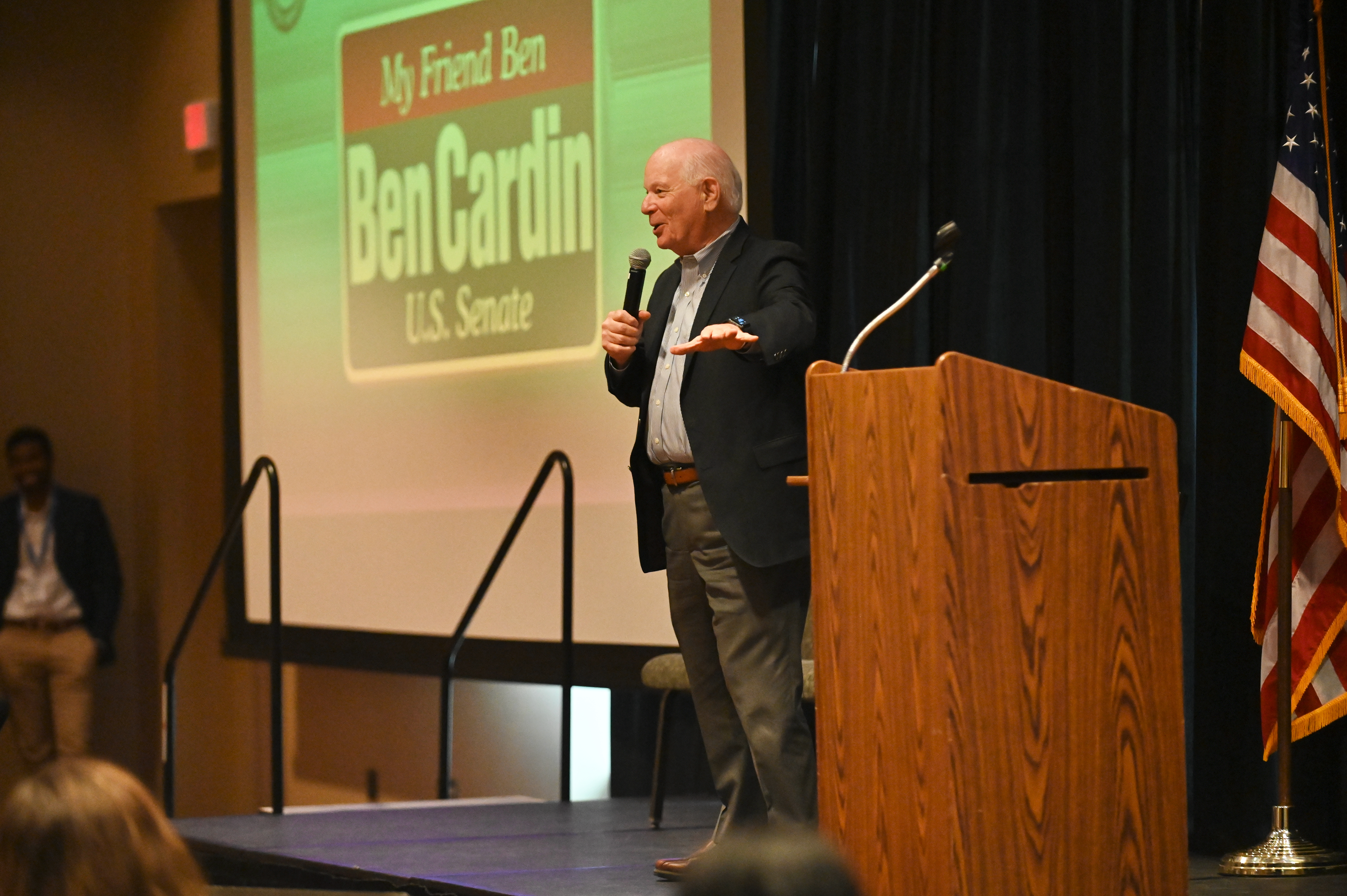
Ben Cardin in 2023

In the early months of 2023, Cardin's low fundraising and cash-on-hand numbers led to speculation that he would retire. Several potential candidates, including Angela Alsobrooks and David Trone, began hiring campaign advisers in anticipation of Cardin's possible retirement, which he announced on May 1, 2023, ending a political career that spanned over 50 years.

The following day, at-large Montgomery County Councilmember Will Jawando announced that he would run for Senate. He was joined by Trone and Alsobrooks later in the week. Upon Trone's entry into the race, the Democratic primary quickly developed into a contest between money and endorsements, with Alsobrooks receiving major endorsements from the Maryland Democratic establishment and Trone self-financing his campaign with $61 million in personal loans, which he said protects him from political influence and would allow the Democratic Senatorial Campaign Committee to focus its resources on more competitive races. Trone suggested that he could spend as much as $50 million on the race. Despite Trone's ad blitz, independent polling portrayed him as only the slight favorite in the Democratic primary.

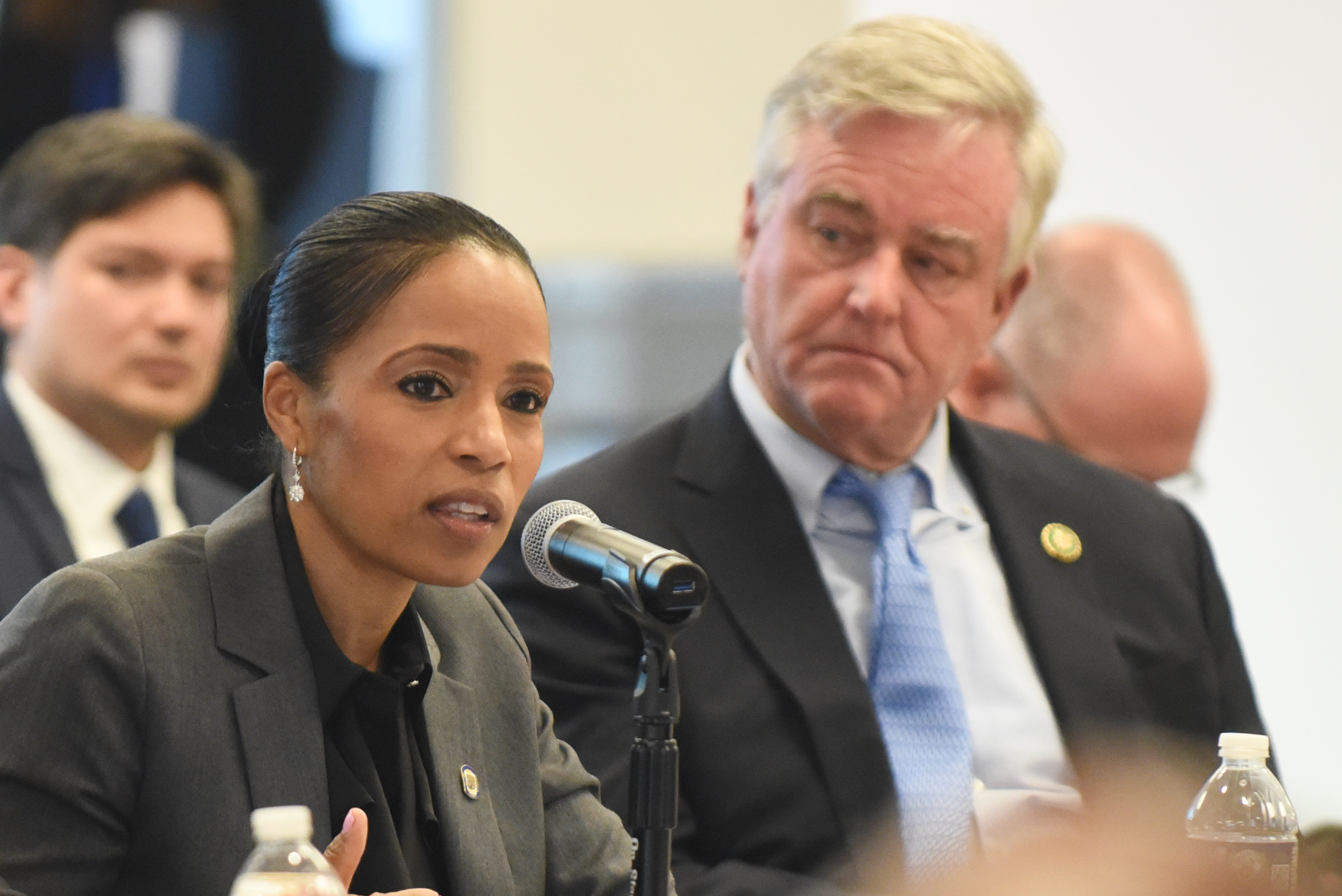
Angela Alsobrooks (left) and David Trone (right) in 2023

During the Democratic primary, Jawando and Trone sought to present themselves as progressives and political outsiders, pointing to their careers and political records, despite Trone's record in Congress being more aligned with its moderate members. Alsobrooks, meanwhile, emphasized "kitchen-table" issues such as community safety and health care in her campaign while also focusing on her political career. Candidates campaigned heavily in the Baltimore metropolitan area, which was seen as a key battleground in the Democratic primary as Trone and Alsobrooks were expected to dominate in their respective home counties of Montgomery and Prince George's County, which are of similar sizes and were considered likely to cancel each other out in the primary results. This was not the case, as Alsobrooks not only bested Trone in Montgomery County, but also in most of Maryland's other urban counties.

Alsobrooks and Trone, who were viewed by media outlets as the frontrunners, faced controversies that had the potential to damage their campaigns: Alsobrooks' record as a prosecutor was scrutinized by progressive-media outlet The Intercept, while Trone faced criticism for his campaign contributions toward Republican politicians through Total Wine & More and for political gaffes made during the campaign, including his accidental use of a racial slur during a congressional hearing. On the campaign trail, Alsobrooks criticized Trone for these contributions and for spending heavily in the race, while Trone characterized Alsobrooks as a "career politician" with an insufficient record on reproductive rights, criticized her for not including any Latinos in her cabinet, and suggested she would be influenced by the corporations that had donated to her campaign. Alsobrooks and some of her supporters, including Maryland treasurer Dereck E. Davis and Prince George's County councilmember Jolene Ivey, expressed concerns that Trone's comments toward Alsobrooks and her supporters could make coalescing around Trone difficult if he becomes the Democratic nominee; Trone supporters, including state delegate Joseline Peña-Melnyk, dismissed these concerns. Peña-Melnyk said that Democrats should "focus on the issues" going into the election and not "make that mistake again" as happened with Larry Hogan's victory in 2014. In interviews with WTOP-FM before the primary election, both candidates said that they will support the Democratic nominee in the general election.

Jawando dropped out of the race on October 20, 2023, and later endorsed Alsobrooks, leaving a contest between Alsobrooks and Trone in the Democratic primary. Alsobrooks was seen as the early frontrunner of the Democratic primary, but momentum quickly built up behind Trone's campaign as he self-funded his campaign and its nonstop media blitz, which increased his name recognition and approval ratings in polling and overwhelmed the Alsobrooks campaign's resources. The Democratic primary has been compared to the primary in Maryland's 2016 U.S. Senate election, in which Chris Van Hollen defeated Donna Edwards. Upon former governor Larry Hogan's entry into the race, the Democratic primary largely transformed into a contest to determine which candidate had the best chance of defeating him, with candidates shifting from talking about their experience and leadership styles to talking about national issues—such as abortion, the U.S. Supreme Court, and Donald Trump—and criticizing Hogan's legislative record as governor.

Alsobrooks trailed Trone in public opinion polls for most of the Democratic primary, but enjoyed a surge of support in the final weeks of the election as voters tuned in, more senior Democratic figures voiced their support for her and while Trone's campaign suffered from various gaffes he had made on the campaign trail. She defeated Trone in the Democratic primary election on May 14, 2024, with her support largely coming from the state's highly-populated and urban counties, especially in her home base of Prince George's County, while majority votes for Trone came from Maryland's rural areas and Frederick County.

=== Candidates ===
==== Nominee ====
- Angela Alsobrooks, Prince George's County Executive (2018–2024)

==== Eliminated in primary ====
- Michael Cobb, congressional aide
- Marcellus Crews, tech executive
- Brian Frydenborg, freelance journalist and research consultant
- Scottie Griffin, former Charlottesville City Public Schools Superintendent and write-in candidate for U.S. Senate in 2022
- Robert K. Houton, nonprofit executive
- Joseph Perez, IT project manager and Republican candidate for U.S. Senate in 2022
- Steve Seuferer, IT professional
- David Trone, U.S. representative for Maryland's 6th congressional district (2019–2025)
- Andrew Jaye Wildman, writer and perennial candidate

==== Withdrawn ====
- Juan Dominguez, former vice president of Breezeline and former Republican Bogota, New Jersey borough councilor (1995–1998) (ran for U.S. House)
- Will Jawando, at-large Montgomery County councilor (2018–present) and candidate for Maryland's 8th congressional district in 2016 (endorsed Alsobrooks)

==== Declined ====
- Ben Cardin, incumbent U.S. senator (2007–2025)
- Kweisi Mfume, U.S. representative for Maryland's 7th congressional district (1987–1996; 2020–present), candidate for U.S. Senate in 2006, and former president of the NAACP (1996–2004) (endorsed Alsobrooks, ran for re-election)
- Wes Moore, governor of Maryland (2023–present) (endorsed Alsobrooks)
- Johnny Olszewski, Baltimore County Executive (2018–2025) and former state delegate from the 6th district (2006–2015) (endorsed Alsobrooks, ran for U.S. House)
- Tom Perez, former chair of the Democratic National Committee (2017–2021), former U.S. Secretary of Labor (2013–2017), former Maryland Secretary of Labor (2007–2009), and candidate for governor of Maryland in 2022
- Jamie Raskin, U.S. representative for Maryland's 8th congressional district (2017–present) (ran for re-election, endorsed Alsobrooks)
- John Sarbanes, U.S. representative for Maryland's 3rd congressional district (2007–2025) and son of former U.S. Senator Paul Sarbanes (endorsed Alsobrooks)

=== Endorsements ===
Angela Alsobrooks

U.S. ambassadors

- Kirk Wagar, U.S. Ambassador to Singapore (2013–2017)

U.S. senators

- Cory Booker, New Jersey (2013–present)
- Laphonza Butler, California (2023–2024)
- Mo Cowan, Massachusetts (2013)
- Kirsten Gillibrand, New York (2009–present)
- Barbara Mikulski, Maryland (1987–2017)
- Chris Murphy, Connecticut (2013–present)
- Patty Murray, Washington (1993–present)
- Chris Van Hollen, Maryland (2017–present)
- Raphael Warnock, Georgia (2021–present)

U.S. representatives

- Beverly Byron, MD-06 (1979–1993)
- Steny Hoyer, MD-05 (1981–present)
- Glenn Ivey, MD-04 (2023–present)
- Kweisi Mfume, MD-07 (1987–1996, 2020–present)
- Jamie Raskin, MD-08 (2017–present)
- John Sarbanes, MD-03 (2007–2025)
- Albert Wynn, MD-04 (1993–2008)
- 10 other representatives

Statewide elected officials

- J. Joseph Curran Jr., Attorney General (1987–2007)
- Brian Frosh, Attorney General (2015–2023)
- Brooke Lierman, Comptroller (2023–present)
- Aruna Miller, lieutenant governor (2023–present)
- Wes Moore, governor (2023–present)

State cabinet officials

- Dereck Davis, Treasurer (2021–present)
- Gloria Lawlah, former Secretary of Aging (2007–2015)

State legislators

- 20 state senators, including senate President Bill Ferguson
- 56 state delegates, including house Speaker Adrienne Jones

County officials

- Rushern Baker, former Prince George's County Executive (2010–2018)
- Calvin Ball III, Howard County Executive (2018–present)
- Marc Elrich, Montgomery County Executive (2018–present)
- Wanika B. Fisher, Prince George's County councilor (2022–present)
- Jolene Ivey, Prince George's County councilor (2018–present)
- Will Jawando, at-large Montgomery County councilor (2018–present) and candidate for this seat in 2024
- Ike Leggett, former Montgomery County Executive (2006–2018)
- Don Mohler, former Baltimore County Executive (2018)
- Johnny Olszewski, Baltimore County Executive (2018–2025)
- Steuart Pittman, Anne Arundel County Executive (2018–present)
- ~~Kenneth Ulman, former Howard County Executive (2006–2014)~~ (Note: Revoked endorsement following election as chair of the Maryland Democratic Party)

Mayors

- Muriel Bowser, D.C. (2015–present)
- Gavin Buckley, Annapolis (2017–present)
- Victoria Jackson-Stanley, Cambridge (2008–2021)
- Brandon Scott, Baltimore (2020–present)
- Jack Young, Baltimore (2019–2020)

Other local officials

- Ivan Bates, Baltimore State's Attorney (2023–present)
- Sharon Green Middleton, Baltimore city councilor (2007–present)

Party officials

- 6 former Maryland Democratic Party chairs

Individuals

- Common, rapper and activist
- Larry Gibson, law professor
- H. Patrick Swygert, former president of Howard University (1995–2008)
- Mini Timmaraju, lawyer
- Jason Wright, president of the Washington Commanders

Labor unions

- Amalgamated Transit Union (Note: National and Local 689)
- American Federation of Government Employees
- Communications Workers of America
- IBEW Locals 70 and 1900
- International Association of Machinists and Aerospace Workers (Note: National and Maryland chapters)
- National Association of Government Employees
- 3 SEIU locals (Note: Locals 400, 722, and 1199SEIU United Healthcare Workers East)
- Teamsters Local 639 and Joint Council 55

Organizations

- Chesapeake Climate Action Network Action Fund
- Congressional Black Caucus PAC
- Council on American–Islamic Relations of Maryland (Democratic primary only)
- EMILY's List
- End Citizens United
- J Street PAC
- National Organization for Women PAC
- National Women's Political Caucus
- Reproductive Freedom for All

Newspapers

- Baltimore Afro-American
- The Washington Post
David Trone

U.S. executive branch officials

- April McClain Delaney, former NTIA deputy administrator (2022–2023)

U.S. representatives

- John Delaney, MD-06 (2013–2019)
- Hakeem Jeffries, House Minority Leader (2023–present) from NY-08 (2013–present)
- Dutch Ruppersberger, MD-02 (2003–2025)
- 68 other representatives

Statewide elected officials

- Anthony Brown, Attorney General (2023–present)

State legislators

- 9 state senators
- 26 state delegates

County officials

- Aisha Braveboy, Prince George's County State's Attorney (2018–present)
- Jessica Fitzwater, Frederick County Executive (2022–present)
- Jan Gardner, former Frederick County Executive (2014–2022)

Local officials

- Zeke Cohen, Baltimore city councilor from the 1st district (2016–2024)
- Yusef Salaam, New York City councilor from the 9th district (2024–present)

Individuals

- Jason Palmer, venture capitalist

Labor unions

- International Association of Fire Fighters Local 964
- International Association of Heat and Frost Insulators and Allied Workers Local 24
- International Association of Ironworkers Locals 5 and 568
- 4 International Brotherhood of Electrical Workers locals (Note: Locals 24, 26, 307, and 1200)
- 3 International Longshoremen's Association locals (Note: Baltimore District Council, and Locals 333 and 953)
- 3 Laborers' Union district councils (Note: Mid-Atlantic, Philadelphia/Baltimore/Washington, and Appalachian district councils)
- Maryland Fraternal Order of Police
- Maryland State Education Association
- National Education Association
- Service Employees International Union Locals 32BJ and 500
- SMART Union (Note: National and Local 100)
- United Auto Workers
Will Jawando (withdrawn)

Executive branch officials

- Bill Burton, former White House Deputy Press Secretary (2009–2011)

U.S. representatives

- Lauren Underwood, IL-14 (2019–present)

State legislators

- ~~Julie Palakovich Carr, state delegate from the 17th district (2019–present)~~ (endorsed Trone after Jawando withdrew)

Local officials

- Hans Riemer, former at-large Montgomery County councilor (2010–2022)

Individuals

- Kerry Washington, actress
Declined to endorse

U.S. senators

- Ben Cardin, Maryland (2007–2025)

Party officials

- Kenneth Ulman, chair of the Maryland Democratic Party (2023–present) and former Howard County Executive (2006–2014) (previously endorsed Alsobrooks)

Organizations

- Democratic Senatorial Campaign Committee
- Maryland Democratic Party

=== Debates and forums ===
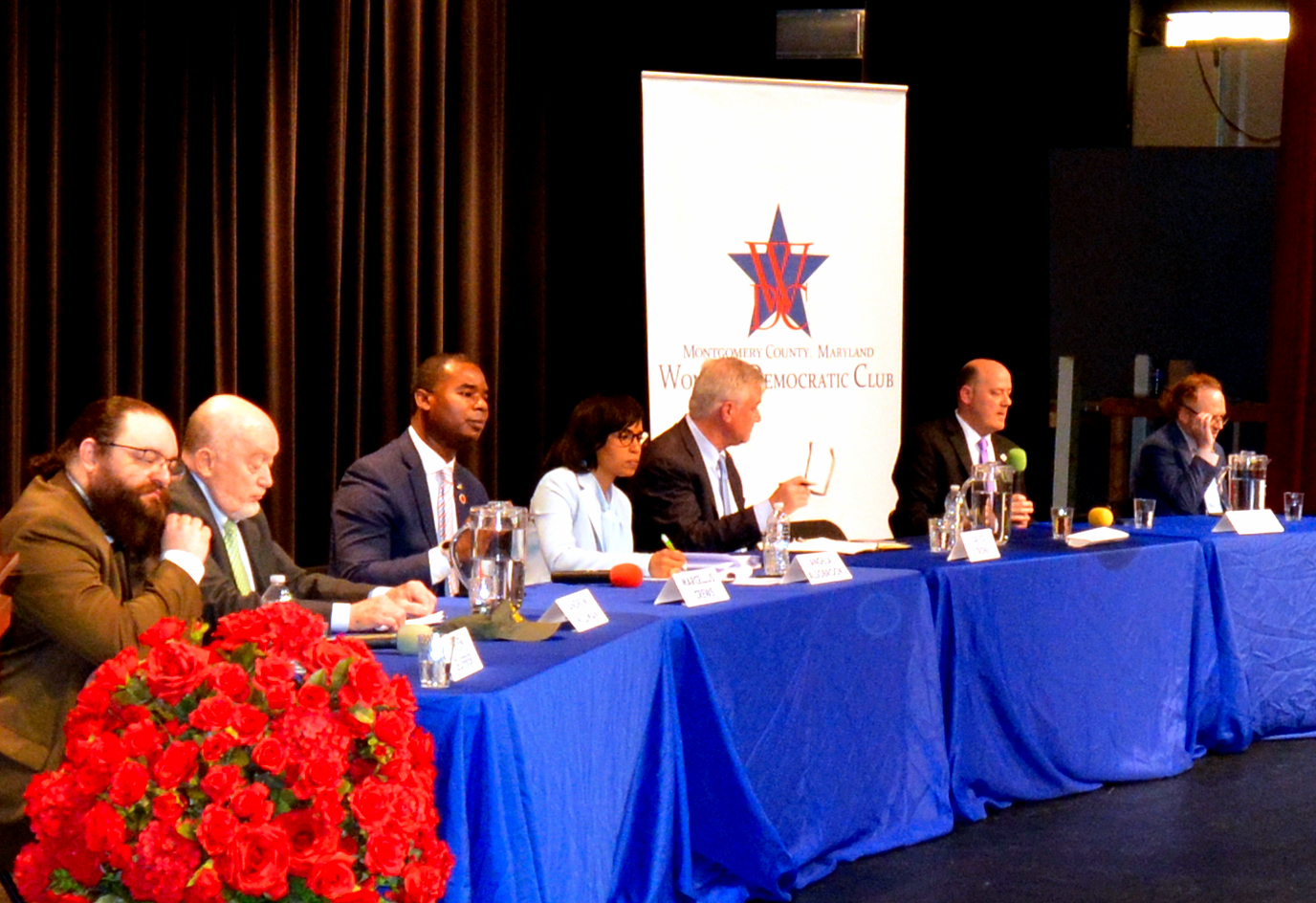
Democratic candidates debating at the Montgomery County Women's Democratic Club forum, 2024

A straw poll was held during the Maryland Democratic Party's forum on the Eastern Shore, which was won by Alsobrooks, who received 125 votes to Trone's 98 votes and Dominguez's 15 votes.

A televised debate between Alsobrooks and Trone hosted by WBAL-TV and WRC-TV was set to be held on April 23, 2024, but was cancelled after Trone refused to commit to the debate. Both campaigns agreed to attend a different televised debate hosted by WBFF and WJLA-TV a few days later, which was held on April 19. A second televised debate was held by WDCW on April 29, 2024, which was attended by Alsobrooks while Trone declined to attend.

2024 Maryland Democratic Senate primary debates
No.	Date	Host	Moderator	Link	Participants				
P Participant A Absent N Non-invitee I Invitee W Withdrawn									
P Participant A Absent N Non-invitee I Invitee W Withdrawn					Alsobrooks	Crews	Frydenborg	Trone	Others
1	Oct 24, 2023	Maryland Federation of NARFE	Barbara Cuffee	N/A	A	N	N	P	–
2	Nov 3, 2023	Maryland Democratic Party	Sam Shoge	N/A	P	N	N	P	P (Note: Juan Dominguez)
3	Dec 3, 2023	Latino Democrats of Prince George's County	Patricia Villone; William Ford	Website	P	N	N	P	P
4	Mar 2, 2024	Montgomery County; Women's Democratic Club	Jennifer Rubin	N/A	P	P	P	P	P (Note: Robert Houton, Steven Seuferer, Andrew Wildman)
5	Mar 8, 2024	Prince George's; County NAACP	Ebony McMorris; Jordan Howlette	YouTube	P	N	N	P	–
6	Mar 11, 2024	Frederick County; Conservative Club	Jonathan Jenkins; Matthew Foldi	Facebook	A	N	A	A	P (Note: Michael Cobb)
7	Mar 16, 2024	Baltimore City Democratic; State Central Committee	Karenthia Barber	Facebook I Facebook II	P	N	P	A	P (Note: Michael Cobb and Andrew Wildman)
8	Mar 21, 2024	League of Women Voters of Maryland	N/A	N/A	P	P	P	A	P (Note: Michael Cobb, Steven Seuferer, Andrew Wildman)
9	Mar 28, 2024	Democratic Club of Leisure World	Louis Peck; Erin Cox	N/A	P	N	N	P	–
10	Apr 2, 2024	Maryland Matters; Maryland League of Conservation Voters	Josh Kurtz; Staci Hartwell; Linda Kohn; Sydney Nwuli	YouTube	P	N	N	P	–
11	Apr 6, 2024	Frederick County; Democratic Party	N/A	Facebook	P	P	P	A	–
12	Apr 7, 2024	Baltimore County Democratic; State Central Committee	Jayne Miller	Facebook; X (Twitter)	P	N	N	A	–
13	Apr 19, 2024	WBFF; The Baltimore Sun	Kai Jackson	YouTube	P	N	N	P	–
14	Apr 29, 2024	WDCW	Chris Flanagan; Anna-Lysa Gayle	Website; YouTube	P	N	N	A	–
15	Apr 29, 2024	First Baptist Church of Glenarden	Lou Holder	Facebook	P	P	P	A	–
16	Apr 30, 2024	Caucus of African; American Leaders	Justin J. Pearson	Facebook	P	P	N	P	–

=== Fundraising ===
Campaign finance reports as of June 30, 2024
Candidate	Raised	Spent	Cash on hand
Angela Alsobrooks (D)	$12,473,586	$8,913,984	$3,559,602
David Trone (D)	$63,609,667 (Note: $62,471,000 of this total was self-funded by Trone.)	$66,437,974	$195,103
Source: Federal Election Commission

=== Polling ===
Poll source	Date(s) administered	Sample size (Note: Key: A – all adults RV – registered voters LV – likely voters V – unclear)	Margin of error	Angela Alsobrooks	David Trone	Other	Undecided
Concord Public Opinion Partners (Note: Poll sponsored by Education Reform Now Advocacy)	May 2–9, 2024	460 (RV)	± 4.52%	39%	34%	27%	
Emerson College (Note: Poll sponsored by Nexstar Media Group)	May 6–8, 2024	462 (RV)	± 4.5%	47%	44%	9% (Note: Joseph Perez, Robert Houton, and Michael Cobb with 2%; Marcellus Crews, Brian Frydenborg, Scottie Griffin, and Steven Seuferer with 1%; Andrew Wildman with <1%)	– (Note: Undecided respondents were asked which candidate they are leaning towards)
Emerson College	May 6–8, 2024	462 (RV)	± 4.5%	42%	41%	5% (Note: Robert Houton with 2%, Michael Cobb with 1%, and Marcellus Crews, Brian Frydenborg, Scottie Griffin, Joseph Perez, Steven Seuferer, and Andrew Wildman with <1%)	12%
OpinionWorks (Note: Poll sponsored by The Baltimore Sun and WBFF)	April 7–10, 2024	600 (LV)	± 4.0%	38%	50%	–	12%
OpinionWorks	April 7–10, 2024	600 (LV)	± 4.0%	29%	48%	10% (Note: Marcellus Crews, Scottie Griffin, Robert Houton, and Joseph Perez with 2%, Michael Cobb and Andrew Wildman with 1%, and Brian Frydenborg and Steven Seuferer with 0%)	12%
Garin-Hart-Yang Research Group (Note: Poll sponsored by Alsobrooks's campaign)	April 8–10, 2024	600 (LV)	± 4.0%	40%	43%	–	17%
Goucher College (Note: Poll sponsored by The Baltimore Banner)	March 19–24, 2024	408 (LV)	± 4.9%	33%	42%	>1%	24%
SurveyUSA	March 13–18, 2024	550 (LV)	± 5.4%	28%	40%	11% (Note: Michael Cobb, Scottie Griffin, Marcellus Crews, and Joseph Perez with 2%; Brian Frydenborg, Andrew Wildman, and Robert Houton with 1%; Steven Seuferer with 0%)	21%
Braun Research (Note: Poll sponsored by The Washington Post and the University of Maryland)	March 5–12, 2024	525 (RV)	± 4.5%	27%	34%	–	39%
Hickman Analytics (Note: Poll sponsored by Trone's campaign)	February 13–18, 2024	1,000 (LV)	± 3.1%	32%	49%	1%	18%
Emerson College	February 12–13, 2024	543 (RV)	± 3.0%	17%	32%	14% (Note: Joseph Perez with 4%; Stephen Seuferer with 3%; Michael Cobb with 2% "All others (each with 1%)" with 5%)	37%
Hickman Analytics	January 18–24, 2024	1,500 (LV)	± 2.5%	34%	45%	1%	21%
Hickman Analytics	November 27–30, 2023	1,000 (LV)	± 3.1%	34%	41%	1%	25%
RMG Research (Note: Poll sponsored by U.S. Term Limits. Trone has signed the group's term-limit pledge.)	November 15–17, 2023	500 (LV)	± 4.4%	25%	45%	5% (Note: "Someone else" with 4%, "Would not vote" with 1%)	25%
Victoria Research (Note: Poll sponsored by Perry, White, Ross & Jacobson LLC)	November 9–13, 2023	813 (LV)	–	31%	36%	–	18%

=== Results ===
Results by county: Alsobrooks: 40–50%; 50–60%; 60–70%; 70–80%; Trone: 40–50%; 50–60%; 60–70%; 70–80%; 80–90%

Results by precinct: Alsobrooks: 40–50%; 50–60%; 60–70%; 70–80%; 80–90%; >90%; Trone: 30–40%; 40–50%; 50–60%; 60–70%; 70–80%; 80–90%; >90%; Tie: 40–50%; 50%; No data/No votes

Democratic primary results
Party	Candidate	Votes	%
Democratic	Angela Alsobrooks	357,052	53.37%
Democratic	David Trone	286,381	42.80%
Democratic	Joseph Perez	4,688	0.70%
Democratic	Michael Cobb	4,524	0.68%
Democratic	Brian Frydenborg	3,635	0.54%
Democratic	Scottie Griffin	3,579	0.53%
Democratic	Marcellus Crews	3,379	0.51%
Democratic	Andrew Wildman	2,198	0.33%
Democratic	Robert Houton	1,946	0.29%
Democratic	Steve Seuferer	1,664	0.25%
Total votes		669,046	100.00%

== Republican primary ==
=== Campaign ===
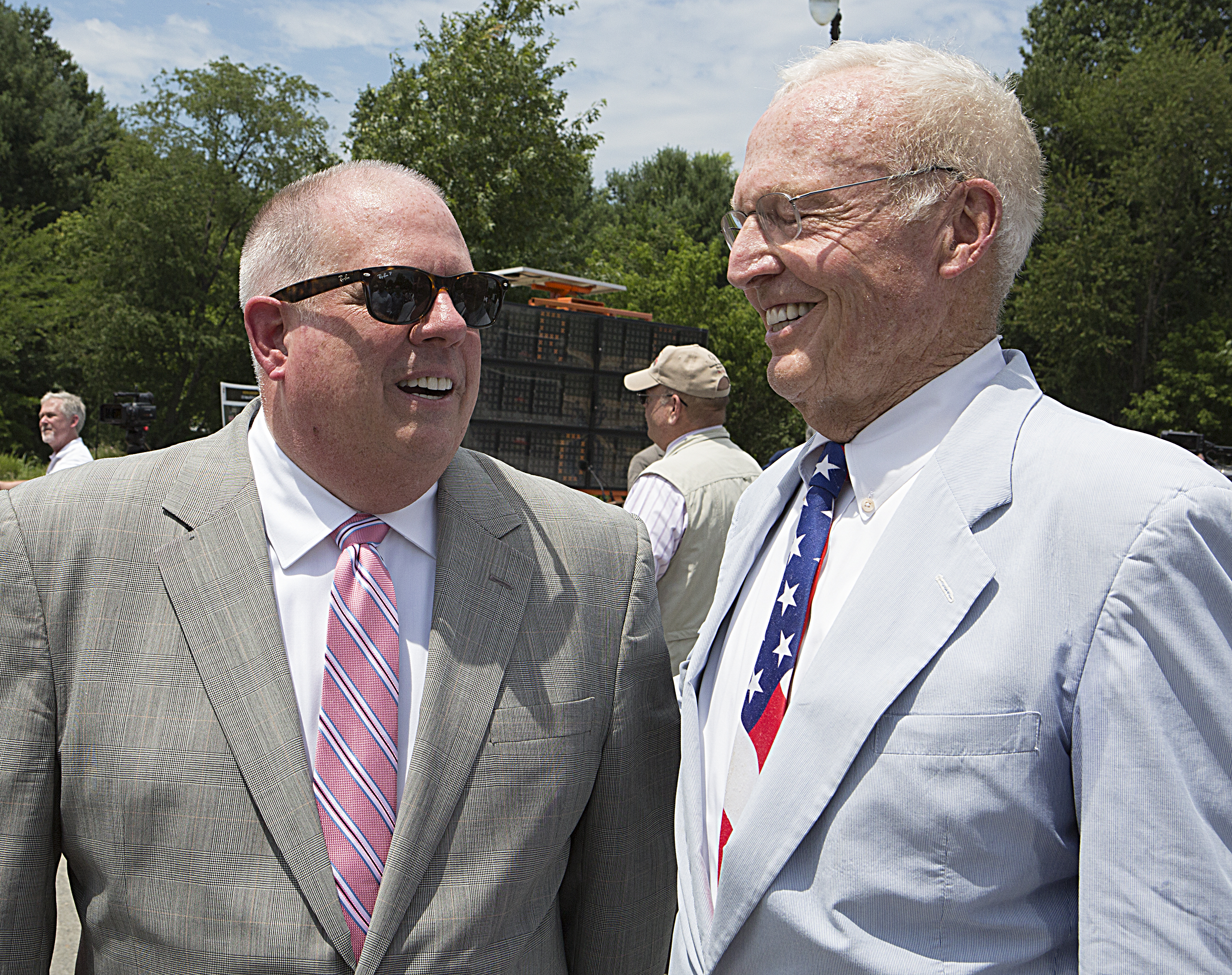
Larry Hogan (left) and Robin Ficker (right) in 2017

Several Republican candidates entered the race, with the most notable being former Maryland governor Larry Hogan. Retired U.S. Air Force brigadier general John Teichert was long viewed as the frontrunner until Hogan's surprise entry into the race hours before the candidate filing deadline, which prompted Teichert to withdraw from the race on February 16 and endorse Hogan, leaving him with only token opposition remaining in the primary. This was two years after Hogan declined to run for U.S. Senate against Chris Van Hollen, and it was presumed that a 2024 presidential bid would be more likely for the former governor.

The Republican primary results had the potential to show the rift within the Maryland Republican Party, whose base had grown frustrated with Hogan for opposing former President Donald Trump. Robin Ficker, a perennial candidate and disbarred attorney, positioned himself as a protest candidate against Hogan by aligning himself with Trump, but opinion polls showed Hogan with a substantial lead over Ficker.

Hogan would end up easily defeating Ficker in the Republican primary on May 14, 2024, becoming the Republican nominee for the seat. Hogan's support came largely from the state's highly-populated and urban counties, which tend to vote for Democratic candidates, while Ficker's support came from its rural areas.

=== Candidates ===
==== Nominee ====
- Larry Hogan, former governor of Maryland (2015–2023)

==== Eliminated in primary ====
- Moe Barakat, business owner and consultant
- Chris Chaffee, homebuilding contractor, perennial candidate, and nominee for U.S. Senate in 2022
- Robin Ficker, former state delegate (1979–1983) and perennial candidate
- Lorie Friend, nurse and candidate for U.S. Senate in 2022
- John Myrick, federal executive consultant
- Laban Seyoum, business owner

==== Withdrawn ====
- Ray Bly, business owner and perennial candidate (ran for U.S. House)
- John Teichert, retired U.S. Air Force brigadier general (endorsed Hogan)
- John Thormann, contractual consultant and candidate for U.S. Senate in 2022 (ran for U.S. House)

==== Declined ====
- Andy Harris, U.S. representative for Maryland's 1st congressional district (2011–present) (ran for re-election)

=== Endorsements ===
Larry Hogan

U.S. executive branch officials

- John Bolton, United States National Security Advisor (2018–2019), United States Ambassador to the United Nations (2005–2006)

U.S. senators

- Marsha Blackburn, Tennessee (2019–present)
- Steve Daines, Montana (2015–present)
- Mitch McConnell, Senate Minority Leader (2021–2025) from Kentucky (1985–present)
- John Thune, Senate Minority Whip (2021–2025) from South Dakota (2005–present)

State legislators

- Steve Hershey, minority leader of the Maryland Senate (2023–present) from the 36th district (2013–present)

Organizations

- Log Cabin Republicans
- National Association of Home Builders
- No Labels
- Republican Main Street Partnership PAC
John Teichert (withdrawn)

U.S. senators

- Kevin Cramer, North Dakota (2019–present)

U.S. representatives

- Mark Green, TN-07 (2019–present)

Statewide elected officials

- Boyd Rutherford, former Maryland lieutenant governor (2015–2023)

State cabinet officials

- Mike Gill, former Maryland Secretary of Commerce (2015–2019; 2022–2023)

State senators

- Edward R. Reilly, 33rd district (2009–2023)
- Johnny Ray Salling, 6th district (2015–present)

State delegates

- Todd Morgan, district 29C (2023–present)
- Stuart Schmidt Jr., district 33B (2023–present)

=== Debates and forums ===
2024 Maryland Republican Senate primary debates
No.	Date	Host	Moderator	Link	Participants				
P Participant A Absent N Non-invitee I Invitee W Withdrawn									
P Participant A Absent N Non-invitee I Invitee W Withdrawn					Barakat	Ficker	Friend	Myrick	Seyoum
1	Mar 11, 2024	Frederick County; Conservative Club	Jonathan Jenkins; Matthew Foldi	Facebook	P	P	P	P	P
2	Mar 21, 2024	League of Women Voters of Maryland	N/A	N/A	A	P	A	P	A
3	Apr 29, 2024	First Baptist Church of Glenarden	Lou Holder	Facebook	A	A	A	P	A

=== Fundraising ===
Campaign finance reports as of June 30, 2024
Candidate	Raised	Spent	Cash on hand
Mohammed Barakat (R)	$2,212	$2,124	$87
Robin Ficker (R)	$4,430,740 (Note: $4,390,018 of this total was self-funded by Ficker)	$4,427,872	$1,198
Lorie Friend (R) (Note: As of April 24, 2024.)	$1,227 (Note: $377 of this total was self-funded by Friend)	$3,699	$0
Larry Hogan (R)	$7,003,571	$4,340,175	$2,663,396
John Myrick (R)	$8,019 (Note: $7,459 of this total was self-funded by Myrick)	$7,359	$660
Source: Federal Election Commission

=== Polling ===
Poll source	Date(s) administered	Sample size	Margin of error	Chris Chaffee	Robin Ficker	Larry Hogan	John Myrick	Other	Undecided
Emerson College	May 6–8, 2024	248 (RV)	± 6.2%	2%	18%	56%	2%	4% (Note: Moe Barakat, Lorie Friend, Laban Seyoum, and John Teichert with 1%)	20%
OpinionWorks	April 7–10, 2024	451 (LV)	± 4.6%	2%	9%	69%	3%	7% (Note: "Someone else" with 2%, Lorie Friend and Laban Seyoum with 1%, and Moe Barakat with <1%)	12%
SurveyUSA	March 13–18, 2024	300 (LV)	± 6.7%	4%	9%	55%	1%	9% (Note: Moe Barakat with 7%, Lorie Friend with 2%, and Laban Seyoum with 0%)	22%
Emerson College	February 12–13, 2024	246 (RV)	± 3.0%	2%	6%	43%	2%	6% (Note: Moe Barakat, Lorie Friend, Laban Seyoum, and John Teichert with 1%)	43%

=== Results ===
Results by county: Hogan: 40–50%; 50–60%; 60–70%; 70–80%; Ficker: 40–50%

Results by precinct: Hogan: 30–40%; 40–50%; 50–60%; 60–70%; 70–80%; 80–90%; >90%; Ficker: 30–40% 40–50%; 50–60%; 60–70%; 70–80%; 80–90%; Friend: 60–70%; 90–100%; Myrick: 60–70%; 90–100%; Barakat: 90–100%; Tie No data/No votes

Republican primary results
Party	Candidate	Votes	%
Republican	Larry Hogan	183,661	64.18%
Republican	Robin Ficker	79,517	27.79%
Republican	Chris Chaffee	9,134	3.19%
Republican	Lorie Friend	5,867	2.05%
Republican	John A. Myrick	4,987	1.74%
Republican	Moe Barakat	2,203	0.77%
Republican	Laban Seyoum	782	0.27%
Total votes		286,151	100.00%

== Third-party and independent candidates ==
=== Candidates ===
==== Declared ====
- Mike Scott (Libertarian), retired U.S. Air Force veteran

==== Declared write-ins ====
- Billy Bridges (Independent), retired military veteran
- Patrick Burke (American Solidarity Party), retired city planner
- Irwin Gibbs (Independent)
- Christy Helmondollar (Independent), sales associate
- Robin Rowe (Independent), programmer

==== Failed to qualify ====
- Emmanuel Osuchukwu (Independent), security guard

==== Withdrawn ====
- Moshe Landman (Green), attorney, mortgage broker, and nominee for SD-39 in 2022 (ran for U.S. House)
- Nancy Wallace (Green), tech consultant, nominee for governor of Maryland in 2022, and nominee for Maryland's 8th congressional district in 2016 (ran for U.S. House)

==== Declined ====
- Cal Ripken Jr., former professional baseball player with the Baltimore Orioles

=== Debates and forums ===
Osuchukwu attended the NARFE Maryland Federation forum on October 24, 2023.

== General election ==
=== Campaign ===
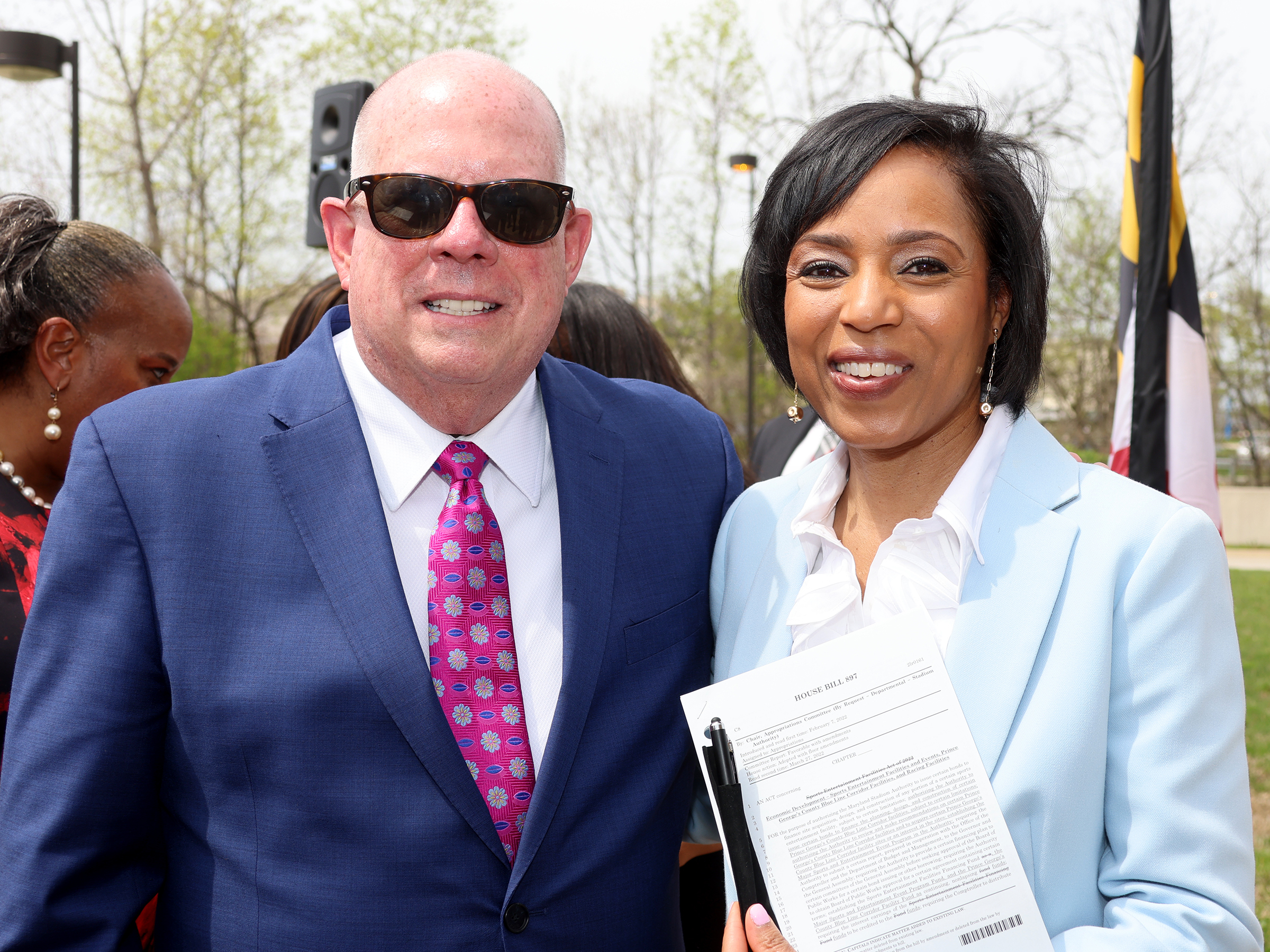
Angela Alsobrooks (right) and Larry Hogan (left) in 2022

The issue of abortion was a major issue in the general election, with Maryland voters set to vote on enshrining reproductive rights into the state constitution alongside the Senate election. Anticipating this, Hogan sought to move to the left of his party by supporting federal legislation to restore the Roe v. Wade decision and the Maryland abortion referendum, though declining to support the Women's Health Protection Act. Alsobrooks promised to cosponsor the Women's Health Protection Act and criticized Hogan for his veto of the Abortion Care Access Act in 2022, which expanded the kinds of medical professionals that could perform abortions and provided $3.5 million in state funding to train these professionals.

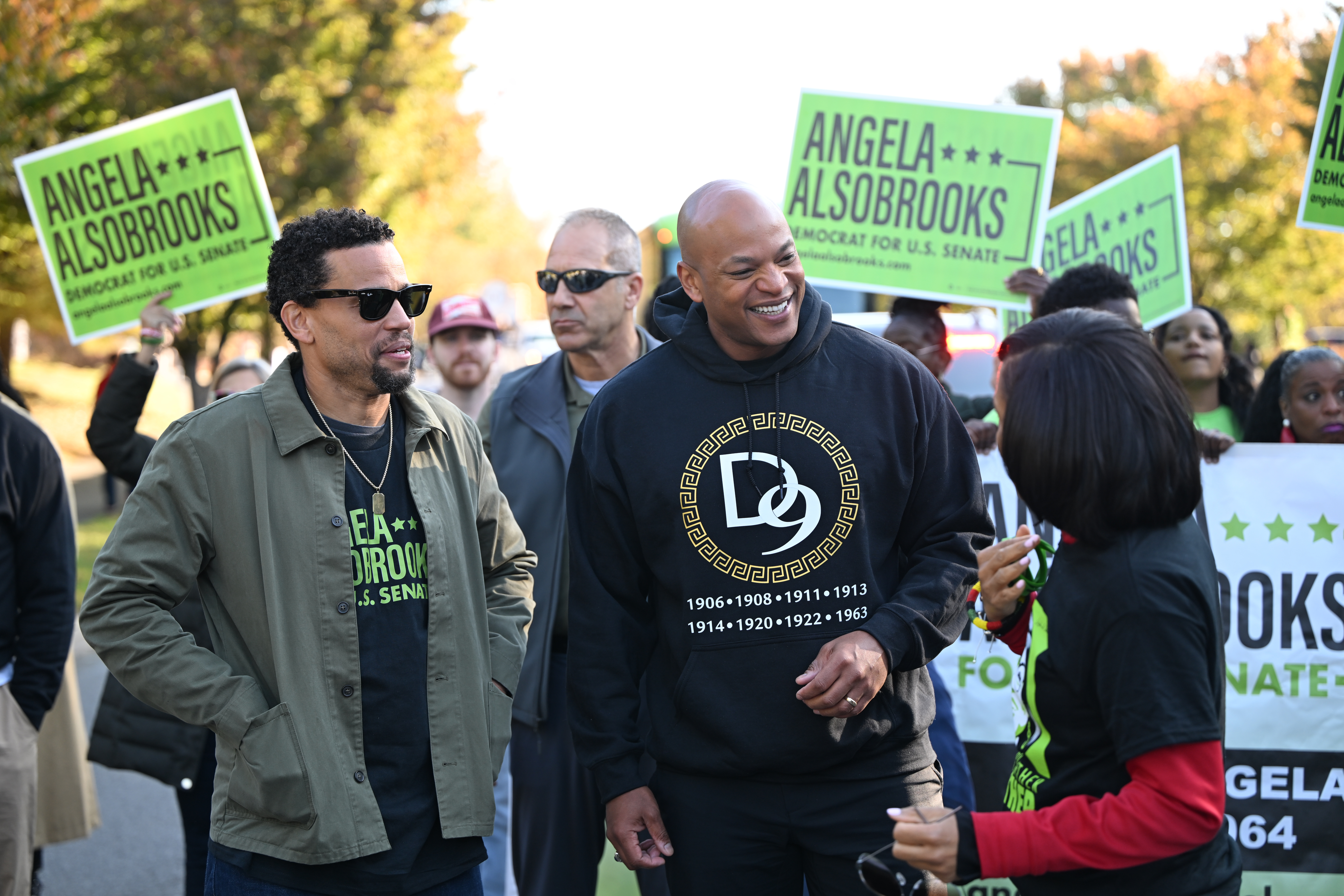
Governor Moore and actor Michael Ealy campaigning with Alsobrooks, 2024

Alsobrooks scrutinized Hogan's legislative record—including his vetoes on legislation to require background checks on firearm sales, increase the minimum wage, provide paid family and medical leave, and expand abortion care—and sought to associate him with generic Republicans. Democrats also attempted to nationalize the race by reminding voters that a Hogan win could cause Republicans to take control of the U.S. Senate, thereby allowing them to block Kamala Harris's agenda and pass Donald Trump's policies. Maryland Governor Wes Moore also played a role in campaigning against Hogan, with several of his top advisors leaving their positions in the Moore administration to form a political action committee called Unity First PAC to support Alsobrooks and other downballot Democratic nominees. Following Joe Biden's withdrawal from the 2024 presidential election, Alsobrooks sought to tie herself closely with Democratic presidential nominee Kamala Harris, believing that her candidacy would have a coattail effect on downballot elections.

Hogan campaigned on the issues of immigration, crime, and public safety in the general election while also relying on his popularity with Maryland voters to win over support from moderate Democrats and unaffiliated voters. He also sought to bring attention to his achievements while governor, including his efforts to cut taxes and his handling of the 2015 Baltimore protests and the COVID-19 pandemic in Maryland. Hogan criticized Alsobrooks's record on fiscal issues and her handling of crime and policing in Prince George's County, saying that crime had increased during her tenure as county executive and highlighting the county's May 2024 Moody's Ratings outlook downgrade from stable to negative as a result of the statewide Blueprint for Maryland's Future implementation.

Hogan's candidacy had the potential to transform the general election into a test of his popularity, among both Democrats, who outnumber registered Republicans 2-to-1 and were key to Hogan's successes in past elections; and Republicans, who may opt against voting in the general election as a result of Hogan's criticism of Trump. Mileah Kromer, a political scientist and pollster at the University of Maryland, Baltimore County, estimated that 25–30% of registered Democrats voted for Hogan in past gubernatorial elections; polling conducted for the Senate election in late September 2024 showed Hogan receiving support from 14 percent of registered Democrats.

In May 2024, Hogan posted on X (formerly Twitter) to say that Americans should "respect the verdict and the legal process," in reference to any decision made in the Donald Trump hush money trial. Later that day, a jury found Trump guilty on all charges. This caused Hogan backlash among some pro-Trump Republicans, most notably including senior Trump campaign advisor Chris LaCivita, who replied to Hogan's post saying that Hogan's campaign had "ended"; as well as Lara Trump, the co-chair of the Republican National Committee (RNC) and daughter-in-law to the former president. Lara Trump said in an interview that "[Hogan] doesn't deserve the respect of anyone in the Republican Party at this point, and quite frankly, anybody in America." She (and later RNC chairman Michael Whatley) also declined to say whether or not the RNC would withhold monetary support from Hogan's campaign; withholding support from Hogan's campaign would have significant implications for the general election, as the Maryland Republican Party is not as well-resourced as the Maryland Democratic Party. Ultimately, in mid-June 2024, former President Donald Trump endorsed Hogan's senatorial campaign, which may help Hogan among Republicans but may also hurt his performance among Democratic voters. Though Hogan publicly rejected Trump's endorsement, it was reported by CNN in October 2024 that Hogan was privately touting the endorsement to donors, believing it would help unify Republicans around his campaign.

Both candidates received extensive support from super PACs. Political action committees supporting Alsobrooks included Women Vote PAC and the Democratic Senatorial Campaign Committee, both of which ran ads criticizing Hogan's record as governor—especially toward the issue of abortion—and emphasizing that a Hogan victory could cause Republicans to take control of the U.S. Senate. Political action committees supporting Hogan, including the National Republican Senatorial Committee and Maryland's Future PAC—which received significant financial support from Republican megadonors Kenneth C. Griffin and Harlan Crow—ran ads criticizing Alsobrooks for improperly benefiting from tax breaks she did not qualify for (which she since pledged to pay back) and claiming that she would support raising Social Security taxes. Libertarian nominee Mike Scott also received support from the newly-established Save Western Culture super PAC, which campaigned against Hogan for his handling of the COVID-19 pandemic and recognizing Biden's victory in the 2020 United States presidential election.

=== Predictions ===
Source	Ranking	As of
The Cook Political Report	Likely D	July 11, 2024
Inside Elections	Likely D	May 9, 2024
Sabato's Crystal Ball	Likely D	April 17, 2024
Decision Desk HQ/The Hill	Safe D	June 8, 2024
Elections Daily	Solid D	May 4, 2023
CNalysis	Solid D	November 21, 2023
RealClearPolitics	Lean D	September 15, 2024
Split Ticket	Safe D	October 23, 2024
538	Solid D	October 23, 2024

=== Post-primary endorsements ===
Angela Alsobrooks (D)

U.S. executive branch officials

- Joe Biden, 46th president of the United States (2021–2025)
- Hillary Clinton, former United States Secretary of State (2009–2013)
- Kamala Harris, 49th vice president of the United States (2021–2025)
- Eric Holder, former U.S. Attorney General (2009–2015)
- April McClain Delaney, former NTIA deputy administrator (2022–2023)
- Barack Obama, 44th president of the United States (2009–2017)

U.S. senators

- Ben Cardin, Maryland (2007–2025)
- Amy Klobuchar, Minnesota (2007–present)
- Carol Moseley Braun, Illinois (1993–1999)
- Gary Peters, Michigan (2015–present)
- Brian Schatz, Hawaii (2012–present)
- Chuck Schumer, Senate Majority Leader (2021–2025) from New York (1999–present)
- Elizabeth Warren, Massachusetts (2013–present)

U.S. representatives

- Hakeem Jeffries, House Minority Leader (2023–present) from NY-08 (2013–present)
- Dutch Ruppersberger, MD-02 (2003–2025)
- David Trone, MD-06 (2019–2025)
- 3 other representatives

Statewide elected officials

- Anthony Brown, Attorney General (2023–present)
- Gretchen Whitmer, Michigan governor (2019–present)

State legislators

- 6 state senators
- 26 state delegates

County officials

- Aisha Braveboy, Prince George's County State's Attorney (2018–present)
- Jessica Fitzwater, Frederick County Executive (2022–present)

Other local officials

Party officials

- Jaime Harrison, chair of the Democratic National Convention (2021–2025)
- Kenneth Ulman, chair of the Maryland Democratic Party (2023–present) and former Howard County Executive (2006–2014)

Individuals

- Harry Dunn, former U.S. Capitol Police officer
- Michael Ealy, actor
- Susie Gelman, former chairwoman of the Israel Policy Forum
- Fatima Goss Graves, president and CEO of the National Women's Law Center
- Kelley Robinson, president of the Human Rights Campaign

Labor unions

- Actors' Equity Association
- American Federation of State, County and Municipal Employees Council 3
- American Federation of Teachers (Note: Maryland and Washington, D.C. chapters)
- Eastern Atlantic States Regional Council of Carpenters
- International Association of Bridge, Structural, Ornamental and Reinforcing Iron Workers Locals 5 and 568
- International Union of Bricklayers and Allied Craftworkers
- Laborers' International Union of North America (Note: Philadelphia/Baltimore/Washington District Council, West Virginia and Appalachian District Council, Mid-Atlantic Region, and Local 202R)
- Maryland State & D.C. AFL-CIO
- Mid-Atlantic Pipe Trades Association
- Maryland State Education Association
- National Association of Government Employees
- National Association of Social Workers
- National Education Association
- National Nurses United
- SEIU Locals 32BJ and 500
- SMART Union
- Transportation Communications International Union
- 3 UNITE HERE locals (Note: Locals 7, 23, and 25)
- 3 United Food and Commercial Workers locals (Note: Locals 27, 400, and 1994 MCGEO)

Organizations

- Asian American Action Fund
- Black Economic Alliance PAC
- Brady PAC
- CASA in Action
- Democratic Majority for Israel
- Democratic Senatorial Campaign Committee
- Everytown for Gun Safety Action Fund
- Feminist Majority PAC
- Friends of the Earth Action
- Giffords
- Human Rights Campaign
- Jewish Democratic Council of America
- League of Conservation Voters Action Fund
- Maryland Democratic Party
- MoveOn
- National Committee to Preserve Social Security and Medicare
- Natural Resources Defense Council Action Fund
- People for the American Way
- Planned Parenthood Action Fund
- Sierra Club
- Vote Common Good

Newspapers

- Baltimore Afro-American
- The Washington Informer
- The Washington Post
Larry Hogan (R)

U.S. executive branch officials

- George W. Bush, 43rd president of the United States (2001–2009)
- Ben Carson, 17th U.S. Secretary of Housing and Urban Development (2017–2021)
- Gary Cohn, 11th Director of the National Economic Council (2017–2018)
- Christopher F. Egan, 15th U.S. Ambassador to the Organisation for Economic Co-operation and Development (2007–2009)
- Ed Gillespie, former Counselor to the President (2007–2009)
- Bobbie Kilberg, former Director of the Office of Public Liaison (1989–1992)
- ~~Donald Trump, 45th president of the United States (2017–2021)~~ (endorsement rejected by Hogan)

U.S. ambassadors

- Ronald Gidwitz, Acting U.S. Ambassador to the European Union (2020–2021) and Belgium (2018–2021)

U.S. senators

- Lamar Alexander, Tennessee (2003–2021)
- Susan Collins, Maine (1997–present)
- Bob Corker, Tennessee (2007–2019)
- John Cornyn, Texas (2002–present)
- Tom Cotton, Arkansas (2015–present)
- Kevin Cramer, North Dakota (2019–present)
- Bill Frist, Tennessee (1995–2007) and former Senate Majority Leader (2003–2007)
- Joe Manchin, West Virginia (2010–2025) (Independent; Democratic until 2024)
- Lisa Murkowski, Alaska (2002–present)
- Mike Rounds, South Dakota (2015–present)
- Rick Santorum, Pennsylvania (1995–2007)
- Eric Schmitt, Missouri (2023–present)
- John Thune, South Dakota (2005–present)
- Thom Tillis, North Carolina (2015–present)
- JD Vance, Ohio (2023–2025)

U.S. representatives

- John Boehner, former Speaker of the U.S. House of Representatives (2011–2015) from OH-08 (1991–2015)
- Eric Cantor, former House Majority Leader (2011–2014) from VA-07 (2001–2014)
- Barbara Comstock, VA-10 (2015–2019)
- Andy Harris, chair of the House Freedom Caucus (2024–present) from MD-01 (2011–present)
- Paul Ryan, former Speaker of the U.S. House of Representatives (2015–2019) from WI-01 (1999–2019)

Statewide officials

- Charlie Baker, Massachusetts governor (2015–2023)
- Mike DeWine, Ohio governor (2019–present)
- Doug Ducey, Arizona governor (2015–2023)
- Bill Haslam, Tennessee governor (2011–2019)
- Brian Kemp, Georgia governor (2019–present)
- Bill Lee, Tennessee governor (2019–present)
- Chris Sununu, New Hampshire governor (2017–2025)
- Bill Weld, Massachusetts governor (1991–1997), Libertarian vice presidential nominee in 2016 (Republican; Libertarian 2016–2019)

State cabinet officials

- David Brinkley, former Secretary of Budget (2015–2023)
- Rona Kramer, former Secretary of Aging (2015–2023) (Democratic)

State legislators

- 7 state senators (1 Democratic)
- 5 state delegates (1 Democratic)

County officials

- J. Charles Smith III, Frederick County State's Attorney (2007–present)
- Steve Schuh, former Anne Arundel County Executive (2014–2018)

Party officials

- David Bossie, member of the Republican National Committee (2016–present)
- Dirk Haire, former chair of the Maryland Republican Party (2016–2022)
- Nicole Beus Harris, chair of the Maryland Republican Party (2022–present)
- Bob Hugin, chair of the New Jersey Republican Party (2021–present)
- Michael Steele, former Republican National Committee chair (2009–2011) and nominee for this seat in 2006

Individuals

- Harlan Crow, real estate developer
- Ann Coulter, conservative commentator
- Sheldon H. Jacobson, professor
- David Keene, former president of the National Rifle Association of America (2011–2013)
- Marty Kemp, Georgia First Lady (2019–present)
- Kari Lake, former KSAZ-TV news anchor
- Dwight Schar, businessman

Labor unions

- Fraternal Order of Police Lodges 35 and 89
- 12 International Association of Fire Fighters locals (Note: Locals F121, 734, 964, 1563, 1715, 1926, 3666, 4269, 4645, 4916, 5302, and 5184)
- International Longshoremen's Association Locals 333 and 1429
- International Union of Police Associations
- Marine Engineers' Beneficial Association
- Maryland Fraternal Order of Police
- National Association of Home Builders

Organizations

- American Conservation Coalition
- International Franchise Association
- Maryland Forward Party
- Maryland Republican Party
- National Federation of Independent Business FedPAC
- U.S. Chamber of Commerce

=== Debates and forums ===
There was some initial uncertainty around when a debate would be held between Alsobrooks and Hogan in the general election. On August 20, the Alsobrooks and Hogan campaigns agreed to a single debate—hosted by MPT and local NBC affiliates, and moderated by Chuck Todd—which was held on October 10, 2024.

2024 United States Senate general election in Maryland debates
No.	Date	Host	Moderator	Link	Democratic	Republican
Key: P Participant A Absent N Non-invitee I Invitee W Withdrawn						
Key: P Participant A Absent N Non-invitee I Invitee W Withdrawn					Alsobrooks	Hogan
1	September 24, 2024	The Spokesman	Antonia Hylton; Lillian Stephens; Aleisha Robinson; Tavon Thomasson	N/A	P	A
2	October 10, 2024	Maryland Public Television	Chuck Todd	C-SPAN	P	P
3	October 22, 2024	The Arc Maryland	Chris Mason-Hale; Tracy Wright; Lianne Brown	YouTube	P	P

=== Fundraising ===
Campaign finance reports as of November 25, 2024
Candidate	Raised	Spent	Cash on hand
Angela Alsobrooks (D)	$30,905,993	$30,395,127	$288,156
Larry Hogan (R)	$12,163,285	$11,760,147	$403,138
Source: Federal Election Commission

=== Polling ===
Aggregate polls

Source of poll aggregation	Dates administered	Dates updated	Angela Alsobrooks (D)	Larry Hogan (R)	Undecided (Note: Calculated by taking the difference of 100% and all other candidates combined.)	Margin
FiveThirtyEight	October 17 – November 3, 2024	November 4, 2024	50.7%	40.3%	9.0%	Alsobrooks +10.4%
RCP	September 16 – November 1, 2024	November 3, 2024	51.5%	39.8%	8.7%	Alsobrooks +11.7%
270toWin	October 9 – November 3, 2024	November 4, 2024	50.8%	40.0%	9.2%	Alsobrooks +10.8%
TheHill/DDHQ	through November 3, 2024	November 5, 2024	53.6%	38.8%	7.6%	Alsobrooks +14.8%
Average			51.7%	39.7%	8.6%	Alsobrooks+12.0%

Poll source	Date(s) administered	Sample size	Margin of error	Angela Alsobrooks (D)	Larry Hogan (R)	Other	Undecided
Concord Public Opinion Partners (Note: Poll sponsored by Education Reform Now Advocacy)	November 1–3, 2024	419 (LV)	± 4.74%	52%	38%	3% (Note: Scott (L) with 3%)	7%
Morning Consult	October 21–30, 2024	468 (LV)	± 5.0%	49%	42%	4%	5%
Chism Strategies	October 28–30, 2024	510 (LV)	± 4.3%	48%	40%	2% (Note: Scott (L) with 2%)	10%
ActiVote	October 7–30, 2024	400 (LV)	± 4.9%	57%	43%	–	–
YouGov (Note: Poll sponsored by the University of Maryland, College Park.)	October 23–27, 2024	500 (LV)	± 5.2%	57%	34%	4% (Note: Scott (L) with 3%; "Other" with 1.3%)	4%
Braun Research	October 17–22, 2024	1,000 (LV)	± 3.6%	52%	40%	4% (Note: Scott (L) with 4%, "Other" with <0.5%)	4% (Note: "No opinion/Skipped" with 4%, "Would not vote" with <0.5%)
Braun Research	October 17–22, 2024	1,000 (RV)	± 3.6%	51%	39%	5% (Note: Scott (L) with 5%, "Other" with <0.5%)	4% (Note: "No opinion/Skipped" with 4%, "Would not vote" with <0.5%)
Emerson College	October 19–21, 2024	865 (LV)	± 3.2%	57%	43%	–	–
Emerson College	October 19–21, 2024	865 (LV)	± 3.2%	54%	40%	–	6%
Morning Consult	October 6–15, 2024	490 (LV)	± 4.0%	51%	38%	2%	9%
University of Maryland, Baltimore County	September 23–28, 2024	863 (LV)	± 3.3%	48%	39%	7% (Note: Scott (L) with 3%; "Some other candidate" with 3%; "Refused" with 1%)	5%
Braun Research	September 19–23, 2024	1,012 (LV)	± 3.5%	51%	40%	4% (Note: Scott (L) with 3%, "Other" with 1%)	5% (Note: "No opinion/Skipped" with 4%, "Would not vote" with 1%)
Braun Research	September 19–23, 2024	1,012 (RV)	± 3.5%	50%	41%	3% (Note: Scott (L) with 3%)	6%
Morning Consult	September 9–18, 2024	474 (LV)	± 4.0%	50%	39%	2%	9%
Public Policy Polling (D)	September 16–17, 2024	543 (RV)	± 4.2%	52%	37%	–	11%
Public Policy Polling (D)	September 16–17, 2024	543 (RV)	± 4.2%	50%	33%	6% (Note: Scott (L) with 6%)	12%
Emerson College	September 12–13, 2024	890 (LV)	± 3.2%	49%	42%	–	9%
Morning Consult	August 30 – September 8, 2024	516 (LV)	± 4.0%	48%	43%	2%	7%
Gonzales Research	August 24–30, 2024	820 (RV)	± 3.5%	46%	41%	1%	11%
Fabrizio Ward (R)/ Impact Research (D) (Note: Poll sponsored by AARP)	August 14–20, 2024	700 (LV)	± 4.0%	46%	46%	1%	7%
	July 21, 2024	Joe Biden withdraws from the presidential election					
Public Policy Polling (D)	June 19–20, 2024	635 (RV)	± 3.9%	48%	40%	–	12%
Public Policy Polling (D)	June 19–20, 2024	635 (RV)	± 3.9%	45%	34%	5% (Note: Scott (L) with 3%; Wallace (G) and Osuchukwu (I) with 1%)	16%
	May 14, 2024	Primary elections held					
Emerson College	May 6–8, 2024	1,115 (RV)	± 2.9%	48%	38%	–	14%
Public Policy Polling (D) (Note: Poll sponsored by EMILY's List, which supports Alsobrooks)	May 6–7, 2024	719 (RV)	± 3.7%	46%	37%	–	17%
OpinionWorks	April 7–10, 2024	1,292 (LV)	± 3.0%	36%	54%	–	10%
Goucher College	March 19–24, 2024	800 (RV)	± 3.5%	40%	44%	–	11%
Braun Research	March 5–12, 2024	1,004 (RV)	± 3.3%	36%	50%	–	15%
Emerson College	February 12–13, 2024	1,000 (RV)	± 3.0%	37%	44%	–	19%
Ragnar Research Partners (R) (Note: Poll sponsored by the National Republican Senatorial Committee, which supports Hogan.)	January 30 – February 1, 2024	600 (LV)	± 4.0%	29%	52%	–	19%
Victoria Research	November 9–13, 2023	813 (LV)	–	36%	42%	–	–

Hypothetical polling

David Trone vs. Larry Hogan

Poll source	Date(s) administered	Sample size	Margin of error	David Trone (D)	Larry Hogan (R)	Undecided
Emerson College	May 6–8, 2024	1,115 (RV)	± 2.9%	49%	38%	14%
Public Policy Polling (D)	May 6–7, 2024	719 (RV)	± 3.7%	47%	37%	16%
OpinionWorks	April 7–10, 2024	1,292 (LV)	± 3.0%	40%	53%	7%
Goucher College	March 19–24, 2024	800 (RV)	± 3.5%	42%	43%	10%
Braun Research	March 5–12, 2024	1,004 (RV)	± 3.3%	37%	49%	14%
Emerson College	February 12–13, 2024	1,000 (RV)	± 3.0%	42%	42%	16%
Ragnar Research Partners (R)	January 30 – February 1, 2024	600 (LV)	± 4.0%	33%	49%	18%
Victoria Research	November 9–13, 2023	813 (LV)	–	49%	34%	–

with Generic Democrat and Generic Republican

Poll source	Date(s) administered	Sample size	Margin of error	Generic Democrat	Generic Republican	Undecided
Public Policy Polling	May 6–7, 2024	719 (RV)	± 3.7%	54%	33%	21%

=== Results ===
State legislative district results

2024 United States Senate election in Maryland
Party	Candidate	Votes	%	±%
Democratic	Angela Alsobrooks	1,650,912	54.64%	−10.22%
Republican	Larry Hogan	1,294,344	42.84%	+12.53%
Libertarian	Mike Scott	69,396	2.30%	+1.30%
Write-in		6,726	0.22%	+0.12%
Total votes		3,021,378	100.00%	
Democratic hold				

==== By county ====
County	Alsobrooks		Hogan		Others		Margin		Total Votes
County	#	%	#	%	#	%	#	%	Total Votes
Allegany	7,396	23.55%	21,811	69.44%	2,204	7.02%	−14,415	−45.89%	31,411
Anne Arundel	137,645	44.35%	164,698	53.06%	8,044	2.59%	−27,053	−8.72%	310,387
Baltimore	212,585	51.71%	188,177	45.77%	10,361	2.52%	24,408	5.94%	411,123
Baltimore City	183,929	79.96%	42,088	18.30%	4,020	1.75%	141,841	61.66%	230,037
Calvert	18,359	34.15%	33,580	62.47%	1,816	3.38%	−15,221	−28.32%	53,755
Caroline	3,790	23.50%	11,534	71.51%	805	4.99%	−7,744	−48.01%	16,129
Carroll	26,180	25.67%	72,049	70.64%	3,762	3.69%	−45,869	−44.97%	101,991
Cecil	13,392	25.82%	35,557	68.55%	2,923	5.64%	−22,165	−42.73%	51,872
Charles	57,893	63.07%	31,941	34.80%	1,956	2.14%	25,952	28.27%	91,790
Dorchester	5,837	35.08%	10,113	60.78%	689	4.14%	−4,276	−25.70%	16,639
Frederick	66,280	42.83%	83,767	54.12%	4,722	3.05%	−17,487	−11.30%	154,769
Garrett	2,423	15.63%	11,966	77.19%	1,113	7.18%	−9,543	−61.56%	15,502
Harford	48,108	32.25%	95,455	63.99%	5,616	3.76%	−47,347	−31.74%	149,179
Howard	103,163	56.75%	75,247	41.39%	3,382	1.86%	27,916	15.36%	181,792
Kent	4,340	39.26%	6,375	57.67%	340	3.08%	−2,035	−18.41%	11,055
Montgomery	340,280	65.84%	169,303	32.76%	7,264	1.41%	170,977	33.08%	516,847
Prince George's	333,021	82.70%	64,550	16.03%	5,112	1.27%	268,471	66.67%	402,683
Queen Anne's	8,204	25.48%	22,842	70.95%	1,150	3.57%	−14,638	−45.47%	32,196
St. Mary's	18,426	31.52%	37,471	64.10%	2,560	4.38%	−19,045	−32.58%	58,457
Somerset	3,368	33.84%	5,953	59.82%	631	6.34%	−2,585	−25.97%	9,952
Talbot	8,778	38.54%	13,393	58.80%	608	2.67%	−4,615	−20.26%	22,779
Washington	21,488	29.85%	46,870	65.10%	3,635	5.05%	−25,382	−35.26%	71,993
Wicomico	17,163	36.93%	27,244	58.61%	2,073	4.46%	−10,081	−21.68%	46,480
Worcester	8,864	27.22%	22,358	68.67%	1,338	4.11%	−13,494	−41.44%	32,560
Total	1,650,912	54.64%	1,294,344	42.84%	76,122	2.52%	356,568	11.80%	3,021,378

Counties that flipped from Democratic to Republican

- Anne Arundel (largest municipality: Glen Burnie)
- Dorchester (largest municipality: Cambridge)
- Frederick (largest municipality: Frederick)
- Kent (largest municipality: Chestertown)
- Talbot (largest municipality: Easton)
- Wicomico (largest municipality: Salisbury)

==== By congressional district ====
Alsobrooks won four of eight congressional districts, with the remaining four going to Hogan, including three that elected Democrats.

District	Alsobrooks	Hogan	Representative
1st	31.22%	64.72%	Andy Harris
2nd	47.98%	49.44%	Dutch Ruppersberger (118th Congress)
2nd	47.98%	49.44%	Johnny Olszewski (119th Congress)
3rd	48.63%	49.02%	John Sarbanes (118th Congress)
3rd	48.63%	49.02%	Sarah Elfreth (119th Congress)
4th	81.75%	16.89%	Glenn Ivey
5th	58.27%	39.43%	Steny Hoyer
6th	42.64%	53.78%	David Trone (118th Congress)
6th	42.64%	53.78%	April McClain Delaney (119th Congress)
7th	72.79%	25.04%	Kweisi Mfume
8th	67.43%	31.30%	Jamie Raskin

== Notes ==
Partisan clients

== See also ==
- 2024 United States presidential election in Maryland
  - 2024 Maryland Democratic presidential primary
  - 2024 Maryland Republican presidential primary
- 2024 United States House of Representatives elections in Maryland
