= National Kitchen & Bath Association =

Not-for-profit trade association

- Abbreviation: NKBA
- Formation: 1963
- Founder: Leon Raider
- Type: Nonprofit organization
- Headquarters: Bethlehem, Pennsylvania, United States
- Members: 14,000 companies
- Chairman: Kerrie Kelly
- Chief Executive Officer: Bill Darcy
- Website: www.nkba.org

The National Kitchen & Bath Association (NKBA) is a not-for-profit trade association that represents the kitchen and bath industry. It has almost 14,000 member companies across North America and represents almost 55,000 industry professionals. Established in 1963 as a network of kitchen dealers, it has grown into a broader association of distributors, retailers, remodelers, manufacturers, fabricators, cabinet and appliance installers, designers, and other professionals. The NKBA's certification program offers continuing education and career development and includes designers and professionals in all segments of the kitchen and bath industry.

The organization is a leading advocate of Universal design, the principles which allow best use of kitchens and baths by disabled and aging residents.

== History ==
The organization was founded near Philadelphia in 1963, and was originally known as the American Institute of Kitchen Dealers. The founding was inspired by an open letter written by Leon Raider of Kitchen Kompact, a cabinet company founded in 1937. H. Dean Church was the group's first president.

Its goals of "education, consumer awareness and networking" have remained consistent over the years. Within six months, the group was conducting its first training sessions. The organization sponsored its first independent trade show and convention in New York in 1965, attracting 1473 people representing 361 retailers and 128 manufacturers and distributors.

The group conducted its first kitchen design competition in 1965, which drew 30 entries and was judged by a panel that included the editor of McCall's magazine. The group merged with the National Kitchen Distributors Association in 1966. That same year, its conference included the first session on use of computers for management and accounting in the kitchen industry. It began certifying kitchen designers in 1968. Robert Weiland, a founding member, was the first "Certified Kitchen Designer". Today, there are approximately 1500. In 1972, the group began collaborating with the University of Illinois Small Homes Council to develop technical manuals for the industry.

The group formed its first Canadian chapter in 1977. It later organized affiliates in New Zealand and Australia. In 1978, it began offering a week long business management training program in cooperation with the University of Notre Dame. The name was changed to the National Kitchen & Bath Association in 1983.

Its first African American president, Joshua McClure, was elected in 1974, and its first woman president, Martha Kerr, was elected in 1985. In 1987, the NKBA partnered with Auburn University to create its first accredited college program, and Ed Yeargan received the first Bachelor of Science degree in Kitchen and Bath Design the following year.

In November 2018, the National Kitchen & Bath Association unveiled their Global Connect Initiative with the goal of connecting professionals in the kitchen and bath industry across the globe.

== Leadership ==
The 2026 chairman is Kerrie Kelly. The vice chair is Scott Edmunds. The secretary and treasurer is Michael Gross.

== Kitchen & Bath Industry Show (KBIS) ==
In 1964, the American Institute of Kitchen Dealers (now NKBA) launched its first Kitchen Show and drew approximately 24 exhibitors and 250 attendees. In 1981, the AIKD Kitchen Show changed its name to the Kitchen & Bath Industry Show (KBIS). That show, initially a very small gathering, has grown to be the centerpiece of North America's Kitchen and Bath industry. Since 2014, the show has been held in conjunction with the International Builders' Show (IBS), sponsored by the National Association of Home Builders (NAHB). Other construction-related trade shows are held at the same time, and the coordinated events are called Design & Construction Week. In 2025, the National Kitchen & Bath Association held their largest show as of yet, with over 43,000 attendees and nearly 700 exhibitors.

== Research ==
In August 2016, the Association published its study, "Size of Kitchens in New U.S. Single Family Homes" that found the average kitchen in newly built single-family homes is 161 square feet, or just under 13 feet by 13 feet.

In January 2017, the NKBA released its "Estimated Market Value for the Kitchen and Bath Remodeling and New Residential Construction Markets" report that found that the $134 billion industry is segmented into a kitchen and bath remodel and replacement market of $85 billion for existing homes, and a similar market for new homes of $48.6 billion.

That same month the Association released a member survey "2017 Kitchen & Bath Design Trends Report" that highlighted the year's popular trends.

In March 2026, the NKBA released their research on how "Key Demographic Factors Will Drive K&B Remodeling Growth in 2026" that included insights into specific demographic factors that will impact kitchen and bath remodeling.

== Training of Skilled Labor ==
In January 2017, the NKBA launched its "Trade UP" initiative to encourage students to seek careers in the design, construction, and manufacturing fields.

In early 2026, The NKBA launched its student mentor program which allowed for mentors and mentees to be matched through a questionnaire.

== Publications ==
In July 2016, the NKBA relaunched its quarterly magazine now rebranded as NKBA Innovation+Inspiration. It is published by SGC Horizon publications.

The NKBA has published books about kitchen and bath design for decades. Its most comprehensive work is the nine volume Professional Resource Library, published in conjunction with John Wiley & Sons, which totals 3024 pages.

In March 2022, the NKBA released the fourth edition of their Kitchen & Bath Planning Guidelines
