= Sue Ward =

Sue Ward may refer to:

- Sue Cashman, née Ward, Irish camogie player
- Sue Fryer Ward (1935–2014), American elder rights activist

== See also ==
- Susan Ward (born 1976), American actress and model
- Susanne Ward (born 1974), Danish sailor
