= Steve Greenberg (television personality) =

Steve Greenberg (born December 20, 1958) is an American national TV personality dubbed "The Innovation Insider" who showcases gadgets, inventions, and other innovative products. Greenberg is a new product scout and the author of Gadget Nation: A Journey Through the Eccentric World of Invention, the book that features more than 100 off-beat gadgets and the inventors behind them. He was born in Paterson, New Jersey, and currently lives in Miami, Florida and New York City

Greenberg’s innovation insights are routinely featured both in-print and on-camera. He can be seen monthly on NBC's Today Show. He is also a frequent guest on The Dr. Oz Show and HSN. In the past, Steve has appeared on CBS’s Early Show, ABC's World News This Morning and World News Now, and Fox’s Fox & Friends. His "Innovation Insider" features appear in publications including The Miami Herald, Air Currents magazine, ROOMS magazine, Smart Homeowner magazine, Backyard Living, Log Home Living, and HomeToys.com. Steve is often a speaker and/or judge at national and international invention/new product events including FutureVision and Japan’s highly acclaimed CEATEC.

For three years, Greenberg could be seen every weeknight demonstrating innovative products on the Discovery Channel's Your New House, and for six years he traveled the country showcasing the latest in home design, construction, and trends on HGTV's Dream Builders. For five years, HGTV used Greenberg’s reporting skills for coverage of the hottest new home improvement products at NAHB’s International Builders' Show. Greenberg has also been a judge for Hammacher Schlemmer’s "Search For Invention” contest.

Before he made his beat innovation, Greenberg was a full-time television news reporter. While working at the CBS-owned station WFOR-TV in Miami, he traveled to Cuba five times, covered Hurricane Andrew, followed Hurricane Emily to the Carolinas, and reported stories in Mexico, Honduras, the Bahamas, and around the U.S. Greenberg’s reports have been seen on CBS's morning newscast and routinely on CBS's national news feed service.

Greenberg has been honored with 12 Emmy Awards. He has received the highest broadcast national award from the American Heart Association and he has received special recognition from the Florida Medical Association for his coverage of the HIV Haitians detained at Cuba's Guantanamo Bay Naval Base. Greenberg also took first place in the Sunshine State Awards for feature reporting. His educational kids' programs – Doc Steve's Amazing Science Seekers, Baby Animals, Mammals & More, and Gators, Crocs & Other Yucky Swamp Creatures – have all received numerous honors and endorsements from teacher/parent organizations.

Greenberg co-hosted the Food Network series Invention Hunters with partner/co-host Patrick Raymond.

Greenberg is a monthly contributor on NBC's Today Show.
