= Steven Greenberg =

Steve or Steven Greenberg may refer to:

- Steve Greenberg (businessman) (born 1971), Illinois Congressional candidate, businessman, and former professional hockey player
- Steve Greenberg (record producer), owner of S-Curve Records
- Steve Greenberg (television personality) (born 1960), "Innovation Insider"
- Steven Greenberg (musician) (born 1950), writer and producer of "Funkytown"; and owner of October Records
- Steven Greenberg (rabbi) (born 1956), openly gay Orthodox rabbi

== See also ==
- Stephen Greenberg, also known as "Steve"
