= Carmel Roques =

Maryland Secretary of Aging

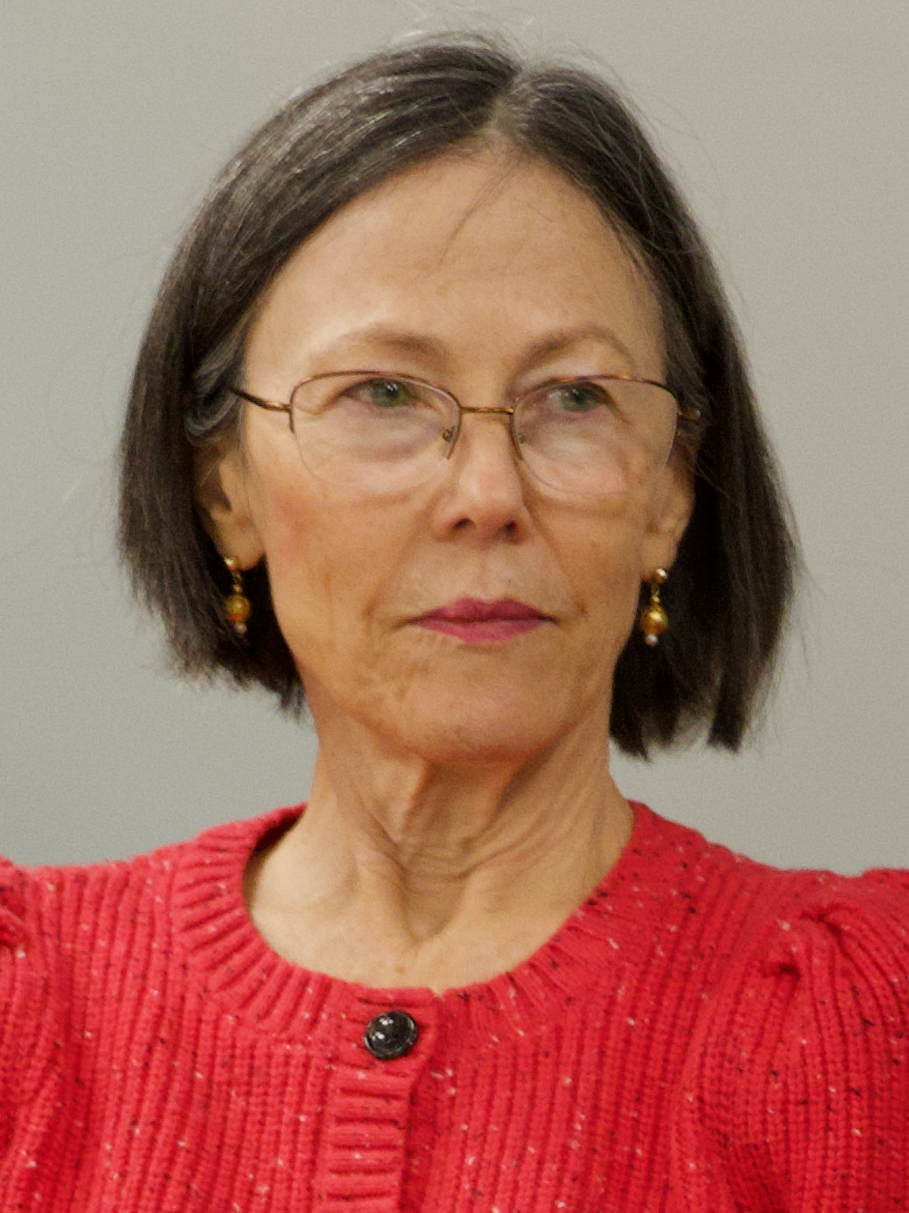

Secretary of the Maryland Department of Aging
- Incumbent
- Assumed office February 14, 2023
- Governor: Wes Moore
- Preceded by: Rona E. Kramer

Personal details
- Education: Mills College (BA); University of Chicago (MA)
- Occupation: Health care administrator

Carmel Roques is an American social worker and health care administrator, serving since 2023 as Maryland's Secretary of Aging.
