= Rona E. Kramer =

American politician

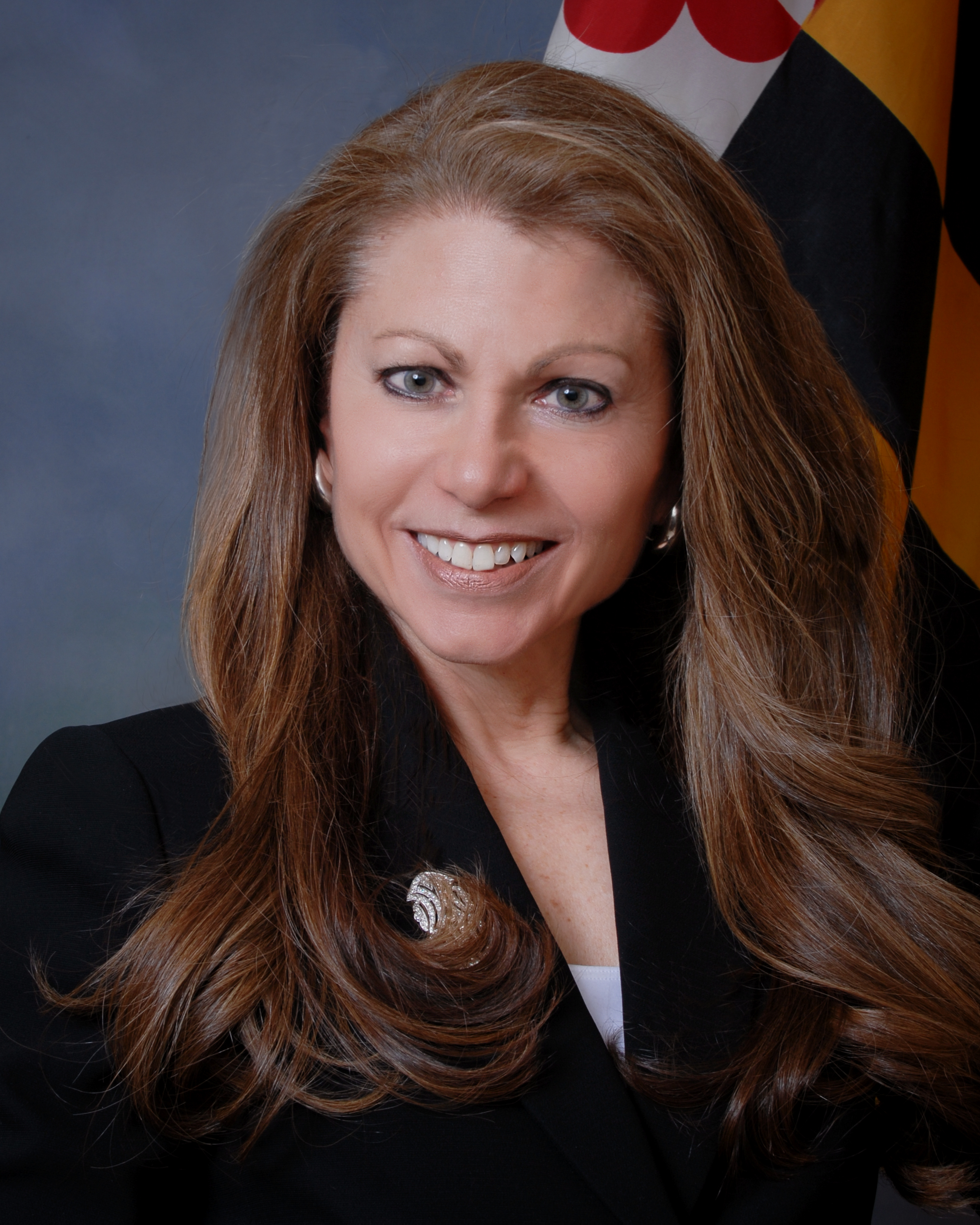

Secretary of the Maryland Department of Aging
- In office January 21, 2015 – January 18, 2023; Acting: January 21, 2015 – March 13, 2015
- Governor: Larry Hogan
- Preceded by: Gloria G. Lawlah
- Succeeded by: Carmel Roques

Member of the Maryland Senate from the 14th district
- In office January 8, 2003 – January 12, 2011
- Preceded by: None (Redistricting)
- Succeeded by: Karen S. Montgomery
- Constituency: Montgomery County

Personal details
- Born: August 16, 1954 (age 72) Washington, D.C., U.S.
- Party: Democratic
- Relations: Sidney Kramer (father); Benjamin F. Kramer (brother)
- Children: 2
- Occupation: Businesswoman

Rona E. Kramer (born August 16, 1954) is an American politician who served as the Maryland Secretary of Aging under Governor Larry Hogan from 2015 to 2023. She was previously a member of the Maryland Senate from 2003 to 2011.

== Early life and education ==
Kramer was born in Washington, D.C., on August 16, 1954, one of three children of eventual Montgomery County Executive Sidney Kramer and his wife Betty Mae. She grew up in Montgomery County, Maryland, where she graduated from John F. Kennedy High School. Kramer later attended the University of Maryland, College Park, where she earned a B.A. degree in law enforcement in 1976, and the University of Baltimore School of Law, where she earned her J.D. degree in 1979. She was admitted to the Maryland Bar in 1980.

== Career ==
After graduating from the University of Baltimore, Kramer worked as an entrepreneur in shopping mall management. She also served as the president of the Montgomery County Chamber of Commerce from 1992 to 1993.

In 2002, Kramer ran for Maryland Senate in District 14, which had no incumbent senator following redistricting. In the Democratic primary, she defeated state delegate Tod David Sher and former delegate Mathew Mossburg, and defeated Republican businessman Jorge Ribas in the general election.

=== Maryland Senate ===
Kramer was sworn into the Maryland Senate on January 8, 2003, where she was described by The Baltimore Sun as being a "socially moderate, business-oriented lawmaker". She also described herself as a fiscal conservative.

Kramer supported a bill giving the legislature veto power over the failed Baltimore Gas and Electric and Constellation Energy merger, capping electricity rate increases, and the limited repeal of the death penalty in 2009. Kramer opposed proposals to repeal the state's computer services tax, legalize commercial slot machines, and prevent Medicaid fraud.

Kramer unsuccessfully ran for re-election in 2010, losing to state delegate Karen S. Montgomery. Following her loss, she worked as the senior vice president and general counsel at Kramer Enterprises, a commercial real estate company owned by her father.

=== Maryland Secretary of Aging ===
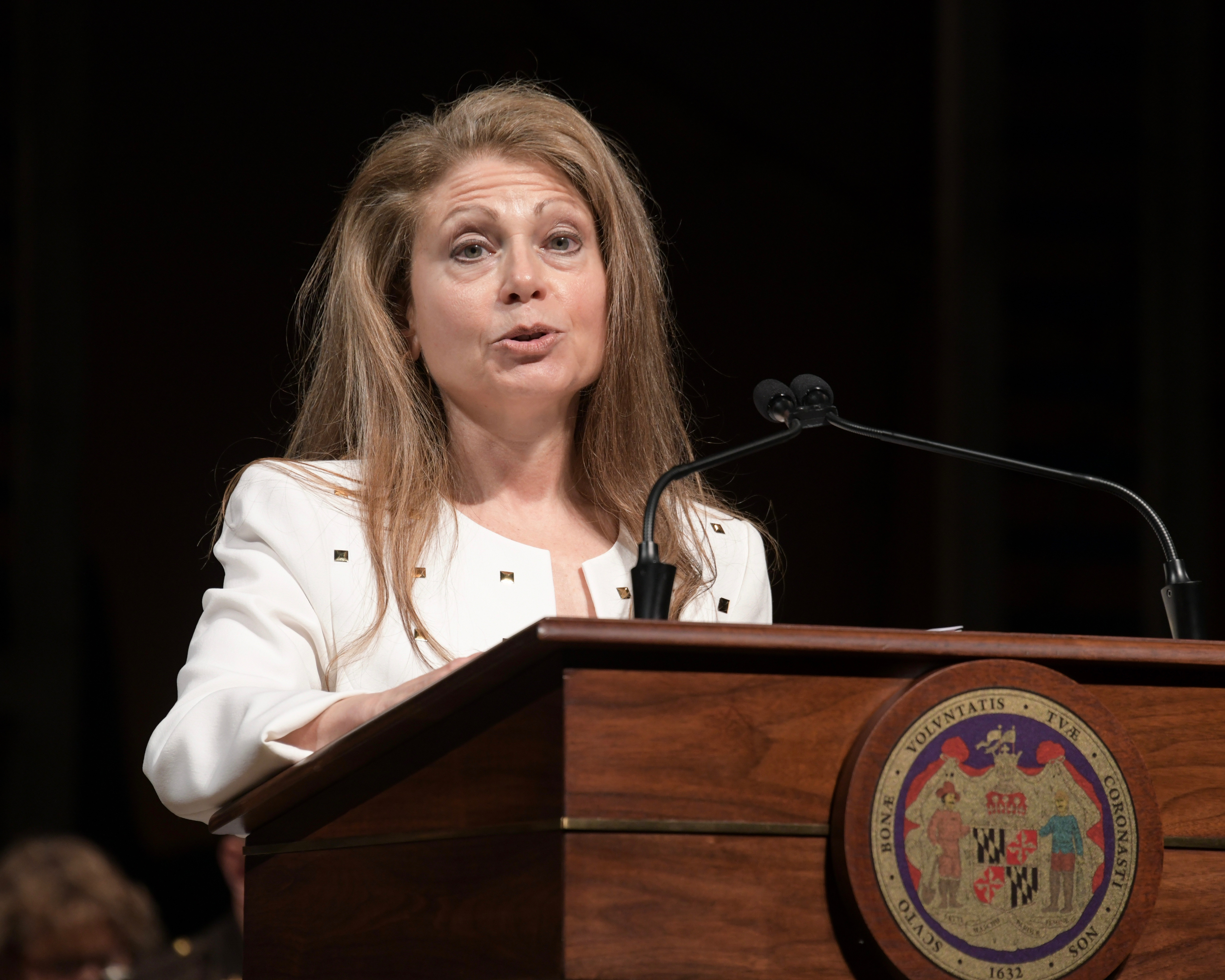
Kramer as Maryland Secretary of Aging, 2018

On January 8, 2015, Governor-elect Larry Hogan named Kramer as his Secretary of Aging. She was one of several Democrats to serve in his cabinet. Kramer's nomination was unanimously approved by the Maryland Senate on March 6, 2015.

In this position, Kramer oversaw the launch of the "My Groceries to Go!" supplemental food program and the state's durable medical equipment reuse program. During the COVID-19 pandemic, she oversaw the rollout of COVID-19 vaccines to Maryland's senior populations.

=== Post-secretary career ===
During the 2024 United States Senate election in Maryland, Kramer was a co-chair of Democrats for Hogan.

== Personal life ==
Kramer is a single mom and has two daughters. Together, they live in Olney, Maryland. Kramer is Jewish.

== Electoral history ==
Maryland Senate District 14 Democratic primary election, 2002
Party	Candidate	Votes	%
Democratic	Rona E. Kramer	5,369	46.4
Democratic	Tod David Sher	4,900	42.3
Democratic	Matthew Mossburg	1,314	11.3

Maryland Senate District 14 Democratic election, 2002
Party	Candidate	Votes	%
Democratic	Rona E. Kramer	22,938	60.7
Republican	Jorge Ribas	14,773	39.1
Write-in		51	0.1

Maryland Senate District 14 Democratic election, 2006
Party	Candidate	Votes	%
Democratic	Rona E. Kramer (incumbent)	22,938	67.8
Republican	Frank Hackenberg	12,733	32.1
Write-in		53	0.1

Maryland Senate District 14 Democratic primary election, 2010
Party	Candidate	Votes	%
Democratic	Karen S. Montgomery	4,973	50.6
Democratic	Rona E. Kramer (incumbent)	4,857	49.4
