= Maryland Department of Aging =

Administrative department of the Maryland state government

Agency overview
- Formed: 1998; 28 years ago
- Jurisdiction: State of Maryland
- Headquarters: 301 West Preston Street, Baltimore, Maryland
- Annual budget: $64.8 million
- Agency executives: Carmel Roques, Secretary of Aging; Jennifer Crawley, Deputy Secretary of Aging; Ian Edwards, Chief of Staff
- Parent agency: State of Maryland
- Website: aging.maryland.gov

The Maryland Department of Aging (MDoA) is an administrative department of the Maryland state government responsible for providing supportive services to older Marylanders, adults with disabilities, their families and their caregivers. Since 2023, it has been led by Secretary Carmel Roques.

== History ==
In 1959, Maryland established the State Coordinating Commission on the Problems of the Aging, which was later renamed to the Commission on the Aging in 1971. In 1975, the Commission on the Aging and the Governor's Coordinating Office on Problems of the Aging, established by Governor Marvin Mandel in the year prior, merged to form the Office of Aging. In July 1998, the Office of Aging was restructured as the Maryland Department of Aging.

== Structure ==
=== Commission on Aging ===
The Commission on Aging is tasked with reviewing and making recommendations for statewide programs and activities to the Secretary of Aging. It consists of thirteen members–eleven citizens and two nonvoting members–who are appointed by the Governor of Maryland to four-year terms.

=== Financial Review Committee ===
The Financial Review Committee reviews and makes recommendations for the financial condition of continuing care providers who are experiencing financial difficulty. It consists of seven members appointed by the Secretary of Aging to serve three-year terms, and a Chairman elected by the committee.

=== Interagency Committee on Aging Services ===
The Interagency Committee on Aging Services plans and coordinates the delivery of services to Maryland's elderly population. It consists of the Secretaries of the Maryland Department of Aging, the Maryland Department of Disabilities, the Maryland Department of Health, the Maryland Department of Housing and Community Development, the Maryland Department of Human Resources, the Maryland Department of Labor, and the Maryland Department of Transportation.

=== Oversight Committee ===
The Oversight Committee on Quality of Care in Nursing Homes and Assisted Living Facilities evaluates progress in improving the quality of nursing home and assisted living facility care statewide. It is chaired by the Secretary of Aging and consists of 23 members.

== Secretaries of Aging ==
Name	Years in Office	Governor
Carmel Roques	2023–present	Wes Moore
Rona E. Kramer	2015–2023	Larry Hogan
Gloria G. Lawlah	2007–2015	Martin O'Malley
Jean Roesser	2003–2007	Bob Ehrlich
Sue Fryer Ward	1998–2003	Parris Glendening
