= Sue Fryer Ward =

First Maryland Secretary of Aging

1st Secretary of Aging of Maryland
- In office 1998–2003
- Governor: Parris Glendening
- Preceded by: Office established
- Succeeded by: Jean Roesser

Personal details
- Born: Sue Elleanore Fryer; October 28, 1935 Albuquerque, New Mexico, U.S.
- Died: June 22, 2014 (aged 78) Annapolis, Maryland, U.S.
- Spouse: Archibald Ward (m. 1959; died 2000)
- Children: 2
- Occupation: Elder rights activist

Sue Fryer Ward (October 28, 1935 – June 22, 2014) was an American elder rights activist who served as the first secretary of the Maryland Department of Aging. Trained as a social worker, Ward spent several decades as a public servant and advocate for the needs of elders. In 2010, she was honored as a Social Work Pioneer by the National Association of Social Workers.

== Early life and education ==
Sue F. Ward was born Sue Elleanore Fryer in Albuquerque, New Mexico, in 1935. She was the younger daughter of Ione Pierce and E. Reeseman Fryer. Her father worked for the Bureau of Indian Affairs, and the family traveled across the country and the world throughout her childhood, with Sue attending more than a dozen different schools during her elementary and junior high school years. A decade of her childhood was spent in Arizona, which would influence her later work as an elder rights advocate; she said she was inspired by the respect with which the Navajo treated their elders.

After graduating from Western High School in Washington, D.C., she attended the College of William & Mary, spending a year of her studies at the American University of Beirut and obtaining a bachelor's in government in 1957. After starting graduate school at McGill University, she moved to Utah to finish her studies at the University of Utah, where she graduated with a master's in social work in 1960.

== Career ==
Having settled back in the Washington area, in the Maryland suburbs, Ward became active in Democratic politics. In 1978, she ran for Congress against Republican Rep. Marjorie Holt, but she failed to defeat the incumbent — her daughter later said she knew it was a lost cause, but "she didn't think elections should go unchallenged." She also drove a school bus and became an active volunteer in this period.

While Ward was active in advocating for a range of human and civil rights causes, she is best known for her work as an elder rights activist. She served older Marylanders as a social worker and government servant, and was at various times president of the National Associations of Area Agencies and State Units on Aging, the Maryland Gerontological Association, and the Commission on Legal Problems of the Elderly.

From 1982 to 1991, she led the Prince George's County Department of Aging. In 1992, she was hired as director of Prince George's Department of Family Services. Then, in 1995, she was chosen as director of the Maryland Department of Aging. In 1998, when Governor Parris Glendening incorporated the department into his cabinet, she was elevated to the role of the state's first secretary of the Department of Aging.

Ward served as secretary until 2003. In this capacity, she fought to preserve social service organizations and retain autonomy for these programs. She battled budget crises, advocating for the importance of elder services, and worked to encourage and empower social workers.

After leaving government, she worked for the National Committee to Preserve Social Security and Medicare as the organization's grassroots director until 2011, when health problems forced her to retire despite her desire to continue working.

Among various awards for her work, Ward was honored as a Social Work Pioneer by the National Association of Social Workers in 2010. She died in Annapolis in 2014, at age 78. The following year, she was named to the Maryland Women's Hall of Fame.

== Personal life ==
She was married to the sociologist Archibald Ward from 1959 until his death in 2000. They had two daughters. Archibald was 23 years her senior, and her work in elder advocacy became personal as she cared for him in his old age, as well as for her mother, who had dementia.
