= First Baptist Church of Glenarden =

Coordinates: 38.88276°N 76.77974°W

First Baptist Church of Glenarden International
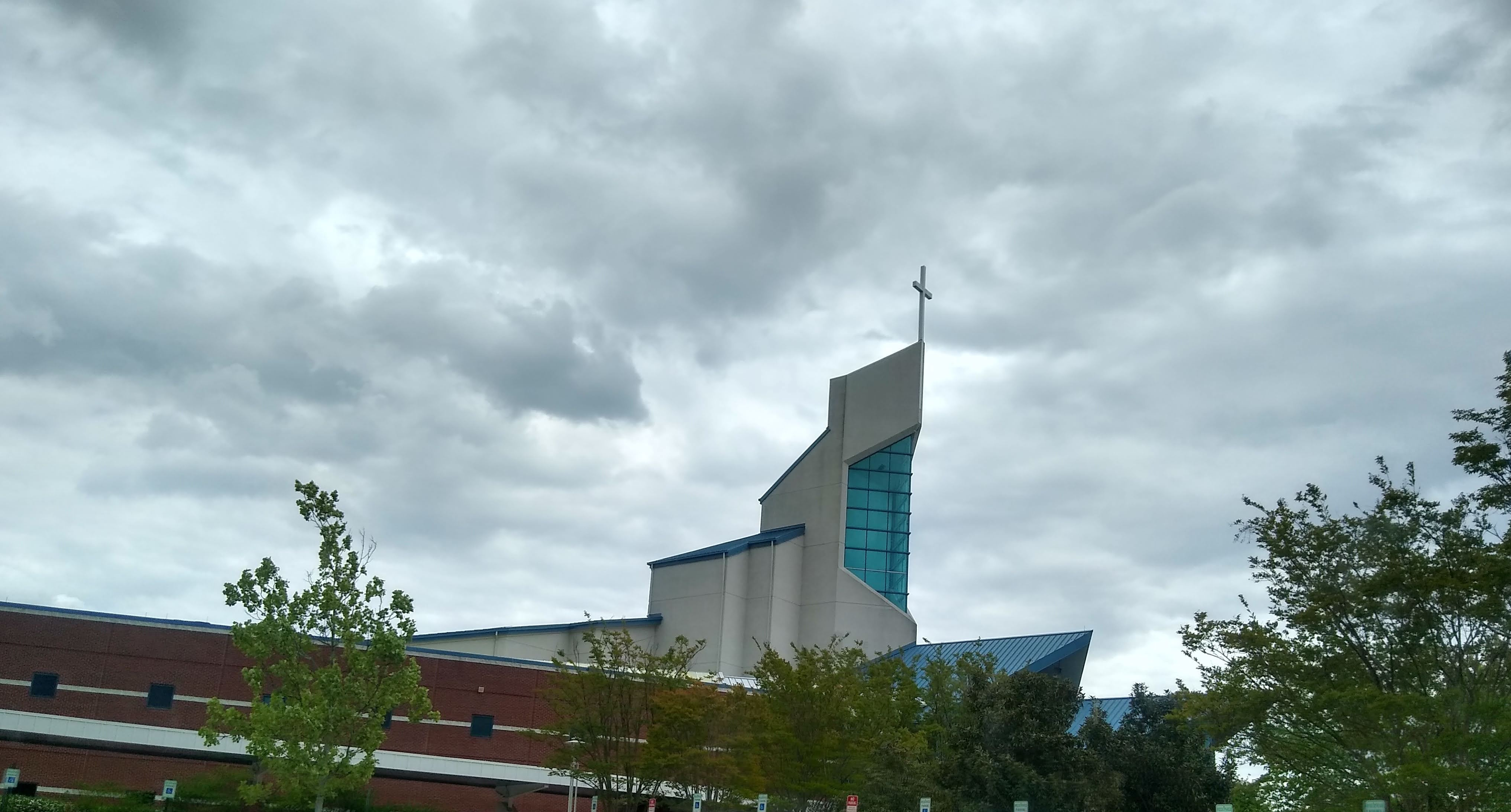
- First Baptist Church of Glenarden International
- Location: Upper Marlboro, Maryland
- Country: United States
- Denomination: Baptist
- Website: fbcglenarden.org

History
- Founded: 1917
- Founder(s): Robert Warren and his wife

Architecture
- Style: Contemporary/Modern

First Baptist Church of Glenarden International or FBCG is a Baptist Evangelical megachurch located in Upper Marlboro, Maryland. It is affiliated with Converge. Weekly church attendance was 12,000 people in 2024. The senior pastor is John K. Jenkins Sr.

== History ==
The church has its origins in a 1917 house Bible study group led by Robert Warren and his wife. In 1920 it opened its first building in Glenarden. In 1989, John K. Jenkins Sr. became the senior pastor of the 500-member church. In 2007, it dedicated a new building in Upper Marlboro including a 4,000-seat auditorium.

In 2012, it won its third Hoodie Award for Best African American Church for its positive influence in its community. In 2018, it inaugurated a community center with a gymnasium and a health club. In 2021, it hosted a COVID-19 vaccination clinic in its community center.

According to a church census released in 2024, it claimed a weekly attendance of 12,000 people.

== Beliefs ==
The Church has a Baptist confession of faith and is a member of Converge.

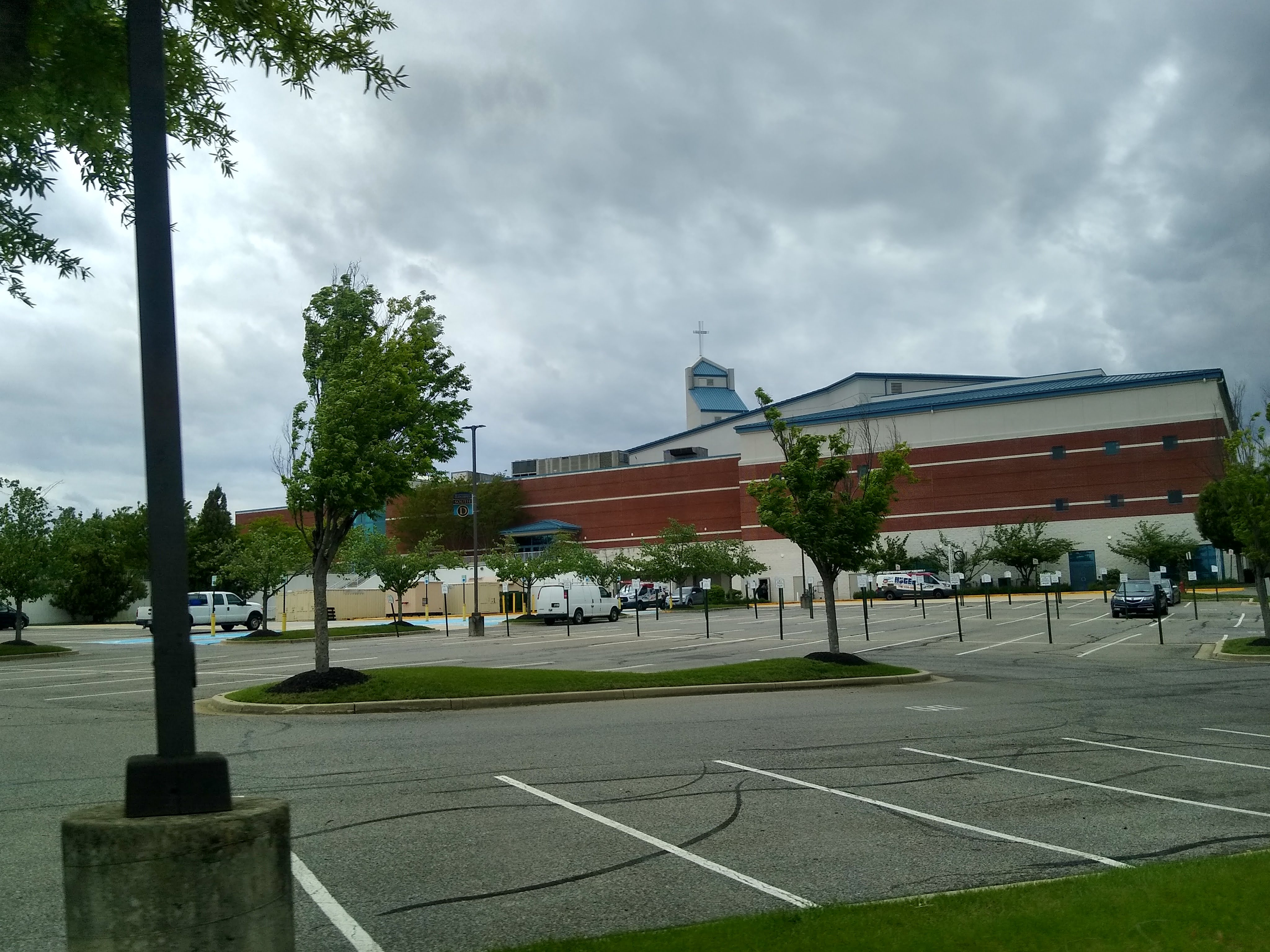
Rear view of FBC Glenarden main campus

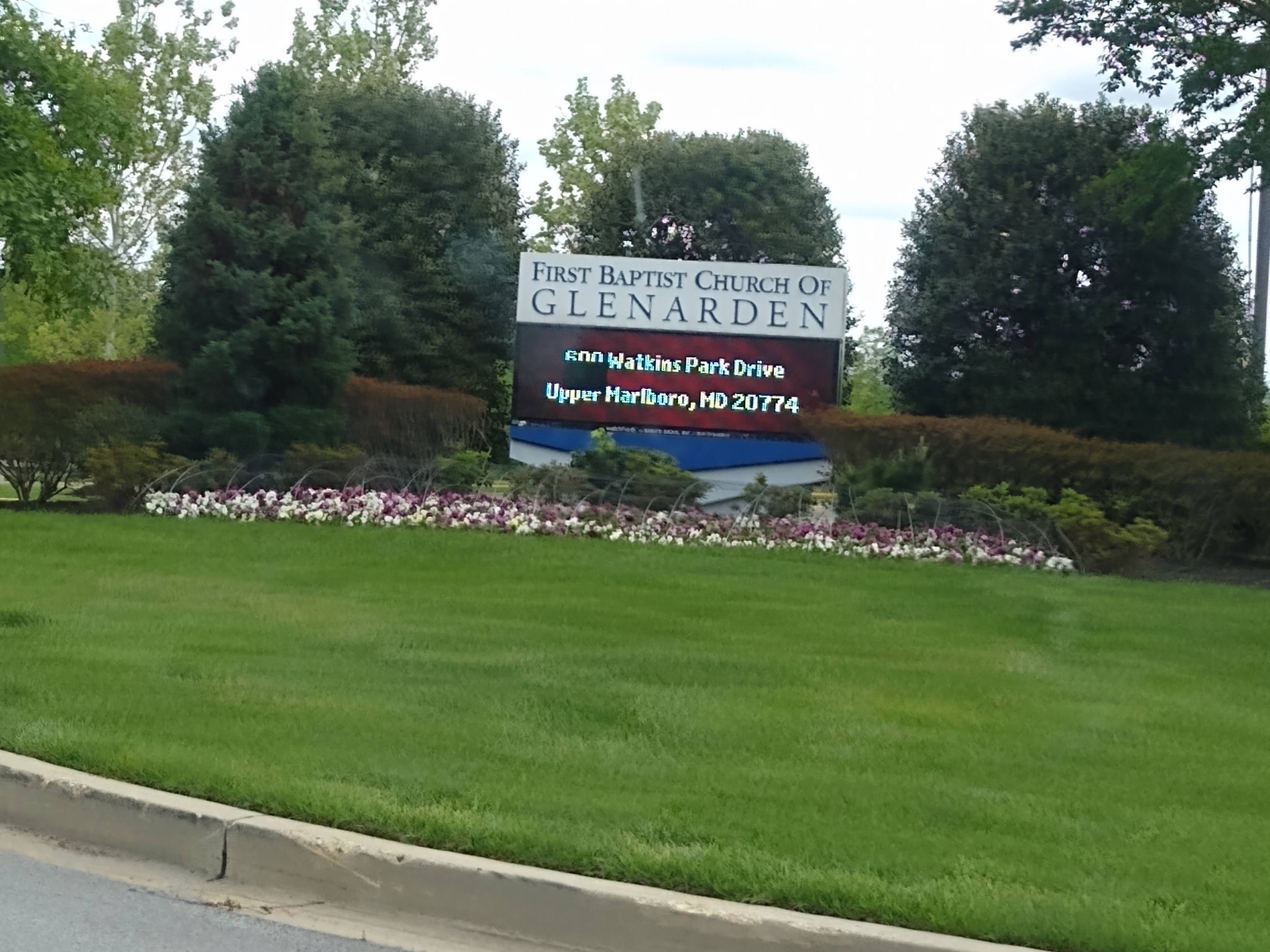
Electronic Signage at FBC Glenarden campus

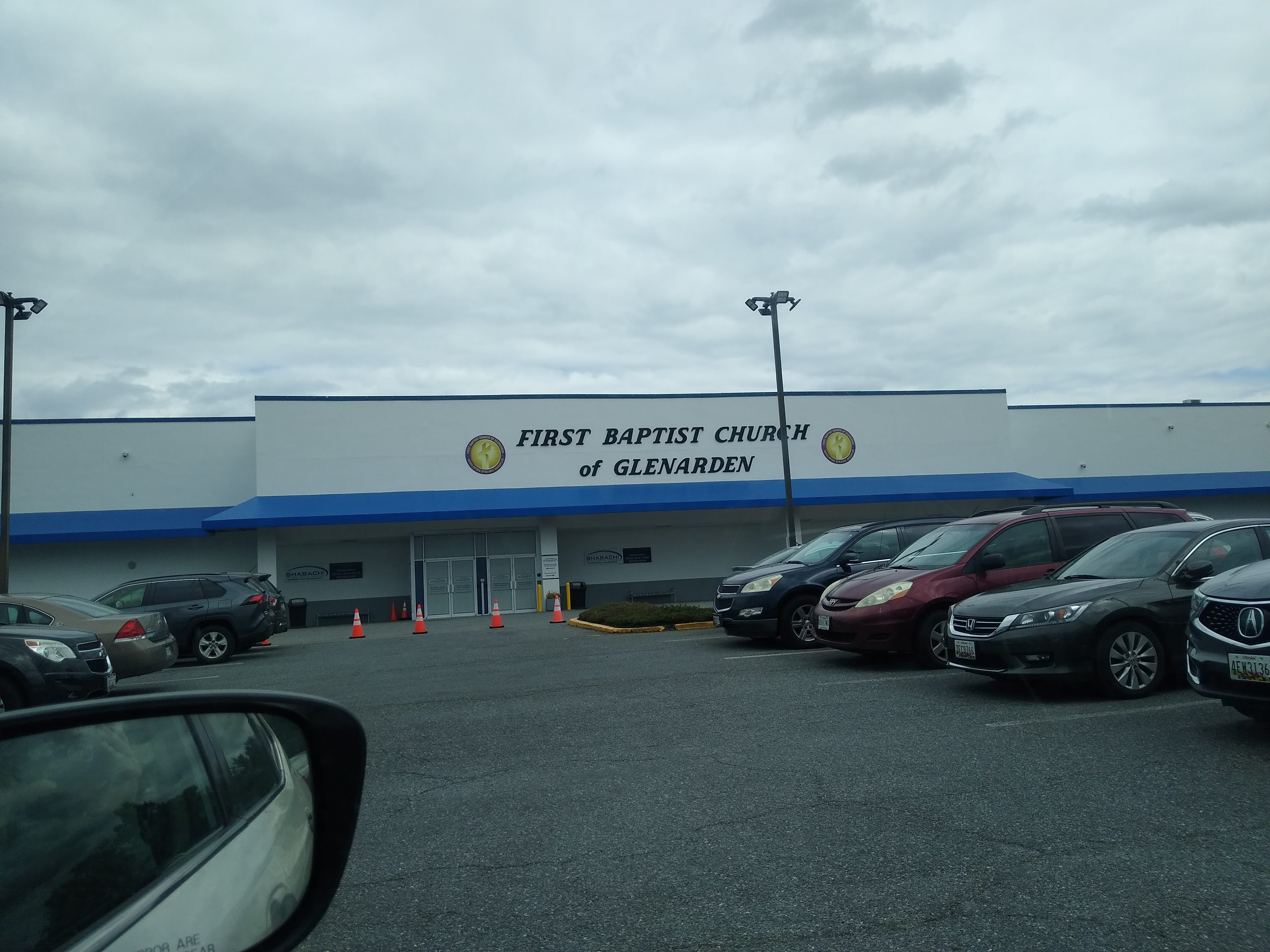
FBC Glenarden Ministry Center, located at a separate facility from main campus

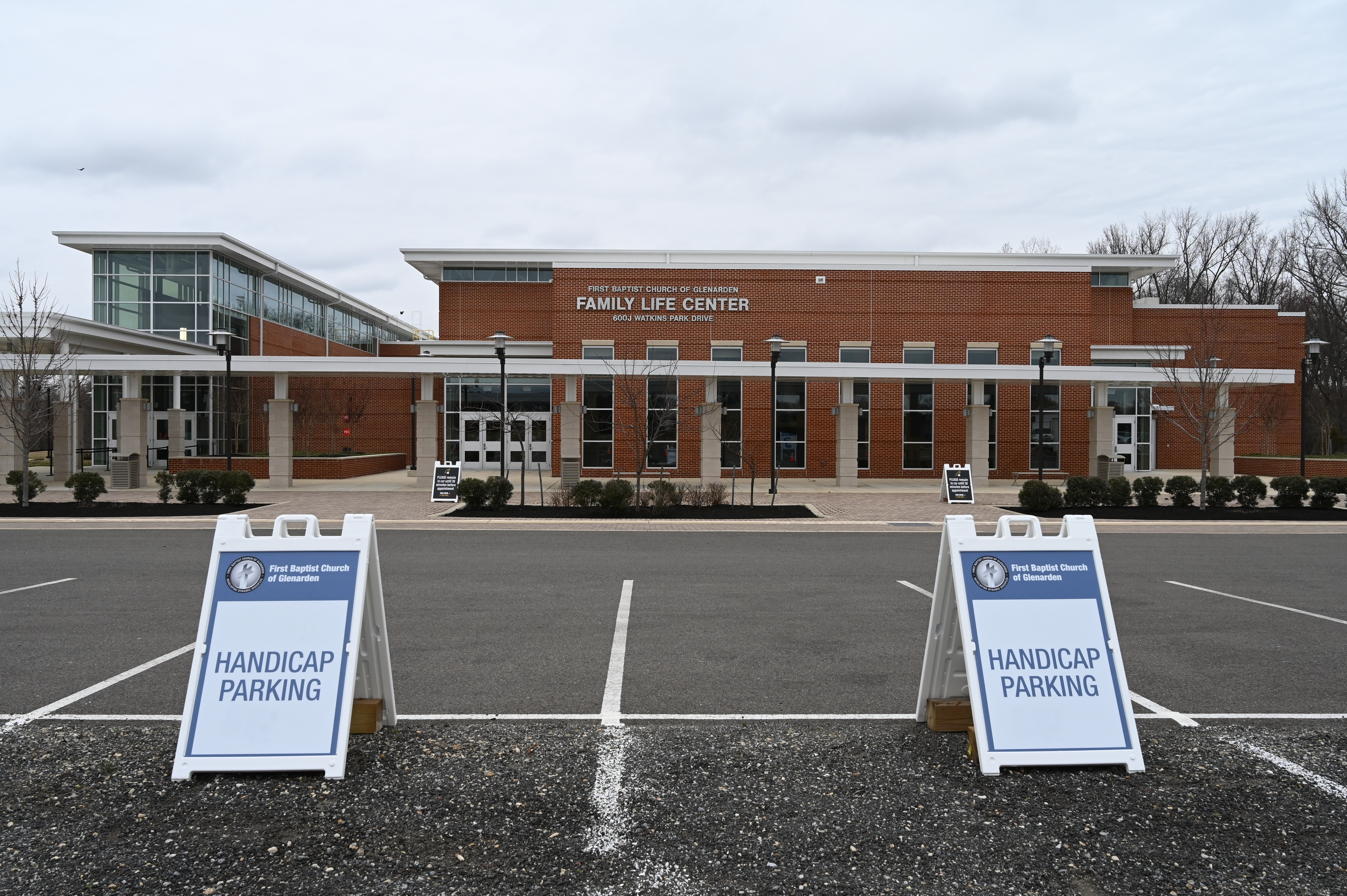
FBC Glenarden Community Life Center, with gymnasium and community center. Unattached to main building.

== See also ==
- List of the largest evangelical churches
- List of the largest evangelical church auditoriums
