= International Builders' Show =

Annual trade show in the United States

The International Builders' Show (IBS) is organized by the National Association of Home Builders (NAHB) and is the largest light construction building industry tradeshow in the United States. It is the only event of its kind, focusing specifically on the needs, concerns, and opportunities that face home builders. In 1944, the NAHB held its first annual convention and exposition, later becoming the International Builders' Show in 1998.

From its early start, the show has grown to attract more than 100,000 attendees, making it one of the largest conventions in the country. As such, the show has alternated its location since 2003 between the Orange County Convention Center in Orlando, Florida and the Las Vegas Convention Center in Las Vegas, Nevada (two of the United States' largest convention centers).

Since 2014, the International Builders' Show has been co-located with the Kitchen & Bath Industry Show (KBIS), with the combined shows branded as Design & Construction Week. In 2023, the National Hardware Show was co-dated with Design & Construction Week in Las Vegas. The 2023 Design and Construction Week drew nearly 110,000 attendees and nearly 2,000 exhibitors occupying more than one million square feet of indoor and outdoor exhibits.

== Previous and future dates ==
- 2000 - Jan. 14–17, Dallas, TX
- 2001 - Feb. 9–12, Atlanta, GA
- 2002 - Feb. 8–11, Atlanta, GA
- 2003 - Jan. 21–24, Las Vegas, NV
- 2004 - Jan. 19–22, Las Vegas, NV
- 2005 - Jan. 13–16, Orlando, FL
- 2006 - Jan. 11–14, Orlando, FL
- 2007 - Feb. 7–10, Orlando, FL
- 2008 - Feb. 12–15, Orlando, FL
- 2009 - Jan. 20–23, Las Vegas, NV
- 2010 - Jan. 19–22, Las Vegas, NV
- 2011 - Jan. 12–15, Orlando, FL
- 2012 - Feb. 8–11, Orlando, FL
- 2013 - Jan. 22–25, Las Vegas, NV
- 2014 - Feb. 4–7, Las Vegas, NV
- 2015 - Jan. 20–23, Las Vegas, NV
- 2016 - Jan. 19–22, Las Vegas, NV
- 2017 - Jan. 11–14, Orlando, FL
- 2018 - Jan. 10–13, Orlando, FL
- 2019 - Feb. 19–22, Las Vegas, NV
- 2020 - Jan. 21–24, Las Vegas, NV
- 2021 - Feb. 9–11, Orlando, FL
- 2022 - Feb. 8–10, Orlando, FL
- 2023 - Jan. 31 – Feb. 2, Las Vegas, NV
- 2024 - Feb. 27–29, Las Vegas, NV
- 2025 - Feb. 25–27, Las Vegas, NV
- 2026 - Feb. 17–19, Orlando, FL
