= National Association of Home Builders =

Trade organization in the United States

- Type: Trade Association
- Purpose: Representation of the housing industry
- Headquarters: Washington, D.C.
- Members: 140,000 members
- Chief Executive Officer: Jim Tobin
- Staff: 250+

The National Association of Home Builders (NAHB) is one of the largest trade associations in the United States, representing the interests of home builders, remodelers, developers, contractors, and associated businesses. NAHB is headquartered in Washington, D.C.

== Overview ==
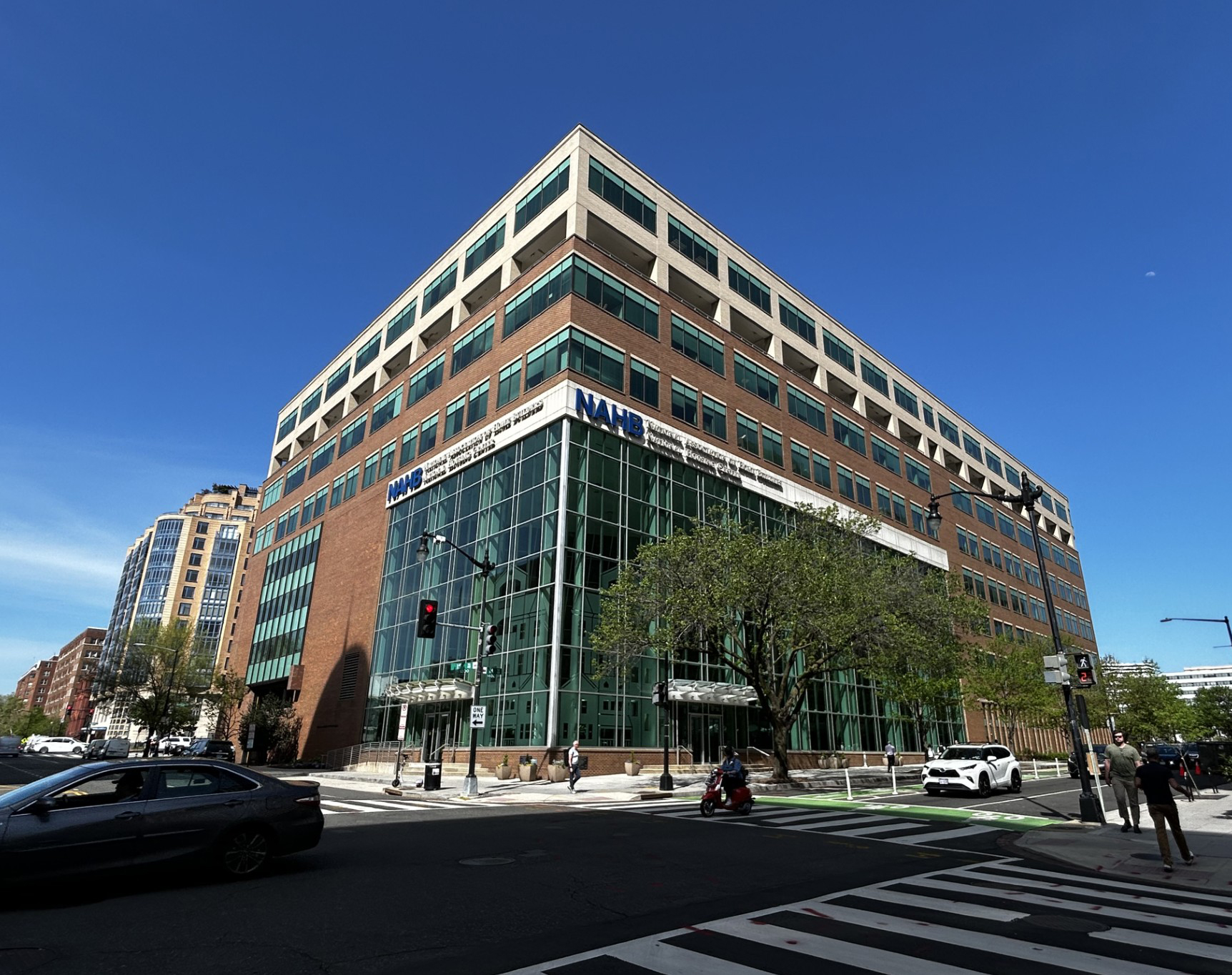
The National Housing Center, NAHB headquarters, in Washington, D.C.

Founded in 1942, NAHB is a federation of more than 700 state and local home builder associations (HBAs). About a third of the more than 140,000 NAHB members are home builders or remodelers. The rest of the membership works in closely related specialties such as sales and marketing, housing finance, and building materials manufacturing and supply.

Each year, NAHB members build approximately 80% of new homes constructed in the United States.

NAHB's various groups analyze policy issues, take the industry's story to the public through the media and other outlets, monitor and work toward improving the housing finance system, analyzing and forecasting economic and consumer trends, and educating, training, and disseminating information to members. NAHB represents the industry's interests on Capitol Hill. NAHB also works with federal agencies and state and local governments on regulations affecting the housing industry in mortgage finance, building codes, energy efficiency, and the environment.

NAHB organizes one of the largest trade shows in North America, the International Builders' Show (IBS). It is the largest conference of its kind for the residential and light commercial construction industry.

== Government affairs and lobbying ==
NAHB is consistently named one of the top lobbyists in Washington. NAHB also manages a political action committee, BUILD-PAC, that contributes to housing-friendly candidates for U.S. Congress. In addition, NAHB government affairs and program area staff is heavily involved at the state and local levels advocating for a favorable legal and regulatory environment that aligns with NAHB's top priorities: housing affordability, workforce development, material costs, housing finance reform, and building codes.

== Economic analysis ==
The NAHB Office of Economic and Housing Policy conducts independent research and produces a number of publications and indices, including the NAHB/Wells Fargo Housing Market Index (HMI), an economic indicator used by financial analysts, the Federal Reserve, policymakers, economic analysts, and the news media.
