= List of people from Potomac, Maryland =

Past and present residents of Potomac, Maryland include:

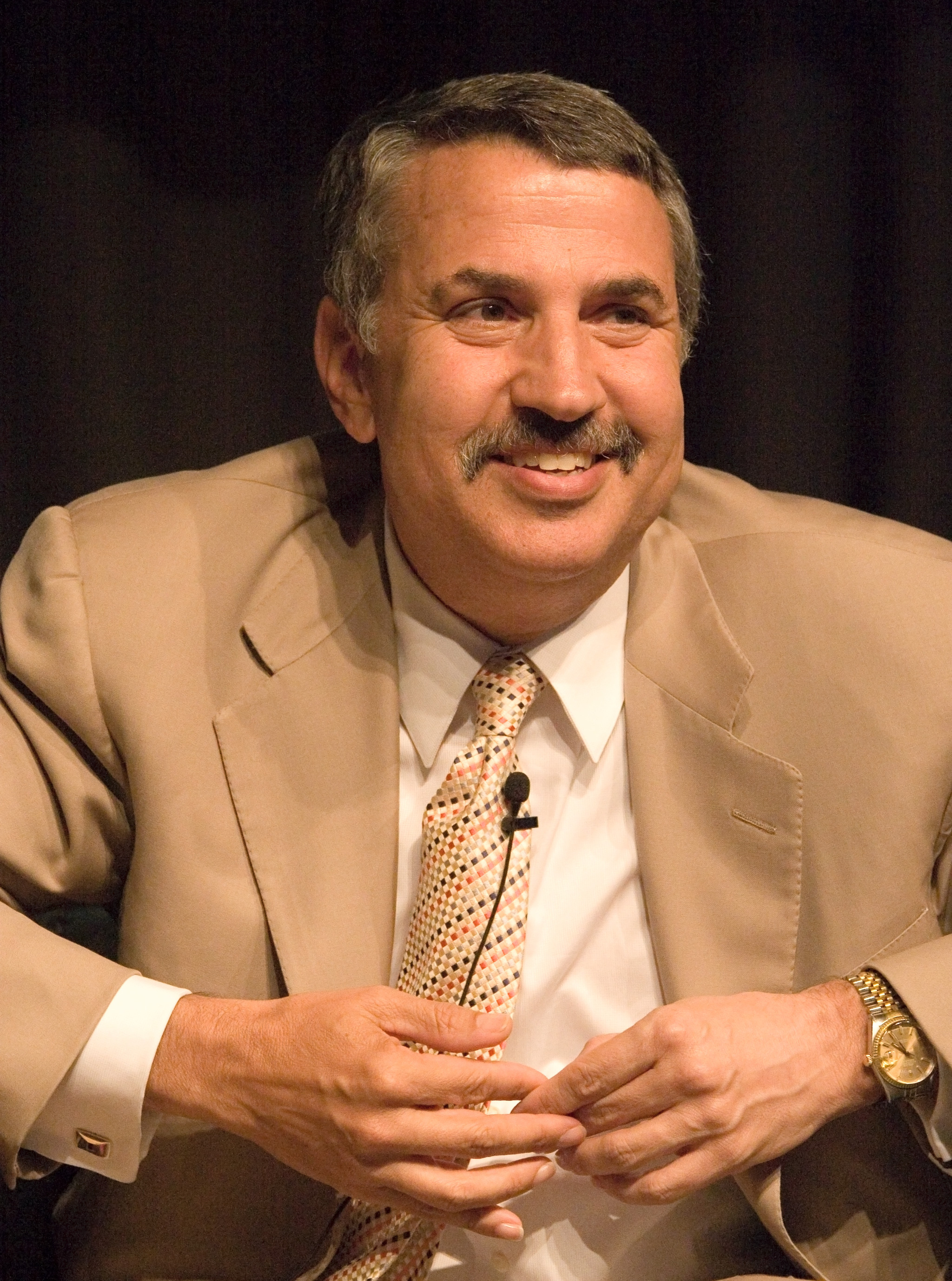
Thomas Friedman

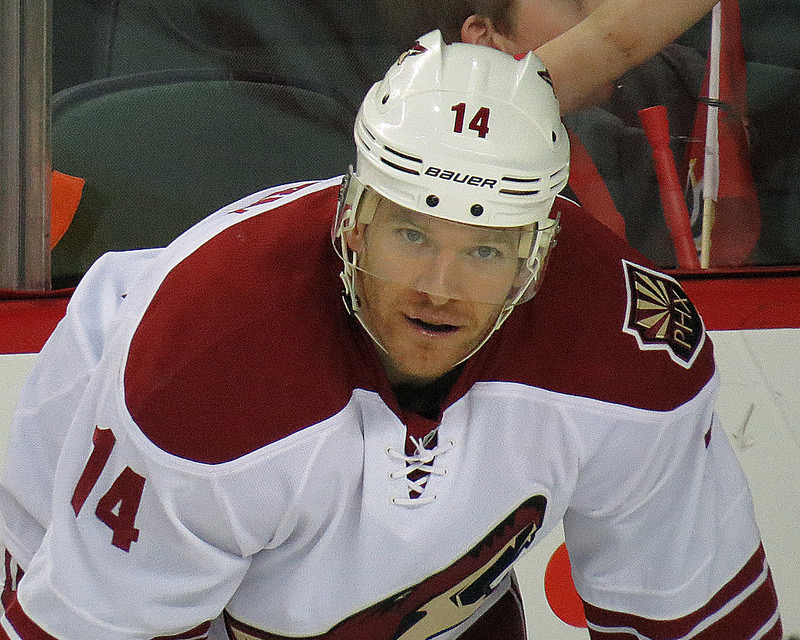
Jeff Halpern

- Atiku Abubakar, billionaire and vice president of Nigeria
- Freddy Adu, professional soccer player for Philadelphia Union
- Robert A. Altman, owner of ZeniMax Media; married to Lynda Carter
- Sam Anas, ice hockey player for Iowa Wild
- Surinder Arora, English hotelier
- Mike Barrowman, Olympic champion swimmer
- Howard Behrens, painter
- Eric F. Billings, CEO of FBR Capital Markets Corporation
- Wolf Blitzer, anchor and host of CNN's The Situation Room
- Noah Bratschi, professional speed climber, American record holder
- Eric Brodkowitz, Israeli-American baseball pitcher for the Israel national baseball team
- F. Lennox Campello, artist, art critic, writer and art dealer
- Lynda Carter, television actress, best known for her roles of Diana Prince and the title character on Wonder Woman
- Paul Castro, Hollywood screenwriter, best known for being the original writer/creator of the Warner Bros. hit drama, August Rush
- Calbert Cheaney, NBA player
- Michael Chertoff, former secretary of Homeland Security
- Kelen Coleman, actress
- Mike Cowan, professional caddy for Jim Furyk
- Kamie Crawford, Miss Maryland Teen USA 2010, Miss Teen USA 2010
- Donald Dell, sports attorney
- Sherman Douglas, basketball player
- Margaret Durante, country music artist signed to Emrose Records
- Jerome Dyson, basketball player, 2012–13 top scorer in the Israel Basketball Premier League
- Jen Easterly, director of the Cybersecurity and Infrastructure Security Agency
- Brooke Eby, business development manager and social media personality
- Patrick Ewing, NBA player and head coach of Georgetown University’s men's basketball team
- Kenneth Feld, owner and CEO of Feld Entertainment, producers of Ringling Bros. and Barnum & Bailey Circus
- Raul Fernandez, entrepreneur
- Thomas Friedman, author
- Phil Galfond, professional poker player
- John Glenn, senator and astronaut
- Jeff Halpern (born 1976), NHL player, the first in league history to be raised in the American South
- Beth Harbison, New York Times bestselling author
- Ayman Hariri, Lebanese billionaire and son of Rafic Hariri
- Leon Harris, anchor for WJLA-TV
- Dwayne Haskins, former football quarterback for the Washington Redskins and Pittsburgh Steelers
- John Hendricks, founder and former chairman of Discovery Communications
- Marillyn Hewson, chairman and CEO of Lockheed Martin
- Juwan Howard, former member of the Fab Five, NBA Center, and current Michigan Wolverines basketball head coach
- Karen Huger, Real Housewives of Potomac cast member
- Danny Hultzen, former pitcher for the Chicago Cubs
- E. Howard Hunt, author, CIA officer and Watergate figure
- King Hussein of Jordan
- Nneka Ihim, Real Housewives of Potomac cast member
- Frank Islam, philanthropist and founder of QSS Group
- Nurul Islam, Bangladeshi ex-minister, politician, and economist
- Antawn Jamison, NBA player
- Yahya Jammeh, president of Gambia
- Dhani Jones, NFL player
- Eddie Jordan, former NBA coach
- Joseph P. Kennedy, ambassador to the United Kingdom, resided at Marwood Manor
- Olaf Kolzig, ice hockey goaltender and coach
- Ted Koppel, former ABC News anchor
- Ryan Kuehl, NFL player
- Paul Laudicina, chairman and CEO of A.T. Kearney
- Sugar Ray Leonard, professional and Olympic champion boxer
- Ted Leonsis, owner of the NHL's Washington Capitals, NBA's Washington Wizards, and WNBA's Washington Mystics
- Ted Lerner, owner of Lerner Enterprises and MLB's Washington Nationals
- Bruce Levenson, owner of NBA's Atlanta Hawks
- Barry Levinson, Academy Award-winning director and screenwriter
- Liza Levy, Jewish community activist
- Chelsea Manning, convicted of violating the Espionage Act
- J. W. Marriott Jr., billionaire executive of Marriott International
- April McClain Delaney, U.S. congresswoman
- Mac McGarry, host of the Washington and Charlottesville, Virginia versions of It's Academic
- Nana Meriwether, Miss Maryland USA 2012, Miss USA 2012 (succeeded)
- Matt Mervis (born 1998), baseball player for the Chicago Cubs
- Abby Meyers (born 1999), basketball player for the Dallas Wings of the Women's National Basketball Association
- Serge Mombouli, ambassador of Congo 2000–2010
- Taylor Momsen, actress from CW TV series Gossip Girl
- Alonzo Mourning, NBA player
- Gheorghe Muresan, NBA player
- Dikembe Mutombo, NBA player
- Rachel Nichols, sports journalist, CNN anchor
- Queen Noor of Jordan, queen consort of Jordan, widow of Hussein of Jordan
- Teodoro Obiang Nguema Mbasogo, president of Equatorial Guinea
- Farah Pahlavi, former queen of Iran
- Reza Pahlavi, son of the last shah of Iran, and one of the leaders of the 2025-2026 Iranian protests and 2026 Iranian diaspora protests
- Benedict Peters, Nigerian billionaire and CEO of Aiteo
- Issa Rae, writer, actress, director, producer, author; co-creator of Insecure
- Mitchell Rales, chairman of the Danaher Corporation
- Rosa Rios, treasurer of the United States
- David Ritz, owner of Ritz Camera
- Franklin Delano Roosevelt, United States president, occupied Marwood Mansion during the summer
- Greg Rosenbaum, co-founder of The Carlyle Group
- Pete Sampras, tennis player (moved to California at age 7)
- Chris Samuels, former NFL offensive tackle, Washington Redskins
- Monique Samuels, Real Housewives of Potomac cast member; former spouse of Chris Samuels
- Eunice Kennedy Shriver, sister of John, Robert, and Ted Kennedy; mother of Maria Shriver
- Sargent Shriver, husband of Eunice Kennedy Shriver; founder of the Peace Corps; former ambassador to France
- Topper Shutt, chief meteorologist for WUSA-TV
- Donnie Simpson, WPGC 95.5 radio personality; former BET VJ
- Daniel Snyder, former owner of the NFL's Washington Redskins; former chairman of the board of Six Flags
- Gianmarco Soresi, stand-up comedian, actor, podcaster, and internet personality
- Sylvester Stallone, actor, screenwriter, and director
- Darren Star, television writer and producer
- Tim Sweeney, billionaire video game developer, founder of Epic Games
- David Trone, businessman and U.S. congressman
- Spike Trotman, founder of Iron Circus Comics
- Mike Tyson, professional boxer
- John Wall, NBA player for the Los Angeles Clippers
- Mark A. Weinberger, global chairman and CEO of EY
- Robert Wexler, U.S. congressman
- Buck Williams, NBA player
- Christopher Williams, NASA astronaut and medical physicist
- Gary Williams, former head coach of University of Maryland's basketball team
- Willie J. Williams, NFL player
