= David Trone =

American businessman and politician (born 1955)

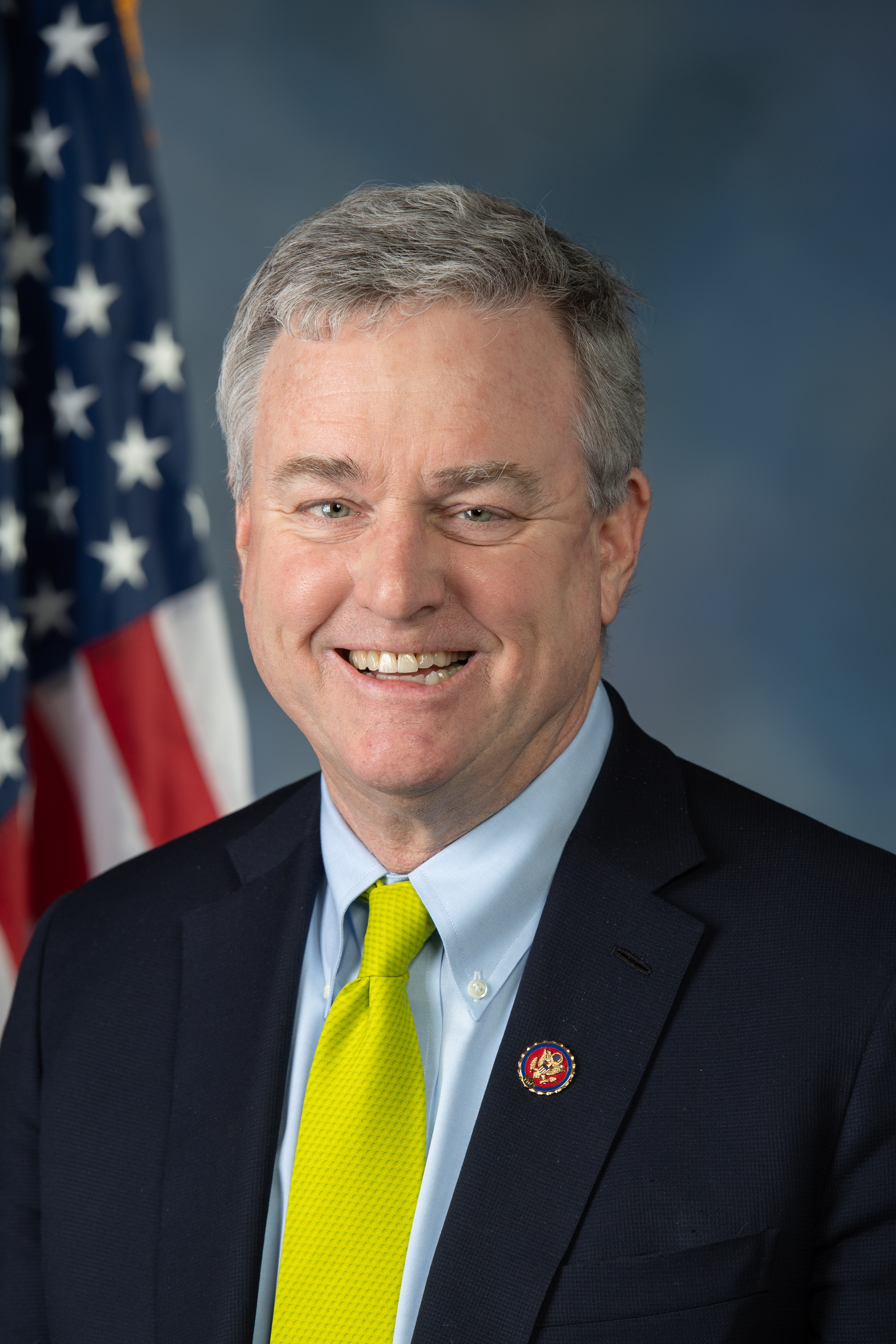
- Official portrait, 2019

Member of the U.S. House of Representatives from Maryland's 6th district
- In office January 3, 2019 – January 3, 2025
- Preceded by: John Delaney
- Succeeded by: April McClain Delaney

Personal details
- Born: David John Trone; September 21, 1955 (age 71) Cheverly, Maryland, U.S.
- Party: Democratic
- Spouse: June Trone (m. 1987)
- Children: 4
- Education: Furman University (BA); University of Pennsylvania (MBA)
- Trone's voice Trone supporting the Public Safety Officer Support Act. Recorded May 18, 2022

David John Trone (born September 21, 1955) is an American politician and businessman who served as the U.S. representative for Maryland's 6th congressional district from 2019 to 2025. The district includes most of the western third of the state, but the bulk of its population is in the outer northern suburbs of Washington, D.C. Trone founded and co-owns Total Wine & More with his brother, Robert L. Trone, and served as the company's president until December 2016.

In 2016, Trone spent more than $13 million of his own money on his unsuccessful Democratic primary campaign to succeed Chris Van Hollen in Maryland's 8th congressional district, setting a record for the most expensive self-funded House campaign. In 2018, Trone was the Democratic nominee for the 6th district and won the general election to succeed John Delaney. Trone made mental health issues and fighting addiction a top priority during his tenure in Congress, where he co-chaired the Bipartisan Addiction and Mental Health Task Force.

Trone announced his candidacy for the United States Senate in the 2024 election to succeed Ben Cardin. Trone spent over $60 million of his own money to support his campaign. On May 14, 2024, he was defeated in the Democratic primary by Prince George's County executive Angela Alsobrooks. In 2026, Trone again ran for Congress in Maryland's 6th congressional district, but was defeated in the Democratic primary by his successor, April McClain Delaney.

== Early life and education ==
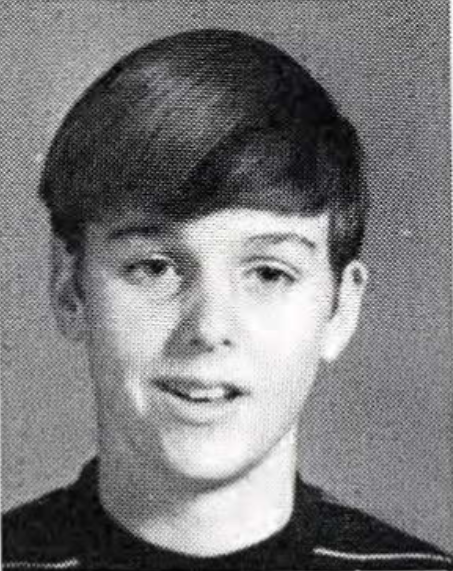
Trone in the Bermudian Springs High School 1971 yearbook

Trone was born in Maryland and raised on a 200-acre (81 ha) farm in East Berlin, Pennsylvania, where his father Thomas ran a chicken and hog operation. Thomas also owned a soda and beer store. When Trone's parents separated, his father kept the farm and his mother took over the store. Thomas and his farm went into bankruptcy, but Trone kept working at his mother's store.

Trone graduated magna cum laude, Phi Beta Kappa, from Furman University in 1977, and earned a Master of Business Administration in 1985 from the Wharton School of the University of Pennsylvania.

== Career ==
=== Total Wine & More ===
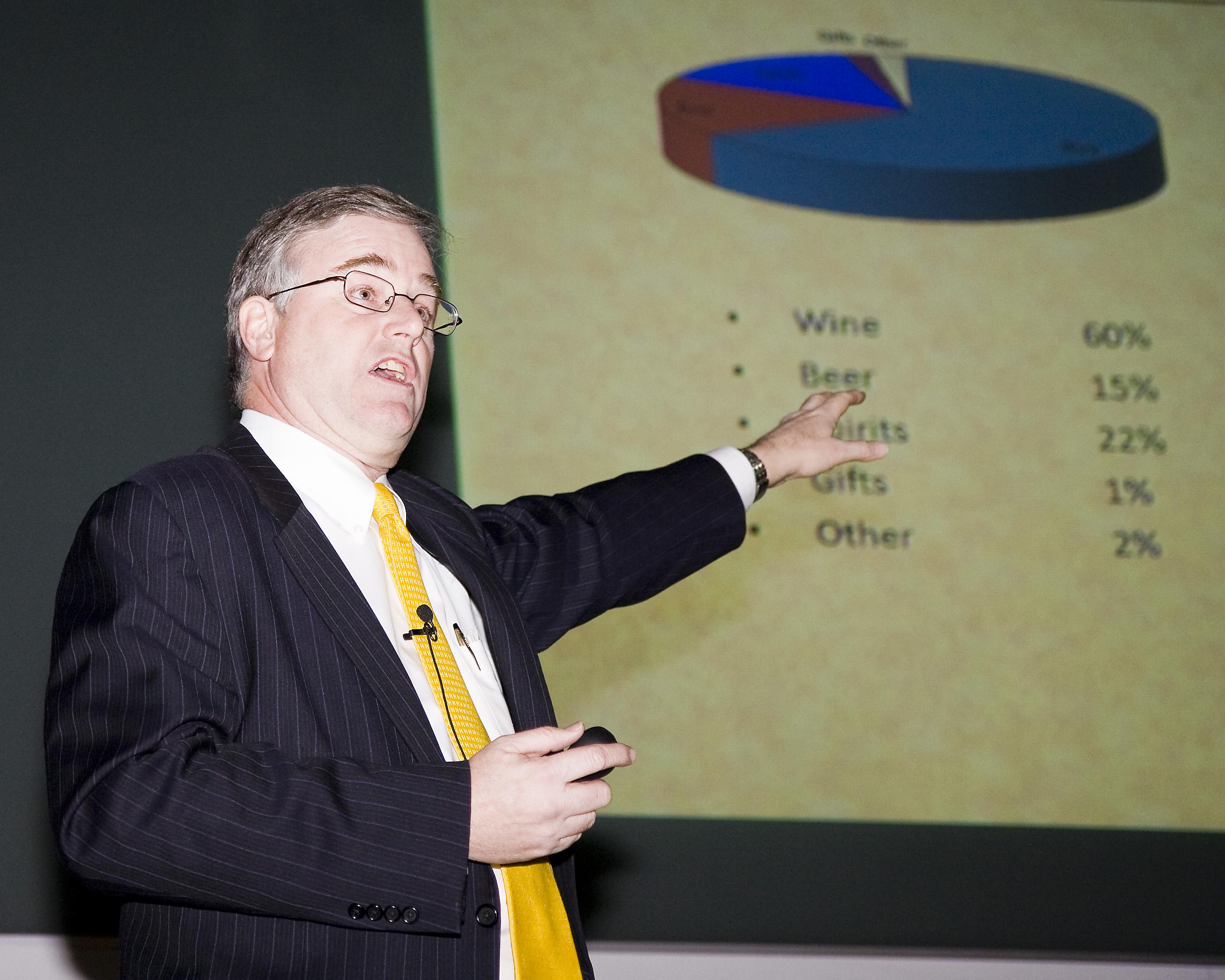
Trone speaks at a Total Wine & More company meeting, 2009

Having seen the potential of the beer sales at his mother's store, Trone began his career by founding the beer-only retailer Beer World in Pennsylvania in 1984, during his second semester of graduate school. Months before graduating from Wharton, in 1985, Trone expanded into the Pittsburgh metropolitan area. Over time, he opened additional stores, called Beer and Pop Warehouse and, later, Beer World, which were owned by friends and family members because Pennsylvania state law prohibited individuals from owning more than one beer retail outlet.

Trone, with his brother Robert's help, opened two stores in Delaware in 1991, adding wine and spirits to the company's offerings. Using knowledge acquired at Wharton, the brothers chose to replicate the family store's model across Pennsylvania. The beverage company had slim margins, but was immediately profitable and allowed the brothers to focus on operations. They familiarized themselves with regulators and industry leaders, and began changing laws that restrict wholesalers from offering retailers discounts in exchange for large volume purchases, among others, in their attempt to promote beverage consumption.

The business has since expanded into what is known today as Total Wine & More, the largest privately owned beer, wine, and spirits retailer in the U.S. In December 2016, Trone gave up his title of president to chief executive Kevin Peters. He has continued to make money from Total Wine & More while in Congress, reporting more than $110 million in personal income during his tenure.

==== Lobbying efforts ====
Under Trone's tenure, Total Wine lobbied against state laws that prevented the company from selling below cost, including in Connecticut and Massachusetts, where the company temporarily had its license suspended for refusing to comply with such laws. According to lobbying records analyzed by The Baltimore Sun, Trone spent over $1.4 million lobbying state governments to overturn or weaken what the company said were "anti-consumer laws passed after Prohibition". The company saw success with these efforts in various states, including Minnesota, Texas, and the Carolinas. Trone also gave more than $240,000 in campaign contributions to various politicians, most of which went toward Republican candidates including Texas governor Greg Abbott and lieutenant governor Dan Patrick, and North Carolina governor Pat McCrory.

During the 2016 legislative session in Maryland, Trone supported an unsuccessful bill that would have allowed Total Wine & More to double the number of stores it has in the state. During the 2024 legislative session, Trone and his brother supported a bill that would allow Total Wine & More to increase the number of stores it has in the state from two to eight.

Total Wine & More brought these efforts before the U.S. Supreme Court in 2019, who ruled for Total Wine & More in Tennessee Wine and Spirits Retailers Assn. v. Thomas, overturning the state's residency requirement for obtaining a license to operate a liquor store and thereby allowing the company to expand into Tennessee. In July 2023, The American Prospect reported that Total Wine & More sought to impede on a Federal Trade Commission investigation into alleged violations of the Robinson–Patman Act, which prohibits anti-competitive price discrimination, in alcohol markets.

During the 2020 and 2022 election cycles, Retail Services and Systems, a company through which Trone formerly made campaign contributions, made $85,500 in campaign contributions toward Republican candidates. A Trone campaign spokesperson told Time that Trone had not been personally involved in contributions made by Retail Services and Systems since stepping down as Total Wine's CEO in 2015, and pointed toward his combined $8.5 million in donations to the Democratic Party and pro-choice Democratic candidates. Trone later told Jewish Insider that the contributions were necessary to "protect [the company] from attack".

During the 2022 general elections in Massachusetts and Colorado, the Trone brothers spent almost $3 million on media against Massachusetts Question 3, which would lower the number of alcohol beverage licenses retailers could have in the state, and an additional $2 million financing a campaign to support Colorado Proposition 124, which would have allowed Total Wine & More to open an unlimited number of Colorado stores by 2037. Both ballot initiatives were defeated by voters.

==== Legal disputes ====
Beginning in 1989 and over the next three years, Pennsylvania authorities arrested Trone three times following complaints from an association of smaller, individually owned stores. One arrest was for negotiating volume discounts on behalf of multiple stores and illegally advertising beer prices, and one was for circumventing state transportation regulations. The charges were dismissed.

In 1992, a grand jury in Dauphin County, Pennsylvania, indicted Trone, his wife, June, and his brother for owning multiple stores through Trone's consulting company, among other charges, all of which were later dropped and expunged. In 1994, a state judge dismissed 19 of the 23 counts based on "prosecutorial overreaching", and the remaining counts were withdrawn after Trone paid a $40,000 fee to cover investigation costs.

During these legal proceedings, the Bureau of Alcohol, Tobacco, Firearms and Explosives (ATF) broke the law by providing records of his consulting firm to government officials, prompting Trone to sue the agency in federal court. He won and was awarded $400,000. The lawyer who had represented Trone also served as a national board member of the American Civil Liberties Union (ACLU), which began a long-term relationship between Trone and the ACLU. The Trones' difficulties in Pennsylvania prompted them to leave the state; Total Wine & More grew from the remaining two stores in Delaware and an additional retail outlet in New Jersey, which Trone had opened in the early 1990s.

=== Philanthropy ===
In addition to political contributions, Trone and his wife have supported a number of philanthropic efforts. They have been major contributors to the ACLU since 1994. Their $15 million donation in 2015 supported the ACLU's efforts to promote criminal justice reform and improve employment opportunities for former prisoners, and established the Trone Center for Justice and Equality at the ACLU's national headquarters. In 2016, the couple pledged $5 million to establish the Trone Family Public Policy Initiative Fund at their alma mater, the Wharton School of the University of Pennsylvania.

In mid-2017, the Trones donated $2.5 million to Bethesda, Maryland's Suburban Hospital to support mental and behavioral health services and make improvements to the Old Georgetown Road campus. Their donation was inspired by their nephew's death from an opioid overdose in late 2016. The David and June Trone Family Foundation contributed $100,000 to the Catholic Legal Immigration Network in 2017 to support locals affected by Trump's travel ban, which the couple called "outrageously egregious". The Trones also donated to the ACLU's Montgomery County affiliate, the Latino immigrant organization CASA, and Interfaith Works.

Trone's contributions to Furman University include a $5 million grant for a student center and to create men's and women's lacrosse teams, and the lead $500,000 gift for the Riley Foundation's endowment to support disadvantaged South Carolina students. The Trone Student Center was dedicated in 2013 and named for Trone and his wife, in honor of their $3.5 million contribution.

In 2021, Trone and his wife donated $5 million to American University to help support research on addiction and behavioral health. They also donated $10 million in 2022 to his alma mater, Furman University, targeting mental health. Officials at Furman University said $8.5 million of the donation would be dedicated to renovating Furman's counseling center, creating the Trone Family Fund for Student Mental Health and Well-Being, and expanding the school's mental health services. Trone also donated $1.5 million to create the Hillel Endowment Fund to support Furman's Hillel, the Jewish Student Association. In 2024, Trone said that his $10 million donation to Furman's mental health facilities was made to support his transgender niece, who was transitioning while attending the university.

== U.S. House of Representatives ==
=== Elections ===
==== 2016 ====
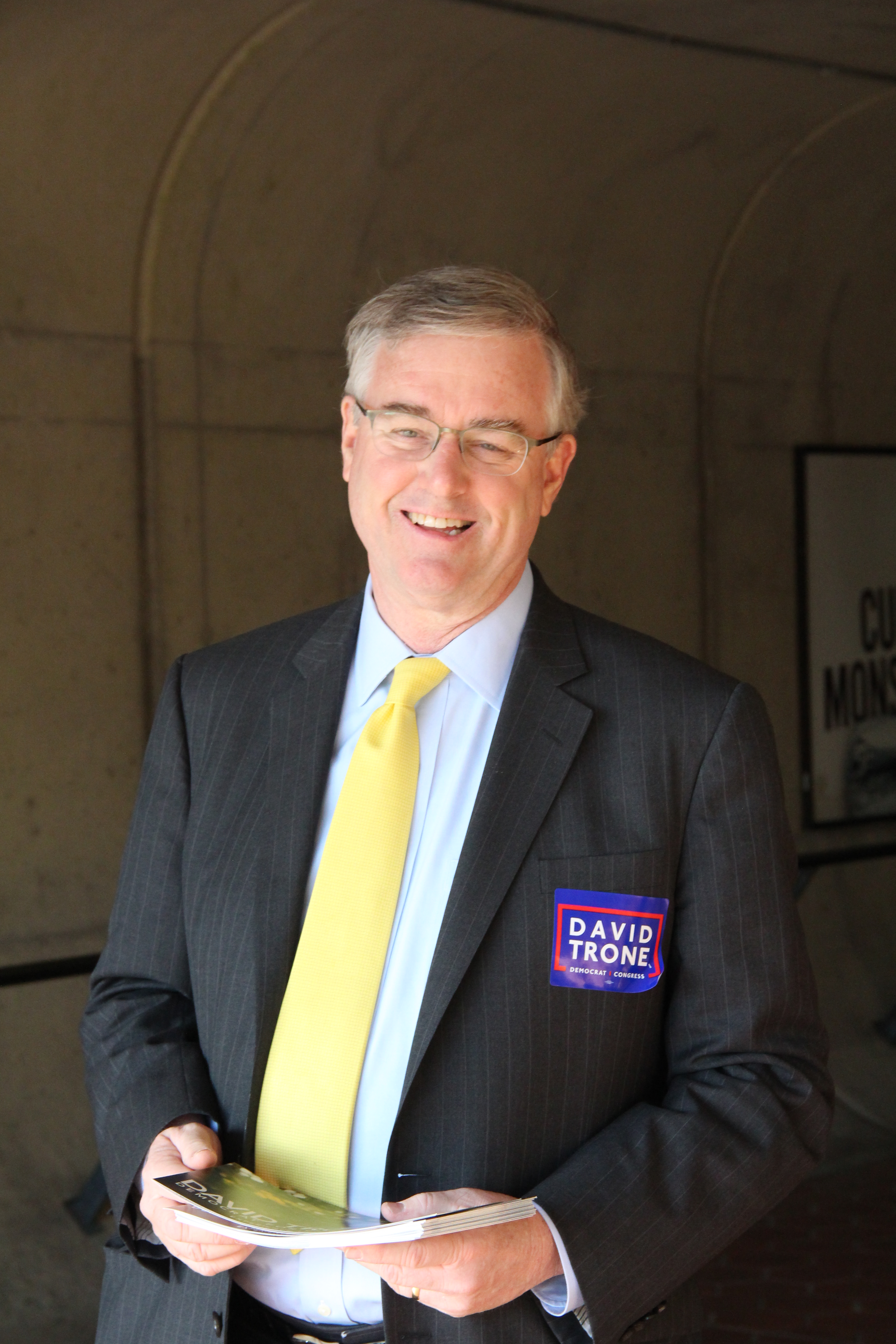
Trone campaigning in 2016

Trone has been active in Democratic politics and hosted fundraisers for the party. In 2014, he hosted a fundraiser for gubernatorial candidate Anthony Brown that former president Bill Clinton attended, and in November 2015, he held a fundraiser at his home for the Democratic National Committee, which President Obama attended. Trone also contributed to Republican politicians; according to OpenSecrets, he donated more than $150,000 to Republicans in multiple U.S. states between 2000 and 2015. The Washington Post reported that Trone contributed more than $90,000 to Democratic state officials during the same period, and said the donations made to Republicans were to support "legislation or regulatory changes favorable to his company". Trone said the donations "represented the cost of doing business, especially in states with Republican-controlled state houses and governor's mansions".

In January 2016, Trone entered the Democratic primary campaign to succeed Chris Van Hollen in Maryland's 8th congressional district; this was the real contest in the heavily Democratic district. He ran on reducing unemployment and gun violence, criminal justice reform, environmental protection, and education and foreign policy. Trone pledged to support early education, work with the National Institutes of Health to reduce health care costs, improve infrastructure, and forgive more student loans for government employees.

Trone spent more than $13 million on his unsuccessful campaign, which became the most expensive self-funded House campaign ever. The first-time candidate said a large personal investment was necessary in order to stand out in a crowded race that included well-known rivals, including news anchor and Marriott International executive Kathleen Matthews and the winner, state senator Jamie Raskin. After the election, Trone told NPR, "We knew it would be very expensive. We're not surprised by what it cost at all. We anticipated that, and it was a thoughtful choice my wife and I made... It was the right decision to take no money from anybody."

==== 2018 ====
On August 2, 2017, Trone announced his candidacy for the Democratic nomination for Maryland's 6th district, an open seat being vacated by John Delaney, who chose not to seek reelection and retire from Congress to focus on his 2020 presidential campaign. Trone had endorsed Delaney for president several days earlier. He told Washington Jewish Week in early 2018 that lessons learned from his previous run included entering the race earlier and raising money.

Trone toured Maryland in late 2017, and filed his candidacy in January 2018. His filing was accompanied by a press release expressing his support for education, environmental protections, health care, Social Security, and women's rights. Trone also made combating the opioid epidemic a central focus of his platform, releasing an action plan and hosting a series of town hall meetings to address the crisis. In March 2018, Trone, gubernatorial candidate Rushern Baker, and John Delaney organized free bus trips from Maryland to Washington, D.C., in support of the March for Our Lives demonstration.

Trone was endorsed by Baker, Joanne C. Benson, Anthony Brown, and Doug Duncan.

On June 26, 2018, Trone won the Democratic primary election for Maryland's 6th district against seven challengers with 40% of the vote.

In the general election, Trone faced Republican Amie Hoeber and candidates from other parties. He was endorsed by the Washington Post. On November 6, 2018, Trone was elected with 57.5% of the vote.

==== 2020 ====
On January 23, 2020, Trone announced his intention to run for reelection to Congress.

In the general election, Trone defeated Republican nominee Neil Parrott and candidates from other parties with 58.8% of the vote.

==== 2022 ====
Trone again defeated Republican Neil Parrott in a rematch with 54.8% of the vote.

=== Tenure ===
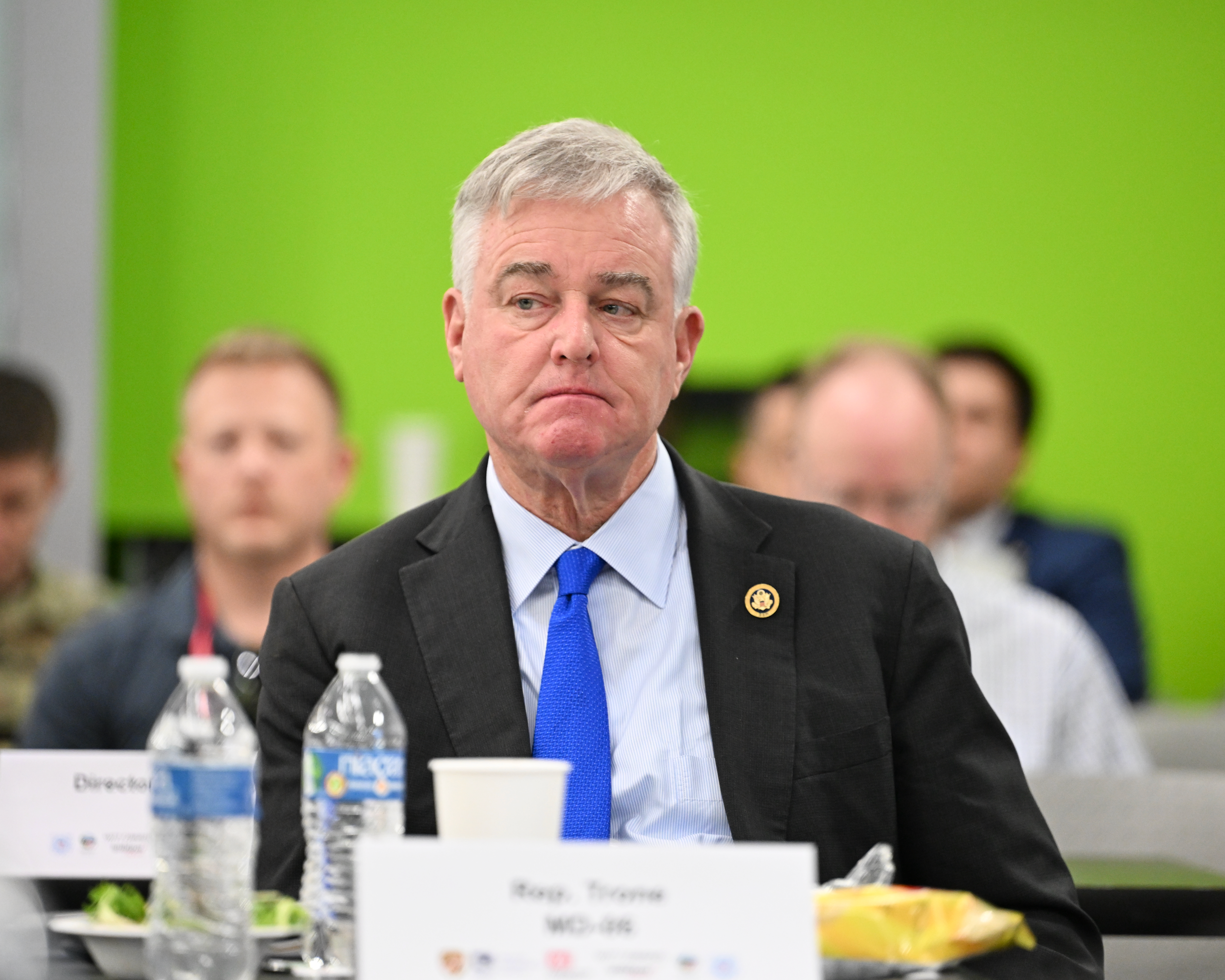
Trone attends a House Appropriations Committee hearing on the Francis Scott Key Bridge collapse, May 2024

Trone was rated the 15th most bipartisan member of Congress by the Common Ground Committee and The Lugar Center rated Trone as the 23rd most bipartisan member of the U.S. House. He voted with President Joe Biden's stated position 100% of the time in the 117th Congress, according to a FiveThirtyEight analysis. In January 2023, Trone had surgery and was absent for the 12th round of voting for speaker of the House; he returned while still wearing hospital clothes and voted in the 13th round.

=== Committee assignments ===
For the 118th Congress:

- Committee on Appropriations
  - Subcommittee on Commerce, Justice, Science, and Related Agencies
  - Subcommittee on Homeland Security
- Committee on the Budget
- Joint Economic Committee

=== Caucus memberships ===
- Congressional Asian Pacific American Caucus
- New Democrat Coalition
- Bipartisan Addiction and Mental Health Task Force
- Black Maternal Health Caucus
- Congressional Equality Caucus
- House Pro-Choice Caucus
- Problem Solvers Caucus
- Congressional Caucus for the Equal Rights Amendment
- Congressional Ukraine Caucus
- Rare Disease Caucus

== 2024 U.S. Senate campaign ==
Trone's 2024 U.S. Senate campaign logo

On May 4, 2023, Trone announced his candidacy for the U.S. Senate in the 2024 election to succeed Ben Cardin.

Before announcing his candidacy, Trone reportedly told those close to him that he would spend up to $50 million of his own money on the race. Trone had loaned his campaign $62.5 million and outspent his closest competitor, Angela Alsobrooks, by 10-to-1. Trone's campaign utilized his self-funding ability to run a heavy advertising blitz to build up momentum behind his campaign and increase his name recognition and approval ratings in polling, which overwhelmed the Alsobrooks campaign and its resources, and made the election the most expensive statewide race in Maryland history. His campaign has set a record as the most expensive self-funded Senate primary campaign and the second most expensive self-funded Senate campaign overall, behind only Rick Scott's $63 million self-funded U.S. Senate campaign in 2018.

During the campaign, Trone presented himself as a progressive Democrat, citing his philanthropic activities and hiring practices at Total Wine & More, and highlighted a platform focused on drug costs, systemic racism, and defending abortion rights. He also received over 100 endorsements, largely from many of his House colleagues and from elected officials within his district. Trone has donated to the campaigns of several of his endorsers, including $350,000 toward Anthony Brown's 2022 attorney general campaign, around $300,000 to 31 of the 67 U.S. representatives backing his campaign, and smaller donations to local politicians.

David Trone's performance by county in the 2024 Democratic primary for U.S. Senator from Maryland. Legend: 20-30%; 30-40%; 40-50%; 50-60%; 60-70%; 70-80%; 80-90%

Throughout the Democratic primary, polls showed Trone with a narrow lead over Alsobrooks as a result of name recognition from his nonstop media blitz. However, Trone's candidacy suffered from various political gaffes he had made along the campaign trail in the final weeks of the election, including his accidental use of a racial slur during a congressional hearing. This, combined with the Alsobrooks campaign starting to run its advertisements touting her endorsements and achievements while in office, allowed the Alsobrooks campaign to close the gap between her and Trone and ultimately defeat Trone in the Democratic primary election on May 14, 2024. Trone conceded defeat that night and endorsed Alsobrooks in the general election.

Ahead of the general election, Trone suggested that he could have spent upwards of $50 million of his own personal wealth on the race if he had won the Democratic nomination, though he had previously suggested that he may have required some assistance from the Democratic Senatorial Campaign Committee. Trone pledged to only serve two terms in the Senate if elected.

== Post-congressional career ==
In December 2024, Trone told Maryland Matters that he would not return to Total Wine & More after leaving Congress, instead opting to work more on his charitable foundation in support of people struggling with addiction or mental health issues. He also continued to stay involved in Maryland politics, throwing his financial support behind state's attorney Aisha Braveboy in the 2025 Prince George's County executive special election to fill the remainder of Angela Alsobrooks's term as county executive.

In October 2025, Trone and Florida Governor Ron DeSantis were named co-chairs for U.S. Term Limits's campaign for congressional term limits.

== 2026 U.S. House of Representatives campaign ==
In December 2025, Trone announced that he would run in 2026 to represent Maryland's 6th congressional district, challenging Democratic incumbent April McClain Delaney. During the Democratic primary, he loaned his campaign $25 million and criticized McClain Delaney's public record on several issues, including immigration, transgender rights, and abortion. Trone was defeated by McClain Delaney in the Democratic primary election on June 23, 2026, placing second with 37.0 percent of the vote.

== Political positions ==
=== Abortion ===
Trone has a 100% pro-choice voting record in Congress, according to Planned Parenthood Action and NARAL. Both organizations have endorsed him in all of his general election efforts. In July 2022, he criticized the U.S. Supreme Court's ruling in Dobbs v. Jackson Women's Health Organization, calling the demise of Roe v. Wade "devastating" and saying that the decision would "impact the lives of millions of women across this country". Trone later voted for measures to codify Roe v. Wade and to protect patients traveling to receive abortion services and provided funding toward an abortion clinic in Cumberland, Maryland. At the opening of the clinic, located in an "abortion desert," Trone stated that "abortion rights are human rights" in a speech celebrating its opening. During his 2024 U.S. Senate campaign, he said that he would be a "reliable vote for abortions rights" in the Senate.

=== Criminal justice reform ===
Trone opposes the death penalty. Trone co-sponsored the George Floyd Justice in Policing Act, a police reform bill aimed at preventing brutality and racial discrimination in policing, in 2020. In the same month, he also introduced the Workforce Justice Act, which would remove the requirement to inform employers of a job applicant's criminal history. In 2023, Trone founded the Second Chance Task Force in an effort to promote policies that improve reentry outcomes and reduce employment barriers for returning citizens, a disproportionate number of whom are people of color. The task force includes an equal number of Democrats and Republicans.

=== Cryptocurrency ===
In October 2023, Trone signed onto a letter written by Senator Elizabeth Warren calling on the Biden administration to crack down on the use of cryptocurrency in terrorist financing. During his 2024 U.S. Senate campaign, Trone noted the need for the United States to establish a reasonable regulatory framework for digital currencies so the country can maintain its leading position with technological innovation, highlighting the progress already made by other countries.

=== Education ===
During his 2016 campaign, Trone proposed a plan to make college free in return for five years of public service in government. He also supports making vocational schools more affordable, but opposes tuition freezes, calling them "nothing more than a marketing tool". In January 2020, he voted for a resolution to overturn revisions made by U.S. education secretary Betsy DeVos to the Borrower Defense Program. In May 2020, Trone signed a letter to DeVos criticizing her decision not to extend emergency federal aid grants provided by the CARES Act to undocumented students. During his 2024 U.S. Senate campaign, he supported providing students with free community college and starting preschool education in classroom settings for three year olds.

=== Electoral reform ===
During his campaigns, Trone refused to accept campaign contributions from corporations, lobbyists, or special interests. He supports bipartisan redistricting reform, including the creation of an independent redistricting commission, and has blamed Republican strategist Karl Rove for "inventing gerrymandering".

Trone called on the Maryland State Board of Elections to make their electronic voting machines more accessible for disabled voters in March 2016, saying that the machines were not programmed to show all candidates on a single screen.

In November 2018, the day following his election win, the United States Court of Appeals for the Fourth Circuit in Benisek v. Lamone struck down Maryland's redistricting plan as unconstitutionally gerrymandered. Trone later defended Maryland's congressional map during an appeal of the ruling to the U.S. Supreme Court, submitting an amicus brief to the court in February 2019. In March 2019, Trone criticized Governor Larry Hogan's proposed redraw of Maryland's congressional maps—which saw Maryland's sixth congressional district redrawn to include Frederick and Carroll counties, thereby making it more favorable to Republicans—calling his proposal "not germane". After Maryland's congressional maps were redrawn following a court ruling in March 2022 that struck down the state's previous maps, Trone praised the court ruling as "moving the state away from partisan gerrymandering" and again called for national redistricting reform.

During his 2024 U.S. Senate campaign, Trone indicated that he would support extending voting rights to undocumented immigrants and 16-year-olds. He also expressed support for imposing a term limit of two six-year terms on U.S. senators, three two-year terms on U.S. Representatives, and 18-year terms for federal judges and U.S. Supreme Court justices. He also expressed support for banning congressmembers from trading stocks and from becoming lobbyists after their tenure, and for expanding the Supreme Court by allowing each president to appoint two members to the Supreme Court.

=== Filibuster ===
In an interview with Meet the Press in May 2023, Trone said he would support eliminating the filibuster in the United States Senate, but stressed the need to work with Republicans.

=== Foreign policy ===
In March 2016, Trone said he supported the proposed Trans-Pacific Partnership trade agreement and blamed Republican lobbyists for preventing it from passing. In 2020, he voted for the United States–Mexico–Canada Agreement, a successor to NAFTA. During his 2024 U.S. Senate campaign, Trone supported expanding domestic manufacturing to lessen the United States' dependency on exports from other countries.

==== China ====
Trone is the co-chair of the Commission on Combating Synthetic Opioid Trafficking, a government commission created to develop solutions to the opioid epidemic. In February 2022, Trone blamed China for causing 64,000 fentanyl deaths in the United States in 2021 "because they are pretty much the lone supplier of [fentanyl] precursor chemicals and pre-precursor chemicals, which they are shipping to Mexico". He called on the country to increase enforcement of its anti-money laundering laws and to prevent manufacturers from exporting precursor chemicals to Mexico through cooperation with U.S. agencies, including the Drug Enforcement Administration and the Office of National Drug Control Policy. He also encouraged the United States to increase its education, treatment, and prevention programs, calling it "the only chance we've got".

In January 2023, Trone sent a letter to U.S. secretary of state Antony Blinken calling on him to refuse negotiations with China on other topics until the country promised to do more to curb the fentanyl crisis.

==== Iran ====
In April 2016, Trone said he would have voted against the Iran nuclear deal framework. In October 2020, he said he opposed the decision to leave the nuclear deal after signing it.

Trone spoke in support of the Mahsa Amini protests in Iran in 2022. He also called on the European Union to designate Iran's Islamic Revolutionary Guard Corps as a terrorist organization in 2023.

==== Israel ====
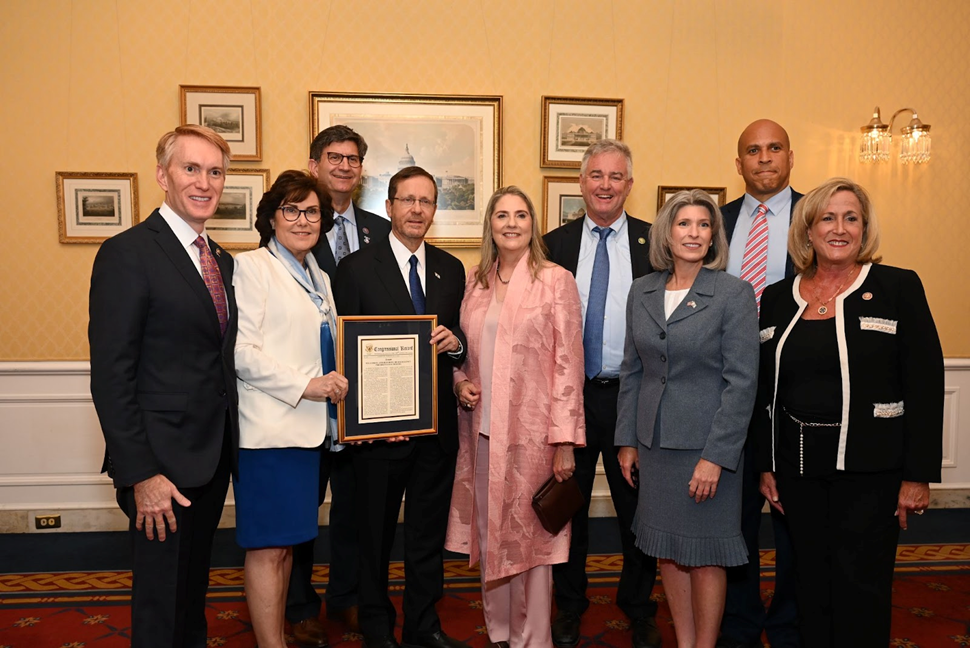
Trone and other members of the Abraham Accords Caucus meet with Israeli President Isaac Herzog, 2023

Trone supports a two-state solution to the Israeli–Palestinian conflict and opposes the Boycott, Divestment and Sanctions (BDS) movement. He disagreed with President Donald Trump's decision to relocate the United States Embassy in Israel in Jerusalem. Trone is a "minyan" donor to the American Israel Public Affairs Committee, which requires a minimum annual gift of $100,000 and is the highest membership level in the group.

In March 2018, Trone said he would vote for the Taylor Force Act, which would stop American economic aid to the Palestinian Authority unless it stops payments to individuals who commit acts of terrorism and to the families of deceased terrorists. He also said he supported the Israel Anti-Boycott Act, which would make it a federal crime for Americans to encourage or participate in boycotts against Israel and Israeli settlements in the West Bank if protesting actions by the Israeli government. In December 2018, before being sworn into office, he traveled with a bipartisan group of freshmen House members to Israel, during which he met with Israeli prime minister Benjamin Netanyahu, opposition leader Tzipi Livni, and Palestine Liberation Organization lead negotiator Saeb Erekat.

In 2019, Trone voted for a resolution condemning the BDS movement. In 2023, he co-sponsored an amendment to the 2023 National Defense Authorization Act that would require the U.S. Department of Defense to report on whether any of its contractors support BDS.

Trone said he did not support conditioning U.S. foreign aid on Israeli actions in October 2020, including annexing the West Bank. Trone co-founded the Abraham Accords Caucus in January 2022, a caucus aimed at supporting normalization agreements between Israel and Arab states. Trone co-signed a letter to United Nations ambassador Linda Thomas-Greenfield in December 2022 calling for the United Nations commission of inquiry into alleged Israeli human rights violations to be shut down. In February 2023, he called for the removal of U.N. special rapporteur Francesca Albanese following remarks she made about recent Palestinian terrorist attacks in Israel.

In October 2023, amid the Gaza war, Trone expressed support for Israel and predicted that the country would "be forced to enter and take control of Gaza for the foreseeable future" to counter terrorism and retrieve hostages. He initially opposed calls for a ceasefire, stating that "[t]here should be no ceasefire until Hamas is completely eradicated, and all hostages are safely returned", but later expressed support for a permanent ceasefire alongside the release of all hostages held by Hamas and criticized Israel's military campaign in Gaza during a campaign event in January 2024. In December 2023, Trone was one of 95 Democrats to vote for a resolution denouncing anti-Zionism as antisemitism. In January 2024, he signed onto a letter condemning South Africa's genocide case against Israel.

==== Saudi Arabia ====
Trone supports an embargo on all weapon sales to Saudi Arabia following the assassination of Jamal Khashoggi. He declined to say whether he would support a normalization deal between Saudi Arabia and Israel. Trone introduced a resolution holding Saudi Arabia accountable for the death of Jamal Khashoggi and other human rights violations in 2021. In March 2023, Trone co-signed a letter to Crown Prince Mohammed bin Salman demanding the release of political prisoners jailed for tweeting.

==== Syria ====
In October 2019, Trone voted to condemn President Donald Trump's withdrawal of U.S. troops from northern Syria, calling the decision "morally bankrupt". In 2023, Trone voted against H.Con.Res. 21, which directed President Joe Biden to remove U.S. troops from Syria within 180 days.

=== Gun policy ===
During his 2018 campaign, Trone said he supported "common-sense gun reform" that included universal background checks and banning assault weapons. After 19 children and two adults were killed at Robb Elementary School in Uvalde, Texas, by a shooter using an AR-15, Trone voted for H.R. 1808: Assault Weapons Ban of 2022. During his 2024 U.S. Senate campaign, Trone said he supported making trigger locks on guns mandatory.

=== Health care ===
Trone supports the Affordable Care Act, calling it a "good start" but said it needed revising.

In Congress, Trone launched the Bipartisan Addiction and Mental Health Task Force and has made mental health treatment a priority during his term. He also co-chairs the Bipartisan Addiction and Mental Health Task Force with Brian Fitzpatrick. Most bills Trone has passed on these issues have been bipartisan.

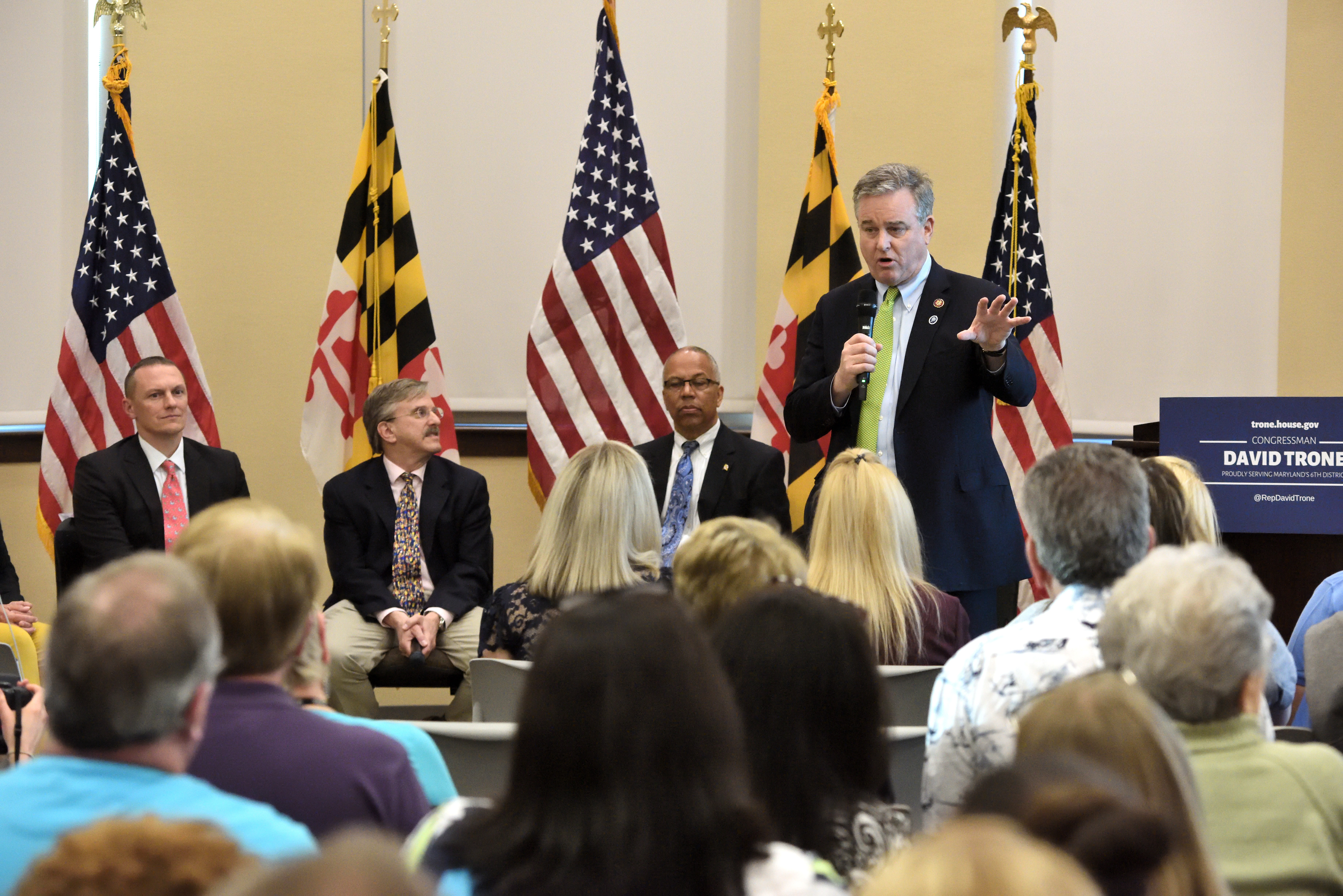
Trone hosts a workshop on the opioid epidemic, 2019

In January 2018, Trone released a $100 billion, 10-year plan aimed at confronting the opioid epidemic. The plan called for allowing the government to negotiate lower prices for overdose medication, increasing funding for the National Institutes of Health, and expanding prevention programs in schools.

At the beginning of the 2020 legislative session, Trone introduced the Preventing Mental Health and Substance Use Crises During Emergencies Act, which was signed into law by President Joe Biden in 2021. After a police officer from his district died by suicide, Trone introduced the Confidentiality Opportunities for Peer Support (COPS) Counseling Act, which provided confidential counseling for law enforcement officers. The bill was signed into law in November 2021.

=== Immigration ===
Trone opposes the construction of the Mexico–United States border wall and supports a pathway to citizenship for undocumented immigrants. In January 2019, he called for the end to the 2018–2019 federal government shutdown after Republicans proposed what he called "viable solutions to the end shutdown". which included $900 million toward border security enhancements as opposed to funding for the border wall. In June 2019, Trone voted for a bill to provide $4.6 billion in humanitarian aid to the Mexico–United States border.

During his 2024 U.S. Senate campaign, Trone supported modernizing immigration courts and putting American embassies and consulates in each country to streamline the process for applying for citizenship.

=== Minimum wage ===
In July 2019, Trone voted for the Raise the Wage Act, a bill to raise the minimum wage to $15 an hour by 2025.

=== National politics ===
In July 2019, Trone condemned President Donald Trump's comments toward members of The Squad to "go back" to the "places from which they came", tweeting that the remarks were "racist and just plain wrong". He later voted for a resolution condemning the comments. He supported both the first and second impeachment of Trump.

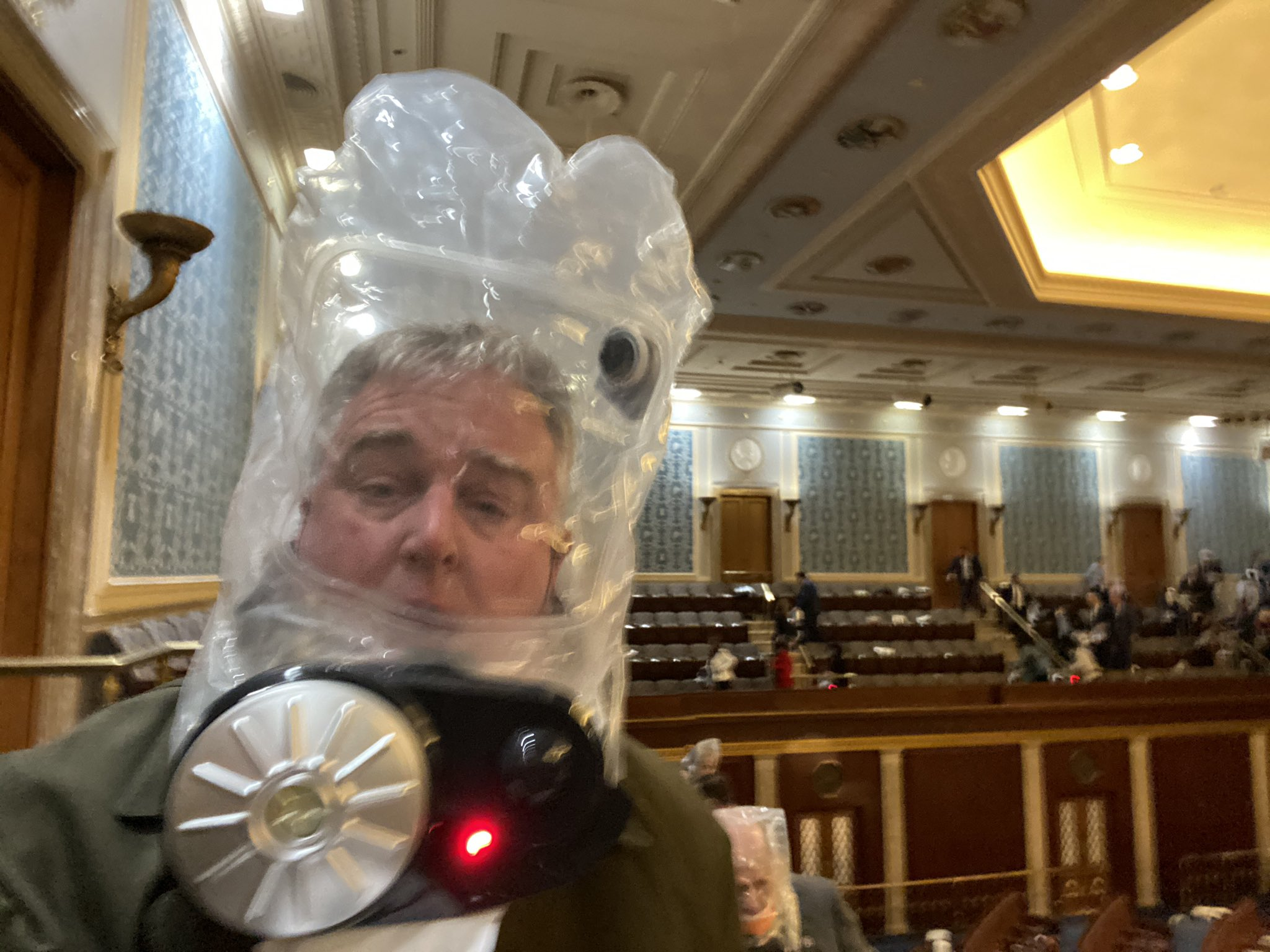
Trone evacuating the House gallery during the January 6 United States Capitol attack.

Trone was at the United States Capitol to participate in the 2021 United States Electoral College vote count when it was attacked by Trump supporters. During the attack, he tweeted a photo of himself wearing an emergency suit as he evacuated the House gallery. Following the attack, Trone called for use of the Twenty-fifth Amendment to the United States Constitution to remove Trump from office. He also faulted Republican leadership for the attack and called for a security review. He later supported a bill to establish a special commission to investigate the attack.

In March 2021, Trone co-sponsored a resolution to expel U.S. representative Marjorie Taylor Greene from Congress.

=== Social issues ===
During his 2024 U.S. Senate campaign, Trone expressed support for reparations in response to "nationwide attacks against diversity, equity, and inclusion", but did not specifically outline any plan to pay African Americans directly.

=== Taxes ===
In October 2018, Trone said he supported repealing the carried interest loophole.

== Electoral history ==
Democratic primary, Congress, Maryland 8th district, 2016
Party	Candidate	Votes	%
Democratic	Jamie Raskin	43,776	33.6
Democratic	David Trone	35,400	27.2
Democratic	Kathleen Matthews	31,186	23.9
Democratic	Ana Sol Gutierrez	7,185	5.5
Democratic	Will Jawando	6,058	4.6
Democratic	Kumar Barve	3,149	2.4
Democratic	David M. Anderson	1,511	1.2
Democratic	Joel Rubin	1,426	1.1
Democratic	Dan Bolling	712	0.5
Total votes		130,403	100.0

Democratic primary, Congress, Maryland 6th district, 2018
Party	Candidate	Votes	%
Democratic	David Trone	22,855	40.4
Democratic	Aruna Miller	17,311	30.6
Democratic	Nadia Hashimi	5,871	10.4
Democratic	Roger Manno	5,788	10.2
Democratic	Andrew Duck	2,758	4.9
Democratic	Chris Graves	900	1.6
Democratic	George English	577	1.0
Democratic	Christopher Hearsey	479	0.8
Total votes		56,539	100

Maryland's 6th congressional district, 2018
Party	Candidate	Votes	%
Democratic	David Trone	163,346	59.0
Republican	Amie Hoeber	105,209	38.0
Libertarian	Kevin Caldwell	4,972	1.8
Green	George Gluck	3,275	1.2
Write-in		282	0.1
Total votes		277,084	100.0
Democratic hold			

Democratic primary, Congress, Maryland 6th district, 2020
Party	Candidate	Votes	%
Democratic	David Trone	65,655	72.4
Democratic	Maxwell Bero	25,037	27.6
Total votes		90,692	100

Maryland's 6th congressional district, 2020
Party	Candidate	Votes	%
Democratic	David Trone (incumbent)	215,540	58.8
Republican	Neil Parrott	143,599	39.2
Green	George Gluck	6,893	1.9
Write-in		402	0.1
Total votes		366,434	100.0
Democratic hold			

Democratic primary, Congress, Maryland 6th district, 2022
Party	Candidate	Votes	%
Democratic	David Trone	44,370	79.0
Democratic	Ben Smilowitz	8,995	16.0
Democratic	George Gluck	2,789	5.0
Total votes		56,154	100

Maryland's 6th congressional district, 2022
Party	Candidate	Votes	%
Democratic	David Trone (incumbent)	140,295	54.7
Republican	Neil Parrott	115,771	45.2
Write-in		332	0.1
Total votes		256,398	100.0
Democratic hold			

United States Senate Democratic primary election in Maryland, 2024
Party	Candidate	Votes	%
Democratic	Angela Alsobrooks	357,052	53.37%
Democratic	David Trone	286,381	42.80%
Democratic	Joseph Perez	4,688	0.70%
Democratic	Michael Cobb	4,524	0.68%
Democratic	Brian Frydenborg	3,635	0.54%
Democratic	Scottie Griffin	3,579	0.53%
Democratic	Marcellus Crews	3,379	0.51%
Democratic	Andrew Wildman	2,198	0.33%
Democratic	Robert Houton	1,946	0.29%
Democratic	Steve Seuferer	1,664	0.25%
Total votes		669,046	100.00%

Democratic primary, Congress, Maryland 6th district, 2026
Party	Candidate	Votes	%
Democratic	April McClain Delaney	27,819	44.0
Democratic	David Trone	23,383	37.0
Democratic	Alexis Goldstein	6,201	9.8
Democratic	George Gluck	933	1.5
Democratic	Ethan Wechtaluk	3,469	5.5
Democratic	Kiambo White	670	1.1
Democratic	Altimont Wilks	556	0.9
Total votes		63,218	100

== Personal life ==
Trone chairs the Trone Private Sector and Education Advisory Council at the ACLU Trone Center. He has served on the Bullis School's board of trustees since 2006.

In 2012, Kids Enjoy Exercise Now (KEEN) Greater DC gave Trone the Distinguished Service Award for his contributions to the organization, which provides recreational programs for children with developmental and physical disabilities. He was honored at the 2014 Ernst & Young Entrepreneur of the Year Awards Greater Washington, in the "large company" category. In 2015, Trone was invited by the American University's Kennedy Political Union and the Kogod School of Business to speak to students and faculty about entrepreneurship and business leadership. He was awarded the Anti-Defamation League's annual achievement award in 2016. In 2016, Trone joined the boards of American University and the Montgomery County Chamber of Commerce.

In 2017, Trone received Furman University's Carl F. Kohrt Distinguished Alumni Award, which is presented "to an alumnus in recognition of significant professional or personal accomplishments and in gratitude for continued loyalty". He served on Furman University's board of trustees from 2010 to 2016.

During his 2018 campaign, Trone was diagnosed with cancer and underwent chemotherapy and surgery to remove a kidney; he was declared cancer-free by October.

In January 2023, Trone underwent scheduled surgery on his right shoulder and voted from the House floor that afternoon.

As of 2016, the Trones live in Potomac, a suburb of Washington. His home is just outside the 6th's borders. Members of the House are required to live in the state they represent, not the particular district.

Trone was raised Lutheran. His wife and all four children are Jewish and attend Temple Beth Ami in Rockville. His nephew, Ian, died of an overdose from fentanyl in 2016 after battling a heroin addiction, leading to Trone's focus on the issue in Congress.

Holt McCallany plays Trone in the 2026 film Clean Hands.

== See also ==
- List of people from Potomac, Maryland

U.S. House of Representatives
Preceded by John Delaney	Member of the U.S. House of Representatives from Maryland's 6th congressional district 2019–2025	Succeeded by April McClain Delaney
U.S. order of precedence (ceremonial)
Preceded by Anthony Brown as Former U.S. Representative	Order of precedence of the United States as Former U.S. Representative	Succeeded by Thomas Hartnett as Former U.S. Representative
