= Charles Butterworth =

Charles Butterworth may refer to:

- Charles Butterworth (philosopher) (born 1938), American political philosopher
- Charles Butterworth (actor) (1899–1946), American actor
