= CAPC =

CAPC may refer to:

- CAPC musée d'art contemporain de Bordeaux, a contemporary art museum in Bordeaux, France
- Campaign Against Political Correctness, a non-partisan organisation in the United Kingdom
- Capitaine de corvette, or naval Lieutenant-commander
- Capital & Counties Properties (Capco), a United Kingdom-based property investment and development company
- Center for American Politics and Citizenship, a non-partisan Government and Politics research center at the University of Maryland, College Park
- Companion Animal Parasite Council, a non-profit organization
