= University of Maryland College of Behavioral and Social Sciences =

College of the University of Maryland, College Park

Coordinates: 38°59′15.0″N 76°56′24.0″W

College of Behavioral and Social Sciences
- Type: Public
- Established: 1919
- Dean: Gregory F. Ball
- Location: Tydings Hall, College Park, Maryland, United States
- Campus: Suburban
- Website: bsos.umd.edu

The College of Behavioral and Social Sciences is the school of social sciences at the University of Maryland, College Park. It consists of nine academic departments.

== History ==
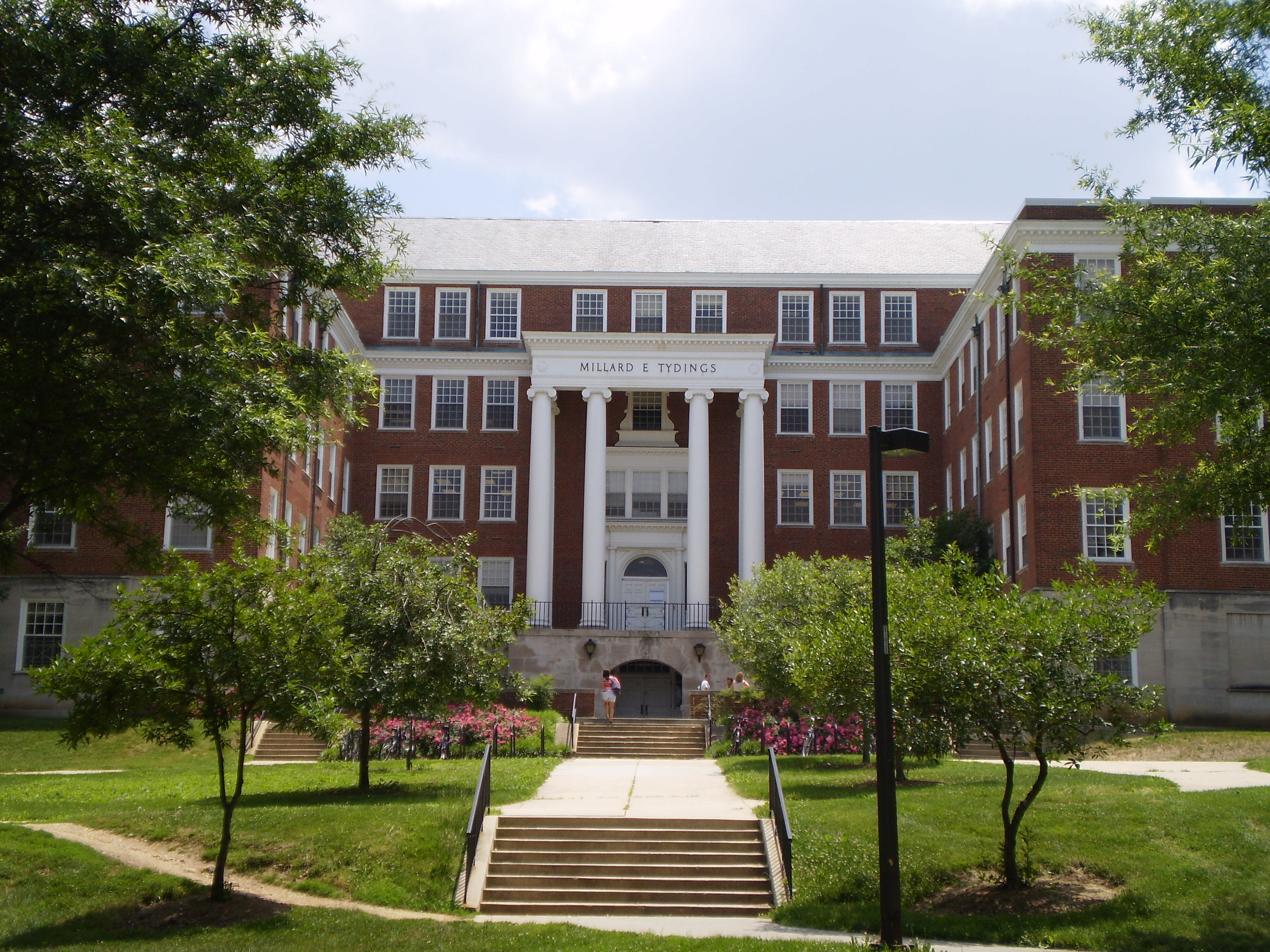
North view of Millard E. Tydings Hall, home to the College of Behavioral and Social Sciences as well as the Department of Economics and the Department Government & Politics

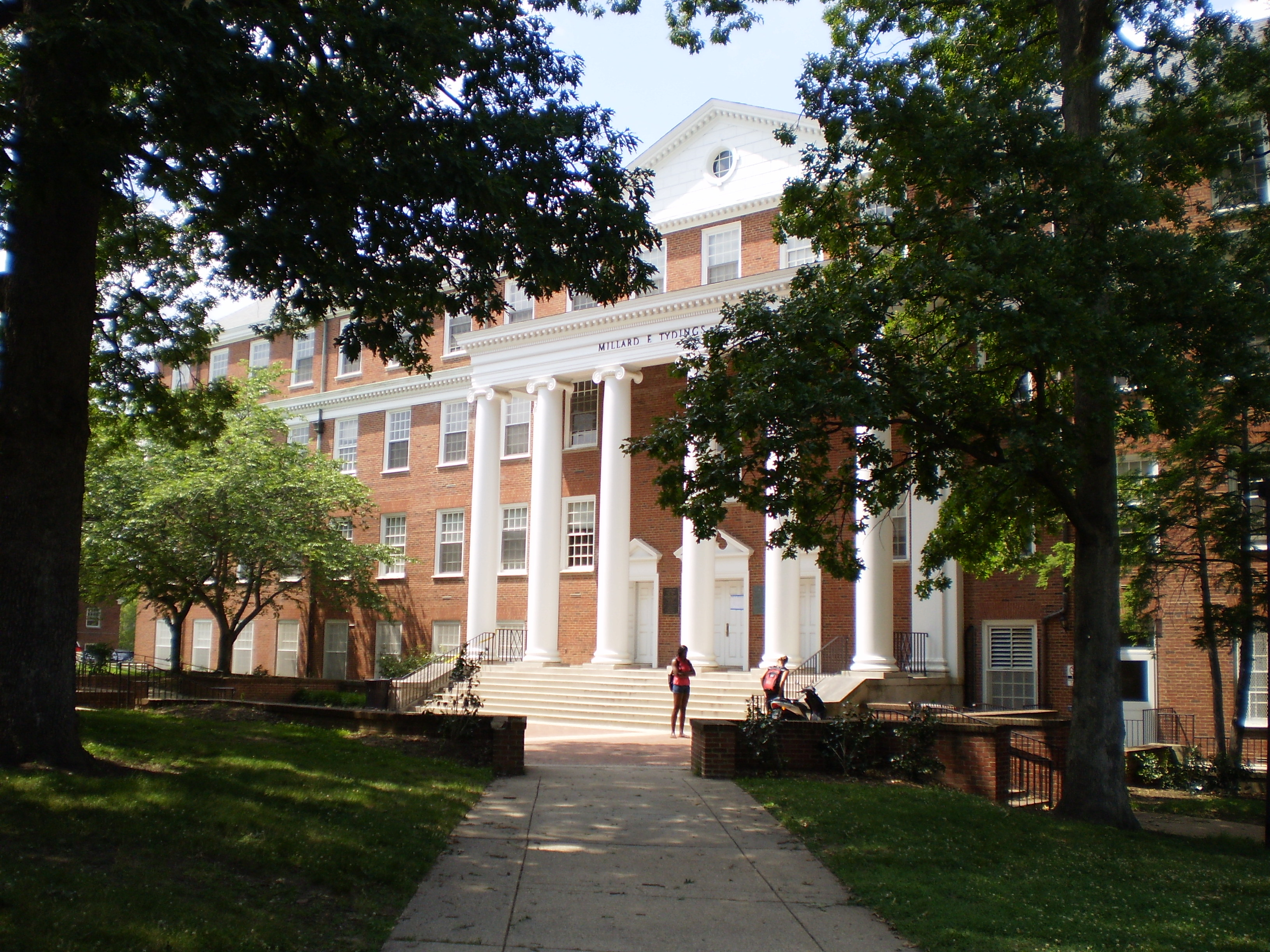
South view of Tydings Hall

The College of Behavioral and Social Sciences began as "The School of Liberal Arts" in 1919, and was headquartered in Morrill Hall; Frederic E. Lee served as the school's first dean. In the 1920s, it became "The College of Arts and Sciences," with five separate divisions. In 1936, the college moved into the newly completed College of Arts and Sciences Building, which was renamed Francis Scott Key Hall in 1955. In the 1940s, the departments of economics, of geography and of government and politics moved into the College of Business and Public Administration.

In 1972, the College of Arts and Sciences and the College of Business and Public Administration combined to become the new "Division of Behavioral and Social Sciences", one of five divisions in the university. In 1986, the five divisions split into fourteen colleges, and The College of Behavioral and Social Sciences was formed. The college has been headquartered in Millard E. Tydings Hall since 1993.

== Departments ==
Department	US News Rankings
African American Studies Department	N/A (Note: No rankings available for discipline.)
Department of Anthropology	N/A
Department of Criminology and Criminal Justice	1
Department of Economics	21
Department of Geography	N/A
Department of Government and Politics	28
Department of Hearing & Speech Sciences	18
Joint Program in Survey Methodology (Note: A joint program with the University of Michigan.)	N/A
Department of Psychology	40
Department of Sociology	20

== Faculty ==
There are two endowed chairs within the College of Behavioral and Social Sciences: the Anwar Sadat Chair for Peace and Development, currently held by Shibley Telhami, and the Bahá'í Chair for World Peace, currently held by John Grayzel, are at the Center for International Development and Conflict Management, which is a center within the Department of Government and Politics.

Notable faculty in the College include:

- Gar Alperovitz (Department of Government and Politics)
- Charles Butterworth (Department of Government and Politics)
- Patricia Hill Collins (Department of Sociology)
- Ruth DeFries (Department of Geography), member of the National Academy of Sciences and MacArthur Fellow
- Ted Robert Gurr (Department of Government and Politics)
- Mark P. Leone (Department of Anthropology)
- George Ritzer (Department of Sociology)
- Jehan Al Sadat (Center for International Development and Conflict Management)
- Thomas Schelling (Department of Economics), winner of the Nobel Prize in Economics and member of the National Academy of Sciences
- Shibley Telhami (Department of Government and Politics)
- Vladimir Tismăneanu (Department of Government and Politics)

Notable former faculty members include:

- Oliver Edwin Baker (Department of Geography)
- John W. Dorsey (Department of Economics)
- Parris Glendening (Department of Government and Politics)
- Edward B. Montgomery (Department of Economics)
- Mancur Olson (Department of Economics)
- Carmen Reinhart (Department of Economics)
- John W. Snow (Department of Economics)
- Ron Walters (Department of Government and Politics)

== Notable alumni ==
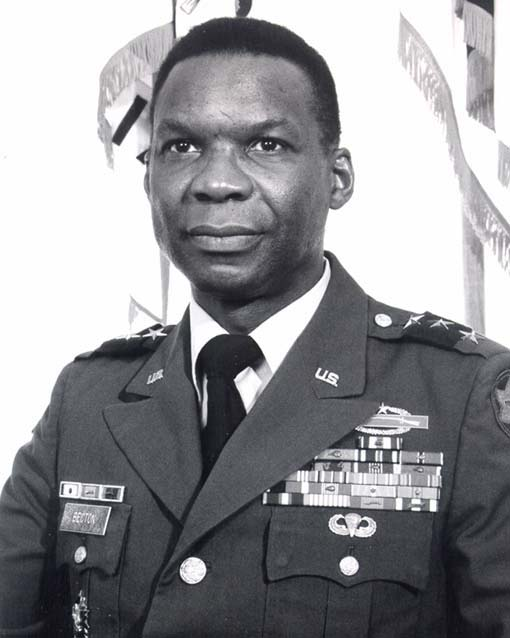
Lt. General Julius W. Becton, Jr., former Federal Emergency Management Agency (FEMA) Director

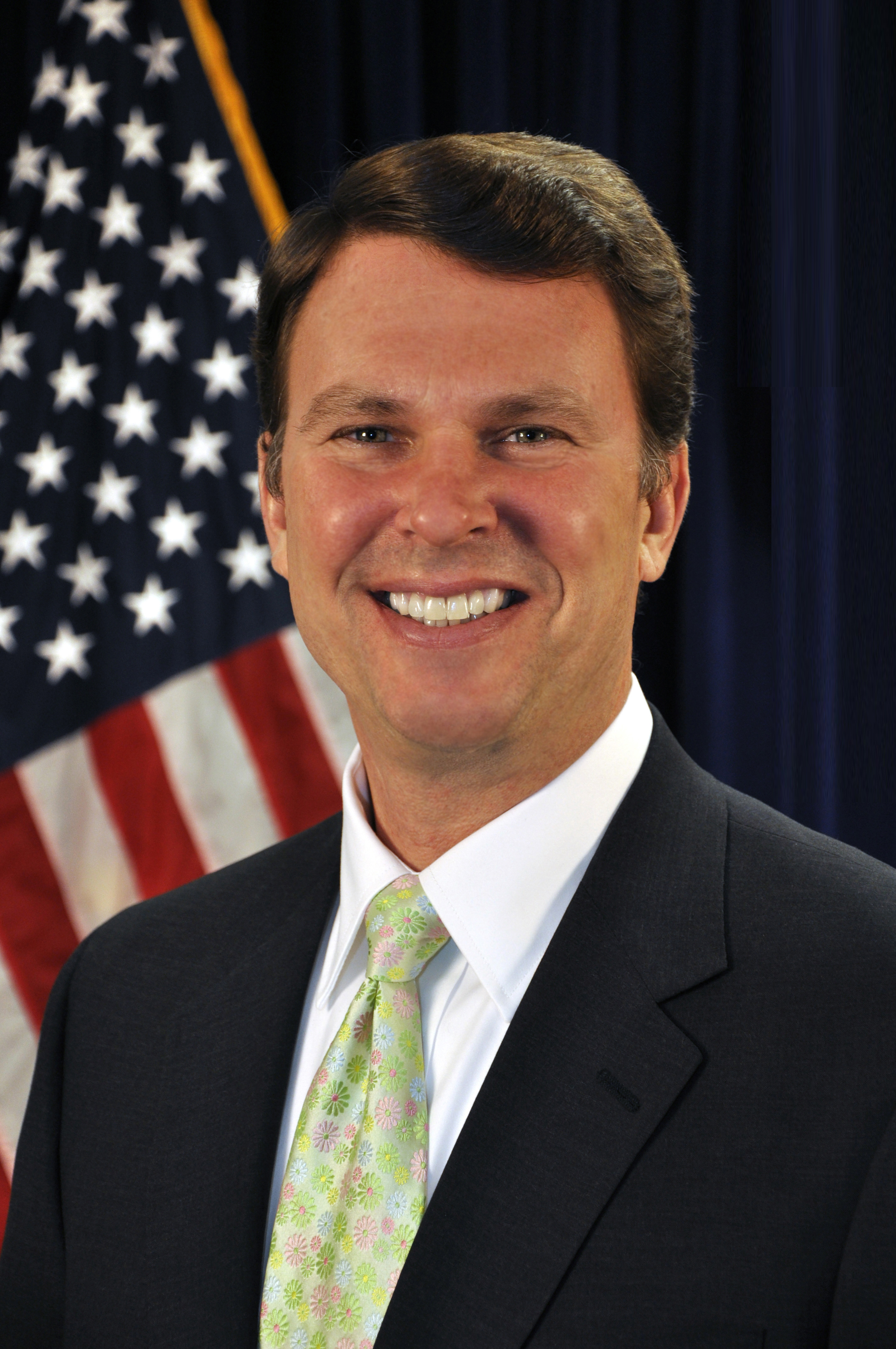
John Berry, former director of the United States Office of Personnel Management and ambassador to Australia

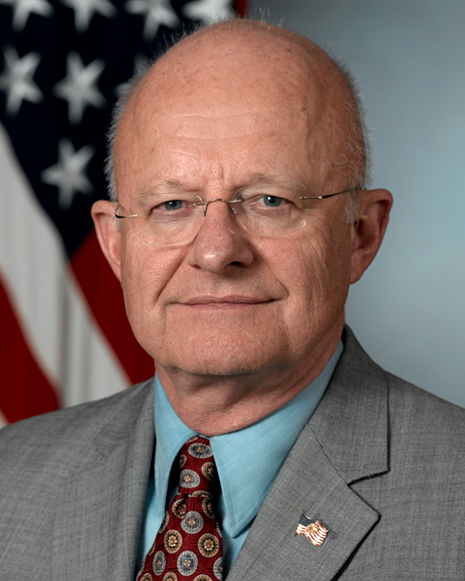
James Clapper, 4th Director of National Intelligence

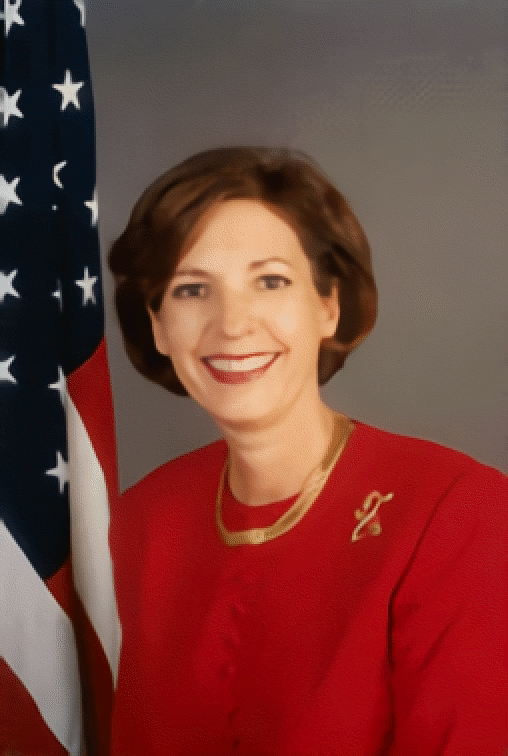
Prudence Bushnell, former United States Ambassador to Kenya and Guatemala

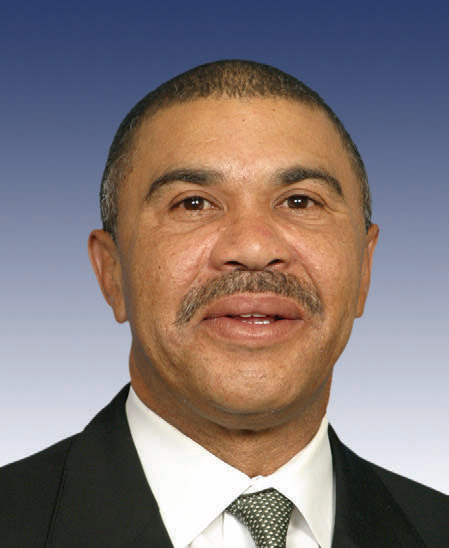
Missouri Congressman William Lacy Clay, Jr.

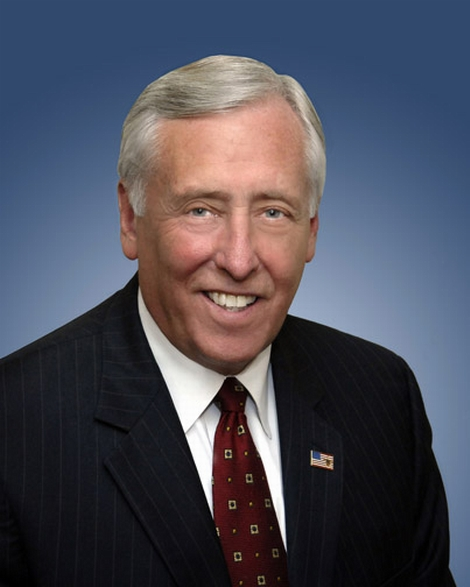
House Majority Leader Steny Hoyer

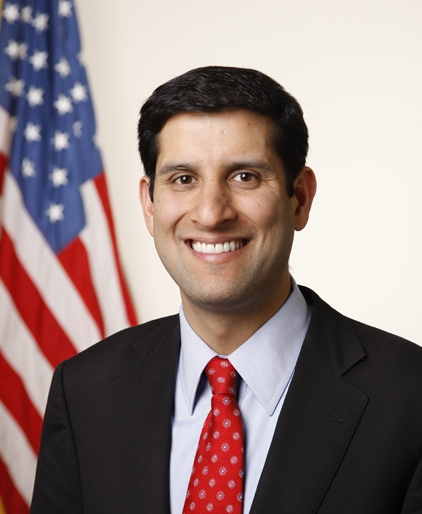
Vivek Kundra, 1st chief information officer of the United States

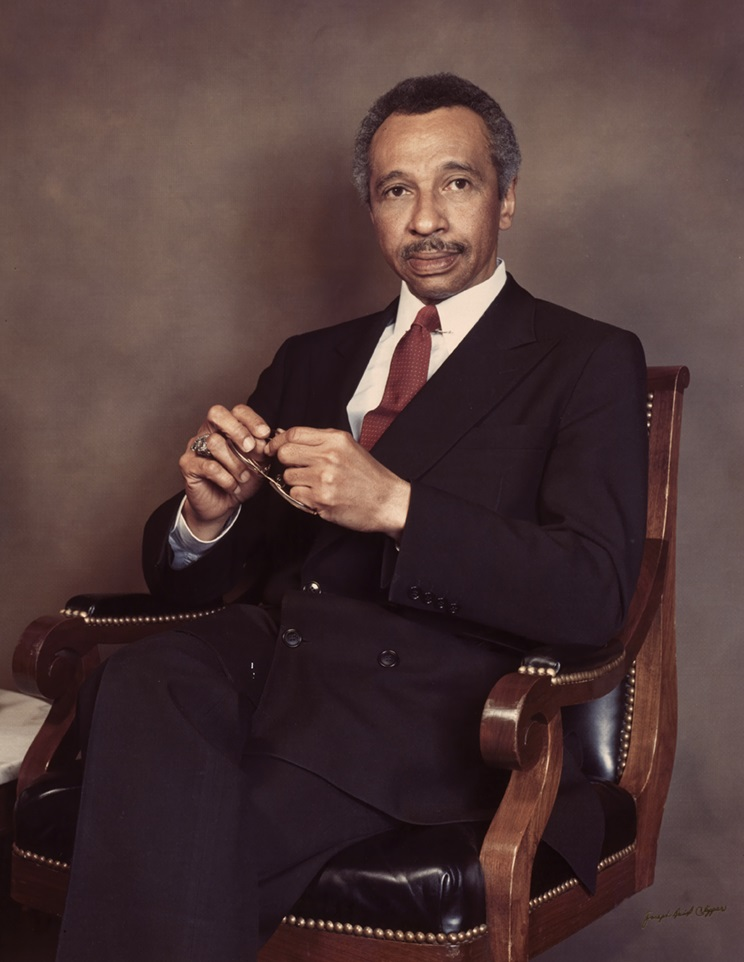
Former congressman Parren Mitchell

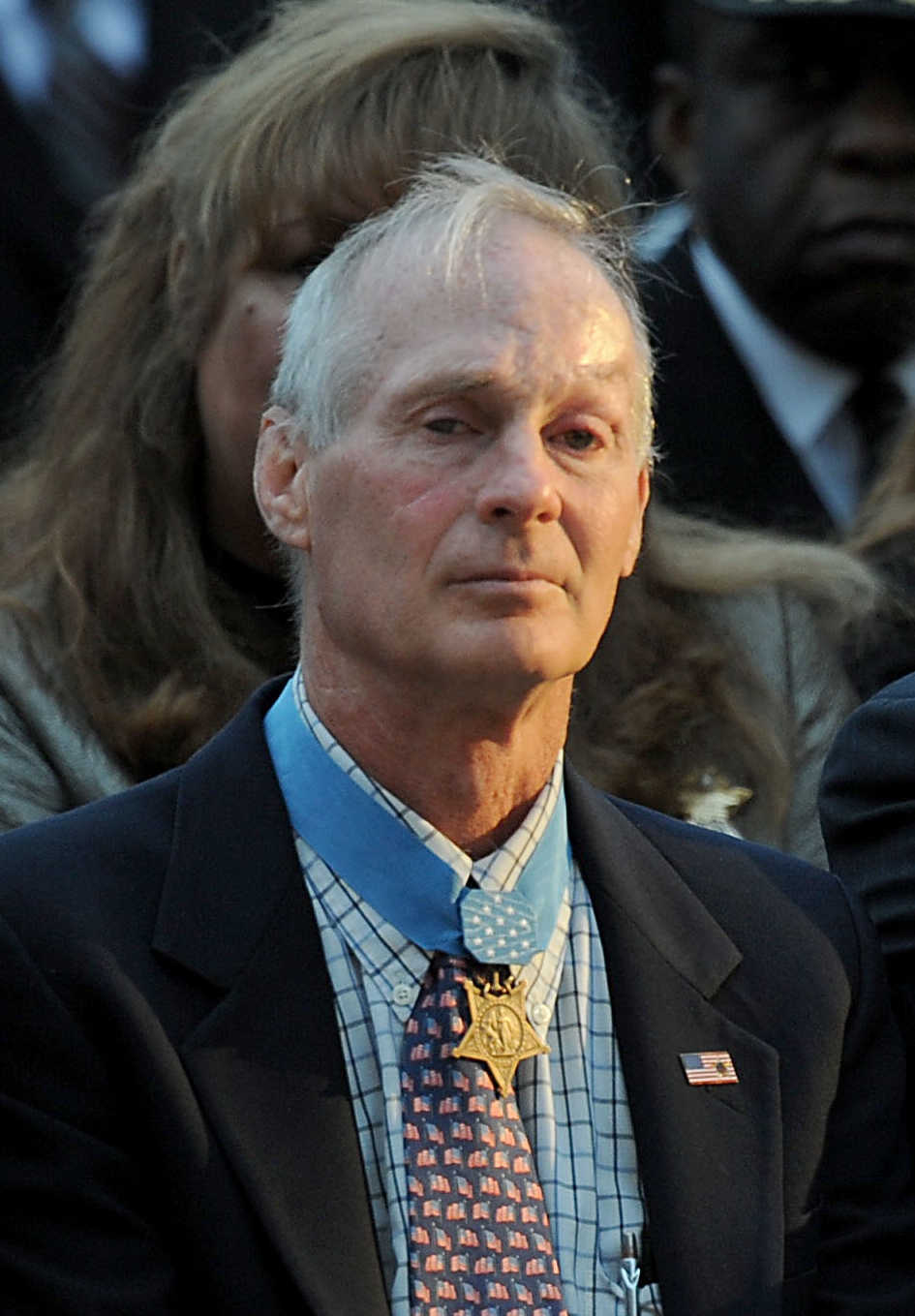
Medal of Honor winner Thomas R. Norris

Other prominent alumni include: Eric F. Billings, Chairman and chief executive officer of FBR Capital Markets Corporation; John Dryzek, social and political theorist; Robert W. Jordan, former U.S. ambassador to Saudi Arabia; Kori Schake, former director for defense strategy and requirements on the National Security Council; Charles Schultze, former chairman of the United States Council of Economic Advisers; and Torrey Smith, a retired football wide receiver and 2-time Super Bowl champion.

== See also ==
- List of Sadat Lecture for Peace Speakers
- Minorities at Risk
