= Brooke Eby =

American advocate for people with ALS (1988–2026)

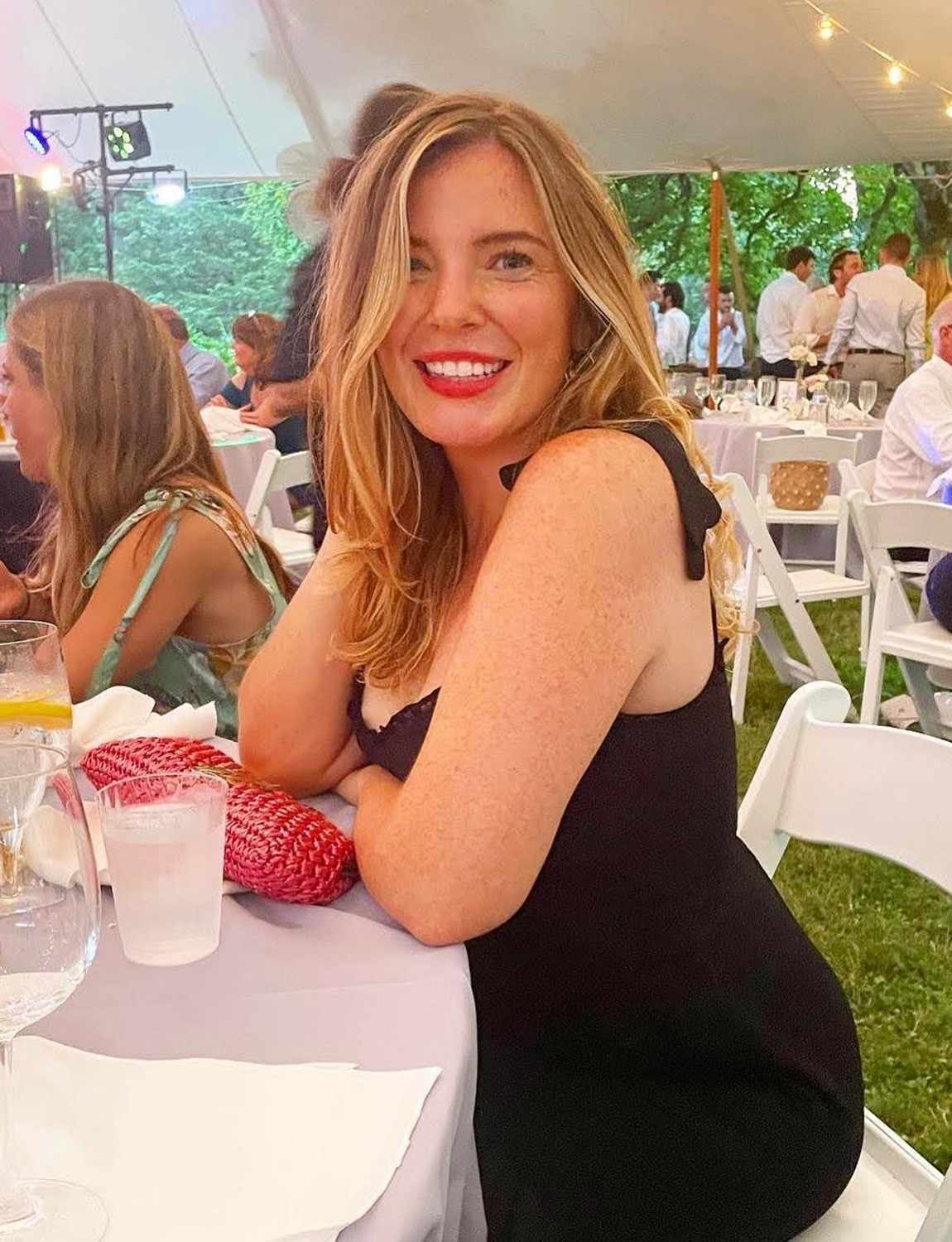
- Eby in 2019
- Born: Brooke Elizabeth Eby; December 22, 1988; Potomac, Maryland, U.S.
- Died: October 1, 2026 (aged 37); Maryland, U.S.
- Education: Lehigh University, BA Business Information Systems
- Occupation: Social media personality
- Known for: ALS advocacy

Brooke Elizabeth Eby (December 22, 1988 – October 1, 2026) was an American social media personality who was diagnosed with the terminal motor neuron disease amyotrophic lateral sclerosis (ALS) in 2022. An advocate for people with the disease, she shared her experience on social media and founded the support network ALS Together.

== Early life and education ==
Eby was born in Potomac, Maryland, on December 22, 1988, to Clifford Eby, an engineer, and Eugenia Eby (née Eiselman), who worked in politics. In her early adolescence she appeared in several TV commercials and as a minor character in the 2003 film Holes. She attended Lehigh University and graduated in 2010 with a degree in business information systems.

== Salesforce and ALS ==
Eby began her career in the business sector, holding positions in cities including New York and San Francisco. In 2016, she joined Salesforce as a business development manager.

Eby first experienced symptoms of ALS in 2018, starting with tightness in her calf and difficulty walking. She was diagnosed with ALS in 2022. Eby continued in her role at Salesforce, adapting her work setup as needed. As the disease progressed, she transitioned from walking aids to a wheelchair and moved back to her parents' home in Potomac for additional support.

== Advocacy ==
Following her diagnosis, Eby launched social media accounts under the handle "limpbroozkit" to document her experience. She had more than 500,000 followers across social media platforms as of 2026.

In 2023, Eby founded ALStogether, a Slack-based community designed to connect people with ALS and their caregivers to share resources and support. She also participated in public speaking engagements at corporate and nonprofit events and conferences. She received the Advocate of the Year award from the ALS Network in March 2026.

Eby participated in research studies and communicated with other ALS patients to share insights and experiences. She collaborated with Silverts to create Brooke Eby x Silverts, an adaptive clothing line.

== Death ==
Eby died of complications from ALS on October 1, 2026, at the age of 37.

== See also ==
- List of people from Potomac, Maryland
- List of people with motor neuron disease
