= OASIS in the Middle East Act =

United States Congress
- Long title: Optimizing Acquisition Strategies for Integrated Security in the Middle East Act
- Introduced: June 4, 2026
- Status: Pending

The Optimizing Acquisition Strategies for Integrated Security in the Middle East Act, commonly known as the OASIS in the Middle East Act, is a proposed 2026 Act of Congress introduced by Senators Jacky Rosen, Joni Ernst, Cory Booker, and James Lankford to "develop an air and missile defense acquisition strategy with partners and allies in the Middle East, including Israel and Abraham Accords partners".

All four senators are founding members and co-chairs of the Senate Abraham Accords Caucus.

== Provisions ==
The Act builds on previous legislation sponsored by the Caucus, including the DEFEND Act. It was introduced in advance of the Senate’s markup of the 2027 National Defense Authorization Act (NDAA).

== Legislative history ==
The Act was introduced on June 4, 2026.

The Act was subsequently paralleled within the Senate's version of the 2027 National Defense Authorization Act (NDAA), which includes provisions for the initiative to "bolster defense cooperation among the United States and signatories of the Abraham Accords."
