= Paul Laudicina =

- Born: 9 October 1949; Brooklyn
- Education: University of Chicago
- Occupation: Management consultant
- Years active: 1991–present
- Employer: A.T. Kearney
- Title: Partner and Chairman Emeritus; Chairman, Global Business Policy Council

Paul A. Laudicina (born August 9, 1949) is the chairman of the Global Business Policy Council, Partner and Chairman Emeritus of A.T. Kearney. He was elected as the manager officer of A.T. Kearney in September 2006 after the management buyout of the firm from EDS and was re-elected to a second term in 2009. Laudicina is also the founder and Chairman of A.T. Kearney's Global Business Policy Council, a strategic service for CEOs. He currently serves as a member of the President's Export Council.

He is also the author of numerous articles and books and a speaker on economic issues. He featured as one of the "Top 25 Most Influential Consultants" by Consulting Magazine in 2005 and 2007.

== Education ==
He holds a bachelor's degree in political science from the University of Chicago.

== Career ==
His career has included positions as research associate for the UN Center for Economic and Social Information, Associate Fellow of the Overseas Development Council, Legislative Director in the United States Senate, and Vice President of SRI International (Stanford Research Institute), where he founded its policy division.

In 2020, Laudicina was named a volunteer member of the Joe Biden presidential transition Agency Review Team to support transition efforts related to the Department of Commerce.

He is a member of a number of professional associations:

- American Economic Association
- Academy of Political Science
- Council on Foreign Relations
- Vice Chancellor of the International Academy of Management

He is a member of the Executive's Club of Chicago, and attended the World Economic Forum in 2008, 2009, and 2012.

== Books ==
- World Out of Balance: Navigating Global Risks to Seize Competitive Advantage. New York: McGraw-Hill, 2005. ISBN 978-0-07-143918-3. It has been published in French, as Le désordre du monde : les grands axes de l'avenir, in German as Trendbuch Internationalisierung : wie Ihr Unternehmen vom Wandel profitiert, in Japanese as 明日の世界を読む力 : ビジネスリーダーのための / Asu no sekai o yomu chikara : Bijinesurīdā no tameno,
- World poverty and development: a survey of American opinion Washington, Overseas Development Council, 1973 OCLC 866226; the book was reviewed in The American Political Science Review, March 1977, vol. 71, no. 1, p. 418–419.
- Beating the Global Odds: Successful Decision-Making in a Confused and Troubled World Hoboken, New Jersey: John Wiley & Sons Inc., 2012
