= Abraham Accords Caucus =

- Leader: Brad Schneider (IL-10); Ann Wagner (MO-02); Debbie Wasserman Schultz (FL-25); Craig Goldman (TX-12)

The Abraham Accords Caucus is a bipartisan caucus of U.S. legislators in support of the Abraham Accords, which normalized diplomatic relations between Israel and several Arab states.

== Mission ==
The mission of the Abrahams Accords Caucus is to expand the accords and advance regional security. The Caucus was established on January 10, 2022. The Caucus was subsequently relaunched on February 21, 2025.

In June 2026, Caucus has sponsored legislation in support of the expansion of the accords to Central Asia and the South Caucasus through the Abraham Accords Expansion Act of 2026, and coordinated air defense through the OASIS in the Middle East Act.

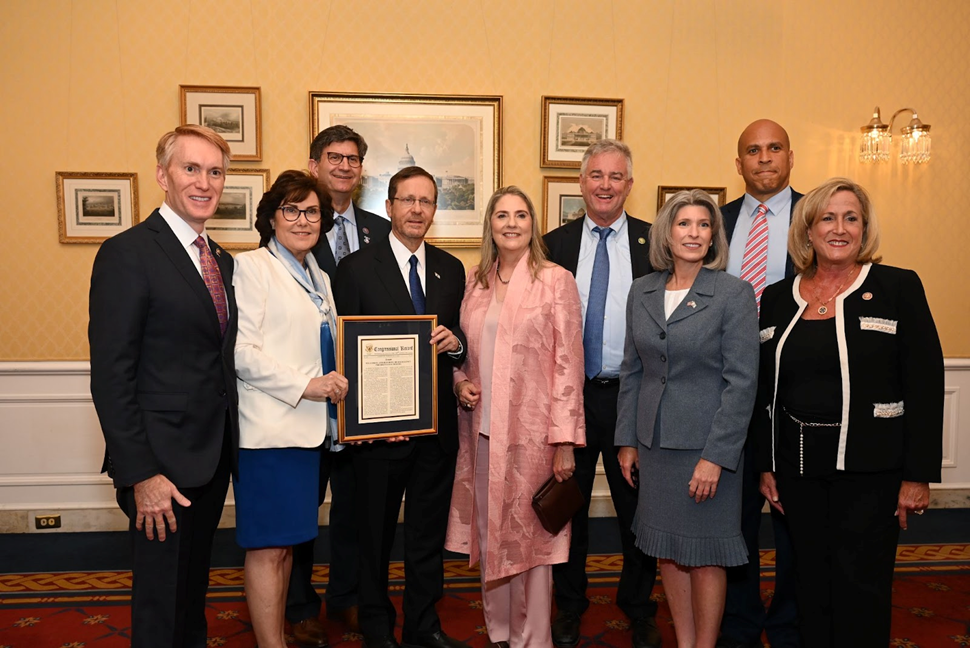
Members of the Abraham Accords Caucus meet with Israeli President Isaac Herzog, 2023

== House members, 119th Congress ==
Name	Party	District
Brad Schneider		
Ann Wagner		
Debbie Wasserman Schultz		
Craig Goldman		

== Senate members, 119th Congress ==
Name	Party	State
Jacky Rosen	Democratic	Nevada
Joni Ernst	Republican	Iowa
James Lankford	Republican	Oklahoma
Cory Booker	Democratic	New Jersey
