= Charles Butterworth (philosopher) =

American philosopher

Charles E. Butterworth (born 1938) is a philosopher of the Straussian school and currently an emeritus professor of political philosophy at the University of Maryland, College Park.

Butterworth is also a translator and editor of numerous books about the philosophers Rousseau, Alfarabi, and Averroes. In 2024, he received the Sheikh Hamad Prize for Translation and International Understanding, Arabic to English, Achievement Award, https://hta.qa/winners and in 2025 the Barry Prize for Distinguished Intellectual Achievement along with membership in the American Academy of Sciences and Letters, https://academysciencesletters.org/2025-barry-prize/ also https://bsos.umd.edu/featured-content/charles-butterworth-receives-barry-prize-american-academy-sciences-and-letters.

== Early life and education ==
Butterworth received his B.A. from Michigan State University. He trained in political philosophy and Arabic as well as Islamic civilization at the University of Chicago, where he received an M.A. and Ph.D. in political science. He has also studied at the Ain Shams University in Egypt, the University of Bordeaux, and the University of Nancy in France (receiving a doctorate in philosophy from the latter).

== Career ==
Before joining the faculty of the University of Maryland, Butterworth taught at the University of Chicago and Federal City College (now the University of the District of Columbia). He has also taught at St. John's College, Georgetown University, and Harvard University, in addition to Marmara University, Birzeit University, the University of Bordeaux, the University of Grenoble, the University of Paris I (Sorbonne), the University of Paris X (Nanterre), and the École pratique des hautes études.

For several years he was the Principal Investigator for the Smithsonian-sponsored Project in Medieval Islamic Logic in Cairo. He has also been the Principal Investigator for a project on medieval Islamic logic sponsored by the National Endowment for the Humanities and has organized a two-week Salzburg seminar on the Commonality of Cultural Traditions: Judaism, Christianity, and Islam.

In 1992–1993, he was a fellow at the Woodrow Wilson International Center for Scholars in Washington, D.C. during which time he pursued a project on the relationship between revelation and political philosophy. From October 1999 until March 2000, Butterworth held a Fulbright Senior Scholar Research and Lecturing Award at the University of Erlangen–Nuremberg, Germany, and from May through August 2000 a German Academic Exchange Professorship at the same university. Also, during May and June 2000, he gave a series of lectures at the Institut du Monde Arabe in Paris entitled "Des origines de la philosophie politique en Islam."

At the University of Maryland, he has been recognized as a Distinguished Scholar-Teacher (1990–91) and he received an award in Excellence in Teaching and Mentorship (2001–02) granted by the College of Behavioral and Social Sciences.

== See also ==
- American philosophy
- List of American philosophers
