= Eric F. Billings =

American businessman

Eric Francis Billings
- Born: 1954 (age 71–72)
- Occupation: Chairman of Arlington Asset Investment

Eric Francis Billings (born 1954) is an American businessman and financier who has served as the chairman of Arlington Asset Investment (NYSE: AI) since June 2006. Arlington Asset Investment Corp. was previously known as FBR Capital Markets Corporation prior to 2009.

Billings has served on the board of directors of Arlington Asset Investment Corp. since the company's formation in June 2006. He has also served as a director of the company since June 2006. Billings was also the chairman and chief executive officer of FBR Group, a position he assumed in April 2005. Prior to April 2005, Billings served as co-chairman and co-chief executive officer of FBR Group, a firm he co-founded in 1989.

As co-founder of FBR Group, Billings helped build the company into one of the largest investment banking and brokerage firms focusing on the U.S. middle market.
