= Arlington Asset Investment =

Real estate investment company in Virginia, USA

Arlington Asset Investment Corp.
- Type: Public company
- Traded as: NYSE: AAIC (Class A)
- Industry: Real estate investment trust
- Founded: 1989; 37 years ago
- Fate: Merged with Ellington Financial
- Headquarters: McLean, Virginia, United States
- Key people: J. Rock Tonkel, Jr., President & CEO; Richard E. Konzmann, CFO; Daniel E. Berce, Chairman
- Revenue: ▼$26 million (2021)
- Net income: ▼$12 million (2021)
- Total assets: ▼$803 million (2021)
- Total equity: ▼$224 million (2021)
- Number of employees: 11 (2021)
- Website: www.arlingtonasset.com

Arlington Asset Investment Corp. is a mortgage real estate investment trust headquartered in McLean, Virginia. It is an investment firm that focuses primarily on investing in mortgage related assets and residential real estate.

On December 14, 2023, the firm completed its merger with NYSE-listed Ellington Financial.

== History ==
The company was founded as Friedman, Billings, Ramsey Group Inc. in 1989 by Emmanuel Friedman, Eric Billings, and Russ Ramsey. In 1997, it became a public company via an initial public offering, raising $206 million. Ramsey left the company in 2001.

Following the early 2000s recession, FBR Group invested heavily in subprime mortgages. During the subprime mortgage crisis, the company incurred severe losses related to its underperforming mortgage origination platform and widespread problems in subprime mortgage lending, which led to a sale of ownership in FBR's subprime subsidiary, First NLC Financial Services, in the summer of 2007.

Friedman left FBR Group in 2005. In June 2007, FBR Capital Markets was formed through a corporate spin-off from FBR Group.

From its founding through 2008, FBR Group was taxed as a real estate investment trust. Starting in 2009, the company converted to a C corporation to use its net operating loss carry-forwards and net capital loss carry-forwards to shield substantially all of its income from income taxes.

In May 2009, a month before changing its name to Arlington Asset Investment Corp., it sold a portion of its investment in FBR Capital Markets for $72.5 million. In October 2009, the remaining investment in FBR Capital Markets was sold for $84.1 million.

When he stepped down as CEO in June 2014, Eric Billings became its Executive Chairman. Appointed CEO, J. Rock Tonkel Jr. served as the company's president and Chief Operating Officer.

In 2019, the year Billing retired, the firm converted back to a real estate investment trust after it had used its net operating loss carry-forwards. From the following year onwards, it began to transition the company from primarily a levered agency MBS strategy to one focused on multiple investment channels in mortgage servicing rights, single-family residential rental properties, credit investments and agency MBS.

== Investments ==
The company's investment capital is currently allocated between the following assets classes:

- mortgage servicing right ("MSR") related assets
- credit investments
- single family residential ("SFR") properties
- agency mortgage-backed security ("MBS")

The company's MSR related assets represent investments for which the return is based on the economic performance of a pool of specific MSRs.

An MSR provides a mortgage servicer with the right to service a pool of residential mortgage loans in exchange for a portion of the interest payments made on underlying residential mortgage loans. Its credit investments generally include those in mortgage loans secured by either residential or commercial real property or MBS collateralized by residential or commercial mortgage loans ("non-agency MBS") or asset-backed security ("ABS") collateralized by residential solar panel loans.

The firm 's SFR investment strategy is to acquire, lease and operate single-family residential homes as rental properties. In turn, its MBS agency consist of residential pass-through certificates for which the principal and interest payments are guaranteed by a U.S. government sponsored enterprise ("GSE"), such as Fannie Mae or Freddie Mac.

== Sponsorship ==
The company sponsored the Phoenix Open PGA golf tournament held in Scottsdale, Arizona from 2004 until 2009.
