= Rising Sun, Maryland =

- Town
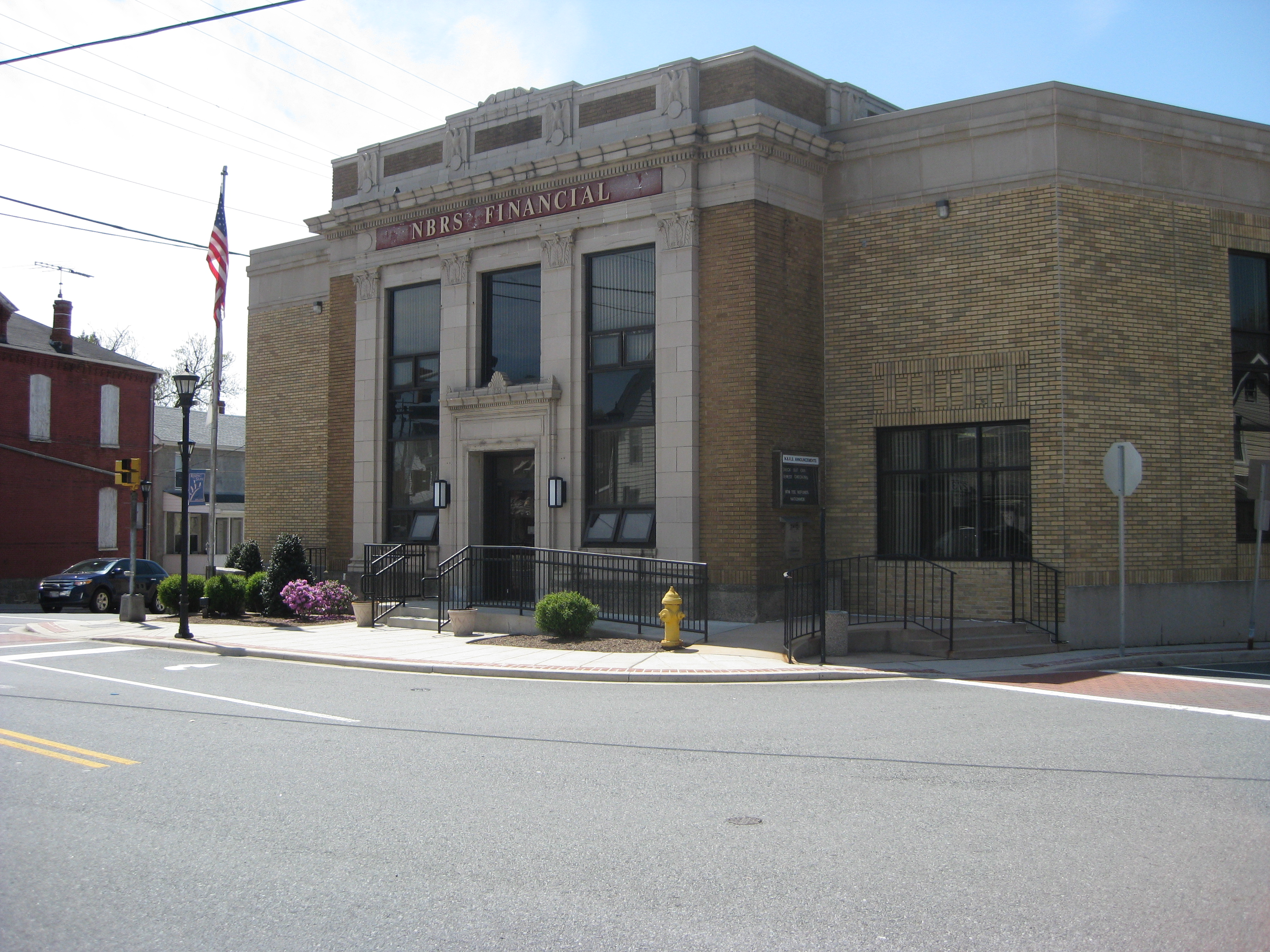
- The historic bank building in Rising Sun

- Flag Logo

- Location of Rising Sun, Maryland
- Coordinates: 39°41′58″N 76°3′47″W
- Country: United States
- State: Maryland
- County: Cecil
- Incorporated: 1860

Government
  - Mayor: Travis Marion

Area
  - Total: 1.66 sq mi (4.29 km^{2})
  - Land: 1.63 sq mi (4.21 km^{2})
  - Water: 0.027 sq mi (0.07 km^{2})
- Elevation: 390 ft (119 m)

Population (2020)
  - Total: 2,740
  - Density: 1,684.4/sq mi (650.35/km^{2})
- Time zone: UTC-5 (Eastern (EST))
  - Summer (DST): UTC-4 (EDT)
- ZIP code: 21911
- Area code: 410
- FIPS code: 24-66275
- GNIS feature ID: 0595204
- Website: http://www.risingsunmd.org/

Rising Sun is a town in Cecil County, Maryland, United States. As of the 2020 census, Rising Sun had a population of 2,740.

== History ==
The town which became known as Rising Sun was located in the disputed “Nottingham Lots” along the border between colonial Pennsylvania and Maryland. This area was claimed by William Penn and settled by Quakers in 1702 over the objection of Maryland. When Charles Mason and Jeremiah Dixon conducted a survey of the order in the 1760s, Rising Sun was found to be located in Maryland.

Around 1720, Henry Reynolds established a stone tavern on Nottingham Lot No. 17 to serve as a stage coach stop. According to local lore, he erected a sign over the entrance of the tavern depicting the rays of the sun at dawn and the words "The Rising Sun". As the tavern was located along the route between Baltimore and Philadelphia, it became known as a meeting place for business, politics, elections, and other public activities. Local legend states that the tavern was more well known than the surrounding village (Summer Hill) so that by the time the town's first post office was established around 1815, Rising Sun was chosen as the official name. There is some conjecture that the post office was located in the tavern.

When the town was incorporated in 1860, the commissioners had slate sidewalks installed, erected street lamps, and hired a lamplighter who doubled as bailiff and street maintenance man. Six years later the Philadelphia and Baltimore Central Railroad began to serve Rising Sun. Most of the town's current structure has been built since then.

In 1895, a 24-year-old Rising Sun Man, Sailor John A. Kay, enlisted in the Navy. When the Battleship Maine sailed for Havana Harbor in January 1898, Kay was an assistant machinist on this voyage. He and about 268 crew members perished when an explosion ripped through the vessel on February 15, 1898. On Independence Day 1900, a tall, handsome monument was dedicated at the Brookview Cemetery, which sits on a hilltop at the edge of town.

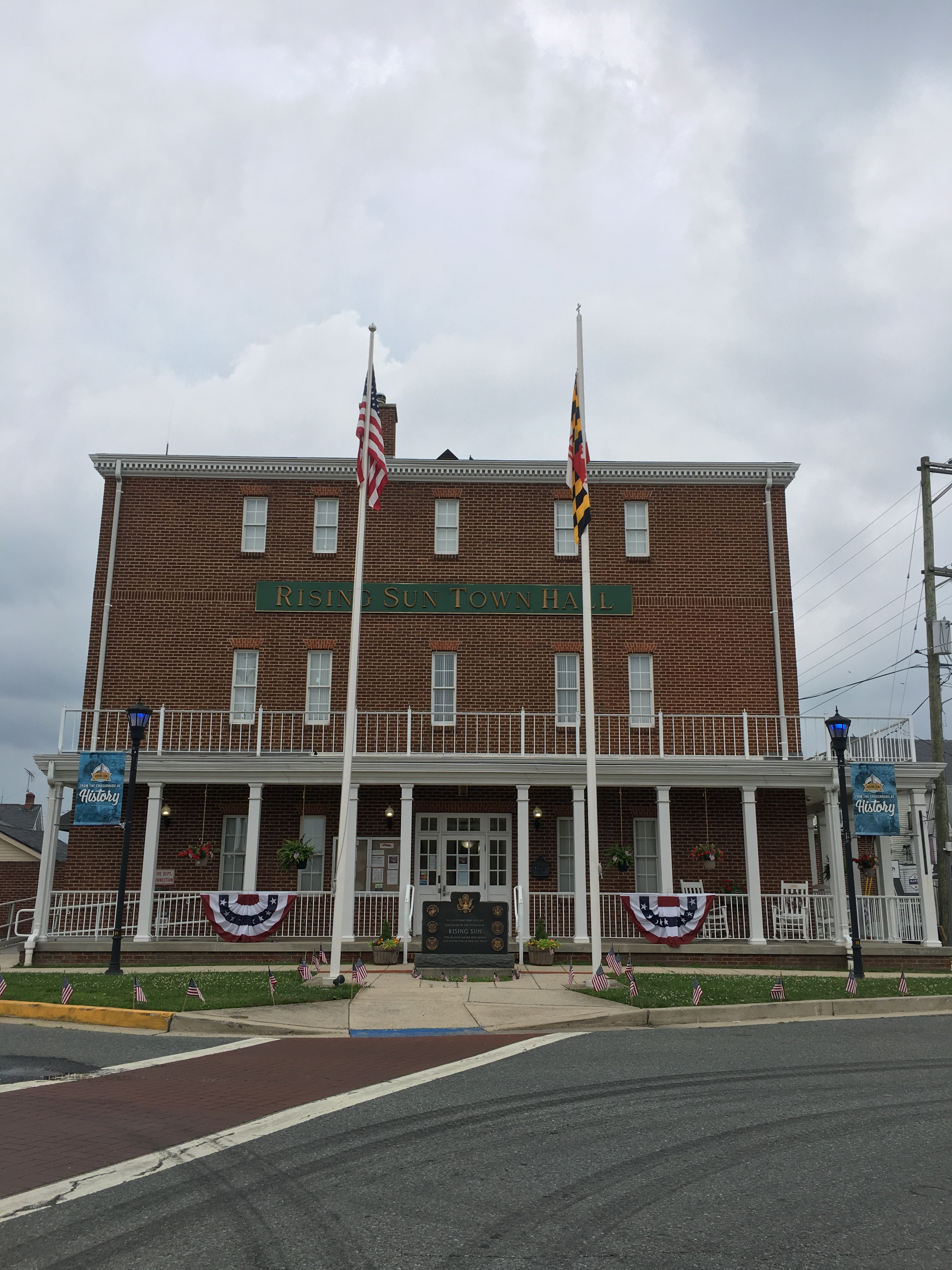
Rising Sun Town Hall (pictured in 2019)

In 1916 women voted in the Rising Sun municipal election for the first time. This was four years before the 19th Amendment to the Constitution passed, which provided voting privileges to women across the nation.

Listed on the National Register of Historic Places at Rising Sun are: the Jeremiah Brown House and Mill Site, East Nottingham Friends Meetinghouse, Joshua Lowe House, Thomas Richards House, and West Nottingham Meetinghouse.

== Geography ==
Rising Sun is located at 39°41′58″N 76°3′47″W (39.6994, -76.0630). According to the United States Census Bureau, the town has a total area of 1.27 square miles (3.29 km^{2}), of which 1.26 square miles (3.26 km^{2}) is land and 0.01 square miles (0.03 km^{2}) is water.

== Politics ==
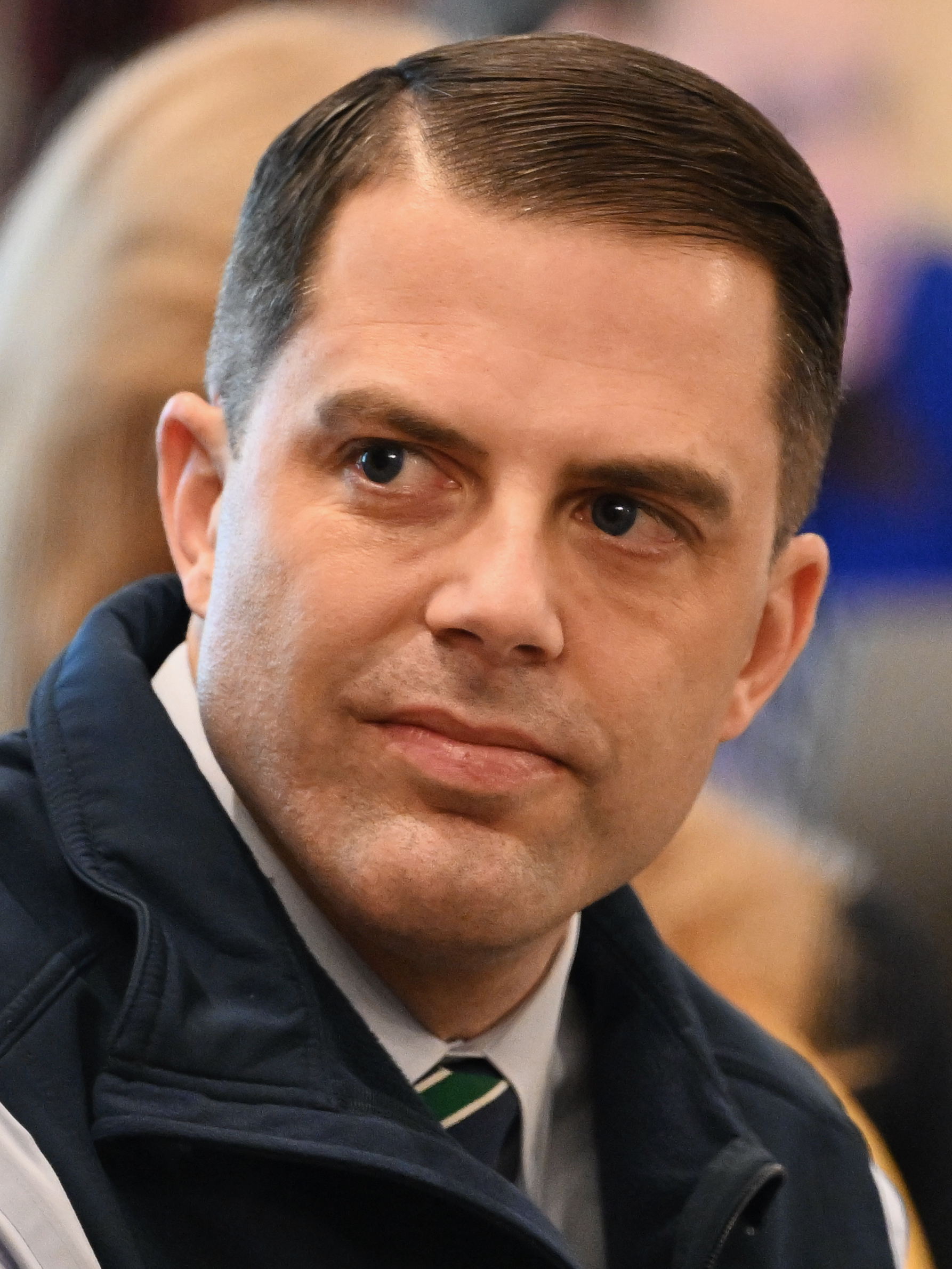
Incumbent mayor Travis Marion (pictured in 2025)

The current mayor is Travis Marion. The state senator for this area is Jason C. Gallion and the local delegates are Mike Griffith and Teresa E. Reilly. Rising Sun is a largely conservative town, having voted Republican in every election since 2000. Approximately 60% of the population is registered Republican.

== Transportation ==
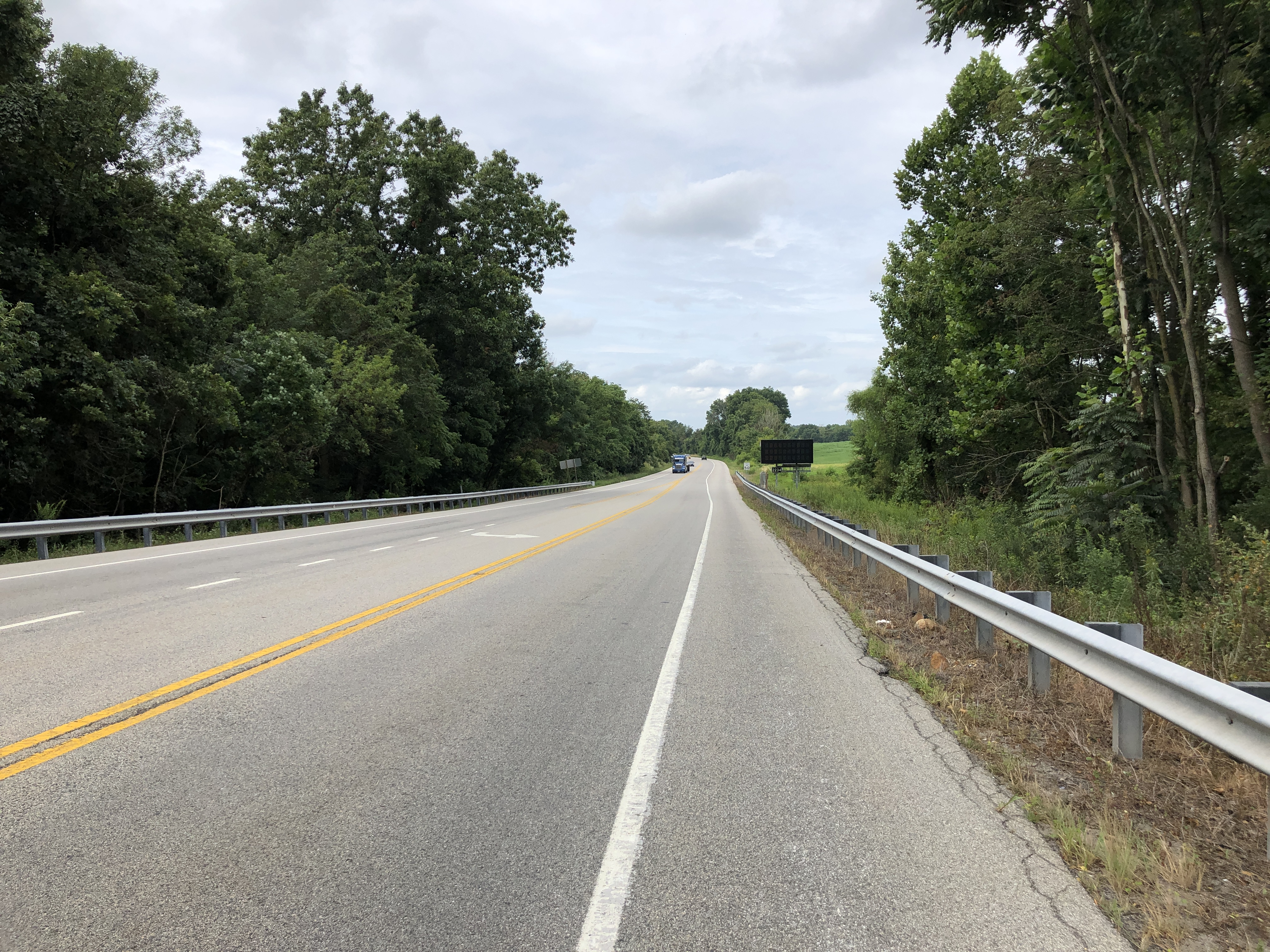
US 1 southbound in Rising Sun

Roads are the primary method of travel to and from Rising Sun. The most prominent highway serving Rising Sun directly is U.S. Route 1, which skims the northwest edge of town. Heading south, US 1 heads across the Conowingo Dam on its way towards Baltimore, while to the north, US 1 enters Pennsylvania on its journey towards Philadelphia. Other highways which pass through Rising Sun include Maryland Route 273 and Maryland Route 274. Maryland Route 276 passes just outside the town limits.

== Demographics ==
Historical population
Census	Pop.	Note	%±
1870	277		—
1880	314		13.4%
1890	384		22.3%
1900	382		−0.5%
1910	416		8.9%
1920	442		6.3%
1930	565		27.8%
1940	529		−6.4%
1950	668		26.3%
1960	824		23.4%
1970	956		16.0%
1980	1,160		21.3%
1990	1,263		8.9%
2000	1,702		34.8%
2010	2,781		63.4%
2020	2,740		−1.5%
U.S. Decennial Census

=== 2020 census ===
As of the 2020 census, Rising Sun had a population of 2,740. The median age was 36.9 years. 26.2% of residents were under the age of 18 and 14.1% of residents were 65 years of age or older. For every 100 females there were 91.3 males, and for every 100 females age 18 and over there were 88.7 males age 18 and over.

99.0% of residents lived in urban areas, while 1.0% lived in rural areas.

There were 1,072 households in Rising Sun, of which 38.9% had children under the age of 18 living in them. Of all households, 43.7% were married-couple households, 16.4% were households with a male householder and no spouse or partner present, and 32.1% were households with a female householder and no spouse or partner present. About 26.8% of all households were made up of individuals and 13.8% had someone living alone who was 65 years of age or older.

There were 1,120 housing units, of which 4.3% were vacant. The homeowner vacancy rate was 1.6% and the rental vacancy rate was 3.5%.

Racial composition as of the 2020 census
Race	Number	Percent
White	2,432	88.8%
Black or African American	29	1.1%
American Indian and Alaska Native	8	0.3%
Asian	17	0.6%
Native Hawaiian and Other Pacific Islander	0	0.0%
Some other race	59	2.2%
Two or more races	195	7.1%
Hispanic or Latino (of any race)	145	5.3%

=== 2010 census ===
As of the census of 2010, there were 2,781 people, 1,062 households, and 732 families living in the town. The population density was 2,207.1 inhabitants per square mile (852.2/km^{2}). There were 1,137 housing units at an average density of 902.4 per square mile (348.4/km^{2}). The racial makeup of the town was 95.8% White, 0.7% African American, 0.7% Native American, 0.6% Asian, 0.1% Pacific Islander, 0.6% from other races, and 1.4% from two or more races. Hispanic or Latino of any race were 2.6% of the population.

There were 1,062 households, of which 42.7% had children under the age of 18 living with them, 46.1% were married couples living together, 16.7% had a female householder with no husband present, 6.1% had a male householder with no wife present, and 31.1% were non-families. 27.2% of all households were made up of individuals, and 13.7% had someone living alone who was 65 years of age or older. The average household size was 2.62 and the average family size was 3.17.

The median age in the town was 32.5 years. 30.8% of residents were under the age of 18; 8.8% were between the ages of 18 and 24; 26.7% were from 25 to 44; 22.7% were from 45 to 64; and 11% were 65 years of age or older. The gender makeup of the town was 47.8% male and 52.2% female.

=== 2000 census ===
As of the census of 2000, there were 1,702 people, 681 households, and 456 families living in the town. The population density was 1,826.6 inhabitants per square mile (705.3/km^{2}). There were 716 housing units at an average density of 768.4 per square mile (296.7/km^{2}). The racial makeup of the town was 98.5% White, 0.7% African American, 0.1% Native American, 0.2% Asian, 0.1% Pacific Islander, 0.1% from other races, and 0.35% from two or more races. Hispanic or Latino of any race were 1.2% of the population.

There were 681 households, out of which 39.4% had children under the age of 18 living with them, 45.8% were married couples living together, 16.0% had a female householder with no husband present, and 33.0% were non-families. 28.5% of all households were made up of individuals, and 16.0% had someone living alone who was 65 years of age or older. The average household size was 2.50 and the average family size was 3.06.

In the town, the population was spread out, with 29.7% under the age of 18, 9.0% from 18 to 24, 30.8% from 25 to 44, 16.6% from 45 to 64, and 13.8% who were 65 years of age or older. The median age was 34 years. For every 100 females, there were 86.4 males. For every 100 females age 18 and over, there were 77.7 males.

The median income for a household in the town was $41,089, and the median income for a family was $48,646. Males had a median income of $36,765 versus $26,875 for females. The per capita income for the town was $17,835. About 9.3% of families and 9.8% of the population were below the poverty line, including 10.3% of those under age 18 and 9.4% of those age 65 or over.
