= Jake Taylor (politician) =

American politician

Member-elect of the Maryland House of Delegates from the 34B district
- Assuming office January 13, 2027
- Succeeding: Susan McComas

Personal details
- Born: 2002 or 2003 (age 22–23) Harford County, Maryland, U.S.
- Party: Republican
- Education: Loyola University Maryland (BA)

Jakob D. Taylor (born 2002 or 2003) is an American politician who is a member-elect of the Maryland House of Delegates from District 34B. A member of the Republican Party, he has served as a town commissioner of Bel Air, Maryland, since 2023.

== Early life and education ==
Taylor was born in Harford County, Maryland, in 2002 or 2003. He grew up near Bel Air, Maryland, moving into the town as a high school freshman. Taylor graduated from Loyola Blakefield, afterwards attending Loyola University Maryland, where he earned a Bachelor of Arts degree in political science in 2024.

== Political career ==
=== Early political career ===
Taylor first got involved in politics when he was twelve years old, after approaching state delegate Christian Miele at a town hall to ask about redistricting reform. While in middle and high school, he studied U.S. presidents, conflicts, types of governments and philosophies, and the writings of Founding Fathers. While attending Loyola University, he worked as a legislative aide for state senator Jason C. Gallion, the fist vice chair of the Maryland Federation of College Republicans, and as the campaign manager of Miele's 2022 Maryland Senate campaign. Taylor later served as the parliamentarian of the Maryland Republican Party. After graduating, he worked for a small, family-run financial services and retirement investment firm.

At the age of 19, he launched a campaign for the Bel Air town commission, winning one of three seats in the November 2023 election with 29.6 percent of the vote. Sworn in at 20 years old, he is the youngest person to hold office in Harford County history. During his tenure, Taylor opposed the state government's plan to move the Harford County District Court and supported legislation to preserve open space in Bel Air.

=== Maryland House of Delegates ===
Taylor ran for the Maryland House of Delegates in 2026, challenging Susan McComas, who later withdrew from the race. During the Republican primary, he was backed by the Maryland Freedom Caucus. Taylor won the Republican primary on June 23, 2026, with 51.8% of the vote, and defeated Democratic nominee Anthony Lyon in the general election. Taylor will be sworn in on January 13, 2027, and will be a member of the Government, Labor, and Elections Committee.

== Political positions ==
During his 2026 House of Delegates campaign, Taylor criticized what he called state overreach in local communities, saying that the Maryland General Assembly was "increas[ing] financial burdens on local governments while stripping them of responsibility and authority over their own backyards". He also supported efforts to lower state spending and cut regulations, and criticized efforts to expand renewable energy in Maryland as well as Governor Wes Moore's efforts to invest in the state's biotechnology and quantum computing industries.

== Electoral history ==
Bel Air town commission election, 2023
| Candidate | Votes | % |
|---|---|---|
| Steven T. Chizmar | 1,011 | 31.8 |
| Jakob D. Taylor | 940 | 29.6 |
| James B. Rutledge III | 938 | 29.5 |
| Erin S. Hughes (incumbent) | 288 | 9.1 |
| Total votes | 3,177 | 100.0 |
