= Senator Norman =

Senator Norman may refer to:

- Fred B. Norman (1882–1947), Washington State Senate
- H. Wayne Norman Jr. (1955–2018), Maryland State Senate
- Jim Norman (politician) (born 1953), Florida State Senate
- Linda Norman (politician) (fl. 2010s), Maryland State Senate
