= Cassilly =

Cassilly is a surname. Notable people with the surname include:

- Andrew Cassilly (born 1965), American politician from Maryland
- Bob Cassilly (1949–2011), American sculptor
- Richard Cassilly (1927–1998), American operatic tenor
- Robert Cassilly (politician) (born 1958), American politician from Maryland
