= Ethel Ann Murray =

American politician (1932–2020)

Member of the Maryland House of Delegates from the 35B district
- In office 1983–1994
- Preceded by: district established
- Succeeded by: David D. Rudolph

Personal details
- Born: Ethel Ann Murray; August 11, 1932 New York City, U.S.
- Died: July 14, 2020 (aged 87)
- Party: Democratic
- Spouse: John W. Murray Jr. (m. 1953)

Ethel Ann Murray (August 11, 1932 – July 14, 2020) was an American politician. She was a member of the Maryland House of Delegates, representing District 35B from 1983 to 1994.

== Early life ==
Ethel Ann Murray was born on August 11, 1932, in The Bronx, New York City, to Helen and William Murray. She attended Catherine McAuley Academy in Brooklyn. She also attended the University of Maryland, Loyola College and Cecil Community College.

== Career ==
Murray served as a member of the Maryland House of Delegates, representing District 35B from 1983 to 1994. She was elected as a Democrat. She ran again in 1994, but lost the election to David D. Rudolph.

== Personal life ==
Murray married John W. Murray Jr. of Elkton, Maryland, on January 17, 1953.

Murray died at home on July 14, 2020, at the age of 87.
