= Thomas Richards House =

Historic house in Maryland, United States

- U.S. National Register of Historic Places
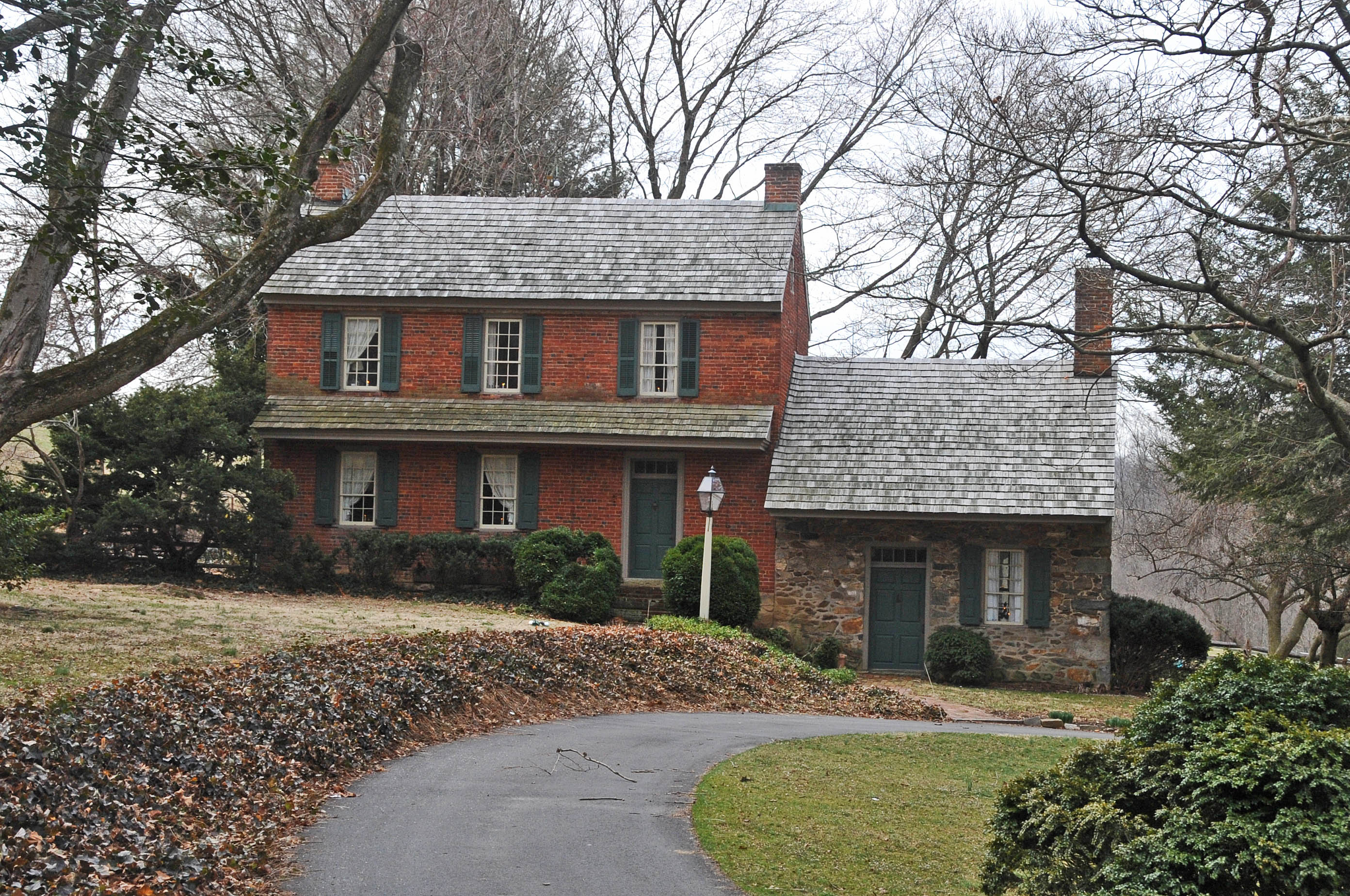

- Location within Maryland Location within the United States
- Location: Conowingo Road (US 1), Rising Sun, Maryland
- Coordinates: 39°41′34″N 76°6′41″W
- Area: 4.2 acres (1.7 ha)
- NRHP reference No.: 79001122
- Added to NRHP: December 19, 1979

The Thomas Richards House is a historic home located at Rising Sun, Cecil County, Maryland, United States. It is a stone and brick farmhouse; the 1 1/2-story kitchen section of fieldstone construction dating from the late 18th century, and the main block of brick construction, dating from the early 19th century. Also on the property is a large stone and wood three-level bank barn.

The Thomas Richards House was listed on the National Register of Historic Places in 1979.

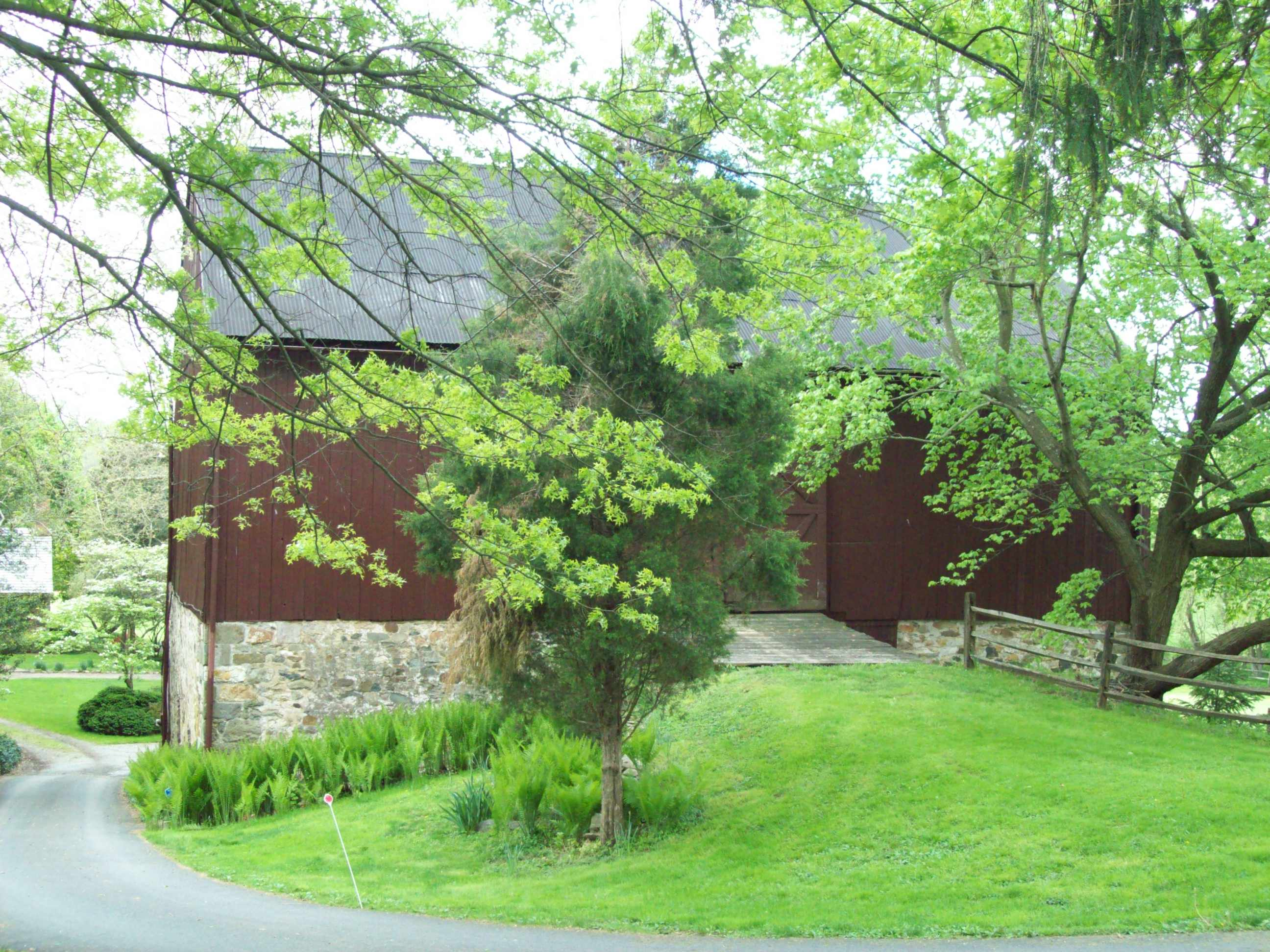
Bank barn, April 2010
