= Linda Norman (politician) =

American politician

Linda S. Norman
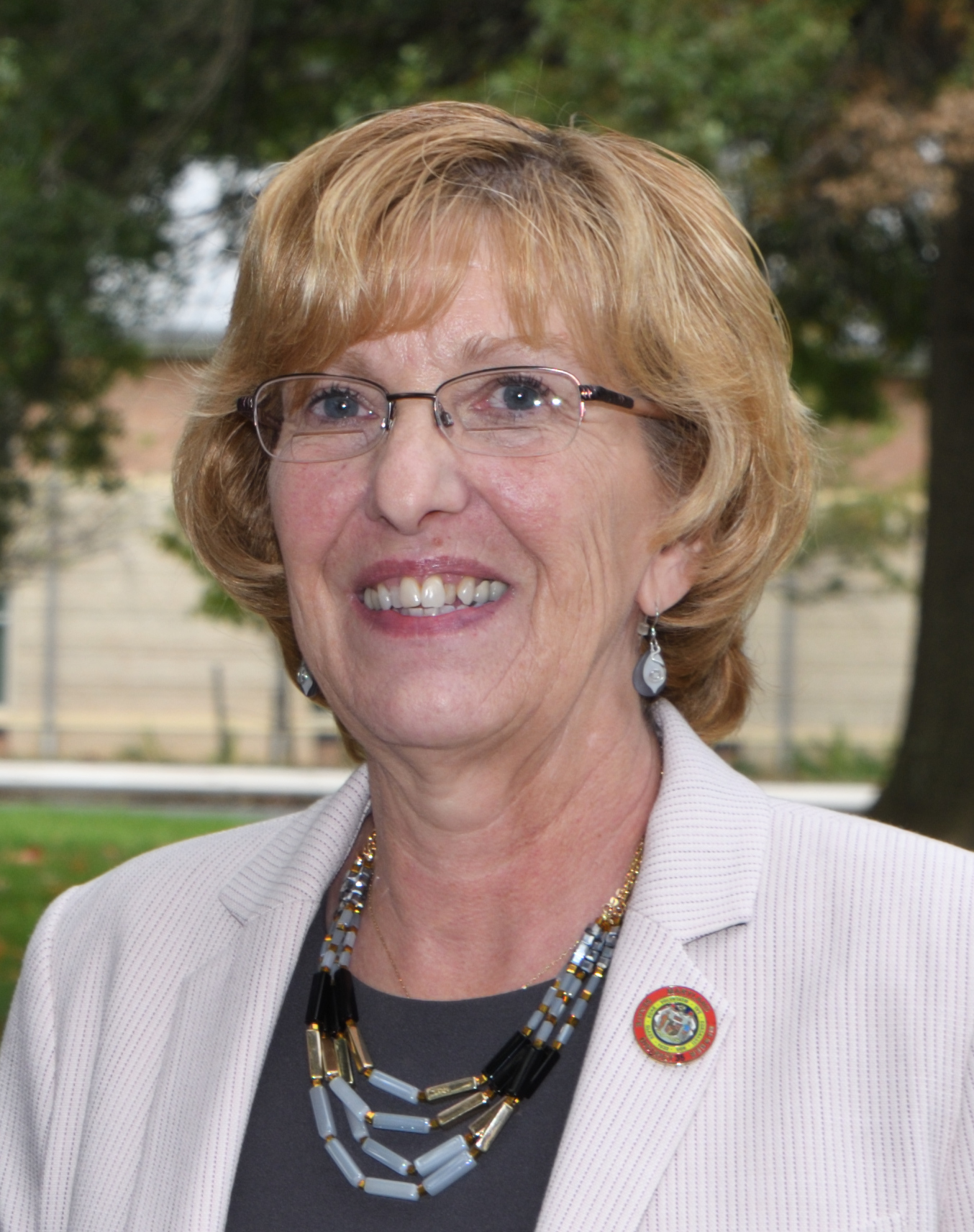

Member of the Maryland Senate from the 35th district
- In office March 16, 2018 – January 9, 2019
- Preceded by: H. Wayne Norman Jr.
- Succeeded by: Jason C. Gallion

Personal details
- Party: Republican
- Spouse: H. Wayne Norman Jr.
- Children: 2

Linda S. Norman is an American politician.

Norman was an office manager at a law firm in Bel Air, Maryland, from 1993 to 2018. She took office as a Republican member of the Maryland Senate on March 16, 2018, weeks after her husband H. Wayne Norman Jr. died, and served out the rest of his term, through January 9, 2019.
