= West Nottingham Meetinghouse =

Historic church in Maryland, United States

- U.S. National Register of Historic Places
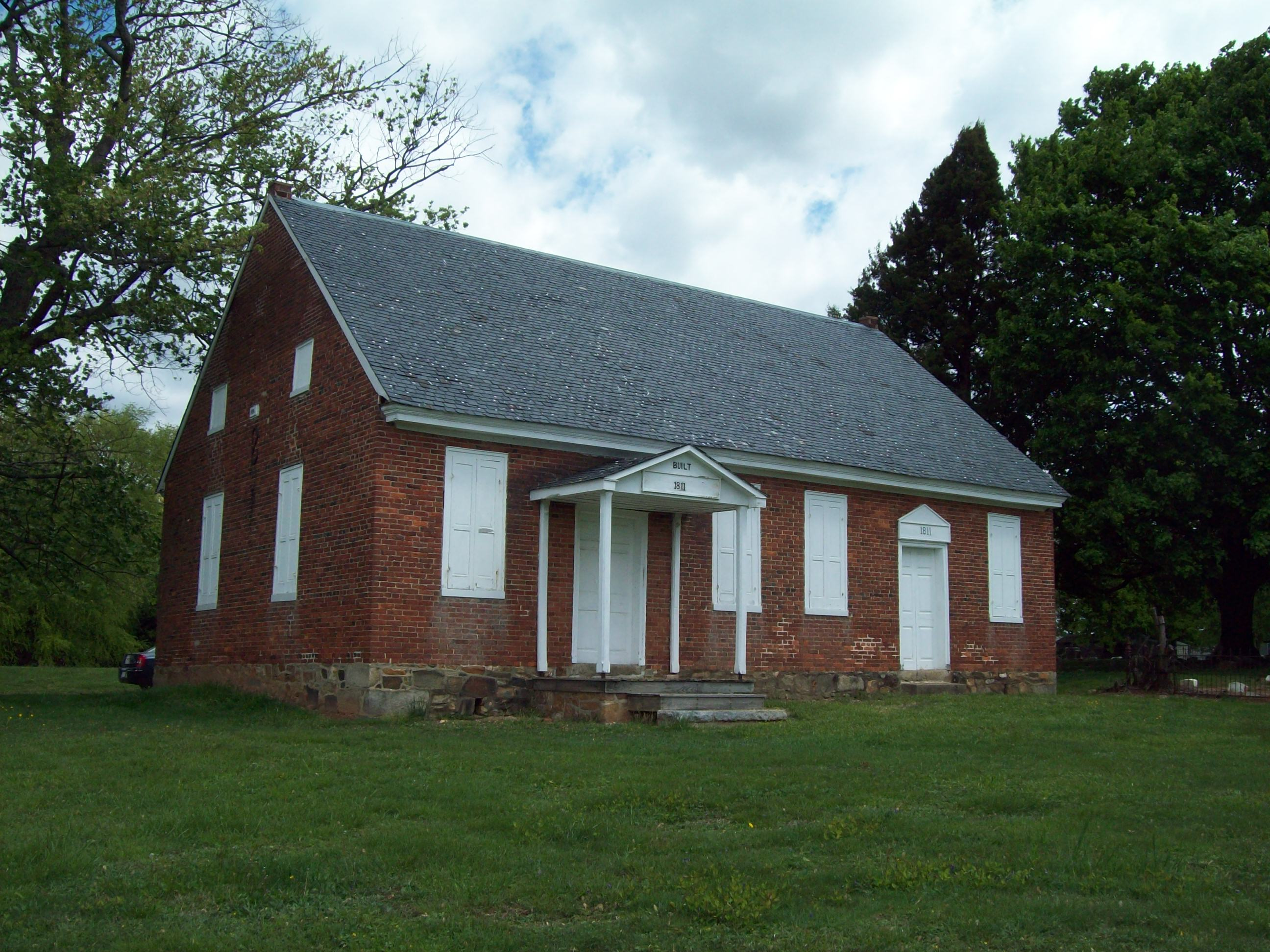
- West Nottingham Meetinghouse, April 2010

- Location within Maryland Location within the United States
- Location: Harrisville Road (Old MD 268), Rising Sun, Maryland
- Coordinates: 39°41′12″N 76°4′46″W
- Area: 2.7 acres (1.1 ha)
- Built: 1811
- NRHP reference No.: 76000988
- Added to NRHP: November 7, 1976

The West Nottingham Meetinghouse, or Little Brick Meetinghouse, is a historic Friends meeting house located at Rising Sun, Cecil County, Maryland, United States. It is a brick one-story building built in 1811, rectangularly shaped, and measuring 45 feet, 4 inches by 30 feet. Also on the property is a graveyard. The structure features two entrances, one for women and one for men, and sliding panels to divide the interior space in half, as well as the raised "Elder's Benches."

The West Nottingham Meetinghouse was listed on the National Register of Historic Places in 1976.
