= Maryland House of Delegates District 35B =

American legislative district

Maryland's legislative district 35B
- Represents part of Cecil County
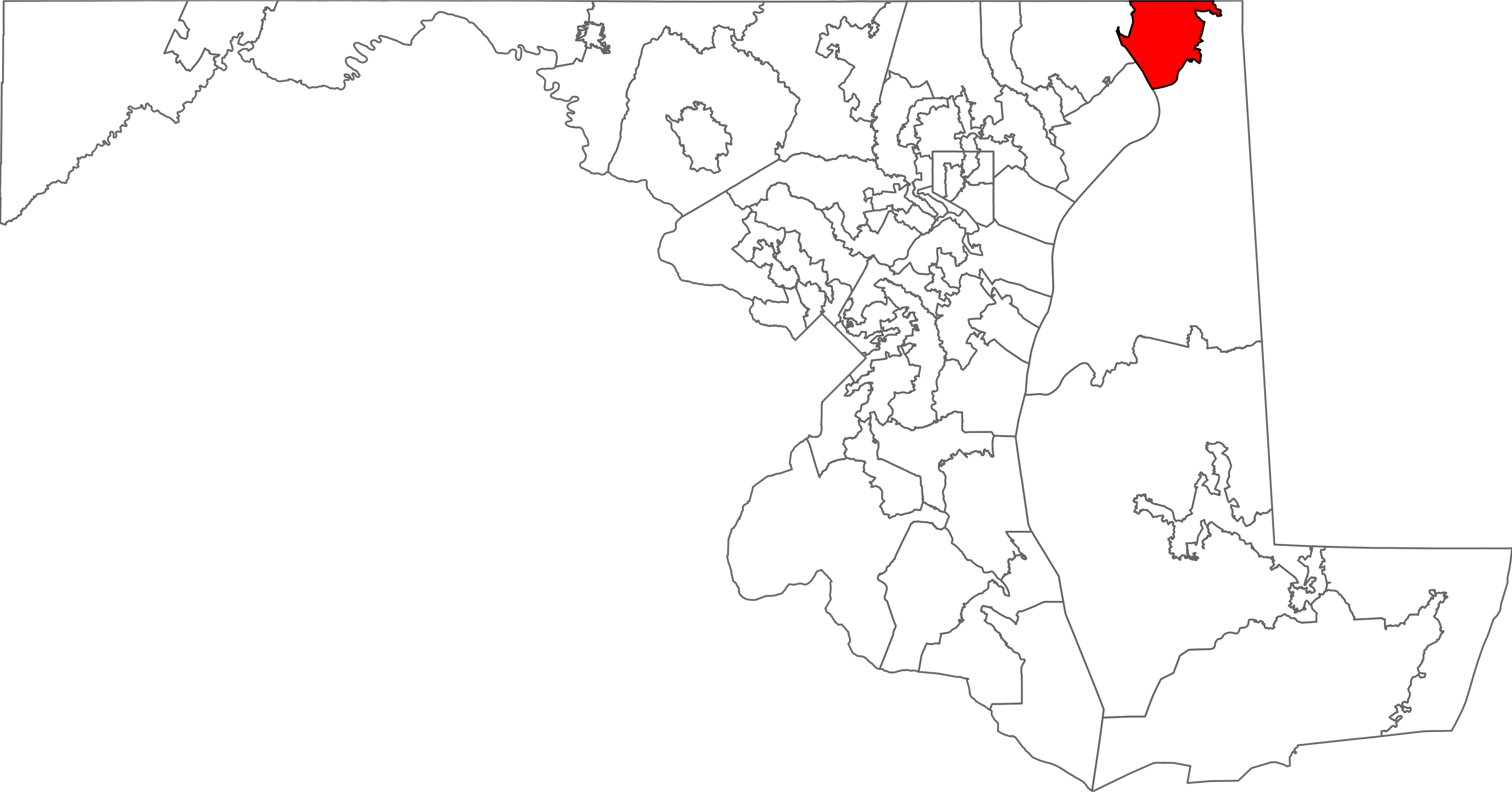
- Delegate(s): Kevin Hornberger (R)
- Registration: 52.4% Republican; 26.0% Democratic; 20.1% unaffiliated
- Demographics: 86.9% White; 3.5% Black/African American; 0.2% Native American; 2.3% Asian; 0.0% Hawaiian/Pacific Islander; 1.1% Other race; 5.9% Two or more races; 3.3% Hispanic
- Population (2020): 87,260
- Voting-age population: 67,801
- Registered voters: 64,272

Maryland House of Delegates District 35B is one of the 71 districts that compose the Maryland House of Delegates. Along with subdistrict 35A, it makes up the 35th district of the Maryland Senate. District 35B includes parts of Cecil County, and is represented by one delegate.

== History ==
The constituency of District 35B was parts of Cecil County and Harford County and was represented by two delegates up until the 2020 United States redistricting cycle when its constituency changed to part of Cecil County and was reduced to a single delegate.

== Demographic characteristics ==
As of the 2020 United States census, the district had a population of 87,260, of whom 67,801 (77.7%) were of voting age. The racial makeup of the district was 75,810 (86.9%) White, 3,087 (3.5%) African American, 174 (0.2%) Native American, 2,024 (2.3%) Asian, 24 (0.0%) Pacific Islander, 970 (1.1%) from some other race, and 5,158 (5.9%) from two or more races. Hispanic or Latino individuals of any race were 2,922 (3.3%) of the population.

The district had 64,272 registered voters as of October 17, 2020, of whom 12,909 (20.1%) were registered as unaffiliated, 33,710 (52.4%) were registered as Republicans, 16,714 (26.0%) were registered as Democrats, and 501 (0.8%) were registered to other parties.

== Past Election Results ==
=== 1986 ===
Name	Party	Votes	Percent	Outcome
Ethel Ann Murray	Democratic	3,846	59.0%	Won
Walter Burlin	Republican	2,726	41.0%	Lost

=== 1990 ===
Name	Party	Votes	Percent	Outcome
Ethel Ann Murray	Democratic	4,692	100.0%	Won

=== 1994 ===
Name	Party	Votes	Percent	Outcome
David D. Rudolph	Democratic	4,175	51.0%	Won
Robert H. Ward	Republican	2,450	30.0%	Lost
Ethel Ann Murray	Democratic	1,610	20.0%	Lost

=== 1998 ===
Name	Party	Votes	Percent	Outcome
David D. Rudolph	Democratic	6,333	65.0%	Won
Robert H. Ward	Republican	3,433	35.0%	Lost

=== 2002 ===
Name	Party	Votes	Percent	Outcome
Susan K. McComas	Republican	10,273	61.4%	Won
David E. Carey	Democratic	6,444	38.5%	Lost
Other Write-Ins		12	0.1%	

=== 2006 ===
Name	Party	Votes	Percent	Outcome
Susan K. McComas	Republican	10,922	62.5%	Won
David E. Carey	Democratic	6,536	37.4%	Lost
Other Write-Ins		9	0.1%	

=== 2010 ===
Name	Party	Votes	Percent	Outcome
Susan K. McComas	Republican	12,817	72.3%	Won
John Janowich	Democratic	4,884	27.6%	Lost
Other Write-Ins		24	0.1%	

=== 2014 ===
Name	Party	Votes	Percent	Outcome
Andrew Cassilly	Republican	23,556	42.8%	Won
Teresa E. Reilly	Republican	21,006	38.1%	Won
Jeffrey Elliott	Democratic	5,952	10.8%	Lost
Daniel Lewis Lamey	Democratic	4,495	8.2%	Lost
Other Write-Ins		72	0.1%	

=== 2018 ===
Name	Party	Votes	Percent	Outcome
Andrew Cassilly	Republican	26,494	48.6%	Won
Teresa E. Reilly	Republican	18,107	33.2%	Won
Ronnie Teitler Davis	Democratic	9,834	18.0%	Lost
Other Write-Ins		128	0.2%	
