= David D. Rudolph =

American politician

David Rudolph
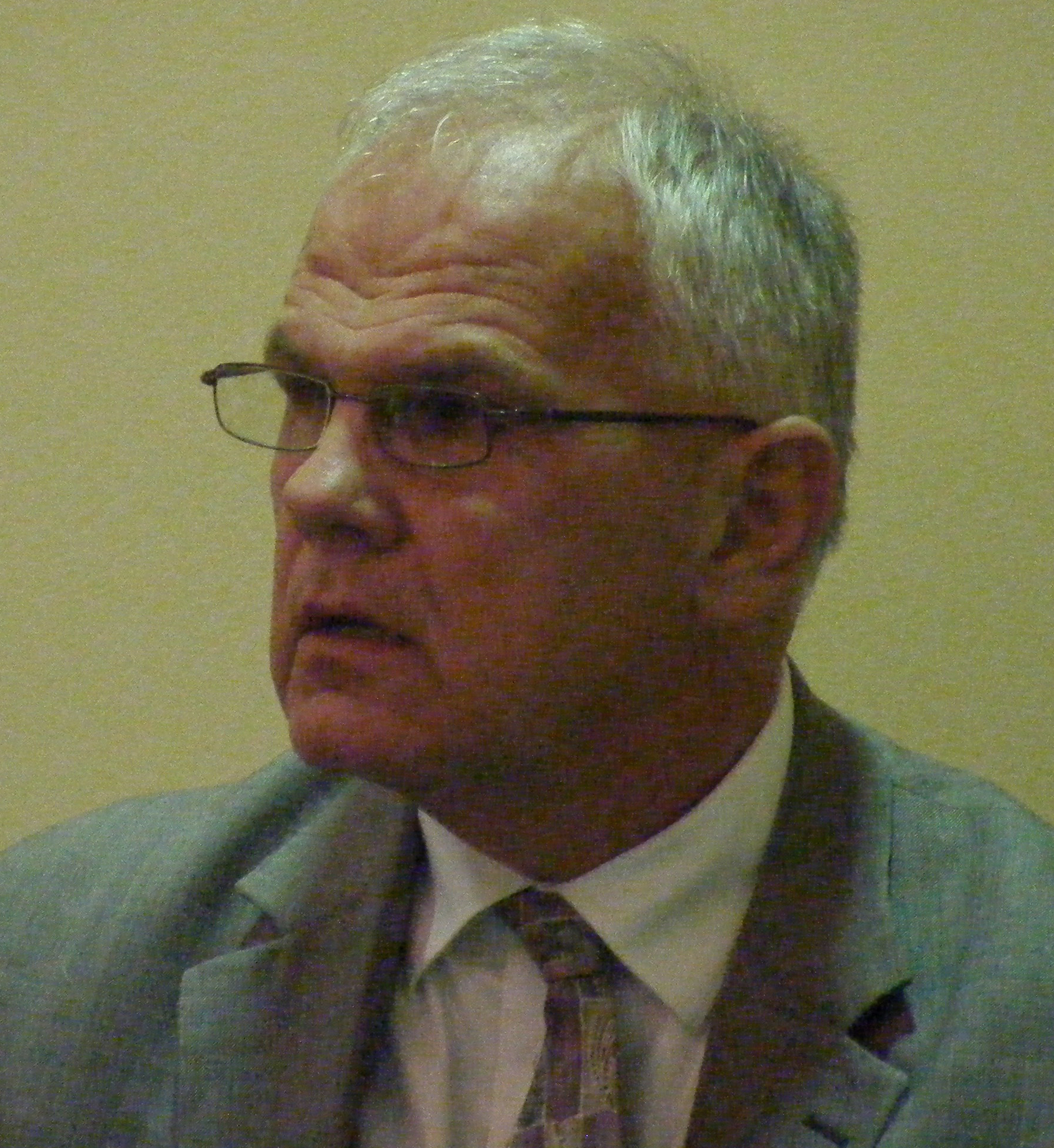

Member of the Maryland House of Delegates from the 34B district
- In office 2003 – January 14, 2015
- Preceded by: district established
- Succeeded by: Susan K. McComas

Member of the Maryland House of Delegates from the 35B district
- In office January 11, 1995 – 2002
- Preceded by: Ethel Ann Murray
- Succeeded by: Susan K. McComas

Personal details
- Born: June 12, 1949 (age 77) Summit, New Jersey, U.S.
- Party: Democratic
- Spouse: Diana
- Children: 3
- Education: Wilmington University (B.A., Ed.D); University of Delaware (M.Ed.)

David D. Rudolph (born June 12, 1949) is an American politician from Maryland and a member of the Democratic Party. He was a member of the Maryland House of Delegates, representing Maryland's District 35B from 1995 to 2002 and District 34B from 2003 to 2015.

== Early life ==
David D. Rudolph was born on June 12, 1949, in Summit, New Jersey. He was raised in Cecil County, Maryland and graduated from North East High School in 1967. He graduated with a Bachelor of Arts in history/political science from Wilmington University in 1971. Rudolph graduated with a Master of Education from the University of Delaware in 1977. He graduated with a Doctor of Education from Wilmington University in 1998.

== Career ==
In 1973, Rudolph started his teaching career with Cecil County Public Schools. and taught at Perryville High School for 4 years. In 1977, he was promoted to the school's Assistant Principal. He also spent 2 years as Assistant Principal at Elkton High School. In 1988, he was promoted to Principal at Perryville Middle School. He was also Principal of the Providence School from 1994 to 1997, and of North East Middle School from 1997 to 2000. Along with his duties as a State Delegate, David also serves as Director of the Teacher Education Program at Cecil College.

=== Political career ===
Rudolph was elected as a member of the Maryland House of Delegates in 1994. He started by representing District 35B from January 11, 1995 to 2002. He then represented District 34B from 2003 to January 14, 2015.

House Chair, Joint Committee on Base Realignment and Closure, 2007-. Vice-Chair, Economic Matters Committee, 2007- (chair, property & casualty insurance subcommittee, 2007-; member, banking, economic development, science & technology subcommittee, 2007-; unemployment insurance subcommittee, 2007-; workers' compensation subcommittee, 2007-). Member, Rules and Executive Nominations Committee, 2007-. Member, Commerce and Government Matters Committee, 1995-98 (ethics & elections subcommittee); Ways and Means Committee, 1999-2003 (finance resources subcommittee, 1999–2000; children & youth subcommittee, 2001–03); Health and Government Operations Committee, 2003-06 (health insurance subcommittee, 2003–04; public health subcommittee, 2004–05; public health & long-term care subcommittee, 2005–06; chair, health occupations subcommittee, 2003–04; chair, pharmaceuticals subcommittee, 2004–06); Joint Audit Committee, 1999–2002; Special Committee on Higher Education Affordability and Accessibility, 2003–04; Joint Committee on the State's Emergency Medical Response System, 2003-05. Chair, Cecil County Delegation, 1995-2002. Member, Maryland Rural Caucus, 2002-; Maryland Legislative Sportsmen's Caucus, 2005-; Maryland Veterans Caucus, 2005-. Member, Task Force on School Leaders, National Conference of State Legislatures, 2002; National Legislative Association on Prescription Drug Prices, 2005-. Member, Governor's Executive Advisory Council, 1991; Commission to Save the Lighthouses, 1995–96; Bainbridge Re-Use Advisory Committee, 1996–97; Task Force to Study the Preservation and Enhancement of Maryland's Heritage Resources, 1998-2001 (protection & preservation committee); Governor's Task Force on Eastern Shore Economic Development, 1999–2001; Maryland Task Force on the Principalship, State Department of Education, 1999–2001; Bainbridge Development Advisory Board, 1999-; Task Force to Study College Readiness for Disadvantaged and Capable Students, 2000–01; Tri-County Council for the Lower Eastern Shore of Maryland, 2001-; Maryland K-16 Partnership for Teaching and Learning Work Group, 2003-; Upper Shore Regional Council, 2003-; Task Force on the Establishment of a Prescription Drug Repository Program, 2005–06; Social Studies Task Force, 2005-; Task Force to Convene a Summit on Civic Literacy in Maryland, 2006; Cecil/Harford Bridges Work Group, 2006. Co-Chair, Task Force on the Availability and Affordability of Property Insurance in Coastal Areas, 2007-08. Member, Climate Change Commission, 2007-. Co-Chair, Commission to Study the Title Insurance Industry in Maryland, 2008-.

=== Legislative notes ===
- voted for the Maryland Gang Prosecution Act of 2007 (HB713), subjecting gang members to up to 20 years in prison and/or a fine of up to $100,000
- voted for Jessica’s Law (HB 930), eliminating parole for the most violent child sexual predators and creating a mandatory minimum sentence of 25 years in state prison, 2007
- voted for Public Safety – Statewide DNA Database System – Crimes of Violence and Burglary – Post conviction (HB 370), helping to give police officers and prosecutors greater resources to solve crimes and eliminating a backlog of 24,000 unanalyzed DNA samples, leading to 192 arrests, 2008
- voted for Vehicle Laws – Repeated Drunk and Drugged Driving Offenses – Suspension of License (HB 293), strengthening Maryland’s drunk driving laws by imposing a mandatory one year license suspension for a person convicted of drunk driving more than once in five years, 2009
- voted for HB 102, creating the House Emergency Medical Services System Workgroup, leading to Maryland’s budgeting of $52 million to fund three new Medevac helicopters to replace the State’s aging fleet, 2009

For the past four years, Delegate Rudolph has annually voted to support classroom teachers, public schools, police and hospitals in Cecil County. Since 2002, funding to schools across the State has increased 82%, resulting in Maryland being ranked top in the nation for K-12 education.

== Personal life ==
Rudolph is married to Diana. They have three children.
