= Joshua Lowe House =

Historic house in Maryland, United States

- U.S. National Register of Historic Places
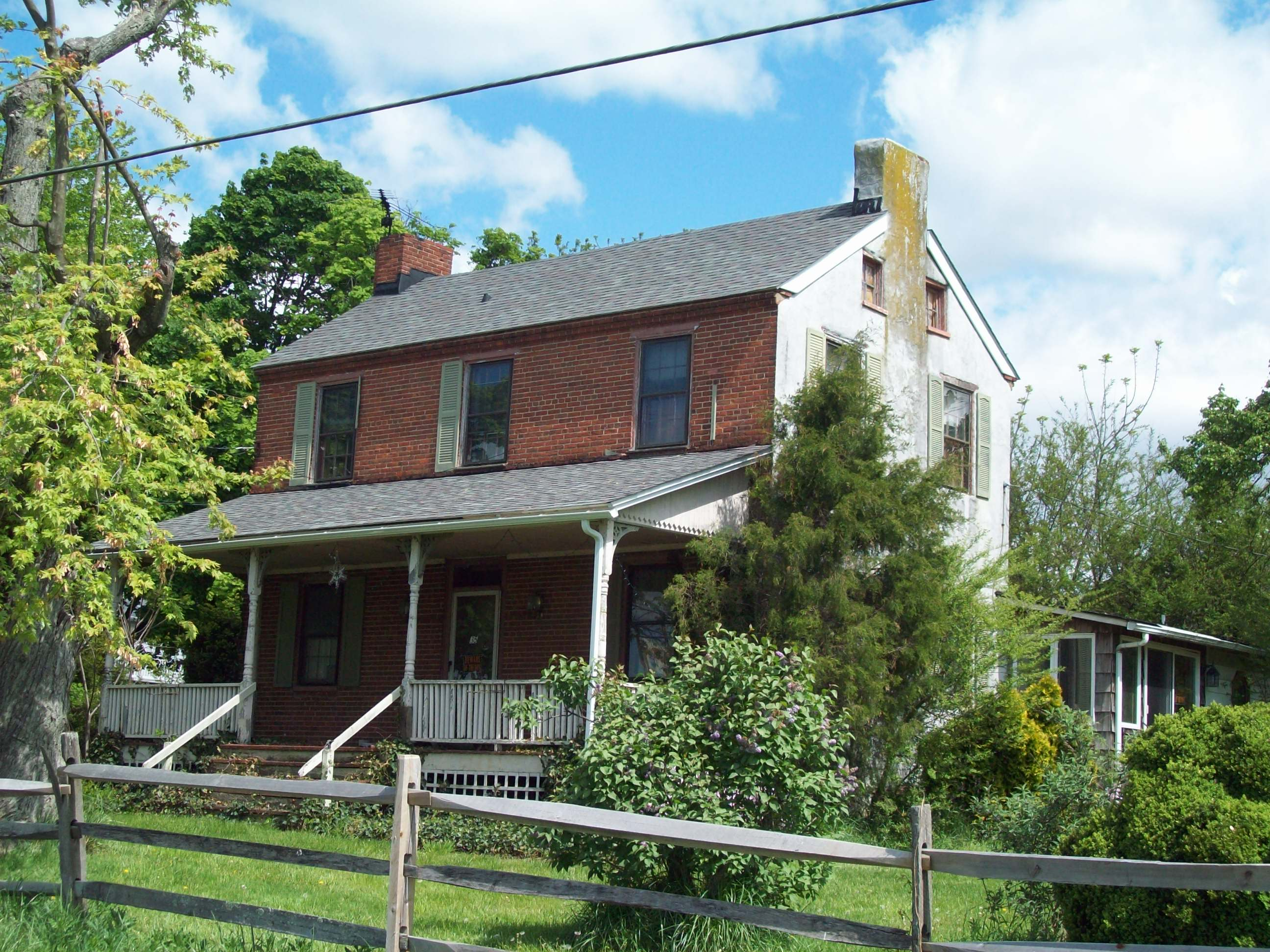
- Joshua Lowe House, April 2010

- Location within Maryland Location within the United States
- Location: 35 New Bridge Road & Old Mill Road, Rising Sun, Maryland
- Coordinates: 39°42′54″N 76°9′29″W
- Area: less than one acre
- Built: 1830
- Architectural style: Federal
- NRHP reference No.: 01000337
- Added to NRHP: April 5, 2001

The Joshua Lowe House is a historic home located at Rising Sun, Cecil County, Maryland, United States. It is a two-story, center passage plan brick building three bays wide by two bays deep, built about 1830 in the late Federal. The house is one of the earliest and most substantial buildings in the crossroads village of Rock Springs and served as the first post office for the community from 1830 to 1838.

The Joshua Lowe House was listed on the National Register of Historic Places in 2001.
