= Andrew Cassilly =

American politician

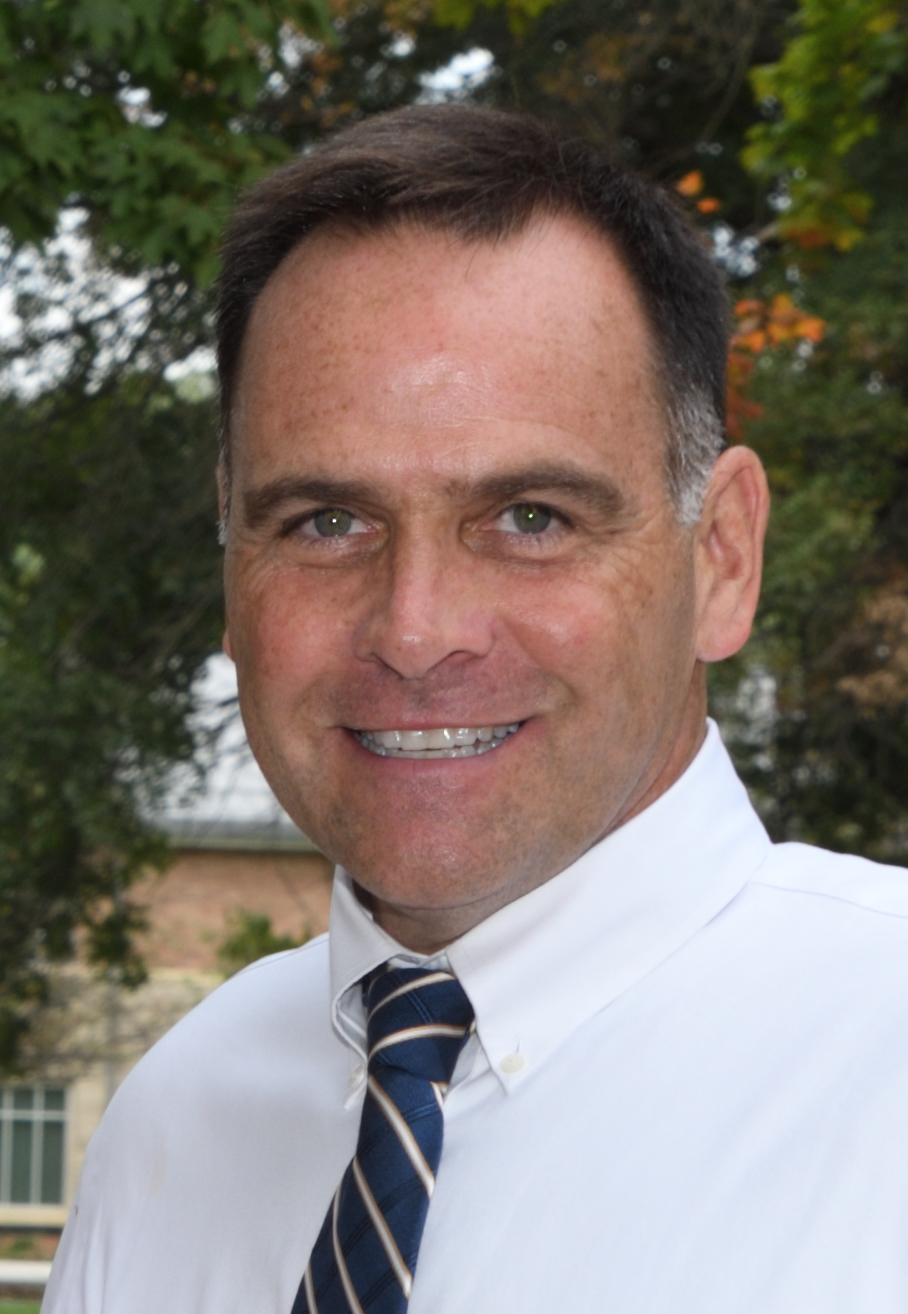

Senior Advisor, Governor's Legislative Office
- In office December 12, 2019 – January 18, 2023
- Preceded by: Keiffer Mitchell Jr. (D)

Member of the Maryland House of Delegates from the 35B district
- In office January 14, 2015 – December 11, 2019 Serving with Teresa E. Reilly (R)
- Preceded by: Susan K. McComas
- Succeeded by: Mike Griffith (R)

Personal details
- Born: Andrew P. Cassilly; August 1965 (age 60–61)
- Party: Republican
- Spouse: Married
- Children: Three children
- Education: Bel Air High School, Bel Air, Maryland
- Alma mater: Millersville University of Pennsylvania, B.S. (education), 1989; Loyola College, Baltimore, M.S. (administrative management), 2000

Military service
- Branch/service: Maryland Army National Guard
- Years of service: 1984-1989
- Unit: 175th Infantry Regiment

Andrew Cassilly (born August 1965) is a senior advisor to Maryland governor Larry Hogan in the Governor's Legislative Office. Cassilly is a Republican who represented district 35B in the Maryland House of Delegates from 2015 to 2019 when he resigned to work for Hogan. He is the brother of state senator Robert Cassilly and former Harford County State's Attorney Joseph Cassilly.

== Maryland Legislature ==
Cassilly was elected to the Maryland House of Delegates in 2014, and sworn in on January 14, 2015. He succeeded Susan McComas, who would instead run in District 34B in 2014. He was re-elected in 2018.

In February 2019, Cassilly worked with delegate David Fraser-Hidalgo to introduce a bill that would authorize the state to regulate commercial hemp farming according to the Hemp Farming Act of 2018. The bill passed the House of Delegates and the state Senate by votes of 137-0 and 45-0, respectively, and was signed by Governor Hogan in April. He was also a sponsor of House Bill 401, which would allow the use of rifles for harvesting deer in Harford County under the Deer Management Permits. HB 401 would pass the House of Delegates and the state Senate in a 140-0 and 47-0 vote, respectively.

In February 2019, following lobbying from Maryland bicyclists, Cassilly worked with delegate Jay Jalisi to introduce House Bill 398, a "safe passing" bill that would allow motorists to cross a double-yellow line in order to safely pass a bicycle. The bill would pass the House of Delegates by a vote of 140-0, but would not receive a vote in the state Senate.

In December 2020, Governor Hogan appointed Cassilly to serve as his senior advisor, replacing Keiffer Mitchell Jr., a Democrat who he had recently appointed to the role of Chief Legislative Officer. Hogan would appoint Mike Griffith to replace him in the House of Delegates on December 30, 2019.

== Electoral history ==
Maryland House of Delegates District 35B Republican Primary Election, 2014
Party	Candidate	Votes	%
Republican	Andrew Cassilly	3,866	34
Republican	Teresa Reilly	3,782	34
Republican	Jason Gallion	3,634	32

Maryland House of Delegates District 35B General Election, 2014
Party	Candidate	Votes	%
Republican	Andrew Cassilly	23,556	43
Republican	Teresa Reilly	21,006	38
Democratic	Jeffrey Elliott	5,952	11
Democratic	Daniel Lewis Lamey	4,495	8
Other/Write-in	Other/Write-in	72	0

Maryland House of Delegates District 35B Republican Primary Election, 2018
Party	Candidate	Votes	%
Republican	Andrew Cassilly	6,063	52
Republican	Teresa Reilly	5,573	48

Maryland House of Delegates District 35B General Election, 2018
Party	Candidate	Votes	%
Republican	Andrew Cassilly	26,494	49
Republican	Teresa Reilly	18,107	33
Democratic	Ronnie Teitler Davis	9,834	18
Other/Write-in	Other/Write-in	128	0
