= Mike Griffith (politician) =

American politician (born 1977/1978)

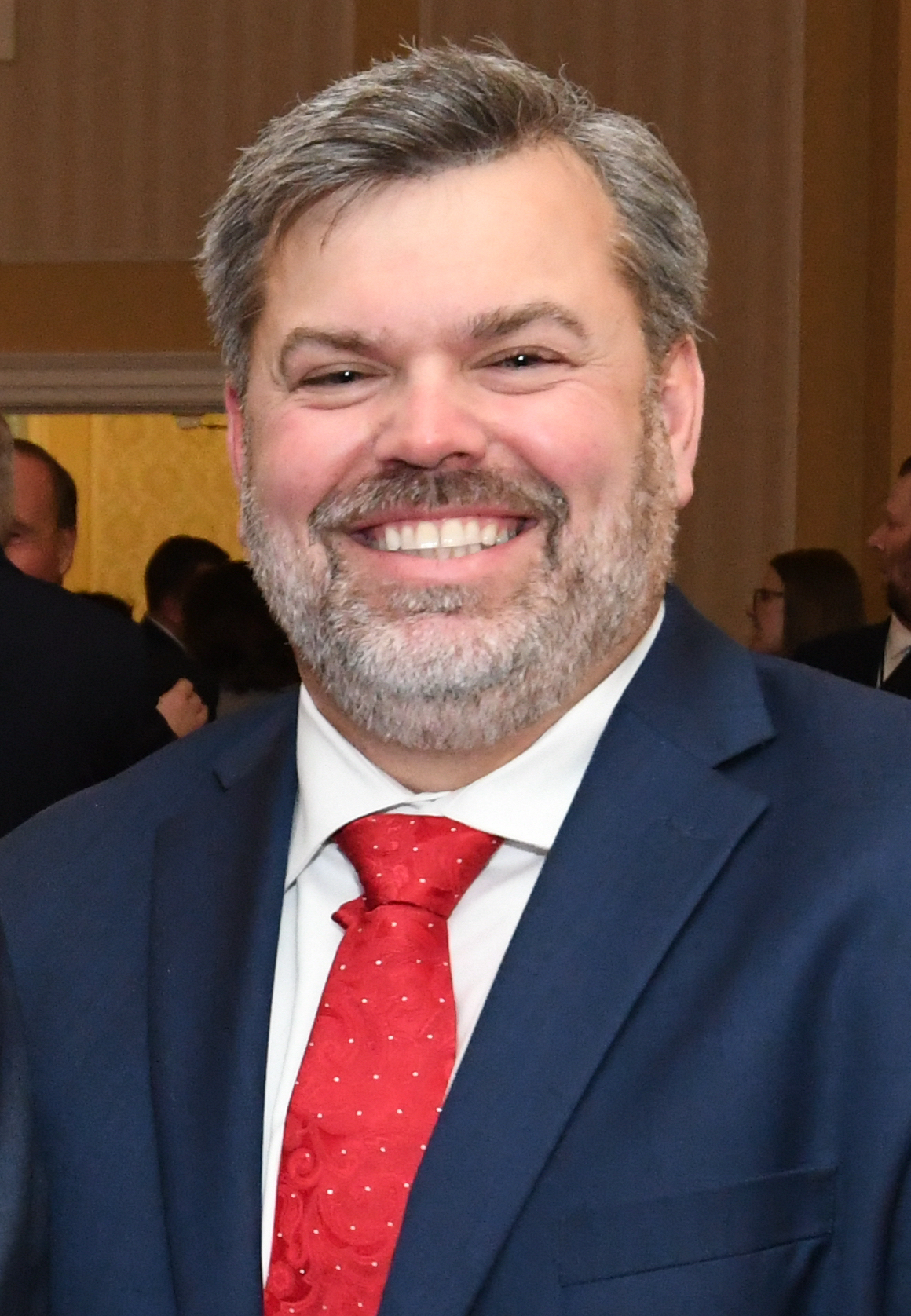
- Griffith in 2020

Member of the Maryland House of Delegates
- Incumbent
- Assumed office January 7, 2020 Serving with Teresa E. Reilly
- Appointed by: Larry Hogan
- Preceded by: Andrew Cassilly
- Constituency: District 35B (2020–2023); District 35A (2023–present)

Personal details
- Born: Christopher Michael Griffith; 1977 or 1978 (age 47–48) Baltimore, Maryland, U.S.
- Party: Republican

Military service
- Allegiance: United States
- Branch/service: United States Marine Corps
- Years of service: 1995–2002

Christopher Michael Griffith (born 1977 or 1978) is an American politician who has served as a Republican member of the Maryland House of Delegates, representing District 35A, since January 7, 2020. He previously represented District 35B from 2020 to 2023. Griffith was appointed by Governor Larry Hogan after Andrew Cassilly resigned the seat to become a senior advisor to Hogan.

== Early life and career ==
Griffith was born in Baltimore, Maryland, in 1977 or 1978. He graduated from Joppatowne High School in Joppa, Maryland. Griffith was in Maryland's foster care system from age 12 to 18. In 1995, at age 17, he joined the U.S. Marine Corps, serving as a military police officer, supervisor, and liaison until 2002. Afterwards, Griffith served on various community boards, including the Maryland Building Industry Association, the Harford County Economic Development Advisory Board, and the Arc Northern Chesapeake Region. Griffith entered into politics in 2018 by becoming a member of the Harford County Republican Central Committee. Griffith was elected the chair of the committee in 2019.

== In the legislature ==
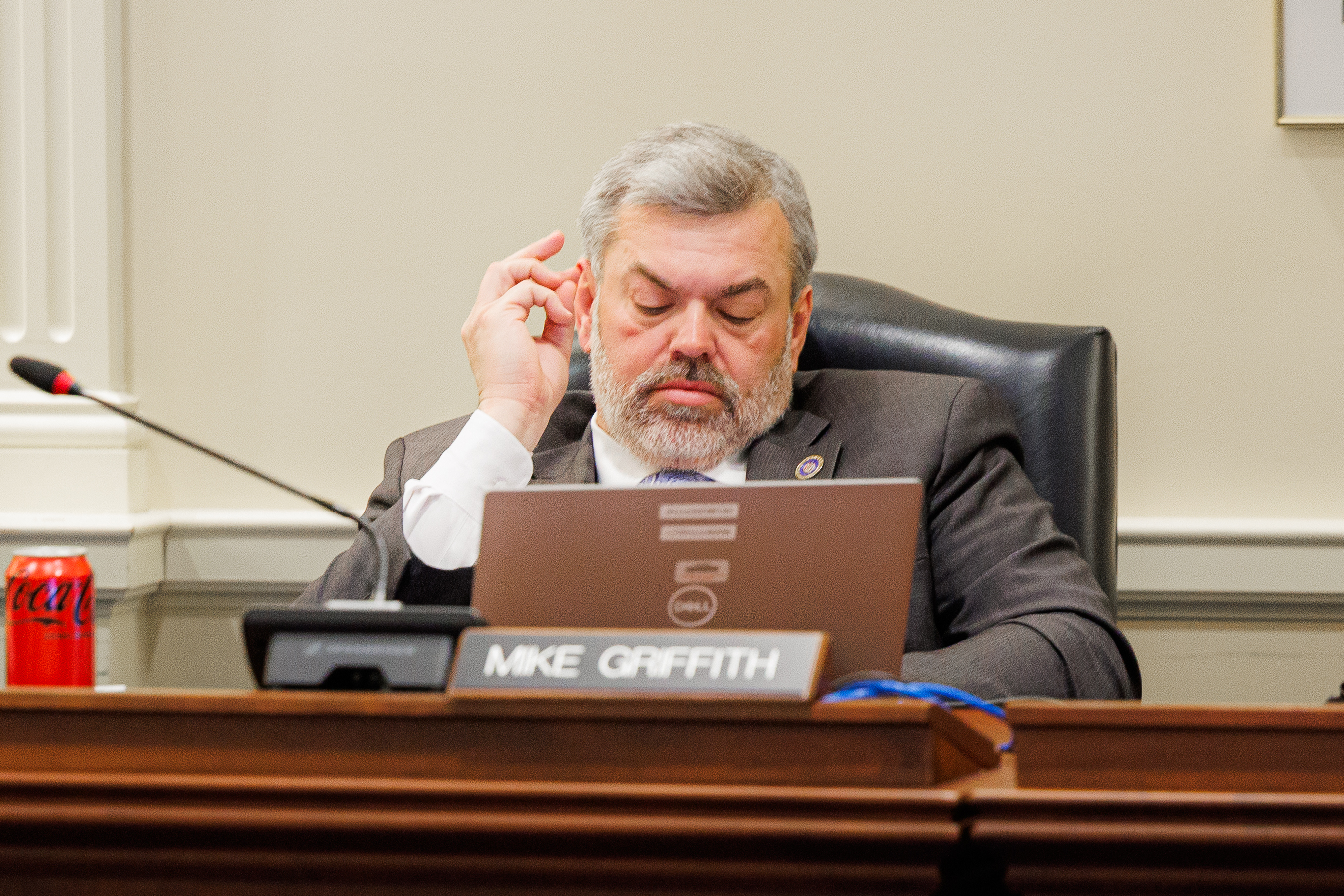
Griffith in the Ways and Means Committee, 2024

In January 2020, Governor Larry Hogan appointed Griffith to the Maryland House of Delegates to succeed Andrew Cassilly, who resigned to become a senior advisor in the governor's legislative office. Griffith was sworn into the Maryland House of Delegates on January 7, 2020. He was a member of the Judiciary Committee from 2020 to 2021, afterwards serving on the Ways and Means Committee since 2021. Griffith is also a member of the Maryland Veterans Caucus.

== Political positions ==
=== Crime and policing ===
In April 2021, during a vote on a bill that would order police departments to provide body-worn cameras for on-duty officers, Griffith introduced an amendment that would require the state of Maryland to pay for the mandated body cameras. He later expressed concern that the bill would slow down officers' decision-making during dangerous situations and cost their lives.

During the 2026 legislative session, Griffith introduced a bill that would expand the list of offenses for which a student can be arrested and would require law enforcement to notify the school and superintendent following arrest.

=== Education ===
Griffith is an advocate for in-person learning, having supported students and parents in Harford County that pushed for schools to reopen amid the COVID-19 pandemic. In August 2020, Griffith signed a letter calling on the Harford County Board of Education to give parents the choice as to whether they want their child to return to school or to learn remotely, and giving teachers the same option.

During the 2021 legislative session, Griffith introduced two bills aimed at increasing aid to students with special needs. The first bill, the Education Equality for All Act, would require school systems to give parents the information and funding necessary to update their child's individual education program; the bill passed and was signed into law by Governor Larry Hogan on May 18, 2021. The second bill, the Vulnerable Student Protection Act, would require schools to provide special education, behavioral health, counseling, and nutritional services on an in-person basis to at-risk students; the bill received a hearing in committee, but did not receive a vote. In February 2021, Griffith voted against an amendment that would create a fully elected seven member school board in Harford County, Maryland.

In August 2025, Griffith called for the scaling back of the Blueprint for Maryland's Future to avoid raising taxes to continue supporting the state's SNAP-Ed program, which provides increased food access to low-income students and families. As of August 2025, the Maryland SNAP-Ed program is set to shut down following cuts to the Supplemental Nutrition Assistance Program under the One Big Beautiful Bill Act.

=== Immigration ===
During the 2026 legislative session, Griffith opposed a bill that would prohibit counties from entering into 287(g) program agreements with U.S. Immigration and Customs Enforcement, claiming that the program led to the conviction of Victor Martinez Hernandez in the murder of Rachel Morin. He also opposed a bill that would prohibit private immigration detention facilities without a specific zoning allowance for that purpose.

=== Redistricting ===
In January 2026, during debate on a bill to redraw Maryland's congressional districts, Griffith introduced an amendment to replace the state's congressional districts with the redistricting plan proposed by the Maryland Citizens Redistricting Commission under Governor Larry Hogan. The amendment was rejected in a 37–95 vote.

=== Social issues ===
During the 2026 legislative session, Griffith introduced Kanayiah's Law, which would create an ombudsman position for child welfare in the Office of the Attorney General of Maryland. The bill was named for Kanayiah Ward, a 16-year-old who died in a Baltimore hotel while in state custody in fall 2025.

=== Taxes ===
In 2020, Griffith attended a rally against a proposed measure that would extend Maryland's sales tax to several professional services, including lawyers, hairdressers, home and auto repair companies, and real estate agents.

During a vote on an education reform bill in the 2021 legislative session, Griffith introduced an amendment that would limit tax increases for education funding.

=== Voting rights ===
During the 2021 legislative session, Griffith introduced a bill that would allow active-duty military members to electronically register to vote and request an absentee ballot and make public colleges and universities produce plans to encourage students to vote. The bill passed and became law on May 30, 2021. In August 2026, during debate on a proposed constitutional amendment on redistricting, Griffith introduced an amendment that would require voters to sign their mail-in ballots before it could be accepted by a local election board.
