= Maryland House of Delegates District 34B =

American legislative district

Maryland's legislative district 34B
- Represents part of Harford County
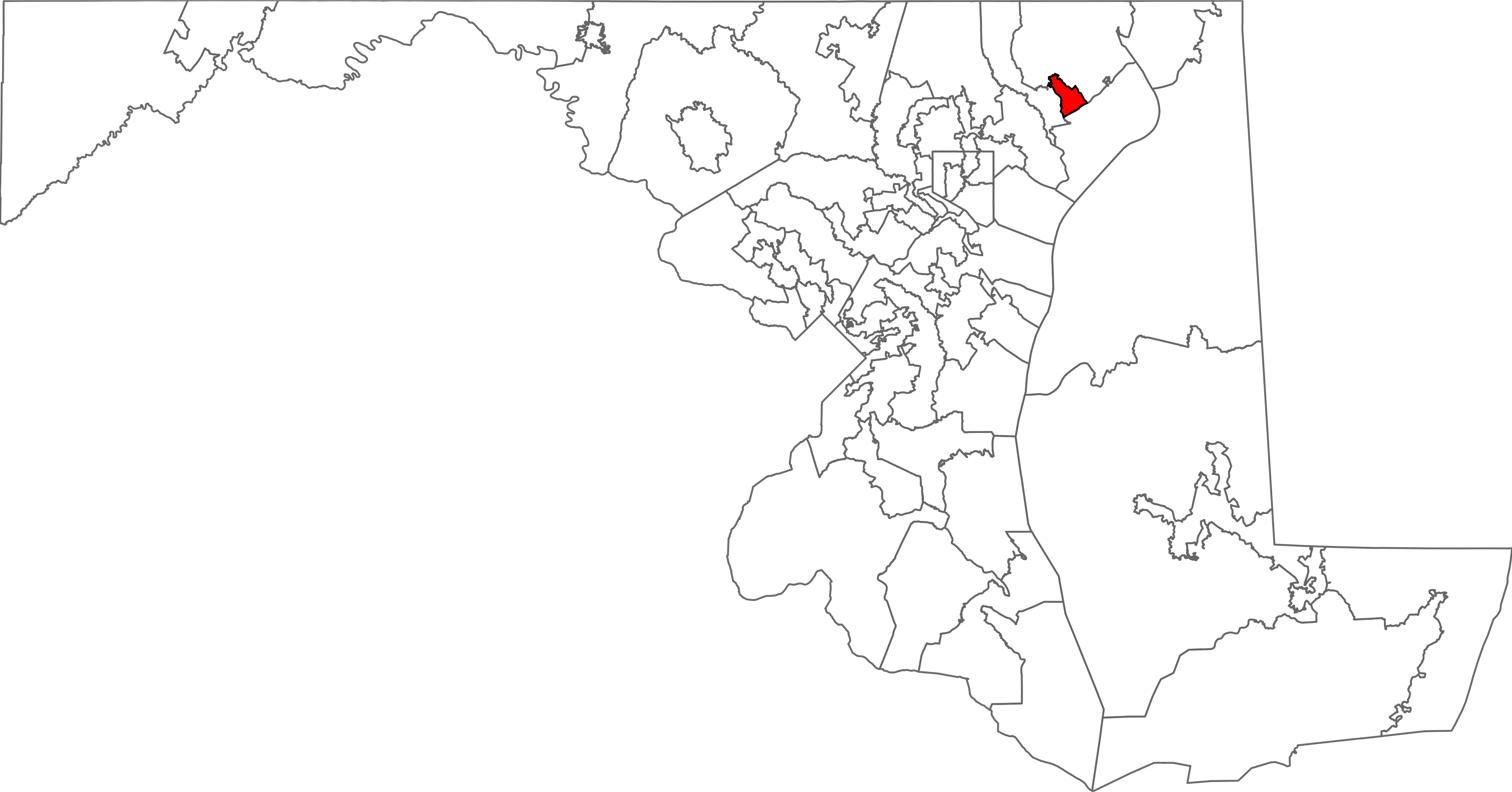
- Delegate(s): Susan K. McComas (R)
- Registration: 43.4% Republican; 34.1% Democratic; 21.0% unaffiliated
- Demographics: 78.0% White; 8.4% Black/African American; 0.2% Native American; 4.4% Asian; 0.0% Hawaiian/Pacific Islander; 2.0% Other race; 7.0% Two or more races; 5.4% Hispanic
- Population (2020): 44,265
- Voting-age population: 34,400
- Registered voters: 32,003

Maryland House of Delegates District 34B is one of the 71 districts that compose the Maryland House of Delegates. Along with subdistrict 34A, it makes up the 34th district of the Maryland Senate. District 34B includes part of Harford County, and is represented by one delegate.

== Demographic characteristics ==
As of the 2020 United States census, the district had a population of 44,265, of whom 34,400 (77.7%) were of voting age. The racial makeup of the district was 34,543 (78.0%) White, 3,718 (8.4%) African American, 81 (0.2%) Native American, 1,939 (4.4%) Asian, 22 (0.0%) Pacific Islander, 866 (2.0%) from some other race, and 3,101 (7.0%) from two or more races. Hispanic or Latino of any race were 2,388 (5.4%) of the population.

The district had 32,003 registered voters as of October 17, 2020, of whom 6,736 (21.0%) were registered as unaffiliated, 13,888 (43.4%) were registered as Republicans, 10,909 (34.1%) were registered as Democrats, and 247 (0.8%) were registered to other parties.

== Past Election Results ==
=== 2002 ===
Name	Party	Votes	Percent	Outcome
David D. Rudolph	Democratic	6,762	56.3%	Won
William W. Herold Jr.	Republican	5,239	43.6%	Lost
Other Write-Ins		6	0.1%	

=== 2006 ===
Name	Party	Votes	Percent	Outcome
David D. Rudolph	Democratic	7,716	55.0%	Won
Ewing McDowell	Republican	6,301	44.9%	Lost
Other Write-Ins		6	0.0%	

=== 2010 ===
Name	Party	Votes	Percent	Outcome
David D. Rudolph	Democratic	7,097	48.7%	Won
Theodore A. Patterson	Republican	6,700	46.0%	Lost
Michael W. Dawson	Constitution	773	5.3%	Lost
Other Write-Ins		3	0.0%	

=== 2014 ===
Name	Party	Votes	Percent	Outcome
Susan K. McComas	Republican	11,801	72.7%	Won
Cassandra R. Beverley	Democratic	4,419	27.2%	Lost
Other Write-Ins		20	0.1%	

=== 2018 ===
Name	Party	Votes	Percent	Outcome
Susan K. McComas	Republican	12,533	65.0%	Won
Jeff Dinger	Democratic	6,706	34.8%	Lost
Other Write-Ins		57	0.3%	
