= Jason C. Gallion =

American politician (born 1977)

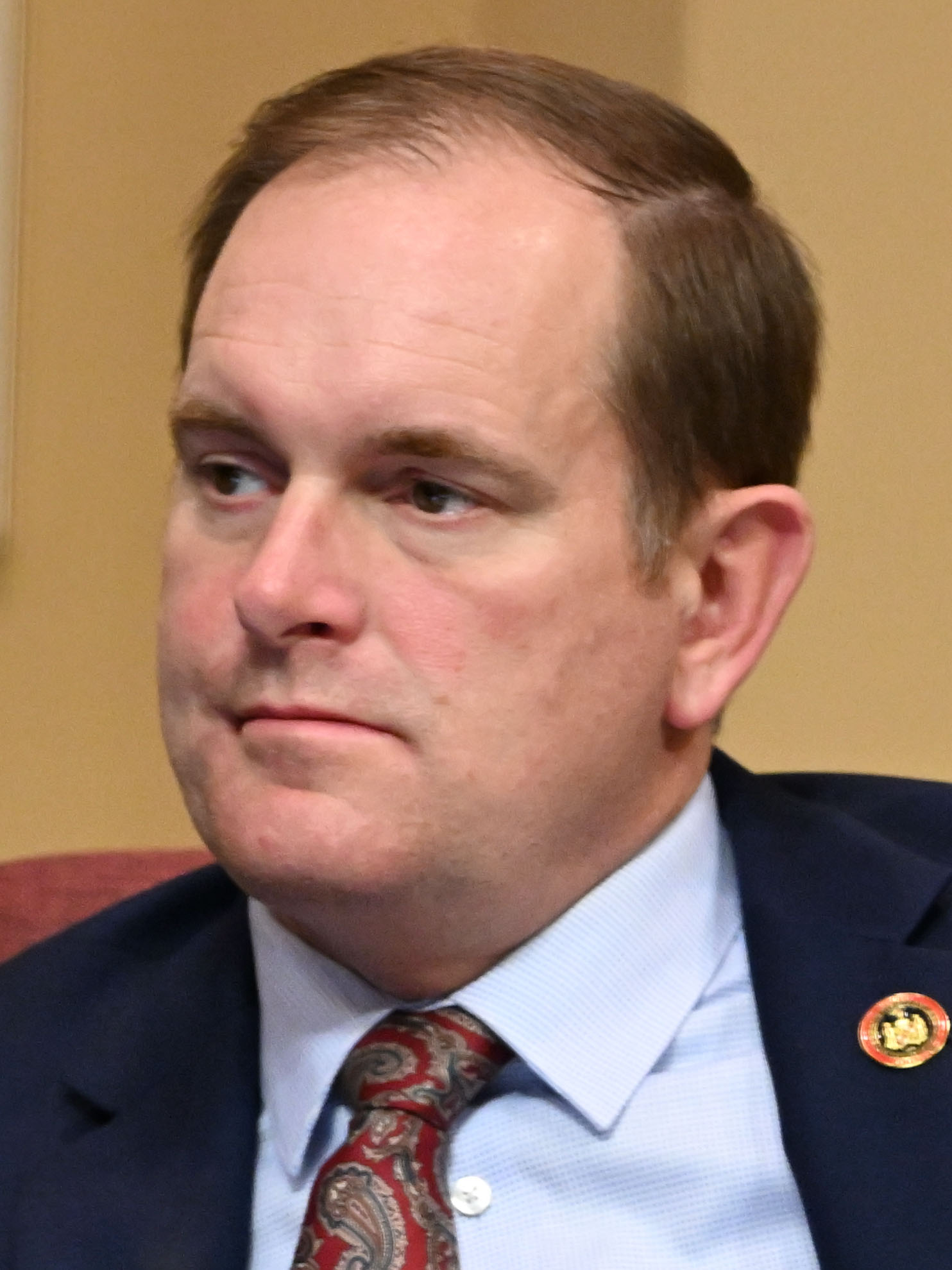
- Gallion in 2025

Member of the Maryland Senate from the 35th district
- Incumbent
- Assumed office January 9, 2019
- Preceded by: Linda Norman

Personal details
- Born: Jason Charles Gallion; February 10, 1977 (age 49) Havre de Grace, Maryland, U.S.
- Party: Republican
- Children: 4
- Education: Havre de Grace High School
- Alma mater: Harford Community College (A.A)
- Occupation: Farmer

Jason Charles Gallion (born February 10, 1977) is an American politician who serves as a Republican member of the Maryland Senate from the 35th district in Cecil County and Harford County.

== Early life and career ==
Gallion was born in Havre de Grace, Maryland on February 10, 1977, where he graduated from Havre de Grace High School in 1995. He grew up helping his father, who worked for the State Highway Administration, raise beef cattle at home. He also worked as a teen at the dairy farms owned by his uncle, Nolan Gallion Sr., and the Hopkins family. He attended Harford Community College, where he earned a A.A. degree in political science in 1997. After graduating, he became a farmer, producing dairy from 1999 to 2004 and beef cattle and hay from 2004 onward.

Gallion got his first glimpse of politics at 13 years old, when he volunteered for Barry Glassman's first council race in Harford County. In 2016, he joined Glassman's administration as a part-time agricultural specialist in the Harford County Department of Governmental and Community Relations. Gallion also serves on the county's Economic Development Agricultural Advisory Board and is the liaison from the county's executive office to the Harford County Farm Bureau.

In 2006, Gallion unsuccessfully ran for the Harford County Council in District D, finishing second to Chad Shrodes in the Republican primary.

In 2007, Gallion applied to succeed delegate Barry Glassman, who had been appointed by Governor Martin O'Malley to the Maryland Senate following the resignation of senator J. Robert Hooper, in the Maryland House of Delegates. The Harford County Republican Central Committee voted unanimously to appoint attorney Howard Wayne Norman, Jr. to the House of Delegates. In 2010, Gallion ran an unsuccessful campaign for District 35A of the Maryland House of Delegates, running on a ticket alongside Dave Tritt and seeking to unseat Norman.

In 2011, Gallion served on the Harford County Council Redistricting Commission.

In 2014, Gallion again ran for the Maryland House of Delegates in District 35B, seeking to succeed retiring delegate Donna Stifler and delegate Wayne Norman, who sought election to the Maryland Senate. During the primary, he received the endorsement of the Maryland Farm Bureau PAC, the NRA Political Victory Fund, and the Cecil County Republican Club. He finished third in the three-way Republican primary, winning the majority of Cecil County.

In March 2018, following the unexpected passing of senator Wayne Norman, the Harford County Republican Central Committee tapped Gallion to succeed Norman on the primary election ballot. while Linda Norman, the late senator's wife, filled the remainder of his term in the Maryland Senate. In the months following his nomination, the central committee considered some political maneuvering that would allow delegate Teresa Reilly to run for state senate instead of re-election to the House of Delegates. Days before the Cecil County committee was scheduled to discuss supporting ballot realignment if both candidates declined the nomination, Gallion sent a letter to local GOP leaders that declared his intent to stay in the senate race. Consequentially, the Cecil County committee unanimously voted to table the possibility of ballot realignment. He defeated Independent candidate Frank Esposito and Libertarian Christopher Randers-Pehrson in the general election, receiving 67.6 percent of the vote.

== In the legislature ==
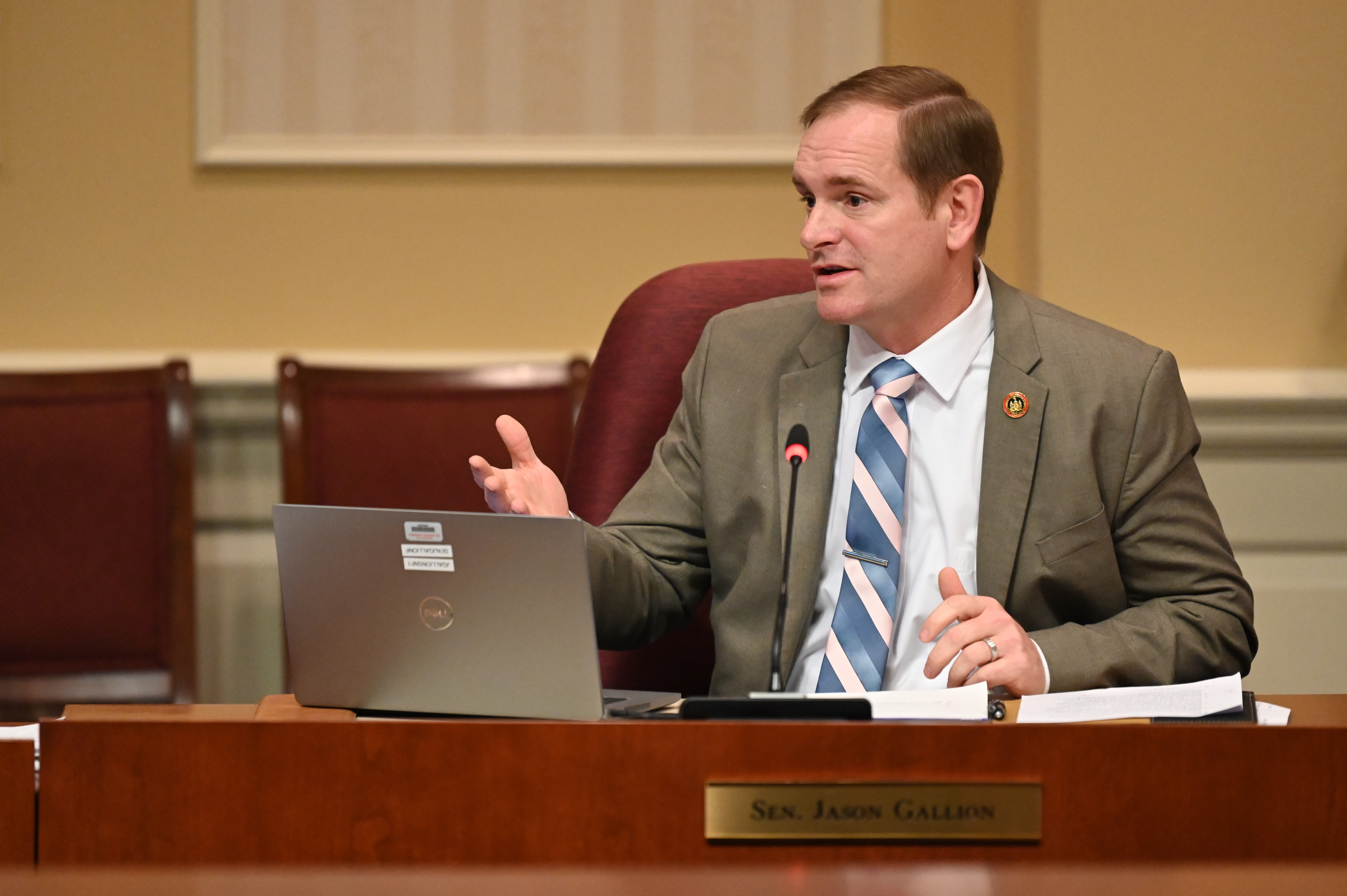
Gallion in the Senate Education, Energy, and the Environment Committee, 2024

Gallion was sworn into the Maryland Senate on January 9, 2019.

=== Committee assignments ===
- Member, Education, Health and Environmental Affairs Committee, 2019–present (environment subcommittee, 2019–present; health subcommittee, 2019–present)
- Joint Subcommittee on Program Open Space and Agricultural Land Preservation, 2019
- Joint COVID-19 Response Legislative Work Group, 2020–present

== Political positions ==
=== Agriculture ===
During the 2019 legislative session, Gallion introduced a bill that would allow farm equipment to travel on highways within a 25-mile radius of a farm. He also introduced legislation that would ban the sale of plant-based beverages under the "milk" label under the pretext that eleven other southern states adopt similar legislation by 2029. Both bills passed and were signed by Governor Larry Hogan in April 2019. During the 2020 legislative session, Gallion introduced a bill that would ban the sale of foods made of animal tissues cultured from cells outside of the original animal, plants, and insects under the "meat" label. The bill received an unfavorable report by the Maryland Senate Finance Committee.

=== Drugs ===
Gallion, having lost a loved one to the opioid epidemic, says that he supports increased drug prevention in schools to prevent more people from turning to opioids.

=== Economy ===
In 2019, Gallion was the only senator to receive a score of 100 percent on the Maryland Free Enterprise Foundation's annual scorecard.

=== Education ===
During a debate on the Blueprint for Maryland's Future education reform plan in March 2020, Gallion introduced an amendment that would have reduced the number of teaching scholarships by $16 million and reduced the expansion of the state's Judy Center network of early education hubs by $12 million. The amendment was rejected in a party-line vote. During the 2021 legislative session, he introduced a bill that would move appointing authority for the Harford County school board from the governor to the county executive, with input from the county council.

=== Elections ===
During the 2021 legislative session, Gallion, alongside state senators Justin Ready and Bryan Simonaire, introduced a bill that would require voters to show some form of identification before casting a ballot. He also sponsored bills would require people that deliver mail-in ballots to be a family member or part of the immediate household of the voter and ban campaign volunteers or candidates from delivering mail-in ballots for another vote, as well as increase penalties for voter fraud, including a four-year loss of voting rights. In March 2021, during a debate on legislation that would ban people from simultaneously running for elected public offices and political party offices and from holding both offices at the same time, Gallion proposed amending the bill to allow an individual to run for both offices at the same time so long as they can't simultaneously hold both offices. That same month, he opposed legislation that would expand the number of early voting centers in Maryland and permanently expand mail-in voting, worrying that the state might be putting an "extra burden" on local governments.

=== Environment ===
During debate on the Climate Solutions Now Act in February 2021, Gallion introduced an amendment to the bill that would push back the bill's goal of achieving net-zero emissions by 2050 instead of 2045. He also expressed concerns with the bill's tree planting program, saying it would create habitat for deer in agricultural buffer zones.

In February 2022, Gallion said that he would rather have the issue of community solar versus commercial solar stay in the hands of each county instead of the Maryland Public Service Commission.

In April 2026, Gallion was one of four senators to vote against the Utility RELIEF Act, an omnibus energy bill backed by Governor Wes Moore and Democratic legislative leaders.

=== Guns ===
Gallion, who describes himself as a Second Amendment advocate, has said that he is "leery" about red flag gun laws because he does not want to restrict rights for law-abiding citizens. During the 2019 legislative session, he introduced a bill that would allow Harford County farmers to use rifles and shotguns to rid their properties of animals that damage crops. The bill passed and was signed by Governor Hogan on April 18, 2019. During the 2021 legislative session, Gallion defended an amendment introduced by senator Jack Bailey that would exempt law enforcement officers, off-duty officers, or retired officers from legislation that prevents people from carrying guns in or near a polling place, arguing that having an armed law enforcement officer on hand could help quell a disturbance at a polling place if one arose.

=== Immigration ===
During the 2026 legislative session, Gallion opposed a bill that would prohibit counties from entering into 287(g) program agreements with U.S. Immigration and Customs Enforcement, saying that Maryland should not policies restricting the program in response to national furor over U.S. immigration enforcement in Minneapolis.

=== Marijuana ===
Gallion opposes legalizing recreational marijuana, preferring to wait and see what comes from states like Colorado as test cases. However, he has expressed interest in looking into how farmers could get involved in industrial hemp for medicinal use.

=== Redistricting ===
In 2019, Gallion cosponsored legislation introduced by Governor Hogan that would create an independent redistricting commission to draw Maryland's congressional and legislative district maps. During debate on Maryland's legislative redistricting plan in January 2022, he intended to introduce an amendment to stop the use of multi-member districts, replacing those districts with three single-member delegate subdistricts. However, the amendment was still being drafted on the day of the vote and the Maryland Senate rejected his request to delay the resolution.

In February 2026, Gallion said he opposed pursuing mid-decade redistricting in Maryland and opposed holding a vote on a bill that would redraw Maryland's congressional districts to improve the Democratic Party's chances of winning the 1st congressional district, the only congressional district held by Republicans in the state.

=== Social issues ===
In 2014, Gallion signed a petition to overturn Maryland's "bathroom bill", which allows a person undergoing gender re-assignment surgery or a person with gender dysphoria to use the restroom of their choice.

== Electoral history ==
Harford County Councilmanic District D Republican Primary Election, 2006
Party	Candidate	Votes	%
Republican	Chad Shrodes	1,950	47.35%
Republican	Jason C. Gallion	1,113	27.03%
Republican	Amy Hopkins Daney	664	16.12%
Republican	Doug Howard	277	6.73%
Republican	Charlie W. Burns	114	2.77%

Maryland House of Delegates District 35A Republican Primary Election, 2010
Party	Candidate	Votes	%
Republican	Donna Stifler	5,406	28.8%
Republican	Wayne Norman	4,849	25.8%
Republican	Jason C. Gallion	3,958	21.1%
Republican	Dave Tritt	2,716	14.5%
Republican	Dave Seman	1,843	9.8%

Maryland House of Delegates District 35B Republican Primary Election, 2014
Party	Candidate	Votes	%
Republican	Andrew Cassilly	3,866	34.3%
Republican	Teresa Reilly	3,782	33.5%
Republican	Jason Gallion	3,634	32.2%

Maryland Senate District 35 Republican Primary Election, 2018
Party	Candidate	Votes	%
Republican	Jason C. Gallion	8,064	100%

Maryland Senate District 35 General Election, 2018
Party	Candidate	Votes	%
Republican	Jason C. Gallion	33,813	67.3%
Unaffiliated	Frank Esposito	10,600	21.1%
Libertarian	Christopher Randers-Pehrson	5,632	11.2%
