= Susan K. McComas =

American politician (born 1951)

Susan McComas
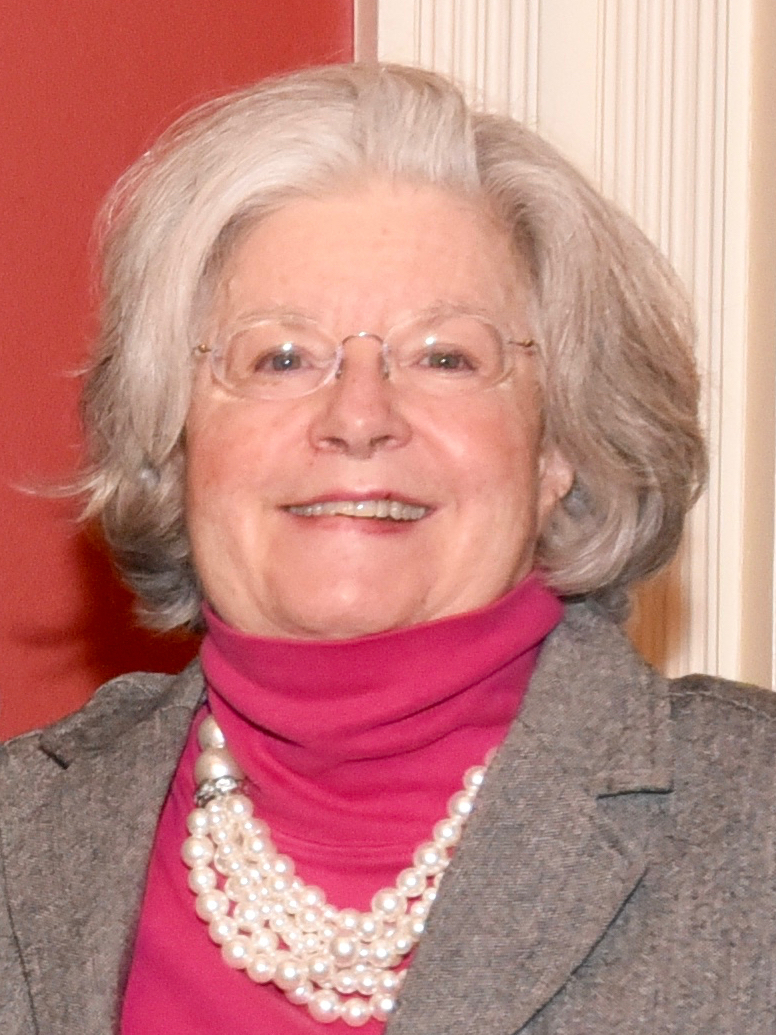
- McComas in 2017

Member of the Maryland House of Delegates
- Incumbent
- Assumed office January 8, 2003
- Preceded by: David D. Rudolph (35B); Redistricting (34B)
- Constituency: District 35B (2003–2015); District 34B (2015–present)

Personal details
- Born: April 3, 1951 (age 75) Denver, Colorado, U.S.
- Party: Republican
- Spouse: Charles McComas III (m. 1979)
- Education: Johns Hopkins University (B.A.); University of Colorado; University of Wyoming College of Law

Susan K. McComas (born April 3, 1951) is a member of the Maryland House of Delegates since 2002, first representing District 35B from 2003 to 2015 and then District 34B since 2015. A member of the Republican Party, she previously served on the Bel Air Town Commission from 1987 to 2002, and thrice served as the town's mayor.

== Early life and education ==
McComas was born in Denver on April 3, 1951, and raised in Wyoming. Two of her great-grandfathers, John H. Martin and John L. Murray, served the mayor of Cheyenne, Wyoming, from 1869 to 1870 and from 1901 to 1903 respectively, and her uncle James O'Neill served as the mayor of Bel Air, Maryland, from 1970 to 1974. McComas graduated from Cheyenne Central High School and later attended Johns Hopkins University, where she earned a Bachelor of Arts degree in social and behavioral sciences in 1974, studied at the University of Colorado Denver School of Public Affairs, and earned her Juris Doctor degree at the University of Wyoming College of Law in 1980, after which she was admitted to the Wyoming Bar and the Maryland Bar.

== Career ==
McComas has worked as an attorney in private practice since her graduation from the University of Wyoming, only briefly working in the Law Offices of Bruce J. Gilbert from 1984 to 1985. She was also a member of the board of directors of the Sexual Assault/Spouse Abuse Resource Center from 1982 to 1989.

McComas first became involved with politics as a file clerk for the Wyoming House of Representatives, after which she worked as a legal intern for the Wyoming Department of Health and for Albany County, Wyoming, and as a researcher for the National Organization of Social Security Claimants' Representatives. From 1983 to 1985, she worked as a commissioner for the Harford County District Court, afterwards unsuccessfully running for the Bel Air Town Commission. Following her defeat, McComas applied to serve on the Bel Air Town Historic District Commission. She ran again and won election to the Town Commission again in 1987, where she served until her election to the Maryland House of Delegates in 2002. McComas thrice served as the town's mayor from 1991 to 1992, from 1997 to 1998, and from 1999 to 2000. She was succeeded by Joan Morrissey Ward.

In January 1990, following the resignation of John W. Hardwicke from the Harford County Council, McComas applied to serve the remainder of his term. The Harford County Republican Central Committee voted to nominate her, Barry Glassman, and Jeffrey Wilson to the seat. The Harford County Council voted to appoint Wilson to the seat later that month.

From 1998 to 2002, McComas was a member of the Harford County Republican Central Committee.

=== Maryland House of Delegates ===
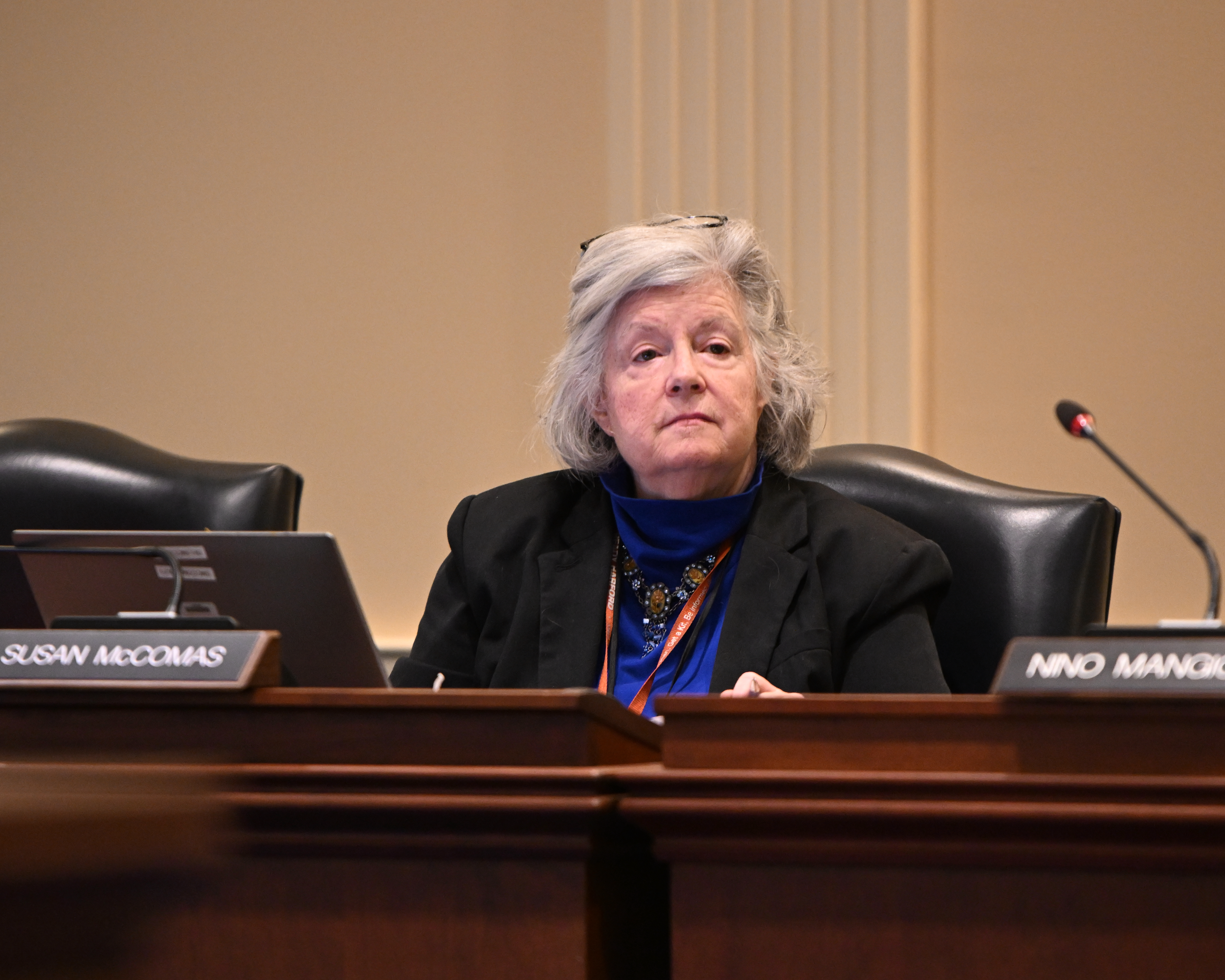
McComas in the Appropriations Committee, 2023

In April 2002, McComas filed to run for the Maryland House of Delegates in District 35B, which had no incumbent following redistricting. She ran on a platform involving transportation, crime, and development issues, and faced challengers Robert Shaffner and Francis Eurice in the Republican primary election, which she won with 50.1 percent of the vote. In the general election, McComas faced Bel Air town commissioner David E. Carey, whom she defeated with 61.4 percent of the vote. She was sworn in on January 8, 2003. She was a member of the Judiciary Committee from 2003 to 2023, afterwards serving on the Appropriations Committee until 2026, when she returned to the Judiciary Committee. McComas also served as deputy minority whip from 2015 to 2018, and from 2023 to 2027.

McComas is a member of the Harford County Delegation. She became the delegation's chair in 2008, during which she controversially hired her aide to be the delegation receptionist for the 2009 legislative session. McComas was ousted as chair in February 2009, after its members voted to replace her and vice chair Rick Impallaria with J.B. Jennings as chair and H. Wayne Norman Jr. as vice chair. She challenged the vote to remove her, and later filed an ethics complaint and rules violation claim against the delegation's new leaders, claiming that the vote to remove her as chair violated the Open Meetings Act and the Roberts Rules of Order. McComas was elected as the delegation's vice chair in 2021.

In March 2026, McComas withdrew from her re-election bid, citing political differences in the state and her disapproval of policies such as the state's ban on 287(g) program agreements.

== Political positions ==
=== Development initiatives ===
During her 1985 Bel Air Town Commissioner campaign, McComas said that she supported proposals to control the town's suburban growth, including annexation, warning of its "Towsonization". In 1987, she said she supported preserving the town's historical and architectural past, but conceded that preservation needed to be done with citizen cooperation. In 1995, McComas said that she opposed "any growth or development" that would increase tax burdens and demand for government services.

In January 2015, McComas supported efforts to block the construction of a Walmart in Bel Air.

=== Education ===
In February 2021, during debate on a bill to stagger of elected Harford County school board members' terms, McComas supported an amendment to create a fully-elected school board in the county. The amendment failed in a 4–4 tie.

In February 2022, McComas opposed a bill to repeal a law that allowed police to arrest children for disturbing school activities. During debate on the bill in the House, she remarked that "I've been accused of implicit bias because I said, you know, that Black fathers aren't as prevalent as they were in the 40s and 50s. The bottom line is that we need to understand that the teachers are dealing now with a society that has changed significantly." Her comments drew anger from other House lawmakers and prompted the bill's sponsor, Jazz Lewis, to issue a statement calling on McComas to immediately apologize for her remarks. She apologized on the House floor a few days later, saying that her words were "inarticulate" and that she intended to emphasize the importance of fathers.

During the 2023 legislative session, McComas supported the SERVE Act, a bill introduced by Governor Wes Moore to establish a service year option for high school graduates.

=== Electoral reform ===
In November 2000, McComas said she opposed Question A, a Harford County referendum to establish in-district elections of county councilmembers, saying that it would "pit one side of the county against another".

In June 2002, McComas celebrated the Maryland Court of Appeals' ruling against Maryland's legislative redistricting plan, calling it a "victory or the people of Maryland and the Republican party". During the 2017 legislative session, she introduced legislation to create a "redistricting task force" to draw Maryland's legislative and congressional districts.

=== Fiscal issues ===
In the legislature, McComas has voted against bills to raise the state minimum wage, which she says hurt small businesses. She opposes any increases to taxes or fees.

In March 1988, McComas said she opposed a state bill to lower the county's theater admission tax from ten percent to five percent, saying that the county would have to raise property taxes by two cents to make up for the lost revenue. Later that year, she proposed imposing a five percent tax on videotape rentals to make up for the lost revenue. In January 1992, McComas opposed a proposal by Harford County Executive Eileen M. Rehrmann to impose a $35 fee per ton of non-recyclable garbage dumped at county waste facilities, saying that the fee would force Bel Air to raise taxes. After the fee was passed, she said that the town would refuse to pay it. In May 1993, McComas said she opposed cutting the town's early filer tax discount. Later that month, she voted to half the tax discount to one percent, saying that it was "hard to swallow" but preferred it to raising taxes.

During the 2004 legislative session, McComas voted against a bill to raise $670 million in sales and income tax increases.

=== Gun policy ===
During the 2013 legislative session, McComas voted against the Firearm Safety Act, which banned semi-automatic rifles and required people buying any gun other than a hunting rifle or shotgun to obtain a license. In 2016, she attended a Second Amendment protection rally at the Maryland State House. In 2017, McComas introduced legislation to allow for bulk gun permit renewals and to prohibit law enforcement from collecting "certain captured data" from vehicles leaving gun shows without a warrant. In 2019, she supported the Parishioner Protection Act, a bill that would allow churchgoers to carry firearms. In 2022, McComas questioned the effectiveness of a bill to ban privately made firearms in Maryland.

=== Immigration ===
During the 2026 legislative session, McComas opposed a bill prohibiting counties from entering into 287(g) program agreements with U.S. Immigration and Customs Enforcement, saying that the bill eliminates local control and that restrictions on the program could put communities at risk.

=== Policing ===
During her 1985 Bel Air Town Commissioner campaign, McComas said that she supported increasing police salaries and hiring a full-time psychologist to help with police retention. In 1987, she said that she opposed a county law to reimburse towns for police training, suggesting that cadets in the Bel Air Police Academy should "pay for their education" like workers in other professions.

In 2005, McComas introduced legislation that would allow town police officers to cross jurisdictional borders to pursue drunk or reckless drivers.

In October 2020, following the murder of George Floyd, McComas said that she did not support banning police chokeholds, saying that the idea gave her "heartburn" and preferring instead to discourage their use.

=== Social issues ===
During the 2005 legislative session, McComas introduced legislation to ban egg donation for in vitro fertilisation or stem cell research. In 2023, she introduced legislation to prohibit women from getting an abortion without first having a medical ultrasound.

In April 2010, McComas voted against an impeachment resolution against Maryland Attorney General Doug Gansler for issuing an opinion supporting same-sex marriage. During the 2012 legislative session, she voted against the Civil Marriage Protection Act, which legalized same-sex marriage in Maryland.

In 2013, McComas opposed a bill to repeal the death penalty in Maryland, saying that it would make people feel less safe.

During the 2016 legislative session, McComas opposed a bill to abolish the statute of limitations for child sexual abuse cases, saying that she was "skeptical it would do any good". She was criticized by sexual abuse survivors for her response to an email from University of Maryland biotech researcher John Plaschke, who had emailed McComas asking her to support the bill, in which she wrote: "I hope that you have sought treatment and have moved beyond the abuse. It is very much about your personal resilience to live and thrive."

In 2017, McComas supported legislation to establish statewide police standards on the handling of rape kits.

During the 2019 legislative session, McComas voted against a bill to decriminalize attempted suicide, arguing that it would discourage police from preventing people from committing suicide.

=== Transportation ===
During her 1985 Bel Air Town Commissioner campaign, McComas said that she supported making Bel Air more pedestrian friendly and using public transportation to reduce traffic. In 2002, she said that she supported moving state transportation funding away from mass transit projects and toward building roads.

In 1998, McComas proposed constructing overhead walkways across Maryland Route 24 and U.S. Route 1 to connect pedestrians to the nearby Harford Mall. In May 2002, she voted against a proposal to expand Maryland Route 22 through Howard Park, saying that it would be unfair to the residents of the area.

== Personal life ==
McComas married to her husband, Charles Henry McComas III, whom she met while attending Johns Hopkins, in 1979. They moved to Bel Air, Maryland from Wyoming after college in 1980.

In January 2010, McComas suffered a heart attack while visiting her mother, who died a few hours after the incident, in Wyoming. She recovered from the heart attack after having two stents put in.

== Electoral history ==
Bel Air Town Commission election, 1985
Candidate	Votes	%
Phil Raub	481	20.0
Pat Goles	445	18.5
Chuck Robbins	318	13.2
Bill Elkin	271	11.2
Wayne Kirkman	201	8.3
Jack Cochran	175	7.3
Susan McComas	155	6.4
Henry Peden	127	5.3
John Kunkel	122	5.1
Joan Bates	116	4.8

Bel Air Town Commission election, 1987
Candidate	Votes	%
Geoffrey R. Close	325	26.9
Susan McComas	262	21.7
J. Vaughan McMahan	252	20.8
Irene A. Getz	168	13.9
William L. Cundiff	74	6.1
Estelle S. Bolton	65	5.4
Frederick L. Rush Jr.	53	4.4
Mark A. Ferragamo	10	0.8

Bel Air Town Commission election, 1991
Candidate	Votes	%
Susan McComas (incumbent)	385	33.4
Eugene Graybeal	348	30.2
Joseph Meadows	235	20.4
Madeleine W. Grant	99	8.6
Felix Tarasco	46	4.0
Donald J. Arnold	30	2.6
Janet A. Thomas	11	1.0

Bel Air Town Commission election, 1995
Candidate	Votes	%
Steve Burdette (incumbent)	454	17.4
Susan McComas (incumbent)	432	16.5
Mara Pais	342	13.1
David Carey	340	13.0
Robert Cassilly	282	10.8
Daniel Rozmiarek	255	9.8
Robert Greene	245	9.4
Mary Harkins-White	107	4.1
Arthur Coates Jr.	80	3.1
Terry Wolfe	45	1.7
Thomas Woelper	29	1.1

Harford County Republican Central Committee election, 1998
Party	Candidate	Votes	%
Republican	Susan McComas	8,024	9.9
Republican	Howard McComas IV	7,648	9.5
Republican	Habern D. Freeman	6,340	7.8
Republican	Lois Nagle	6,263	7.7
Republican	Karen Thompson	5,798	7.2
Republican	Joseph Price	5,723	7.1
Republican	James Kohl Jr.	5,488	6.8
Republican	Sandra Zubrowski	5,290	6.5
Republican	Carol MacCubbin	5,110	6.3
Republican	Glenn Brown	5,084	6.3
Republican	A. Blythe Corkran	4,965	6.1
Republican	Donald Stifler	4,887	6.0
Republican	Richard Morris Jr.	4,292	5.3
Republican	Thomas Ohlendorf	3,354	4.1
Republican	Lachelle Beazley-Stark	2,625	3.2

Bel Air Town Commission election, 1999
Candidate	Votes	%
Susan McComas (incumbent)	451	25.6
James Decker	288	16.3
Maureen L. Rowland (incumbent)	275	15.6
Tania Benfield	231	13.1
Janet Thomas	201	11.4
Lloyd Parker	160	9.1
Shelley Dolan	159	9.0

Maryland House of Delegates District 35B Republican primary election, 2002
Party	Candidate	Votes	%
Republican	Susan K. McComas	1,902	50.1
Republican	Robert E. Shaffner	1,725	45.4
Republican	Francis J. Eurice	171	4.5

Maryland House of Delegates District 35B election, 2002
Party	Candidate	Votes	%
Republican	Susan K. McComas	10,273	61.4
Democratic	David E. Carey	6,444	38.5
Write-in		12	0.1

Maryland House of Delegates District 35B election, 2006
Party	Candidate	Votes	%
Republican	Susan K. McComas (incumbent)	10,922	62.5
Democratic	David Carey	6,536	37.4
Write-in		9	0.1

Maryland House of Delegates District 35B election, 2010
Party	Candidate	Votes	%
Republican	Susan K. McComas (incumbent)	12,817	72.3
Democratic	John Janowich	4,884	27.6
Write-in		24	0.1

Maryland House of Delegates District 34B election, 2014
Party	Candidate	Votes	%
Republican	Susan K. McComas (incumbent)	11,801	72.7
Democratic	Cassandra R. Beverley	4,419	27.2
Write-in		20	0.1

Maryland House of Delegates District 34B election, 2018
Party	Candidate	Votes	%
Republican	Susan K. McComas (incumbent)	12,533	65.0
Democratic	Jeff Dinger	6,706	34.8
Write-in		57	0.3

Maryland House of Delegates District 34B election, 2022
Party	Candidate	Votes	%
Republican	Susan K. McComas (incumbent)	11,094	60.8
Democratic	Gillian A. Miller	7,111	39.0
Write-in		44	0.2
