= Teresa E. Reilly =

American politician (born 1958)

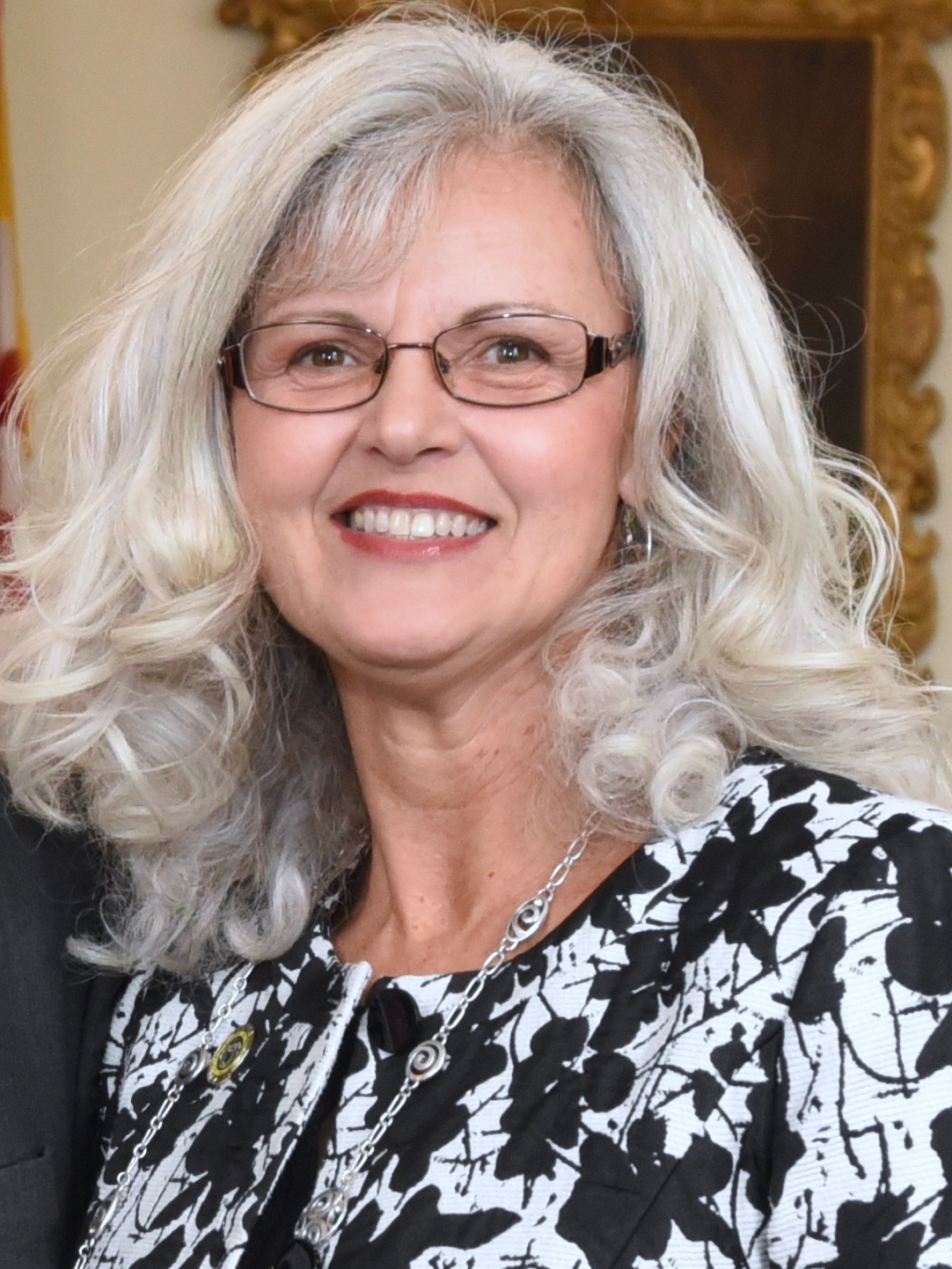
- Reilly in 2018

Member of the Maryland House of Delegates
- Incumbent
- Assumed office January 14, 2015 Serving with Mike Griffith
- Preceded by: H. Wayne Norman Jr.
- Constituency: District 35B (2015–2023); District 35A (2023–present)

Personal details
- Born: June 26, 1958 (age 68) Ohio, U.S.
- Party: Republican
- Spouse: James Reilly
- Children: 1

Teresa E. Reilly (born June 26, 1958) is an American politician from Maryland from the Republican Party. She is currently a member of the Maryland House of Delegates from District 35B, representing northern Cecil and Harford counties.

== Early life and career ==
Reilly was born in Ohio on June 26, 1958, and later moved to Essex, Maryland, where she attended Kenwood Senior High School. She is a former bank officer.

Reilly entered politics in 1997 by becoming a member of the Republican Club of Harford County, serving on its board of directors from 1997 to 2012. She also served as the vice chair of the Harford County Republican Central Committee from 2002 to 2014. From 2008 to 2013, she served as the chief of staff to state delegate H. Wayne Norman Jr. She is currently a member of the Republican Club of Cecil County. Reilly applied to fill a vacancy left by the resignation of former state senator J. Robert Hooper, who had resigned for health reasons in 2007.

Reilly previously served on the board of directors for the Liriodendron Foundation. She is a current member of the Maryland Horse Council, Maryland Farm Bureau, and the National Rifle Association, and currently serves on the Bainbridge Development Advisory Board and the Local Video Lottery Development Council of Cecil County.

== In the legislature ==
In September 2013, Reilly announced that she would run for the Maryland House of Delegates in District 35B, seeking to succeed state delegate H. Wayne Norman Jr., with whom she ran on a slate while he ran for state senate. She won the Republican primary in June 2014, placing second behind Andrew Cassilly, and defeated Democrats Jeffrey Elliott and Daniel Lewis Lamey in the general election.

Reilly was sworn in on January 14, 2015. She was a member of the Ways and Means Committee during her first term, and has since served in the Health and Government Operations Committee. She also served as deputy minority whip from 2015 to 2018.

In July 2015, after Governor Larry Hogan announced that he had been diagnosed with non-Hodgkin lymphoma, Reilly held a "Hogan Strong" vigil in Bel Air.

In 2018, following Norman's sudden death, the Maryland Republican Party eyed Reilly as his successor. However, she had already filed for re-election to the House of Delegates at the time of his death, which led to Jason C. Gallion being appointed to the seat.

== Political positions ==
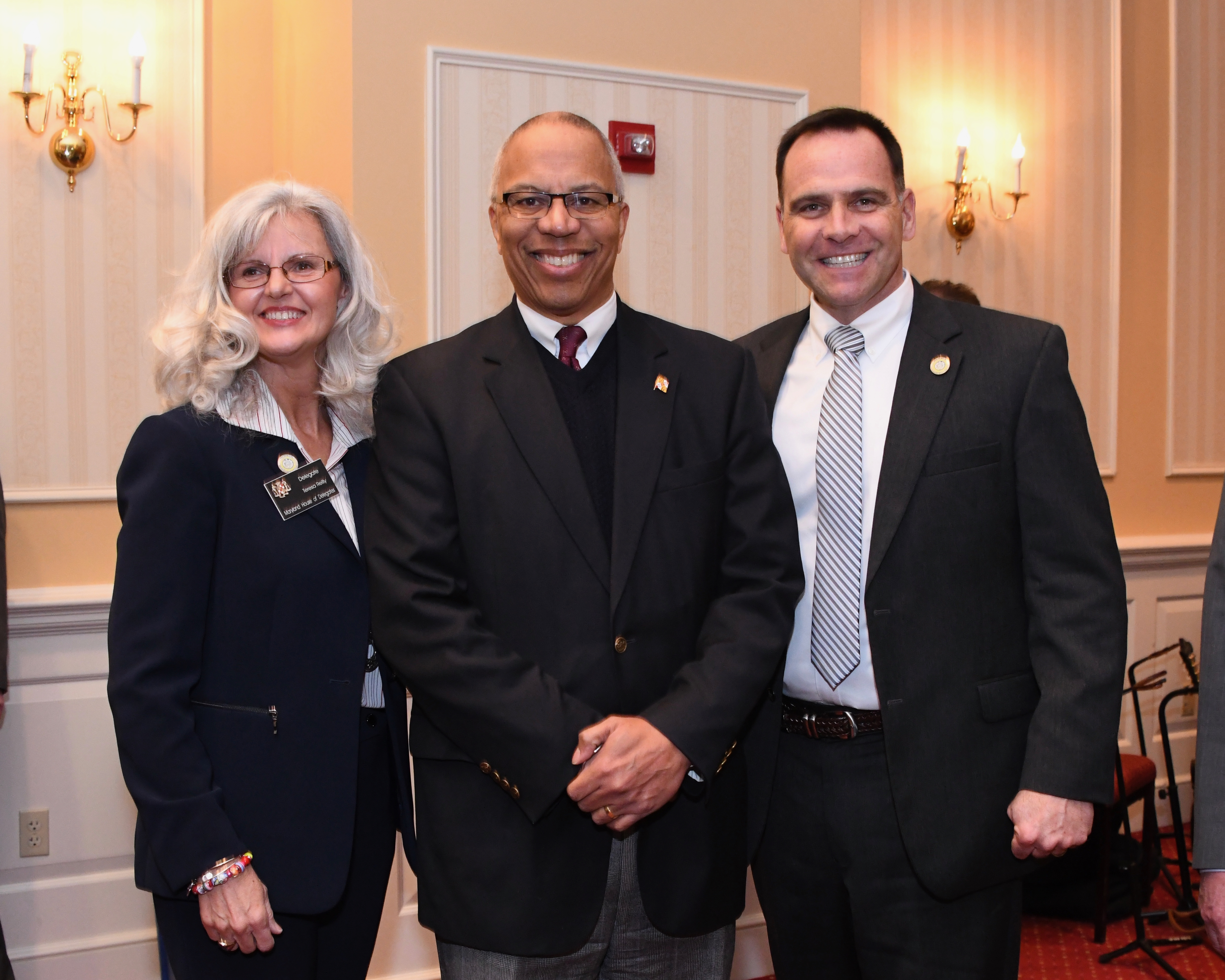
Reilly with Andrew Cassilly and Boyd Rutherford, 2018

During the 2016 legislative session, Reilly introduced a bill to dedicate a portion of Route 924 as "Heroes Highway" after two slain police deputies. The bill passed and was signed into law by Governor Larry Hogan.

In 2018, Reilly introduced legislation to sentence people convicted of selling opioids that result in a minor's death to up to 30 years in prison. The bill was introduced following the drug-overdose death of 17-year-old Amber Jones in 2016. She also supported a bill to give county deputies collective bargaining rights.

During the 2019 legislative session, Reilly supported the Parishioner Protection Act, a bill that would allow churchgoers to carry firearms.

In April 2020, Reilly co-signed a letter calling on the Maryland Department of Health to share data on the 2,000 inmates released during the COVID-19 pandemic. In August, she signed onto a letter calling for the partial reopening of Harford County public schools amid the COVID-19 pandemic.

In February 2021, Reilly voted against a bill to make all seven seats on the Harford County Board of Education into elected positions.

During the 2022 legislative session, Reilly opposed legislation to codify the right to access abortion care into the Constitution of Maryland, saying that the bills "ignored so many people in our state that believe this is a form of killing the innocent". During the 2025 legislative session, Reilly introduced a bill that would require the Maryland Department of Health to collect data on the costs of birth, postpartum care, pregnancy care, and abortion in the state.

== Personal life ==
Reilly is married to James J. Reilly, a member of the Harford County Council since 2022. Together, they have a child.

== Electoral history ==
Maryland House of Delegates District 35B Republican primary election, 2014
Party	Candidate	Votes	%
Republican	Andrew Cassilly	3,866	34.3
Republican	Teresa Reilly	3,782	33.5
Republican	Jason C. Gallion	3,634	32.2

Maryland House of Delegates District 35B election, 2014
Party	Candidate	Votes	%
Republican	Andrew Cassilly	23,556	42.8
Republican	Teresa Reilly	21,006	38.1
Democratic	Jeffrey Elliott	5,952	10.8
Democratic	Daniel Lewis Lamey	4,495	8.2
Write-in		72	0.1

Maryland House of Delegates District 35B election, 2018
Party	Candidate	Votes	%
Republican	Andrew Cassilly (incumbent)	26,494	48.6
Republican	Teresa Reilly (incumbent)	18,107	33.2
Democratic	Ronnie Teitler Davis	9,834	18.0
Write-in		128	0.2

Maryland House of Delegates District 35A election, 2022
Party	Candidate	Votes	%
Republican	Mike Griffith (incumbent)	25,988	53.3
Republican	Teresa Reilly (incumbent)	21,661	44.4
Write-in		1,147	2.4
