= H. Wayne Norman Jr. =

American politician

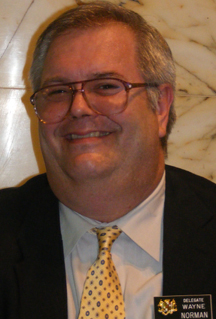
- Norman in 2008

Member of the Maryland Senate from the 35th district
- In office January 14, 2015 – March 4, 2018
- Preceded by: Barry Glassman
- Succeeded by: Linda Norman
- Constituency: Harford and Cecil counties

Member of the Maryland House of Delegates from the 35A district
- In office January 10, 2008 – January 13, 2015
- Preceded by: Barry Glassman
- Succeeded by: Andrew Cassilly and Teresa Reilly

Personal details
- Born: November 3, 1955 Baltimore, Maryland, U.S.
- Died: March 4, 2018 (aged 62)
- Resting place: Bel Air Memorial Gardens
- Party: Republican
- Spouse: Linda Isennock
- Profession: Attorney

H. Wayne Norman Jr. (November 3, 1955 – March 4, 2018) was an American lawyer and politician who was a member of the Maryland Senate, representing District 35 in Harford and Cecil counties. Norman was appointed to the Maryland House of Delegates in 2008 to fill the vacancy created when Delegate Barry Glassman was appointed to the Maryland State Senate to replace J. Robert Hooper, who resigned because of illness. Glassman subsequently was elected as Harford County Executive, leaving a vacancy in the Senate seat. Norman was elected to that vacant Senate seat in the 2014 General Election.

== Early life ==
Wayne Norman was born on November 3, 1955, to Juanita (née Clark) and Howard Norman. He graduated from the University of Baltimore in 1976 with a bachelor's degree in history. He graduated with a Juris Doctor from the University of Baltimore School of Law.

== Education ==
Norman graduated from the University of Baltimore in 1976 with a bachelor's degree in history. He returned to the University of Baltimore School of Law and received his J.D. in 1980. He was admitted to the Maryland Bar in 1981.

== Career ==
Prior to being appointed to the Maryland House of Delegates, Norman was a member of the Harford County Liquor Board. He was also a member of the Harford County Republican Central Committee from 1998 until 2007. He was a life member of the Harford County Republican Club. Also, he was a member of the Bel Air/Forest Hill Community Council. He was a member of the Harford Chamber of Commerce, the Western Maryland Railway Historical Society, and the Sons of the American Legion. In addition he was an honorary Life Member of the Kingsville Volunteer Fire Company. Norman maintained his law office in Bel Air, Maryland. He was a past President of the Harford County Bar Association (2008–2009).

== Personal life ==
Norman married Linda Isennock. They had two children, Howard Wayne III and Ashley.

Norman died on March 4, 2018, at the age of 62. He was buried in Bel Air Memorial Gardens.
