= Maryland Legislative District 35 =

American legislative district

Maryland's legislative district 35
- Represents parts of Cecil County and Harford County
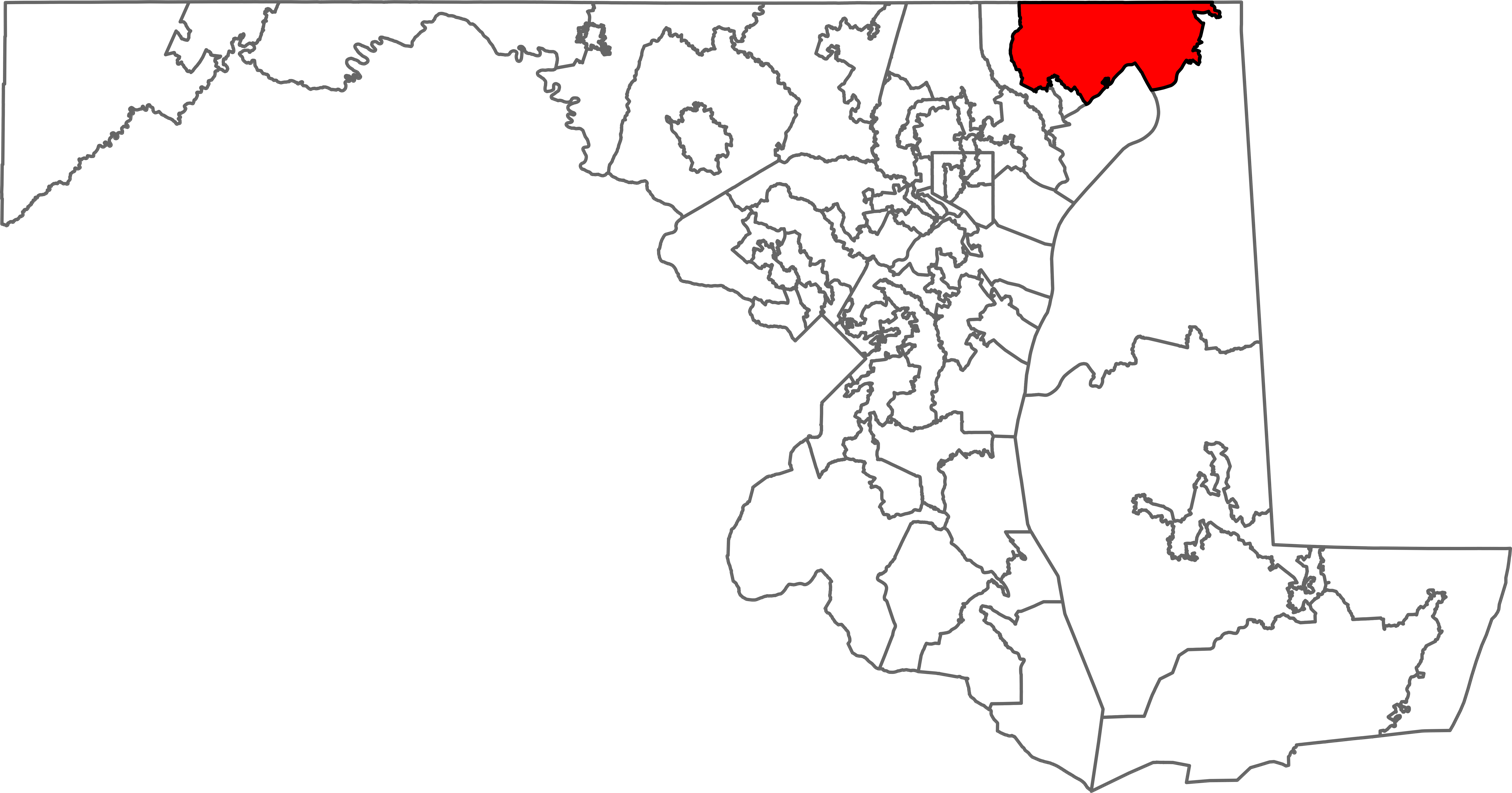
- Senator: Jason C. Gallion (R)
- Delegate(s): Michael Griffith (R) (District 35A); Teresa E. Reilly (R) (District 35A); Kevin B. Hornberger (R) (District 35B)
- Registration: 49.7% Republican; 28.0% Democratic; 20.7% unaffiliated
- Demographics: 85.0% White; 4.9% Black/African American; 0.2% Native American; 1.9% Asian; 0.0% Hawaiian/Pacific Islander; 1.4% Other race; 6.5% Two or more races; 4.0% Hispanic
- Population (2020): 132,271
- Voting-age population: 102,803
- Registered voters: 93,887

Maryland Legislative District 35 is one of 47 districts in the state for the Maryland General Assembly. It covers parts of Cecil County and Harford County. The district is divided into two sub-districts for the Maryland House of Delegates: District 35A and District 35B.

== Demographic characteristics ==
As of the 2020 United States census, the district had a population of 132,271, of whom 102,803 (77.7%) were of voting age. The racial makeup of the district was 112,391 (85.0%) White, 6,540 (4.9%) African American, 317 (0.2%) Native American, 2,552 (1.9%) Asian, 45 (0.0%) Pacific Islander, 1,845 (1.4%) from some other race, and 8,578 (6.5%) from two or more races. Hispanic or Latino of any race were 5,267 (4.0%) of the population.

The district had 93,887 registered voters as of October 17, 2020, of whom 19,425 (20.7%) were registered as unaffiliated, 46,677 (49.7%) were registered as Republicans, 26,322 (28.0%) were registered as Democrats, and 806 (0.9%) were registered to other parties.

== Political representation ==
The district is represented for the 2023–2027 legislative term in the State Senate by Jason C. Gallion (R) and in the House of Delegates by Michael Griffith (R, District 35A), Teresa E. Reilly (R, District 35A) and Kevin B. Hornberger (R, District 35B).
