= 1998 Maryland House of Delegates election =

- November 3, 1998

All 141 seats in the Maryland House of Delegates 71 seats needed for a majority
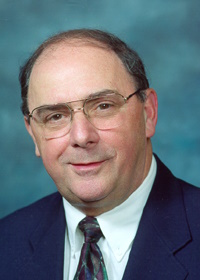

	Majority party	Minority party
Leader	Casper R. Taylor Jr.	Robert H. Kittleman
Party	Democratic	Republican
Leader since	January 8, 1994	December 7, 1994
Leader's seat	District 1C	District 14B
Last election	100	41
Seats won	106	35
Seat change	▲6	▼6
- Results: Democratic gain Republican gain Democratic hold Republican hold
Speaker before election
Casper R. Taylor Jr.
Democratic
Elected Speaker
Casper R. Taylor Jr.
Democratic

The 1998 Maryland House of Delegates elections were held on November 3, 1998, as part of the 1998 United States elections, including the 1998 Maryland gubernatorial election. All 141 of Maryland's state delegates were up for reelection.

Republicans hoped that gubernatorial nominee Ellen Sauerbrey would provide the party with enough coattails to continue making gains in the Maryland House of Delegates. However, Democrats, buoyed by large turnout and backlash to impeachment proceedings against Bill Clinton, picked up a net of six seats from Republicans. It would be the first time the Democratic Party gained seats in the House of Delegates since 1978.

== Retiring incumbents ==
=== Democrats ===
1. District 16: Gilbert J. Genn retired.
2. District 24: Nathaniel Exum retired to run for state senator in District 24.
3. District 25: Michael A. Crumlin retired.
4. District 26: C. Anthony Muse retired to run for state senator in District 26.
5. District 33: Marsha G. Perry retired.
6. District 34: Rose Mary Hatem Bonsack retired.
7. District 34: Mary Louise Preis retired to run for state senator in District 34.
8. District 41: Frank Boston retired to run for run for state senator in District 41.
9. District 41: Clay C. Opara retired.
10. District 44: Clarence Mitchell IV retired to run for run for state senator in District 44.
11. District 44: Carmena F. Watson retired.

=== Republicans ===
1. District 3: J. Anita Stup retired.
2. District 6: Kenneth Holt retired to run for run for state senator in District 6.
3. District 34: Nancy Jacobs retired to run for run for state senator in District 34.
4. District 35A: James M. Harkins retired to run for Harford County Executive.
5. District 37A: Don B. Hughes retired.
6. District 39: W. Raymond Beck retired.

== Incumbents defeated ==
=== In primary elections ===
==== Democrats ====
1. District 1B: Betty Workman lost renomination to Kevin Kelly.
2. District 11: Robert L. Frank lost renomination to Robert Zirkin and incumbents Michael Finifter and Dan K. Morhaim.
3. District 25: Brenda B. Hughes lost to Anthony G. Brown, Melony G. Griffith, and incumbent Dereck E. Davis.

=== In general elections ===
==== Democrats ====
1. District 2B: Bruce Poole lost to Christopher B. Shank.
2. District 5: Ellen Willis Miller lost to Carmen M. Amedori and incumbents Joseph M. Getty and Nancy R. Stocksdale.
3. District 35A: Michael G. Comeau lost to Barry Glassman and Joanne S. Parrott.

==== Republicans ====
1. District 13B: John S. Morgan lost to John A. Giannetti Jr.
2. District 14A: Patricia Anne Faulkner lost to Tod David Sher.
3. District 30: Phillip D. Bissett lost to C. Richard D'Amato and incumbents Michael E. Busch and Virginia P. Clagett.
4. District 31: Victoria L. Schade lost to Mary Rosso and incumbents Joan Cadden and John R. Leopold.
5. District 32: Michael W. Burns lost to Theodore J. Sophocleus and incumbents Mary Ann Love and James E. Rzepkowski.
6. District 39: Barrie Ciliberti and Mathew Mossburg lost to Charles E. Barkley, Joan F. Stern, and Paul H. Carlson.

== Detailed results ==
All election results are from the Maryland State Board of Elections.

=== District 1A ===
Maryland House of Delegates District 1A election
Party	Candidate	Votes	%
Republican	George C. Edwards (incumbent)	7,999	82.7
Democratic	Lawson L. Duckworth	1,670	17.3
Republican hold			

=== District 1B ===
Maryland House of Delegates District 1B election
Party	Candidate	Votes	%
Democratic	Kevin Kelly	5,232	51.2
Republican	Patricia Wolfe	4,991	48.8
Democratic hold			

=== District 1C ===
Maryland House of Delegates District 1C election
Party	Candidate	Votes	%
Democratic	Casper R. Taylor Jr. (incumbent)	6,205	70.1
Republican	Eileen Brinker Steele	2,648	29.9
Democratic hold			

=== District 2A ===
Maryland House of Delegates District 2A election
Party	Candidate	Votes	%
Republican	Robert A. McKee (incumbent)	8,198	100.0
Republican hold			

=== District 2B ===
Maryland House of Delegates District 2B election
Party	Candidate	Votes	%
Republican	Christopher B. Shank	4,873	51.3
Democratic	Bruce Poole (incumbent)	4,626	48.7
Republican gain from Democratic			

=== District 2C ===
Maryland House of Delegates District 2C election
Party	Candidate	Votes	%
Democratic	John P. Donoghue (incumbent)	4,996	83.9
Democratic	Paul D. Muldowney (write-in)	956	16.1
Democratic hold			

=== District 3 ===
Maryland House of Delegates District 3 election
Party	Candidate	Votes	%
Republican	Louise Virginia Snodgrass (incumbent)	19,196	20.8
Democratic	Sue Hecht (incumbent)	17,968	19.5
Republican	Joseph R. Bartlett	15,784	17.1
Republican	William M. Castle	15,251	16.5
Democratic	Richard L. Stup	13,191	14.3
Democratic	David P. Koontz	10,858	11.8
Republican hold			
Democratic hold			
Republican hold			

=== District 4A ===
Maryland House of Delegates District 4A election
Party	Candidate	Votes	%
Republican	David R. Brinkley (incumbent)	15,383	38.6
Republican	Paul S. Stull (incumbent)	14,559	36.5
Democratic	Valerie M. Hertges	9,892	24.8
Republican hold			
Republican hold			

=== District 4B ===
Maryland House of Delegates District 4B election
Party	Candidate	Votes	%
Republican	Donald B. Elliott (incumbent)	6,897	66.6
Democratic	Valerie M. Hertges	3,452	33.4
Republican hold			

=== District 5 ===
Maryland House of Delegates District 5 election
Party	Candidate	Votes	%
Republican	Nancy R. Stocksdale (incumbent)	27,665	30.2
Republican	Joseph M. Getty (incumbent)	25,114	27.5
Republican	Carmen M. Amedori	21,969	24.0
Democratic	Ellen Willis Miller (incumbent)	16,735	18.3
Republican hold			
Republican hold			
Republican gain from Democratic			

=== District 6 ===
Maryland House of Delegates District 6 election
Party	Candidate	Votes	%
Democratic	Nancy Hubers	13,154	18.9
Democratic	Diane DeCarlo (incumbent)	13,110	18.8
Democratic	Michael H. Weir (incumbent)	12,828	18.4
Republican	Joseph A. DiCara	11,703	16.8
Republican	Michael J. Davis	9,599	13.8
Republican	Timothy P. Knepp	9,343	13.4
Democratic hold			
Democratic hold			
Democratic gain from Republican			

=== District 7 ===
Maryland House of Delegates District 7 election
Party	Candidate	Votes	%
Democratic	Jacob J. Mohorovic Jr. (incumbent)	16,338	23.2
Democratic	Joseph J. Minnick (incumbent)	15,095	21.5
Democratic	John S. Arnick (incumbent)	14,385	20.5
Republican	Jane Brooks	9,792	13.9
Republican	Russell Mirabile	8,947	12.7
Republican	Gary Adams	6,178	8.8
Democratic hold			
Democratic hold			
Democratic hold			

=== District 8 ===
Maryland House of Delegates District 8 election
Party	Candidate	Votes	%
Democratic	Kathy Klausmeier (incumbent)	19,835	21.0
Republican	Alfred W. Redmer Jr. (incumbent)	17,846	18.9
Republican	James F. Ports Jr. (incumbent)	17,756	18.8
Democratic	J. Joseph Curran III	17,583	18.7
Republican	Joseph C. Boteler III	11,306	12.0
Democratic	Taras Andrew Vizzi	9,927	10.5
Democratic hold			
Republican hold			
Republican hold			

=== District 9A ===
Maryland House of Delegates District 9A election
Party	Candidate	Votes	%
Republican	Martha Scanlan Klima (incumbent)	19,190	39.8
Republican	Wade Kach (incumbent)	18,382	38.2
Democratic	Stephen C. Kirsch	10,584	22.0
Republican hold			
Republican hold			

=== District 9B ===
Maryland House of Delegates District 9B election
Party	Candidate	Votes	%
Republican	James M. Kelly (incumbent)	9,514	100.0
Republican hold			

=== District 10 ===
Maryland House of Delegates District 10 election
Party	Candidate	Votes	%
Democratic	Emmett C. Burns Jr. (incumbent)	23,203	35.6
Democratic	Shirley Nathan-Pulliam (incumbent)	21,348	32.7
Democratic	Adrienne A. Jones (incumbent)	20,676	31.7
Democratic hold			
Democratic hold			
Democratic hold			

=== District 11 ===
Maryland House of Delegates District 11 election
Party	Candidate	Votes	%
Democratic	Michael J. Finifter	26,823	21.5
Democratic	Dan K. Morhaim	26,452	21.2
Democratic	Robert Zirkin	24,231	19.4
Republican	Virginia G. Schuster	17,825	14.3
Republican	Christian Cavey	15,574	12.5
Republican	Grant Harding	13,710	11.0
Independent	William T. Newton (write-in)	64	0.1
Democratic hold			
Democratic hold			
Democratic hold			

=== District 12A ===
Maryland House of Delegates District 12A election
Party	Candidate	Votes	%
Democratic	James E. Malone Jr. (incumbent)	13,222	31.4
Republican	Donald E. Murphy (incumbent)	10,920	26.0
Democratic	Steven J. DeBoy Sr.	10,669	25.4
Republican	Loyd V. Smith	7,245	17.2
Democratic hold			
Republican hold			

=== District 12B ===
Maryland House of Delegates District 12B election
Party	Candidate	Votes	%
Democratic	Elizabeth Bobo (incumbent)	9,625	63.9
Republican	Todd A. Arterburn	5,430	36.1
Democratic hold			

=== District 13A ===
Maryland House of Delegates District 13A election
Party	Candidate	Votes	%
Democratic	Shane Pendergrass (incumbent)	15,791	30.6
Democratic	Frank S. Turner (incumbent)	14,639	28.4
Republican	Michael Grasso	10,690	20.7
Republican	Hans K. Meeder	10,455	20.3
Democratic hold			
Democratic hold			

=== District 13B ===
Maryland House of Delegates District 13B election
Party	Candidate	Votes	%
Democratic	John A. Giannetti Jr.	4,950	58.5
Republican	John S. Morgan (incumbent)	3,512	41.5
Democratic gain from Republican			

=== District 14A ===
Maryland House of Delegates District 14A election
Party	Candidate	Votes	%
Democratic	Tod David Sher	7,132	54.1
Republican	Patricia Anne Faulkner (incumbent)	6,060	45.9
Democratic gain from Republican			

=== District 14B ===
Maryland House of Delegates District 14B election
Party	Candidate	Votes	%
Republican	Robert H. Kittleman (incumbent)	21,721	38.8
Republican	Robert Flanagan	21,152	37.8
Democratic	William C. Woodcock Jr.	13,071	23.4
Republican hold			
Republican hold			

=== District 15 ===
Maryland House of Delegates District 15 election
Party	Candidate	Votes	%
Democratic	Mark Kennedy Shriver (incumbent)	26,114	22.1
Republican	Jean B. Cryor (incumbent)	22,160	18.7
Republican	Richard A. La Vay (incumbent)	18,395	15.6
Democratic	David B. Dashefsky	17,818	15.1
Republican	William Ferner Askinazi	16,882	14.3
Democratic	Anthony Patrick Puca	16,841	14.2
Democratic hold			
Republican hold			
Republican hold			

=== District 16 ===
Maryland House of Delegates District 16 election
Party	Candidate	Votes	%
Democratic	Nancy Kopp (incumbent)	27,898	23.0
Democratic	Marilyn R. Goldwater (incumbent)	27,502	22.7
Democratic	William A. Bronrott	26,006	21.4
Republican	French Caldwell	13,836	11.4
Republican	Adam S. Feuerstein	13,074	10.8
Republican	Carol McChesney Palmer	13,044	10.7
Democratic hold			
Democratic hold			
Democratic hold			

=== District 17 ===
Maryland House of Delegates District 17 election
Party	Candidate	Votes	%
Democratic	Michael R. Gordon (incumbent)	18,805	21.6
Democratic	Cheryl Kagan (incumbent)	18,713	21.5
Democratic	Kumar P. Barve (incumbent)	18,617	21.4
Republican	Barney Gorin	11,293	13.0
Republican	Christopher Russell	10,078	11.6
Republican	Richard A. Marvin	9,534	11.0
Democratic hold			
Democratic hold			
Democratic hold			

=== District 18 ===
Maryland House of Delegates District 18 election
Party	Candidate	Votes	%
Democratic	Sharon Grosfeld (incumbent)	24,306	29.5
Democratic	Leon G. Billings (incumbent)	23,779	28.9
Democratic	John Adams Hurson (incumbent)	23,592	28.7
Republican	Albert Bullock	10,602	12.9
Democratic hold			
Democratic hold			
Democratic hold			

=== District 19 ===
Maryland House of Delegates District 19 election
Party	Candidate	Votes	%
Democratic	Henry B. Heller (incumbent)	25,851	28.1
Democratic	Adrienne A. Mandel (incumbent)	25,762	28.0
Democratic	Carol S. Petzold (incumbent)	25,193	27.4
Republican	John Naughton	15,100	16.4
Democratic hold			
Democratic hold			
Democratic hold			

=== District 20 ===
Maryland House of Delegates District 20 election
Party	Candidate	Votes	%
Democratic	Dana Lee Dembrow (incumbent)	22,396	27.2
Democratic	Sheila E. Hixson (incumbent)	21,895	26.6
Democratic	Peter Franchot (incumbent)	21,208	25.8
Republican	John C. Leahy	6,020	7.3
Republican	James K. Harrison Jr.	5,602	6.8
Republican	Franklin U. Hackenberg	5,163	6.3
Democratic hold			
Democratic hold			
Democratic hold			

=== District 21 ===
Maryland House of Delegates District 21 election
Party	Candidate	Votes	%
Democratic	Pauline Menes (incumbent)	14,869	23.8
Democratic	Barbara A. Frush (incumbent)	14,501	23.2
Democratic	Brian R. Moe (incumbent)	14,053	22.5
Republican	Frances C. Shellenberger	6,571	10.5
Republican	John W. Anna Jr.	6,522	10.4
Republican	Benny P. Aquilino	5,964	9.5
Democratic hold			
Democratic hold			
Democratic hold			

=== District 22A ===
Maryland House of Delegates District 22A election
Party	Candidate	Votes	%
Democratic	Richard A. Palumbo (incumbent)	11,375	50.4
Democratic	Anne Healey (incumbent)	11,204	49.6
Democratic hold			
Democratic hold			

=== District 22B ===
Maryland House of Delegates District 22B election
Party	Candidate	Votes	%
Democratic	Rushern Baker (incumbent)	4,630	83.4
Republican	Peter Justesen	923	16.6
Democratic hold			

=== District 23 ===
Maryland House of Delegates District 23 election
Party	Candidate	Votes	%
Democratic	Mary A. Conroy (incumbent)	27,018	27.3
Democratic	Joan Breslin Pitkin (incumbent)	26,904	27.2
Democratic	James W. Hubbard (incumbent)	25,100	25.3
Republican	Joseph Marvin Braswell Sr.	10,029	10.1
Republican	Paul Tucker	9,996	10.1
Democratic hold			
Democratic hold			
Democratic hold			

=== District 24 ===
Maryland House of Delegates District 24 election
Party	Candidate	Votes	%
Democratic	Joanne C. Benson (incumbent)	20,137	33.8
Democratic	Carolyn J. B. Howard (incumbent)	20,123	33.7
Democratic	Darren Swain	19,396	32.5
Democratic hold			
Democratic hold			
Democratic hold			

=== District 25 ===
Maryland House of Delegates District 25 election
Party	Candidate	Votes	%
Democratic	Anthony G. Brown	20,660	33.6
Democratic	Melony G. Griffith	20,595	33.5
Democratic	Dereck E. Davis (incumbent)	20,262	32.9
Democratic hold			
Democratic hold			
Democratic hold			

=== District 26 ===
Maryland House of Delegates District 26 election
Party	Candidate	Votes	%
Democratic	Obie Patterson (incumbent)	23,465	33.6
Democratic	David M. Valderrama (incumbent)	23,269	33.3
Democratic	Kerry A. Hill	23,174	33.1
Democratic hold			
Democratic hold			
Democratic hold			

=== District 27A ===
Maryland House of Delegates District 27A election
Party	Candidate	Votes	%
Democratic	James E. Proctor Jr. (incumbent)	20,572	50.1
Democratic	Joseph F. Vallario Jr. (incumbent)	20,492	49.9
Democratic hold			
Democratic hold			

=== District 27B ===
Maryland House of Delegates District 27B election
Party	Candidate	Votes	%
Democratic	George W. Owings III (incumbent)	7,603	56.8
Republican	Joseph J. Rooney	5,791	43.2
Democratic hold			

=== District 28 ===
Maryland House of Delegates District 28 election
Party	Candidate	Votes	%
Republican	Thomas E. Hutchins (incumbent)	18,012	22.8
Democratic	Van Mitchell (incumbent)	17,835	22.6
Democratic	Samuel C. Linton (incumbent)	17,268	21.9
Republican	James Crawford	12,780	16.2
Republican	Michael D. Hathaway	11,757	14.9
Republican	George C. Vann (write-in)	1,333	1.7
Republican hold			
Democratic hold			
Democratic hold			

=== District 29A ===
Maryland House of Delegates District 29A election
Party	Candidate	Votes	%
Democratic	John F. Wood Jr. (incumbent)	5,782	55.8
Republican	Shane Mattingly	4,584	44.2
Democratic hold			

=== District 29B ===
Maryland House of Delegates District 29B election
Party	Candidate	Votes	%
Democratic	John F. Slade III (incumbent)	6,327	65.6
Republican	Donald Lee O'Neal	3,316	34.4
Democratic hold			

=== District 29C ===
Maryland House of Delegates District 29C election
Party	Candidate	Votes	%
Republican	Tony O'Donnell (incumbent)	8,401	59.3
Democratic	John M. Gott	5,772	40.7
Republican hold			

=== District 30 ===
Maryland House of Delegates District 30 election
Party	Candidate	Votes	%
Democratic	Michael E. Busch (incumbent)	24,075	21.2
Democratic	Virginia P. Clagett (incumbent)	24,036	21.2
Democratic	C. Richard D'Amato	20,223	17.8
Republican	Phillip D. Bissett (incumbent)	18,690	16.5
Republican	Edward J. Turner	14,119	12.4
Republican	Tony McConkey	12,353	10.9
Democratic hold			
Democratic hold			
Democratic gain from Republican			

=== District 31 ===
Maryland House of Delegates District 31 election
Party	Candidate	Votes	%
Republican	John R. Leopold (incumbent)	21,632	22.6
Democratic	Joan Cadden (incumbent)	19,214	20.1
Democratic	Mary Rosso	15,372	16.1
Republican	Victoria L. Schade (incumbent)	15,366	16.1
Republican	Robert Schaeffer	12,092	12.7
Democratic	Thomas J. Fleckenstein	11,862	12.4
Republican hold			
Democratic hold			
Democratic gain from Republican			

=== District 32 ===
Maryland House of Delegates District 32 election
Party	Candidate	Votes	%
Democratic	Mary Ann Love (incumbent)	15,823	18.9
Democratic	Theodore J. Sophocleus	15,382	18.4
Republican	James E. Rzepkowski (incumbent)	14,959	17.8
Republican	Michael W. Burns (incumbent)	13,247	15.8
Democratic	Victor Sulin	12,658	15.1
Republican	Betty Ann O'Neill	11,752	14.0
Democratic hold			
Democratic gain from Republican			
Republican hold			

=== District 33 ===
Maryland House of Delegates District 33 election
Party	Candidate	Votes	%
Republican	Janet Greenip (incumbent)	23,256	20.1
Republican	David G. Boschert (incumbent)	23,173	20.1
Republican	Robert C. Baldwin (incumbent)	23,050	20.0
Democratic	Gayle Powell	16,145	14.0
Democratic	Marcia Richard	15,210	13.2
Democratic	Shelia Schneider	14,648	12.7
Republican hold			
Republican hold			
Republican hold			

=== District 34 ===
Maryland House of Delegates District 34 election
Party	Candidate	Votes	%
Democratic	Mary-Dulany James	18,357	18.2
Republican	Charles Boutin	17,844	17.7
Democratic	B. Daniel Riley	17,798	17.7
Republican	Robert E. Shaffner	16,236	16.1
Democratic	Robin Walter	15,370	15.2
Republican	Michael Griffin	15,207	15.1
Democratic hold			
Republican hold			
Democratic hold			

=== District 35A ===
Maryland House of Delegates District 35A election
Party	Candidate	Votes	%
Republican	Barry Glassman	17,998	31.9
Republican	Joanne S. Parrott (incumbent)	14,963	26.5
Democratic	Michael G. Comeau (incumbent)	13,250	23.4
Democratic	Lee D. McDaniel	10,291	18.2
Republican hold			
Republican gain from Democratic			

=== District 35B ===
Maryland House of Delegates District 35B election
Party	Candidate	Votes	%
Democratic	David D. Rudolph (incumbent)	6,333	64.8
Republican	Robert H. Ward	3,433	35.2
Democratic hold			

=== District 36 ===
Maryland House of Delegates District 36 election
Party	Candidate	Votes	%
Republican	Mary Roe Walkup (incumbent)	17,720	19.2
Democratic	Ronald A. Guns (incumbent)	17,657	19.1
Democratic	Wheeler R. Baker (incumbent)	17,109	18.5
Republican	Richard A. Sossi	13,807	15.0
Republican	Ronald F. Lobos	13,301	14.4
Democratic	Clarence A. Hawkins	12,655	13.7
Republican hold			
Democratic hold			
Democratic hold			

=== District 37A ===
Maryland House of Delegates District 37A election
Party	Candidate	Votes	%
Democratic	Rudolph C. Cane	4,561	62.6
Republican	Jacqueline B. Jones	2,720	37.4
Democratic gain from Republican			

=== District 37B ===
Maryland House of Delegates District 37B election
Party	Candidate	Votes	%
Republican	Adelaide C. Eckardt (incumbent)	16,558	41.9
Republican	Kenneth D. Schisler (incumbent)	15,604	39.5
Democratic	William Steven Brohawn	7,340	18.6
Republican hold			
Republican hold			

=== District 38 ===
Maryland House of Delegates District 38 election
Party	Candidate	Votes	%
Democratic	Bennett Bozman (incumbent)	21,155	21.6
Democratic	Norman Conway (incumbent)	18,284	18.6
Republican	Charles A. McClenahan (incumbent)	17,112	17.4
Democratic	Ernest J. Leatherbury Sr.	15,771	16.1
Republican	Christopher Mills	14,896	15.2
Republican	Joseph Frederick Schanno	10,900	11.1
Democratic hold			
Democratic hold			
Republican hold			

=== District 39 ===
Maryland House of Delegates District 39 election
Party	Candidate	Votes	%
Democratic	Charles E. Barkley	17,020	18.4
Democratic	Paul Carlson	16,670	18.0
Democratic	Joan F. Stern	16,515	17.9
Republican	Barrie Ciliberti (incumbent)	14,420	15.6
Republican	Walter McKee	14,412	15.6
Republican	Mathew Mossburg (incumbent)	13,439	14.5
Democratic gain from Republican			
Democratic gain from Republican			
Democratic gain from Republican			

=== District 40 ===
Maryland House of Delegates District 40 election
Party	Candidate	Votes	%
Democratic	Tony E. Fulton (incumbent)	14,335	37.4
Democratic	Pete Rawlings (incumbent)	12,916	33.7
Democratic	Salima Siler Marriott (incumbent)	11,082	28.9
Democratic hold			
Democratic hold			
Democratic hold			

=== District 41 ===
Maryland House of Delegates District 41 election
Party	Candidate	Votes	%
Democratic	Lisa Gladden	14,355	34.1
Democratic	Nathaniel T. Oaks (incumbent)	14,139	33.6
Democratic	Wendell F. Phillips	13,543	32.2
Democratic hold			
Democratic hold			
Democratic hold			

=== District 42 ===
Maryland House of Delegates District 42 election
Party	Candidate	Votes	%
Democratic	Samuel I. Rosenberg (incumbent)	21,768	30.4
Democratic	James W. Campbell (incumbent)	20,903	29.2
Democratic	Maggie McIntosh (incumbent)	20,443	28.6
Republican	Jeffrey B. Smith Jr.	8,399	11.7
Democratic hold			
Democratic hold			
Democratic hold			

=== District 43 ===
Maryland House of Delegates District 43 election
Party	Candidate	Votes	%
Democratic	Michael V. Dobson (incumbent)	18,064	35.5
Democratic	Ann Marie Doory (incumbent)	16,743	32.9
Democratic	Kenneth C. Montague Jr. (incumbent)	16,094	31.6
Democratic hold			
Democratic hold			
Democratic hold			

=== District 44 ===
Maryland House of Delegates District 44 election
Party	Candidate	Votes	%
Democratic	Verna L. Jones	10,119	37.5
Democratic	Ruth M. Kirk (incumbent)	8,585	31.8
Democratic	Jeffrey A. Paige	7,171	26.6
Independent	Lisa M. Mitchell (write-in)	1,105	4.1
Democratic hold			
Democratic hold			
Democratic hold			

=== District 45 ===
Maryland House of Delegates District 45 election
Party	Candidate	Votes	%
Democratic	Clarence "Tiger" Davis (incumbent)	11,631	34.4
Democratic	Hattie N. Harrison (incumbent)	11,287	33.4
Democratic	Talmadge Branch (incumbent)	10,882	32.2
Democratic hold			
Democratic hold			
Democratic hold			

=== District 46 ===
Maryland House of Delegates District 46 election
Party	Candidate	Votes	%
Democratic	Cornell N. Dypski (incumbent)	12,888	34.9
Democratic	Carolyn J. Krysiak (incumbent)	12,316	33.3
Democratic	Peter A. Hammen (incumbent)	11,771	31.8
Democratic hold			
Democratic hold			
Democratic hold			

=== District 47A ===
Maryland House of Delegates District 47A election
Party	Candidate	Votes	%
Democratic	Timothy D. Murphy (incumbent)	8,363	42.9
Democratic	Brian K. McHale (incumbent)	7,823	40.2
Republican	William W. Sheldon	1,774	9.1
Republican	Anthony F. Forlenza	1,518	7.8
Democratic hold			
Democratic hold			

=== District 47B ===
Maryland House of Delegates District 47B election
Party	Candidate	Votes	%
Democratic	Thomas E. Dewberry (incumbent)	7,815	68.5
Republican	John A. Hoffman	3,597	31.5
Democratic hold			
