= Alberro =

Alberro is a surname. Notable people with the surname include:

- Gabe Alberro (born 1976), American writer, songwriter, and filmmaker
- José Alberro (born 1969), American baseball player

== See also ==
- Albero
