= William H. Amoss =

American politician (1936 - 1997)

Maryland Senate, District 35
- In office 1983 – October 8, 1997
- Preceded by: Frederick C. Malkus, Jr.
- Succeeded by: Donald C. Fry

Personal details
- Born: December 2, 1936 Baltimore, Maryland
- Died: October 8, 1997 (aged 60) Fallston, MD
- Party: Democratic

William H. Amoss (December 2, 1936 – October 8, 1997) was an American politician. He was a member of the Maryland Senate from 1983 until his death 14 years later.

== Background ==
Born and raised on his family's farm, Model Farm, in Fallston, William remained an active farmer in Harford County for all of his life.

Amoss was a member of the Maryland House of Delegates from 1975 until 1983. He was then elected to the Maryland Senate from 1983 until his death in 1997, representing District 35, which covers Harford and Cecil Counties. Upon his death, Democratic Governor Parris Glendening appointed former State Delegate, Donald Fry, to be Senator Amoss' successor. Fry was defeated by Republican challenger J. Robert Hooper in the 1998 general election by 10 percentage points.

== Education ==
Senator Amoss attended both private and public schools in Harford County. He also attended Harford Community College and the University of Maryland, Overseas program.

== Career ==
After high school, Amoss served in the United States Army from 1955 until 1958. He worked as an auctioneer for much of his career.

In addition to his public office, he was also a member of several organizations, including the Maryland Farm Bureau and the Maryland and National Auctioneers Associations, and he was a past director of the Bel Air Jaycees.

During his political career, he received the Legislator Recognition Award from the Maryland Association of Counties, in 1995. He was the chair of the Harford County Delegation from 1991 until his death in 1997.

After his death, Amoss had several initiatives named in his honor. Maryland passed the William H. Amoss Organ and Tissue Donation Act of 1998 in his honor. Additionally, there is an award named in his honor - the Senator William H. Amoss Legislator of the Year Award, which is awarded annually and also the State Fire, Rescue, and Ambulance Fund was renamed the Senator William H. Amoss Fire, Rescue, and Ambulance Fund in recognition of his efforts to provide fire, rescue, and ambulatory assistance to local departments. There is the William H. Amoss Hearing Room in the Miller Senate Building in Annapolis. Furthermore, Cecil County annually awards the Senator William H. Amoss Memorial Endowed Scholarship to residents of Cecil County that show a financial need. Finally, Harford Community College opened the William H. Amoss Performing Arts Center in May 2000, which adjoins the Harford Technical High School across the street from the college campus.

== Election results ==
- 1994 Race for Maryland State Senate – District 35

Voters to choose one:

Name	Votes	Percent	Outcome
William H. Amoss, Dem.	19,993	54%	Won
Gwendalynne G. Corkran, Rep.	13,245	36%	Lost
Catharine Wilson, Ind.	3,485	9%	Lost

- 1990 Race for Maryland State Senate – District 35

Voters to choose one:

Name	Votes	Percent	Outcome
William H. Amoss, Dem.	15,703	61%	Won
James Cooper, Rep.	9,853	39%	Lost

- 1986 Race for Maryland State Senate – District 35

Voters to choose one:

Name	Votes	Percent	Outcome
William H. Amoss, Dem.	16,142	69%	Won
James Cooper, Rep.	7,340	31%	Lost
