= María Izquierdo =

María Izquierdo may refer to:

- María Izquierdo (actress) (born 1960), Chilean actress
- María Izquierdo (artist) (1902–1955), Mexican painter
- María Pilar Izquierdo Albero (1906–1945), Spanish religious sister
- María Izquierdo Rojo (born 1946), Spanish politician
