= 1998 Maryland Senate election =

- November 3, 1998

All 47 seats of the Maryland Senate 24 seats needed for a majority
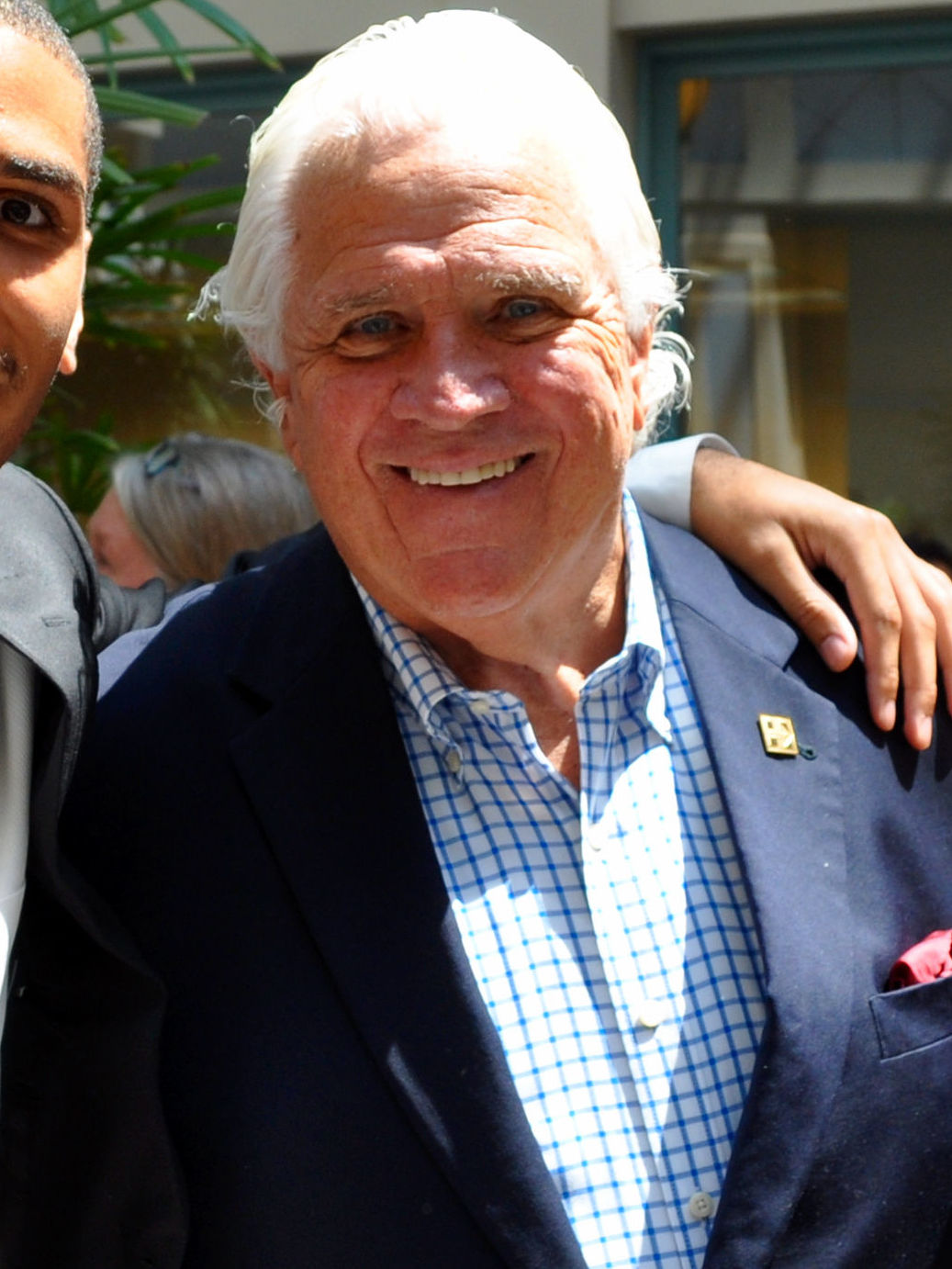

	Majority party	Minority party
Leader	Mike Miller	F. Vernon Boozer (lost renomination)
Party	Democratic	Republican
Leader since	January 21, 1987	1996
Leader's seat	27th district	9th district
Last election	32	15
Seats won	32	15
Seat change	Steady	Steady
President before election
Mike Miller
Democratic
President
Mike Miller
Democratic

The 1998 Maryland Senate election were held on November 3, 1998, to elect senators in all 47 districts of the Maryland Senate. Members were elected in single-member constituencies to four-year terms. These elections were held concurrently with various federal and state elections, including for Governor of Maryland.

== Summary ==
=== Closest races ===
Seats where the margin of victory was under 10%:

1. State Senate district 34, 0.37%
2. State Senate district 15, 1.84%
3. State Senate district 32, 3.65% (gain)
4. State Senate district 39, 9.26%
5. State Senate district 4, 9.59%

== Retiring incumbents ==
=== Republicans ===
1. District 33: David R. Craig retired to run for Harford County Executive.

== Incumbents defeated ==
=== In primary elections ===
==== Democrats ====
1. District 24: Decatur "Bucky" Trotter lost renomination to Nathaniel Exum.
2. District 44: John D. Jefferies lost renomination to Clarence Mitchell IV.

==== Republicans ====
1. District 3: John W. Derr lost renomination to Alex Mooney.
2. District 9: F. Vernon Boozer lost renomination to Andy Harris.

=== In general elections ===
==== Democrats ====
1. District 35: Donald C. Fry lost to J. Robert Hooper.

==== Republicans ====
1. District 32: C. Edward Middlebrooks lost to James E. DeGrange Sr.

== Detailed results ==
All election results are from the Maryland State Board of Elections.

=== District 1 ===
Maryland Senate District 1 election
Party	Candidate	Votes	%
Republican	John J. Hafer (incumbent)	20,552	100.0
Republican hold			

=== District 2 ===
Maryland Senate District 2 election
Party	Candidate	Votes	%
Republican	Donald F. Munson (incumbent)	22,347	100.0
Republican hold			

=== District 3 ===
Maryland Senate District 3 election
Party	Candidate	Votes	%
Republican	Alex Mooney	18,399	56.4
Democratic	Ronald S. Bird	14,212	43.6
Republican hold			

=== District 4 ===
Maryland Senate District 4 election
Party	Candidate	Votes	%
Republican	Timothy R. Ferguson (incumbent)	18,978	54.8
Democratic	George Hayes Littrell Jr.	15,656	45.2
Republican hold			

=== District 5 ===
Maryland Senate District 5 election
Party	Candidate	Votes	%
Republican	Larry E. Haines (incumbent)	29,341	100.0
Republican hold			

=== District 6 ===
Maryland Senate District 6 election
Party	Candidate	Votes	%
Democratic	Michael J. Collins (incumbent)	14,151	55.2
Republican	Kenneth Holt	11,463	44.8
Democratic hold			

=== District 7 ===
Maryland Senate District 7 election
Party	Candidate	Votes	%
Democratic	Norman R. Stone Jr. (incumbent)	21,142	100.0
Democratic hold			

=== District 8 ===
Maryland Senate District 8 election
Party	Candidate	Votes	%
Democratic	Thomas L. Bromwell (incumbent)	22,837	67.6
Republican	William Rush	10,954	32.4
Democratic hold			

=== District 9 ===
Maryland Senate District 9 election
Party	Candidate	Votes	%
Republican	Andy Harris	24,814	61.1
Democratic	Anthony O. Blades	15,780	38.9
Republican hold			

=== District 10 ===
Maryland Senate District 10 election
Party	Candidate	Votes	%
Democratic	Delores G. Kelley (incumbent)	25,995	100.0
Democratic hold			

=== District 11 ===
Maryland Senate District 11 election
Party	Candidate	Votes	%
Democratic	Paula Hollinger (incumbent)	33,726	100.0
Democratic hold			

=== District 12 ===
Maryland Senate District 12 election
Party	Candidate	Votes	%
Democratic	Edward J. Kasemeyer (incumbent)	20,953	57.2
Republican	David P. Maier	15,649	42.8
Democratic hold			

=== District 13 ===
Maryland Senate District 13 election
Party	Candidate	Votes	%
Republican	Martin G. Madden (incumbent)	19,407	56.3
Democratic	Raymond M. Rankin	15,062	43.7
Republican hold			

=== District 14 ===
Maryland Senate District 14 election
Party	Candidate	Votes	%
Republican	Christopher J. McCabe (incumbent)	27,093	57.8
Democratic	David S. Hantman	19,749	42.2
Republican hold			

=== District 15 ===
Maryland Senate District 15 election
Party	Candidate	Votes	%
Republican	Jean Roesser (incumbent)	20,824	50.9
Democratic	Gail Ewing	20,073	49.1
Republican hold			

=== District 16 ===
Maryland Senate District 16 election
Party	Candidate	Votes	%
Democratic	Brian Frosh (incumbent)	28,311	69.3
Republican	Augustus Alzona	12,564	30.7
Democratic hold			

=== District 17 ===
Maryland Senate District 17 election
Party	Candidate	Votes	%
Democratic	Jennie M. Forehand (incumbent)	20,099	67.8
Republican	Frederick Ugast	9,532	32.2
Democratic hold			

=== District 18 ===
Maryland Senate District 18 election
Party	Candidate	Votes	%
Democratic	Chris Van Hollen (incumbent)	24,111	73.2
Republican	Mark Spradley	8,818	26.8
Democratic hold			

=== District 19 ===
Maryland Senate District 19 election
Party	Candidate	Votes	%
Democratic	Leonard H. Teitelbaum (incumbent)	25,358	68.8
Republican	Lynn Siguenza	11,515	31.2
Democratic hold			

=== District 20 ===
Maryland Senate District 20 election
Party	Candidate	Votes	%
Democratic	Ida G. Ruben (incumbent)	22,501	79.8
Republican	Thomas R. Falcinelli	5,696	20.2
Democratic hold			

=== District 21 ===
Maryland Senate District 21 election
Party	Candidate	Votes	%
Democratic	Arthur Dorman (incumbent)	15,246	70.5
Republican	Richard Burkhart	6,385	29.5
Democratic hold			

=== District 22 ===
Maryland Senate District 22 election
Party	Candidate	Votes	%
Democratic	Paul G. Pinsky (incumbent)	16,582	100.0
Democratic hold			

=== District 23 ===
Maryland Senate District 23 election
Party	Candidate	Votes	%
Democratic	Leo E. Green (incumbent)	29,164	100.0
Democratic hold			

=== District 24 ===
Maryland Senate District 24 election
Party	Candidate	Votes	%
Democratic	Nathaniel Exum	21,316	100.0
Democratic hold			

=== District 25 ===
Maryland Senate District 25 election
Party	Candidate	Votes	%
Democratic	Ulysses Currie (incumbent)	21,934	100.0
Democratic hold			

=== District 26 ===
Maryland Senate District 26 election
Party	Candidate	Votes	%
Democratic	Gloria G. Lawlah (incumbent)	25,303	100.0
Democratic hold			

=== District 27 ===
Maryland Senate District 27 election
Party	Candidate	Votes	%
Democratic	Thomas V. Miller Jr. (incumbent)	27,582	69.4
Republican	Robert A. Sturgell	12,187	30.6
Democratic hold			

=== District 28 ===
Maryland Senate District 28 election
Party	Candidate	Votes	%
Democratic	Thomas M. Middleton (incumbent)	19,722	62.7
Republican	Allan R. Smith	11,710	37.3
Democratic hold			

=== District 29 ===
Maryland Senate District 29 election
Party	Candidate	Votes	%
Democratic	Roy Dyson (incumbent)	24,771	72.5
Republican	Culver Sprogle Ladd	9,386	27.5
Democratic hold			

=== District 30 ===
Maryland Senate District 30 election
Party	Candidate	Votes	%
Democratic	John Astle (incumbent)	26,029	64.8
Republican	Peter James DeNucci	14,154	35.2
Democratic hold			

=== District 31 ===
Maryland Senate District 31 election
Party	Candidate	Votes	%
Democratic	Philip C. Jimeno (incumbent)	22,917	66.9
Republican	Jacqueline J. Turley	11,364	33.1
Democratic hold			

=== District 32 ===
Maryland Senate District 32 election
Party	Candidate	Votes	%
Democratic	James E. DeGrange Sr.	15,445	51.8
Republican	C. Edward Middlebrooks (incumbent)	14,358	48.2
Democratic gain from Republican			

=== District 33 ===
Maryland Senate District 33 election
Party	Candidate	Votes	%
Republican	Robert R. Neall (incumbent)	32,088	100.0
Republican hold			

=== District 34 ===
Maryland Senate District 34 election
Party	Candidate	Votes	%
Republican	Nancy Jacobs (incumbent)	18,996	50.2
Democratic	Mary Louise Preis	18,857	49.8
Republican hold			

=== District 35 ===
Maryland Senate District 35 election
Party	Candidate	Votes	%
Republican	J. Robert Hooper	22,741	55.3
Democratic	Donald C. Fry (incumbent)	18,370	44.7
Republican gain from Democratic			

=== District 36 ===
Maryland Senate District 36 election
Party	Candidate	Votes	%
Democratic	Walter M. Baker (incumbent)	18,517	57.6
Republican	Allaire D. Williams	13,650	42.4
Democratic hold			

=== District 37 ===
Maryland Senate District 37 election
Party	Candidate	Votes	%
Republican	Richard F. Colburn (incumbent)	18,465	58.6
Democratic	Robert Alan Thornton Jr.	13,023	41.4
Republican hold			

=== District 38 ===
Maryland Senate District 38 election
Party	Candidate	Votes	%
Republican	J. Lowell Stoltzfus (incumbent)	22,122	
Democratic	Donald Ewalt	12,434	
Republican hold			

=== District 39 ===
Maryland Senate District 39 election
Party	Candidate	Votes	%
Republican	Patrick J. Hogan	17,082	54.6
Democratic	Maurice Miles	14,187	45.4
Republican hold			

=== District 40 ===
Maryland Senate District 40 election
Party	Candidate	Votes	%
Democratic	Ralph M. Hughes (incumbent)	16,818	96.1
Republican	Melvin E. Stubbs	683	3.9
Democratic hold			

=== District 41 ===
Maryland Senate District 41 election
Party	Candidate	Votes	%
Democratic	Clarence W. Blount (incumbent)	17,388	100.0
Democratic hold			

=== District 42 ===
Maryland Senate District 42 election
Party	Candidate	Votes	%
Democratic	Barbara A. Hoffman (incumbent)	25,583	100.0
Democratic hold			

=== District 43 ===
Maryland Senate District 43 election
Party	Candidate	Votes	%
Democratic	Joan Carter Conway (incumbent)	20,120	
Independent	Nimrod Westcott Jr.	2,914	
Democratic hold			

=== District 44 ===
Maryland Senate District 44 election
Party	Candidate	Votes	%
Democratic	Clarence Mitchell IV	11,304	100.0
Democratic hold			

=== District 45 ===
Maryland Senate District 45 election
Party	Candidate	Votes	%
Democratic	Nathaniel J. McFadden (incumbent)	15,005	100.0
Democratic hold			

=== District 46 ===
Maryland Senate District 46 election
Party	Candidate	Votes	%
Democratic	Perry Sfikas (incumbent)	14,891	100.0
Democratic hold			

=== District 47 ===
Maryland Senate District 47 election
Party	Candidate	Votes	%
Democratic	George W. Della Jr. (incumbent)	15,816	72.5
Republican	Edward Fowler	6,013	27.5
Democratic hold			
