= Barry Glassman =

American politician (born 1962)

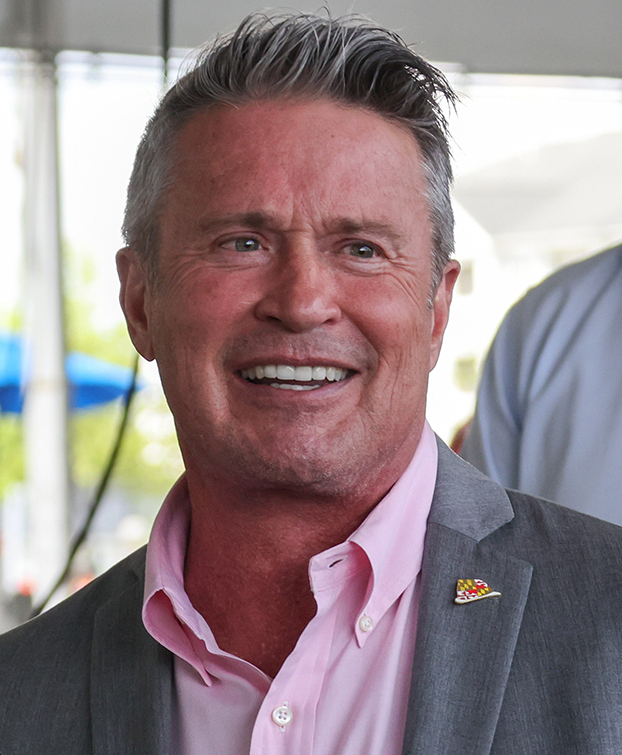
- Glassman in 2021

7th Executive of Harford County
- In office December 1, 2014 – December 5, 2022
- Preceded by: David Craig
- Succeeded by: Robert Cassilly

Member of the Maryland Senate from the 35th district
- In office January 10, 2008 – December 1, 2014
- Appointed by: Martin O'Malley
- Preceded by: J. Robert Hooper
- Succeeded by: H. Wayne Norman Jr.

Member of the Maryland House of Delegates from the 35A district
- In office January 13, 1999 – January 10, 2008 Serving with Joanne S. Parrott, Donna Stifler
- Preceded by: Michael G. Comeau; James M. Harkins
- Succeeded by: H. Wayne Norman Jr.

Member of the Harford County Council from District D
- In office 1990–1998
- Preceded by: J. Robert Hooper
- Succeeded by: Lance Miller

Personal details
- Born: Barry Thomas Glassman; March 24, 1962 (age 64) Havre de Grace, Maryland, U.S.
- Party: Republican
- Spouse: Deborah Sue Mitchell
- Children: 1
- Education: Washington College (BA)

Barry Thomas Glassman (born March 24, 1962) is an American politician who served as the 7th county executive of Harford County, Maryland, from 2014 to 2022. A member of the Republican Party, he served from 2008 to 2014 as a member of the Maryland Senate, representing the 35th district, and the Maryland House of Delegates from 1999 to 2008, representing District 35A.

Born and raised in Havre de Grace, Maryland, Glassman graduated from Washington College before working as a claims specialist with Travelers Insurance Company. He was elected to the Harford County Council in 1990, serving two terms before winning election to the Maryland House of Delegates in 1998. Glassman was appointed to the Maryland Senate in January 2008, following the resignation of J. Robert Hooper, and subsequently won election to a full term in 2010. He was elected Harford County Executive in 2014 and 2018.

Glassman ran for comptroller of Maryland in 2022, seeking to succeed incumbent Democratic Comptroller Peter Franchot, who unsuccessfully ran for governor. He ran unopposed in the Republican primary, but was defeated by state delegate Brooke Lierman in the general election on November 8, 2022.

== Early life and education ==
Barry Thomas Glassman was born on March 24, 1962, in Havre de Grace, Maryland, to Charles Glassman. He grew up on a sheep farm in Level. He attended Meadowvale Elementary and Havre de Grace Middle School. He graduated from Havre de Grace High School in 1980. After high school, he attended Washington College. In his freshman year, he was elected as president of Washington College's College Republicans. He became vice president and later president of the college's student council. In 1983, he presented the paper "Securing Access to Energy" at the Foreign Affairs Conference at the United States Naval Academy. He graduated in 1984 with a B.A. in political science. At graduation, he received the Henry W. C. Catlin Medal from the college faculty. He was a member of Omicron Delta Kappa. During college, he served as a legislative intern to state delegates Barbara Osborn Kreamer and William A. Clark.

== Career ==
After college, Glassman was a claims investigative specialist with Travelers Insurance Company until 1990, after which he worked as an utility claims representative until 2012.

Glassman became active in politics soon after college. He became a member of the Maryland Association of Counties in 1990 and was active until 1998. He was also a member of the National Association of Counties during the same time, serving on the rural affairs committee. He has been a member of the Maryland Claims Adjusters since 1990.

=== Harford County Council ===
In 1990, he also became a member of the Harford County Council, serving until 1998. He was the vice-president in 1995. He has served on several task forces, including the Task Force on Resource-Based Industry in Maryland, the Task Force to Study Motor Vehicle Salvage Inspection and Titling Practices, the Study Commission on Public Funding of Campaigns in Maryland, and the Task Force on the Future for Growth and Development in Maryland.

At a local level, Glassman is a member of the American Sheep Council, Harford County 4-H Club, the Harford County Farm Bureau, the Level Volunteer Fire Company, and Omicron Delta Kappa National Leadership Society.

=== In the legislature ===
Glassman was sworn into the Maryland House of Delegates on January 13, 1999. He was a member of the Environmental Matters Committee, the Economic Matters Committee, and the Commerce and Government Matters Committee. He was also the chair of the Harford County Delegation and the Republican Policy Committee, and a member of the Maryland Legislative Sportmen's Caucus, the Maryland Rural Caucus, the Maryland Bicycle and Pedestrian Caucus, the Maryland Veterans Caucus, and the Taxpayers Protection Caucus.

In January 2008, Glassman was appointed to the Maryland Senate, succeeding state senator J. Robert Hooper, who had resigned for medical reasons. He was a member of the Finance Committee and the Protocol Committee, was the Senate Chair of the Harford County Delegation, and a member of the Maryland Veterans Caucus.

=== Harford County Executive ===
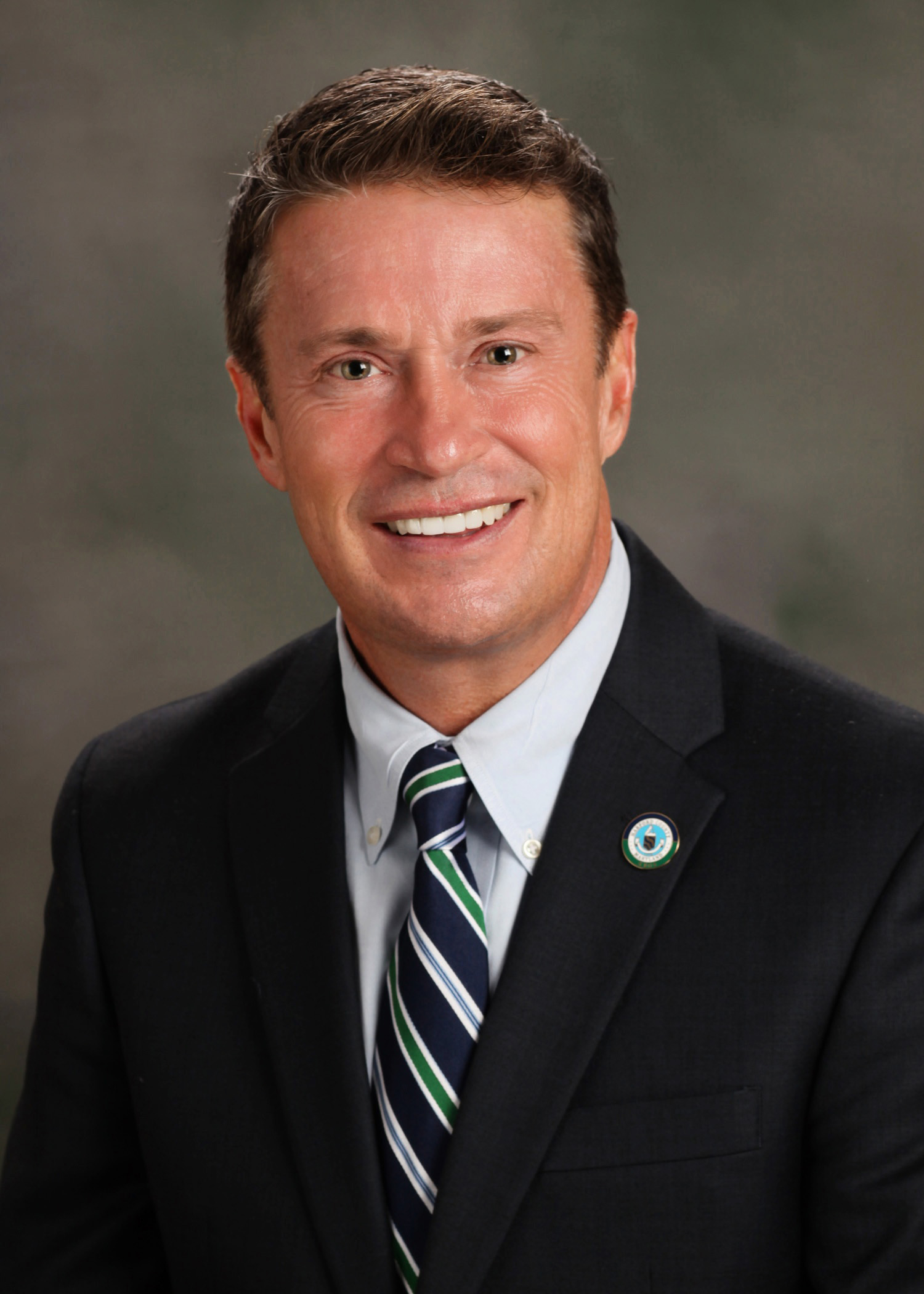
Glassman's official portrait as Harford County Executive

On June 7, 2013, Glassman said he would not seek re-election to the Maryland Senate in 2014, instead announcing a run for Harford County executive. He was unopposed in the Republican primary, and defeated Joe Werner in the general election with 74.8 percent of the vote. He was sworn in on December 1, 2014. Glassman ran for re-election in 2018, winning a second term with 67.4 percent of the vote.

In November 2015, Glassman said he was considering a run for the Republican nomination in the 2016 United States Senate election in Maryland. In January 2016, he said he would not run for Senate, instead continuing to serve as county executive.

=== 2022 Maryland Comptroller candidacy ===
In December 2020, Glassman, who was term-limited from running for a third-term as Harford County executive, said he was "weighing his options" on a possible run for governor, comptroller, or a congressional seat. On April 15, 2021, Glassman announced that he would run for Comptroller of Maryland in the 2022 election. In announcing his run, Glassman said he would have run for Maryland's 1st congressional district in 2022 had incumbent U.S. Representative Andy Harris "kept his promise on term limits".

Following the Republican primaries, in which he ran unopposed, Glassman refused to endorse either of the other two statewide Republican nominees, Dan Cox and Michael Peroutka. He lost to state delegate Brooke Lierman in the general election, receiving 38.3 percent of the vote. Following his defeat, Glassman worked as a lobbyist during the 2023 legislative session and started his own lobbying firm, Deer Creek Government Relations, in June 2023.

== Political positions ==
Glassman has been described as a moderate Republican.

=== Development initiatives ===
During his first year as county executive, Glassman unveiled a plan to revive development initiatives at the James Run corporate site near I-95, and with establishing an agricultural research and exposition center near Dublin.

In May 2022, Glassman vetoed a bill that would place a building development moratorium on the Perryman Peninsula, saying that the bill was "illegal" and violated the Harford County Code and the County Charter. The Harford County Council did not override Glassman's veto on the bill, despite previously voting unanimously to pass the bill.

=== Education ===
In February 2021, Glassman said he supported a bill introduced in the Maryland Senate to create an all-elected school board in Harford County.

=== Gun control ===
In March 2013, Glassman said that he opposed the Firearm Safety Act of 2013, calling the bill "an infringement on the law-abiding folks" and not a deterrent to criminals who use guns. Glassman voted against the bill in April 2013.

=== Healthcare ===
Glassman supported the creation of Maryland's Prescription Drug Affordability Board, a body tasked with making recommendations to the Maryland General Assembly on how to make prescription drugs more affordable. In May 2019, Glassman wrote an op-ed to Maryland Matters calling on Maryland governor Larry Hogan to sign the bill creating the agency into law.

=== Marijuana ===
In 2003, Glassman voted against a bill to legalize medical marijuana in Maryland, calling the bill a "revenue enhancement act for the drug dealers". Glassman later reversed his position on marijuana, supporting and voting for legislation to legalize medical marijuana and decriminalize small amounts of the drug in 2014, but said he did not support the full legalization of marijuana. In August 2021, Glassman said that he had "no objection" to putting the question of legalizing cannabis before voters, but said he'd "wait for pass judgement on the implementation legislation".

=== Social issues ===
Glassman opposed the Civil Marriage Protection Act, voting against it in both 2011 and 2012 and telling The Baltimore Sun, "I don't have a problem providing some right and privileges within a civil union, but I don't want to redefine what a traditional marriage is."

In March 2013, Glassman voted against legislation that would repeal the death penalty in Maryland.

In February 2019, Glassman called on state Delegate Mary Ann Lisanti, who represents part of Harford County in District 34A, to resign after she used the n-word to describe a Prince George's County legislative district.

Glassman condemned the 2021 United States Capitol attack, sending a tweet during the attack that read "Put this rebellion down!" and later sending an email condemning U.S. Representative Andy Harris's role in the incident. Shortly after the events, Glassman announced he would consider a run against Harris in 2022, but he ultimately ran for Comptroller of Maryland in 2022 instead.

=== Taxes ===
In May 2012, Glassman voted against Senate Bill 1302. In March 2013, he voted against a bill to raise the gas tax to replenish the state's transportation fund.

== Personal life ==
Glassman is a sheep farmer who lives in Darlington. He married Deborah "Debi" Sue Mitchell. Together, they have a child.

== Election results ==
Harford County Council District D Election, 1990
Party	Candidate	Votes	%
Republican	Barry Glassman	20,579	51.4
Democratic	J. Robert Hooper	19,489	48.6

Harford County Council District D Election, 1994
Party	Candidate	Votes	%
Republican	Barry Glassman	33,771	57.4
Democratic	Robert Hooper	24,655	41.9
Write-in		394	0.7

Maryland House of Delegates District 35A Republican Primary Election, 1998
Party	Candidate	Votes	%
Republican	Barry Glassman	3,028	24.3
Republican	Joanne S. Parrott	2,770	22.2
Republican	V. Rocky Gonzalez	2,638	21.1
Republican	James F. Greenwell	1,607	12.9
Republican	David C. Lipinski	952	7.6
Republican	Robert Church	768	6.2
Republican	Donald J. Stifler	714	5.7

Maryland House of Delegates District 35A Election, 1998
Party	Candidate	Votes	%
Republican	Barry Glassman	17,998	31.9
Republican	Joanne S. Parrott	14,963	26.5
Democratic	Michael G. Comeau	13,250	23.4
Democratic	Lee D. McDaniel	10,291	18.2

Maryland House of Delegates District 35A Election, 2002
Party	Candidate	Votes	%
Republican	Joanne S. Parrott	22,801	50.0
Republican	Barry Glassman	22,463	49.2
Write-in		387	0.9

Maryland House of Delegates District 35A Election, 2006
Party	Candidate	Votes	%
Republican	Barry Glassman	21,766	40.1
Republican	Donna Stifler	18,909	34.8
Democratic	Craig H. DeRan	13,589	25.0
Write-in		81	0.1

Maryland Senate District 35 Republican Primary Election, 2010
Party	Candidate	Votes	%
Republican	Barry Glassman	12,524	100.0

Maryland Senate District 35 Election, 2010
Party	Candidate	Votes	%
Republican	Barry Glassman	46,209	99.1
Write-in		439	0.9

Harford County Executive Republican Primary Election, 2014
Party	Candidate	Votes	%
Republican	Barry Glassman	15,063	100.0

Harford County Executive Election, 2014
Party	Candidate	Votes	%
Republican	Barry Glassman	66,595	74.8
Democratic	Joe Werner	22,387	25.1
Write-in		92	0.1

Harford County Executive Election, 2018
Party	Candidate	Votes	%
Republican	Barry Glassman	73,908	67.4
Democratic	Maryann Connaghan Forgan	35,557	32.4
Write-in		237	0.2

Maryland Comptroller Republican primary, 2022
Party	Candidate	Votes	%
Republican	Barry Glassman	232,414	100.0

Maryland Comptroller election, 2022
Party	Candidate	Votes	%	±%
Democratic	Brooke Lierman	1,223,044	61.56	−10.51
Republican	Barry Glassman	761,422	38.33	+10.54
Write-in		2,244	0.11	-0.03
Total votes		1,986,710	100.0	
Democratic hold				
