= Joseph H. Deckman =

American lacrosse player

Biographical details
- Died: August 16, 1969

Playing career
- 1929–1931: Maryland
- 1932: Mohawk A.C. (football)
- 1936: Tri-City
- 1937: Baltimore Athletic Club
- 1939–1941: Washington Athletic Association
- Position: Point

Coaching career (HC unless noted)
- 1932: Maryland (assistant)
- 1933: Maryland (freshmen)
- 1939–1941: Washington Athletic Association

Joseph H. Deckman (died August 16, 1969) was an American businessman and lacrosse player and coach. He was elected to the National Lacrosse Hall of Fame in 1965.

== Early life ==
Deckman attended Bel Air High School starting in 1914, where he played softball as a pitcher and competed in track and field. His relay team set a Harford County, Maryland record. In 1926, he played basketball for the Bel Air Town team until he suffered an illness.

== College career ==
In 1927, he enrolled at the University of Maryland, where he played on the freshman basketball and lacrosse teams. Deckman played three years of varsity lacrosse and two years of varsity football as a reserve tackle. He earned two letters in lacrosse and one in football. As a senior in 1931, Deckman was elected lacrosse team captain, and was a unanimous pick at the point position on the Spalding Official First All-American Lacrosse Team. The Baltimore Sun selected him to its All-Maryland team, and the Baltimore American named him as the defense captain to its All-America team.

The student body voted him as the best senior athlete and he served as the president of the Kappa Alpha Order. Deckman belonged to the Tau Beta Pi engineering honor society and the Omicron Delta Kappa national leadership honor society. Deckman graduated from Maryland with a Bachelor of Science degree in civil engineering in 1931.

== Later life ==
After graduation, Deckman was a volunteer assistant coach for the defense at his alma mater in 1932. He played as a quarterback for the Mohawk A.C. football team in Washington, D.C. In 1933, he coached the Maryland freshman team which finished undefeated. He served as a scout from 1933 to 1956. Deckman played on the Tri-City team in the Mount Washington Box Lacrosse League in 1936, and the following year, for the Baltimore Athletic Club lacrosse team, which won the National Open Lacrosse Championship. He helped establish the Washington Athletic Association in 1939 and served as a player, coach, and manager for its lacrosse team until 1941.

Deckman worked as the president and general manager of the R. Robinson, Inc. building supply company in the 1940s. He served as the chairman of the District of Columbia Federation of Citizens' Association, and the Public Housing Committees of the Home Builders' Association in Washington, D.C. After suffering a heart attack in 1949, he joined a group of friends, who called themselves the "Bon Vivants", as serious sport fishermen and gourmets aboard the vessel Algol. Deckman was the president of the "M" Club athletic alumni organization at the University of Maryland from 1950 to 1951. In 1956, the Maryland Athletic Hall of Fame was organized by the "M" Club at his suggestion. He became the club's treasurer in 1954. Deckman served as president of the Lacrosse Hall of Fame Foundation from 1967 to 1968.

He died on August 16, 1969. Deckman was inducted into the National Lacrosse Hall of Fame in 1965, and into the University of Maryland Athletic Hall of Fame in 1984.
