= Albero =

Albero is both a surname and a given name. Notable people with the name include:

- Maria Pilar Izquierdo Albero (1906–1945), Spanish nun
- Vicente Albero (born 1944), Spanish politician and economist
- Albero I of Louvain (1070–1128), Roman Catholic bishop
- Albero de Montreuil (c. 1080 – 1152), Roman Catholic archbishop
