= Joseph Lutz (politician) =

American politician (born 1948)

Joseph V. Lutz

Member of the Maryland House of Delegates from the 35A district
- In office 1983–1990
- Preceded by: district established
- Succeeded by: James M. Harkins (R) and Donald C. Fry (D)

Personal details
- Born: May 30, 1948 (age 78) Baltimore, Maryland, U.S.
- Party: Democratic
- Spouse: Joyce Petr
- Children: 2
- Education: Towson State University (BS); Johns Hopkins University (MS)
- Occupation: Politician; teacher

Military service
- Allegiance: United States
- Branch/service: Maryland Army National Guard (1970–1973); U.S. Army Reserve (1973–1979)
- Years of service: 1970–1979

Joseph V. Lutz (born May 30, 1948) is an American politician. He was a member of the Maryland House of Delegates, representing District 35A from 1983 to 1990.

== Early life ==
Joseph V. Lutz was born on May 30, 1948, in Baltimore, Maryland. He attended Calvert Hall High School. Lutz graduated from Towson State University with a Bachelor of Science in 1970. He graduated from Johns Hopkins University with a Master of Science in 1979.

== Career ==
Lutz worked in his family-owned lumber and hardware business from 1966 to 1974. He then served in the Maryland Army National Guard from 1970 to 1973 and then the U.S. Army Reserve from 1973 to 1979. Lutz was a teacher in Baltimore City Public Schools from 1970 to 1979. He then served as an account manager at Digital Equipment Corporation.

Lutz served in the Maryland House of Delegates from 1983 to 1990. He represented District 35A and was elected as a Democrat. He ran again for District 35A in the election of 1990 and 1994, but lost both times to James M. Harkins and Donald C. Fry.

== Personal life ==
Lutz married Joyce Petr. They had two children.
