= Harford Technical High School =

Coordinates: 39.5591°N 76.2875°W

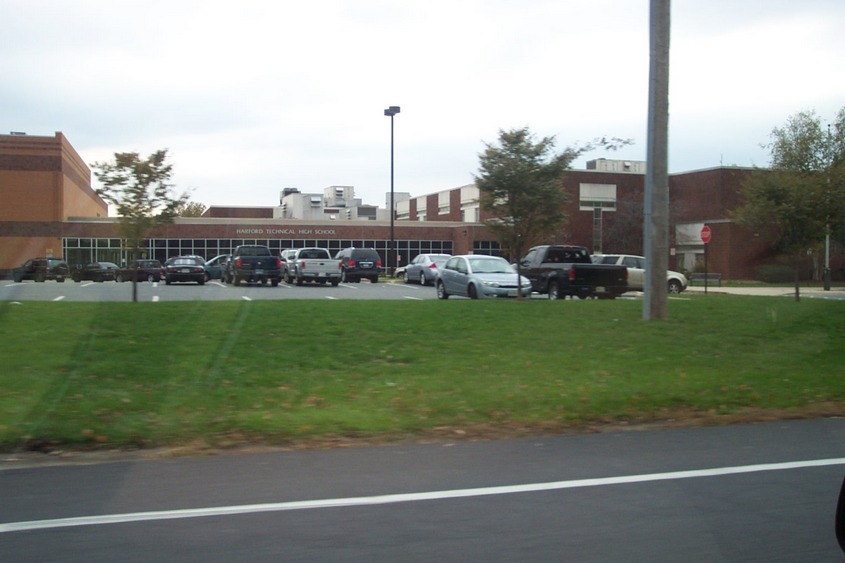

Location
- 200 Thomas Run Road; Bel Air, Maryland 21015; United States

Information
- Type: Public High School (9-12)
- Established: 1978
- School district: Harford County Public Schools
- Principal: Erin M. Mock
- Teaching staff: 62.74
- Enrollment: 979 (2022–23)
- Student to teacher ratio: 15.60
- Campus: 48.4 acres (196,000 m^{2})
- Color: Black Gold
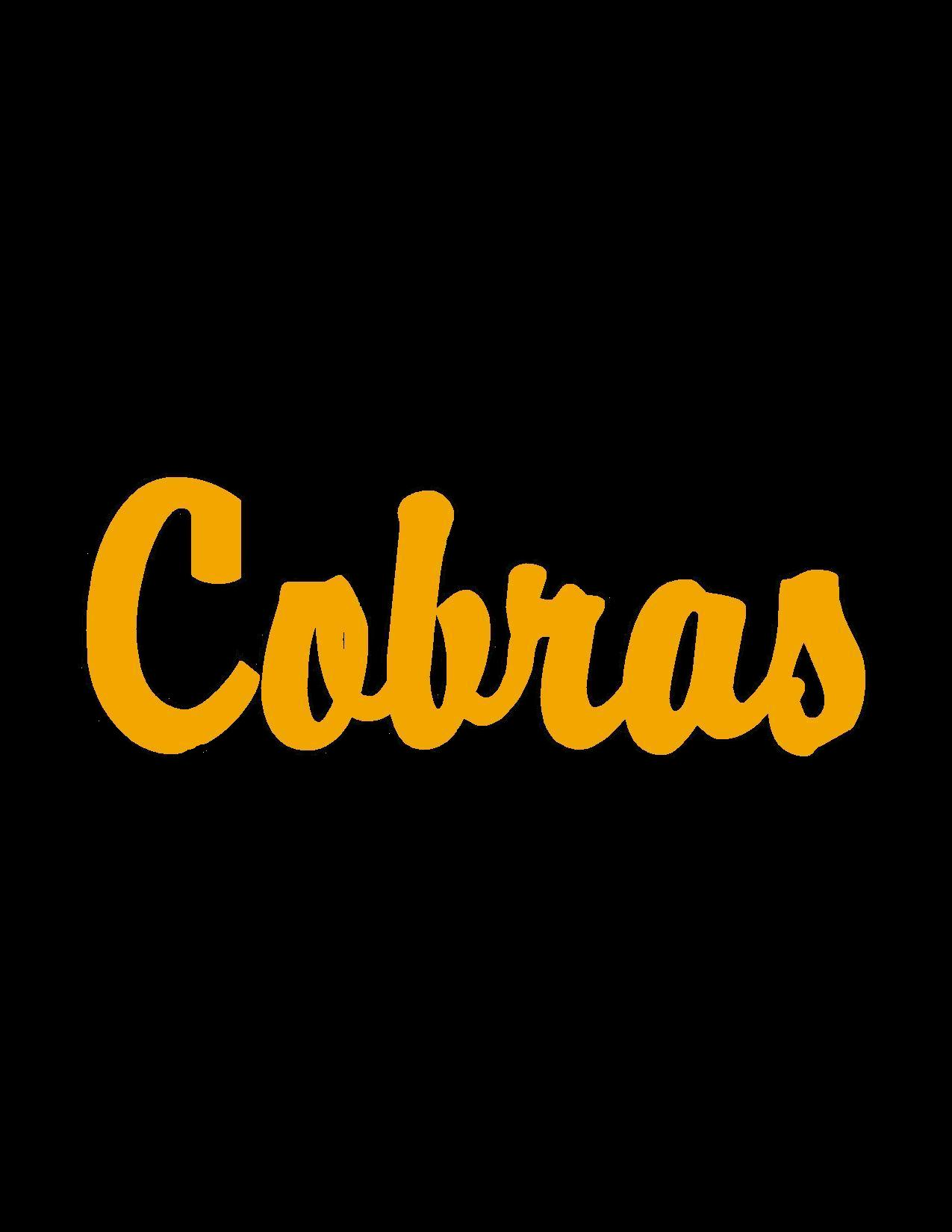
- Mascot
- Website: hths.hcpsschools.org

Harford Technical High School (HTHS) is a four-year technical public magnet school high school in Bel Air in Harford County, Maryland, United States. The school, located near the center of the county, is across the street from Harford Community College and next to the Harford Academy (formerly the John Archer School).

Harford Technical opened in 1978 as a vocational and technical school but now serves as Harford County's singular school for academic studies and career/technical education. Students in grades nine through 12 are offered opportunities to prepare for college, further post-secondary technical education, and/or enter into the work force or U.S. military through participation in one of nineteen career and technical programs, beginning in grade nine. Students in Harford County must apply to go to Harford Tech. Once entering the school, the students focus on a trade from one of the following: Construction, Manufacturing, Automotives, Computer Aided Design and Technical Drawing (Also known as Drafting, giving CADD its name), Food Preparation, Cosmetology, Agribusiness and TAM, Cyber Security, Floral Design, Landscape Architecture and Management, Printing and Graphic Arts, Nursing, and Sports Medicine.

The school has changed its name since the school was founded. It was once called "Harford Vocational Technical High School" or "Harford VoTech."

== History ==
The original building was finally constructed in the mid-70s. There have been several additions made to the school to accommodate more students including the new William H. Amoss Performing Arts Center, finished in 2000, and "Cobra Stadium" and surrounding athletic fields, finished in Spring 2009.

== Students ==
Since Harford Tech. is a magnet school, becoming a student there has become more and more competitive in recent years. Students who live in the Harford County School District must go through an application process to be admitted to Harford Tech. This is normally done in the students 8th Grade year. On average, the ratio of applications to available positions is 4:1, and about half of those applicants will get to the interview stage. About half of the students interviewed will then be admitted to the school. Students can only apply for a place in a single technical area. Consequently, there is a waiting list for admittance in any given year. Students not admitted will attend the regular high school in their catchment area or go private. In recent years, Harford Tech has used a lottery process as an additional selection stage.

Though the student population has leveled off in the past few years, it nearly doubled between 1993 and 2004 when enrollment peaked.

Year	Students enrolled
2018	1,010
2007	1,055
2006	1,052
2005	1,069
2004	1,070
2003	1,052
2002	1,014
2001	928
2000	900
1999	877
1998	833
1997	764
1996	716
1995	660
1994	607
1993	562

== Sports ==
State Champions:

- 2006 Wrestling 2A-1A
- 2006 Wrestling Coach Gary Siler named All-Metro Coach of the Year
- 2010 Girls Outdoor Track & Field Coach Michael Griffith named All-Metro Coach of the Year Baltimore Sun
- 2012 Winter Cheerleading
- 2018 Girls Outdoor Track & Field 2A
- 2018 Girls Outdoor Track & Field Coach Darrell Diamond named All-Metro Coach of the Year Baltimore Sun and Girls Maryland Coach of the Year U.S. Track & Field
- 2018 Fall Cheerleading
- 2023 Boys Soccer

In September 2025, the school’s football program came under scrutiny for an alleged hazing incident involving varsity players and an underclassman. This led to the firing of 4 coaching staff members, including the head coach.

== See also ==
- List of Schools in Harford County, Maryland
