= José Alberro =

Puerto Rican baseball player (born 1969)

- Pitcher
- Born: June 29, 1969 (age 56); Arecibo, Puerto Rico
- Batted: Right Threw: Right

Professional debut
- MLB: April 27, 1995, for the Texas Rangers
- CPBL: March 26, 2004, for the Uni-President Lions

Last appearance
- MLB: August 5, 1997, for the Texas Rangers
- CPBL: June 26, 2005, for the Uni-President Lions

MLB statistics
- Win–loss record: 0–4
- Earned run average: 7.41
- Strikeouts: 23

CPBL statistics
- Win–loss record: 11–14
- Earned run average: 3.02
- Strikeouts: 145
- Stats at Baseball Reference

Teams
- Texas Rangers (1995–1997); Uni-President Lions (2004–2005)

José Edgardo Alberro Zeno (born June 29, 1969) is a Puerto Rican former professional baseball pitcher. He played in Major League Baseball (MLB) for the Texas Rangers and in the Chinese Professional Baseball League (CPBL) for the Uni-President Lions. He batted and threw right-handed.

== Professional career ==
=== Texas Rangers ===
On June 11, 1991 Alberro signed with the Texas Rangers as an amateur free agent. In 1991 he split time with the Rookie-league Gulf Coast League Rangers and the Advanced-A Charlotte Rangers. He went a combined 2–1 with a 2.75 ERA in 24 games, all in relief.

In 1992 he split time with Advanced-A Charlotte and the Class-A Gastonia Rangers. He went a combined 2–1 with a 1.91 ERA and 16 saves in 45 games out of the bullpen.

Alberro was promoted to the Double-A Tulsa Drillers in 1993 where in 17 games he compiled no decisions with a 0.95 ERA and five saves. His outstanding play soon saw him a promotion to the Triple-A Oklahoma City 89ers where in 12 games he did not involve in a decision, though his ERA did balloon to a combined 3.75.

In 1994 he spent the entire season with the 89ers compiling a record of 4–3 with a 4.52 ERA and 11 saves in 52 games.

Alberro began the 1995 season with the 89ers and made his Major League Baseball debut on April 27. With the Rangers he involved in no decisions in 12 games, 20 2/3 innings pitched, and a 7.40 ERA. That same year with the 89ers he went 4–2 with a 3.36 ERA in 20 games, 10 for starts.

Most of Alberro's 1996 season was spent with the 89ers, though he did have a short stint with the Rangers. In 29 games, 27 for starts, Alberro compiled a 9–9 record with a 3.47 ERA with the Triple-A club. At the Major League level he went 0–1 with a 5.79 ERA in five games, one start.

In 1997 Alberro spent the first half of the season with the 89ers going 5–6 with a 4.22 ERA in 16 games, all for starts. His play at the Triple-A level received him a promotion to the Majors, going 0–3 with a 7.94 ERA in 10 games, four for starts. His last game was August 5, 1997.

=== New York Yankees ===
After his last game with the Rangers they attempted to assign Alberro to the minors. He refused the assignment and on August 11, 1997, he was claimed on waivers by the New York Yankees. Alberro never played at the Major League level after he was waived. He spent the '97 season with the Triple-A Columbus Clippers of the International League. In one game with the Clippers he registered a loss, giving up five hits, four runs (three earned), in eight innings pitched.

Alberro returned for the Yankees in 1998, pitching for the Clippers. He went 8–10 with a 4.52 ERA in 46 games, 13 for starts.

=== Detroit Tigers ===
Alberro began the 1999 season in the Detroit Tigers' Minor League system, splitting time with both the Double-A Jacksonville Suns and the Triple-A Toledo Mud Hens. With Toledo, the team in which he spent most of his time, he compiled a 2–2 record with a 5.25 ERA in 14 games.

=== Florida Marlins ===
In 1999 Alberro spent most of his time with the Triple-A Calgary Cannons. He was 3–2 with a 6.64 ERA in 24 games, eight for starts. The Marlins would become the last Major League organization Alberro would play for.

=== Atlantic League ===
Alberro signed with the Aberdeen Arsenal of the independent Atlantic League in 2000. He found some success coming out of the bullpen for the Arsenal going 3–6 with a 4.62 ERA in 49 games, pitching 60 1/3 innings.

In 2001 he split time with the Atlantic City Surf and the Newark Bears. He pitched well for Atlantic City, in 12 games he was involved in no decisions and compiled a 1.93 ERA. For the Bears he was less than perfect going 3–2 with a dismal 9.42 ERA in 13 games, one start.

=== Mexican League ===
Alberro spent his last two professional seasons pitching in the Mexican League. In 2005 he pitched 11 games for the Acereros de Monclova where he compiled a 2–1 record with a 6.87 ERA.

In 2006 with the Saraperos de Saltillo he went 0–1 with a 7.20 ERA in seven games.

== See also ==
- List of Major League Baseball players from Puerto Rico
