= William A. Clark (Maryland politician) =

American politician (born 1958)

Member of the Maryland House of Delegates from the 35A district
- In office 1983–1990
- Preceded by: district established
- Succeeded by: James M. Harkins (R) and Donald C. Fry (D)

Personal details
- Born: March 4, 1958 (age 68) Havre de Grace, Maryland, U.S.
- Party: Republican

William A. Clark (born March 4, 1958) is an American politician. He was a member of the Maryland House of Delegates, representing District 35A from 1983 to 1990.

== Early life ==
William A. Clark was born on March 4, 1958, in Havre de Grace, Maryland. He attended Bel Air High School in Bel Air, Maryland. He also attended Harford Community College.

== Career ==
Clark worked as a vice president of Clark Sales and Service.

Clark served in the Maryland House of Delegates from 1983 to 1990. He represented District 35A and was elected as a Republican.
