= Harford Community College =

Community college in Bel Air, Maryland, U.S.

- Type: Public community college
- Established: September 1957; 69 years ago (as "Harford Junior College")
- Endowment: $5.9 million (2016)
- President: Theresa B. Felder
- Academic staff: 106
- Students: 20,000 (Credit and Continuing Education)
- Location: Bel Air, Maryland, U.S. 39°33′38″N 76°17′2″W
- Campus: Suburban
- Colors
- Sporting affiliations: Maryland Junior College Athletic Conference (MD JUCO), and the National Junior College Athletic Association (NJCAA)
- Mascot: "Fighting Owls"
- Website: www.harford.edu

Harford Community College is a public community college in Bel Air, Maryland. It was established as Harford Junior College in September 1957 with 116 students in the buildings and on the campus of the Bel Air High School in the county seat. The Bel Air campus of 1964 occupies 332 acres (1.34 km^{2}) and now has 21 buildings totaling over 287,000 square feet (26,700 m^{2}).

== History ==
HCC was founded in September 1957 as the "Harford Junior College" on the campus and in the basement of the building for Bel Air High School with 116 original students. By four years later in September 1961, enrollment had risen to 354. In 1964, it moved to its current location east of Bel Air on Thomas Run Road in Bel Air, where it continued to grow and eventually was renamed "Harford Community College" in 1971, using the title of "community" which had become more popular in the former nationwide "junior college movement". Dating back into the 1920s with some public and a few private colleges at the lower level conceived and founded, with some earlier antecedents and similar schools appearing in Baltimore at the turn of the 20th Century (with The Baltimore City College - high school (1839) and lower college (1866), and later the Baltimore Polytechnic Institute (1883), that some old-time citizens of Harford County traveled into the city to avail themselves of the educational opportunities in the state's major city. Montgomery College in Montgomery County of the Maryland suburbs of Washington, D.C., was the first established in the state in 1946 of the modern concept of "junior college", followed by the Baltimore Junior College (again located first at the Baltimore City College) in 1947, (B.J.C. later renamed "Community College of Baltimore" during the 1960s, 70s, and 80s). Occasionally some Harford County residents currently avail themselves of the opportunities at the neighboring three campuses of the Community College of Baltimore County system at Catonsville, Essex or Dundalk. In the mid-1990s, the HCC began expanding, adding a new library, along with Fallston Hall, Edgewood Hall, new parking lots, and an expanded baseball sports facility. Continued future expansion is also expected with the ties and influence of Harfordians being very close.

== Academics ==
HCC has seven academic divisions that offer 61 associates degrees and 21 certificate degrees. The academic divisions are:

- Behavioral & Social Sciences
- Community Education, Business & Applied Technology
- Nursing & Allied Health Professions
- Arts & Humanities
- Science, Technology, Engineering & Math
- Visual, Performing & Applied Arts

Harford Community College is a member of the Maryland Association of Community Colleges.

== Athletics ==
HCC is represented by the mascot of the "Fighting Owls." This nickname was chosen during the institution's early years, when it was largely an evening college and the nocturnal nature of the Owl represented that fact.

Harford has traditionally had a successful athletics program, with over 70 students being named All-Americans on the junior college level of interscholastic sports.

=== Sports ===
The "Fighting Owls" compete in the Maryland Junior College Athletic Conference (MD JUCO) of the National Junior College Athletic Association (NJCAA). Harford currently offers 9 varsity sports, four men's and five women's teams.

Men's	Women's
Baseball	Basketball
Basketball	Flag Football
Lacrosse	Soccer
Soccer	Softball
[[]]	Volleyball

Football

From 1964 to 1985, Harford ran a successful scholastic football program. The program went to the National Junior College Athletic Association (NJCAA) football championship in 1984, where it lost to the Mississippi Gulf Coast Community College. The following year, Harford was forced to close the program due to lack of funding. The discontinuation of the football program was met with heavy opposition by students, who signed many petitions to bring the program back. However, proper funding never came in later, and the sports program still has had to remain closed for 29 years.

Field Hockey

Harford ran an extremely successful field hockey program for women from 1975 to 2000. The program won the national championship in 1995, Harford's first national championship. NJCAA field hockey was discontinued in 1997. Harford started playing National Collegiate Athletic Association (NCAA) Division II and Division III schools, even some Division I Junior Varsity teams to try to keep the field hockey program alive. In 2000, after 3 years of strain, the program was forced to shut down.

Lacrosse

Harford's women's lacrosse team, led by head coach Nikki Murphy, won its first NJCAA Division I National Championship in program history on May 19, 2019.

Harford Men's Lacrosse won their first NJCAA title in 2023 with a win over Nassau to cap a 12-0 season.

=== Flight Night ===
"Flight Night" is the name of the athletic rivalry between the HCC "Fighting Owls" and the Hagerstown Community College "Hawks" of western Maryland's Washington County. It is an all-sports based rivalry.

For a school to be the winner of the competition, it must accumulate at least 5.5 points. The point is awarded to the team that wins the season series in the head-to-head competition. If the team plays head-to-head once in a given season, then the school that wins will receive the point. If it is a tie, each team receives a one-half point. All regular season head-to-head games count toward the season series tally with the school that wins more games receiving the point. If the teams split the regular season matchups, then each team receives a one-half point.

In the event of an overall tie, the school that won the previous year will retain the trophy.

== Media ==
The school's newspaper is "The Owl" magazine, which is published twice during the fall and spring semesters.

HCC hosts WHFC, an FM radio station that serves the metro Baltimore area to the southwest, as well as southern Pennsylvania to the north. It is set in the variety format, with shows ranging from jazz, to alternative music, to talk show.

== Facilities ==
=== APG Federal Credit Union Arena ===
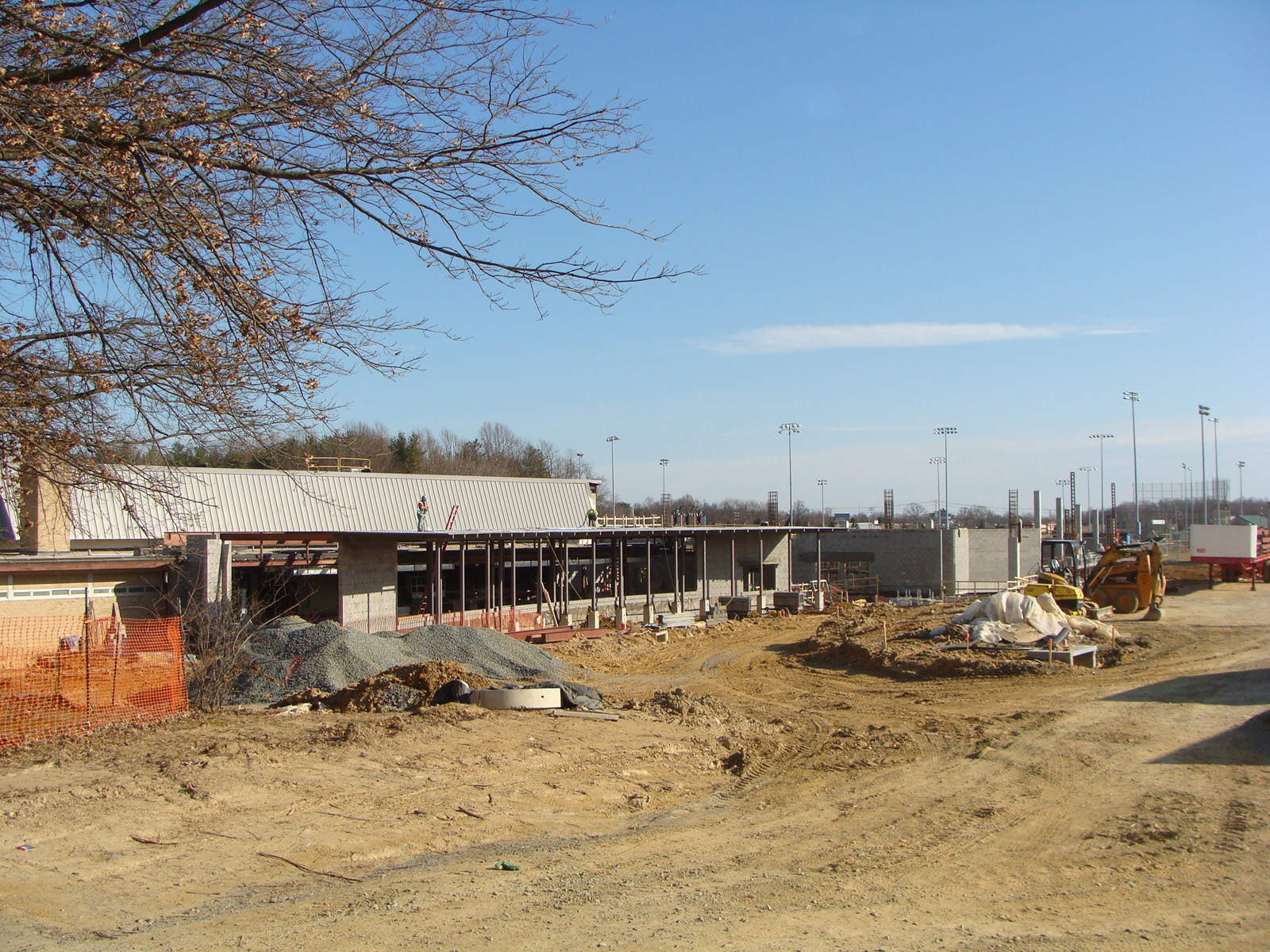
Construction in February 2012

APG Federal Credit Union Arena, originally known as the Susquehanna Center, is an indoor arena at Harford Community College in Bel Air, Maryland. It hosts indoor sports for HCC's Fighting Owls programs, community and regional events, commencements, concerts, special events, student services, fundraising activities, meetings, conferences and trade shows. Capacity for sports events has been listed at 2,552, with up to 3,400 seats for indoor floor events such as concerts. Administration offices for the Athletic Department, locations for fitness classes, such as martial arts and yoga, as well as a swimming pool are located here.

The original Susquehanna Center was a 49,150 ft² indoor athletic complex featuring a multi-purpose gymnasium, fitness center, dance studio, 25-yard swimming pool with grandstand, locker rooms, and offices for Harford sports. It was gutted in Summer 2011 to make way for extensive renovations and the construction of the new arena. Total size of the finished facility with arena will be 86,610 ft²; a groundbreaking ceremony for the new facility was held on August 23, 2011.

On February 27, 2012, it was announced that APG Federal Credit Union had bought the naming rights for the facility for $50,000 annually over 15 years.

=== Harford Sports Complex ===
Harford Sports Complex, formerly Thomas Run Park, is a multi-purpose sports park in Bel Air, Harford County, Maryland, owned and operated by Harford Community College. It consists of one lit all-grass regulation baseball field, one turf infield/grass outfield regulation baseball field, two lit 'skin' softball fields, a concession pavilion, stadium, basketball courts, and lit tennis courts. The complex is also occasionally used by Harford Technical High School as well as other area high schools, and by community adult baseball and softball teams.

The baseball complex was home to the Atlantic League Aberdeen Arsenal baseball team in 2000, before the Aberdeen IronBirds moved to the completed Ripken Stadium in 2002. The expanded field had a capacity of about 2,000, which has since been dismantled back down to the original bleachers and walkways.

=== Harford Stadium ===
Harford Stadium is a 1,000 seat soccer and lacrosse stadium. Constructed in 1968, a 2007 renovation eliminated a track, and now features an artificial turf field, lights, and press pavilion.

=== Other notable buildings ===
The HCC Library is located in the center of campus.

Also in the center of the campus is the Chesapeake Center which hosts the "Chesapeake Gallery", a collection of artwork from emerging and established artists as well as students and faculty, as well the "Chesapeake Theater", a theater venue utilized by the "Phoenix Festival Theater Company".

To the north is the Joppa Hall, which houses the "Joppa Recital Hall", used for musical recitals, and the "Blackbox Theatre", an additional theater venue utilized by the "HCC Actors Guild" and the "Harford Dance Theater Company".

Darlington Hall, opened in 2014, is HCC's central hub for students pursuing nursing and allied health degrees and certificates.

== Notable alumni ==
- William H. Amoss - former Maryland State Senator
- Jason C. Gallion (born 1977), Maryland state senator
- James M. Harkins - former County Executive for Harford County, current director of Maryland Environmental Services
- Steve Matthews - former pro football quarterback in the National Football League, for the Kansas City Chiefs, Jacksonville Jaguars and the Tennessee Oilers, later the Titans, (previously the Houston Oilers), 1994–1998.
- Randy McMillan - former pro football running back in the National Football League, playing his entire career for his "home team", the old Baltimore Colts, and later was forced to move with the team by owner Bob Irsay in March 1984, becoming the Indianapolis Colts, 1981 to 1986.

== Miscellaneous ==
More students transfer to Towson University, a state public university to the southwest in Towson, Maryland of neighboring Baltimore County than any other college. T.U. is the second largest university in the state after the University of Maryland at College Park.

The mascot for HCC is "Screech," the "Fighting Owl."

== Gallery ==
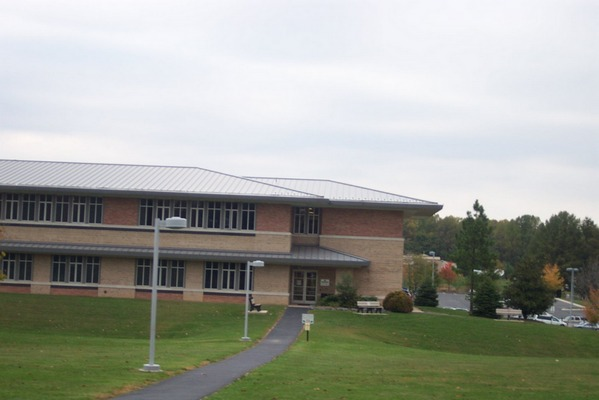
Edgewood Hall

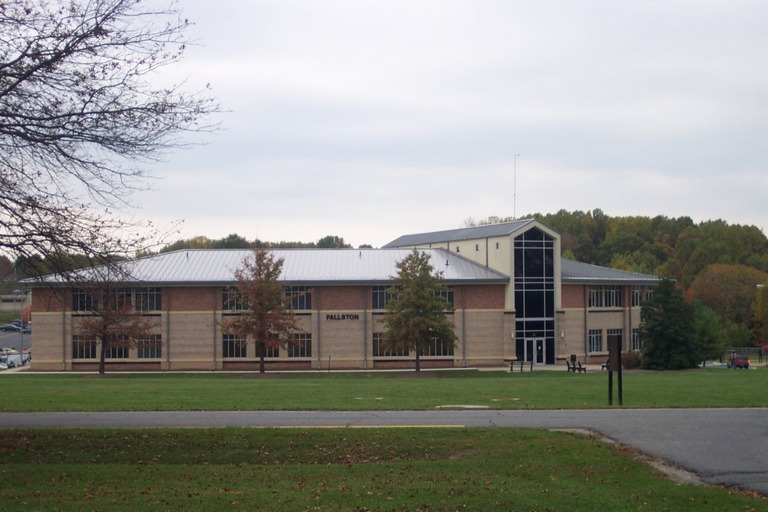
Fallston Hall
