= Donna Stifler =

American politician

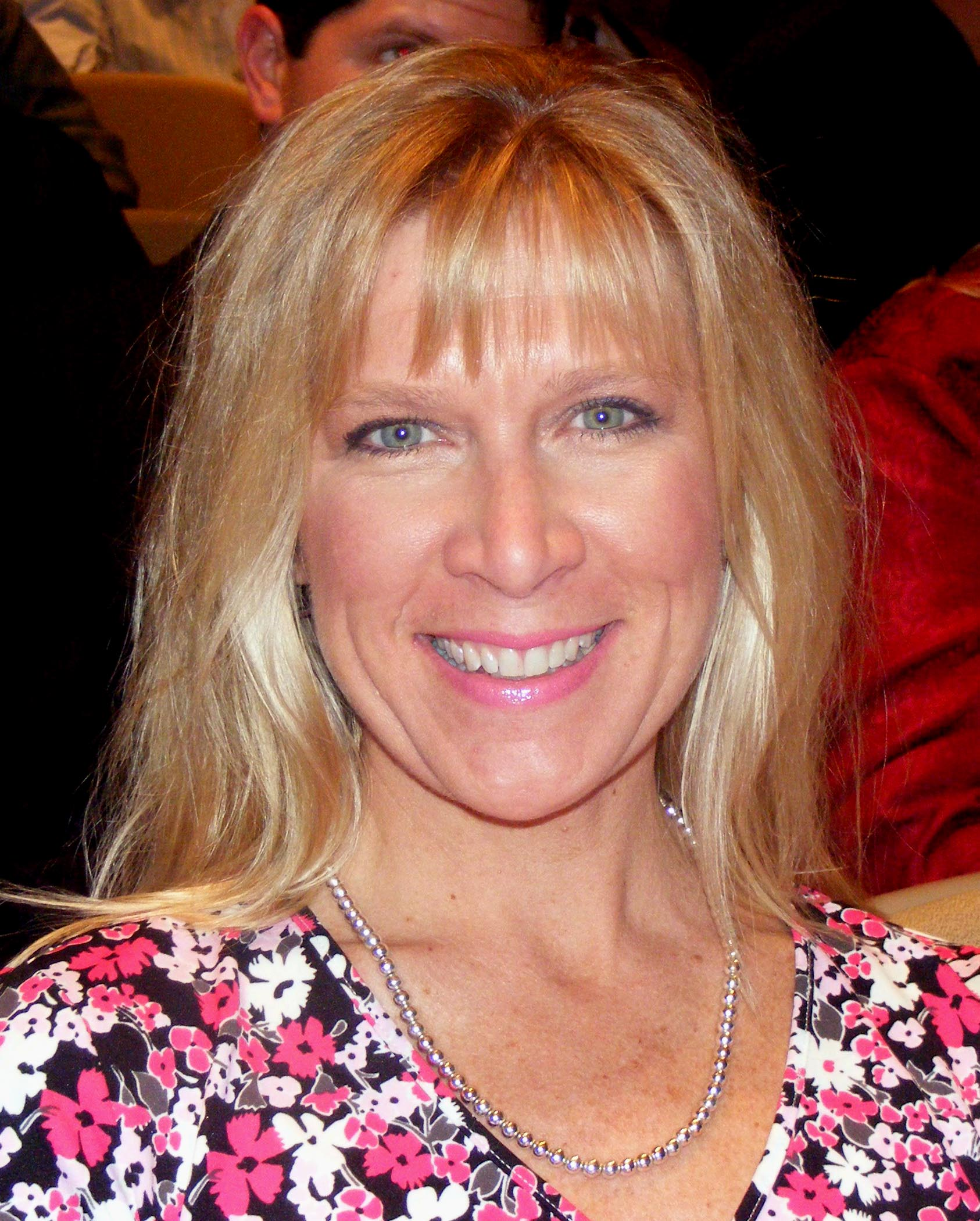

Member of the Maryland House of Delegates from the 35A district
- In office January 10, 2007 – January 14, 2015
- Preceded by: Joanne Parrott

Personal details
- Born: February 24, 1965 (age 61) Baltimore, Maryland
- Party: Republican

Donna Stifler (born February 24, 1965) is an American politician who was elected to the Maryland House of Delegates, representing District 35A, Harford County in 2006 after defeating incumbent Joanne Parrott.

== Education ==
Stifler attend Bel Air High School. She earned her B.S. from North Carolina State University in 1987.

== Career ==
After college, Stifler was a pharmaceutical sales representative and also a fifth grade teacher. She is the founder and director of the Bel Air High School Foundation.

She is a member of several organizations including Harford Habitat for Humanity, Harford County Republican Women, the Republican Club of Harford County and the Harford County Chamber of Commerce.

=== Legislative Notes ===
- voted against in-state tuition for illegal immigrants in 2007 (HB6)
- voted against the Clean Indoor Air Act of 2007 (HB359)

== Election results ==
- 2006 Race for Maryland House of Delegates – District 35A

Voters to choose two:

Name	Votes	Percent	Outcome
Barry Glassman, Rep.	21,766	40.1%	Won
Donna Stifler, Rep.	18,909	34.8%	Won
Craig H. DeRan, Dem.	13,589	25.0%	Lost
Other Write-Ins	81	0.1%	
