= Maryland House of Delegates District 35A =

American legislative district

Maryland's legislative district 35A
- Represents parts of Cecil County and Harford County
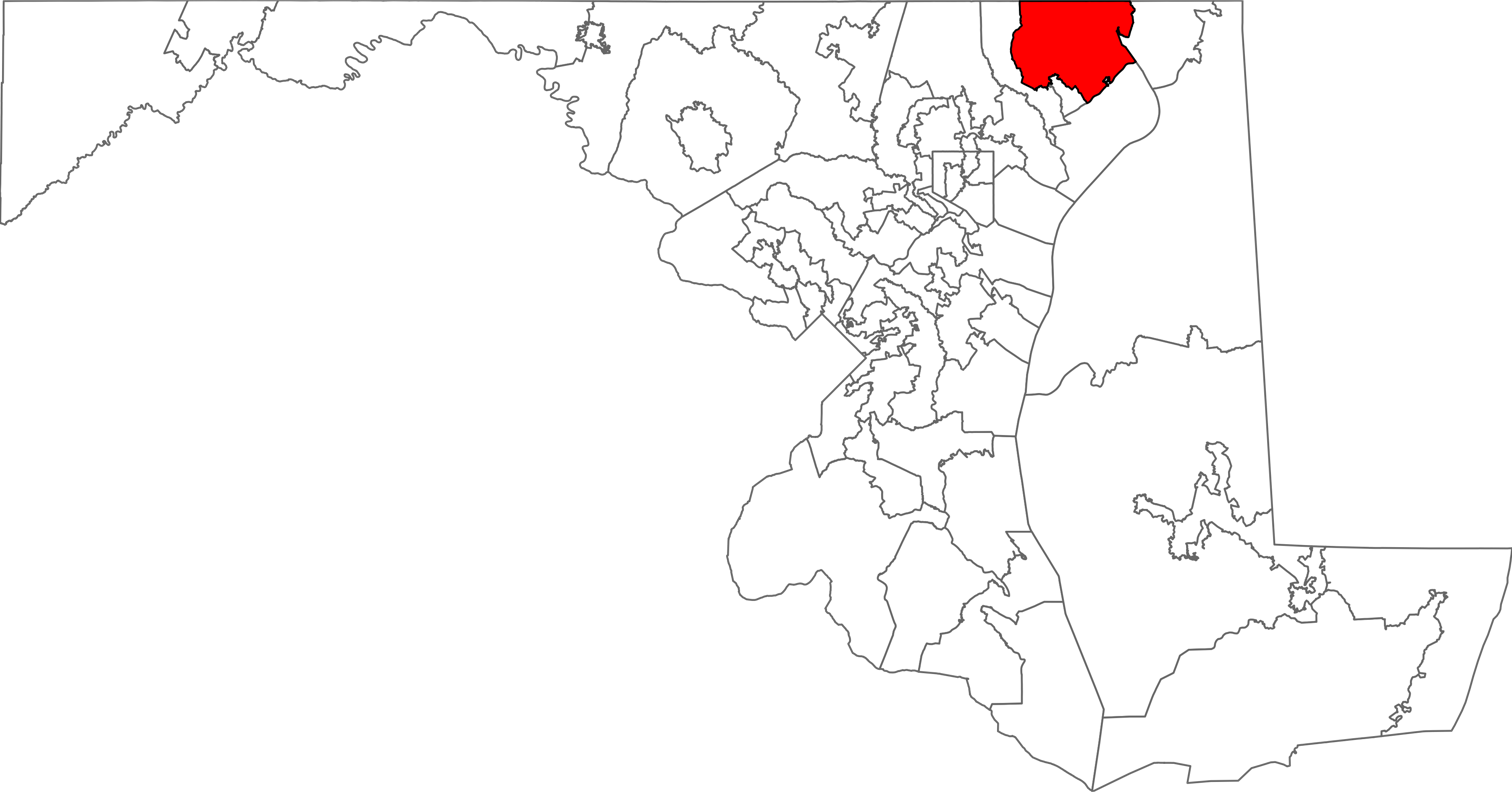
- Delegate(s): Mike Griffith (R); Teresa E. Reilly (R)
- Registration: 43.8% Republican; 32.4% Democratic; 22.0% unaffiliated
- Demographics: 81.3% White; 7.7% Black/African American; 0.3% Native American; 1.2% Asian; 0.0% Hawaiian/Pacific Islander; 1.9% Other race; 7.6% Two or more races; 5.2% Hispanic
- Population (2020): 45,011
- Voting-age population: 35,002
- Registered voters: 29,615

Maryland House of Delegates District 35A is one of the 71 districts that compose the Maryland House of Delegates. Along with subdistrict 35B, it makes up the 35th district of the Maryland Senate. District 35A includes parts of Cecil County and Harford County, and is represented by two delegates.

== History ==
The constituency of District 35A was part of Cecil County and was represented by one delegate up until the 2020 United States redistricting cycle when its constituency changed to parts of Cecil County and Harford County and gained a second delegate.

== Demographic characteristics ==
As of the 2020 United States census, the district had a population of 45,011, of whom 35,002 (77.8%) were of voting age. The racial makeup of the district was 36,581 (81.3%) White, 3,453 (7.7%) African American, 143 (0.3%) Native American, 528 (1.2%) Asian, 21 (0.0%) Pacific Islander, 875 (1.9%) from some other race, and 3,420 (7.6%) from two or more races. Hispanic or Latino of any race were 2,345 (5.2%) of the population.

The district had 29,615 registered voters as of October 17, 2020, of whom 6,516 (22.0%) were registered as unaffiliated, 12,967 (43.8%) were registered as Republicans, 9,608 (32.4%) were registered as Democrats, and 305 (1.0%) were registered to other parties.

== Past Election Results ==
=== 1986 ===
Name	Party	Votes	Percent	Outcome
Joseph Lutz	Democratic	10,093	31.0%	Won
William A. Clark	Republican	8,855	27.0%	Won
Dorothy Polek Stancill	Republican	7,736	24.0%	Lost
Edwin E. Hess	Democratic	5,568	17.0%	Lost

=== 1990 ===
Name	Party	Votes	Percent	Outcome
James M. Harkins	Republican	10,122	29.0%	Won
Donald C. Fry	Democratic	8,791	25.0%	Won
Dorothy Polek Stancill	Republican	8,594	24.0%	Lost
Joseph Lutz	Democratic	7,946	22.0%	Lost

=== 1994 ===
Name	Party	Votes	Percent	Outcome
James M. Harkins	Republican	18,655	36.0%	Won
Donald C. Fry	Democratic	14,458	28.0%	Won
James F. Greenwell	Republican	10,443	20.0%	Lost
Joseph Lutz	Democratic	7,858	15.0%	Lost

=== 1998 ===
Name	Party	Votes	Percent	Outcome
Barry Glassman	Republican	17,998	32.0%	Won
Joanne S. Parrott	Republican	14,963	26.0%	Won
Michael G. Comeau	Democratic	13,250	23.0%	Lost
Lee D. McDaniel	Democratic	10,291	18.0%	Lost

=== 2002 ===
Name	Party	Votes	Percent	Outcome
Joanne S. Parrott	Republican	22,801	50.0%	Won
Barry Glassman	Republican	22,463	49.2%	Won
Other Write-Ins		387	0.9%	

=== 2006 ===
Name	Party	Votes	Percent	Outcome
Barry Glassman	Republican	21,766	40.1%	Won
Donna Stifler	Republican	18,909	34.8%	Won
Craig H. DeRan	Democratic	13,589	25.0%	Lost
Other Write-Ins		81	0.1%	

=== 2010 ===
Name	Party	Votes	Percent	Outcome
Donna Stifler	Republican	24,058	38.0%	Won
H. Wayne Norman Jr.	Republican	23,819	37.6%	Won
John W. Jones	Democratic	8,502	13.4%	Lost
Joseph J. Gutierrez	Democratic	6,867	10.8%	Lost
Other Write-Ins		111	0.2%	

=== 2014 ===
Name	Party	Votes	Percent	Outcome
Kevin Hornberger	Republican	6,225	56.5%	Won
David D. Rudolph	Democratic	4,778	43.4%	Lost
Mary Catherine Podlesak (as write-in)	Republican	10	0.1%	Lost
Other Write-Ins		3	0.0%	

=== 2018 ===
Name	Party	Votes	Percent	Outcome
Kevin Hornberger	Republican	9,065	63.2%	Won
Jobeth Rocky Bowers	Democratic	5,260	36.7%	Lost
Other Write-Ins		11	0.1%	
