= Aberdeen Arsenal =

Former baseball team in Maryland

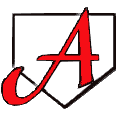
- Logo

Information
- League: Atlantic League (2000)
- Location: Bel Air, Harford County, Maryland
- Ballpark: Thomas Run Park
- Founded: 1999
- Disbanded: 2000
- League championships: 0
- Division championships: 0
- Former name: Aberdeen Arsenal (2000)
- Colors: Orange, black, white

The Aberdeen Arsenal were an Atlantic League team based in Bel Air, Maryland. For the 2000 season, they played in the Atlantic League of Professional Baseball, which was not affiliated with Major League Baseball. The Arsenal departed from Aberdeen to make room for the Aberdeen IronBirds, the A affiliate of the Baltimore Orioles owned by Cal Ripken Jr.

The Arsenal played at Thomas Run Park, on the campus of Harford Community College.

The Arsenal are the subject of NPR broadcaster Neal Conan's book, Play By Play: Baseball, Radio, and Life in the Last Chance League.
