= Bel Air High School (Bel Air, Maryland) =

Location
- 100 Heighe Street; Bel Air, Maryland 21014; United States; 39°31′50″N 76°20′51″W

Information
- Type: Public Secondary
- Established: 1815; 211 years ago
- School district: Harford County Public Schools
- Principal: Robert Deleva
- Grades: 9–12
- Enrollment: 1,489 (2022)
- Campus: Suburban
- Colors: Blue, White
- Mascot: Bobcat
- Newspaper: The Bellarion
- Website: https://bahs.hcpsschools.org/o/bahs
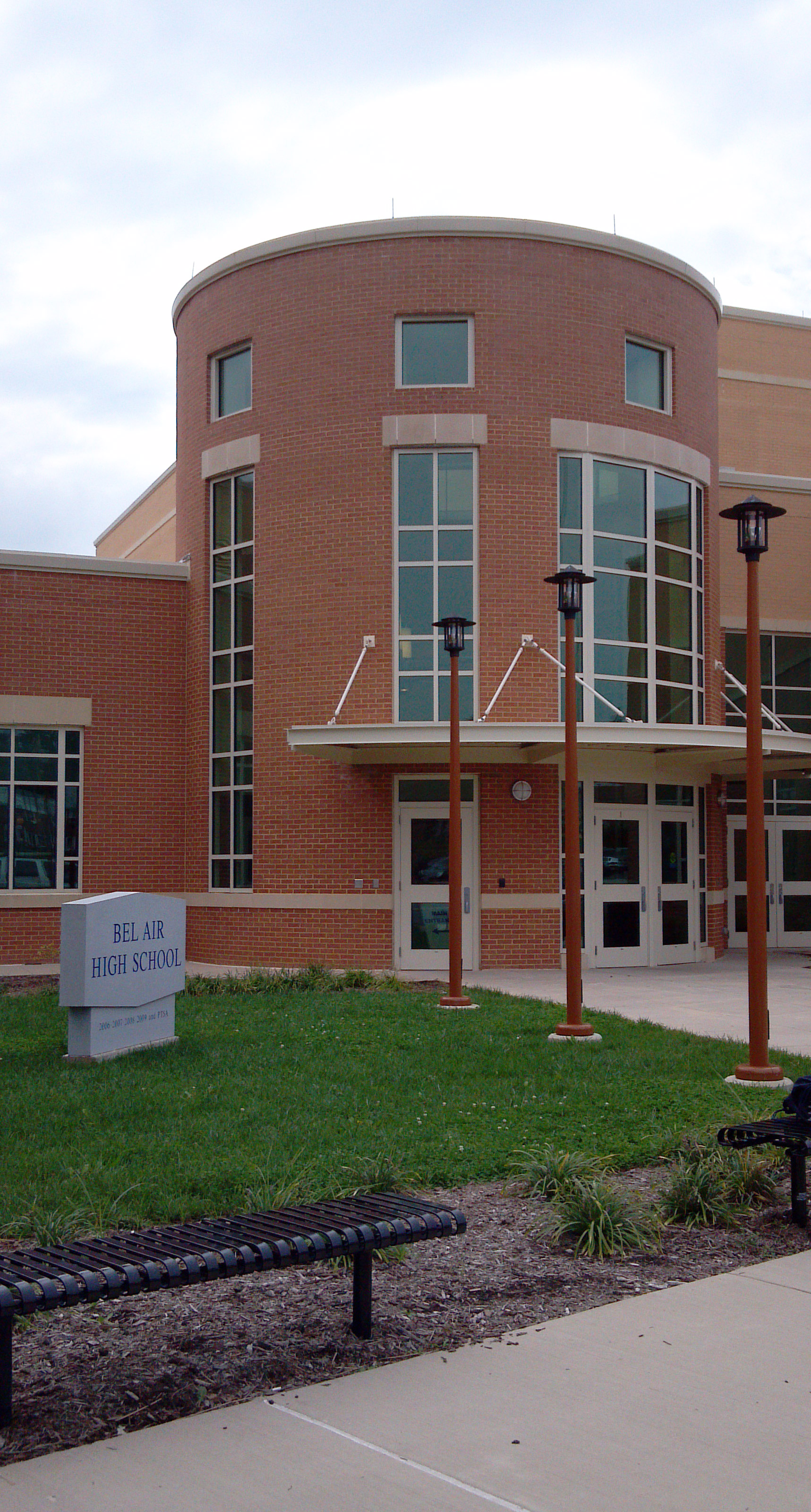
- Entrance to the new (2009) building

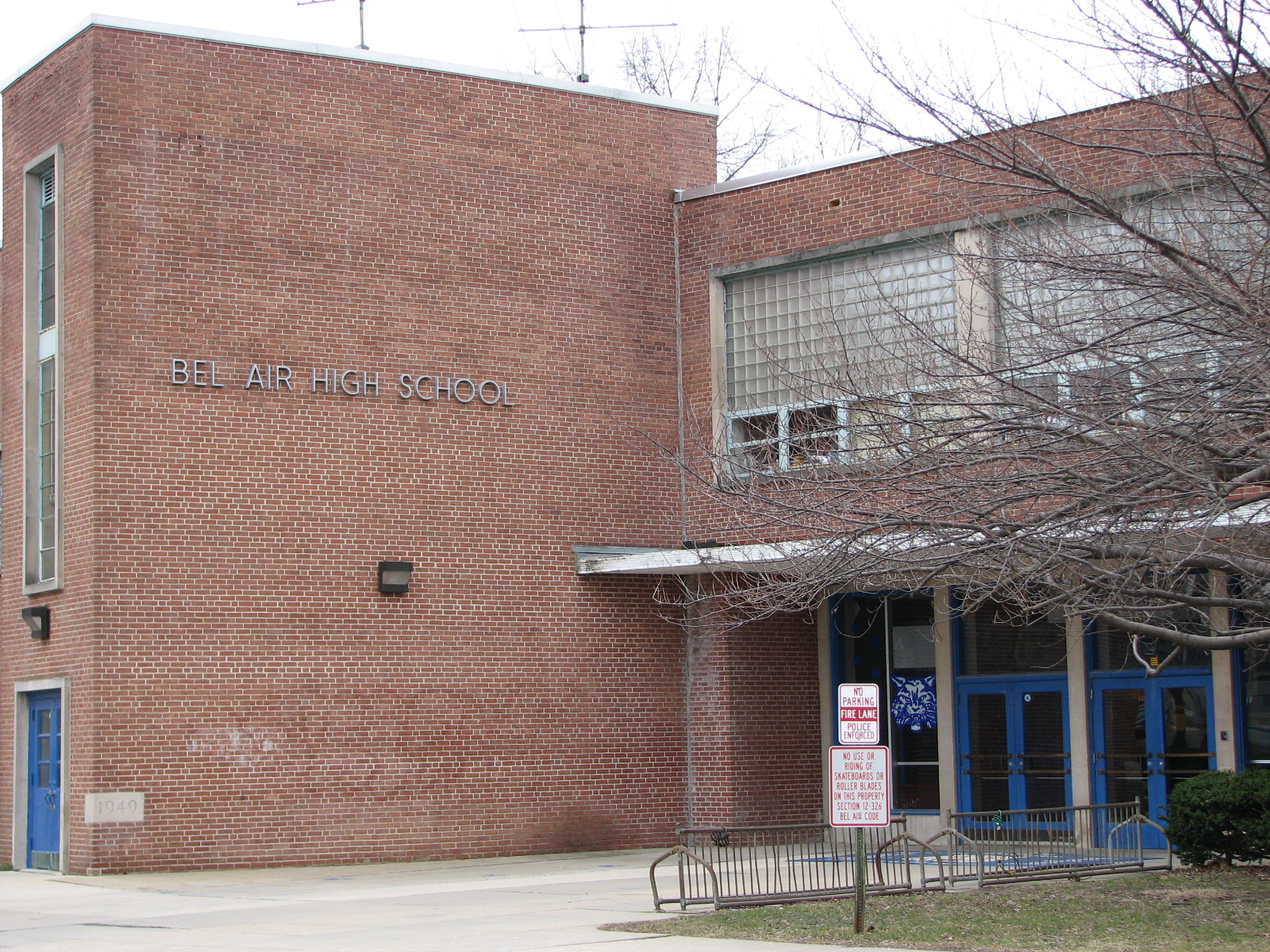
- Entrance to the previous (1950) building

Bel Air High School is a high school in Bel Air, Harford County, Maryland, United States. The current building opened in 2009, though the school's antecedents date back to 1815. It ranks as the #2 High School in Harford County and #98 in Maryland overall.

== History ==
Bel Air High School began as the Harford County Academy when it was formed by an act of the Maryland General Assembly in 1811. The first school building was a stuccoed stone building built at 24 E. Pennsylvania Avenue, and the name was soon changed to the Bel Air Academy in 1815.

In 1867, while the Bel Air Academy was operating independently, a one-room wooden schoolhouse was constructed on Main Street, serving as the county's primary public school.

In 1882, a brick public school was built at 45 East Gordon Street. The school was renamed the Bel Air Academy and Graded School as the old academy merged with the public school system. This building housed classes for all students above the third grade. Additions to the building were made in 1897 and 1910. This building became solely a grade school in 1924 and headquartered the Harford County Board of Education after 1951.

Bel Air High School, named thus for the first time, was established in 1907, and classes were initially held at the Gordon Street building and the Pennsylvania Avenue building.

The past facility at 100 Heighe Street was opened in 1950, with additional renovations made in 1954, 1968, and 1983. The building had a design capacity of 1,423 students; as a result, 11 "portables" were in use to provide additional classroom space.

The current Bel Air High School building was constructed in 2009, adjacent to the old high school on Heighe Street, which was subsequently demolished. Some new features of the school are its auditorium/stage, cafeteria, library, and multiple sports facilities, including Bobcat Stadium, part of which is on the site of the previous high school.

== Students ==
The student body over time:

Year Students
2022 – 1,489
2018 – 1,544
2017 – 1,564
2012 – 1,647
2011 – 1,574
2010 – 1,431
2009 – 1,380
2008 – 1,403
2007 – 1,683
2005 – 1,636
2004 – 1,647
2003 – 1,573
2002 – 1,573
2001 – 1,587
2000 – 1,555
1999 – 1,524
1998 – 1,440
1997 – 1,383
1996 – 1,312
1995 – 1,295
1994 – 1,272
1993 – 1,238

== Notable alumni ==
- Andrew Berry, General Manager of the Cleveland Browns
- John Wilkes Booth, Actor, assassinated President Abraham Lincoln
- James H. Broumel (died 1948), Maryland delegate
- Richard Cassilly, Metropolitan Opera NYC
- William A. Clark, former Maryland Delegate (1983–1990)
- Joseph H. Deckman, elected to National Lacrosse Hall of Fame in 1965.
- Donald C. Fry, former Maryland Senator and Delegate.
- William C. Greer (died 2001), Maryland delegate
- James M. Harkins, former Maryland Delegate (1990-1998), Harford County Executive (1998-2005), & leader of Maryland Environmental Services (2005–present).
- W. Dale Hess (1930–2016), Maryland delegate
- J. Robert Hooper, Maryland State Senator (1936 - 2008)
- Julienne Irwin Finalist on the NBC show America's Got Talent
- Walter R. McComas (1879–1922), Maryland delegate and state's attorney
- Winton B. Osborne (died 1998), Maryland delegate and businessman
- Donna Stifler, Delegate for District 35A
- Robert Shek, former college and professional lacrosse player elected to the National Lacrosse Hall of Fame in 2016
- Brandon Scott Jones, class of 2002, actor, writer, comedian

== Controversy ==
=== Scrabble Day ===
In early October 2017, a group of Bel Air High School students posed and spelled out a racial slur across their chests. The incident led to serious criticism of the school's policies from parents and organizations, including the Harford County chapter of the NAACP. After the incident, a Change.org petition was formed calling for "Zero Tolerance for Racism in the School."
