= James M. Harkins =

American politician

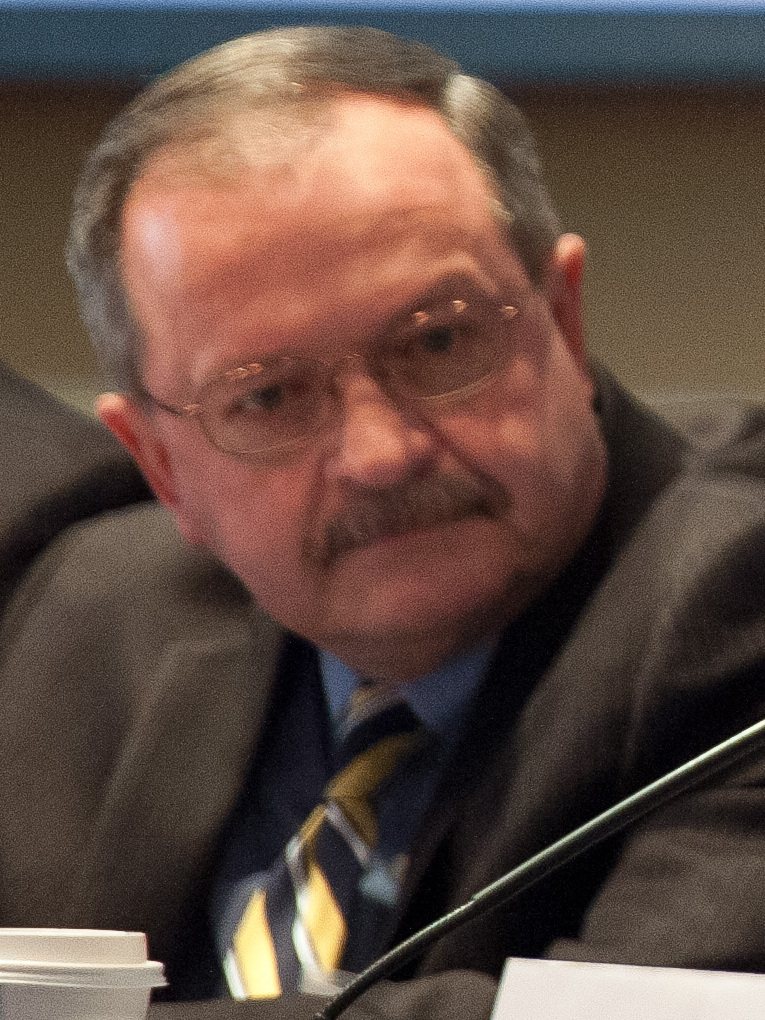
- Harkins in 2013

5th Harford County Executive
- In office December 1998 – June 2005
- Preceded by: Eileen M. Rehrmann
- Succeeded by: David R. Craig

Member of the Maryland House of Delegates from the 35A district
- In office 1991–1998
- Preceded by: Joseph Lutz & William A. Clark
- Succeeded by: Barry Glassman & Joanne S. Parrott

Director of the Maryland Environmental Service
- In office 2005–2016
- Preceded by: James W. Peck
- Succeeded by: John O'Neill Jr. (acting)

Personal details
- Born: December 29, 1953 (age 72) Havre de Grace, Maryland
- Party: Republican

James Harkins (born December 29, 1953) is an American politician who served as Director of Maryland Environmental Services from 2005 until March 2016. He also is a former Harford County Executive and Delegate for District 35A. In December 2019, Maryland Governor Larry Hogan appointed Harkins to the University of Maryland Medical System board of directors.

== Education ==
Harkins attended Bel Air High School. He received his A.A. from Harford Community College.

== Career ==
Harkins joined the Harford County Sheriff's Office and was eventually promoted to sergeant. He was awarded Police Officer of the Year - Harford County by the Baltimore Sun in 1981 and Deputy of the Year, Harford County Sheriff's Department, 1981.

He chaired the Republican Central Committee, Harford County, 1987–90. In 1996, he was elected as Delegate, Republican Party National Convention, 1996, 2000, 2004.

In 1998, Harkins was elected as Harford County Executive. He served in this office until June 30, 2005 when Governor Robert Ehrlich appointed him to be Director of Maryland Environmental Service.

== Election results ==
- 1994 Race for Maryland House of Delegates – District 35A

Voters to choose two:

Name	Votes	Percent	Outcome
James M. Harkins, Rep.	18,655	36%	Won
Donald C. Fry, Dem.	14,458	28%	Won
James F. Greenwell, Rep.	10,443	20%	Lost
Joseph Lutz, Dem.	7,858	15%	Lost

- 1990 Race for Maryland House of Delegates – District 35A

Voters to choose two:

Name	Votes	Percent	Outcome
James M. Harkins, Rep.	10,122	29%	Won
Donald C. Fry, Dem.	8,791	25%	Won
James A. Adkins, Rep.	8,594	24%	Lost
Joseph Lutz, Dem.	7,946	22%	Lost
