= Gabe Alberro =

American writer

- Born: March 31, 1976 (age 49); Miami, Florida
- Occupations: Artist, songwriter and filmmaker

Gabriel J. Alberro (born March 31, 1976) is an American underground artist, writer, songwriter, and filmmaker. He was born in Miami, Florida, and began his indie career writing short stories and poems and making his own comic books.

Alberro served as writer, artist and vocalist of the classic rock hip hop band UBNAWKSHIS (sounded Obnoxious) in its various incarnations from 2000 to 2010.

== Credits ==
- Theme song for "Up Beat" for mun2 (2004) Titled "Dat B Me"
- Featured in "Underground Uncut Volume 1" out of Seattle (2005)
- Music and video featured prominently on "Chronic Candy" soundtrack and DVD on Universal out of Los Angeles
- Music and video featured in "Chicks N Whipz" (Las Vegas, Nevada) (2006)
- Featured in Ozone Magazine (Orlando, Fl.) & Soul Revolution Magazine "Fear in Loathing" Album Featured (San Diego, Ca.)
- Featured in Las Vegas Weekly praising band "Ubnawkshis" and Gabe Alberro's Artwork
- Featured on several mixed tapes including 'Live from Hell Volume 1' hosted by DJ EFN and several mix tapes circulating in Los Angeles, New York and in the United Kingdom.
- Featured on several internet talk shows including 'The Hip Hop Entrepreneur' and "Joe Mafia Presents..."

Featured on The Roof and 100% Proof on MUN2

- 2010 Underground Rapper of the year LVJP
