= Donald C. Fry =

American politician

Member of the Maryland Senate from the 35th district
- In office 1997–1999
- Preceded by: William H. Amoss
- Succeeded by: J. Robert Hooper

Member of the Maryland House of Delegates from the 35A district
- In office 1991–1997
- Preceded by: Joseph Lutz & William A. Clark
- Succeeded by: Michael G. Comeau

Personal details
- Born: June 23, 1955 Killeen, Texas
- Party: Democratic

Donald Fry (born June 23, 1955) is a former member of the Maryland House of Delegates and the Maryland State Senate.

== Background ==
Fry was a member of the Maryland Senate from 1997–99, representing District 35, which covers Harford and Cecil Counties. He was defeated in 1998 by Republican J. Robert Hooper.

Prior to being appointed as a state senator, Fry was a member of the Maryland House of Delegates representing District 35A, which only covered Harford County. He was first elected in 1990, along with Republican Jim Harkins. Both men were elected to replace incumbents Democrat Joseph Lutz, who was defeated in the general election, and one time Republican William A. Clark, who was defeated by Fry in the Democratic primary.

On November 12, 1997, Governor Parris Glendening appointed Donald Fry to replace Democrat William H. Amoss, who died on October 8, 1997. In the succeeding election during 1998, Fry was defeated by Republican challenger J. Robert Hooper, who garnered 55% of the vote.

== Education ==
Fry graduated from Bel Air High School in Bel Air, MD. He received his B.S. from Frostburg State College in 1977 and his J.D. from the University of Baltimore School of Law in 1979.

== Career ==
Fry has been a practicing attorney since becoming a member of the Maryland State and Harford County Bar Associations . He was a member of the Democratic Central Committee of Harford County from 1980 until 1982, then again from 1986 until 1990, serving as chair from 1986 until 1990.

In addition to his political and legal work, Fry was a member of the Board of Directors for the American Red Cross, Northeastern District, from 1984 until 1989, serving as chair from 1986 until 1989. Also, he was the President of the Bel Air Jaycees in 1983. In 1988, Donald Fry was named as one of Ten Outstanding Young Marylanders by Maryland Jaycees.

As a member of the Maryland House of Delegates, Donald fry was a member of the Ways and Means Committee, the Appropriations Committee and many subcommittees. Also, he was the chair of the Harford County Delegation in 1992, and again from 1995 until 1997.

During Fry's short tenure as a member of the Maryland State Senate, he was a member of the Budget and Taxation Committee, Joint Audit Committee, and the Joint Subcommittee on Program Open Space and Agricultural Land Preservation.

Since being defeated as State Senator, Donald Fry is now the President of the Greater Baltimore Committee , a group that works to improve the business climate for the Baltimore region.

== Election results ==
- 1998 Race for Maryland State Senate – 35th District

Voters to choose one:

| Name | Votes | Percent | Outcome |
|---|---|---|---|
| J. Robert Hooper, Rep. | 22,741 | 55% | Won |
| Donald C. Fry, Dem. | 18,370 | 45% | Lost |

- 1994 Race for Maryland House of Delegates – District 35A

Voters to choose two:

| Name | Votes | Percent | Outcome |
|---|---|---|---|
| James M. Harkins, Rep. | 18,655 | 36% | Won |
| Donald C. Fry, Dem. | 14,458 | 28% | Won |
| James F. Greenwell, Rep. | 10,443 | 20% | Lost |
| Joseph Lutz, Dem. | 7,858 | 15% | Lost |

- 1990 Race for Maryland House of Delegates – District 35A

Voters to choose two:

| Name | Votes | Percent | Outcome |
|---|---|---|---|
| James M. Harkins, Rep. | 10.122 | 29% | Won |
| Donald C. Fry, Dem. | 8,791 | 25% | Won |
| James A. Adkins, Rep. | 8,594 | 24% | Lost |
| Joseph Lutz, Dem. | 7,946 | 22% | Lost |
