= Joanne S. Parrott =

American politician (1940–2009)

Member of the Maryland House of Delegates from the 35A district
- In office January 13, 1999 – January 10, 2007
- Preceded by: Michael G. Comeau & James M. Harkins
- Succeeded by: Donna Stifler

Personal details
- Born: Joanne S. Kreider; September 11, 1940 Ephrata, Pennsylvania, U.S.
- Died: March 4, 2009 (aged 68) Fallston, Maryland, U.S.
- Party: Republican

Joanne S. Parrott (née Kreider; September 11, 1940 – March 4, 2009) was an American politician from Maryland. She was elected as a member of Maryland House of Delegates, District 35A, which serves Harford County. She won one of two seats, along with Barry Glassman, defeating incumbent Michael G. Comeau and winning the seat left vacant by James M. Harkins, who was elected as Harford County Executive. She served for about 8 years before being defeated in the Republican Primary by challenger Donna Stifler in 2006.

== Early life ==
Joanne S. Kreider was born on September 11, 1940, in Ephrata, Pennsylvania, to Anna H. and Jacob B. Kreider. She graduated from Ephrata High School. After high school she attended the Peabody Conservatory of Music and Gettysburg College in Pennsylvania.

== Career ==
Parrott spent much of her early career in advertising. She was a member of the Maryland Association of Counties from 1986–98, the United Way of Central Maryland from 1987–91, among others. She also served as an alternate delegate to the Republican Party National Convention in 1992. She was a member of the Harford County Council from 1986 - 1998 serving as President from 1994 - 1998.

She was the co-founder and president of the board of The Highlands School, Inc. She received the Outstanding Woman of the Year award from the Women's Club of Greater Fallston in 1984. She received the Virginia Scotten Award from the Harford County Republican Central Committee in 1987. Finally, she was an Honorary Chair, March of Dimes - Walk America, 1996-98. She was named one of Maryland's Top 100 Women by the Daily Record in 2003.

== Personal life ==
Parrott married E. Bruce Parrott. They had two children, Scott and Jennifer. Her husband predeceased her.

She died on March 4, 2009, at her home in Fallston, Maryland.

== Election results ==
- 2006 Primary Race for Maryland House of Delegates – District 35A

Voters to choose two:

Name	Votes	Percent	Outcome
Barry Glassman, Rep.	5,290	38.6%	Won
Donna Stifler, Rep.	4,639	33.9%	Won
Joanne S. Parrott, Rep.	3,759	27.5%	Lost

- 2002 Race for Maryland House of Delegates – District 35A

Voters to choose two:

Name	Votes	Percent	Outcome
Barry Glassman, Rep.	22,463	49.2%	Won
Joanne S. Parrott, Rep.	22,801	50.0%	Won
Other Write-Ins	387	0.9%	

- 1998 Race for Maryland House of Delegates – District 35A

Voters to choose two:

Name	Votes	Percent	Outcome
Barry Glassman, Rep.	17,998	32%	Won
Joanne S. Parrott, Rep.	14,963	26%	Won
Michael G. Comeau, Dem.	13,250	23%	Lost
Lee D. McDaniel, Dem.	10,291	18%	Lost
