= J. Robert Hooper =

American politician (1936–2008)

James Robert Hooper

Member of the Maryland Senate from the 35th district
- In office January 11, 1999 – December 31, 2007
- Preceded by: Donald C. Fry
- Succeeded by: Barry Glassman

Member of the Harford County Council from District D
- In office 1982–1990
- Preceded by: Lehman W. Spry Jr.
- Succeeded by: Barry Glassman

Personal details
- Born: July 27, 1936 Baltimore, Maryland
- Died: January 24, 2008 (aged 71) Street, Maryland
- Party: Republican
- Spouse: Shirley Hooper

James Robert Hooper (July 27, 1936 – January 24, 2008) was an American politician who served on the Maryland Senate from 1999 to 2007.

== Education ==
Hooper attended Bel Air High School in Bel Air, Maryland.

== Career ==
Hooper owned Harford Sanitation Services, which he founded with his father in 1954 and was operated after his death until its sale by his son, Bobby Ray Hooper and his daughter, Cindy Hushon. He was a member of the Harford County, Aberdeen and Havre de Grace chambers of commerce, as well as the Route 40 Business Association. He also served on the board of directors for the Salvation Army of Harford County from 1986 until his death.

== Political career ==
Hooper served as a member of the Harford County Council from 1982 until 1990. He was elected to the Maryland Senate in 1998. He was sworn in on January 13, 1999, to represent District 35 in Harford County. The hallmark of his work was constituent service.

Hooper announced on November 14, 2007, that he was resigning his Senate seat due to poor health. The resignation took effect on December 31, 2007. He recommended and was replaced by State Delegate Barry Glassman.

Hooper was known among the Senate's pages as Senator "High Five" Hooper because he would walk into session every day and run down the line of pages and give them high-fives; he was even known to do this among his fellow senators. Hooper's way of saying hello at the beginning of a session put a smile on everyone's faces.

Hooper succumbed to colon cancer on January 24, 2008, at his home in Street, Maryland. He was 71 years old.

== Election results ==
- 2006 race for Maryland State Senate – 35th District

Voters to choose three:

Name	Votes	Percent	Outcome
J. Robert Hooper, Rep.	35,760	68.0%	Won
Stan Kollar, Dem.	16,803	31.9%	Lost
Write-ins, other	31	0.3%	Lost

- 2002 race for Maryland State Senate – 35th District

Voters to choose three:

Name	Votes	Percent	Outcome
J. Robert Hooper, Rep.	42,766	98.13%	Won
Write-ins, other	817	1.87%	Lost

- 1998 race for Maryland State Senate – 35th District

Voters to choose three:

Name	Votes	Percent	Outcome
J. Robert Hooper, Rep.	22,741	55%	Won
Donald C. Fry, Dem.	18,370	45%	Lost
