= Michael G. Comeau =

American politician and attorney

Member of the Maryland House of Delegates from the 35A district
- In office November 26, 1997 – January 13, 1999
- Preceded by: Donald C. Fry
- Succeeded by: Barry Glassman & Joanne Parrott

Personal details
- Born: July 13, 1956 (age 70) Baltimore, Maryland
- Party: Democratic

Michael G. Comeau (born July 13, 1956) is an attorney and former member of the Maryland House of Delegates where he represented District 35A. Comeau was appointed to the seat in 1997 due to the resignation of Donald C. Fry and served on the Judiciary Committee. He was elected in 1996 as a Delegate to the Democratic National Convention in Chicago representing the Second Congressional District for Maryland. He was also elected to the Harford County Democratic State Central Committee in 2002 and 2006 and served as Chair from 2003 until 2008 when he was appointed to the Harford County Board of Elections where he served until 2011. Comeau was the Democratic nominee for the Harford County Council, District D, in 2002 and was defeated by Republican Lance C. Miller.

== Education ==
Comeau graduated from Parkville High School in 1974. After high school he attended and graduated from Randolph-Macon College, serving as President of the Class of 1978, and University of Baltimore School of Law in 1981.

== Career ==
Comeau was admitted to the Maryland Bar in 1981, the District of Columbia Bar in 1984 and the Supreme Court of the United States in 1985. From 1989 to 1993 and 2015 to 2017, he served as a Maryland Assistant Attorney General. He was a Chief Solicitor for Baltimore City from 2017 to 2021 before completing the M.S.B.A.'s Mediators Course and being approved by several circuit courts.

Comeau served as a commissioned officer in the Maryland Army National Guard as part of the Judge Advocate General's Corps. After service in Afghanistan as Deputy Staff Judge Advocate for Combined Forces Command-Afghanistan (CFC-A) at Camp Eggers in Kabul in 2005, he retired at the rank of LTC in 2008 with a brevet promotion to COL. He received the Office of the Secretary of Defense Medal for Exceptional Public Service in October 2021 for his service as State Chair of the Maryland Employer Support of the Guard and Reserve Committee (2018-2021).

Comeau was an Assistant County Attorney for Anne Arundel County and Baltimore County, an Associate County Attorney for Prince George's County and a Senior Assistant County Attorney for Harford County, Maryland. The Maryland Trial Courts Judicial Nominating Commission, District Four, nominated Comeau in April 2013 for a vacancy on the Circuit Court for Harford County, Md.

== Election results ==
- 1998 Race for Maryland House of Delegates – District 35A

Voters to choose two:

Name	Votes	Percent	Outcome
Barry Glassman, Rep.	17,998	32%	Won
Joanne S. Parrott, Rep.	14,963	26%	Won
Michael G. Comeau, Dem.	13,250	23%	Lost
Lee D. McDaniel, Dem.	10,291	18%	Lost
