= María Pilar Izquierdo Albero =

Spanish religious sister

Blessed María Pilar Izquierdo Albero

Virgin
- Born: 27 July 1906; Zaragoza, Kingdom of Spain
- Died: 27 August 1945 (aged 39); San Sebastián, Guipúzcoa, Francoist Spain
- Venerated in: Roman Catholic Church
- Beatified: 4 November 2001, Saint Peter's Square by Pope John Paul II
- Feast: 27 August

María Pilar Izquierdo Albero (27 July 1906 – 27 August 1945) was a Spanish religious sister who founded the Missionary Work of Jesus of Mary (1939). Albero founded her order at the end of the Spanish Civil War - when it was safe to do so - after having rallied from a serious form of blindness and paralysis from 1927 to 1939 though her order was later disbanded and restarted again after a series of complications.

Pope John Paul II beatified her in Saint Peter's Square on 4 November 2001.

== Life ==
María Pilar Izquierdo Albero was born in mid-1906 in Zaragoza as the third of five children and her childhood saw her foster an ardent desire to enter the religious life, though future circumstances would hinder her attempts. She was baptized on 5 August 1906.

Albero did not attend school and as a result did not ever learn in her childhood to either read or write. From 1918 until 1920 she was struck with a serious disease and remained confined to her bed for most of that duration in Alfamen until she rallied and began to work at a shoe warehouse to support her parents' financial situation. In 1926 - while returning home from work - Albero fell off a tram and fractured her pelvis while in 1927 she became paraplegic and blind due to an outbreak of cysts on her body. Albero opened her home for persecuted Christians during the Spanish Civil War and around the time it began starting to open up about her ideas in forming a religious order dedicated missionary work. But the ongoing conflict made this a great risk and so she decided to wait until the right time while in the meantime rallying people to join her.

On 8 December 1939 - the Feast of the Immaculate Conception - she was suddenly cured of her blindness and paralysis to which she attributed to the intercession of the Blessed Virgin Mary and began to concretely implement her work; she founded her order formally on 16 November 1939. The order received approval from the diocese on 2 February 1942 as being only that of a "pious union". But difficulties with the order saw the local bishop order that the congregation be disbanded and forbidden to any form of apostolate until 1942 when the bishop approved a second form of its work. She fell ill once more in 1944 and later on 9 November 1944 was travelling to San Sebastián and fractured her leg in a car accident on a snow-covered road.

Albero died on 27 August 1945 due to a malignant tumor. Her congregation went on to receive diocesan approval on 27 July 1961 while later receiving papal approval on 12 October 1981.

== Beatification ==
The beatification process commenced in a diocesan process that opened on 29 December 1983 and then closed on 29 December 1988 after having received the official "nihil obstat" from the Congregation for the Causes of Saints to open the cause - this also titled Albero as a Servant of God. The C.C.S. later validated this diocesan process on 23 October 1992 and received the Positio in 1993 for inspection.

Theologians voiced their assent to the cause on 19 May 2000 with the C.C.S. doing the same on 12 December 2000. Pope John Paul II confirmed that Albero had lived a model life of heroic virtue to a favorable degree and named her as Venerable on 18 December 2000. The process for investigating the miracle needed for her beatification spanned from 3 October 1984 to 3 April 1989 and was validated in Rome on 21 May 1999 before receiving the approval of a medical board on 21 June 2000 and that of theologians on 13 March 2001. The C.C.S. also approved it on 15 May 2001 with papal approval being provided on 7 July 2001 in a move that enabled for Pope John Paul II to preside over Albero's beatification on 4 November 2001.
