= 1990 Maryland House of Delegates election =

- November 6, 1990

All 141 seats in the Maryland House of Delegates 71 seats needed for a majority

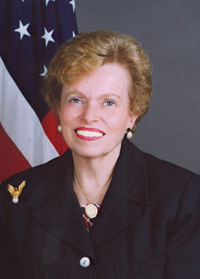
	Majority party	Minority party
Leader	R. Clayton Mitchell Jr.	Ellen Sauerbrey
Party	Democratic	Republican
Leader since	1987	1986
Leader's seat	36th district	10th district
Last election	124	17
Seats won	117	24
Seat change	▼7	▲7
- Results: Democratic gain Republican gain Democratic hold Republican hold
Speaker before election
R. Clayton Mitchell Jr.
Democratic
Elected Speaker
R. Clayton Mitchell Jr.
Democratic

The 1990 Maryland House of Delegates elections were held on November 6, 1990, as part of the 1990 United States elections, including the 1990 Maryland gubernatorial election. All 141 of Maryland's state delegates were up for reelection.

== Retiring incumbents ==
=== Democrats ===
1. District 17: Mary H. Boergers retired to run for state senator in District 17.
2. District 18: Patricia R. Sher retired to run for state senator in District 17.
3. District 22: Anne MacKinnon retired to run for the Prince George's County Council.
4. District 25: Juanita Miller retired to run for state senator in District 25.
5. District 25: Dennis C. Donaldson retired.
6. District 26: Gloria G. Lawlah retired to run for state senator in District 26.
7. District 30: Donald E. Lamb retired.
8. District 32: George Schmincke retired.
9. District 34: Barbara Osborn Kreamer retired to run for Congress in Maryland's 1st congressional district.
10. District 34: Eileen M. Rehrmann retired to run for Harford County Executive.
11. District 36: John M. Ashley Jr. retired.
12. District 38: Shirley W. Pilchard retired.
13. District 40: Ralph M. Hughes retired to run for state senator in District 40.
14. District 46: Donald G. Hammen retired.

=== Republicans ===
1. District 2C: Donald F. Munson retired to run for state senator in District 2.
2. District 31: John R. Leopold retired to run for state senator in District 31.
3. District 34: Richard F. Colburn retired to run for Congress in Maryland's 1st congressional district.

== Incumbents defeated ==
=== In primary elections ===
==== Democrats ====
1. District 6: R. Terry Connelly lost renomination to Leslie E. Hutchinson and incumbents E. Farrell Maddox and Michael H. Weir.
2. District 7: Joseph J. Minnick lost renomination to Connie C. Galiazzo and incumbents John S. Arnick and Louis L. DePazzo.
3. District 18: C. Lawrence Wiser lost renomination to Chris Van Hollen, John Adams Hurson, and incumbent Patricia H. Billings.
4. District 22: M. Teresa O'Hare Johnson lost renomination to Paul G. Pinsky, Anne Healey, and incumbent Richard A. Palumbo.
5. District 24: Carolyn J. B. Howard lost renomination to Joanne C. Benson and incumbents Nathaniel Exum and Sylvania W. Woods Jr.
6. District 28A: Samuel C. Linton lost renomination to Stephen J. Braun and incumbent Michael J. Sprague.
7. District 37: Philip C. Foster lost renomination to Samuel Q. Johnson III, Robert A. Thornton Jr., and Don William Bradley.
8. District 42: David B. Shapiro lost renomination to Delores G. Kelley and incumbents James W. Campbell and Samuel I. Rosenberg.

=== In general elections ===
==== Democrats ====
1. District 3A: Royd R. Smith lost to J. Anita Stup and incumbent James E. McClellan.
2. District 8: William J. Burgess and Donna M. Felling lost to Alfred W. Redmer Jr., James F. Ports Jr., and incumbent Joseph Bartenfelder.
3. District 9: Michael U. Gisriel lost to Gerry L. Brewster and incumbents John J. Bishop and Martha Scanlan Klima.
4. District 13B: Robert J. DiPietro and William C. Bevan lost to Martin G. Madden and John S. Morgan.
5. District 34: William H. Cox Jr. lost to Rose Mary Hatem Bonsack, Mary Louise Preis, and David R. Craig.
6. District 35A: Joseph Lutz lost to Donald C. Fry and James M. Harkins.

== Detailed results ==
All election results are from the Maryland State Board of Elections.

=== District 1A ===
Maryland House of Delegates District 1A election
Party	Candidate	Votes	%
Republican	George C. Edwards (incumbent)	5,506	100.0
Republican hold			

=== District 1B ===
Maryland House of Delegates District 1B election
Party	Candidate	Votes	%
Democratic	Kevin Kelly (incumbent)	11,579	40.9
Democratic	Betty Workman (incumbent)	11,413	40.3
Republican	H. Dolores Chase Morgan	5,321	18.8
Democratic hold			
Democratic hold			

=== District 2A ===
Maryland House of Delegates District 2A election
Party	Candidate	Votes	%
Democratic	Casper R. Taylor Jr. (incumbent)	4,116	65.2
Republican	Robert L. Lewis	2,194	34.8
Democratic hold			

=== District 2B ===
Maryland House of Delegates District 2B election
Party	Candidate	Votes	%
Democratic	Peter G. Callas (incumbent)	4,892	100.0
Democratic hold			

=== District 2C ===
Maryland House of Delegates District 2C election
Party	Candidate	Votes	%
Democratic	John P. Donoghue	2,746	50.3
Republican	Bertrand Iseminger	2,712	49.7
Democratic gain from Republican			

=== District 3A ===
Maryland House of Delegates District 3A election
Party	Candidate	Votes	%
Democratic	Bruce Poole (incumbent)	5,945	94.7
Democratic	Shirley Spencer	333	5.3
Democratic hold			

=== District 3B ===
Maryland House of Delegates District 3B election
Party	Candidate	Votes	%
Republican	J. Anita Stup	9,255	29.4
Democratic	James E. McClellan (incumbent)	8,423	26.8
Democratic	Royd R. Smith (incumbent)	7,959	25.3
Republican	James W. Respess	5,831	18.5
Republican gain from Democratic			
Democratic hold			

=== District 4A ===
Maryland House of Delegates District 4A election
Party	Candidate	Votes	%
Democratic	George Littrell (incumbent)	10,424	36.8
Democratic	Thomas H. Hattery (incumbent)	10,209	36.0
Republican	Seth F. Stein	7,717	27.2
Democratic hold			
Democratic hold			

=== District 4B ===
Maryland House of Delegates District 4B election
Party	Candidate	Votes	%
Republican	Donald B. Elliott (incumbent)	6,061	69.2
Democratic	William D. Henley Sr.	2,695	30.8
Republican hold			

=== District 5A ===
Maryland House of Delegates District 5A election
Party	Candidate	Votes	%
Republican	Richard C. Matthews (incumbent)	13,093	30.4
Democratic	Richard N. Dixon	12,931	30.1
Democratic	Ellen Leahy Willis	10,377	24.1
Republican	Joseph Hooper Mettle	6,620	15.4
Republican hold			
Democratic hold			

=== District 5B ===
Maryland House of Delegates District 5B election
Party	Candidate	Votes	%
Democratic	Lawrence Alan LaMotte (incumbent)	4,339	61.0
Republican	Albert J. Craemer	2,772	39.0
Democratic hold			

=== District 6 ===
Maryland House of Delegates District 6 election
Party	Candidate	Votes	%
Democratic	Leslie E. Hutchinson	10,796	21.1
Democratic	E. Farrell Maddox (incumbent)	10,165	19.9
Democratic	Michael H. Weir (incumbent)	9,778	19.1
Republican	Michael J. Davis	8,565	16.7
Republican	Bruce A. Laing	6,317	12.3
Republican	John Hillstrom	5,554	10.9
Democratic	Deanna Hiltz	5	0.0
Democratic hold			
Democratic hold			
Democratic hold			

=== District 7 ===
Maryland House of Delegates District 7 election
Party	Candidate	Votes	%
Democratic	Connie C. Galiazzo	14,307	26.7
Democratic	Louis L. DePazzo (incumbent)	13,595	25.4
Democratic	John S. Arnick (incumbent)	12,249	22.8
Republican	Patricia Ann Mohorovic	8,079	15.1
Republican	Albert W. Weiss	5,387	10.0
Democratic hold			
Democratic hold			
Democratic hold			

=== District 8 ===
Maryland House of Delegates District 8 election
Party	Candidate	Votes	%
Republican	Alfred W. Redmer Jr.	15,354	18.2
Democratic	Joseph Bartenfelder (incumbent)	14,876	17.6
Republican	James F. Ports Jr.	14,266	16.9
Republican	Kenneth G. Hirsch	14,129	16.8
Democratic	Donna M. Felling (incumbent)	13,006	15.4
Democratic	William J. Burgess (incumbent)	12,680	15.0
Republican	John Michael Fleig	20	0.0
Republican gain from Democratic			
Democratic hold			
Republican gain from Democratic			

=== District 9 ===
Maryland House of Delegates District 9 election
Party	Candidate	Votes	%
Republican	Martha Scanlan Klima (incumbent)	15,461	19.4
Democratic	Gerry L. Brewster	14,876	18.7
Republican	John J. Bishop (incumbent)	14,589	18.3
Democratic	Michael U. Gisriel (incumbent)	14,428	18.1
Democratic	Charles Culbertson	10,522	13.2
Republican	James Holechek	9,855	12.4
Republican hold			
Democratic hold			
Republican hold			

=== District 10 ===
Maryland House of Delegates District 10 election
Party	Candidate	Votes	%
Republican	Ellen Sauerbrey (incumbent)	22,649	24.0
Republican	Bob Ehrlich (incumbent)	22,246	23.6
Republican	Wade Kach (incumbent)	21,225	22.5
Democratic	Ellery B. Woodworth	11,996	12.7
Democratic	Walter Boyd	8,371	8.9
Democratic	Robert L. Curtis Jr.	7,832	8.3
Republican hold			
Republican hold			
Republican hold			

=== District 11 ===
Maryland House of Delegates District 11 election
Party	Candidate	Votes	%
Democratic	Theodore Levin (incumbent)	18,351	27.5
Democratic	Richard Rynd (incumbent)	17,172	25.8
Democratic	Leon Albin (incumbent)	15,795	23.7
Republican	Ella White Campbell	10,303	15.5
Republican	Douglas Harris	5,021	7.5
Democratic hold			
Democratic hold			
Democratic hold			

=== District 12 ===
Maryland House of Delegates District 12 election
Party	Candidate	Votes	%
Democratic	Thomas E. Dewberry (incumbent)	13,924	33.8
Democratic	Louis P. Morsberger (incumbent)	13,716	33.3
Democratic	Kenneth H. Masters (incumbent)	13,553	32.9
Democratic hold			
Democratic hold			
Democratic hold			

=== District 13A ===
Maryland House of Delegates District 13A election
Party	Candidate	Votes	%
Democratic	Virginia M. Thomas (incumbent)	8,242	71.5
Republican	James Douglas Morgan	3,292	28.5
Democratic hold			

=== District 13B ===
Maryland House of Delegates District 13B election
Party	Candidate	Votes	%
Republican	Martin G. Madden	11,112	31.0
Republican	John S. Morgan	9,108	25.4
Democratic	Robert J. DiPietro (incumbent)	7,864	21.9
Democratic	William C. Bevan (incumbent)	7,772	21.7
Republican gain from Democratic			
Republican gain from Democratic			

=== District 14A ===
Maryland House of Delegates District 14A election
Party	Candidate	Votes	%
Democratic	Joel Chasnoff (incumbent)	7,951	53.7
Republican	Patricia Anne Faulkner	6,847	46.3
Democratic hold			

=== District 14B ===
Maryland House of Delegates District 14B election
Party	Candidate	Votes	%
Republican	Robert H. Kittleman (incumbent)	18,628	29.9
Republican	Robert Flanagan (incumbent)	18,013	28.9
Democratic	Lloyd G. Knowles	13,633	21.9
Democratic	James B. Kraft	12,054	19.3
Republican hold			
Republican hold			

=== District 15 ===
Maryland House of Delegates District 15 election
Party	Candidate	Votes	%
Republican	Jean Roesser (incumbent)	21,052	18.8
Democratic	Gene Counihan (incumbent)	20,059	17.9
Republican	Richard A. La Vay	18,896	16.8
Democratic	Rosemary Glynn	18,196	16.2
Democratic	Sally McGarry	17,652	15.7
Republican	Michael J. Baker	16,347	14.6
Republican hold			
Democratic hold			
Republican gain from Democratic			

=== District 16 ===
Maryland House of Delegates District 16 election
Party	Candidate	Votes	%
Democratic	Nancy Kopp (incumbent)	22,397	23.0
Democratic	Brian Frosh (incumbent)	21,901	22.0
Democratic	Gilbert J. Genn (incumbent)	21,022	21.1
Republican	Robert M. McCarthy	12,298	12.4
Republican	Nelson M. Rosenbaum	10,753	10.8
Republican	George Jenkins	10,602	10.7
Democratic hold			
Democratic hold			
Democratic hold			

=== District 17 ===
Maryland House of Delegates District 17 election
Party	Candidate	Votes	%
Democratic	Jennie M. Forehand (incumbent)	16,545	27.0
Democratic	Michael R. Gordon (incumbent)	15,552	25.4
Democratic	Kumar P. Barve	13,384	21.8
Republican	David S. Green	8,303	13.5
Republican	Torin K. Andrews	7,511	12.3
Democratic hold			
Democratic hold			
Democratic hold			

=== District 18 ===
Maryland House of Delegates District 18 election
Party	Candidate	Votes	%
Democratic	Patricia H. Billings (incumbent)	17,799	27.3
Democratic	Chris Van Hollen	16,956	26.0
Democratic	John Adams Hurson	16,200	24.9
Republican	John Joseph Heil	7,271	11.2
Republican	Jamie M. Staines	6,898	10.6
Democratic hold			
Democratic hold			
Democratic hold			

=== District 19 ===
Maryland House of Delegates District 19 election
Party	Candidate	Votes	%
Democratic	Leonard H. Teitelbaum (incumbent)	19,153	22.5
Democratic	Carol S. Petzold (incumbent)	19,024	22.3
Democratic	Henry B. Heller (incumbent)	18,897	22.2
Republican	W. Raymond Beck	10,913	12.8
Republican	Peter J. Tirinnanzi Jr.	9,261	10.9
Republican	Tomas Ramon Estrada-Palma	7,904	9.3
Democratic hold			
Democratic hold			
Democratic hold			

=== District 20 ===
Maryland House of Delegates District 20 election
Party	Candidate	Votes	%
Democratic	Dana Lee Dembrow (incumbent)	18,303	33.8
Democratic	Sheila E. Hixson (incumbent)	17,958	33.2
Democratic	Peter Franchot (incumbent)	17,871	33.0
Democratic hold			
Democratic hold			
Democratic hold			

=== District 21 ===
Maryland House of Delegates District 21 election
Party	Candidate	Votes	%
Democratic	Timothy F. Maloney (incumbent)	11,365	25.6
Democratic	Pauline Menes (incumbent)	11,081	24.9
Democratic	James Rosapepe (incumbent)	10,748	24.2
Republican	Debra DiCamillo	3,872	8.7
Republican	Charles D. Randall	3,799	8.6
Republican	Margaret Jahn	3,557	8.0
Democratic hold			
Democratic hold			
Democratic hold			

=== District 22 ===
Maryland House of Delegates District 22 election
Party	Candidate	Votes	%
Democratic	Richard A. Palumbo (incumbent)	10,353	27.1
Democratic	Paul G. Pinsky (incumbent)	9,566	25.0
Democratic	Anne Healey	9,355	24.5
Republican	Mary E. Rand	3,164	8.3
Republican	Gerard F. Kiernan	3,118	8.2
Republican	Bruce Gordon Pope	2,666	7.0
Democratic hold			
Democratic hold			
Democratic hold			

=== District 23 ===
Maryland House of Delegates District 23 election
Party	Candidate	Votes	%
Democratic	Mary A. Conroy (incumbent)	16,248	24.3
Democratic	Joan Breslin Pitkin (incumbent)	16,069	24.1
Democratic	Charles J. Ryan Jr. (incumbent)	15,599	23.4
Republican	Robert S. Sanders	6,486	9.7
Republican	Roger D. Chamberlain	6,203	9.3
Republican	James William Thompson	6,190	9.3
Democratic hold			
Democratic hold			
Democratic hold			

=== District 24 ===
Maryland House of Delegates District 24 election
Party	Candidate	Votes	%
Democratic	Sylvania W. Woods Jr. (incumbent)	10,954	31.6
Democratic	Joanne C. Benson	10,721	30.9
Democratic	Nathaniel Exum (incumbent)	10,691	30.8
Republican	Edward J. Turner	2,307	6.7
Democratic hold			
Democratic hold			
Democratic hold			

=== District 25 ===
Maryland House of Delegates District 25 election
Party	Candidate	Votes	%
Democratic	Michael Arrington	11,698	30.8
Democratic	Beatrice P. Tignor	11,506	30.3
Democratic	Ulysses Currie (incumbent)	11,369	29.9
Republican	Katherine Garnett	1,847	4.9
Republican	David S. Bernstein	1,594	4.2
Democratic hold			
Democratic hold			
Democratic hold			

=== District 26 ===
Maryland House of Delegates District 26 election
Party	Candidate	Votes	%
Democratic	Rosa Lee Blumenthal (incumbent)	11,941	30.5
Democratic	Christine Miller Jones (incumbent)	11,888	30.3
Democratic	David Mercado Valderrama	10,889	27.8
Republican	Claude W. Roxborough	4,497	11.5
Democratic hold			
Democratic hold			
Democratic hold			

=== District 27 ===
Maryland House of Delegates District 27 election
Party	Candidate	Votes	%
Democratic	Gary R. Alexander (incumbent)	15,851	26.5
Democratic	Joseph F. Vallario Jr. (incumbent)	15,696	26.2
Democratic	James E. Proctor Jr. (incumbent)	15,160	25.3
Republican	John Mitchell Brown	4,697	7.8
Republican	Ronald R. Austin	4,300	7.2
Republican	David A. Tibbetts	4,217	7.0
Democratic hold			
Democratic hold			
Democratic hold			

=== District 28A ===
Maryland House of Delegates District 28A election
Party	Candidate	Votes	%
Democratic	Michael J. Sprague (incumbent)	10,700	40.3
Democratic	Stephen J. Braun	9,709	36.6
Republican	Joseph T. Crawford	6,131	23.1
Democratic hold			
Democratic hold			

=== District 28B ===
Maryland House of Delegates District 28B election
Party	Candidate	Votes	%
Democratic	John F. Wood Jr. (incumbent)	4,267	63.9
Republican	Thomas Young	2,410	36.1
Democratic hold			

=== District 29A ===
Maryland House of Delegates District 29A election
Party	Candidate	Votes	%
Democratic	George W. Owings III (incumbent)	5,709	54.7
Republican	Edward B. Finch	3,711	35.6
Independent	William Johnston	1,012	9.7
Democratic hold			

=== District 29B ===
Maryland House of Delegates District 29B election
Party	Candidate	Votes	%
Democratic	J. Ernest Bell II (incumbent)	6,639	83.5
Republican	James T. O'Donnell	1,313	16.5
Democratic hold			

=== District 29C ===
Maryland House of Delegates District 29C election
Party	Candidate	Votes	%
Democratic	John F. Slade III (incumbent)	4,296	100.0
Democratic hold			

=== District 30 ===
Maryland House of Delegates District 30 election
Party	Candidate	Votes	%
Democratic	John Astle (incumbent)	18,009	22.9
Republican	Aris T. Allen	16,951	21.5
Democratic	Michael E. Busch (incumbent)	16,104	20.5
Democratic	Edith Segree	14,341	18.2
Republican	Phillip D. Bissett	13,321	16.9
Democratic hold			
Republican hold			
Democratic hold			

=== District 31 ===
Maryland House of Delegates District 31 election
Party	Candidate	Votes	%
Democratic	Joan Cadden	17,201	21.4
Democratic	W. Ray Huff (incumbent)	14,311	17.8
Democratic	Charles Kolodziejski (incumbent)	14,230	17.7
Republican	James J. Riley	13,420	16.7
Republican	Evelyn O. Kampmeyer	10,732	13.4
Republican	Douglas Arnold	10,415	13.0
Democratic gain from Republican			
Democratic hold			
Democratic hold			

=== District 32 ===
Maryland House of Delegates District 32 election
Party	Candidate	Votes	%
Democratic	Patrick C. Scannello (incumbent)	14,448	35.1
Democratic	Tyras S. Athey (incumbent)	13,535	32.9
Democratic	Victor Sulin	13,136	31.9
Democratic hold			
Democratic hold			
Democratic hold			

=== District 33 ===
Maryland House of Delegates District 33 election
Party	Candidate	Votes	%
Republican	Elizabeth S. Smith (incumbent)	15,861	20.4
Republican	John G. Gary (incumbent)	15,607	20.1
Democratic	Marsha G. Perry (incumbent)	15,123	19.5
Democratic	Bill Burlison	13,199	17.0
Republican	Edwin E. Edel	10,128	13.0
Democratic	Sabine N. Bosma	7,733	10.0
Republican hold			
Republican hold			
Democratic hold			

=== District 34 ===
Maryland House of Delegates District 34 election
Party	Candidate	Votes	%
Democratic	Rose Mary Hatem Bonsack	13,373	19.5
Democratic	Mary Louise Preis	13,045	19.0
Republican	David R. Craig	12,031	17.5
Democratic	William H. Cox Jr. (incumbent)	10,296	15.0
Republican	David M. Meadows	10,069	14.7
Republican	Cecil W. Wood	9,840	14.3
Democratic hold			
Democratic hold			
Republican gain from Democratic			

=== District 35A ===
Maryland House of Delegates District 35A election
Party	Candidate	Votes	%
Republican	James M. Harkins	10,122	28.6
Democratic	Donald C. Fry	8,791	24.8
Republican	Dorothy Polek Stancill	8,594	24.2
Democratic	Joseph Lutz (incumbent)	7,946	22.4
Republican gain from Democratic			
Democratic hold			

=== District 35B ===
Maryland House of Delegates District 35B election
Party	Candidate	Votes	%
Democratic	Ethel Ann Murray	4,692	100.0
Democratic hold			

=== District 36 ===
Maryland House of Delegates District 36 election
Party	Candidate	Votes	%
Democratic	R. Clayton Mitchell Jr. (incumbent)	13,730	28.3
Democratic	Ronald A. Guns (incumbent)	13,268	27.4
Republican	C. Ronald Franks	11,204	23.1
Democratic	Frances A. Ashley	10,238	21.1
Democratic hold			
Democratic hold			
Republican gain from Democratic			

=== District 37 ===
Maryland House of Delegates District 37 election
Party	Candidate	Votes	%
Democratic	Samuel Q. Johnson III	12,803	23.2
Democratic	Robert A. Thornton Jr.	12,480	22.6
Republican	Kenneth D. Schisler	11,096	20.1
Republican	Adelaide C. Eckardt	9,559	17.3
Democratic	Don William Bradley	9,210	16.7
Democratic hold			
Democratic hold			
Republican gain from Democratic			

=== District 38 ===
Maryland House of Delegates District 38 election
Party	Candidate	Votes	%
Democratic	Norman Conway (incumbent)	17,540	25.4
Democratic	Bennett Bozman	15,224	22.1
Republican	J. Lowell Stoltzfus	14,563	21.1
Democratic	M. Kirk Daughtery	11,992	17.4
Republican	C. Robert Welsh	9,617	14.0
Democratic hold			
Democratic hold			
Republican gain from Democratic			

=== District 39 ===
Maryland House of Delegates District 39 election
Party	Candidate	Votes	%
Democratic	Elijah Cummings (incumbent)	6,369	35.3
Democratic	Ruth M. Kirk (incumbent)	5,989	33.2
Democratic	John D. Jeffries (incumbent)	5,659	31.4
Democratic hold			
Democratic hold			
Democratic hold			

=== District 40 ===
Maryland House of Delegates District 40 election
Party	Candidate	Votes	%
Democratic	Pete Rawlings (incumbent)	7,992	35.2
Democratic	Tony E. Fulton (incumbent)	7,840	34.6
Democratic	Salima Siler Marriott	6,841	30.2
Democratic hold			
Democratic hold			
Democratic hold			

=== District 41 ===
Maryland House of Delegates District 41 election
Party	Candidate	Votes	%
Democratic	Margaret H. Murphy (incumbent)	10,277	37.1
Democratic	Frank Boston (incumbent)	8,771	31.6
Democratic	Samuel M. Parham (incumbent)	8,677	31.3
Democratic hold			
Democratic hold			
Democratic hold			

=== District 42 ===
Maryland House of Delegates District 42 election
Party	Candidate	Votes	%
Democratic	Samuel I. Rosenberg (incumbent)	12,633	34.1
Democratic	James W. Campbell (incumbent)	12,477	33.7
Democratic	Delores G. Kelley	11,949	32.2
Democratic hold			
Democratic hold			
Democratic hold			

=== District 43 ===
Maryland House of Delegates District 43 election
Party	Candidate	Votes	%
Democratic	Ann Marie Doory (incumbent)	11,914	28.8
Democratic	Henry R. Hergenroeder Jr. (incumbent)	11,409	27.6
Democratic	Gerald Curran (incumbent)	11,075	26.8
Republican	Robert T. Menas	6,955	16.8
Democratic hold			
Democratic hold			
Democratic hold			

=== District 44 ===
Maryland House of Delegates District 44 election
Party	Candidate	Votes	%
Democratic	Curt Anderson (incumbent)	10,950	30.8
Democratic	Anne Scarlett Perkins (incumbent)	10,881	30.6
Democratic	Kenneth C. Montague Jr. (incumbent)	10,536	29.6
Republican	Duane Frazier	3,180	8.9
Democratic hold			
Democratic hold			
Democratic hold			

=== District 45 ===
Maryland House of Delegates District 45 election
Party	Candidate	Votes	%
Democratic	John W. Douglass (incumbent)	7,316	32.1
Democratic	Hattie N. Harrison (incumbent)	7,079	31.1
Democratic	Clarence "Tiger" Davis (incumbent)	6,875	30.2
Republican	Ronald Mumin Owens-Bey	781	3.4
Republican	Peggy Monaghan	728	3.2
Democratic hold			
Democratic hold			
Democratic hold			

=== District 46 ===
Maryland House of Delegates District 46 election
Party	Candidate	Votes	%
Democratic	Anthony M. DiPietro Jr. (incumbent)	9,233	34.3
Democratic	Cornell N. Dypski (incumbent)	9,122	33.9
Democratic	Carolyn J. Krysiak	8,593	31.9
Democratic hold			
Democratic hold			
Democratic hold			

=== District 47 ===
Maryland House of Delegates District 47 election
Party	Candidate	Votes	%
Democratic	Brian K. McHale (incumbent)	6,413	30.0
Democratic	R. Charles Avara (incumbent)	6,395	29.9
Democratic	Paul E. Weisengoff (incumbent)	6,377	29.8
Republican	Michael Luther Burgess	2,209	10.3
Democratic hold			
Democratic hold			
Democratic hold			
