= Robert Cassilly (politician) =

American politician (born 1958)

Bob Cassilly
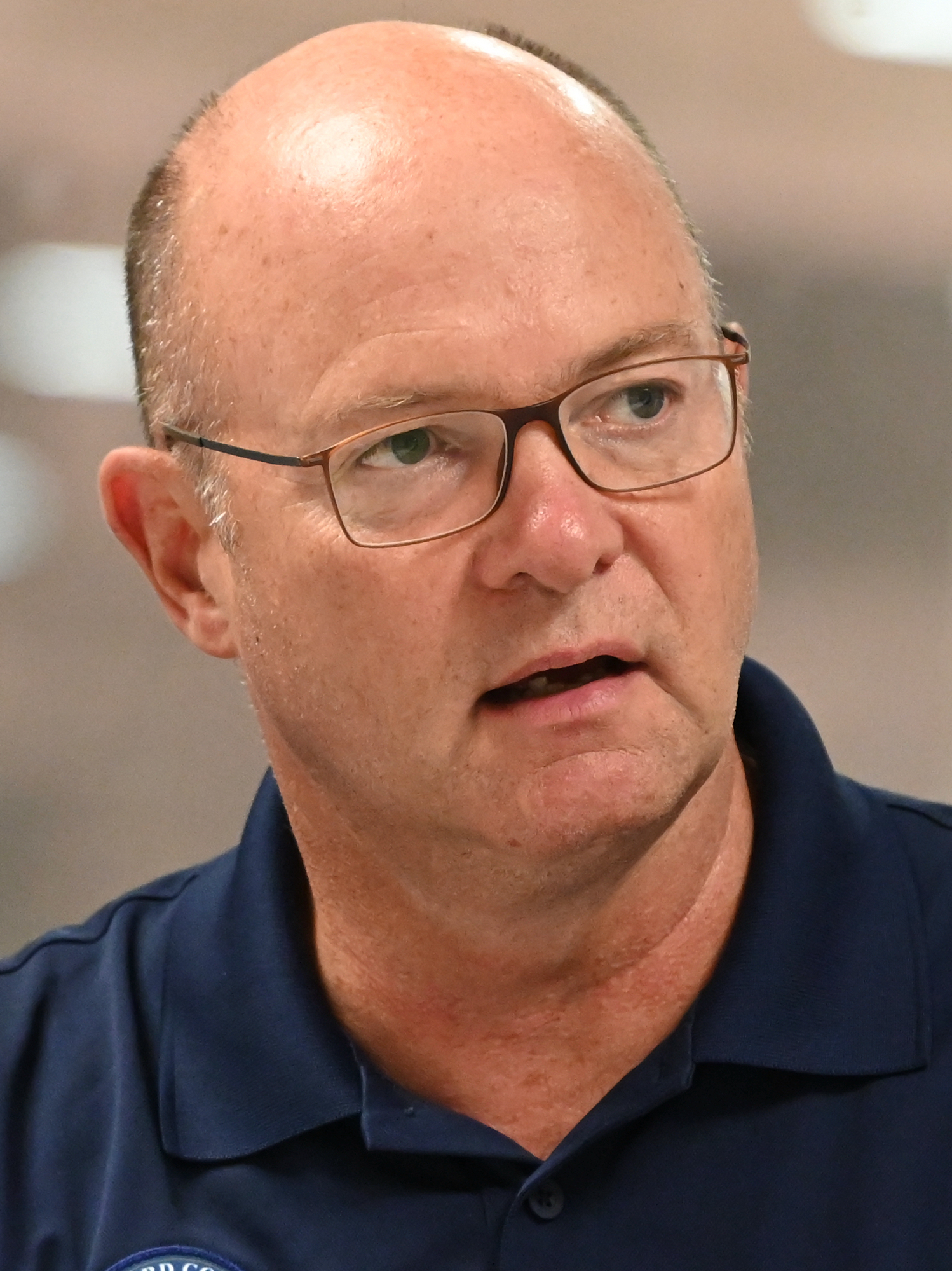
- Cassilly in 2023

8th Executive of Harford County
- Incumbent
- Assumed office December 5, 2022
- Preceded by: Barry Glassman

Member of the Maryland Senate from the 34th district
- In office January 14, 2015 – December 5, 2022
- Preceded by: Nancy Jacobs
- Succeeded by: Christian Miele

Member of the Harford County Council from District C
- In office December 2, 2002 – December 4, 2006
- Preceded by: Michael Geppi
- Succeeded by: James V. McMahan Jr.

Bel Air Town Commissioner
- In office 1997–2001

Personal details
- Born: Robert Cassilly; July 8, 1958 (age 68) Havre de Grace, Maryland, U.S.
- Party: Republican
- Children: 5
- Education: Johns Hopkins University (BA); University of Baltimore (JD)
- Awards: Bronze Star
- Website: Campaign website

Military service
- Allegiance: United States
- Branch/service: United States Army; Maryland National Guard
- Years of service: 1976–present
- Unit: 101st Airborne Division
- Battles/wars: Iraq War

Robert G. Cassilly (born July 8, 1958) is an American politician who is currently the county executive of Harford County, Maryland. He previously served in the Maryland State Senate from 2015 to 2022, representing District 34.

== Early life and education ==
Cassilly was born on July 8, 1958, in Havre de Grace, Maryland. He was one of twelve children born to Robert R. Cassilly Jr. and Nancy Cassilly.

Cassilly graduated from Bel Air High School in 1976, and later attended Johns Hopkins University, where he was a member of the Reserve Officers' Training Corps and earned a B.A. degree in international relations in 1980. Cassilly later attended the University of Baltimore School of Law, where he earned a J.D. degree cum laude in 1988. While attending the University of Baltimore, he served as a law clerk to Circuit Court Judge Dana M. Levitz and Court of Special Appeals Judge John J. Bishop Jr.

== Career ==
From 1976 to 1978, Cassilly served in the Maryland National Guard. He later served in the 7th Infantry Division of the United States Army from 1980 to 1985. In February 2006, Cassilly was activated by the United States Army and deployed in Iraq, where he served as a senior governance advisor in the Karbala Governorate and as a strategic planner for the U.S. Embassy in Baghdad until 2010. After returning to the United States, Cassilly worked for three years in the United States Department of State, supporting U.S. efforts to counter violent extremists in the Near East region.

Cassilly first got involved in politics in 1992, when he became a member of the Harford County Republican Central Committee. He served in this position until 1997, when he was elected to the Bel Air, Maryland town commission. Cassilly served as the commission's president from 2000 to 2001, and resigned in 2002 after he was elected to the Harford County Council, representing District C in southeastern parts of the county. Cassilly declined to resign from the County Council after being mobilized in February 2006, expressing concern that his resignation "might result in a significant shift of the current balance of interests on the Council in a manner that would not be favorable to the citizens". However, because he did not file to run for re-election before his deployment, he was barred from running for re-election under Department of Defense Directive 1344.10.

In September 2013, Cassilly started his own law firm.

=== Maryland Senate ===
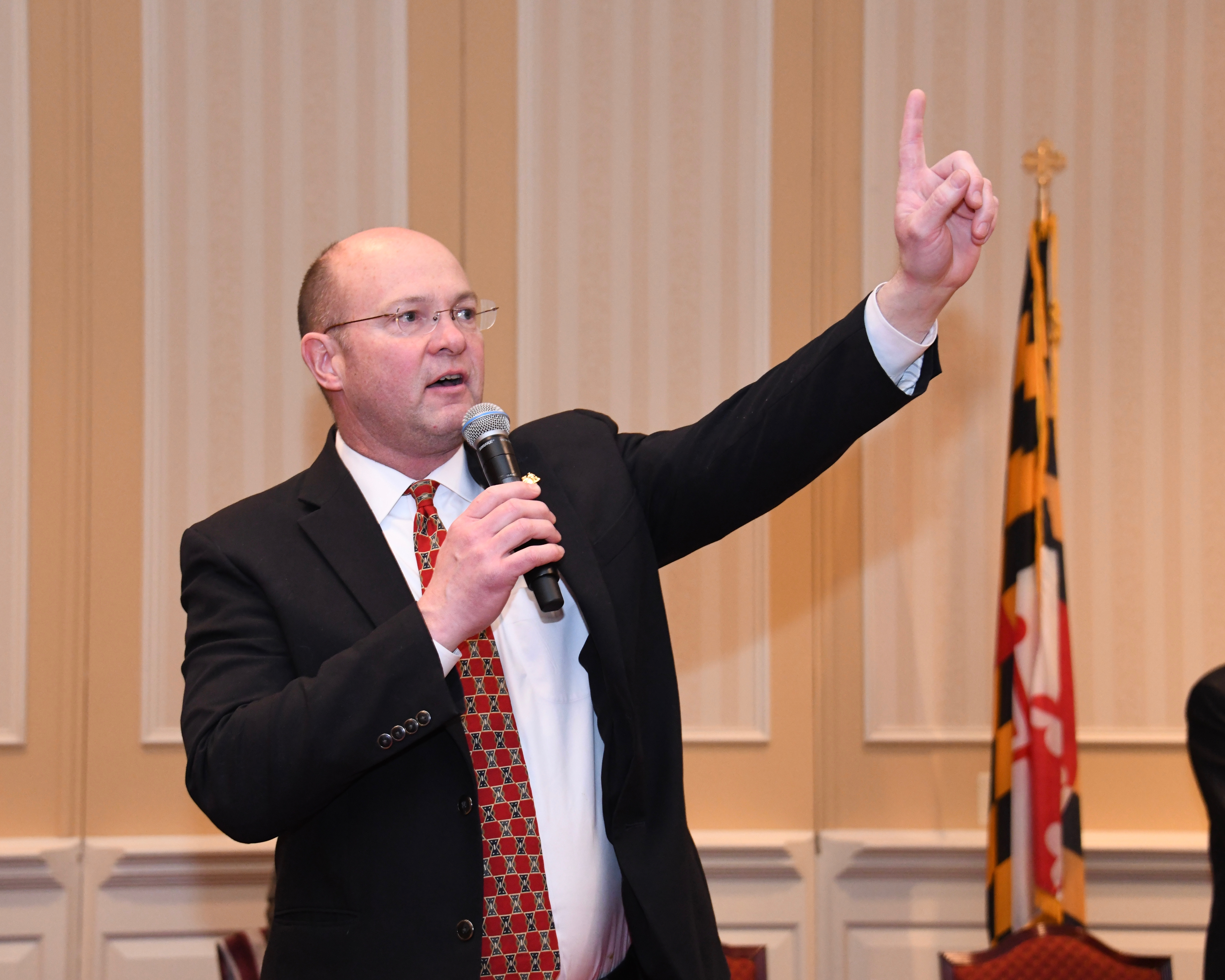
Cassilly in 2018

==== Elections ====
In September 2013, Cassilly filed to run for Maryland Senate in District 34, seeking to succeed retiring state senator Nancy Jacobs. He ran unopposed in the Republican primary election and defeated Democratic state delegate Mary-Dulany James in the general election. At the same time, his younger brother Andrew Cassilly was elected as state delegate in District 35B and his other brother was re-elected as state's attorney.

Cassilly filed to run for re-election in January 2018. He defeated former state delegate Mary-Dulany James in a tight general election on November 6, 2018, receiving 50.1 percent of the vote to James's 49.7 percent, or by a 189 vote margin out of 48,788 votes cast.

==== Tenure ====
Cassilly was sworn into the Maryland Senate on January 14, 2015. He was a member of the Judicial Proceedings Committee during his entire tenure, as well as the Joint Committee on Federal Relations and the Joint Committee on Administrative, Executive and Legislative Review.

=== Harford County Executive ===
==== Tenure ====
2022 Harford County executive election results by precinct Cassilly: 50–60%; 60–70%; 70–80%; 80–90%; Miller: 40–50%; 50–60%; 60–70%; 70–80%

In April 2021, Cassilly opted not to run for re-election to a third term to the Maryland Senate, instead filing to run for Harford County executive. He defeated rival Billy Boniface in the Republican primary on July 19, 2022, and later defeated Democratic nominee Blane Miller III in the general election on November 8. Cassilly was sworn in as county executive on December 5.

Cassilly is running for a second term as county executive in 2026. He faces a primary challenge from Howard County Council president Patrick Vincenti. Maryland Matters has described the Republican primary as a schism between personalities and factions within the county Republican Party rather than substantive differences between candidates, with Vincenti representing an old-style "Main Street" Republican and Cassilly having a harder conservative edge.

==== County government infighting ====
Cassilly's first year as county executive was marked by infighting with the Harford County government, including the County Council, which he has described as "political attacks" by unnamed political entities in the county.

Following his election, Cassilly moved to block newly elected Democratic county councilmember Jacob Bennett from attending the county's inaugural ceremonies, citing a Section 207 of the Harford County Charter, which prevents people with county or state jobs from serving on the county council. In February 2023, Harford County Circuit Court Judge Richard Bernhardt ruled in Cassilly's favor, saying that Bennett could not serve on the county council until he resigned from his position as a middle school science teacher. Following this decision, Cassilly changed the locks on Bennett's office and restricted access to his government email account. In April 2023, the Maryland Supreme Court overturned the lower court ruling, allowing Bennett to take office.

In July 2023, County Councilmember Aaron Penman accused Cassilly of violating Maryland's wiretapping statutes by monitoring communications between Penman, county Sheriff Jeffrey Gahler, former county executive Barry Glassman, and various "targeted citizens". The emails were searched after the county human resources director asked the county Office of Information Technology director to search Penman's email for communications between him and various other officials in county government to determine if there was "any basis to suspect misuse of county funds". Penman had earlier accused Cassilly of misappropriating county funds by transferring $7 million from the county's general fund to the Department of Emergency Management. In a statement to Maryland Matters, Cassilly acknowledged monitoring Penman's emails, but denied any wrongdoing, asserting that county policy allowed for such reviews and attributing his accusations to politics. A criminal investigation was opened into the wiretapping allegations by Harford County State's Attorney Allison Healey, and later turned over to the Office of the Maryland State Prosecutor to avoid conflicts of interest.

In September 2023, Cassilly temporarily blocked county auditor Chrystal Brooks from accessing Workday, a financial reporting program used by the county, a potential violation of the county charter. The restrictions appear to have been placed in response to budget disputes from earlier in his term, including Cassilly's opposition to a new facility for the Harford County Sheriff's Department. Brooks' access to the financial system was restored later in the week.

In late September 2023, Healey threatened to sue Cassilly after he blocked her access to the email account of a "key employee who is on emergency family leave". Cassilly associated the request with the ongoing criminal investigation into Penman's wiretapping allegations and said that she could gain access to the emails if she released a statement denying Cassilly of any wrongdoing in the investigation. Following the threat of a lawsuit, Cassilly granted Healey with access to new emails sent to the employee.

In October 2023, Cassilly sought the removal of Penman from the Harford County Council, arguing that him serving as a councilmember and as a deputy sheriff was a violation of the county charter. County Council President Patrick Vicenti rejected Cassilly's request to unseat Penman, saying that the council did not have the authority to remove him and suggested that Cassilly seek a court order to determine if Penman violated the county charter. In February 2024, Penman field an ethics complaint against Cassilly, alleging that he expedited the approval of a real estate plat submitted on the behalf of his brother, Joseph Cassilly. Cassilly rejected Penman's accusations, saying that his director of administration, Robert McCord, reviewed and signed the plat since it involved his brother, and once again called for the removal of Penman from office. In January 2025, Harford County Circuit Court judge Richard Bernhardt Sr. issued a court order removing Penman from office because of his employment with the Harford County Sheriff's Office. The Supreme Court of Maryland denied a petition by Penman to review this decision as it was being reviewed in the Appellate Court of Maryland, removing Penman from the county council. In April 2026, the Appellate Court overturned the circuit court ruling that led Penman to lose his seat on the Harford County Council. This ruling was overturned by the Maryland Supreme Court on November 10, 2026, which ruled that Penman could not serve on the county council while working as a sheriff's deputy.

In March 2024, the Maryland Public Information Act Compliance Board found Cassilly's administration in violation of the Public Information Act after refusing to fulfill a request by Harford County Sheriff Jeffrey Gahler to disclose emails connected to a feasibility study conducted on the county's behalf by architectural firm Manns Woodward Studios. In response, Cassilly said that he would not fulfill Gahler's request until the county circuit court ruled on whether the Compliance Board had authority to state whether accessing county servers is illegal.

== Political positions ==
=== Crime and policing ===
During the 2017 legislative session, Cassilly voted against a bill that would give the Attorney General of Maryland the ability to sue the federal government. He also opposed a bill that would give investigators in the Baltimore State's Attorney's Office police powers.

In October 2017, after a man killed three co-workers and critically wounded two others in Edgewood, Maryland, Cassilly introduced a bill to allow judges to sentence people convicted of serial murder or murder of a law enforcement officer to death.

In 2021, Cassilly voted against a bill that would end life without parole sentences for juveniles.

In August 2023, following the murder of Rachel Morin on the Ma and Pa Trail, Cassilly ordered the installation of security cameras along the trail.

=== Development initiatives ===
During his county council candidacy in 2002, Cassilly said the council needed "to look at all revenue sources" to address infrastructure needs and should address growth holistically.

In 2003, Cassilly said he opposed a proposal to limit the height of buildings in downtown Bel Air to five stories, expressing concerns that it would have unintended effects on the area.

In 2004, after a gasoline leak at an Exxon station contaminated well water at 225 homes with methyl tert-butyl ether, Cassilly introduced a bill that would place a temporary moratorium on the construction of gas stations in Harford County. The county council unanimously voted to pass the bill in September 2004, and it was signed into law by County Executive James M. Harkins in the same month. In 2005, Cassilly introduced a bill that would ban gas stations near homes with well water systems.

In December 2004, Cassilly voted for a bill placing a 90-day moratorium on senior housing construction, expressing concern with the amount of senior housing development in the county.

In February 2023, Cassilly proposed a six-month moratorium on permits for county warehouse projects. The bill passed by a 6–1 vote and was signed into law on April 18, 2023. In October 2023, Cassilly supported a bill to limit the size of warehouses built in Harford County, which passed the county council in a 5-2 vote.

=== Education ===
In 2018, following the Parkland and Great Mills high school shootings, Cassilly supported a bill that would put a school resource officer in every school. Cassilly opposes the Blueprint for Maryland's Future, an education reform package passed by the legislature in 2021.

During his tenure as county executive, Cassilly frequently battled with county superintendent Sean Bulson and the county school board over funding for the Harford County Public Schools system, saying that he would not raise taxes to pay for the state's Blueprint reforms and blaming the school system's budgetary crisis on the use of American Rescue Plan Act to create more than 100 new positions. Cassilly also disputed Bulson's claims that the county school system should have received consistent five percent increases annually since 2023, arguing that such increases would require the county to "eliminate ambulances and defund the police" and that the county should instead return to a "normal rate of increases" that matches what the district has seen for the past fifteen years. Bulson disputed Cassilly's arguments as misinformed, saying that the county already has the funding needed to provide consistent funding increases to the school system as opposed to keeping funding flat, which he said would increase class sizes and cut teaching positions.

In his first budget in April 2023, Cassilly proposed cutting the county's education by $19 million, which was criticized by the county Superintendent of Schools Sean Bulson as the "worst-case scenario". Cassilly defended these cuts, pointing out that Harford County Public Schools had a $90 million surplus and was due to receive $20 million in funding from the Blueprint. In May 2023, Cassilly and the Harford County school board reached an agreement to increase funding for Harford County Public Schools by $25 million. He signed his budget into law on June 15, 2023.

During his 2024 state of the county address, Cassilly said that he would propose a five percent increase to the county's public schools funding; his fiscal year 2025 budget, unveiled in April 2024, did not include any increase in funding for the county's school system, which he blamed on an unexpected drop in income tax revenues. Cassilly further blamed the state's minimum wage increase and tax policies for the revenue drop and refused to increase county taxes to pay for the five percent increase, citing the $99 million held in reserves by the school board, community college, and public library system.

In October 2024, after the county school system and sheriff's office requested $80 million in additional funding for wage increases, Cassilly posted a video to Facebook telling school officials to "stop playing politics" and to "face to the fiscal reality", citing two consecutive years of low revenue growth in the county. He added that the county would need to raise property taxes by 20 percent to afford the wage increases, which he refused to do.

In January 2026, Cassilly called for the resignation of Harford County Public Schools superintendent Sean Bulson after Turnbull Brockmeyer Law Group posted an audio recording of a 9-1-1 call Bulson made during a conference in New Orleans. In the call, Bulson reported that a woman he had let into the room stole his wallet, two phones, an Apple Watch, an iPad, and a laptop before leaving while he was asleep. The Maryland Office of the Inspector General for Education investigated the phone call at the request of Harford County's school board, which found that no school-issued items were stolen from Bulson. In February 2026, the Harford County Board of Education voted to terminate its contract with Bulson. During an interview with The Baltimore Banner in April 2026, Bulson suggested that his removal as superintendent was politically motivated and accused Cassilly of using the controversy to push him out. Bulson cited a bill introduced by Cassilly in 2022, while he was running for county executive, that would transfer the power to appoint three school board members from the governor to the county executive, saying that he believes Cassilly later appointed members to "do his bidding". Cassilly disputed this characterization and denied having anything to do with getting the 9-1-1 call posted by Turnbull Brockmeyer or any of the social media posts that followed, calling Bulson's silence on the New Orleans incident a leadership failure that led to his downfall.

=== Government ===
In 2003, Cassilly introduced a bill that would have created a ballot referendum on whether the Harford County Council should have the ability to hire an auditor to oversee the county's finances. The bill was reintroduced in 2004 and passed by a 4–3 vote but was vetoed by County Executive James M. Harkins.

In 2016, Cassilly opposed provisions in a bill that would require automatic government spending on several Baltimore-targeted programs.

In November 2016, Cassilly said he opposed the Question A referendum in Harford County, which would move the county's property acquisition procedures from the Department of Procurement to the Department of Administration.

In July 2024, Cassilly vetoed a bill to create a 2024 county referendum that, if approved by voters, would have given the Harford County Council the ability to reallocate funds to any part of the county budget.

=== Guns ===
During the 2016 legislative session, Cassilly introduced a bill to remove the "one shot" requirement from firearm safety training courses, arguing that it didn't "do anything to promote weapons safety".

=== Immigration ===
In November 2023, Cassilly opposed a proposal that he claimed would house about 220 undocumented immigrants in Harford County-area hotels, saying that he would "use every resource at my disposal to prevent it". State officials told The Baltimore Sun shortly after Cassilly made this statement that there was no such plan in the works. In June 2024, Cassilly blamed illegal immigration and the immigration policy of the Joe Biden administration for the murders of Rachel Morin and Kayla Hamilton. After Donald Trump won the 2024 United States presidential election, Cassilly pledged to "fully support" Trump's mass deportation program.

=== Marijuana ===
In 2018, Cassilly voted against a bill that would lessen the penalties for carrying an ounce of marijuana, which he said was "too high a threshold". He also opposed a bill that would have created a referendum to legalize recreational marijuana. During the 2019 legislative session, Cassilly introduced a bill to prohibit smoking or consuming marijuana in a vehicle on the highway.

=== Minimum wage ===
In 2019, Cassilly voted against a bill that would raise the state's minimum wage to $15 an hour by 2025, calling it a "direct assault" on companies that offer entry-level positions.

=== Social issues ===
During the 2015 legislative session, Cassilly introduced a bill that would allow evidence of previous sexual assault allegations to be brought in to criminal trials. In March 2020, he wrote to Republican members of the Maryland House of Delegates urging them to vote against a bill to extend the statute of limitations on child sexual abuse lawsuits, comparing the bill to the sexual assault accusations made against U.S. Supreme Court Justice Brett Kavanaugh during his nomination.

In 2016, Cassilly voted against a bill to strip pro-Confederate lyrics from the state song, "Maryland, My Maryland", accusing legislators of erasing the history of people who felt deeply about their principles. In 2018, he opposed a bill that would strip the song of its title as the official state anthem, distancing himself from the song's pro-Confederate sympathies but likening its reclassification to "book burning" and praising its homage to Maryland's military glories. In 2021, he voted for a bill to scrap "Maryland, My Maryland" as the official state anthem.

In January 2018, Cassilly objected to remarks made on the floor of the Maryland Senate condemning comments made by President Donald Trump calling Haiti, El Salvador, and African nations "shithole countries", saying that the remarks were "not appropriate matter for the Senate of Maryland".

In 2019, Cassilly said he opposed a bill to legalize palliative care, saying he believed that it would shift the state's medical community's focus away from hospice care.

During the 2020 legislative session, Cassilly voted to sustain Governor Larry Hogan's veto of a bill that would limit employers from asking a job applicant's criminal record.

=== Transportation ===
In 2016, Cassilly voted to sustain Governor Larry Hogan's veto on a bill that would require the governor to publicly rate and rank transportation projects before including them in the state budget.

== Personal life ==
Cassilly is married to his wife Debbie, whom he had met at Bel Air High School. They live in Bel Air, Maryland and have five children.

== Electoral history ==
Harford County Council District C Republican primary election, 1998
Party	Candidate	Votes	%
Republican	Michael Geppi	6,817	50.4
Republican	Bob Cassilly	6,719	49.6

Harford County Council District C Republican primary election, 2002
Party	Candidate	Votes	%
Republican	Bob Cassilly	2,082	50.3
Republican	Michael Geppi (incumbent)	2,054	49.7

Harford County Council District C election, 2002
Party	Candidate	Votes	%
Republican	Bob Cassilly	11,751	70.5
Democratic	Joan Morrissey Ward	3,987	23.9
Independent	Clifton Dowling Jr.	900	5.4
Write-in		20	0.1

Maryland Senate District 34 Republican primary election, 2014
Party	Candidate	Votes	%
Republican	Bob Cassilly	5,058	100.0

Maryland Senate District 34 election, 2014
Party	Candidate	Votes	%
Republican	Bob Cassilly	22,042	57.2
Democratic	Mary-Dulany James	16,459	42.7
Write-in		62	0.2

Maryland Senate District 34 election, 2018
Party	Candidate	Votes	%
Republican	Bob Cassilly (incumbent)	24,445	50.1
Democratic	Mary-Dulany James	24,256	49.7
Write-in		87	0.2

Harford County Executive Republican primary results, 2022
Party	Candidate	Votes	%
Republican	Bob Cassilly	19,626	66.5
Republican	Billy Boniface	9,879	33.5

Harford County Executive election, 2022
Party	Candidate	Votes	%
Republican	Bob Cassilly	65,490	64.1
Democratic	Blane H. Miller III	36,408	35.6
Write-in		268	0.3
Total votes		102,166	100.0
