= Barbara Osborn Kreamer =

American politician (born 1948)

Member of the Maryland House of Delegates from the 34th district
- In office 1983–1991 Serving with William H. Cox Jr. and Eileen M. Rehrmann
- Preceded by: Catherine I. Riley
- Succeeded by: David R. Craig

Member of the Harford County Council
- In office 1978–1982
- Preceded by: William Cooper
- Succeeded by: G. Edward Fielder

Personal details
- Born: Barbara Leighton Osborn; December 8, 1948 (age 77) Baltimore, Maryland, U.S.
- Party: Democratic Party
- Children: 2
- Education: Washington College (BA); Johns Hopkins University (MLA); University of Maryland (JD)
- Occupation: Lawyer; politician

Barbara Osborn Kreamer (born December 8, 1948) is an American politician from Aberdeen, Maryland, and a former Democratic member of the Maryland House of Delegates. She was the first woman member of the Harford County Council and the first elected member of a county board in Maryland to give birth.

== Early life ==
Barbara Osborn was born on December 8, 1948, in Baltimore, Maryland, to Nancy Leigh (née Cronin) and J. Grafton Osborn, Sr. Kreamer attended Aberdeen High School. She earned a B.A. from Washington College in 1970, an M.L.A. from Johns Hopkins University in 1975, and a J.D. from the University of Maryland School of Law in 1989.

== Career ==
From 1971 to 1976, Kreamer was an English and creative writing teacher at Bel Air High School. After graduating from the University of Maryland School of Law, she passed the Maryland bar and became a lawyer. She conducted a solo general civil practice of law in Harford and Cecil Counties for fourteen years, until she was disbarred in 2008.

Kreamer served one four-year term on the County Council of Harford County, Maryland representing District E from 1978 to 1982. She represented the County Council to the Northeast Regional Waste Authority and the Board of Estimates. She led the Council to increase funding for public education thereby improving Harford's funding ranking in the state. She initiated a comparable worth plank in the American County Platform from her post on the National Association of Counties Committee on Labor and Employee Benefits.

Kreamer was appointed to two four-year terms on the Maryland Commission for Women in 1977 and 1981. She led the comparable worth initiative that reformed the Maryland state government pay plan to pay workers in female and minority-dominated positions according to comparable worth principles.

Kreamer was elected to the Maryland House of Delegates for two four-year terms, representing District 34, Harford County, from 1983 until 1991. She sponsored successful education, employment, family, minority rights and procurement bills. Kreamer chaired the Procurement Subcommittee that reviewed and sponsored a long-delayed revision of the Maryland Procurement Code. The Maryland State Teachers' Association, the Maryland Psychologists' Association, Nine to Five: Baltimore Working Women and the Maryland Nurses Association gave Kreamer awards.

She served as the President of the Maryland Association of Elected Women in 1985. Elected by the Democrats of the First Congressional District of Maryland, she was a Delegate to the Democratic National Convention in 1988 that nominated Governor Michael Dukakis for President of the United States. The Democrats of Harford County have elected Kreamer to six four-year terms on the Maryland State Democratic Central Committee beginning in 1998. She served as vice-chairwoman.

Kreamer had multiple attorney grievance complaints filed against her, which ultimately led to her disbarment in 2008. The first grievance was filed on February 2, 1999, and the Court indefinitely suspended Kreamer for failing to communicate with her clients and Bar Counsel, failing to deposit unearned fees into escrow, and misrepresenting the status of client matters. Her license was re-instated on June 10, 1999. On June 21, 2005 she was indefinitely suspended with the ability to re-apply for re-instatement within 6 months. The Court found that Kreamer had failed to communicate with her client, failed to represent the client in a diligent manner, and failed to maintain proper bookkeeping practices. Kreamer never filed for reinstatement before the final action was brought that resulted in her disbarment in 2008. In this 2008 case she faced complaints by six clients, which were consolidated into one final decision. She was found to have incompetently managed her clients' affairs, a lack of diligence, of having failed to maintain communications with clients, of incompetently representing her clients, and inappropriately charged for "accounting services".

== Elections ==
In 1990, Kreamer ran for the 1st Congressional District of the U.S. House of Representatives. She lost in the Democratic primary to incumbent Roy Dyson.

In 1994, Kreamer ran for lieutenant governor in the Democratic Primary with state senator Mary Boergers of Montgomery County in the “first all-female top ticket” in the nation. The winning ticket was Parris Glendening and Kathleen Kennedy Townsend.

In 1993 and 2015, Kreamer ran for city council of Aberdeen.

In 1998, 2002, 2006, 2010, 2014 and 2018 Democrats of Harford County elected Kreamer to the Democratic Central Committee with either the highest number or the second highest number of votes on the ten member board.

In 2002, Kreamer ran for District E of the Harford County Council to represent Aberdeen, Churchville, Hickory and Fountain Green. Kreamer was unopposed in the primary election, but ultimately lost to Richard Slutzky in the general election. In 2014, when Slutzky vacated his seat, Barbara Kreamer was the Democratic nominee for District E, now Aberdeen, Churchville and Fountain Green.

In 2009, Kreamer ran for Mayor of Aberdeen, but lost to Mike Bennett.

== Personal life ==
Kreamer was married for twenty-six years and had two children. She is the grandmother of four children.
