= Nancy Jacobs =

American politician (born 1951)

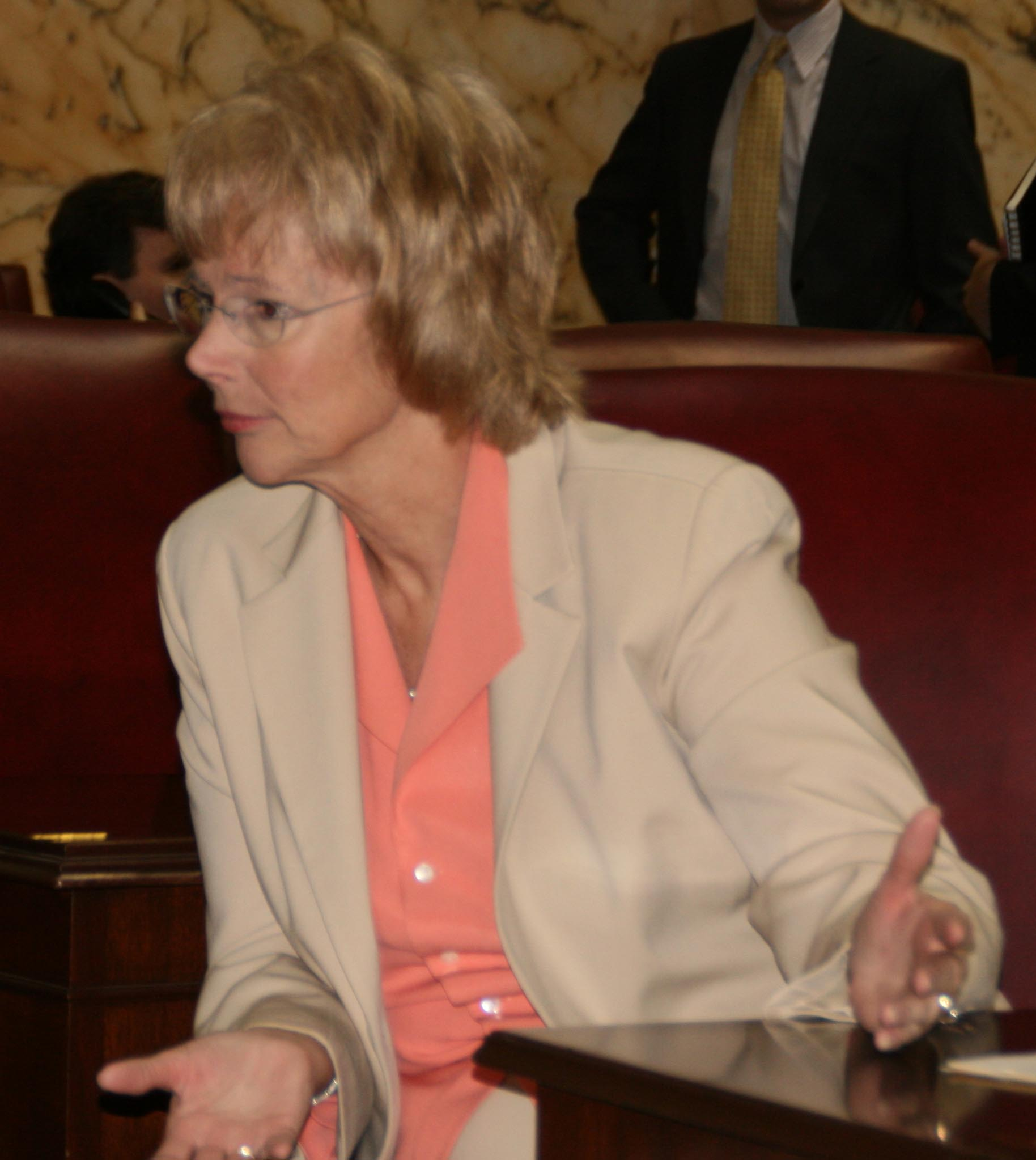

Member of the Maryland Senate from the 34th district
- In office January 13, 1999 – January 14, 2015
- Preceded by: David R. Craig
- Succeeded by: Robert G. Cassilly

Member of the Maryland House of Delegates from the 34th district
- In office January 11, 1995 – January 13, 1999
- Preceded by: David R. Craig
- Succeeded by: Charles R. Boutin

Personal details
- Born: October 27, 1951 (age 74) Charleston, West Virginia, U.S.
- Party: Republican
- Spouse: Bruce W. Jacobs

Nancy Jacobs (born October 27, 1951, in West Virginia) is a former Maryland State Senator representing District 34.

== Early life, education, and early career ==
Jacobs attended Bridgeport High School in Bridgeport, West Virginia. After high school, she attended West Virginia University, where she graduated in 1973 with a B.S. in journalism and speech.

After college, she began her career at WSLS-TV in Roanoke, Virginia. She became the owner and operator of West Shore Indoor Tennis Club, Edgewood, Maryland, where she worked until 1984. Then in 1985, Jacobs became the communications coordinator for the Maryland Concerned Women for America . She was also a realtor from 1987 until 1991.

== Maryland House of Delegates ==
=== Elections ===
In 1994, incumbent Republican State Delegate David R. Craig decided to retire in order to run for a seat in the Maryland Senate. Jacobs ran and ranked first place with 23% of the vote. The other two candidates who won the district were incumbent Democrats Rose Mary Hatem Bonsack (23%) and Mary Louise Preis (22%). In 1998, she decided to retire after one term to run for a seat in the State Senate.

=== Tenure ===
She was Minority Deputy Whip from 1997 until 1999.

=== Committee assignments ===
- House Judiciary Committee

== Maryland Senate ==
=== Elections ===
Jacobs was first elected to the Maryland State Senate in 1999 to represent District 34, which covers portions of Harford and Cecil County, Maryland. In 1998, she won the seat vacated by fellow Republican David R. Craig, who was the state senator for District 34 for only four years. Jacobs won a close election against Democratic challenger and former fellow Delegate Mary Louise Preis, whom she only defeated by 139 votes out of over 37,000 votes cast.

In 2002, the election was a different story. This time she won with over 60% of the vote, defeating Democrat Arthur Henry Helton, Jr. The election in 2006 was a little closer. That year she defeated Democrat William B. Kilby with 57% of the vote. In 2013 Jacobs declared to her supporters that she would not run for re-election in 2014.

=== Tenure ===
During the 2007 session of the Maryland General Assembly, Senator Jacobs sponsored Maryland's version of Jessica's Law. Her bill was passed by a 139–0 vote in the House and 43–3 in the Senate and has been signed into law by the governor.

She was elected Senate Minority Whip in 2009 and was the first woman in Maryland history to become the Senate Minority Leader in 2011. She retired from the Senate in 2015

=== Committee assignments ===
- Judicial Proceedings Committee
- Joint Committee on Children, Youth, and Families
- Joint Oversight Committee on the Department of Juvenile Services

== 2012 congressional election ==
After redistricting, Jacobs decided to run in the newly redrawn Maryland's 2nd congressional district and challenge incumbent Democratic U.S. Congressman Dutch Ruppersberger. She won the Republican primary in April with 62% of the vote. Ruppersberger defeated her 66%-31%.

== Electoral history ==
- 2006 Race for Maryland State Senate – District 34

Name	Votes	Percent	Outcome
Nancy Jacobs, Rep.	21,601	57.3%	Won
William B. Kilby, Dem.	16,108	42.7%	Lost
Other Write-Ins	18	0.0%	Lost

- 2002 Race for Maryland State Senate – District 34

Name	Votes	Percent	Outcome
Nancy Jacobs, Rep.	20,474	60.4%	Won
Arthur Henry Helton, Jr., Dem.	13,399	39.5%	Lost
Other Write-Ins	45	0.1%	Lost

- 1998 Race for Maryland State Senate – District 34

Name	Votes	Percent	Outcome
Nancy Jacobs, Rep.	18,996	50%	Won
Mary Louise Preis, Dem.	18,857	50%	Lost
Other Write-Ins	45	0.1%	Lost

- 1994 Race for Maryland House of Delegates – District 34

Voters choose three:

Name	Votes	Percent	Outcome
Nancy Jacobs, Rep.	18,091	20%	Won
Rose Mary Hatem Bonsack, Dem.	17,762	20%	Won
Mary Louise Preis, Dem.	17,380	19%	Won
B. Daniel Riley, Dem.	13,891	15%	Lost
Scott Williams, Rep.	12,362	14%	Lost
Kenneth A. Thompson, Rep.	10,576	12%	Lost
