= Michael Geppi =

Michael A. Geppi

Harford County Council District C
- In office December 7, 1998 – December 2, 2002
- Preceded by: Mark Decker
- Succeeded by: Robert Cassilly

Personal details
- Born: Towson, Maryland
- Party: Republican

Michael Geppi is CEO of Timbre Technologies, Inc. He is a serial entrepreneur, focusing on highly disruptive technology. Geppi is a former member of the County Council of Harford County, Maryland and served as Maryland's Deputy Secretary of Health under Governor Larry Hogan.

== Education ==
Michael Geppi attended North Harford High School, graduating in 1993. He received his B.S. from Towson University in 1997, then his M.P.A. in 2004 from the University of Delaware. Geppi later earned an MBA from the Robert H. Smith School of Business at the University of Maryland.

== Political career ==
Geppi was elected to the Harford County Council from District C in 1998. At the time, he was 23 years of age and is the youngest person to ever have been elected in the history of Harford County. Geppi served as Chairman of the Harford County Republican Party from 2006 to 2008. He also served as a vice chairman of the Maryland Republican Party and was a Delegate to the Republican National Convention in 2008.

== Teaching career ==
Geppi has been a faculty member at the Robert H. Smith School of Business at the University of Maryland since 2012. Geppi abruptly abandoned his teaching position mid semester to pursue his political career. He offered his students positions for the "Geppi Group".

== Notes and references ==
- https://www.rhsmith.umd.edu/faculty-research/academic-departments/management-organization/faculty/faculty-list/adjunct-faculty
- http://msa.maryland.gov/msa/mdmanual/40party/html/repc.html#2008
