= David R. Craig =

American politician (born 1949)

David Craig
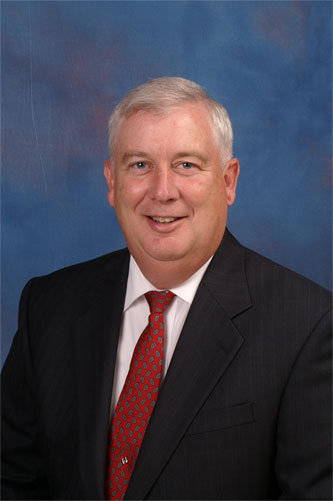
- Craig (c. 2011)

Secretary of the Maryland Department of Planning
- In office February 1, 2015 – July 28, 2016
- Preceded by: Richard Eberhart Hall
- Succeeded by: Wendi W. Peters

6th Executive of Harford County
- In office July 7, 2005 – December 1, 2014
- Preceded by: James Harkins
- Succeeded by: Barry Glassman

34th Mayor of Havre de Grace
- In office 2001–2005

Member of the Maryland Senate from the 34th district
- In office 1995–1999
- Preceded by: Habern W. Freeman
- Succeeded by: Nancy Jacobs

Member of the Maryland House of Delegates from the 34th district
- In office 1991–1994
- Preceded by: Barbara Osborn Kreamer
- Succeeded by: David D. Rudolph

31st Mayor of Havre de Grace
- In office 1985–1989

Member of the Havre de Grace City Council
- In office 1979–1985

Personal details
- Born: June 12, 1949 (age 77) Havre de Grace, Maryland, U.S.
- Party: Republican
- Spouse: Melinda Lee Blevins (m. 1971)
- Children: 3
- Education: Towson University (B.S.); Morgan State University

David R. Craig (born June 12, 1949) is an American Republican Party politician from the State of Maryland who unsuccessfully sought the Republican nomination for governor of Maryland in 2014. He was appointed, and sworn in as Harford County Executive on July 7, 2005. Craig was elected in 2006 and re-elected in 2010. Craig previously served in the Maryland State Senate from 1995 to 1999, representing Harford County, and from 1990 to 1994 in the Maryland House of Delegates. He was also elected mayor of Havre de Grace from 1985 to 1989, and 2001 to 2005. Craig was a teacher and assistant principal in the Harford County Public School System for 34 years.

== Early life and education ==
Craig was born in 1949 in Havre de Grace, Maryland, to Joseph E. Craig (1917–2011). He graduated Havre de Grace High School in 1967, and obtained a B.S. in History from Towson University in 1971 and a master's degree from Morgan State University.

== Personal life ==
Craig married his high school sweetheart, Melinda Lee Blevins, in 1971. They have three children and nine grandchildren.

== Teaching career ==
Craig spent 34 years in the Harford County Public School System as a teacher and assistant principal. He began teaching in 1971 at Edgewood Junior High School. He then taught at Havre de Grace Community School for seven years, and later at Magnolia Middle School, Aberdeen High School, and Edgewood High School.

== Political career ==
=== Local government ===
Craig began his political career serving on the Havre de Grace City Council. Beginning in 1979, he was elected to three consecutive two-year terms. He was elected mayor of Havre de Grace from 1985 to 1989 and 2001 to 2005. He resigned upon being sworn in as the Harford County Executive.

=== Maryland House of Delegates ===
Craig was elected to the Maryland House of Delegates in 1990, representing District 34 (Harford County). He was a member of the Constitutional and Administrative Law Committee, 1991–92; Ways and Means Committee, 1992–93 (education subcommittee); and Commerce and Government Matters Committee, 1994. He was the vice chair of the Harford County Delegation in 1993.

=== Maryland State Senate ===
Craig was elected to the Maryland Senate in 1994 and served until 1999, representing District 34 (Harford County). He was a member of the Joint Committee to Study Mandates on Local Government, 1995–97; Economic and Environmental Affairs Committee, 1995–99 (education subcommittee; health subcommittee); Executive Nominations Committee, 1995–99; Joint Committee on Legislative Ethics, 1995–99; and Joint Committee on Protocol. He was the chair of the Harford County Delegation, 1998–99.

=== Harford County Executive ===
Craig ran for Harford County Executive in 1998 against then-Delegate James Harkins. Harkins defeated Craig in the Republican primary and was subsequently re-elected in 2002. Harkins resigned as County Executive to become Director of Maryland Environmental Service in 2005, and Craig was appointed by the County Council to fulfill the term. Craig was then elected as County Executive in 2006 and 2010. As mayor of Havre de Grace, Craig was elected president of the Maryland Municipal League (MML) in 2005, and in 2010 as County Executive, he was elected by his peers as president of the Maryland Association of Counties (MACo). He is the first elected official to have served as president of both organizations.

== 2014 Maryland gubernatorial candidacy ==
David Craig announced his candidacy for governor of Maryland on July 3, 2013. His position platform included phasing out the income tax in Maryland. He was defeated by Larry Hogan in the Republican gubernatorial primary on June 24, 2014.

== Election results ==
- 2006 race for Harford County Executive - Harford County

Voters to choose one:

Name	Votes	Percent	Outcome
David R. Craig, Rep.	46,121	52%	Won
Ann C. Helton, Dem.	42,442	47.9%	Lost
Write-ins	75	0.1%	Lost

- 1998 race for Harford County Executive - Harford County - Republican primary

Voters to choose one:

Name	Votes	Percent	Outcome
James Harkins, Rep.	8,324	56%	Won
David R. Craig, Rep.	6,378	43%	Lost
Vedell Pace, Rep.	184	1%	Lost

- 1994 race for Maryland State Senate – District 34 - Harford County

Voters to choose one:

Name	Votes	Percent	Outcome
David R. Craig, Rep.	17,444	54%	Won
Habern W. Freeman, Dem.	14,676	46%	Lost

- 1990 race for Maryland House of Delegates – District 34 - Harford County

Voters to choose three:

Name	Votes	Percent	Outcome
Rose Mary Hatem Bonsack, Dem.	13,373	19%	Won
Mary Louise Preis, Dem.	13,045	19%	Won
David R. Craig, Rep.	12,031	18%	Won
William H. Cox Jr., Dem.	10,296	15%	Lost
David M. Meadows, Rep.	10,069	15%	Lost
Cecil W. Wood, Rep.	9,840	14%	Lost

== Legacy ==
The David Craig Park on Saint John Street in Havre de Grace was named after him.
