= Victor Martinez Hernandez =

Salvadoran criminal (born 2000)

- Born: Victor Antonio Martinez Hernandez; September 19, 2000 (age 26); El Salvador
- Known for: Murdering Rachel Morin
- Children: 1
- Status: Imprisoned
- Penalty: Two back-to-back life sentences plus 40 years in prison

Details
- Locations: El Salvador; United States
- Date apprehended: June 14, 2024

Victor Antonio Martinez Hernandez (born September 19, 2000) is a Salvadoran murderer. After an arrest warrant was issued against him for suspected murder in El Salvador, he illegally immigrated to the United States in February 2023 and raped and murdered Rachel Hannah Morin (May 20, 1986 – August 5, 2023) along the Ma and Pa Trail in Bel Air, Maryland. His trial began on April 1, 2025, and he was found guilty 14 days later; he was sentenced to two back-to-back life sentences plus 40 years on August 11.

== Biography ==
Victor Antonio Martinez Hernandez was born on September 19, 2000. He has one daughter.

== El Salvador ==
An arrest warrant was issued for Martinez Hernandez in January 2023, after he was accused of murdering a young woman.

== United States ==
Doorbell camera footage of Martinez Hernandez leaving the scene of a March 2023 home invasion in Los Angeles. After the murder of Morin was tied to the invasion, this video was used to help identify the suspect.

Martinez Hernandez had been arrested by the U.S. Border Patrol and deported under Title 42 three times in early 2023: on January 19 and February 6 near Santa Teresa, New Mexico; and on January 31 near El Paso, Texas. According to U.S. Immigration and Customs Enforcement, Martinez Hernandez successfully illegally immigrated near El Paso on February 13.

According to investigators, Hernandez assaulted a nine-year-old and her mother during a home invasion in Los Angeles on March 26.

== Murder of Rachel Morin ==
Murder of Rachel Morin
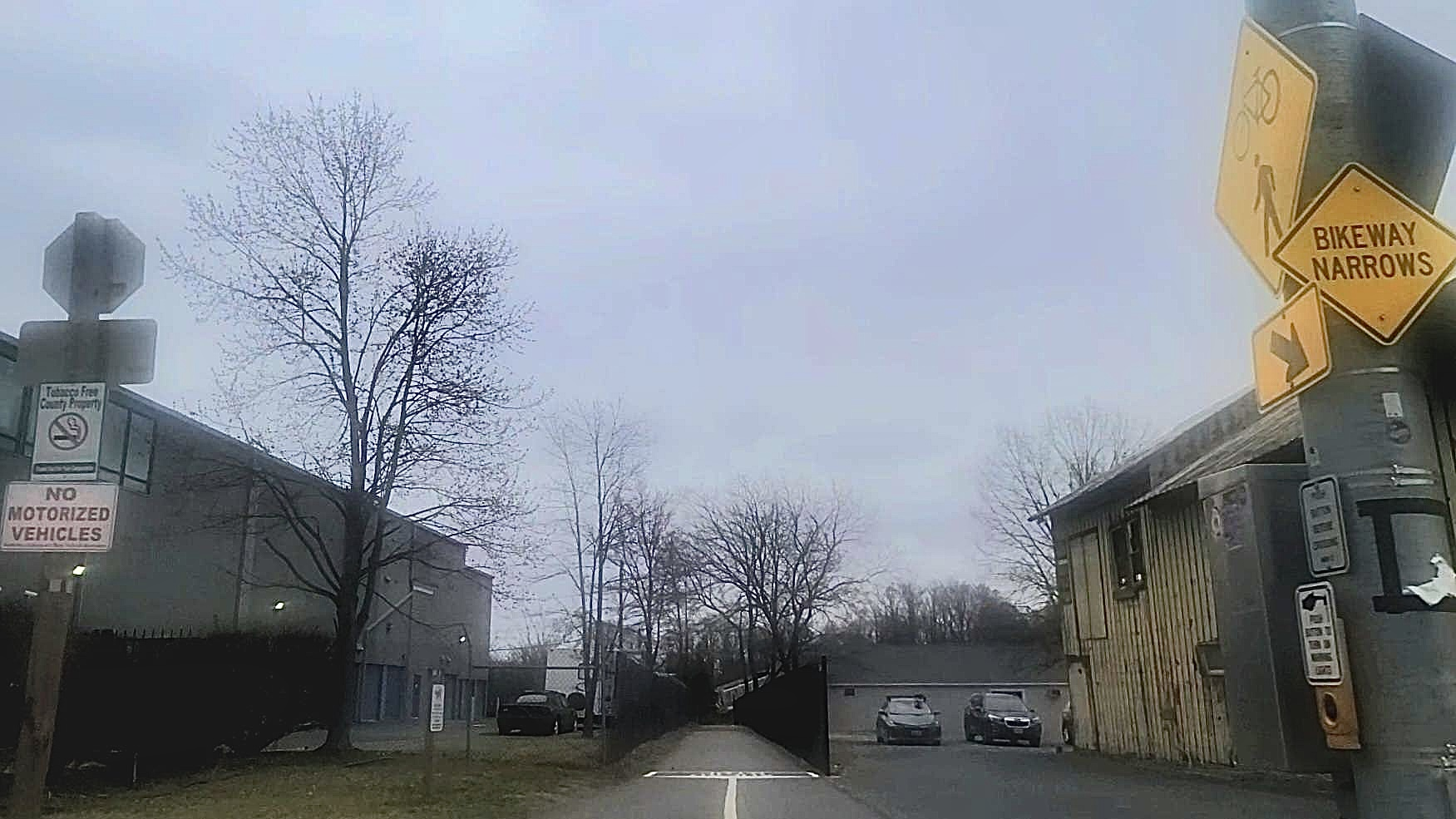
- Morin was murdered along the Ma and Pa Trail.
- Location: Ma and Pa Trail; Bel Air, Maryland
- Date: August 5, 2023
- Deaths: Morin
- Verdict: Guilty
- Convicted: Martinez Hernandez
- Judge: Yolanda Curtin (Note: Also spelled "Curtain")

=== Victim ===
Undated photo of Morin

Rachel Hannah Morin was born on May 20, 1986. She owned a house cleaning business and had five children. She announced a relationship with Richard Tobin through Facebook on August 1, roughly five days before the murder. Morin's 5-month-old niece died of sudden infant death syndrome the week before her murder.

=== Murder ===
According to the Harford County Sheriff's Office (HCSO) and Tobin, Morin went to the Ma and Pa Trail in Bel Air, Maryland, around 6:58 p.m. on August 5, 2023. Per Morin's phone and smartwatch, she was murdered between 7:04 and 7:10. Tobin reported her missing around 11:20 p.m., when she failed to return home.

Her car was found at the Ma and Pa trailhead the next day. A volunteer called 911 at 1:07 p.m. after discovering her body. The HCSO confirmed that the body was Morin's on August 8.

=== Aftermath ===
After Morin's murder, the Harford County Sheriff’s Office increased patrols of the trail. Gahler denied that there was a public threat and encouraged people on the trail to be aware of their surroundings. Morin's sister Rebekah made a GoFundMe for her funeral, saying that "this was not an accidentally [sic] death, and she did not go willingly and she deserves a funeral worthy of her her beauty." By August 9, the GoFundMe had raised US$40,007 of its $65,000 goal. Tobin, who had a criminal record, denied responsibility for the murder, attributing the record to a previous drug addiction and stating he had not used drugs in 15 months.

On August 8, Harford County councilwoman Jessica Boyle-Tsottles organized the Women's Walk Along, a community walk along the Ma and Pa Trail to commemorate Morin. Morin's family did not wish to be affiliated with the walk; while Boyle-Tsottles acknowledged their wishes, stating that she "had absolutely no intentions of upsetting the family or anyone that's involved in this terrible tragedy," the walk was still held and attended by dozens. Morin's family later announced their intention to hold a celebration of her life and a 5K run to commemorate her.

Morin's family held a walk of the Ma and Pa Trail, known as the "Trail of Life," on August 19, with flowers and candles placed around the trail. A nearby cupcake shop held a fundraiser on the same day, where 20% of their sales for the day were donated to Rebekah's GoFundMe. The walk began at 11:30 a.m. and was attended by hundreds. During the walk, walkers performed Save a Place for Me, a song by Matthew West.

It's got to be done right. I could throw up some temporary cameras to give a feel-good. This isn't about just making people feel good. This is about providing real security.

— Harford County executive Robert Cassilly

On August 16, Harford County executive Robert Cassilly announced plans to install cameras along the Ma and Pa Trail, working with Baltimore Gas and Electric and contractors to draft plans. While the cameras may have required approval from the Harford County Council depending on the cost, Cassilly said he was "confident the council members would support this".

==== Appearances by Morin's family ====
External videos
- Michael Morin speaking at the 2024 Republican National Convention

Michael Morin, Rachel's brother, addressed the 2024 Republican National Convention on July 17. During the address, he criticized Biden's immigration policy, saying that Rachel's murder was avoidable and that Trump would be a better president.

=== Investigation ===
==== Early investigation ====
The case was investigated as a homicide; Gahler cited unspecified indicators at the scene that showed "no doubt" that the death was a homicide. No suspect was immediately identified and it was unclear whether the attack was targeted. Investigators had received over 200 tips by August 11. 10 investigators were assigned to the case, who interviewed Tobin and other friends of Morin. Tobin surrendered his phone and a DNA sample to the investigators. A group of people (Note: It is unclear if the group comprised three men and two women or three women and two men.) who were on the trail when the murder happened were identified and questioned.

==== Identification of suspect ====
The suspect's DNA was extracted from Morin's body and submitted into the Combined DNA Index System, where it matched with the home invasion in Los Angeles. After the match was found, doorbell camera footage of Martinez Hernandez leaving the home after the invasion was released. William Davis, the chief deputy of the Harford County Sheriff's Office, said Martinez Hernandez had likely worked alone in a random attack, warning that the video was not recent and Martinez Hernandez's appearance may have changed. Detectives described Martinez Hernandez as a muscular Hispanic male who was 5-foot-9-inch (1.75 m) tall, weighed 160 pounds, had dark hair, and was 20 to 30 years old.

After the footage was released, Tobin wrote on his Facebook that he "hope[d] they found this scum of the Earth". Gahler warned that Martinez Hernandez had an "absolute disregard" for lives and would likely kill again if not caught. Metro Crime Stoppers offered a US$2,000 reward for information leading to an arrest; the HCSO increased the reward to $10,000 on August 24.

External image
- Posters of potential traits of Martinez Hernandez

After the DNA match was made, Morin's family worked with criminal profiler Pat Brown to determine potential traits of Martinez Hernandez. After traits were identified, Brown made posters in English and Spanish; thousands of posters were sent to Los Angeles.

The HCSO released a sketch of Martinez Hernandez.

==== Arrest of Martinez Hernandez ====
This crazy immigration policy is really evil and allowed this terrible guy to come in here and destroy this for so many people and especially the Morin family. We've got to stop this. We've got to reverse the idiocy that is our current border policies. Start by catching the criminals. We can't possibly police this country with a totally porous border on our southern end.

— Harford County executive Robert Cassilly after Martinez Hernandez's arrest

According to Gahler, investigators found a lead for Martinez Hernandez through genetic genealogy on May 20, 2024, which would have been Morin's 38th birthday. Gahler described the discovery as "a poetic coincidence or perhaps Rachel's own divine assistance." Martinez Hernandez was arrested at a Tulsa, Oklahoma, bar on June 14. Martinez Hernandez lied to arresting officers about his identity and activities.

Martinez Hernandez was extradited to Maryland on June 18. He was sent on a plane from Oklahoma to Martin State Airport and then driven to the Harford County Detention Center. After the extradition, county executive Robert Cassilly criticized the immigration policy of the Joe Biden administration, while Gahler said he felt a "continued sense of relief that this monster poses no threat to our Harford County community or any community in the world." Maryland governor Wes Moore said that "we have an immigration policy that needed to have been dealt with and was not." Donald Trump, who was then the presumptive Republican nominee in the 2024 U.S. presidential election, called Rachel's mother Patty to offer his condolences.

== Trial ==
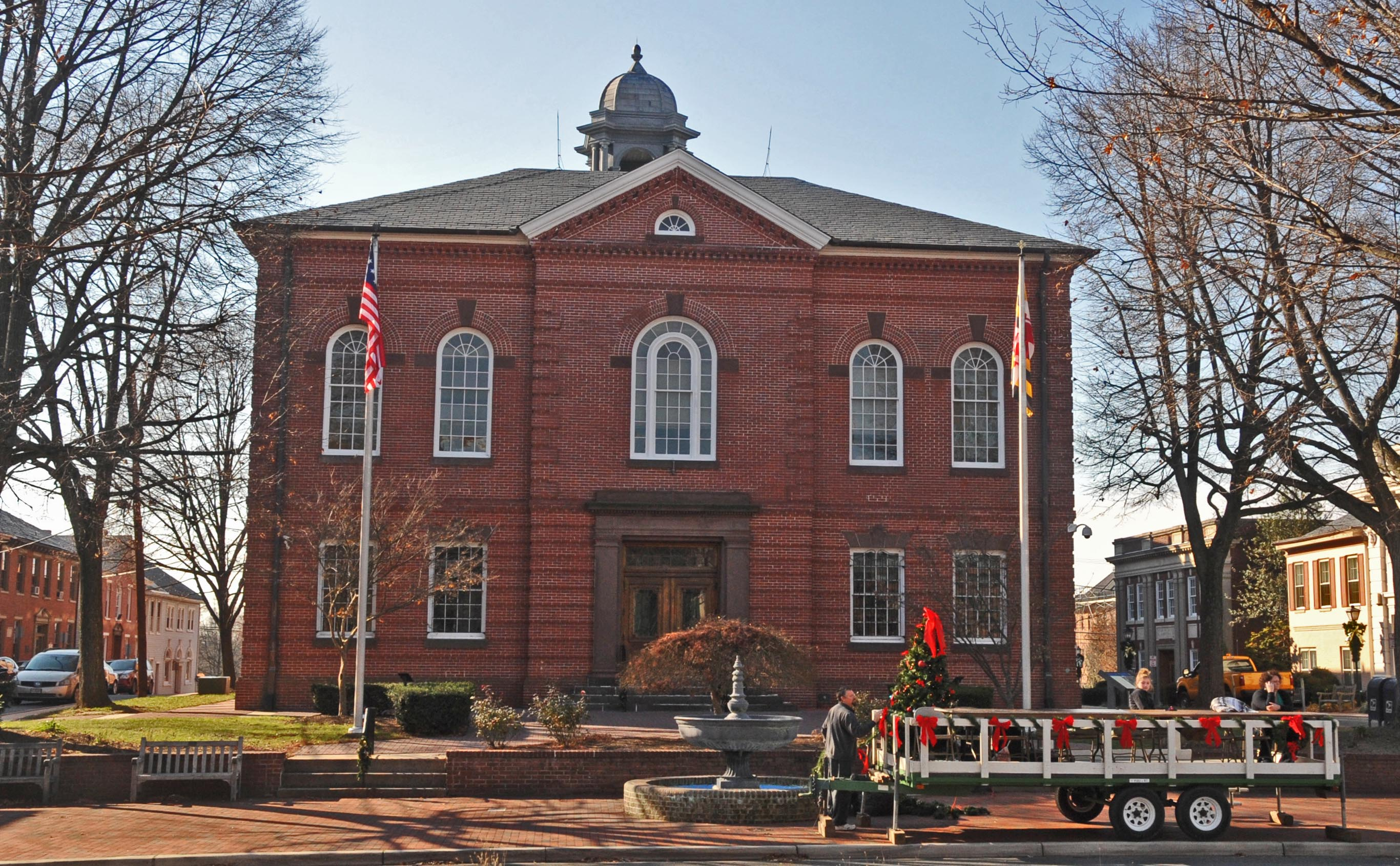
The Harford County courthouse, where the trial was held, 2007

=== Preparations ===
Martinez Hernandez's trial was set to begin on April 1, 2025. A judge denied Martinez Hernandez's request to move the trial from Harford County on January 31, where he claimed that a fair trial would not be possible due to the political tensions around the murder.

Patty Morin hired Randolph Rice as her attorney. Rice was accused of undermining jury selection by repeatedly speaking to the press about the trial on March 31; Judge Yolanda Curtin, the defense, and the prosecution all asked Rice to stop speaking publicly about the case, which he ignored. Martinez Hernandez was represented by three public defenders: Sawyer Hicks, Marcus Jenkins, and Tara LeCompte.

Before the trial, the Bel Air Police Department increased security around the courthouse and closed Courtland and Office streets, which surrounded the entrances to the courthouse, to vehicles. During a pre-trial hearing on March 31, Martinez Hernandez's defenders voiced concerns that jurors knowing of his other suspected crimes and illegal immigration would cause bias against him and requested that Curtin provide a detailed description of the case to potential jurors. Curtin denied their request, believing that a simple description would be sufficient. Curtin also denied requests from the defense to sequester the jury, believing it would be excessive and hard to enforce, and to require extra questions for the jurors, most of which she described as redundant, while some were "fishing expeditions." She was undecided whether jurors should be asked if they watched the 2024 Republican National Convention.

=== Jury selection ===
Jury selection started in the morning of April 1, and was set to last until April 4. Curtin planned to call 120 to 130 jurors per day due to the high profile of the case and select 18 jurors. (Note: Curtin planned to select 12 jurors and six alternatives, in case a juror was disqualified or was unable to attend.) When jury selection began, Martinez Hernandez was shackled and in a jumpsuit. Two interpreters translated the proceedings for Martinez Hernandez. Curtin announced the conclusion of general questioning around 12:25 p.m. EDT, and began individual questioning in private after the jurors returned from lunch at 1:15 p.m. The first day of selection adjourned around 7:45 p.m., which saw 59 of 124 potential jurors eliminated.

Curtin denied Morin's family and the press access to the first day of selection, citing a maximum capacity of 124 in the courthouse; 125 were inside the building. A live stream was not available. Per the Maryland Court of Appeals ruling in Watters v. State, blocking the public from watching jury selection violates the Sixth Amendment to the United States Constitution. The Baltimore Banner reporter Dylan Segelbaum criticized the Maryland judiciary office for failing to accommodate spectators, despite the trial's date being set months before. Reporters were later allowed to sit on the courtroom steps to listen to selection.

On the second day, 60 potential jurors were questioned. Curtin ordered that space be made for reporters, and audio of the selection was transmitted to an overflow room. Reporters were not allowed to report on the case while inside the courthouse. By the end of the questioning, there were 79 candidates, which Curtin declared sufficient to select a jury. The jury was seated by 3 p.m., and proceedings were set to begin on April 4. The jury had 14 men and four women, of which five were of color. (Note: The main jury had 10 men and two women, of which two were of color; the alternatives were four men and two women, of which three were of color.) It was unclear if any of the jury were Latino.

=== Proceedings ===
After the jury was selected, proceedings began on April 4. As capital punishment is abolished in Maryland, the prosecution sought life in prison without the possibility of parole for Martinez Hernandez.

Both sides gave opening statements on April 4. The defense warned the jury to be impartial and denied Martinez Hernandez's involvement in the murder. They said that Morin had "attracted male attention" and questioned Tobin, who they claimed had sex with Morin on the day of the murder.

After the defense, one of Morin's daughters spoke and recounted the day of her murder. Tobin then spoke, where he said that after Morin stopped responding to his texts, he searched her home, the trail, and nearby restaurants. After he failed to find her, he called 911. He spoke with officers that night, and said that he "freaked out, screamed, and cried" when he learned of the murder.

The volunteer who found Morin's body also gave a statement. He said that after locating a "deer path" off the trail, he found a rock covered in blood, and found her body in a storm drain. He said her injuries "looked bad" and he could not recognize her face.

On April 14, after less than 50 minutes of deliberation, Martinez Hernandez was found guilty of first-degree murder, first-degree rape, third-degree sexual assault, and kidnapping. After the verdict, Harford County state's attorney Alison Healey said that prosecutors will seek the maximum sentence at sentencing. On August 11, Hernandez Martinez received two back-to-back life sentences for murder and rape and a further 40 years for sexual assault and kidnapping. As Maryland judges lack authority to imprison criminals outside of the state, he will serve his sentence in Maryland and not be returned to El Salvador.

== See also ==
- Murder of Jamiel Shaw II
- Killing of Kate Steinle
- Murder of Mollie Tibbetts
- Murder of Joshua Wilkerson
- Murder of Laken Riley
- Killing of Jocelyn Nungaray
- Immigration and crime
- Remembrance Project
