= Catherine Riley =

American politician (1947–2024)

Catherine I. Riley

Chair of the Maryland Public Service Commission
- In office November 1, 2000 – June 30, 2003
- Preceded by: Glenn Ivey
- Succeeded by: Kenneth D. Schisler

Member of the Maryland Senate from the 34th district
- In office 1983–1990
- Preceded by: Walter M. Baker
- Succeeded by: Habern W. Freeman

Member of the Maryland House of Delegates from the 6th district
- In office 1975–1982 Serving with George B. Adams Jr. and William H. Cox Jr.
- Succeeded by: redistricting

Personal details
- Born: March 21, 1947 Harford County, Maryland, U.S.
- Died: September 30, 2024 (aged 77)
- Party: Democratic
- Education: Towson State College (BS)
- Occupation: Politician; lobbyist; civil servant

Catherine I. Riley (March 21, 1947 – September 30, 2024) was an American lobbyist, civil servant and politician from Maryland. She represented Harford County in the Maryland House of Delegates from 1975 to 1982 and in the Maryland Senate from 1983 to 1990.

== Early life ==
Catherine I. Riley was born in Harford County, Maryland, on March 21, 1947. She attended parochial schools in Bel Air. She graduated in 1969 with a Bachelor of Science from Towson State College.

== Career ==
Riley served in Maryland House of Delegates representing District 6 from 1975 to 1982. She also represented District 34 in the Maryland Senate from 1983 to 1990. She ran as a Democrat.

In 1995, Governor Parris Glendening hired Riley to his legislative lobbying team. She continued in that role and was appointed by Glendening to serve on the Maryland Public Service Commission on May 21, 1999. She was appointed head of the Commission on October 18, 2000 by Glendening after Glenn Ivey announced he was stepping down. She served in that role until 2003.

== Personal life and death ==
Riley was friends with fellow senator Thomas V. Miller Jr. She died on September 30, 2024, at the age of 77.
