= Habern W. Freeman =

American politician

Habern William Freeman

Member of the Maryland Senate from the 34th district
- In office 1991–1995
- Preceded by: Catherine Riley
- Succeeded by: David R. Craig

3rd Executive of Harford County
- In office 1982–1990
- Preceded by: J. Thomas Barranger
- Succeeded by: Eileen M. Rehrmann

Personal details
- Born: August 10, 1941 (age 85) Baltimore, Maryland, U.S.
- Party: Democratic
- Education: Lock Haven State College; University of Maryland

Habern William Freeman (born August 10, 1941) is a Democratic politician from the State of Maryland, having served Harford County in several different elected positions, including Harford County Executive and State Senator.

== Education ==
Freeman graduated in 1962 with a bachelor's degree from Lock Haven State College, now Lock Haven University of Pennsylvania. In 1964, Freeman received his physical therapy certification from the University of Maryland.

== Political career ==
Habern Freeman was elected to the Harford County Council in 1972 and served as its president from 1974 until 1978. In 1982 Freeman was elected as the third county executive of Harford County and served until 1990, when he was succeeded by Eileen M. Rehrmann.

After serving as County Executive, Habern Freeman was elected in 1990 to State Senator serving District 34, running unopposed. Freeman served as state senator until 1994. During his time in the State Senate, he served as a member of the Judicial Proceedings Committee and in 1991 and 1992 served on the Special Joint Committee on Pensions. In 1994, Habern was defeated by David R. Craig, who later also became a County Executive for Harford County.

== Election results ==
- 1994 Race for Maryland State Senate – District 34

Voters to choose one:

Name	Votes	Percent	Outcome
David R. Craig, Rep.	17,444	54%	Won
Habern W. Freeman, Dem.	14,676	46%	Lost

- 1990 Race for Maryland State Senate – District 34

Voters to choose one:

Name	Votes	Percent	Outcome
Habern W. Freeman, Dem.	19,050	100%	Won
