= Rose Mary Hatem Bonsack =

American politician (1933–2020)

Member of the Maryland House of Delegates from the 34th district
- In office January 9, 1991 – January 13, 1999
- Preceded by: B. Daniel Riley
- Succeeded by: Charles R. Boutin
- Constituency: Harford County

Personal details
- Born: Rose Mary Hatem; October 24, 1933 Havre de Grace, Maryland, U.S.
- Died: September 27, 2020 (aged 86) Havre de Grace, Maryland, U.S.
- Resting place: Mt. Erin Cemetery; Havre de Grace, Maryland, U.S.
- Party: Democratic
- Spouse: James Bonsack
- Children: 5
- Education: University of Maryland Medical School
- Alma mater: Washington College (BS); Medical College of Pennsylvania
- Occupation: Politician; physician

Rose Mary Hatem Bonsack (October 24, 1933 – September 27, 2020) was an American politician and physician who represented the 34th district in the Maryland House of Delegates from 1991 to 1999.

== Early life ==
Rose Mary Hatem was born on October 24, 1933, in Havre de Grace, Maryland, to Nasma and Joseph Hatem. She was a third generation Lebanese American.

She graduated from Washington College with a Bachelor of Science degree, cum laude in 1955. She attended the University of Maryland Medical School and in 1960, she received her M.D. from the Medical College of Pennsylvania.

== Career ==
She worked as a physician. She worked as a member of a member of the medical and surgical faculty of the state of Maryland from 1961 to 2020. She was president of the Maryland Academy of Family Physicians, serving from 1989 until 1990.

Hatem Bonsack served in the Maryland House of Delegates, representing District 34, from 1991 to 1999. She was a member of the Environmental Matters Committee from 1991 until 1994, and the Joint Committee on Health Care Delivery and Financing from 1993 until 1999. She was also vice-chair of the Rules and Executive Nominations Committee from 1994 until 1999. Finally, she was chair of the Harford County Delegation in 1994 and again from 1998 until 1999.

== Personal life ==
She married James Bonsack. They had two daughters and three sons.

She died on September 27, 2020, in Havre de Grace, Maryland at age 86. She was buried at Mt. Erin Cemetery in Havre de Grace.

== Election results ==
- 1994 Race for Maryland House of Delegates – District 34

Voters choose three:

Name	Votes	Percent	Outcome
Nancy Jacobs, Rep.	18,091	20%	Won
Rose Mary Hatem Bonsack, Dem.	17,762	20%	Won
Mary Louise Preis, Dem.	17,380	19%	Won
B. Daniel Riley, Dem.	13,891	15%	Lost
Scott Williams, Rep.	12,362	14%	Lost
Kenneth A. Thompson, Rep.	10,576	12%	Lost

- 1990 Race for Maryland House of Delegates – District 34 - Harford County

Voters to choose three:

Name	Votes	Percent	Outcome
Rose Mary Hatem Bonsack, Dem.	13,373	19%	Won
Mary Louise Preis, Dem.	13,045	19%	Won
David R. Craig, Rep.	12,031	18%	Won
William H. Cox Jr., Dem.	10,296	15%	Lost
David M. Meadows, Rep.	10,069	15%	Lost
Cecil W. Wood, Rep.	9,840	14%	Lost
