= Ma and Pa Trail =

Rail trail in Maryland, US

Coordinates: 39°32′2.2″N 76°21′50.08″W

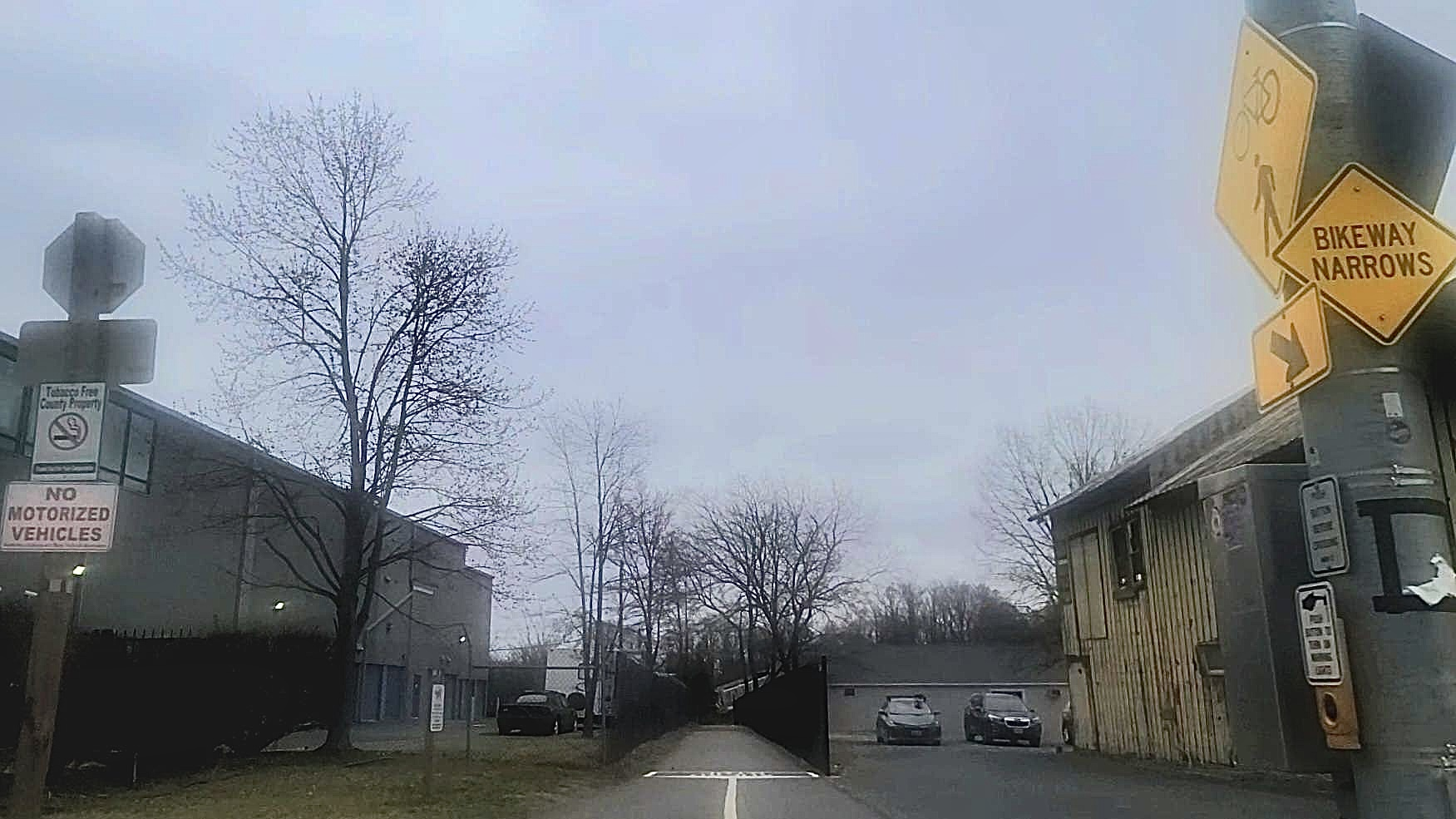
- The Ma and Pa Trail in Bel Air, viewed from North Main Street
- Length: 6.25 mi (10.06 km)
- Location: Harford County, Maryland, USA
- Trailheads: Williams Street, Equestrian Center; Friends Park, Melrose Lane
- Use: Hiking, bicycling, horseback riding
- Difficulty: Easy
- Season: All year
- Sights: Heavenly Waters Park, Friends Park, Bel Air
- Hazards: Grade Shifts, Tunnels

The Ma and Pa Trail is a 6.25-mile (10.1 km) multi-purpose rail trail that follows the path of the old Ma and Pa Railroad through Harford County, Maryland. It contains three linked trails, one unconnected, with plans to bridge the gap in the middle, bringing the total length to 10 miles (16 km). Both links of the trail have a variety of trail surfaces (paved, larger gravel, finer gravel), have few steep hills or hazards, and contain overlooks and bridges when necessary.

The Bel Air Trail is a 2.5-mile (4.0 km) trail that runs from Williams Street in downtown to the Equestrian Center on the other side of the bypass. It passes underneath of the Maryland Route 24 (MD 24) highway, the U.S. Route 1 (US 1) bypass, and crosses Tollgate Road, where it meets the Fallston Trail. Spurs off of it connect to the Harford Mall and Liriodendron mansion, and branches out to a dog park at the end. It serves as a shortcut across town, rather than walking along highways, and contains several bridges across branches of the creek while cutting through the forested Heavenly Waters Park. Bathrooms and parking are available at each end of the trail. Horses and dogs are permitted on the Bel Air link of the path.

The Fallston Link is a 2-mile (3.2 km) segment dedicated on June 7, 2008, that runs from the Equestrian Center to the Edgeley Grove Farm area of Fallston.

The Forest Hill Trail is a third, 1.75-mile (2.8 km) link of the trail running from the duckpond at Friends Park to Melrose Lane. A tunnel is located at MD 23, but passes over a development street on the north end. Bathrooms and parking are located at each end. Dogs are allowed on the Forest Hill link, but horses are not.

As of late 2020, final preparations for construction to link the two routes into one continuous trail is underway. At the time of the original constructions, a tunnel was built underneath of US 1 in preparation, but it is unconnected to any path system. Construction for an extension from Bel Air to the Edgeley Grove area in Fallston is planned, and a 4.1-mile (6.6 km) northern link at Dooley Road, near the state line in Cardiff is under study.

== Notable incidents ==
=== Murder of Rachel Morin ===
On Saturday, August 5, 2023 at around 6:00pm, single mother of five Rachel Morin, 37, went for a walk on the Ma and Pa Trail as part of her regular exercise routine and failed to return. At 11:20pm, her boyfriend, Richard Tobin, reported her missing and search efforts went underway. Less than 24 hours later her body was discovered just off Williams St. and Ellendale St. parking lot.

On June 14, 2024, 23-year-old El Salvador native Victor Martinez Hernandez was arrested in Tulsa, Oklahoma and charged with first- and second-degree murder, rape, and assault of Morin, after investigators identified his DNA on Morin's body. He was extradited to Harford County six days later and indicted by a grand jury on July 2.
