= Wade Kach =

American politician (born 1947)

Member of the Baltimore County Council from District 3
- In office December 1, 2014 – May 7, 2026
- Preceded by: Todd Huff
- Succeeded by: Nino Mangione

Member of the Maryland House of Delegates
- In office January 8, 1975 – November 30, 2014
- Succeeded by: Chris Cavey
- Constituency: District 11 (1975–1983); District 10 (1983–1995); District 9A (1995-2003); District 5B (2003-2014)

Personal details
- Born: July 19, 1947 (age 79) Baltimore, Maryland, U.S.
- Party: Republican
- Spouse: Evelyn
- Profession: Retired Baltimore County teacher and auditor

A. Wade Kach (born July 19, 1947) is an American politician who was member of the Baltimore County Council.

== Early life and education ==
Kach was born in Baltimore, Maryland, on July 19, 1947. He attended public schools in Baltimore, including Baltimore Polytechnic Institute. He began college at Towson University before settling at Western Maryland College, now McDaniel College, where he received his B.A. in 1970. Early in life, Kach began to work for his conservative principles, chairing the Maryland Federation of College Republicans in 1970.

== Career ==
Kach started his career as a middle school math teacher in Baltimore County Public Schools. After 22 years in the classroom, he transitioned to the Audit Office of the school system, reviewing the spending of all schools in the county.

He was a member of the Republican State Central Committee in Baltimore from 1970-73. He was first elected as a member of the Maryland House of Delegates in 1975. Since then, he was elected as a delegate to the Republican National Convention in 1988 and 2000.

He is a member of the Baltimore County Council, representing the Third District. He won with over 60% of the vote in both the primary and general elections in 2014, unseating incumbent Councilman Todd Huff (R) and defeating Laurie Taylor-Mitchell (D). In 2018, Kach was re-elected to the Council. As a member of the Maryland House of Delegates, he represented District 5B, part of Baltimore County, Maryland, for 40 years up to 2014. He won 98.9% of the vote in 2006 while running unopposed. In 2002 he defeated Democrat Stephen C. Kirsh and Independent William T. Newton with 71.2% of the vote in the new 5B District.

From 1994 to 2002, his district was 9A, which he represented with fellow Republican Martha Scanlan Klima. Again, they both defeated Stephen C. Kirsch. Prior to 1994, Kach represented District 10 in Baltimore County along with former governor Robert Ehrlich. Before the 1994 election, District 10 was represented by Kach, Ehrlich, and former gubernatorial candidate Ellen Sauerbrey.

Active in his community, Kach is a member of the Timonium Optimists, the North Baltimore County Republican and Civic Organization, and the Ashland Community Organization. Kach is also a past member Parents Anonymous of Maryland, the Reisterstown-Owings Mills-Glyndon Coordinating Council, and the Reisterstown-Owings Mills-Glyndon Chamber of Commerce.

He has received many honors including an award from the Maryland Society of Accountants in 1999 and the Casper R. Taylor, Jr., Founder's Award, from the House of Delegates in 2006 and, in 2017, the Thomas Kennedy Award for personal courage and dedication.

In elected office for over 50 years, Kach is the longest serving Republican elected official in Maryland history.

In October 2024, Kach announced that he would not run for re-election to the Baltimore County Council in 2026. On May 8, 2026, Kach announced that he would resign from the Baltimore County Council, effective the day prior.

== Election results ==
- 2010 Race for Maryland House of Delegates - District 5B

Voters to choose one:

Name	Votes	Percent	Outcome
Wade Kach, Rep.	13,933	70.8%	Won
Pete Definbaugh, Dem.	4,881	24.8%	Lost
M. Justin Kinsey, Lib.	863	4.4%	Lost
Other Write-Ins	12	0.1%	Lost

- 2006 Race for Maryland House of Delegates – District 5B

Voters to choose one:

Name	Votes	Percent	Outcome
Wade Kach, Rep.	15,321	98.9%	Won
Other Write-Ins	172	1.1%	Lost

- 2002 Race for Maryland House of Delegates – District 5B

Voters to choose one:

Name	Votes	Percent	Outcome
Wade Kach, Rep.	13,122	71.2%	Won
Stephen C. Kirsch, Dem.	5,268	28.6%	Lost
William T. Newton, Ind.	31	0.2%	Lost
Other Write-Ins	17	0.1%	Lost

- 1998 Race for Maryland House of Delegates – District 9A

Voters to choose two:

Name	Votes	Percent	Outcome
Martha Scanlan Klima, Rep.	19,190	40%	Won
Wade Kach, Rep.	18,382	38%	Won
Stephen C. Kirsch, Dem.	10,584	22%	Lost

- 1994 Race for Maryland House of Delegates – District 9A

Voters to choose two:

Name	Votes	Percent	Outcome
Martha Scanlan Klima, Rep.	19,927	38%	Won
Wade Kach, Rep.	18,734	36%	Won
Shelley Buckingham, Dem.	7,829	15%	Lost
Raymond A. Huber, Dem.	5,823	11%	Lost

- 1990 Race for Maryland House of Delegates – District 10

Voters to choose three:

Name	Votes	Percent	Outcome
Ellen Sauerbrey, Rep.	22,649	24%	Won
Bob Ehrlich, Rep.	22,246	24%	Won
Wade Kach, Rep.	21,225	23%	Won
Ellery B. Woodworth, Dem.	11,996	13%	Lost
Walter Boyd, Dem.	8,371	9%	Lost
Robert L. Curtis Jr., Dem.	7,832	8%	Lost
