= Martha Scanlan Klima =

American politician (1938–2025)

Member of the Maryland House of Delegates from the 9A district
- In office January 1983 – January 8, 2003 Serving with Wade Kach
- Preceded by: Thomas L. Bromwell; William J. Burgess; William Rush
- Succeeded by: Robert Flanagan
- Constituency: Baltimore County, Maryland

Personal details
- Born: December 3, 1938 Baltimore, Maryland, U.S.
- Died: October 9, 2025 (aged 86) Timonium, Maryland, U.S.
- Party: Republican

Martha Scanlan Klima (December 3, 1938 – October 9, 2025) was an American politician who was a member of the Maryland House of Delegates. She was first elected in 1982 to represent District 9, which covered a portion of Baltimore County, Maryland, USA. She unsuccessfully ran for the State Senate in 2002. She was defeated by Jim Brochin.

Klima served in the Maryland House of Delegates for 20 years. First elected in 1982 and sworn in in 1983, she served on many committees, including: the Constitutional and Administrative Law Committee from 1983 until 1986, the Appropriations Committee from 1987 until 2003, the oversight committee on personnel from 1993 until 2003, the Joint Budget and Audit Committee from 1991 until 1994, the Special Joint Committee on Pensions from 1993 until 2003 and the Special Joint Committee on Group Homes from 1995 until 1997.

She was the Deputy Minority Whip from 1995 until 2002. She was also a member of the Joint Committee on Administrative, Executive and Legislative Review from 1995 until 2003, the Joint Committee on Welfare Reform from 1996 until 2003 and the Spending Affordability Committee from 1998 until 2003. She was the Vice-President of the Women Legislators of Maryland in 1988. She was a member of the National Conference of State Legislatures. Finally, she was the chair of the Telecommunications and Information Technology Task Force for the American Legislative Exchange Council (ALEC).

== Early life and education ==
Klima was born in Baltimore on December 3, 1938, to Thomas Scanlan, a Bethlehem Steel worker, and his wife Catherine. She was raised in Pikesville, Maryland, and graduated with her associate degree from Villa Julie College in Stevenson, Maryland.

== Career ==
Klima's primary job early in life was a homemaker. However, she was also involved in politics early in life. She was a past secretary of the Central Maryland Health Systems Agency. She was elected as a delegate to the Republican Party National Convention in 1984, which nominated Ronald Reagan and George H. W. Bush.

Additionally, Klima was a member of the Baltimore County Chamber of Commerce, once serving as chair of the membership relations committee. She was a past member and governing trustee of the Council on Economic Education in Maryland. She was a board member for the Center for Prevention of Child Abuse of Maryland, and vice-chair of the Greater Baltimore Medical Center from 1986 until 1991.

From 2003 through 2009, she served on the Maryland Parole Commission.

== Death ==
Klima died on October 9, 2025, in Timonium, Maryland, at the age of 86.

== Awards and recognition ==
Klima won numerous awards and received recognition during her long career, including being appointed an honorary life member of the Maryland Congress of Parents and Teachers. She was once received the Woman of the Year Award from the Towsontowne Business and Professional Women's Club in 1988. Klima was named Outstanding Legislative Member by ALEC in 1994. She also received the Legislative Award from the Baltimore County Commission on Disabilities in 1994. She also received the Public Service Award from the Baltimore Association for Retarded Citizens in 1994 and finally, the Legislator of the Year award from ALEC in 2001.

== Election results ==
- 2002 Race for Maryland State Senate – District 42

Voters to choose two:

Name	Votes	Percent	Outcome
Jim Brochin, Dem.	22,709	51%	Won
Martha S. Klima, Rep.	21,781	48.9%	Lost
Other Write-Ins	45	0.1%	Lost

- 1998 Race for Maryland House of Delegates – District 9A

Voters to choose two:

Name	Votes	Percent	Outcome
Martha S. Klima, Rep.	19,190	40%	Won
A. Wade Kach, Rep.	18,382	38%	Won
Stephen C. Kirsch, Dem.	10,584	22%	Lost

- 1994 Race for Maryland House of Delegates – District 9B

Voters to choose two:

Name	Votes	Percent	Outcome
Martha S. Klima, Rep.	19,927	38%	Won
A. Wade Kach, Rep.	18,734	36%	Won
Shelley Buckingham, Dem.	7,829	15%	Lost
Raymond A. Huber, Dem.	5,823	11%	Lost

- 1990 Race for Maryland House of Delegates – District 9

Voters to choose three:

Name	Votes	Percent	Outcome
Martha S. Klima, Rep.	15,461	19%	Won
Gerry L. Brewster, Dem.	14,876	19%	Won
John J. Bishop, Rep.	14,589	18%	Won
Michael Gisriel, Dem.	14,428	18%	Lost
Charles Culbertson, Dem.	10,522	13%	Lost
James Holechek, Rep.	9,855	12%	Lost

- 1986 Race for Maryland House of Delegates – District 9

Voters to choose three:

Name	Votes	Percent	Outcome
Martha S. Klima, Rep.	16,082	19%	Won
Michael Gisriel, Dem.	14,329	17%	Won
John J. Bishop, Rep.	14,004	17%	Won
Patrick E. Carter, Rep.	13,003	16%	Lost
Jack R. Sturgill Jr., Dem.	12,819	16%	Lost
William R. Richardson Jr., Dem.	12,291	15%	Lost
