= Mary Louise Preis =

American politician (born 1941)

Member of the Maryland House of Delegates from District 34
- In office 1991–1999
- Preceded by: B. Daniel Riley
- Succeeded by: Charles R. Boutin
- Constituency: Harford County

Personal details
- Born: October 10, 1941 (age 84) Jacksonville, Illinois
- Party: Democratic
- Profession: lawyer, politician

Mary Louise Preis (born October 10, 1941) is an American politician who represented district 34 in the Maryland House of Delegates. She was first elected in 1990 and served until 1999.

== Early life and education ==
Delegate Preis was born in Jacksonville, Illinois. Preis graduated from Fontbonne College with her associate degree in 1963 (cum laude). She received her Master of Science degree in 1967 from Georgetown University's Edmund A. Walsh School of Foreign Service. Finally she graduated from the University of Maryland School of Law in 1983 with her J.D. She was admitted to Maryland Bar, in 1983.

== Career ==
While a member of the Maryland House of Delegates Mary Louis Preis was a member of the Judiciary Committee from 1991 until 1997, serving as chair of the gaming, law, & regulation subcommittee. She was also on the Appropriations Committee from 1997 until 1999, the House Facilities Committee from 1993 until 1999. She was House Vice-Chair of the Joint Committee on Administrative, Executive and Legislative Review from 1995 until 1999. Finally, she was a member of the Law and Justice Committee for the National Conference of State Legislatures from 1996 until 1999. She is a former chair of the Harford County Delegation.

Prior to serving in the Maryland General Assembly, Delegate Preis was a practicing attorney. She was also a member of the Board of Trustees at Harford Community College from 1978 until 1988. She also was an Assistant Attorney General from 1985 until 1990, when she first got elected.

Delegate Preis has won several awards in her career including Outstanding Service Award from the Maryland Bar Association in 1995 and the Distinguished Service Award from the Route 40 Business Association in 1998. In 1998, 2000, and 2002, she was named in one of Maryland's Top 100 Women by the Daily Record in their Circle of Excellence.

After serving as a State Delegate, Preis was appointed as Commissioner of the Office of Financial Regulation for the State of Maryland. After she left this position, she worked for Citigroup. Preis has endorsed Hillary Clinton for President.

== Election results ==
- 1994 Race for Maryland House of Delegates – District 34

Voters choose three:

Name	Votes	Percent	Outcome
Nancy Jacobs, Rep.	18,091	20%	Won
Rose Mary Hatem Bonsack, Dem.	17,762	20%	Won
Mary Louise Preis, Dem.	17,380	19%	Won
B. Daniel Riley, Dem.	13,891	15%	Lost
Scott Williams, Rep.	12,362	14%	Lost
Kenneth A. Thompson, Rep.	10,576	12%	Lost

- 1990 Race for Maryland House of Delegates – District 34 - Harford County

Voters to choose three:

Name	Votes	Percent	Outcome
Rose Mary Hatem Bonsack, Dem.	13,373	19%	Won
Mary Louise Preis, Dem.	13,045	19%	Won
David R. Craig, Rep.	12,031	18%	Won
William H. Cox Jr., Dem.	10,296	15%	Lost
David M. Meadows, Rep.	10,069	15%	Lost
Cecil W. Wood, Rep.	9,840	14%	Lost
