= Michael U. Gisriel =

American politician (born 1951)

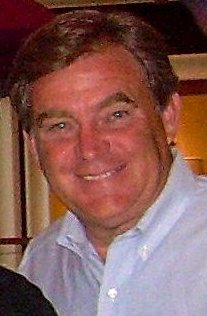

Member of the Maryland House of Delegates from District 9
- In office 1987–1991

Personal details
- Born: March 15, 1951 (age 75) Baltimore, Maryland
- Party: Democratic
- Profession: Former attorney and lobbyist

Michael U. Gisriel (born March 15, 1951) was a member of the Maryland House of Delegates.

== Background ==
Gisriel served a single term in the Maryland House of Delegates before losing in his reelection bid in 1990 to Martha Klima, John Bishop and Gerry Brewster.

== Education ==
Gisriel graduated from Loyola Blakefield High School in Towson, Maryland, then attended the University of Pennsylvania in Philadelphia where he graduated with his Bachelor's degree in 1973. He continued at the University of Maryland School of Law where he received his J.D. in 1976. He was admitted to the Maryland Bar in the same year.

== Career ==
After college Gisriel formed a general civil practice law firm, Gisriel and Gisriel, and served as one of the partners. He later served as counsel to the Majority Leader of the Slate Senate in 1979. From 1980 until 1982 he was a special assistant to the Baltimore County Executive for state legislative affairs. Gisriel was also a member of the Governor's Housing Task Force from 1981 until 1984 and a member of the Democratic State Central Committee from 1982 until 1986. Additionally, he was a member of the Board of Advertising Club of Baltimore and the 9-4-2 Democratic Club. Gisriel received two Resolutions of Achievement from General Assembly.

== Career after politics ==
Gisriel served for a while as a real estate columnist for the Baltimore Sun. From 1993-1999, Gisriel was the host of "All About Real Estate" on WCBM Radio. He continued to practice law with emphasis on government relations (legislative and regulatory), real estate, condominium zoning and real estate financing law. He continues to serve as a lobbyist in Annapolis.

In 2004, an investigation of Gisriel began when, according to the Baltimore Sun, "…Gisriel was mistakenly sent a settlement check intended for his former clients. Gisriel argued that his behavior was unintentional, while the court said his action was dishonest." Gisriel failed to investigate the origins of the check and in 2009 was disbarred as a result of the incident after a ruling from the Maryland Court of Appeals.

== Election results ==
- 1990 Race for Maryland House of Delegates – District 9

Voters to choose three:

Name	Votes	Percent	Outcome
Martha S. Klima, Rep.	15,461	19%	Won
Gerry L. Brewster, Dem.	14,876	19%	Won
John J. Bishop, Rep.	14,589	18%	Won
Michael Gisriel, Dem.	14,428	18%	Lost
Charles Culbertson, Dem.	10,522	13%	Lost
James Holechek, Rep.	9,855	12%	Lost

- 1986 Race for Maryland House of Delegates – District 9

Voters to choose three:

Name	Votes	Percent	Outcome
Martha S. Klima, Rep.	16,082	19%	Won
Michael Gisriel, Dem.	14,329	17%	Won
John J. Bishop, Rep.	14,004	17%	Won
Patrick E. Carter, Rep.	13,003	16%	Lost
Jack R. Sturgill Jr., Dem.	12,819	16%	Lost
William R. Richardson Jr., Dem.	12,291	15%	Lost
