= William H. Cox Jr. =

American politician (born 1942)

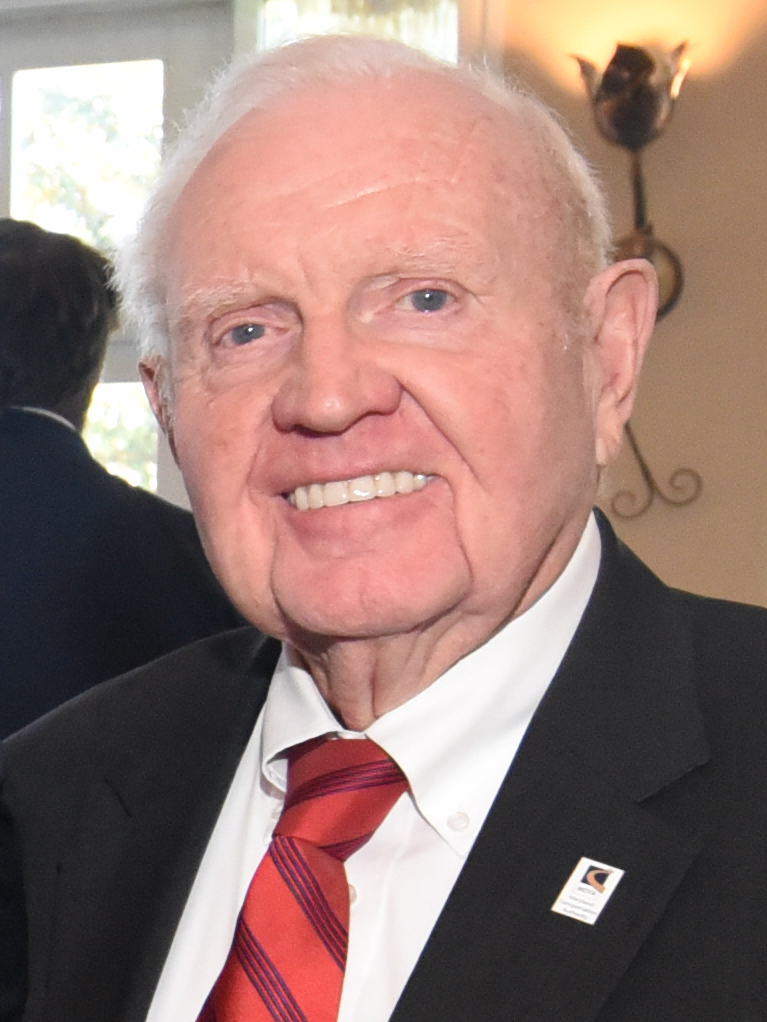
- Cox in 2023

Member of the Maryland House of Delegates from the 34th district
- In office 1983–1990 Serving with Barbara O. Kreamer and Eileen M. Rehrmann

Member of the Maryland House of Delegates from the 6th district
- In office 1975–1982 Serving with George B. Adams Jr. and Catherine I. Riley

Member of the Maryland House of Delegates from the Harford County district
- In office 1971–1974 Serving with William C. Greer, Jon Harlan Livezey, R. Wilson Scarff

Personal details
- Born: July 15, 1942 (age 84) Edgewood, Maryland, U.S.
- Party: Democratic
- Children: 2
- Education: University of Baltimore

William H. Cox Jr. (born July 15, 1942) is an American politician from Maryland. He served in the Maryland House of Delegates from 1971 to 1990.

== Early life ==
William H. Cox Jr. was born on July 15, 1942, in Edgewood, Maryland. He attended Harford County Public Schools and the University of Baltimore.

== Career ==
Cox is a Democrat. Cox served in the Maryland House of Delegates, representing Harford County, from 1971 to 1974. He continued serving from 1975 to 1982, representing District 6. He continued serving from 1983 to 1990, representing District 34. He was a member of the Ways and Means Committee. He served as the deputy majority whip from 1977 to 1983 and the deputy majority floor leader from 1983 to 1990.

Cox is a real estate broker and developer. He is a member of the board of directors of Fallston General Hospital.

== Personal life ==
Cox is married with two children.
