= Maryland Legislative District 34 =

American legislative district

Maryland's legislative district 34
- Represents part of Harford County
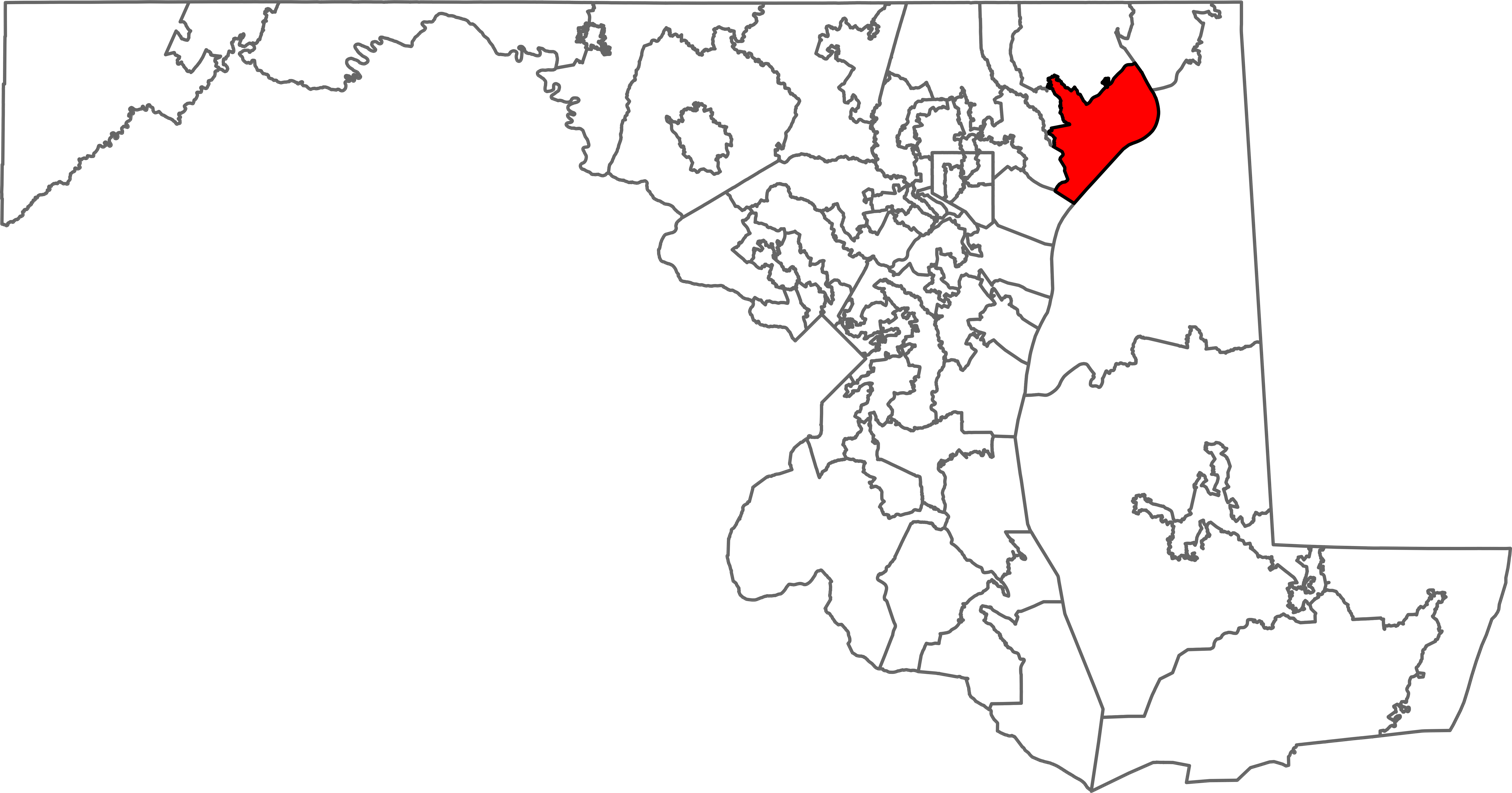
- Senator: Mary-Dulany James (D)
- Delegate(s): Steven C. Johnson (D) (District 34A); Andre Johnson Jr. (D) (District 34A); Susan K. McComas (R) (District 34B)
- Registration: 43.4% Democratic; 33.4% Republican; 21.5% unaffiliated
- Demographics: 61.2% White; 23.9% Black/African American; 0.4% Native American; 3.3% Asian; 0.1% Hawaiian/Pacific Islander; 3.0% Other race; 8.1% Two or more races; 7.1% Hispanic
- Population (2020): 130,756
- Voting-age population: 100,673
- Registered voters: 89,715

Maryland Legislative District 34 is one of 47 districts in the state for the Maryland General Assembly. It covers part of Harford County. The district is divided into two sub-districts for the Maryland House of Delegates: District 34A and District 34B.

== Demographic characteristics ==
As of the 2020 United States census, the district had a population of 130,756, of whom 100,673 (77.0%) were of voting age. The racial makeup of the district was 79,968 (61.2%) White, 31,304 (23.9%) African American, 466 (0.4%) Native American, 4,377 (3.3%) Asian, 72 (0.1%) Pacific Islander, 3,894 (3.0%) from some other race, and 10,605 (8.1%) from two or more races. Hispanic or Latino of any race were 9,281 (7.1%) of the population.

The district had 89,715 registered voters as of October 17, 2020, of whom 19,265 (21.5%) were registered as unaffiliated, 30,008 (33.4%) were registered as Republicans, 38,955 (43.4%) were registered as Democrats, and 822 (0.9%) were registered to other parties.

== Political representation ==
The district is represented for the 2023–2027 legislative term in the State Senate by Mary-Dulany James (D) and in the House of Delegates by Steven C. Johnson (D, District 34A), Andre Johnson Jr. (D, District 34A) and Susan K. McComas (R, District 34B).

== Election history ==
Session	Senate
1986–1989	Catherine Riley (D)
1990–1993	Habern W. Freeman (D)
1994–1997	David R. Craig (R)
1998–2001	Nancy Jacobs (R)
2002–2005	Nancy Jacobs (R)
2006–2009	Nancy Jacobs (R)
2010–2013	Nancy Jacobs (R)
2014–2017	Bob Cassilly (R)
2018–2022	Bob Cassilly (R)
2022–present	Mary-Dulany James (D)

== Election results, 1986-present ==
=== Senate ===
Maryland general election, 2018
Party	Candidate	Votes	%	±%
Republican	Bob Casilly (incumbent)	24,445	50.1	▼7.1
Democratic	Mary-Dulany James	24,256	49.7	▲7.0
Total votes		48,788	100.0	

Maryland general election, 2014
Party	Candidate	Votes	%	±%
Republican	Bob Casilly	22,042	57.2	▲1.3
Democratic	Mary-Dulany James	16,459	42.7	▼1.2
Total votes		38,563	100.0	

Maryland general election, 2010
Party	Candidate	Votes	%	±%
Republican	Nancy Jacobs (incumbent)	22,358	55.9	▼1.4
Democratic	Arthur Henry Helton Jr.	17,540	43.9	▲1.2
Total votes		39,977	100.0	

Maryland general election, 2006
Party	Candidate	Votes	%	±%
Republican	Nancy Jacobs (incumbent)	21,601	57.3	▼3.1
Democratic	William B. Kilby	16,108	42.7	▲3.2
Total votes		37,727	100.0	

Maryland general election, 2002
Party	Candidate	Votes	%	±%
Republican	Nancy Jacobs (incumbent)	20,474	60.4	▲10.4
Democratic	Arthur Henry Helton Jr.	13,399	39.5	▼10.5
Total votes		33,918	100.0	

Maryland general election, 1998
Party	Candidate	Votes	%	±%
Republican	Nancy Jacobs	18,996	50	▼4
Democratic	Mary Louise Preis	18,857	50	▲4
Total votes		37,853	100.0	

|}

Maryland general election, 1994
Party	Candidate	Votes	%	±%
Republican	David R. Craig	17,444	54	▲54
Democratic	Habern W. Freeman (incumbent)	14,676	46	▼54
Total votes		32,120	100.0	

Maryland general election, 1990
Party	Candidate	Votes	%	±%
Democratic	Habern W. Freeman	19,050	100	▲20
Total votes		19,050	100.0	

Maryland general election, 1986
Party	Candidate	Votes	%
Democratic	Catherine Riley (incumbent)	17,473	80
Republican	Francis J. Eurice	4,374	20
Total votes		21,847	100.0
