= Eileen M. Rehrmann =

American politician

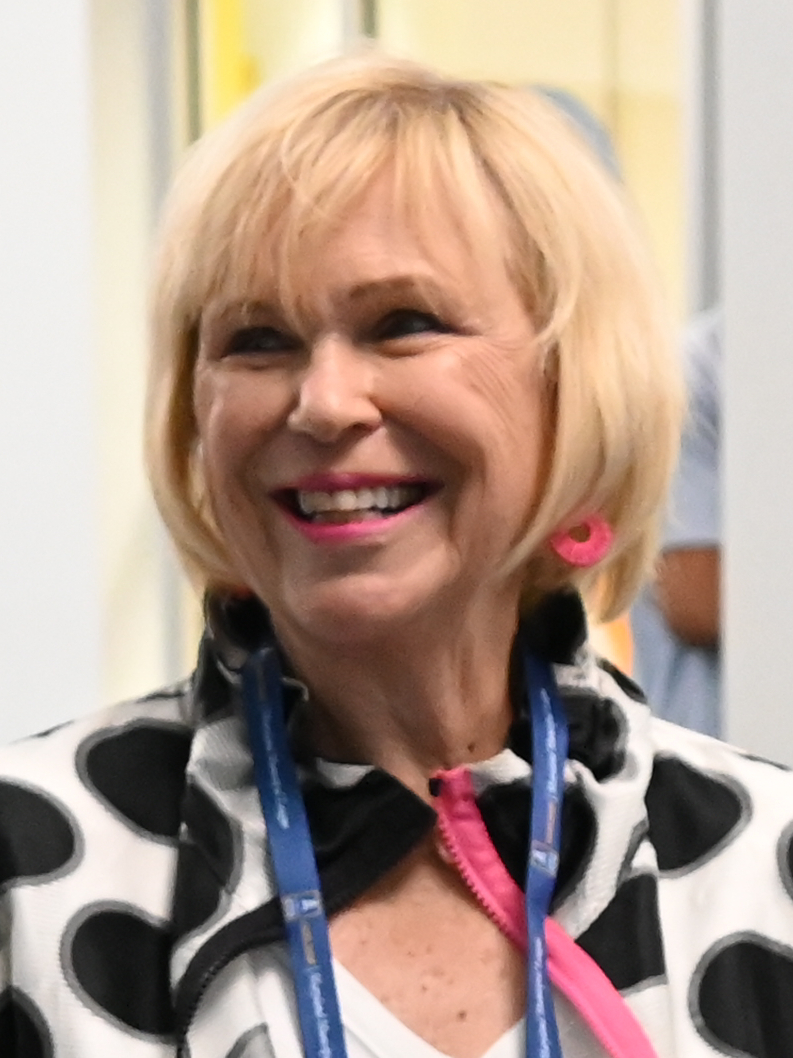
- Rehrmann in 2026

4th Executive of Harford County
- In office 1990–1998
- Preceded by: Habern W. Freeman
- Succeeded by: James Harkins

Member Maryland House of Delegates, District 34
- In office 1983–1990

Personal details
- Born: November 30, 1944 (age 81) Chester, Pennsylvania, U.S.
- Party: Democratic
- Education: Immaculata College; University of Maryland

Eileen M. Rehrmann (born November 30, 1944) is a Democratic politician from the State of Maryland, having served Harford County in several different elected positions.

== Education ==
Rehrmann attended Immaculata College in Philadelphia. She received her bachelor's degree in 1997 from the University of Maryland in business and government.

== Early life ==
Rehrmann was an educator early in life before turning to politics.

== Political career ==
Rehrmann served on the town commission in Bel Air, Maryland from 1978 until 1982. She was elected to the Maryland House of Delegates serving District 34 from 1983 until 1990. During her time in the House of Delegates she served on the Appropriations Committee, in addition to being a member of the Joint Committee on the Management of Public Funds from 1984 until 1990. Furthermore, from 1987 until 1990 she served on the Joint Committee on Federal Relations, the Joint Committee on Ports, and the Private Sector Port Committee. She was the chair of the Harford County Delegation from 1985 until 1990 and also served as the chair of the Women Legislators of Maryland.

In 1990 Rehrmann was elected as Harford County Executive, defeating Republican challenger Geoffrey R. Close, becoming Harford County's first female county executive. She served as county executive from 1990 until 1998.

In 1994, Rehrmann was reelected, this time defeating Republican Ronald M. Szczybor, capturing 62% of the vote.

In 1998, Rehrmann made a run for Governor of Maryland, but eventually dropped out of the race, which was eventually won by Parris Glendening, which was his second term.

Rehrmann earned many awards over her career, including the Leadership Award from Maryland League of Women Voters in 1979, being named an Honorary Citizen of the City of Aberdeen in 1980, the distinguished Service Award from the Maryland Municipal League in 1982, and the Certificate of Distinguished Citizenship, also in 1982. In 1995 she was named the Public Official of the Year by the Mental Health Association of Metropolitan Baltimore, then in 1996 she received the William Fell Public Service Award, 1996. Rehrmann was named among Maryland's Top 100 Women according to the Daily Record in 1997, 1999, and in 2013.
