= Kevin Galvin =

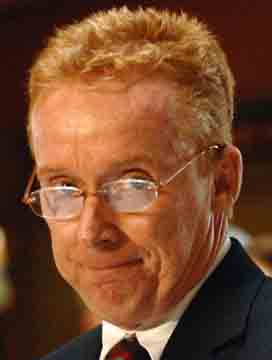
- Born: August 22, 1953 (age 73); West Hartford, Connecticut

Kevin Galvin (born August 22, 1953) is a Connecticut-based business activist. He is the founding chair of the Small Business for Health Care Reform advisory committee and is best known for his efforts as an advocate for the interests of small business in the reform of health care systems. Galvin participated in the national health care reform debate that culminated in the passage and signing of the Patient Protection and Affordable Care Act in March 2010. He and his coalition also played a role in the passage of Connecticut's SustiNet health care reform plan in 2009.

== Biography ==
Galvin was born and raised in West Hartford, Connecticut. He attended Conard High School and now resides in Farmington, Connecticut. He has been a small business owner since 1972. He spent 15 years promoting professional motor sports in the continental United States, Hawaii, Canada and the West Indies as part of his business, New England Pro Racing. Later, he managed, then purchased, a hardware store and founded a handyman business in West Hartford. Galvin is now owner of the West Hartford-based Connecticut Commercial Maintenance, Inc., a commercial and residential facilities maintenance company. He is a past president of the West Hartford Chamber of Commerce. Galvin and his wife have two children.

== Advocate ==
Galvin was a leader in organizing West Hartford community members in support of smart growth and long-term economic development in the 1990s.

In February 2009 Galvin collaborated with other small business owners to organize a coalition of thousands of small companies known as the Small Businesses for Health Care Reform. The coalition endorsed the SustiNet plan, a bill in the Connecticut General Assembly developed by Universal Health Care Foundation of Connecticut and aimed at achieving universal health care in Connecticut by opening up the existing state employee insurance pool. Galvin testified before the Connecticut General Assembly on multiple occasions in support of SustiNet, which became law in July 2009.

In August 2009 Galvin hosted Secretary of Health and Human Services Kathleen Sebelius, Small Business Administration Administrator Karen Mills, Senator Chris Dodd and Representative Rosa DeLauro at his Connecticut Commercial Maintenance shop facility for a discussion of health care reform and business.

In October 2009, Galvin was invited to the White House with a group of small business owners from across the nation to share his ideas about what small business need in order to grow and strengthen the economy and communities.

The following month, Galvin served on a panel with Secretary of the Treasury Timothy Geithner at the Small Business Financing Forum, a gathering of policymakers, lenders, and business owners called by President Barack Obama to explore ideas and strategies for expanding access to financing for small businesses.

In the course of the national health care reform debate, Senator Dodd made two presentations on the floor of the United States Senate based on Galvin's story. At the White House Health Care Summit on February 25, 2010, Dodd said, “He [Galvin] decided he wanted to provide health care. And, like the stories you've all heard, he lost a fellow of 24 years because the guy had a health care issue… But Kevin did more than just tell me a story about himself, Mr. President, and what happened to his seven employees because he couldn't get health care. He went out in my state of Connecticut and organized small businesses. And they changed the law in Connecticut… Because here was a small business guy who wanted to take care of his people… ”

Galvin served on a state advisory committee for the implementation of the SustiNet plan He and his advocacy work have been featured in the Hartford Courant, the Hartford Business Journal, the New Haven Register and the Los Angeles Times, among other publications, as well as on MSNBC.

In June 2009 Galvin was honored by the Connecticut General Assembly for his "Commitment to improving health care... on behalf of thousands of entrepreneurs and families across Connecticut who struggle with health care costs, access and quality."

== See also ==
- Chris Dodd
- Connecticut
- Health care reform in the United States
- SustiNet
- Universal Health Care Foundation of Connecticut
- West Hartford, Connecticut
