= Valeria Culotta =

American molecular biologist

- Born: Maryland, USA

Academic background
- Education: PhD, Biological Chemistry, 1987, Johns Hopkins University
- Thesis: The transcriptionally active state of eukaryotic ribosomal RNA genes (1987)

Academic work
- Institutions: Johns Hopkins Bloomberg School of Public Health

Valeria Cizewski Culotta is an American molecular biologist.

== Early life and education ==
Culotta was born and raised in Maryland, where she graduated from Havre De Grace High School in 1975. She then completed her PhD in 1987 at Johns Hopkins University and her postdoctoral training in molecular biology at the National Cancer Institute.

== Career ==
Following her postdoctoral training, Culotta joined the faculty of Environmental Health Sciences at Johns Hopkins Bloomberg School of Public Health in 1990. While serving in this role, she received a MERIT award from the National Institutes of Health to support her research. Culotta eventually joined the Department of Biochemistry and Molecular Biology where she found that copper chaperones have evolved to ferry copper ions to specific copper-containing proteins. As such, her discovery was implicated in certain motor neuron disorders and diseases of copper metabolism such as Wilson's and Menkes diseases. In 2011, Culotta was elected a Fellow of the American Association for the Advancement of Science for her studies on the role of metals in biology.

Beyond studying copper chaperones, Culotta began to study the role of manganese and iron in the cellular workings of the Lyme bacterium, Borrelia burgdorferi. In 2015, Culotta and her research team discovered that levels of copper in the bloodstream increase during infection in an attempt to kill the pathogen with copper poisoning. As such, organs such as the kidneys send their copper into the bloodstream, causing their levels to drop. The following year, she became the Bloomberg School's first Director of Postdoctoral Training and earned the 2018 inaugural Dean's Award for Distinction in Faculty Mentoring.

In 2020, Culotta was appointed the inaugural Associate Vice Provost for Postdoctoral Affairs to "advance policies and priorities for postdocs across all of the Johns Hopkins divisions and labs." In this role, her research team discovered a new type of copper-dependent enzyme in pathogenic fungi.
