= Andre Johnson Jr. =

American politician (born 1971)

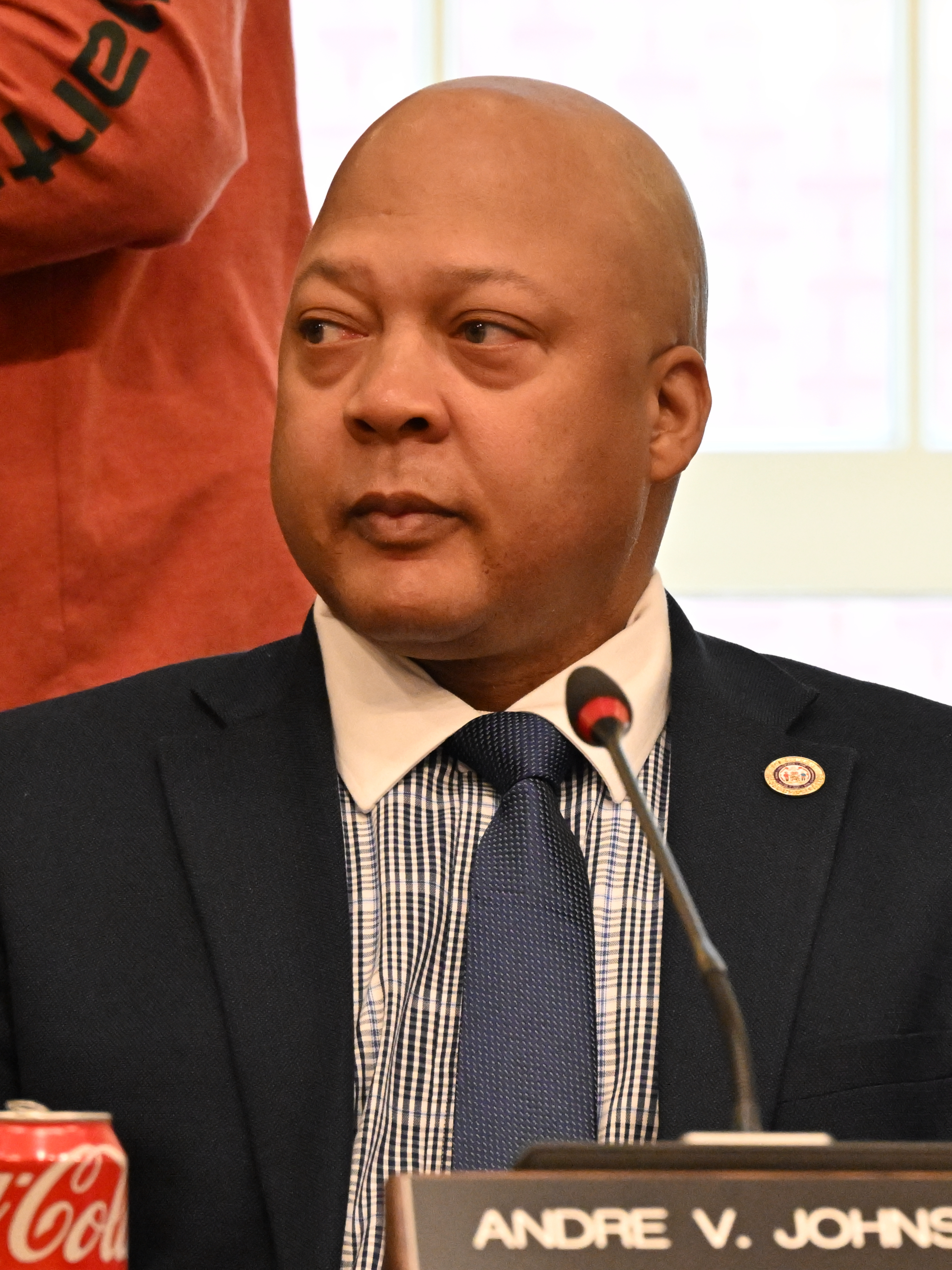
- Johnson in 2023

Member of the Maryland House of Delegates from the 34A district
- Incumbent
- Assumed office January 11, 2023 Serving with Steven C. Johnson (Note: Not related to Steven C. Johnson)
- Preceded by: Mary Ann Lisanti

Member of the Harford County Council, District A
- In office December 4, 2018 – December 6, 2022
- Preceded by: Mike Perrone, Jr.
- Succeeded by: Dion Guthrie

Personal details
- Born: June 19, 1971 (age 55) Aberdeen Proving Ground, Maryland, U.S.
- Party: Democratic
- Children: 5
- Education: Edgewood High School
- Website: Campaign website

Military service
- Branch/service: United States Army
- Years of service: 1998–2015
- Rank: Staff Sergeant

Andre V. Johnson Jr. (born June 19, 1971) is an American politician. He is a member of the Maryland House of Delegates for District 34A in Harford County. He previously represented District A in the Harford County Council from 2018 to 2022.

== Background ==
Johnson was born at Aberdeen Proving Ground in Edgewood, Maryland, and attended Edgewood High School, graduating in 1990. After graduating, he served in the United States Army as an armored crewman, and was deployed in Iraq. He retired from the Army in 2015 as a staff sergeant. Johnson later worked as an investigator for the Baltimore Department of Housing and Community Development, and as a police officer for the Baltimore Police Department from 1997 to 1999.

In 2018 Johnson ran for the Harford County Council in District A, seeking to succeed retiring county councilmember Mike Perrone. He won the Democratic primary over former county councilmember Dion Guthrie by a margin of 199 votes out of 2,633 votes cast. He won the general election on November 6, 2018, defeating Republican challenger Donna Blasdell and becoming the first Edgewood resident elected to the county council.

== Harford County Council ==
Johnson was sworn in to the Harford County Council on December 4, 2018.

In February 2019, after it was reported that state delegate Mary Ann Lisanti had described a district in Prince George's County as a "n----- district" in a conversation with another legislator, Johnson said he wanted to hear Lisanti explain in her own words what transpired. After speaking to Lisanti, he called on her to resign.

In June 2021 Johnson announced that he would run for the Maryland House of Delegates in District 34A. He won the Democratic primary on July 19, 2022, and ran on a "Johnson & Johnson" ticket with incumbent Democratic state delegate Steven C. Johnson in the general election. He won the general election on November 8, 2022, coming in first with 29.59 percent of the vote.

== In the legislature ==
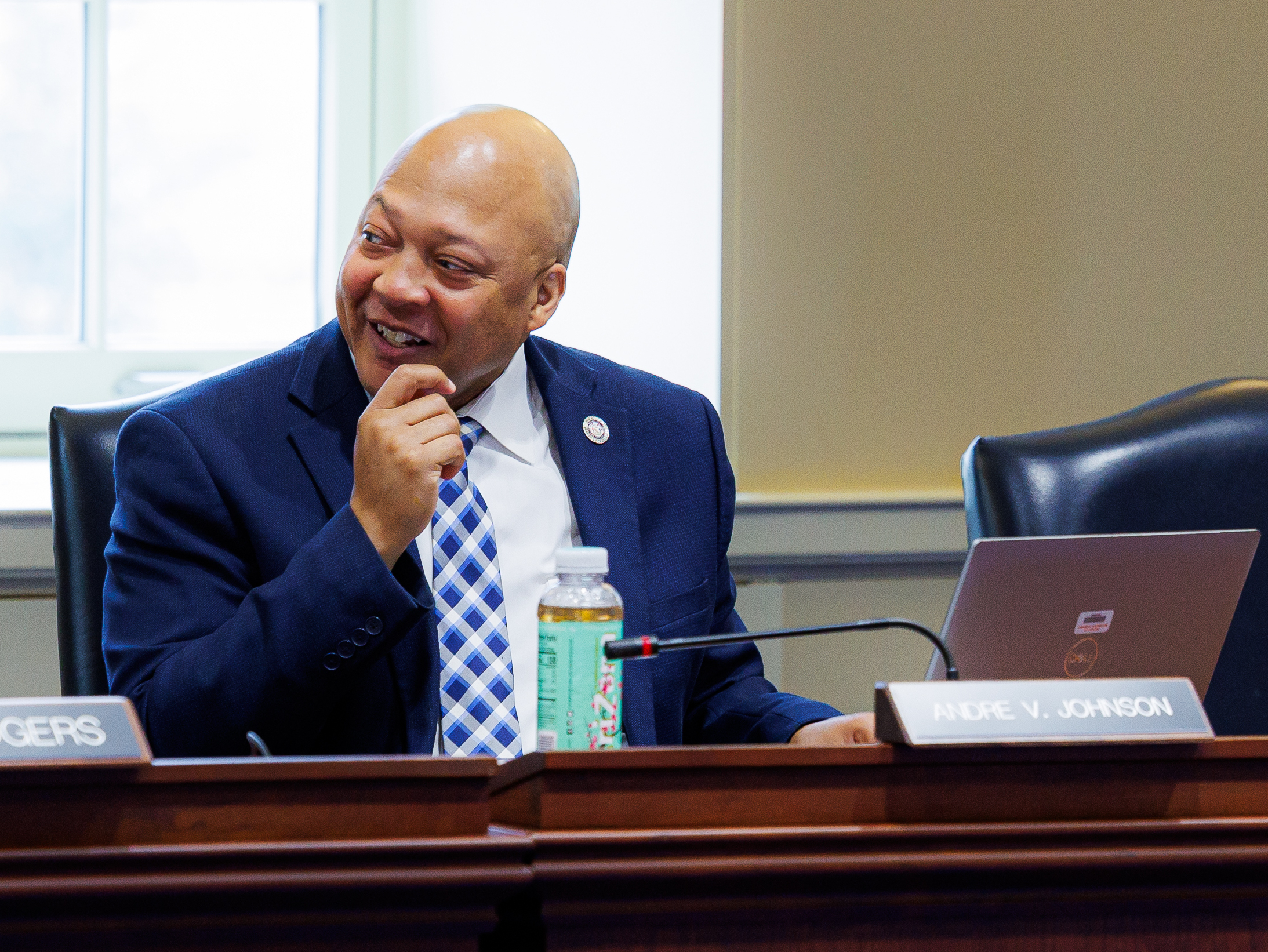
Johnson in the House Economic Matters Committee, 2025

Johnson was sworn into the Maryland House of Delegates on January 11, 2023. He is the first African American to represent Harford County in the Maryland General Assembly. Johnson is a member of the House Economic Matters Committee.

== Political positions ==
=== Crime ===
In October 2019, following what police called a "targeted shooting" in Edgewood, Johnson called for increased community engagement and working closely with law enforcement to combat gang violence.

=== Development initiatives ===
In April 2019 Johnson voted against a resolution to expand the Edgewood/Joppa Enterprise Zone to include land meant for a proposed Abingdon Business Park warehouse project, saying that while he supported the enterprise zone's expansion, he had concerns over the expansion's support for the proposed warehouse. In July 2019, he attended a protest against the warehouse's construction.

In February 2022 Johnson said he supported imposing a moratorium to block the proposed construction of a 5.2 million square foot "mega warehouse" on the Perryman Peninsula. In April 2022, Johnson voted for a bill that would place a building development moratorium on the Perryman Peninsula.

=== National politics ===
In January 2021 Johnson called on U.S. Representative Andy Harris to resign following his opposition to certifying the results of the 2020 presidential election. Harris responded to Johnson a few days later, calling Johnson's calls a "petty political machination" and attacking Johnson for failing to curb drug use and crime in his district. Johnson maintained that it was not a partisan issue and that Harris' response was dismissive of his point.

=== Redistricting ===
In December 2021 Johnson voted against the Harford County Council's redistricting plan, which passed on a party-line vote of 6–1. The redistricting map was vetoed by county executive Barry Glassman on December 28, but the county council voted to override the veto on January 4, 2022, with Johnson again voting against the redistricting plan.

== Personal life ==
Johnson is married and has five children.

== Electoral history ==
Harford County Council District A Democratic primary election, 2018
Party	Candidate	Votes	%
Democratic	Andre V. Johnson	1,416	53.8
Democratic	Dion F. Guthrie	1,217	46.2

Harford County Council District A election, 2018
Party	Candidate	Votes	%
Democratic	Andre V. Johnson	8,156	56.2
Republican	Donna Blasdell	6,339	43.7
Write-in		16	0.1

Maryland House of Delegates District 34A Democratic primary election, 2022
Party	Candidate	Votes	%
Democratic	Andre V. Johnson, Jr.	4,619	42.8
Democratic	Steven C. Johnson (incumbent)	3,486	32.3
Democratic	Sarahia Benn	2,682	24.9

Maryland House of Delegates District 34A election, 2022
Party	Candidate	Votes	%
Democratic	Andre V. Johnson, Jr.	13,478	29.59
Democratic	Steven C. Johnson (incumbent)	12,029	26.41
Republican	Glen Glass	10,717	23.53
Republican	Teresa Walter	9,248	20.31
Write-in		72	0.16
