= Steven C. Johnson (Maryland politician) =

American politician (born 1960)

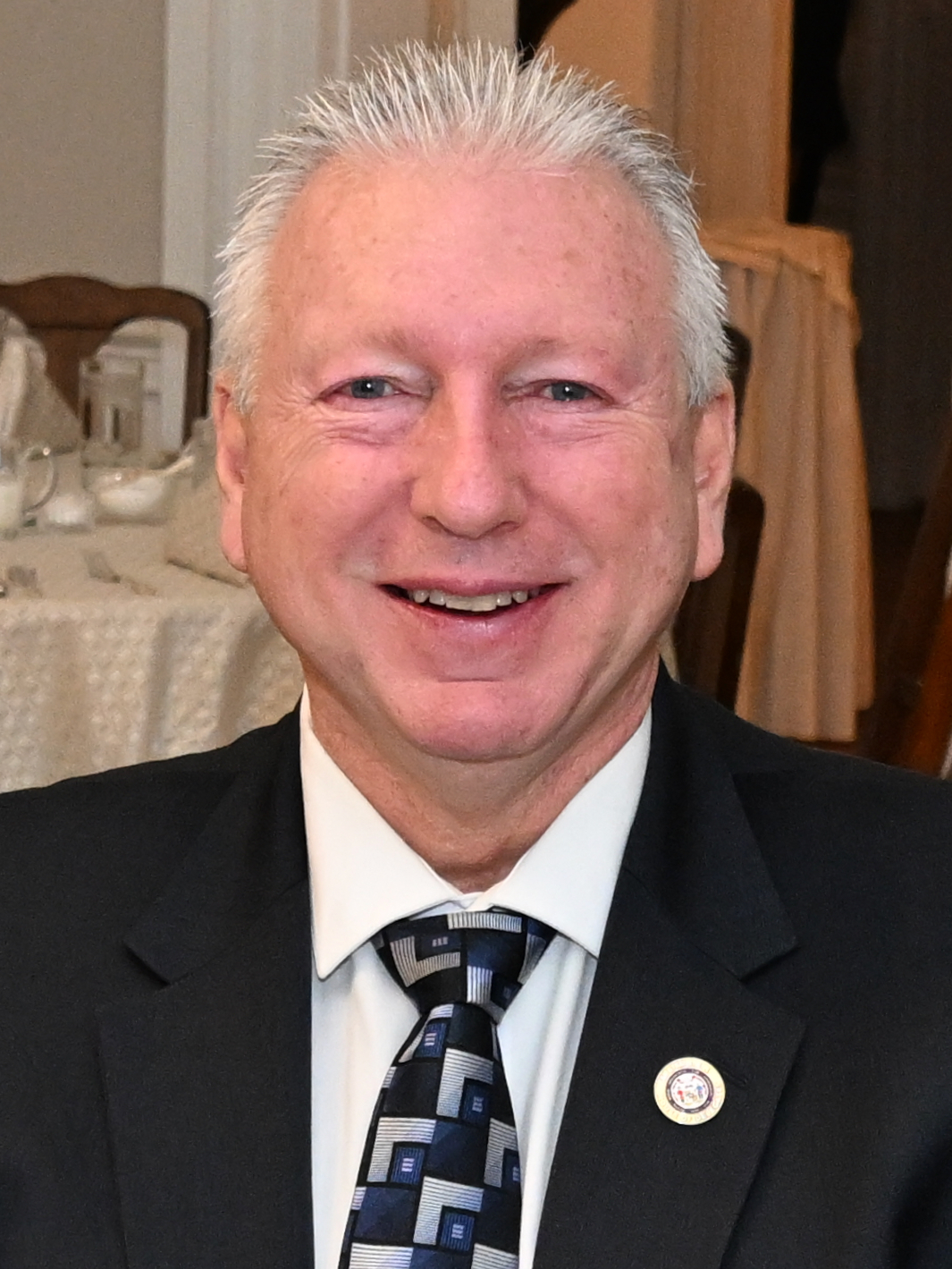
- Johnson in 2025

Member of the Maryland House of Delegates from the 34A district
- Incumbent
- Assumed office January 9, 2019 Serving with Andre Johnson Jr. (Note: Not related to Andre Johnson Jr.)
- Preceded by: Glen Glass

Personal details
- Born: December 30, 1960 (age 65) Garrison, Kentucky, U.S.
- Party: Democratic
- Children: 3
- Education: Shady Spring High School; Raleigh County Vocational Technical Center
- Website: Official website

Military service
- Branch/service: Army National Guard
- Years of service: 1977–1987

Steven C. Johnson (born December 30, 1960) is an American politician who is a Democratic member of the Maryland House of Delegates representing District 34A.

== Early life and education ==
Johnson was born on December 30, 1960, in Garrison, Kentucky. He attended Shady Spring High School and Raleigh County Vocational Technical Center. Johnson served in the Army National Guard from 1977 to 1987, and as an auxiliary police officer in Aberdeen from 2006 to 2016. He also worked as a construction supervisor at Locust Point Shipyard and owns the Johnson Family Pharmacy in Aberdeen.

From 2005 to 2017, Johnson worked as the director of Economic Development for the city of Aberdeen, Maryland. He ran for the Aberdeen City Council in 2007, but he was disqualified shortly before the general election for not living within the city limits. Johnson initially challenged his disqualification, but dropped his legal challenge, saying that he didn't "want to alter the natural outcome of the election". In 2014, he unsuccessfully ran for the Maryland House of Delegates in District 34A.

== In the legislature ==
Johnson won election to the Maryland House of Delegates in 2018, edging out incumbent state delegate Glen Glass by a margin of 165 votes. He was sworn in on January 9, 2019, and has served as a member of the Health and Government Operations Committee during his entire tenure. Since 2023, Johnson has served as deputy majority whip.

== Political positions ==
=== Education ===
In February 2021, during debate on a bill to stagger the terms of elected Harford County school board members, Johnson supported an amendment to create a fully-elected school board in the county. The amendment failed in a 4–4 tie.

=== Gun policy ===
During the 2020 legislative session, Johnson voted against legislation requiring background checks for sales of shotguns and rifles.

=== Health care ===
During the 2020 legislative session, Johnson introduced the "Connor's Courage" Act, named for Havre de Grace High School student Connor Sheffield, which would allow students to take medical marijuana at school. The bill passed and became law.

=== Minimum wage ===
During the 2019 legislative session, Johnson voted for legislation to raise the state minimum wage to $15 an hour.

=== Social issues ===
During the 2020 legislative session, Johnson introduced legislation that would protect lemonade stands from being shut down by local permit laws.

=== Taxes ===
During the 2022 legislative session, Johnson opposed an amendment to legislation to enact a 30-day gas tax holiday amid the Russo-Ukrainian War that would've extended the holiday to 90 days. He also introduced legislation that would exempt oral hygiene products from the state sales tax, which passed and was signed into law by Governor Larry Hogan.

== Personal life ==
Johnson is married with three children.

== Electoral history ==
Maryland House of Delegates District 34A Democratic primary election, 2014
Party	Candidate	Votes	%
Democratic	Mary Ann Lisanti	2,473	29.0
Democratic	Marla Posey-Moss	1,895	22.2
Democratic	Pat Murray	1,784	20.9
Democratic	Steve Johnson	1,574	18.4
Democratic	Maria Terry	812	9.5

Maryland House of Delegates District 34A Democratic primary election, 2018
Party	Candidate	Votes	%
Democratic	Mary Ann Lisanti (incumbent)	3,794	46.8
Democratic	Steve Johnson	2,190	27.0
Democratic	Sarahia Benn	2,123	26.2

Maryland House of Delegates District 34A election, 2018
Party	Candidate	Votes	%
Democratic	Mary Ann Lisanti (incumbent)	13,558	28.5
Democratic	Steve Johnson	11,857	24.9
Republican	Glen Glass (incumbent)	11,692	24.6
Republican	J.D. Russell	9,606	20.2
Write-in		825	1.8

Maryland House of Delegates District 34A election, 2022
Party	Candidate	Votes	%
Democratic	Andre Johnson Jr.	13,478	29.6
Democratic	Steven C. Johnson (incumbent)	12,029	26.4
Republican	Glen Glass	10,717	23.5
Republican	Teresa Walter	9,248	20.3
Write-in		72	0.2
