= Charles Boutin =

American attorney and politician (1942–2021)

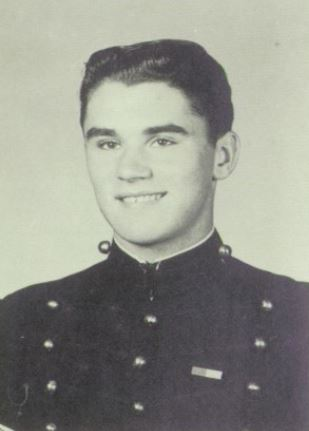

Member of the Maryland House of Delegates from the 34A district
- In office January 13, 1999 – June 30, 2005 Serving with Mary-Dulany James (1999–2005); B. Daniel Riley (1999–2003)
- Succeeded by: Sheryl Davis Kohl

Mayor of Aberdeen, Maryland
- In office 1994–1998
- Preceded by: Ruth Elliott
- Succeeded by: Douglas S. Wilson

Personal details
- Born: March 7, 1942 Troy, New York, U.S.
- Died: May 23, 2021 (aged 79) Rock Hall, Maryland, U.S.
- Party: Democratic; Republican
- Spouse: Cynthia Ann Shepherd (m. 1976)
- Children: 3
- Education: Siena College (BS); University of Baltimore (JD)

Charles R. Boutin (March 7, 1942 – May 23, 2021) was an American attorney and politician who served in the Maryland House of Delegates from the 34A and 36th districts from 1999 to 2005, as a member of the Republican Party. Before his tenure in the state legislature, he was active in local politics in Aberdeen, Maryland.

Boutin was born in Troy, New York, and educated at Christian Brothers Academy, Siena College with a Bachelor of Science in economics, and the University of Baltimore School of Law with a juris doctor. He was admitted to the Maryland Bar. He entered politics when he was appointed to the Harford County, Maryland Board of Education and served as the board's president before unsuccessfully running for county executive.

Boutin returned to politics in the 1990s when he was elected to the Aberdeen, Maryland city council and elected as the city's mayor. Afterwards he was elected to the Maryland House of Delegates which he served in until his appointment to the Maryland Public Service Commission. He served on the commission until his resignation after a sex scandal. He served in the Maryland Office of Administrative Hearings as a judge. He died from drowning in 2021.

== Early life and education ==
Charles R. Boutin was born in Troy, New York, on March 7, 1942, to Charles R. Boutin Sr. He graduated from the Christian Brothers Academy in 1959, graduated from Siena College with a Bachelor of Science in economics in 1963, and graduated from the University of Baltimore School of Law with a juris doctor in 1970. Boutin was admitted to the Maryland Bar in 1972. He married Cynthia Ann Shepherd, with whom he had three children, in 1976.

== Career ==
=== Local politics ===
In 1977, Boutin was included as one of four people recommended by the Harford County Permanent Nominating Caucus, which had delegates from thirty-nine organizations, to fill one of two vacancies on the Harford County Board of Education and was one of three peopled endorsed by state Senator Arthur H. Helton Jr. for the position. Acting Governor Blair Lee III appointed Boutin and John Tillery Jr. to replace Thomas Snodgrass and George R. Litchfield on the board. Boutin served on the board of education from 1977 to 1981, and as president of the board from 1979 to 1981. He was succeeded as president by Tillery and Sue Ellen Johnson replaced him on the board of education after he resigned on December 31, 1981, to run for county executive.

In 1981, Boutin announced that he would run for the Democratic nomination for county executive of Harford County which was then held by J. Thomas Barranger. He placed fourth in the Democratic primary won by Habern W. Freeman.

He ran for a seat on the city council in Aberdeen, Maryland, in 1990, but lost to Evlynn Becker, Ruth Elliott, and George Englesson. Boutin served on the city council from 1992 to 1994. Boutin was elected mayor of Aberdeen in the 1994 election, defeating incumbent Ruth Elliott.

=== Maryland House of Delegates ===
Boutin and Michael D. Griffin won the Republican nomination to run for one of the seats in the Maryland House of Delegates from District 34A in 1998. He won in the general election alongside Democratic nominees Mary-Dulany James and B. Daniel Riley. He won reelection in 2002, alongside James while Riley lost reelection. He resigned from the state legislature to take a position on the Maryland Public Service Commission and Governor Bob Ehrlich replaced him with Sheryl Davis Kohl.

During his tenure in the House of Delegates he served on the Health and Government Operations, and Environmental Matters committees. He was a member of the Rural, Taxpayers Protection, Maryland Legislative Sportsmen's, and Veterans caucuses. From 2003 to 2005, he served as chief deputy Minority Whip.

== Later life ==
Boutin began his term on the Maryland Public Service Commission on July 1, 2005, but resigned from the commission on March 7, 2007, after a convicted prostitute stated that she had spent over one hour with Boutin. Boutin admitted using his state computer account to send e-mails to the prostitute but denied meeting with her. Governor Martin O'Malley appointed Lawrence Brenner to replace Boutin on the commission.

Chief Administrative Law Judge Thomas E. Dewberry selected Boutin to work as an administrative law judge at the Maryland Office of Administrative Hearings which he started on April 4, 2007, and worked as until 2012.

Boutin died after drowning in Rock Hall, Maryland, on May 23, 2021.

== Political positions ==
Boutin proposed legislation while serving in the Maryland House of Delegates which would make observing animal fights a misdemeanor charge with a punishment of ninety days in jail and a $1,000 fine. It would also make the transportation and breeding of dogs for fighting a felony punishable by three years in prison and a $5,000 fine. Those who arranged fights would be punished with a felony conviction punishable by three years in prison and a $5,000 fine. He proposed an amendment to the Constitution of Maryland which would define marriage as only between a man and a woman.

== Electoral history ==
1982 Harford County Executive Democratic primary
Party	Candidate	Votes	%
Democratic	Habern W. Freeman	6,687	31.49%
Democratic	J. Thomas Barranger	6,581	30.99%
Democratic	William O. Carr	2,795	13.16%
Democratic	Charles Boutin	2,011	9.47%
Democratic	Donald W. Androsky	2,010	9.46%
Democratic	John A. Kennedy	897	4.22%
Democratic	Frank W. Soltis	257	1.21%
Total votes		21,238	100.00%

1990 Aberdeen, Maryland city council election
Party	Candidate	Votes	%
Nonpartisan	George Englesson (incumbent)	790	25.99%
Nonpartisan	Ruth Elliott (incumbent)	754	24.80%
Nonpartisan	Evlynn Becker (incumbent)	697	22.93%
Nonpartisan	Charles Boutin	630	20.72%
Nonpartisan	John Bailiff	169	5.56%
Total votes		3,040	100.00%

1994 Aberdeen, Maryland mayoral election
Party	Candidate	Votes	%
Nonpartisan	Charles Boutin	1,164	60.50%
Nonpartisan	Ruth Elliott (incumbent)	760	39.50%
Total votes		1,924	100.00%

1998 Maryland House of Delegates 34A district election
Primary election
Party	Candidate	Votes	%
Republican	Charles Boutin	2,924	26.85%
Republican	Michael D. Griffin	2,262	20.77%
Republican	Sheryl Davis Kohl	2,253	20.69%
Republican	Charles E. King	1,911	17.55%
Republican	William G. Christoforo	1,541	14.15%
Total votes		10,891	100.00%
General election
Democratic	Mary-Dulany James	18,357	21.70%
Republican	Charles Boutin	17,844	21.10%
Democratic	B. Daniel Riley	17,798	21.04%
Democratic	Robin Walter	15,370	18.17%
Republican	Michael D. Griffin	15,207	17.98%
Total votes		84,576	100.00%

2002 Maryland House of Delegates 34A district election
Primary election
Party	Candidate	Votes	%
Republican	Charles Boutin	3,078	100.00%
Total votes		3,078	100.00%
General election
Republican	Charles Boutin (incumbent)	11,182	34.85%
Democratic	Mary-Dulany James (incumbent)	10,947	34.12%
Democratic	B. Daniel Riley (incumbent)	9,957	31.03%
Total votes		32,086	100.00%
