= Mary-Dulany James =

American politician (born 1960)

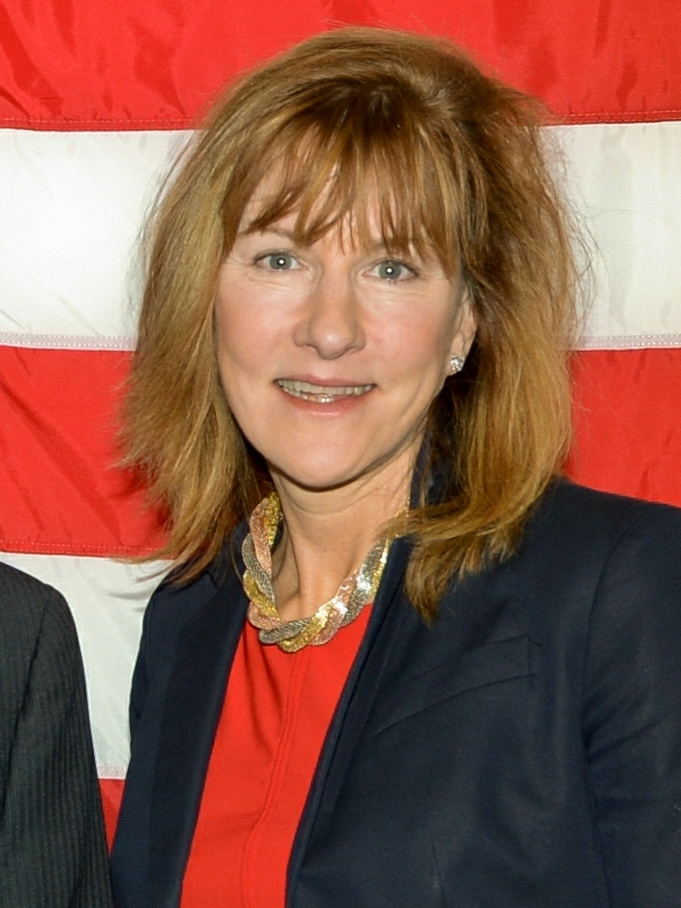
- James in 2014

Member of the Maryland Senate from the 34th district
- Incumbent
- Assumed office January 11, 2023
- Preceded by: Christian Miele

Member of the Maryland House of Delegates from the 34A district
- In office January 13, 1999 – January 13, 2015 Serving with B. Daniel Riley (1999–2003, 2007–2011), Charles Boutin (1999–2005), and Glen Glass (2011–2015)
- Preceded by: Mary Louise Preis
- Succeeded by: Mary Ann Lisanti

Personal details
- Born: February 1, 1960 (age 66) Baltimore, Maryland, U.S.
- Party: Democratic
- Spouse: Brian Bruce Feeney (m. 1989, divorced)
- Children: 3
- Parent: William S. James (father)
- Education: University of Maryland, College Park (BS); University of Maryland School of Law (JD)
- Occupation: Attorney
- Website: Campaign website

Mary-Dulany James (born February 1, 1960) is an American politician who has represented District 34 in the Maryland Senate since 2023. She was a member of the District 34A in the Maryland House of Delegates for sixteen years, representing Harford and Cecil Counties along the U.S. Route 40 corridor. James represented district 34A, formerly district 34, for 16 years having first been elected in 1998.

In 2014 and 2018, James unsuccessfully ran for the Maryland Senate in District 34. In 2022, she launched her third bid for the state senate seat, this time defeating Deputy Secretary of the Maryland Department of Disabilities and former state delegate Christian Miele in the general election.

== Early life and education ==
James was born in Baltimore, Maryland, to father William S. James, then a state senator for Harford County, and mother Margaret James, a homemaker. She grew up and still lives on her family's farm in Harford County, and attended Havre De Grace High School and the University of Maryland, College Park where she earned a B.S. in psychology with honors in 1981. James attended the University of Maryland School of Law, earning a Juris Doctor degree with honors in 1986. While studying for the bar exam, she clerked for Judge Edward Skottowe Northrop in the U.S. District Court for the District of Maryland. She was admitted to Maryland Bar in 1986. She worked for law firms in Baltimore, then set up her own practice in Harford County where she lived.

== Political career ==
=== Maryland House of Delegates ===
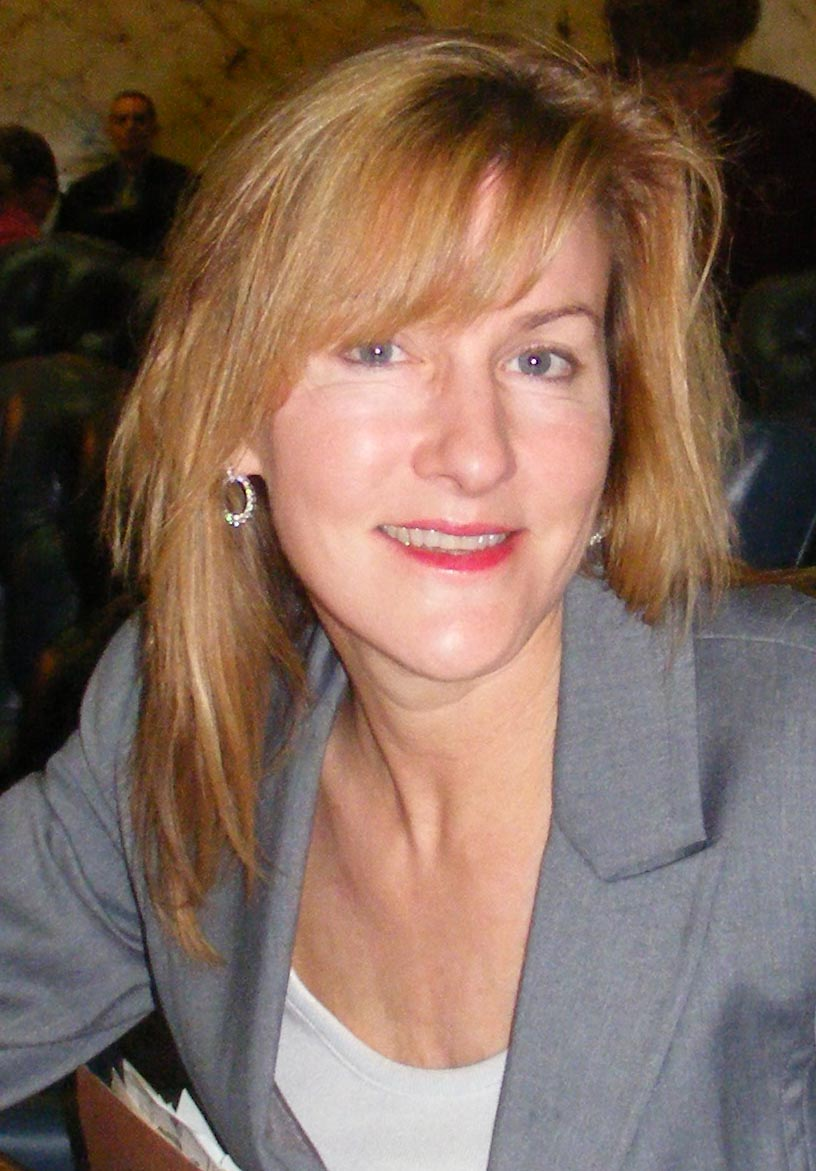
James on the House floor in 2008

James ran for the Maryland House of Delegates in 1998, seeking to replace one of two outgoing state delegates in District 34 (Mary Louise Preis and Nancy Jacobs, both of whom ran for state senate). She won the Democratic primary with 22 percent of the vote, and later won the general election on November 3, 1998, with 18 percent of the vote. James was re-elected to the newly redistricted District 34A (Harford and Cecil counties) in 2002, and was subsequently re-elected in 2006, and 2010.

James was a member of the Appropriations Committee during her entire tenure, including as the chair of the oversight committee on pensions and the vice chair of the transportation and the environment subcommittee from 2003 to 2006. She was also a member of the Harford County Delegation, the Maryland Green Caucus, the Maryland Rural Caucus, the Maryland Bicycle and Pedestrian Caucus, the Maryland Veterans Caucus, and the Women Legislators of Maryland.

=== Maryland Senate ===
==== Elections ====
2014

In June 2013, James said that she was considering a run for the Maryland Senate in District 34, after state senator Nancy Jacobs said she would not run for re-election in 2014. At the time, James was the only Democratic member of the Harford County delegation. James filed to run for the state senate seat in November 2013, and faced former state senator Art Helton in the Democratic primary, who she defeated in the June 2014 primary election by a 2-to-1 margin. She faced Republican challenger Bob Cassilly in the general election, and sought to position herself as an independent Democrat, noting her votes against gas- and sales-tax increases. James was defeated by Cassilly in the general election on November 3, 2014, receiving 42.7 percent of the vote to Cassilly's 57.2 percent.

2018

In 2018, James filed to run for the Maryland Senate in District 34, seeking a rematch between her and incumbent state senator Bob Cassilly. She faced former state delegate Barbara Osborn Kreamer in the Democratic primary election, which she won by a 3-to-1 margin. James lost to Cassilly in a tight general election on November 6, 2018, receiving 49.7 percent of the vote to Cassilly's 50.1 percent, or by a 189-vote margin out of 48,788 votes cast.

2022

In January 2022, James launched her third bid for the Maryland Senate in District 34, seeking to succeed state senator Bob Cassilly, who ran for Harford County executive in 2022. She defeated state delegate Mary Ann Lisanti in the Democratic primary election on July 19, 2022, by a 2-to-1 margin, and faced Republican challenger Christian Miele in the general election.

In the general election, James received financial support from President of the Maryland Senate Bill Ferguson and the Senate Democratic Caucus. She also accused her opponent, Republican Christian Miele, of being a carpetbagger, noting that he previously represented Baltimore County in the Maryland House of Delegates before moving to Harford County. James defeated Miele in a tight general election on November 8, receiving 50.55 percent of the vote to Miele's 49.24 percent, or by a margin of 591 votes out of 45,223 votes cast. She is the first Democrat to represent District 34 in the Maryland Senate since 1994. It was the closest race in the 2022 Maryland Senate election.

==== Tenure ====
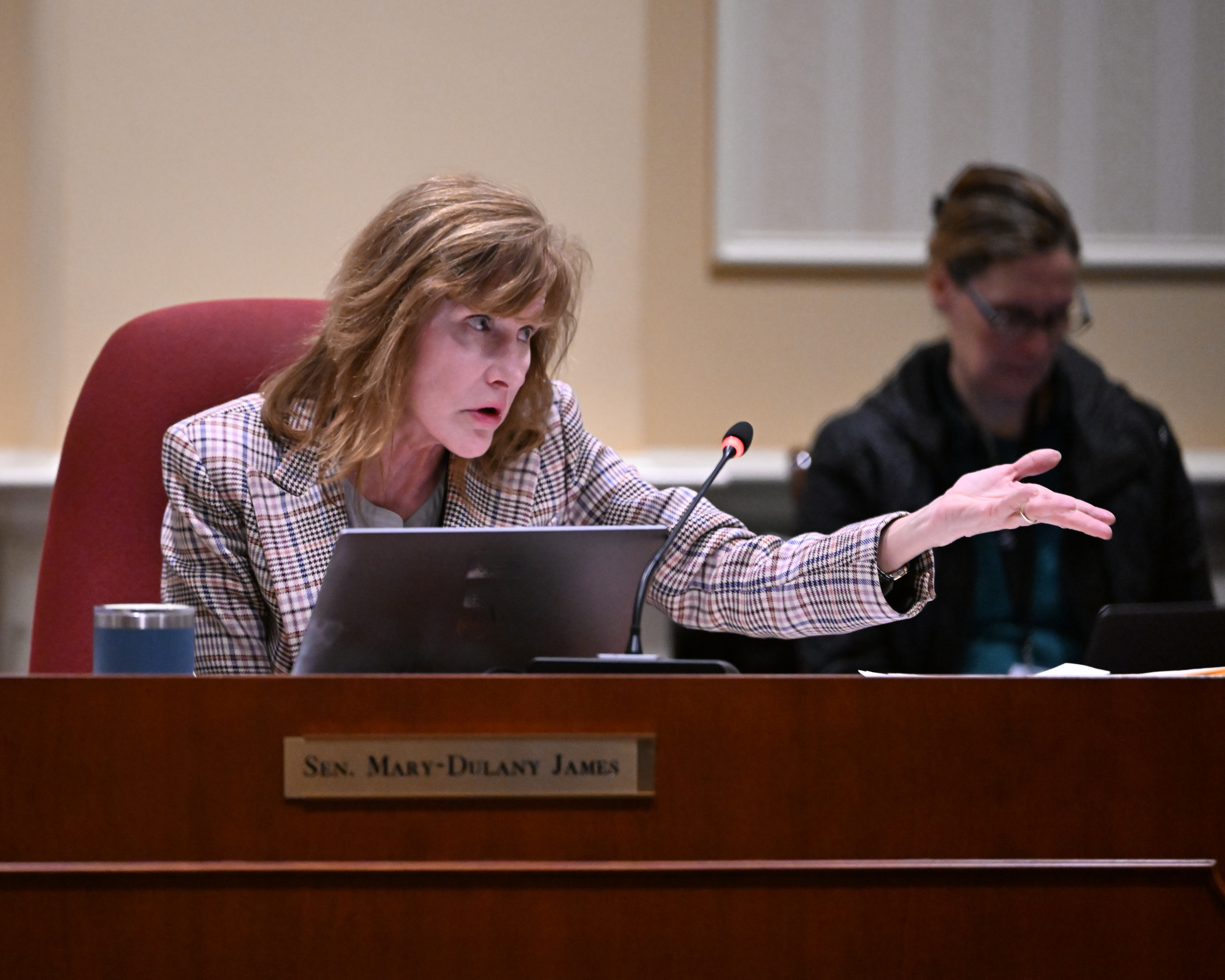
James in the Judicial Proceedings Committee, 2024

James was sworn into the Maryland Senate on January 11, 2023. She is a member of the Judicial Proceedings Committee and the Executive Nominations Committee.

== Political positions ==
While in the Maryland House of Delegates, James was considered a moderate to conservative Democrat. In January 2012, she formed a Blue Dog caucus in the state legislature along with other centrist Democratic members of the Maryland House of Delegates.

=== Electoral reform ===
In November 2025, James said she would consider a bill to redraw Maryland's congressional districts in response to Republican mid-decade redistricting efforts in various red states, but added that her vote would depend on the maps being proposed and that she considered mid-decade redistricting overall to be risky. She supports drawing her legislative district into a congressional district that included Western Shore counties around Baltimore instead of including it in a district including counties on the Eastern Shore of Maryland. In February 2026, James said she opposed holding a vote on a bill that would redraw Maryland's congressional districts to improve the Democratic Party's chances of winning the 1st congressional district, the only congressional district held by Republicans in the state.

In February 2026, James was one of two Democratic state senators to vote against a bill that would ban minority voter suppression and dilution in local and county elections.

=== Energy ===
In February 2013, James voted for a bill that would allow a surcharge of up to $2 a month on residential natural gas bills to pay for new pipelines and distribution system upgrades. The bill passed the Maryland House of Delegates by a vote of 119–18, and later passed the state senate by a vote of 34–13.

=== Gun control ===
During the 2013 legislative session, James was one of 18 Democratic state delegates to vote against the Firearm Safety Act of 2013, a bill that placed restrictions on firearm purchases and magazine capacity in semi-automatic rifles.

=== Healthcare ===
In April 2014, James expressed concerns regarding the state's overhaul of its health exchange to adopt technology from Connecticut's health exchange program, saying that there were "huge budgetary implications" in switching to the Connecticut model.

=== Immigration ===
In January 2026, during debate on a bill to ban counties from entering into 287(g) program agreements with U.S. Immigration and Customs Enforcement (ICE), James introduced an amendment that would have allowed counties to continue participating in the program, but would have prohibited certain immigration enforcement activities by local police unless an individual has been charged or convicted of a felony. The amendment was rejected in a 4–7 vote, after which she voted to approve the bill in committee. She also supported a floor amendment to the bill by state senator Steve Hershey that would have allowed county leaders to decide whether to enter into or terminate a 287(g) agreement, which was rejected in a 14–32 vote. In April 2026, James was one of two Democratic state senators to vote against the Community Trust Act, which would require ICE to present a judicial warrant to hold someone and only allows for someone to be detained for ICE in a state or local correctional facility if the person was convicted of a felony, is a registered sex offender, served between 12 and 18 months in a state prison, or committed an offense in another state and served at least five years in prison.

=== Policing ===
During the 2026 legislative session, James was the only Democrat to vote against a bill to ban law enforcement officers from wearing face coverings, expressing concerns that the bill could elevate tensions between local law enforcement enforcing the ban and federal officials.

=== Social issues ===
In 2005, James was one of 36 Democratic state delegates to vote for a bill that would legalize slot machines at four locations in the state. The bill passed the House of Delegates by a 71–66 vote.

In 2006, James voted for a bill that would create a ballot referendum to legalize same-sex marriage in Maryland. The bill failed to pass out of the Maryland House of Delegates on a 61–78 vote. In 2012, she voted against the Civil Marriage Protection Act, which legalized same-sex marriage in Maryland.

=== Taxes ===
In April 2004, James was one of two Democratic state delegates to switch their no votes to yes to revive a $1 billion tax plan proposed by Speaker of the Maryland House of Delegates Michael E. Busch, after House Appropriations Committee Chairman Norman Conway persuaded her to change her vote. She later defended her vote change, saying that she "thought it deserved a full hearing on the House floor".

In November 2007, James voted for a bill that raised corporate and income taxes, and voted against another bill that increased the state sales tax, car tilting tax, and hotel tax.

In May 2012, James was one of 18 Democratic state delegates to vote against a bill that raised $300 million in tax hikes.

In March 2013, James was one of 22 Democratic state delegates to vote against a bill that would raise the state's gas tax and index future increases to inflation to replenish the state's transportation fund.

=== Unions ===
In March 2010, James said she opposed a bill that would give collective bargaining rights to librarians, saying that she thought it was inappropriate "for the state to be telling the local governments how to conduct themselves".

== Personal life ==
James married Brian Bruce Feeney on September 23, 1989. They had three children and later divorced. They lived together in Havre de Grace, Maryland.

On September 30, 2018, James' daughter, Evelyn Ann James Feeney, suddenly died. This led to James stopping all campaign activities leading up to the general election.

== Electoral history ==
Maryland House of Delegates District 34 Democratic primary election, 1998
Party	Candidate	Votes	%
Democratic	Mary-Dulany James	4,775	22
Democratic	B. Daniel Riley	4,165	19
Democratic	Robin Walter	3,223	15
Democratic	Joseph H. Brooks	3,082	14
Democratic	Joseph H. Brooks	3,082	14
Democratic	Nicholas J. Paros	2,979	14
Democratic	Judith Boardman Redding	2,198	10
Democratic	Dion F. Guthrie	1,638	7

Maryland House of Delegates District 34 election, 1998
Party	Candidate	Votes	%
Democratic	Mary-Dulany James	18,357	18
Republican	Charles Boutin	17,844	18
Democratic	B. Daniel Riley	17,798	18
Republican	Robert E. Shaffner	16,236	16
Democratic	Robin Walter	15,370	15
Republican	Michael Griffin	15,207	15

Maryland House of Delegates District 34A election, 2002
Party	Candidate	Votes	%
Republican	Charles Boutin (incumbent)	11,182	34.79
Democratic	Mary-Dulany James (incumbent)	10,947	34.06
Democratic	B. Daniel Riley (incumbent)	9,957	30.98
Write-in		59	0.18

Maryland House of Delegates District 34A election, 2006
Party	Candidate	Votes	%
Democratic	Mary-Dulany James (incumbent)	12,903	31.7
Democratic	B. Daniel Riley	11,121	27.3
Republican	Glen Glass	8,554	21.0
Republican	Sheryl Davis Kohl (incumbent)	8,085	19.9
Write-in		22	0.1

Maryland House of Delegates District 34A election, 2006
Party	Candidate	Votes	%
Democratic	Mary-Dulany James (incumbent)	12,639	29.2
Republican	Glen Glass	10,931	25.3
Republican	Patrick McGrady	9,889	22.9
Democratic	Marla Posey-Moss	9,745	22.5
Write-in		51	0.1

Maryland Senate District 34 Democratic primary election, 2014
Party	Candidate	Votes	%
Democratic	Mary-Dulany James	4,705	61.1
Democratic	Arthur Henry Helton, Jr.	2,997	38.9

Maryland Senate District 34 election, 2014
Party	Candidate	Votes	%
Republican	Bob Cassilly	22,042	57.2
Democratic	Mary-Dulany James	16,459	42.7
Write-in		62	0.2

Maryland Senate District 34 Democratic primary election, 2018
Party	Candidate	Votes	%
Democratic	Mary-Dulany James	5,812	74.1
Democratic	Barbara Osborn Kreamer	2,027	25.9

Maryland Senate District 34 election, 2018
Party	Candidate	Votes	%
Republican	Bob Cassilly (incumbent)	24,445	50.1
Democratic	Mary-Dulany James	24,256	49.7
Write-in		87	0.2

Maryland Senate District 34 Democratic primary election, 2022
Party	Candidate	Votes	%
Democratic	Mary-Dulany James	6,598	65.6
Democratic	Mary Ann Lisanti	3,453	34.4

Maryland Senate District 34 election, 2022
Party	Candidate	Votes	%
Democratic	Mary-Dulany James	22,858	50.55
Republican	Christian Miele	22,267	49.24
Write-in		98	0.22
