= OAH (disambiguation) =

OAH often refers to the Organization of American Historians, a professional society for American historians.

OAH or Oah can also refer to:

- Maryland Office of Administrative Hearings, part of the state government of Maryland, U.S.
- Oah, a 2010 song by Alexander Rybak
- Shindand Air Base, an air base near Shindand, Afghanistan
