= Access Health CT =

Health insurance marketplace for the U.S. state of Connecticut

Agency overview
- Jurisdiction: Health insurance marketplace for U.S. state of Connecticut
- Website: www.accesshealthct.com

Access Health CT is the health insurance marketplace for the U.S. state of Connecticut. Access Health CT will enable people and small businesses to purchase health insurance at federally subsidized rates.

== Background ==
Health insurance exchanges were established as a part of the 2010 Patient Protection and Affordable Care Act to enable individuals to purchase health insurance in state-run marketplaces. In this legislation, states could choose to establish their own health insurance exchanges; if they choose not to do so, the federal government would run one for the state.

== See also ==
- SustiNet (Connecticut)
- Universal Health Care Foundation of Connecticut
- List of hospitals in Connecticut
