= Steve Konopka =

American football player (born 1976)

Steve Konopka (born May 12, 1976) is a former tight end/defensive tackle in the Arena Football League.

== High school years ==
Konopka attended Conard High School in West Hartford, Connecticut, where he was a two-time All-State selection. He recorded 25 sacks and 189 tackles in 28 games in his career, including 12 sacks and 63 tackles as a senior. Konopka was offered a scholarship to UConn, but it was withdrawn due to academic reasons.

== College career ==
Konopka played college football at Central Connecticut State University, where he was a three-time All-Northeast Conference (NEC) selection. As a senior, he was named the NEC Defensive Player of the Year after recording a conference-leading 12 sacks, despite missing three games. He also broke the school record for sacks in a game, recording five in a win over Saint Francis. In another win over St. John's, he tallied four sacks, an interception, and a blocked field goal. However, an ankle injury prevented him from playing in any senior all-star games.

== Professional career ==
Konopka was projected to be a third- or fourth-round draft pick. After going undrafted in the 1999 NFL draft, he signed a three-year deal with the New York Giants, a team he had worked out with multiple times. However, Konopka was cut that August after sustaining a hamstring injury.

Konopka was invited to join the New England Sea Wolves of the Arena Football League in 2000 during the second week of their training camp, transitioning to the fullback position. He recorded one sack, one pass deflection, and one reception in the final preseason game against the Carolina Cobras and earned a spot on the final 30-man roster. However, Konopka suffered an injury in the preseason which he aggravated in the season opener, forcing him to miss nine games after undergoing rotator cuff surgery.

Konopka later played with the Las Vegas Gladiators from 2003 to 2006.

On October 3, 2006, he signed with the Utah Blaze.
