= Sedgwick Middle School =

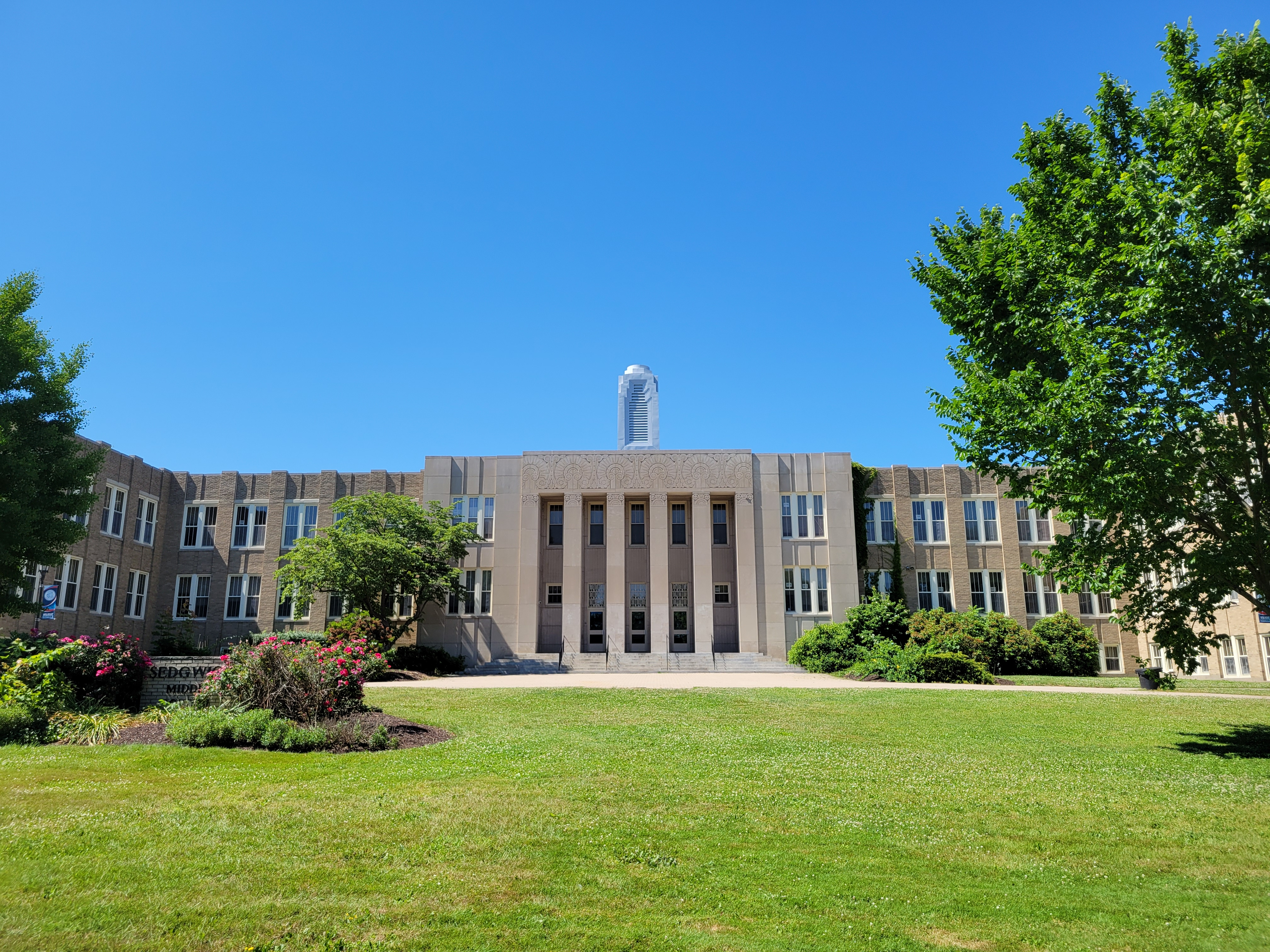
- Sedgwick Middle School

Location
- 128 Sedgwick Road; West Hartford, Connecticut 06107; United States; 41.7523°N 72.7548°W

Information
- Type: Public Middle School
- Opened: 1931
- School district: West Hartford Public Schools
- Principal: Karen Kukish
- Grades: 6-8
- Enrollment: 874
- Mascot: Wildcats
- Website: www.sedgwick.whps.org

Sedgwick Middle School is public middle school, located in the town of West Hartford, Connecticut, and is part of West Hartford Public Schools.

== History ==
Feeder schools for Sedgwick include Braeburn, Duffy, Charter Oak, Webster Hill and Wolcott.

Sedgwick was a Blue Ribbon School in 1999–2000.
