= King Philip Middle School =

Public school in West Hartford, Connecticut

Coordinates: 41.7926°N 72.7429°W

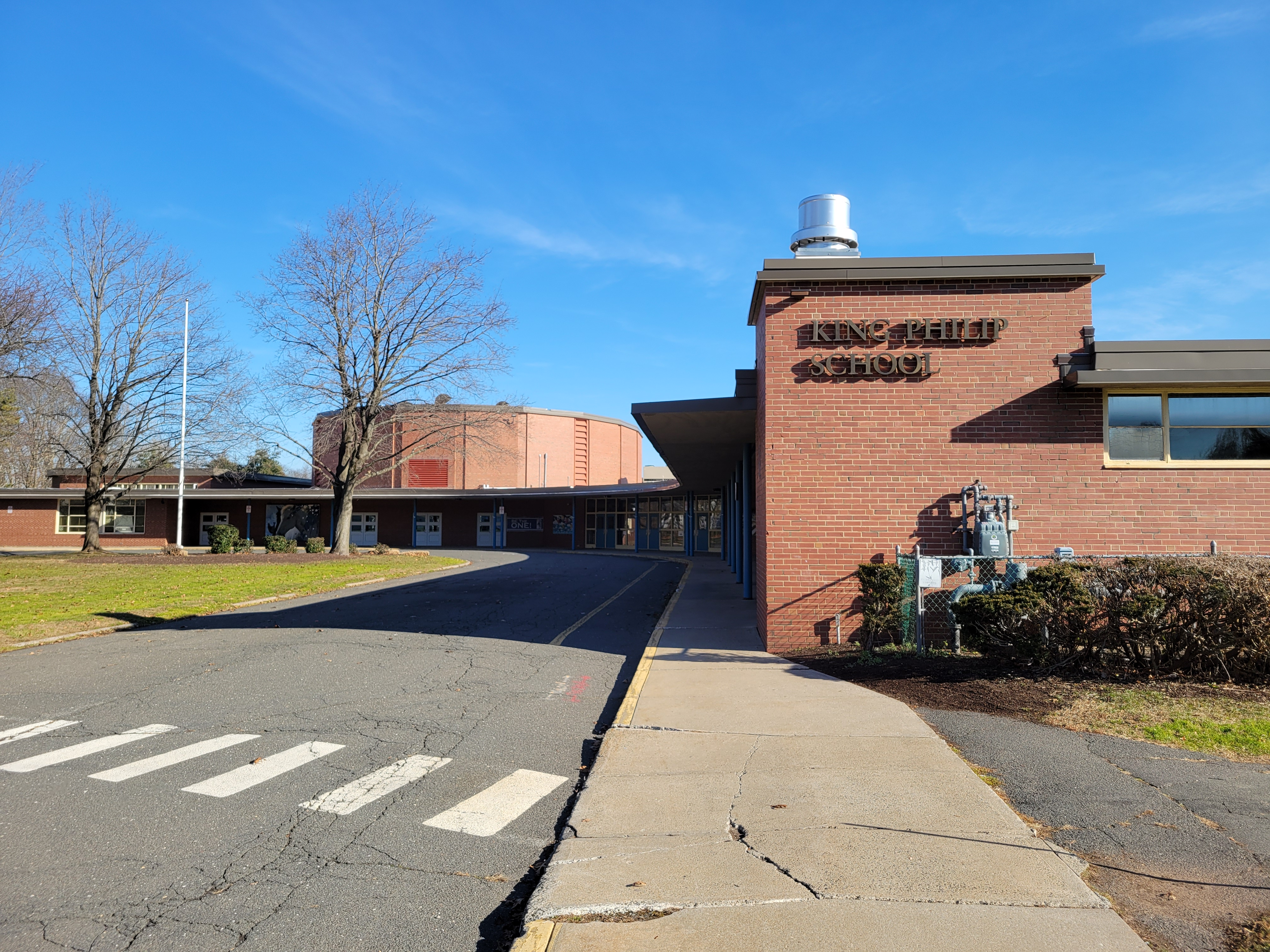
- King Philip Middle School
- 100 King Philip Drive; West Hartford, Connecticut 06117; United States

Information
- School type: Public Middle School
- Opened: 1955
- School district: West Hartford Public Schools
- Principal: Joy Wright
- Assistant Principals: Justin Gusy & Sonya Stemmer
- Grades: 6-8
- Enrollment: 985 (2016–17)
- Colors: Blue & White
- Sports: Yes
- Mascot: Mustang
- Website: Official Site

King Philip Middle School is a middle school in the town of West Hartford, Connecticut. It is one of the West Hartford Public Schools as well as one of three public middle schools in the town of West Hartford.

King Philip Middle School is beginning to move some homework and study related activities online by using Google Classroom along with related Google products, and by using PowerSchool, an online portal for grades and attendance.

== Academics ==
Each grade is split into three teams, each having a team leader, five standard academic teachers, and a Special Education teacher. All of the students throughout the school share 4 counselors, one for each grade, in addition to one "Student Support Counselor." There is also a grade wide Unified Arts team, which consists of teachers for "Art", "Health", "Music", "Physical Education", and "Technology & Engineering." Each team is named after a gemstone: sixth grade is Diamond, Topaz, and Ruby. Seventh is Opal, Sapphire, and Garnet. Eighth is Emerald and Amethyst.

== History ==
The school was named after King Philip, a war chief of the Wampanoag Indians and their leader in King Philip's War.

The building was completed in 1955, and cost $3,446,540.44. It is on 42 acres (170,000 m^{2}), and the building is 186,000 sq ft (17,300 m^{2}). It has a capacity of 700 for elementary students and 830 for middle school but is presently only used for middle school students.

King Philip opened in September 1955, with 345 students, and a teaching staff of 17. The school day was made up of 7 periods.

During the 1961-1962 school year, French and Spanish were offered as electives two periods per week. During the fifth period of the day, the entire school studied or elected a music activity. Clubs and athletic activities were carried out before and after school. Some 7th and 9th grade students were offered accelerated programs. Now, world language is considered an academic, so it is taught every day for students taking it.

For the 1962-1963 year, a flexible form of individualized scheduling was introduced, and block scheduling was eliminated. Also, a reading consultant was provided for 3 days a week for additional help.

King Philip Middle School was a Blue Ribbon School in 1986–87.

In 2016, Mandarin Chinese was added as a world language opportunity for the middle school.

In the 2026-27 academic year, King Philip Middle School self-reported "approximately 930 students and more than 130 faculty and staff members."
