= Edward W. Morley School =

Primary school in Connecticut, United States

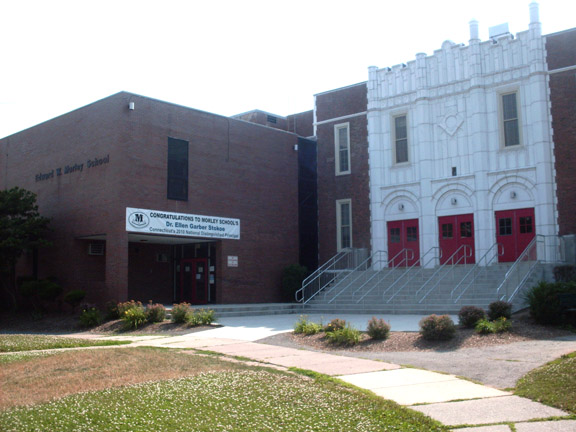

Location
- 77 Bretton Road; West Hartford, Connecticut 06119; United States; 41.7690°N 072.7323°W

Information
- School type: Elementary School
- Motto: "Character Builds Community."
- School district: West Hartford Public Schools
- Principal: Ryan Cleary
- Grades: K-5
- Enrollment: 301 (2015–16)
- Colors: Blue and White
- Mascot: Mustang horse
- Website: Official School Website

Edward W. Morley School is an elementary school in the West Hartford Public School District. The school is named after Edward W. Morley, a professor of chemistry at Case Western Reserve University who was famous for the Michelson–Morley experiment (effort to detect aether that came up empty).

== Recognitions ==
Dr. Ellen Stokoe, former principal of Morley Elementary School, was named 2010 National Distinguished Principal by the Connecticut Association of Schools (CAS). The CAS program recognizes an outstanding principal in each state who has made a difference and brought about positive change in their school. These principals must demonstrate leadership and organizational skills that have reached beyond their buildings and instill in others a sense of purpose. Under Dr. Stokoe, Morley was the first elementary school in the district to introduce and implement professional learning communities and individual student improvement plans.

== Special Activities ==
Following the 2010 Haiti earthquake, students at the Morley school took up a collection in honor of Dr. Anton Alerte, the husband of fifth grade teacher Heather Alerte, who did part of his residency in Haiti. The funds raised were sent to Doctors Without Borders for use in Haiti.

Every year Morley school holds a "Backpack Brigade." Teachers and students collect school supplies for needy families and deliver them, packed inside backpacks that will also be donated, to West Hartford's town hall for distribution.

Morley school also holds an annual "Red Wagon Food Drive" to benefit the West Hartford Food Pantry. Students in kindergarten, first and second grades pull wagons containing donated food items from the school to town hall.

The Morley school holds a special annual celebration to mark the Chinese New Year, a 15-day celebration that emphasizes family and reunion.

== MEDC ==
Morley Extended Day Care Inc. (MEDC) is an extracurricular program for students attending the Morley school. The summer and vacation camps are open to any elementary school students in the West Hartford Public School District as well as students from other towns.
