= Maryland House of Delegates District 34A =

American legislative district

Maryland's legislative district 34A
- Represents part of Harford County
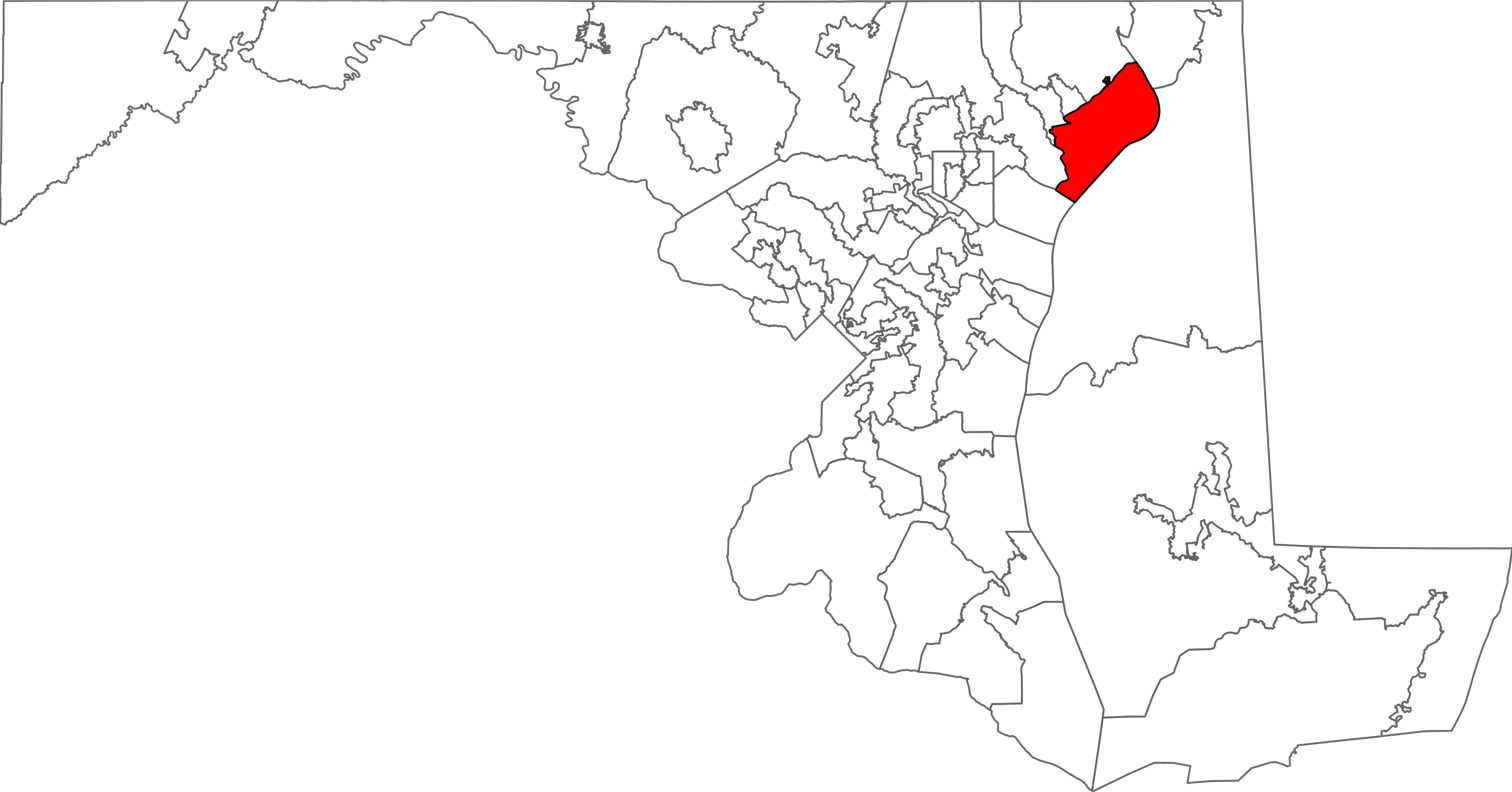
- Delegate(s): Andre Johnson Jr. (D); Steven C. Johnson (D)
- Registration: 48.6% Democratic; 27.9% Republican; 21.7% unaffiliated
- Demographics: 52.5% White; 31.9% Black/African American; 0.4% Native American; 2.8% Asian; 0.1% Hawaiian/Pacific Islander; 3.5% Other race; 8.7% Two or more races; 8.0% Hispanic
- Population (2020): 86,491
- Voting-age population: 66,273
- Registered voters: 57,712

Maryland House of Delegates District 34A is one of the 71 districts that compose the Maryland House of Delegates. Along with subdistrict 34B, it makes up the 34th district of the Maryland Senate. District 34A includes part of Harford County, and is represented by two delegates.

== Demographic characteristics ==
As of the 2020 United States census, the district had a population of 86,491, of whom 66,273 (76.6%) were of voting age. The racial makeup of the district was 45,425 (52.5%) White, 27,586 (31.9%) African American, 385 (0.4%) Native American, 2,438 (2.8%) Asian, 50 (0.1%) Pacific Islander, 3,028 (3.5%) from some other race, and 7,504 (8.7%) from two or more races. Hispanic or Latino of any race were 6,893 (8.0%) of the population.

The district had 57,712 registered voters as of October 17, 2020, of whom 12,529 (21.7%) were registered as unaffiliated, 16,120 (27.9%) were registered as Republicans, 28,046 (48.6%) were registered as Democrats, and 575 (1.0%) were registered to other parties.

== Past Election Results ==
=== 2002 ===
Name	Party	Votes	Percent	Outcome
Charles R. Boutin	Republican	11,182	34.8%	Won
Mary-Dulany James	Democratic	10,947	34.1%	Won
B. Daniel Riley	Democratic	9,957	31.0%	Lost
Other Write-Ins		59	0.2%	

=== 2006 ===
Name	Party	Votes	Percent	Outcome
Mary-Dulany James	Democratic	12,903	31.7%	Won
B. Daniel Riley	Democratic	11,121	27.3%	Won
Glen Glass	Republican	8,554	21.0%	Lost
Sheryl Davis Kohl	Republican	8,085	19.9%	Lost
Other Write-Ins		22	0.1%	

=== 2010 ===
Name	Party	Votes	Percent	Outcome
Mary-Dulany James	Democratic	12,639	29.2%	Won
Glen Glass	Republican	10,931	25.3%	Won
Patrick McGrady	Republican	9,889	22.9%	Lost
Marla Posey-Moss	Democratic	9,745	22.5%	Lost
Other Write-Ins		51	0.1%	

=== 2014 ===
Name	Party	Votes	Percent	Outcome
Glen Glass	Republican	10,779	28.4%	Won
Mary Ann Lisanti	Democratic	10,015	26.4%	Won
Mike Blizzard	Republican	9,041	23.8%	Lost
Marla Posey-Moss	Democratic	8,057	21.2%	Lost
Other Write-Ins		49	0.1%	

=== 2018 ===
Name	Party	Votes	Percent	Outcome
Mary Ann Lisanti	Democratic	13,558	28.5%	Won
Steven C. Johnson	Republican	11,857	24.9%	Won
Glen Glass	Republican	11,692	24.6%	Lost
J. D. Russell	Republican	9,606	20.2%	Lost
Sarahia Benn (as write-in)	Democratic	740	1.6%	Lost
Other Write-Ins		85	0.2%	
