= Mary Ann Lisanti =

American politician (born 1967)

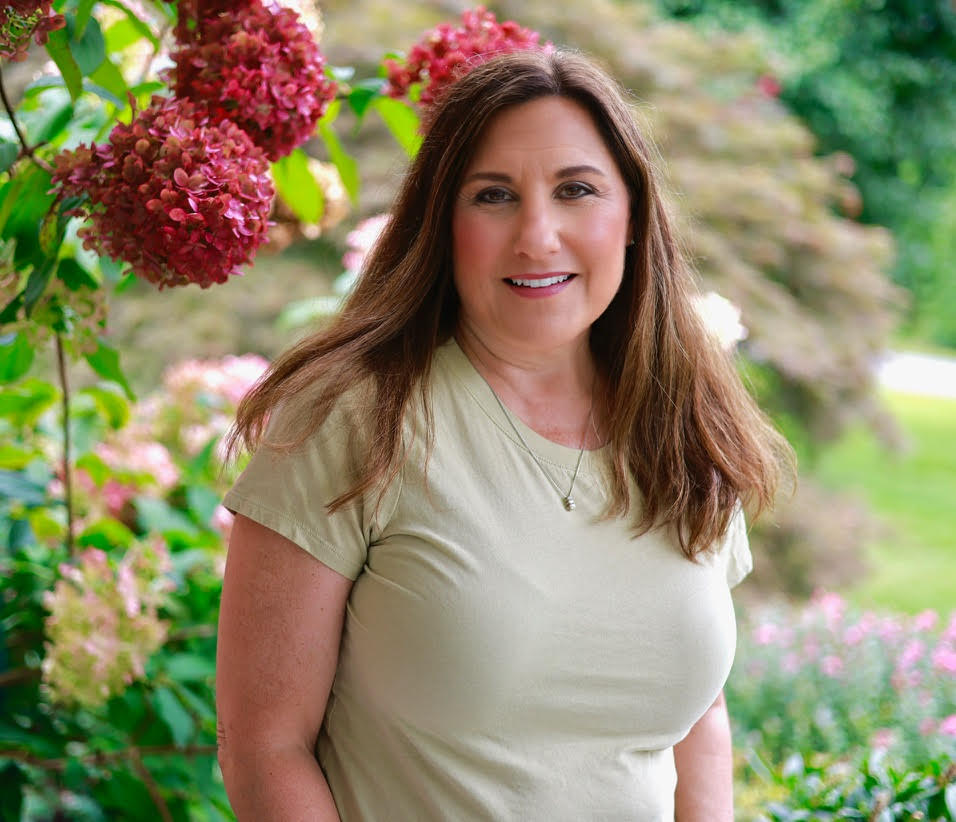

Member of the Maryland House of Delegates from the 34A district
- In office January 13, 2015 – January 11, 2023 Serving with Glen Glass (2015–2019) Steven C. Johnson (2019–2023)
- Preceded by: Mary-Dulany James
- Succeeded by: Andre Johnson Jr.
- Constituency: Harford County

Member of the Harford County Council District F
- In office December 4, 2006 – December 1, 2014
- Preceded by: Cecilia M. Stepp
- Succeeded by: Curtis L. Beulah

Personal details
- Born: October 27, 1967 (age 58) Havre de Grace, Maryland, U.S.
- Party: Democratic
- Education: College of Notre Dame of Maryland (B.A.); Central Michigan University (M.S.)
- Profession: Executive director
- Website: Campaign website Facebook page

Mary Ann Lisanti (born October 27, 1967) is an American politician and a member of the Democratic Party, who represented District 34A in the Maryland House of Delegates. Previously she represented district F on the Harford County Council, representing Havre de Grace, Abingdon, Belcamp/Riverside and Aberdeen Proving Ground. In January 2014 Lisanti filed to run for the Maryland House of Delegates and to not seek a 3rd term on the County Council. She was first elected in 2014 and re-elected in 2018. Before her tenure in the state legislature, she served on the Harford County Council. In early March 2019, the House of Delegates unanimously censured Lisanti for a racial slur directed at the African-American majority Prince George's County, with her own county's Democratic Party calling for her resignation.

== Early life and education ==
Lisanti was born and raised in Havre de Grace, Maryland. She attended Havre de Grace High School, where she was involved in student government. She later earned an undergraduate degree from the College of Notre Dame of Maryland and a master's degree from Central Michigan University.

== Career ==
=== Lower Susquehanna Heritage Greenway ===
Before entering elected office, Lisanti served as executive director of the Lower Susquehanna Heritage Greenway (LSHG), a nonprofit heritage organization serving Harford and Cecil counties. During her tenure, LSHG secured grant funding for heritage and preservation initiatives. In July 2010, the organization received more than $350,000 in grants, including $231,000 in matching funds from the Maryland Heritage Areas Authority to support management, marketing, and preservation projects.

Lisanti promoted the development of a 40-mile trail network along the Susquehanna River to connect historic sites and encourage heritage tourism in the region. She also pursued a $4 million federal grant to support trail building and community linkage.

Under her leadership, LSHG participated in multiple preservation projects, including restoration work at Rodgers Tavern in Perryville, a historic 18th-century structure that received grants from the Maryland Heritage Areas Authority and Maryland General Assembly. The organization also conducted research and mapping of historic canal remnants along the Lower Susquehanna to document and preserve 18th- and 19th-century infrastructure. In April 2013, Lisanti organized the 13th annual River Sweep cleanup, which brought together nearly 300 volunteers to remove debris along the river.

=== Harford County Council (2006–2014) ===
Before her election to the Maryland House of Delegates, Lisanti served two terms on the Harford County Council. Lisanti won election to the council and was sworn into office in December 2006 at a ceremony held at Harford Community College, alongside fellow new council members including James McMahan representing District A (Northern Harford County).

During her tenure on the County Council, Lisanti served on several committees, including the Chesapeake National Historic Trail Advisory Board by President Barack Obama and the County Horse Park Task Force, among others. Maryland Governors Martin O'Malley and Larry Hogan appointed her as Vice Chairman of the State's Growth Commission. Additionally, she chaired the Local Government Advisory Committee, which provided recommendations to the Environmental Protection Agency (EPA).

Lisanti focused on fiscal oversight, questioning the creation of a $10.3 million retiree trust fund in 2008 and opposing cost-of-living and salary increases for elected officials in 2011. She voted against wind-energy system legislation in 2009 and opposed tax increment financing for the Beechtree Estates development in 2010.

On October 18, 2011, Lisanti introduced Resolution No. 28-11 establishing the Harford County Obesity Task Force, recognizing obesity as a public health concern and leading to a final report with nine recommendations developed by community subcommittees focused on healthy food access, the built environment, and public engagement. In 2012, she strongly opposed a proposed Walmart in Abingdon, supporting a council resolution requesting the state deny road access to the site. Lisanti also publicly opposed marijuana legalization in 2014.

Lisanti won re-election in 2010, but did not seek a third term in 2014; instead, she ran for the Maryland House of Delegates. Beyond government service, Lisanti founded Transition Maker, LLC, a consulting firm.

=== 2014 Maryland State Delegate candidacy ===
Lisanti entered the race for Delegate in district 34A after much speculation that she might run for the seat left open when Delegate Mary-Dulany James decided to run for Maryland State Senate. On June 24, 2014, Lisanti led the Democratic primary by nearly 10 percentage points, with Marla Posey-Moss coming in second, after a heavily contested race with five candidates vying for two seats. Lisanti and Posey-Moss faced Republicans Glen Glass and Mike Blizzard in the General election in November. Glass and Lisanti finished 1 and 2, thus gaining election.

=== Maryland House of Delegates ===
Lisanti was elected to the Maryland House of Delegates in 2014 and began serving in the 2015 legislative session. During her tenure, she was involved in various legislative initiatives and initially served on the Economic Matters Committee before being appointed to the House Ways and Means Committee in 2019. She also held leadership roles, including serving as Chair of a subcommittee and as Joint-Chair of the Unemployment Insurance Oversight Committee.

She was a member of multiple caucuses and task forces, including the Maryland Cyber Security Council, Rural Maryland Council, and the Veteran's Caucus.

=== 2022 Maryland State Senate candidacy ===
On January 28, 2022, Lisanti entered the race for State Senate in District 34, seeking to succeed Senator Robert G. Cassilly, who announced his candidacy for Harford County executive in April 2021. Lisanti lost the Democratic primary to Mary-Dulany James.

=== Censure ===
On February 26, 2019, The Washington Post reported that Lisanti referred to a legislative district in Prince George's County, Maryland as a "n----- district" [thus in the original] in conversation with another Democratic legislator. She was removed as the chair of a subcommittee. Two days later she was unanimously censured by the House of Delegates in a 136–0 vote, but refused to resign her seat. On March 2, 2019, the Harford County Democratic Central Committee called for Lisanti to resign for using the racial slur.

== Election results ==
- 2006 Primary Election Results Harford County Council – District F

Voters to choose one:

Name	Votes	Percent	Outcome
Mary Ann Lisanti, Dem.	1,898	64.6%	Won
Gunther Hirsch, Dem.	1,057	35.8%	Lost

- 2006 General Election Results Harford County Council – District F

Voters to choose one:

Name	Votes	Percent	Outcome
Mary Ann Lisnati, Dem.	7,433	60.3%	Won
John P. Correri, Jr., Rep.	4,877	39.6%	Lost
Write-Ins	13	0.1%	Lost

- 2010 General Election Results Harford County Council – District F

Voters to choose one:

Name	Votes	Percent	Outcome
Mary Ann Lisanti, Dem.	7,167	51.8%	Won
Sheryl Davis Kohl, Rep.	6,646	48.1%	Lost
Write-Ins	16	0.1%	Lost

- 2014 Primary Election Results Maryland House of Delegates – District 34A – Harford County

Voters to choose two:

Name	Votes	Percent	Outcome
Mary Ann Lisanti, Dem.	2,473	29.0%	Won
Marla Posey-Moss, Dem.	1,895	22.2%	Won
Pat Murray., Dem.	1,784	20.9%	Lost
Steve Johnson, Dem.	1,574	18.4%	Lost
Maria Terry, Dem.	812	9.5%	Lost

- 2014 General Election Results Maryland House of Delegates – District 34A – Harford County

Voters to choose two:

Name	Votes	Percent	Outcome
Glen Glass, Rep.	10,779	28.41%	Won
Mary Ann Lisanti, Dem.	10,015	26.40%	Won
Mike Blizzard, Rep.	9,041	23.83%	Lost
Marla Posey-Moss, Dem.	8,057	21.24%	Lost
Write-Ins	49	0.13%	Lost

- 2018 Primary Election Results Maryland House of Delegates – District 34A – Harford County

Voters to choose two:

Name	Votes	Percent	Outcome
Mary Ann Lisanti, Dem	3,794	46.8%	Won
Steve Johnson, Dem	2,190	27.0%	Won
Sarahia Benn, Dem	2,123	26.2%	Lost

- 2022 Primary Election Results Maryland Senate – District 34

Voters to choose one:

Name	Votes	Percent	Outcome
Mary-Dulany James, Dem	6,598	65.65%	Won
Mary Ann Lisanti, Dem	3,453	34.35%	Lost
