= Glen Glass =

American politician (born 1965)

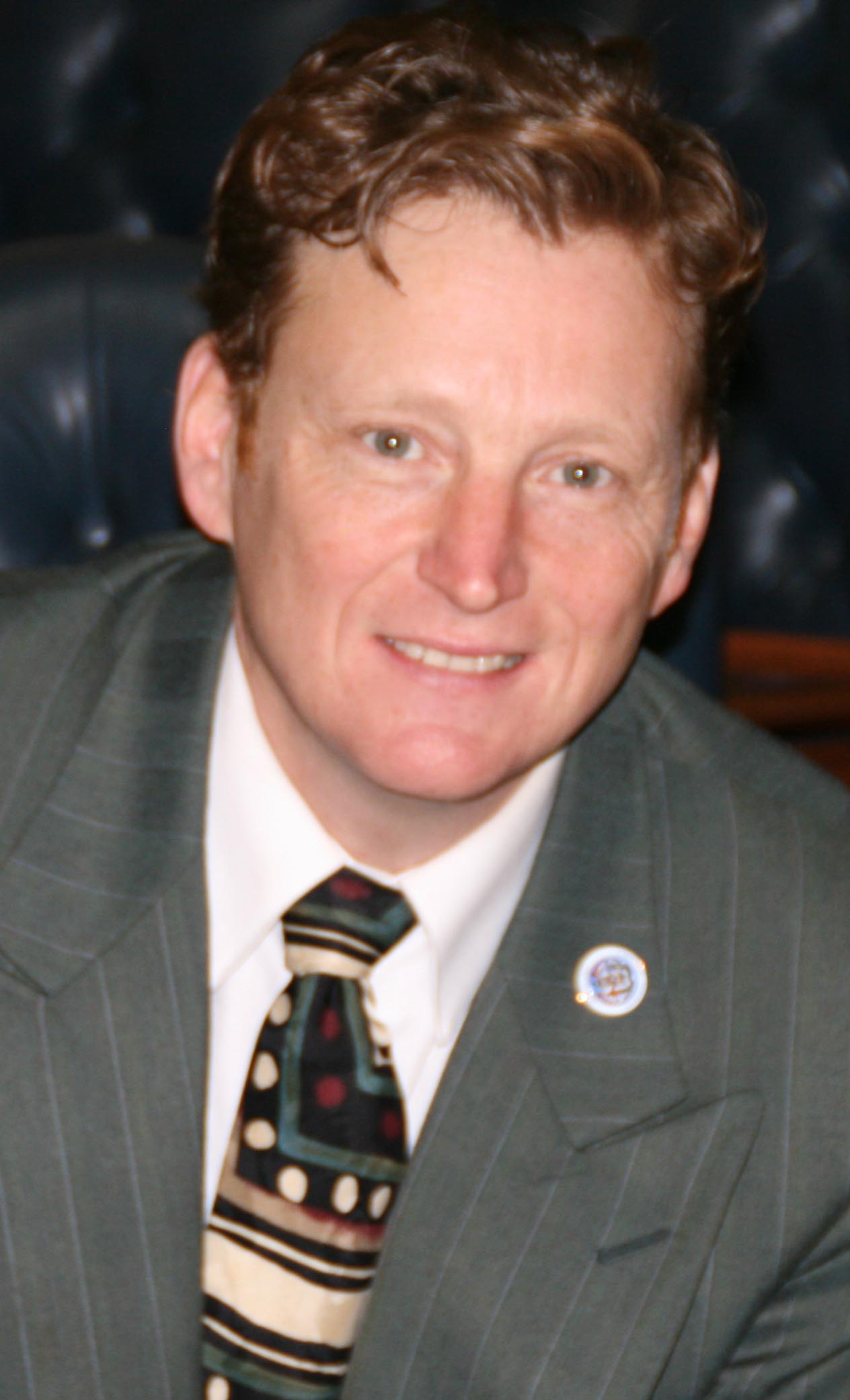

Member of the Maryland House of Delegates from the 34A district
- In office January 12, 2011 – January 9, 2019 Serving with Mary Ann Lisanti
- Preceded by: B. Daniel Riley
- Succeeded by: Steven C. Johnson
- Constituency: Harford County; Cecil County

Personal details
- Born: September 10, 1965 (age 61) Riverdale, Maryland
- Party: Republican
- Children: 1
- Education: Howard Community College (A.A.); University of Baltimore (B.A.)

Military service
- Allegiance: United States
- Branch/service: United States Army
- Years of service: 1987–1989

Glen Glass (born September 10, 1965) is an American politician from Maryland and a member of the Republican Party. He is a former member of the Maryland House of Delegates from District 34A in Cecil County and Harford County.

== Biography ==
Glen Glass was born on September 10, 1965, in Riverdale, Maryland. He earned a GED from Hope High School in 1988. He later attended Howard Community College, where he earned an A.A. (business management) in 1993, then a B.A. from the University of Baltimore in 1994.

Glass served in the United States Army from 1987 to 1989. He worked as a teacher at the Northeast Middle School in Baltimore. He has worked as an environmental services specialist with FCC Environmental since 2000. Glass served as a member of the Maryland House of Delegates, representing District 34A in Cecil County and Harford County, from January 12, 2011, to January 9, 2019.

Glass is married with one child.

== Election results ==
- 2014 General Election Results Maryland House of Delegates – District 34A - Harford County

Voters to choose two:

Name	Votes	Percent	Outcome
Glen Glass, Rep.	10,779	28.41%	Won
Mary Ann Lisanti, Dem.	10,015	26.40%	Won
Mike Blizzard, Rep.	9,041	23.83%	Lost
Marla Posey-Moss, Dem.	8,057	21.24%	Lost
Write-Ins	49	0.13%	Lost

- 2010 General Election Results Maryland House of Delegates – District 34A - Cecil & Harford County

Voters to choose two:

Name	Votes	Percent	Outcome
Mary-Dulany James, Dem.	12,639	29.2%	Won
Glen Glass, Rep.	10,931	25.3%	Won
Patrick McGrady, Rep.	9,889	22.9%	Lost
Marla Posey-Moss, Dem.	9,745	22.5%	Lost
Write-Ins	51	0.1%	Lost

- 2006 General Election Results Maryland House of Delegates – District 34A - Cecil & Harford County

Voters to choose two:

Name	Votes	Percent	Outcome
Mary-Dulany James, Dem.	12,697	31.7%	Won
B. Daniel Riley, Dem.	10,969	27.3%	Won
Glen Glass, Rep.	8,554	21.0%	Lost
Sheryl Davis Kohl, Rep.	8,085	19.9%	Lost
Write-Ins	22	0.1%	Lost
