= Fallston High School =

Location
- Fallston, Maryland; United States; 39°31′19″N 76°24′47.5″W

Information
- Type: Public Secondary
- Motto: "A Proud Tradition of Excellence"
- Established: 1977
- School district: Harford County Public Schools
- Principal: Joseph M. Collins
- Teaching staff: 62.25 (on an FTE basis)
- Grades: 9–12
- Enrollment: 973 (2019–2020)
- Student to teacher ratio: 15.63
- Campus: Suburban
- Colors: Orange and Brown
- Mascot: Cougar (named 'Gar')
- Newspaper: The Print
- Website: fahs.hcpsschools.org/o/fahs

Fallston High School is a public high school Fallston, Maryland, United States. It serves approximately a thousand students of Harford County.

== History ==
With increasing population growth in this area of once-rural Harford County during the 1970s, the Board of Education determined the need for a secondary school to serve the youth of Fallston. Fallston High School was designed by architect Richard Ayres and built by Cam Construction Company at a cost of $10 million. The ground on which the school is built was formerly a dairy farm. The land was acquired from local Real Estate developer Mr. Joseph Deigert, with an adjacent four acres set aside as a new home for the Fallston Volunteer Fire Company. Fallston High School opened in November 1977 with a staff of 73 and a student population of 1400 in grades 6 through 10, with grades 11 and 12 added in subsequent years. The majority of the original Fallston students transferred from Bel Air schools. Initially the school was a combined Middle/High School but was converted solely to a High School (9-12) with the opening of Fallston Middle School (6th-8th grades) on an adjacent piece of property in 1993. Fallston High School was visited by President Reagan during his time as president on December 4, 1985. The school has a conference room named the Reagan Room to commemorate his visit.

== Extracurricular activities ==
There are over 40 clubs available to students, including competitive and non-competitive activities. To keep students' focus on academic achievement, the school has an Eligibility Committee to review student academic progress. If a student enrolled in an extracurricular activity is failing in one or more subject, he or she will be declared ineligible to participate in extracurricular activities.

=== Athletics ===
Maryland Public Secondary Schools Athletic Association (MPSSAA) Sanctioned Sports

Participate in the Upper Chesapeake Bay Athletic Conference

Fall: Field Hockey, Football, Men's and Women's Soccer, Cross Country, Cheerleading, Men's and Women's Volleyball, Golf

Winter: Men's and Women's Basketball, Wrestling, Cheerleading, Indoor Track, Men's and Women's Swimming

Spring: Baseball, Softball, Men's and Women's Lacrosse, Track & Field, Tennis

Non-Sanctioned Sports: Ice Hockey, Bowling

Maryland State Championship Teams

- Men's Cross Country: 1981
- Men's Lacrosse : 1985, 1987, 2001, 2012, 2013, 2014, 2016, 2021, 2023, 2024
- Women's Field Hockey: 1988, 1989, 1990, 1993, 1994, 1996, 1998, 1999, 2001, 2007, 2008, 2009, 2011, 2012
- Men's Soccer: 1992
- Women's Soccer: 1994, 1996, 2009, 2015, 2021, 2022
- Women's Softball : 2004
- Women's Indoor Track : 2005
- Men's Swimming : 2007, 2008, 2009, 2011
- Women's Basketball : 2009, 2010, 2022
- Women's Lacrosse : 2009, 2012, 2024
- Women's Volleyball: 2010
- Ice Hockey: 2010
- Fall Cheerleading: 2021, 2022, 2023

=== Academics, arts, and cultural ===
==== Honor societies and selective groups ====
- German National Honor Society
- Spanish National Honor Society
- French National Honor Society
- National Honor Society
- National English Honors Society
- Rho Kappa Social Studies National Honors Society
- Student Government Association
- International Thespians Society
- Mu Alpha Theta
- National Business Honor Society
- Science National Honor Society
- Tri-M Music Honor Society

==== Competitive organizations ====
- Dance Team (suspended operations in 2017): State Champions 2008, 2011
- It's Academic
- Envirothon Team
- Marching Band
  - The Fallston High School Cougar Marching Band toured in the Tournament of Bands circuit, as well as the Cavalcade of Bands circuit. It has been to the Atlantic Coast Championships of the Tournament of Bands in the years 1997, 1999, 2001, 2003, 2005, and 2006. After 2006, the Band stopped competition but continues to play at football games and parades.

== Notable alumni ==
- Sheryl Davis Kohl, former member of Maryland House of Delegates, graduated in 1980
- Chase Kalisz, swimmer, member of the USA 2016, 2020, and 2024 Summer Olympics teams, Olympic Gold (2020) and Silver (2016) Medalist in the 400 Individual Medley, graduated in 2012
- Kimmie Meissner, member of the USA 2006 Winter Olympics team, 2007 U.S. Figure Skating Champion, and 2006 World Figure Skating Champion, graduated in 2007

== Notable events ==
- Then-U.S. President Ronald Reagan visited the school on December 4, 1985.
- Fallston High was featured in Sports Illustrated magazine (February 20, 2006 issue) for the Kimmie Meissner Olympic "Send Off."
- Daniel "Rudy" Ruettiger (Notre Dame University) came to Fallston High as a public speaker.
- Former Attorney General of the United States Edwin Meese III visited the school in 2005.
- Selected by Newsweek Magazine as one of America's top public High Schools in 2009, 2010 and 2012.

== Sources ==
- Harford County Public Schools
- http://www.newsweek.com/feature/2009/americas-best-high-schools/list.html
- http://www.newsweek.com/feature/2010/americas-best-high-schools/list.html
- https://www.usnews.com/education/best-high-schools/maryland/districts/harford-county-public-schools/fallston-high-9116
- http://mshl.org/news.php?news_id=249123
