= West Hartford Public Schools =

School district in Connecticut, United States

Address
- 50 South Main Street West Hartford, Connecticut 06107 United States

District information
- Type: Public
- Grades: Pre-K-12
- Superintendent: Paul Vicinus
- Schools: 18
- Budget: 226,856,566

West Hartford Public Schools provides education for West Hartford, Hartford County, Connecticut, United States.

== Schools ==
=== High schools ===
- Conard High School
- Hall High School

=== Middle schools ===
- Bristow Middle School
- King Philip Middle School
- Sedgwick Middle School

Students are assigned, based on the location of their residence, to either King Phillip or Sedgwick Middle School. Matriculation to Bristow is based on a lottery. Bristow is the smallest of the three middle schools.

=== Elementary schools ===
- Aiken
- Braeburn
- Bugbee
- Charter Oak
- Duffy
- Morley
- Norfeldt
- Smith
- Webster Hill
- Whiting Lane
- Wolcott

== Budget ==
=== 2023 ===
In March 2023, superintendent Tom Moore proposed a $176.3 million budget for the 2023-2024 academic year, an increase of 2.28% or $3.93 million. Increases in the budget are a result of salary increases, student outplacement, and transportation for additional busses for special education needs.

== Demographics ==
As of October 1, 2018, the student population was 0.1% American Indian, 10.9% Asian, 8.1% Black, 19.4% Hispanic (of any race), 0.1% Native Hawaiian, 56.5% White, and 4.9% two or more races.

== Controversies ==
=== LaToya Fernandez ===
On September 5, 2023 the West Hartford board of education voted 4-0 for Democrat LaToya Fernandez to fill out the remaining time in Jason O. Chang's term. West Hartford Board of Education Chairperson Lorna Thomas-Farquharson supported Fernandez by saying, "I think it again demonstrates that we don't take steps like this lightly," she said. "It is important to recognize that there are many pieces that contribute to a person and what they stand for and what they represent." Fernandez was hired as the City of Norwalk's first Chief Diversity Equity and Inclusion Officer for the city. As of February 2024 Fernandez has quit her position with the city of Norwalk. While she was a community advocate in San Jose, California, Fernandez supported H.R. 2590, a federal bill aimed at restricting Israel from using U.S. aid to “support Israel’s military occupation,” demolish Palestinian homes, or use military law to detain Palestinian children. She has also supported numerous "Defund the police" movements.

=== High school mascots and nicknames ===
In 2015, the board of education voted to allow Conard and Hall high schools to keep their nicknames, Chieftain and Warrior, respectively, "provided all Native American imagery, including mascots, were eliminated."

In 2022, the board voted to end the use of the nicknames. A new state law would have cut some education funding if "an intramural or interscholastic athletic team associated with such school, uses any name, symbol or image that depicts, refers to or is associated with a state or federally recognized Native American tribe or a Native American individual, custom or tradition, as a mascot, nickname, logo or team name." The schools will choose new nicknames.

=== Later high school start times ===
In November 2019 the board of education removed a plan to have the schools start at a later start time. The claim is that later start times for high school students is more beneficial for their mental and physical health. The cost of transportation would exceed $2 million if high school and middle school started at 8:15. The issue was brought up again at a board of education meeting in February 2020. At this meeting, the West Hartford Board of Education supported a statewide move to require that students in grades 6-12 begin academic classes no earlier than 8:30 a.m. so they can arrive at school “healthy, awake, alert, and ready to learn.”

== Superintendents ==
- Paul Vicinus, 2023-present
- Tom Moore, 2014-2022. Moore was named the 2022 Superintendent of the Year by the Connecticut Association of Public School Superintendents.
- Dr. Karen List, 2009-2014
- Dr. David P. Sklarz, 1995-2009
