= Sheryl Davis Kohl =

American politician (born 1962)

Member of the Maryland House of Delegates from the 34A district
- In office July 27, 2005 – January 10, 2007
- Preceded by: Charles R. Boutin
- Succeeded by: B. Daniel Riley
- Constituency: Harford County, Cecil County

Personal details
- Born: January 3, 1962 (age 64) Baltimore, Maryland, U.S.
- Party: Republican
- Education: Albright College (BA); University of Baltimore (MPA)

Sheryl Davis Kohl (born January 3, 1962) is an American politician who represented District 34A in the Maryland House of Delegates.

== Background ==
Born in Baltimore, Maryland on January 3, 1962, Kohl was appointed by Republican Governor Robert Ehrlich to the Maryland House of Delegates in July 2005 to replace Charles R. Boutin, who resigned when he was appointed by Ehrlich to become a member of the Maryland Public Service Commission.

== Education ==
Kohl attended Youth's Benefit Elementary School in Fallston, MD before attending Fallston High School. She later graduated from Albright College with a Bachelor of Arts in political science in 1984. In 1986, she earned a Master of Public Administration from the University of Baltimore.

== In the legislature ==
While a member of the Maryland House of Delegates, Kohl was a member of the Health and Government Operations Committee, the Women Legislators of Maryland, and the Maryland Veterans Caucus.

Kohl was defeated in her first election by Democrats Mary-Dulany James and B. Daniel Riley. Delegate Riley was the delegate prior to Boutin when District 36 was represented by 3 delegates. In 2002, the districts were redrawn and Riley lost to Boutin in a 2 delegate District 34A.

In 2010, Kohl attempted to re-enter elected office by running for a seat on the Harford County Council. She lost to incumbent Councilwoman Mary Ann Lisanti.

Kohl is now the owner of a temporary business staffing services company, Beacon Staffing, and was recently appointed to a commission to study government operation and spending by Harford County Executive David R. Craig.

== Election results ==
- 2006 Race for Maryland House of Delegates – District 34A - Cecil & Harford County

Voters to choose two:

Name	Votes	Percent	Outcome
Mary-Dulany James, Dem.	12,697	31.7%	Won
B. Daniel Riley, Dem.	10,969	27.3%	Won
Glen Glass, Rep.	8,554	21.0%	Lost
Sheryl Davis Kohl, Rep.	8,085	19.9%	Lost
Write-Ins	22	0.1%	Lost
