= B. Daniel Riley =

American politician

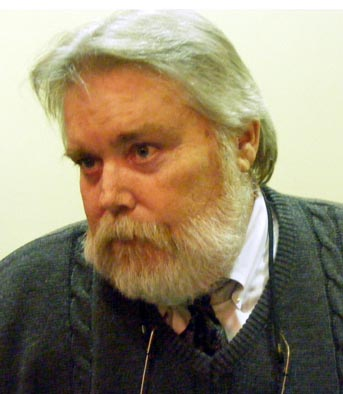

Member of the Maryland House of Delegates from the 34A district
- In office January 2007 – January 2011
- Preceded by: Sheryl Davis Kohl
- Succeeded by: Glen Glass
- Constituency: Harford County, Cecil County

Delegate District 34
- In office 1999–2003
- Preceded by: Rose Mary Hatem Bonsack
- Succeeded by: Charles R. Boutin

Personal details
- Born: February 16, 1946 London, England, UK
- Died: August 31, 2016 (aged 70) Bel Air, Maryland, U.S.
- Party: Democratic
- Spouse: Linda D. Riley
- Education: Towson University (BS, MA)
- Occupation: Politician, teacher

B. Daniel Riley (February 16, 1946 – August 31, 2016) was an American politician who represented District 34A in the Maryland House of Delegates.

== Background ==
Born in London, England, he was a Harford County social studies teacher from 1978 until 2006.

== Education ==
Riley attended Baltimore City College high school and graduated in 1964. He graduated from Towson State University with his B.S. (education) in 1978 and with his M.A. (education) in 1984.

== In the legislature ==
Riley has had two separate terms as a member of House of Delegates. Initially he served from January 13, 1999, to January 8, 2003, representing District 34 (Harford County), and more recently he served from January 10, 2007, to January 9, 2011, representing District 34A (Cecil & Harford Counties). Riley lost his bid to return to the legislature for the 2011 term when he lost in the 2010 democratic primary by 57 votes. Riley was a member of the Health and Government Operations Committee. In his first term he was a member of the Commerce and Government Matters Committee and its transportation subcommittee.

=== Legislative notes ===
Maryland League of Conservation Voters, which consists of all the major Maryland environmental organizations, gave Delegate Riley a 100% voting record, on environmental issues for the 2008 session. Delegate Riley's lifetime score is 86%.

- voted for the Maryland Gang Prosecution Act of 2007 (HB713), subjecting gang members to up to 20 years in prison and/or a fine of up to $100,000
- voted for Jessica's Law (HB 930), eliminating parole for the most violent child sexual predators and creating a mandatory minimum sentence of 25 years in state prison, 2007
- voted for Public Safety – Statewide DNA Database System – Crimes of Violence and Burglary – Post conviction (HB 370), helping to give police officers and prosecutors greater resources to solve crimes and eliminating a backlog of 24,000 unanalyzed DNA samples, leading to 192 arrests, 2008
- voted for Vehicle Laws – Repeated Drunk and Drugged Driving Offenses – Suspension of License (HB 293), strengthening Maryland's drunk driving laws by imposing a mandatory one year license suspension for a person convicted of drunk driving more than once in five years, 2009
- voted for HB 102, creating the House Emergency Medical Services System Workgroup, leading to Maryland's budgeting of $52 million to fund three new Medevac helicopters to replace the State's aging fleet, 2009

== Election results ==
- 2006 Race for Maryland House of Delegates – District 34A - Cecil & Harford County

Voters to choose two:

| Name | Votes | Percent | Outcome |
|---|---|---|---|
| Mary Dulany James, Dem. | 12,697 | 31.7% | Won |
| B. Daniel Riley, Dem. | 10,969 | 27.3% | Won |
| Glen Glass, Rep. | 8,554 | 21.0% | Lost |
| Sheryl Davis Kohl, Rep. | 8,085 | 19.9% | Lost |
| Write-Ins | 22 | 0.1% | Lost |

- 2002 Race for Maryland House of Delegates – District 34A - Cecil & Harford County

Voters to choose two:

| Name | Votes | Percent | Outcome |
|---|---|---|---|
| Charles R. Boutin, Rep. | 11,182 | 34.8% | Won |
| Mary Dulany James, Dem. | 10,947 | 34.1% | Won |
| B. Daniel Riley, Dem. | 9,957 | 31.0% | Lost |
| Write-Ins | 59 | 0.2% | Lost |

- 1998 Race for Maryland House of Delegates – District 36 - Harford County

Voters to choose three:

| Name | Votes | Percent | Outcome |
|---|---|---|---|
| Mary Dulany James, Dem. | 18,357 | 18% | Won |
| Charles R. Boutin, Rep. | 17,844 | 18% | Won |
| B. Daniel Riley, Dem. | 17,798 | 18% | Won |
| Robert E. Shaffner, Rep. | 16,236 | 16% | Lost |
| Robin Walter, Dem. | 15,370 | 15% | Lost |
| Michael Griffin, Rep. | 15,207 | 15% | Lost |
