= Conard High School =

Location
- 110 Beechwood Road; West Hartford, Connecticut 06107; United States
- 41°44′12″N 72°45′08″W

Information
- Type: Public school
- Motto: 'Diversity is Strength'
- Established: 1957 (69 years ago)
- School district: West Hartford Public Schools
- Superintendent: Paul Vicinus
- CEEB code: 070887
- Principal: Jocelyn Tamborello-Noble
- Teaching staff: 100.30 (FTE)
- Grades: 9-12
- Enrollment: 1,402 (2023-2024)
- Student to teacher ratio: 13.98
- Colors: Red and gray
- Team name: Red Wolves
- Rivals: Hall High School
- Newspaper: The Conard Courant
- Website: conard.whps.org

Frederick U. Conard High School is a public high school in West Hartford, in the U.S. state of Connecticut. It opened in 1957, and was named after Frederick Underwood Conard, president of Niles-Bement-Pond Company and chairman of the local Board of Education when plans for the school were approved. Conard is one of two West Hartford public high schools, the other being Hall High School.

== History ==
Conard's first classes were held on September 4, 1957. While Conard was originally designed to accommodate 1,100 students, it now accommodates 2,870.

On February 23, 2015, fans of Conard and Hall High School basketball were involved in a physical conflict at their annual end-of-season rivalry game.

At the end of the 2021-2022 School Season, the students, staff, and Board of Education of West Hartford Public Schools were prompted to vote for mascots which Conard and Hall High Schools would change theirs to, respectively. For Conard, "Red Wolves" won with a substantially higher vote.

== Academics ==
- Blue Ribbon School in 1984–85.

== Athletics ==
Conard High School is part of the Central Connecticut Conference (CCC), competing in the West Division. The Board of Education added varsity sports for girls in January 1972.

Conard's Gavin Sherry was three time Gatorade POY (Player of the year) recipient.

The boys cross country team won the CIAC Class LL title and runner up at the CIAC state open championship in the fall of 2019.

The boys ice hockey team won the CIAC Division II ice hockey championships in 1985 and 1996.

The girls horse polo team won the CIAC Division I horse polo championships in 1976 and 1983. The horse polo team was abolished in 1987.

=== CIAC State Championships ===
Team	Year
Wrestling	1975, 1976, 1980, 1981, 1982, 2015
Girls Cross Country	1975, 1976, 1978, 2006
Boys Ice Hockey	1985, 1996, 2024, 2025
Boys Cross Country	1974, 2005, 2019
Boys Golf	1962, 1969, 1971
Girls Horse Polo	1976, 1983
Girls Gymnastics	1991, 1992
Girls Outdoor Track	1979, 2023
Boys Soccer	1970
Girls Swimming	2007
Girls Basketball	1979
Boys Outdoor Track	1963
Softball	2011

== Notable alumni ==
- Veronica Belmont, class of 2000, internet personality
- Marcus Camby, professional basketball player (transferred before graduating)
- Justin R. Clark, class of 1993, Director of the White House Office of Intergovernmental Affairs
- Peter Dante, actor ("Grandma's Boy," "Big Daddy," "Mr. Deeds," "Little Nicky")
- Nancy Dow, class of 1958, actress, mother of Jennifer Aniston
- Kevin Galvin, business/health care advocate (CVS)
- Mike Joy, auto racing announcer
- Paul Lieberstein, class of 1985, actor (The Office)
- Brett McGurk, class of 1991; United States National Security Council, Director for Iraq
- David Naughton, class of 1969, actor (An American Werewolf in London)
- James Naughton, actor, winner of the Tony Award for Best Performance by a Leading Actor in a Musical (1990, 1997)
- Owen Painter, class of 2016, actor, best known for his role as Isaac Night / Slurp in the Netflix series Wednesday
- Robert Romanus, actor Fast Times at Ridgemont High, class of 1974
- Jimmy Shea, class of 1987, 2002 Olympic gold medal winner
- Matt Sinatro, class of 1978, Major League Baseball player and coach
- Jack Sonni, class of 1972, rhythm guitarist for Dire Straits
- Patricia Stich, actress
- Seth Waxman, class of 1969, Solicitor General of the United States
