= Maryland Office of Administrative Hearings =

Independent, central panel agency

The Maryland Office of Administrative Hearings (OAH) is an independent, central panel agency that holds administrative hearings on behalf of certain agencies of the executive branch of the state government. For example, it may hold hearings pertaining to the suspension or revocation of a driver's license, and it also holds hearings when the Maryland Human Relations Commission determines that there is probable cause to believe that an employer or business has committed an act of discrimination. The OAH conducts hearings in over 60,000 matters each year of which approximately one-half concern issues from the state Motor Vehicle Administration.

In addition, the OAH provides a mediation service; for example, special education hearing requests often result in mediation. Also, as a pilot project in conjunction with the District Court, it offers mediation of civil disputes in Baltimore County.

The OAH has no state policy making authority, and in hearing a case uses the policies, regulations, and rules of the agency for which the OAH is conducting the hearing. The OAH does have its own rules of procedure which it uses to ensure a uniform application of administrative law in its decisions.

The main offices of the OAH are in Hunt Valley, although it holds hearings in all counties in the state.

== Organization and authority ==
The OAH is headed by a Chief Administrative Law Judge, who is appointed by the governor with the advice and consent of the state senate. The Chief Administrative Law Judge then appoints individual administrative law judges. The Chief Administrative Law Judge and the appointed administrative law judge both have the authority to hear cases. Administrative law judges have the authority to compel the appearance of witnesses at a hearing. The right of appeal is generally limited to a review of the record of the proceedings before the administrative law judge; that is, if a party appeals the final decision of an administrative law judge to a Maryland circuit court, the court will decide the case based on the evidence that was brought before the administrative law judge, or may order the administrative law judge to conduct further proceedings, but will not conduct a new trial. (Therefore, it is essential that all parties to an administrative hearing be fully prepared.)

The OAH is governed by state law, including title 9 subtitle 16 and title 10 subtitle 2 of the State Government article of the Annotated Code of Maryland.

== History ==
The OAH was created in 1990 by legislation enacted in 1989 to provide impartial and independent administrative law judges to hear agency cases. Prior to that, each Maryland agency conducted its own hearings, an administrative process that was criticized as the deciding officer was either an employee or member of the agency, creating the possibility of a lack of impartiality. In addition, there were no uniform training or qualifications for the 92 hearing examiners that were distributed among the various state agencies. The formation of the OAH allowed for a lesser number of administrative law judges, currently numbering around 60, to receive specialized training on administrative law.

== See also ==
- United States administrative law
