= Havre de Grace High School =

Coordinates: 39.5479°N 76.0958°W

Location
- 445 Lewis Lane; Havre de Grace, Maryland; United States

Information
- Type: Public Secondary
- Motto: Enter to Learn, Leave to Serve.
- Established: 1896 (previous) 1955 (700 Congress Ave. Site) 2020 (Current Site)
- School district: Harford County Public Schools
- Principal: Brad M. Spence
- Grades: 9-12
- Enrollment: 699 (2020-2021)
- Capacity: 835
- Colors: Maroon, White, Gold
- Mascot: Warrior
- Website: hdhs.hcpsschools.org/o/hdhs
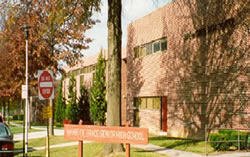

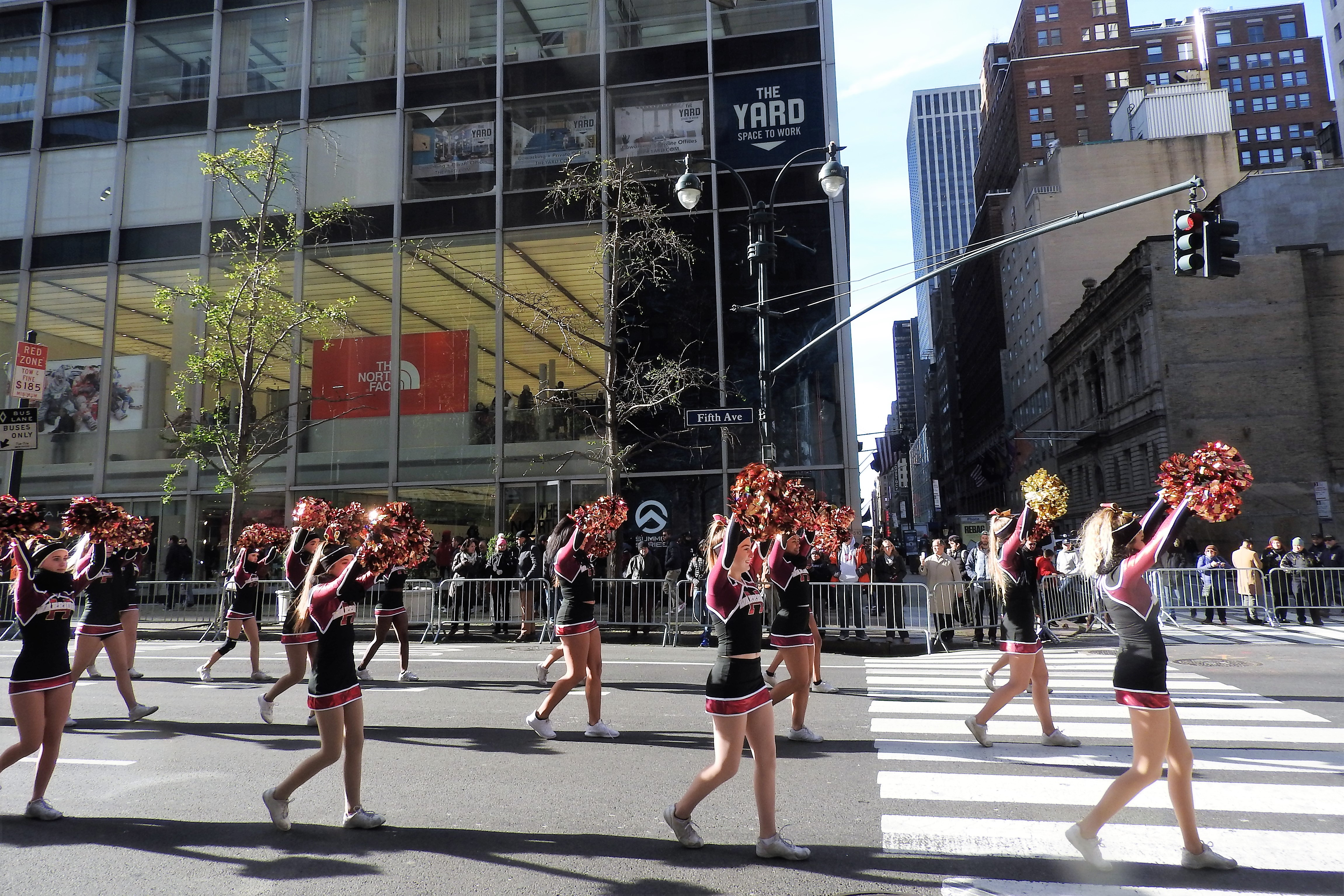
Parade in New York

Havre de Grace High School (HDGHS or HHS) is a four-year public high school in Havre de Grace in Harford County, Maryland, United States. The school is located near the southeast corner of Harford County where the Susquehanna River meets the Chesapeake Bay. The school motto is "Enter to Learn — Leave to Serve."

== About the school ==
The current Havre de Grace High School was established in 1955. A previous building was built in 1896, but was razed and replaced with Havre de Grace Elementary School. The school is named after the town of Havre de Grace, which received its name from the Marquis de La Fayette, the French general. The town was previously known as Susquehanna Lower Ferry.

The building is 143,612 square feet (13,342.0 m^{2}) on a little over 11 acres (45,000 m^{2}) and according to Maryland state records, the primary structure was built in 1961. In 2020, the new Havre de Grace Middle/High School structure was opened. In 1991, Havre de Grace High School was designated as a National School of Excellence.

Havre de Grace High School operates on a four-period day schedule, with the school day beginning at 7:30 AM and ending at 2:00 PM. Students are enrolled in eight classes for the year. Some classes will meet daily for a semester, while other classes meet every other day. This schedule provides longer periods of instruction (82 minutes per period) with fewer class changes.

The Havre De Grace School District borders the Aberdeen, North Harford and C. Milton Wright school districts.

== Students ==
The student population at Havre de Grace High School has increased from 607 in 2017 to 699 in 2021. Over the same time period, the graduation rate decreased from 93.33% in 2017 to 84.03% in 2021.

== Sports ==
Havre de Grace High School is classified as 1A for Regional and State athletic contests. The school is also a member of the competitive Upper Chesapeake Bay Athletic Conference (UCBAC), which comprises high schools in both Harford and Cecil Counties.

Fall Sports: Girls Soccer, Boys Soccer, Field Hockey, Football, Girls Volleyball, Boys Volleyball, Golf (coed)

Winter Sports: Girls Basketball, Boys Basketball, Wrestling, Swimming, Indoor Track

Spring Sports: Softball, Baseball, Girls Lacrosse, Boys Lacrosse, Girls Track, Boys Track, Girls Tennis, Boys Tennis

CHAMPIONSHIPS

Football: State Champions 1976, 1978, 1981, 1986 Boys Soccer: State Champions 1926, 1A Regional Champions 2011, 2012, 2013, 2014

Girls Soccer: 1A State Champions 2023

Boys Basketball: 1A Regional Champions 1986, 1988

Girls Volleyball: 1A Regional Champions 2006, 2007

Girls Lacrosse: 1A/2A Regional Champions 2007

Baseball: 1A Regional Champions 2005, State Champions 1988

Boys Lacrosse: 1A/2A Regional Champions 2006

Track and Field: Many individual Regional and State event champions, Girls 1A North regional champions 2000

Numerous other Harford County and UCBAC conference titles.

== Notable alumni ==
- David R. Craig - Former Harford County Executive
- Jason C. Gallion (born 1977), Maryland state senator
- Barry Glassman - Harford County Executive
- Thomas J. Hatem (1925–1985), Maryland delegate
- David Hutsell - American Professional Golfer
- Mary-Dulany James - Former Maryland State Delegate
- Robert R. Lawder (1894–1967), state politician and mayor of Havre de Grace
- Mary Ann Lisanti - Maryland State Delegate, District 34A
- Lena L. Moore (died 1969), Maryland delegate
- G. Arnold Pfaffenbach (1904–1982), Maryland state delegate and lawyer

== Havre de Grace High School in the news ==
In 2000, "Young Americans", a WB network summer series, was filmed in Havre de Grace. The show starred a young Katherine Moennig of "The L Word", Kate Bosworth of "Blue Crush" and "21", and Ian Somerhalder of "LOST" and "The Vampire Diaries".

In the spring of 2007, Havre de Grace High School government and history teacher Gary Wasielewski ran a campaign for mayor of the City of Havre de Grace. Wasielewski also served two previous terms on the Havre de Grace City Council from May 2003 to May 2007.

The 2007/2008 movie From Within was filmed in Havre de Grace, including a scene in which the high school auditorium was transformed into an evangelical church. Many students from the school as well as other members of the community served as extras in the scene. The movie stars Adam Goldberg as well as Thomas Dekker and Rumer Willis. The former Havre de Grace High School drama teacher, Mark Cummins, also played a small speaking role in the film.

== References and notes ==
- See also List of Schools in Harford County, Maryland
