= SustiNet (Connecticut) =

Connecticut health care plan passed into law in July 2009

Access Health CT

Agency overview
- Jurisdiction: Health insurance for U.S. state of Connecticut
- Website: www.ct.gov/sustinet

SustiNet is a Connecticut health care plan passed into law in July 2009. Its goal was to provide affordable health care coverage to 98% of Connecticut residents by 2014. The name SustiNet derives from the motto of the State of Connecticut: "Qui transtulit sustinet." (Latin: "[He] Who Transplanted [Still] Sustains").

== Provisions ==
The SustiNet law established a nine-member board to recommend to the legislature, by January 1, 2011, the details of and implementation process for a self-insured health care plan called SustiNet. The recommendations will address (1) the phased-in offering of the SustiNet plan to state employees and retirees, HUSKY A and B beneficiaries, people without employer-sponsored insurance (ESI) or with unaffordable ESI, small and large employers, and others; (2) establishing an entity that can contract with insurers and health care providers, set reimbursement rates, develop medical homes for patients, and encourage the use of health information technology; (3) a model benefits package; and (4) public outreach and ways to identify uninsured citizens.

SustiNet emphasizes preventive care and the management of chronic illnesses. It creates a large health insurance pool by combining state employees, retirees, and people covered by state assistance programs. The pool will also be open to members of the public without insurance, those with inadequate insurance, and employers, starting with small businesses, nonprofits and municipalities. Eventually, SustiNet will be open to larger employers wishing to buy into the plan for their employees.

The board establishes committees to make recommendations to it about health information technology, medical homes, clinical care and safety guidelines, and preventive care and improved health outcomes. The act also establishes an independent information clearinghouse to inform employers, consumers, and the public about SustiNet and private health care plans and creates task forces to address obesity, tobacco usage, and health care workforce issues. The effective date of the SustiNet law was July 1, 2009 for most provisions.

== History ==
Since 2005, Universal Health Care Foundation of Connecticut has developed relationships with several key groups that would be instrumental in creating broad change in the health system, including medical societies, hospitals, businesses, labor and clergy. In January 2009, the foundation unveiled SustiNet, a proposal for a statewide health care plan for Connecticut that would provide residents with their choice of health coverage and care regardless of their employment status, age, or pre-existing conditions. An estimated 1,000 people attended a rally at Union Station (Hartford) for the release of the plan.

In February, the 18,500-member Connecticut Association of Realtors announced its support for the SustiNet health care plan. Realtors are independent contractors and are representative of the plight of many independent contractors and small business employees in Connecticut in that they do not have access to group health insurance. Also in that month, the independent statewide organization "Small Businesses for Health Care Reform" endorsed the SustiNet health care reform proposal and encouraged other business owners to review and support it. In March 2009, the foundation's SustiNet plan was formally endorsed by the Interfaith Fellowship for Universal Health Care, a group devoted to health reform, as well as by dozens of other religious leaders representing a wide range of faiths in Connecticut. Fellowship members include Rabbi Stephen Fuchs of Congregation Beth Israel in West Hartford, a co-chairman of the Interfaith Fellowship, and Bilal Ansari, a Muslim chaplain at Saint Francis Hospital & Medical Center in Hartford, where much of his counseling involves helping families cope with not just the stress of a relative's illness, but the worries about how they will pay for it.

SustiNet passed its first legislative hurdle Thursday, March 26, receiving an endorsement from the state legislature's Public Health Committee. The committee voted 22–8 to move the bill forward. On April 22, SustiNet received a favorable report from a second committee, the Human Services Committee, which voted 13-6 for the bill. On April 29, SustiNet received a favorable report from a third committee, the Labor and Public Employees Committee, which voted 8-3 for the bill. On May 7, 2009, Sustinet received a favorable report from a fourth committee, the Insurance and Real Estate Committee, which voted 13-4 for the bill.

On May 20, 2009, the Connecticut House of Representatives voted 107-35 for SustiNet. On May 30, 2009, the Connecticut Senate voted 23-12 for SustiNet. SustiNet was sent to Governor Jodi Rell, who vetoed it on July 8. On July 20, 2009, the governor's vetoes were overridden by the Connecticut House of Representatives with a vote of 102 to 40 and then by the Connecticut Senate with a vote of 24–12.

The work of the nine member SustiNet board began in July 2009 and in September two more positions were added to the board. The 11 member board guides four committees and three task forces, which will report to the General Assembly in July 2010. Enrollment in the program will begin in July 2012.

With the March 23, 2010 signing of a national health care bill, the SustiNet board had until May 2010 to report to the General Assembly regarding how to implement the federal law in Connecticut. That report was released by the SustiNet Board of Directors on May 27, 2010. The report "plots a course for our future conversations and acknowledges the federal interaction in a solid way," said board co-chair Kevin Lembo, the current state comptroller and former state health care advocate.

== See also ==
- Connecticut
- Health care reform in the United States
- Universal Health Care Foundation of Connecticut
