= Universal Health Care Foundation of Connecticut =

American nonprofit organization

- Type: Nonprofit
- Headquarters: Middletown, Connecticut, United States
- Chair: Laura McCargar
- Revenue: US$1.47 million (2016)
- Expenses: US$1.3 million (2016)
- Website: www.universalhealthct.org

Universal Health Care Foundation of Connecticut is an independent, nonprofit organization The foundation supports the mission of its parent organization, CHART (Connecticut Health Advancement and Research Trust). As of 2008, the foundation had assets of approximately $30 million.

== History ==
In 1997, Attorney General Richard Blumenthal, Comptroller Nancy Wyman and a coalition of advocacy and labor organizations sued the for-profit Anthem Insurance Co. over its merger with the non-profit Blue Cross & Blue Shield of Connecticut. The aim was to recover tax benefits and other concessions that the former Blue Cross & Blue Shield of Connecticut had received. The lawsuit was dropped after Anthem Insurance agreed to a settlement in 1999. As a result, the state established the Connecticut Health Advancement and Research Trust.

It is one of about 165 foundations nationwide to be created by conversions of nonprofit health corporations to for-profit entities. As a condition of these conversions, the law requires that the assets of the nonprofit be retained for some public purpose. The foundation received $41 million to carry out the conditions of the settlement. It was charged with working toward system-wide health care reform.

The foundation was incorporated in 2000. It opened its first offices in New Haven, Connecticut. In January 2003, Juan Figueroa, a former Connecticut legislator, became foundation president. In 2004, the foundation changed its name to reflect a final separation from the Anthem Blue Cross and Blue Shield of Connecticut. At the time, Figueroa stated that no relationship with Anthem existed.

Since 2004, the foundation has awarded over $7 million in grants to organizations. In 2007, the Hartford Business Journal chose Juan Figueroa as a 2007 "Health Care Hero". Frances G. Padilla was appointed as the foundation president in 2012.

== SustiNet ==
In January 2009, the foundation announced SustiNet, a proposal for a statewide health care plan for Connecticut that would provide residents with their choice of health coverage and care regardless of their employment status, age, or pre-existing conditions.

In the General Assembly's joint committees on March 26, the Public Health Committee voted 22–8 in favor. On May 20, 2009, the House of Representatives voted 107–35 for SustiNet, and on May 30, the Senate voted 23–12. SustiNet was sent to Governor M. Jodi Rell, who vetoed it on July 8. On July 20, the governor's vetoes were overridden by the Connecticut House of Representatives with a vote of 102–40 and then by the Connecticut Senate with a vote of 24–12.
