= 1978 Maryland Senate election =

- November 7, 1978

All 47 seats in the Maryland Senate 24 seats needed for a majority
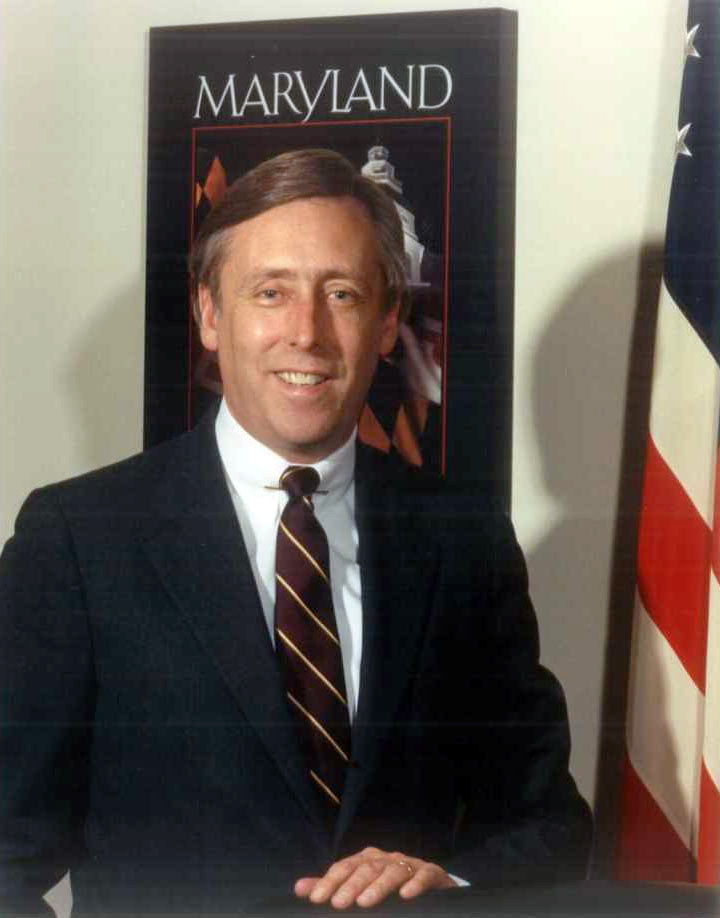

	Majority party	Minority party
Leader	Steny Hoyer (retired)	Edward J. Mason
Party	Democratic	Republican
Leader since	January 3, 1975	January 1975
Leader's seat	District 26	District 1
Last election	39	8
Seats after	40	7
Seat change	▲1	▼1
Popular vote	601,857	197,097
Percentage	74.94%	24.54%
President before election
Steny Hoyer
Democratic
Elected President
James Clark Jr.
Democratic

The 1978 Maryland Senate election was held on November 7, 1978, to determine which party would control the Maryland Senate for the following four years. All 47 seats were up for election and the primary was held on September 12, 1978. Prior to the election, 39 seats were held by Democrats and 8 seats were held by Republicans. The general election saw the Democrats expand their majority by a single seat.

== Retirements ==
=== Democrats ===
1. District 7: Donald P. Hutchinson retired to run for Baltimore County Executive.
2. District 8: Roy N. Staten retired.
3. District 13: John C. Coolahan retired.
4. District 17: Charles W. Gilchrist retired to run for Montgomery County Executive.
5. District 22: Meyer M. Emanuel Jr. retired.
6. District 26: Steny Hoyer retired to run for lieutenant governor of Maryland alongside Blair Lee III.
7. District 32: Alfred J. Lipin retired.
8. District 34: Elroy G. Boyer retired.

=== Republicans ===
1. District 5: C. A. Porter Hopkins retired.
2. District 16: Newton I. Steers Jr. retired.

== Incumbents defeated ==
=== In primary ===
==== Democrats ====
1. District 19: C. Lawrence Wiser lost renomination to Sidney Kramer.
2. District 36: E. Homer White Jr. lost renomination to Joseph J. Long Sr.

== Closest races ==
Seats where the margin of victory was under 10%:

1. District 16, 0.78%
2. District 30, 3.22%
3. District 5, 9.48% (gain)

== Results ==
=== District 1 ===
District 1 election, 1978
Party	Candidate	Votes	%
Republican	Edward J. Mason (incumbent)	13,981	55.27%
Democratic	Philip T. Carolan	11,313	44.73%
Total votes		25,294	100.0%
Republican hold			

=== District 2 ===
District 2 election, 1978
Party	Candidate	Votes	%
Democratic	Victor Cushwa (incumbent)	15,338	100.0%
Total votes		15,338	100.0%
Democratic hold			

=== District 3 ===
District 3 election, 1978
Party	Candidate	Votes	%
Republican	Edward P. Thomas Jr. (incumbent)	11,281	100.0%
Total votes		11,281	100.0%
Republican hold			

=== District 4 ===
District 4 election, 1978
Party	Candidate	Votes	%
Democratic	Charles H. Smelser (incumbent)	16,453	100.0%
Total votes		16,453	100.0%
Democratic hold			

=== District 5 ===
District 5 election, 1978
Party	Candidate	Votes	%
Democratic	Francis X. Kelly	16,256	54.74%
Republican	George A. Price	13,439	45.26%
Total votes		29,695	100.0%
Democratic gain from Republican			

=== District 6 ===
District 6 election, 1978
Party	Candidate	Votes	%
Democratic	Arthur Henry Helton Jr. (incumbent)	15,152	100.0%
Total votes		15,152	100.0%
Democratic hold			

=== District 7 ===
District 7 election, 1978
Party	Candidate	Votes	%
Democratic	Dennis F. Rasmussen	16,446	76.72%
Republican	Leonard A. Kraus	4,991	23.28%
Total votes		21,437	100.0%
Democratic hold			

=== District 8 ===
District 8 election, 1978
Party	Candidate	Votes	%
Democratic	Patrick T. Welsh	15,295	87.35%
Republican	Bob H. Estes	2,214	12.65%
Total votes		17,509	100.0%
Democratic hold			

=== District 9 ===
District 9 election, 1978
Party	Candidate	Votes	%
Democratic	Norman R. Stone Jr. (incumbent)	17,445	100.0%
Total votes		17,445	100.0%
Democratic hold			

=== District 10 ===
District 10 election, 1978
Party	Candidate	Votes	%
Republican	John J. Bishop Jr. (incumbent)	15,205	60.98%
Democratic	David J. Preller	9,729	39.02%
Total votes		24,934	100.0%
Republican hold			

=== District 11 ===
District 11 election, 1978
Party	Candidate	Votes	%
Republican	Robert E. Stroble (incumbent)	14,112	61.24%
Democratic	Roy E. Estes	8,931	38.76%
Total votes		23,043	100.0%
Republican hold			

=== District 12 ===
District 12 election, 1978
Party	Candidate	Votes	%
Democratic	Melvin Steinberg (incumbent)	22,223	82.01%
Republican	Harvey T. Galonoy	4,874	17.99%
Total votes		27,097	100.0%
Democratic hold			

=== District 13 ===
District 13 election, 1978
Party	Candidate	Votes	%
Democratic	Timothy R. Hickman	15,803	100.0%
Total votes		15,803	100.0%
Democratic hold			

=== District 14 ===
District 14 election, 1978
Party	Candidate	Votes	%
Democratic	James Clark Jr. (incumbent)	28,909	100.0%
Total votes		28,909	100.0%
Democratic hold			

=== District 15 ===
District 15 election, 1978
Party	Candidate	Votes	%
Democratic	Laurence Levitan (incumbent)	16,507	48.00%
Republican	John Henry Hiser Jr.	13,693	39.81%
Independent	Bette Marshall	4,194	12.19%
Total votes		34,394	100.0%
Democratic hold			

=== District 16 ===
District 16 election, 1978
Party	Candidate	Votes	%
Republican	Howard A. Denis	13,558	50.39%
Democratic	Joseph D. Gebhardt	13,347	49.61%
Total votes		26,905	100.0%
Republican hold			

=== District 17 ===
District 17 election, 1978
Party	Candidate	Votes	%
Democratic	S. Frank Shore	12,113	56.48%
Republican	Albert E. Nunn	9,335	43.52%
Total votes		21,448	100.0%
Democratic hold			

=== District 18 ===
District 18 election, 1978
Party	Candidate	Votes	%
Democratic	Margaret Schweinhaut (incumbent)	16,359	71.94%
Republican	Donald H. Dalton	6,382	28.06%
Total votes		22,741	100.0%
Democratic hold			

=== District 19 ===
District 19 election, 1978
Party	Candidate	Votes	%
Democratic	Sidney Kramer	17,332	100.0%
Total votes		17,332	100.0%
Democratic hold			

=== District 20 ===
District 20 election, 1978
Party	Candidate	Votes	%
Democratic	Victor L. Crawford (incumbent)	11,638	100.0%
Total votes		11,638	100.0%
Democratic hold			

=== District 21 ===
District 21 election, 1978
Party	Candidate	Votes	%
Democratic	Arthur Dorman (incumbent)	10,315	61.45%
Republican	Julia Brown	6,470	38.55%
Total votes		16,785	100.0%
Democratic hold			

=== District 22 ===
District 22 election, 1978
Party	Candidate	Votes	%
Democratic	John J. Garrity	9,938	100.0%
Total votes		9,938	100.0%
Democratic hold			

=== District 23 ===
District 23 election, 1978
Party	Candidate	Votes	%
Democratic	Thomas Patrick O'Reilly (incumbent)	9,192	70.08%
Republican	Richard Anthony Blancato	3,924	29.92%
Total votes		13,116	100.0%
Democratic hold			

=== District 24 ===
District 24 election, 1978
Party	Candidate	Votes	%
Democratic	Edward T. Conroy (incumbent)	15,072	100.0%
Total votes		15,072	100.0%
Democratic hold			

=== District 25 ===
District 25 election, 1978
Party	Candidate	Votes	%
Democratic	Tommie Broadwater (incumbent)	5,542	62.07%
Republican	Joseph M. Parker	3,386	37.93%
Total votes		8,928	100.0%
Democratic hold			

=== District 26 ===
District 26 election, 1978
Party	Candidate	Votes	%
Democratic	B. W. Mike Donovan	7,362	100.0%
Total votes		7,362	100.0%
Democratic hold			

=== District 27 ===
District 27 election, 1978
Party	Candidate	Votes	%
Democratic	Peter A. Bozick (incumbent)	9,150	100.0%
Total votes		9,150	100.0%
Democratic hold			

=== District 28 ===
District 28 election, 1978
Party	Candidate	Votes	%
Democratic	Thomas V. Miller Jr. (incumbent)	11,846	72.44%
Republican	Ray Velasquez	4,506	27.56%
Total votes		16,352	100.0%
Democratic hold			

=== District 29 ===
District 29 election, 1978
Party	Candidate	Votes	%
Democratic	James C. Simpson (incumbent)	15,433	100.0%
Total votes		15,433	100.0%
Democratic hold			

=== District 30 ===
District 30 election, 1978
Party	Candidate	Votes	%
Republican	Edward T. Hall (incumbent)	11,639	51.61%
Democratic	George M. Nutwell	10,913	48.39%
Total votes		22,552	100.0%
Republican hold			

=== District 31 ===
District 31 election, 1978
Party	Candidate	Votes	%
Democratic	Jerome F. Connell Sr. (incumbent)	11,413	56.64%
Republican	Gary Q. Green	8,737	43.36%
Total votes		20,150	100.0%
Democratic hold			

=== District 32 ===
District 32 election, 1978
Party	Candidate	Votes	%
Democratic	H. Erle Schafer	12,332	67.75%
Republican	Richard L. Stack	5,871	32.25%
Total votes		18,203	100.0%
Democratic hold			

=== District 33 ===
District 33 election, 1978
Party	Candidate	Votes	%
Republican	John A. Cade (incumbent)	14,179	65.73%
Democratic	Darrell L. Henry	7,392	34.27%
Total votes		21,571	100.0%
Republican hold			

=== District 34 ===
District 34 election, 1978
Party	Candidate	Votes	%
Democratic	Walter M. Baker	12,519	57.24%
Republican	Peter K. Monk	9,352	42.76%
Total votes		21,871	100.0%
Democratic hold			

=== District 35 ===
District 35 election, 1978
Party	Candidate	Votes	%
Democratic	Frederick Malkus (incumbent)	15,209	100.0%
Total votes		15,209	100.0%
Democratic hold			

=== District 36 ===
District 36 election, 1978
Party	Candidate	Votes	%
Democratic	Joseph J. Long Sr.	17,952	75.05%
Republican	Noah Ames Pennewell	5,968	24.95%
Total votes		23,920	100.0%
Democratic hold			

=== District 37 ===
District 37 election, 1978
Party	Candidate	Votes	%
Democratic	Harry J. McGuirk (incumbent)	7,930	100.0%
Total votes		7,930	100.0%
Democratic hold			

=== District 38 ===
District 38 election, 1978
Party	Candidate	Votes	%
Democratic	Clarence Mitchell III (incumbent)	7,150	100.0%
Total votes		7,150	100.0%
Democratic hold			

=== District 39 ===
District 39 election, 1978
Party	Candidate	Votes	%
Democratic	Julian L. Lapides (incumbent)	10,625	100.0%
Total votes		10,625	100.0%
Democratic hold			

=== District 40 ===
District 40 election, 1978
Party	Candidate	Votes	%
Democratic	Verda Welcome (incumbent)	9,389	100.0%
Total votes		9,389	100.0%
Democratic hold			

=== District 41 ===
District 41 election, 1978
Party	Candidate	Votes	%
Democratic	Clarence W. Blount (incumbent)	9,849	100.0%
Total votes		9,849	100.0%
Democratic hold			

=== District 42 ===
District 42 election, 1978
Party	Candidate	Votes	%
Democratic	Rosalie Silber Abrams (incumbent)	16,617	100.0%
Total votes		16,617	100.0%
Democratic hold			

=== District 43 ===
District 43 election, 1978
Party	Candidate	Votes	%
Democratic	J. Joseph Curran Jr. (incumbent)	15,431	100.0%
Total votes		15,431	100.0%
Democratic hold			

=== District 44 ===
District 44 election, 1978
Party	Candidate	Votes	%
Democratic	John Carroll Byrnes (incumbent)	14,898	100.0%
Total votes		14,898	100.0%
Democratic hold			

=== District 45 ===
District 45 election, 1978
Party	Candidate	Votes	%
Democratic	Robert Douglass (incumbent)	6,893	100.0%
Total votes		6,893	100.0%
Democratic hold			

=== District 46 ===
District 46 election, 1978
Party	Candidate	Votes	%
Democratic	Joseph S. Bonvegna (incumbent)	13,034	100.0%
Total votes		13,034	100.0%
Democratic hold			

=== District 47 ===
District 47 election, 1978
Party	Candidate	Votes	%
Democratic	Cornell N. Dypski (incumbent)	11,872	100.0%
Total votes		11,872	100.0%
Democratic hold			
