= 2022 United States Senate election in Maryland =

- November 8, 2022
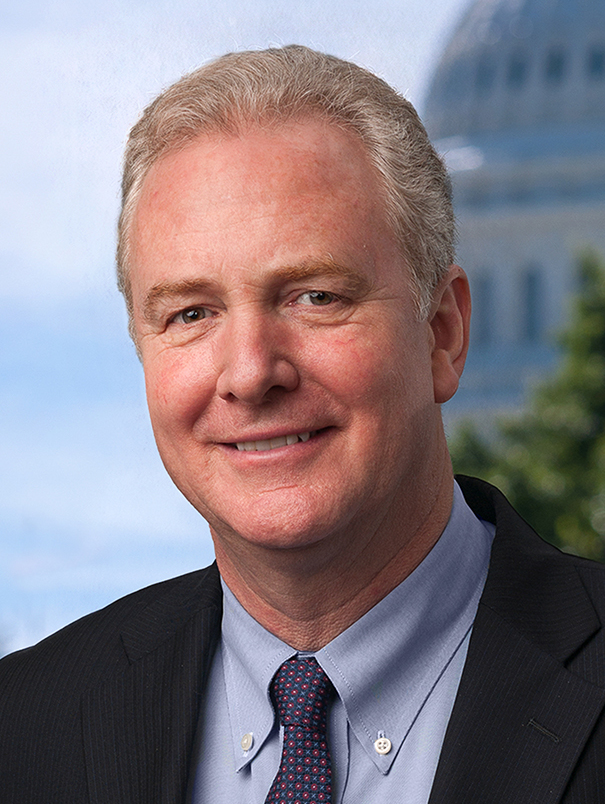

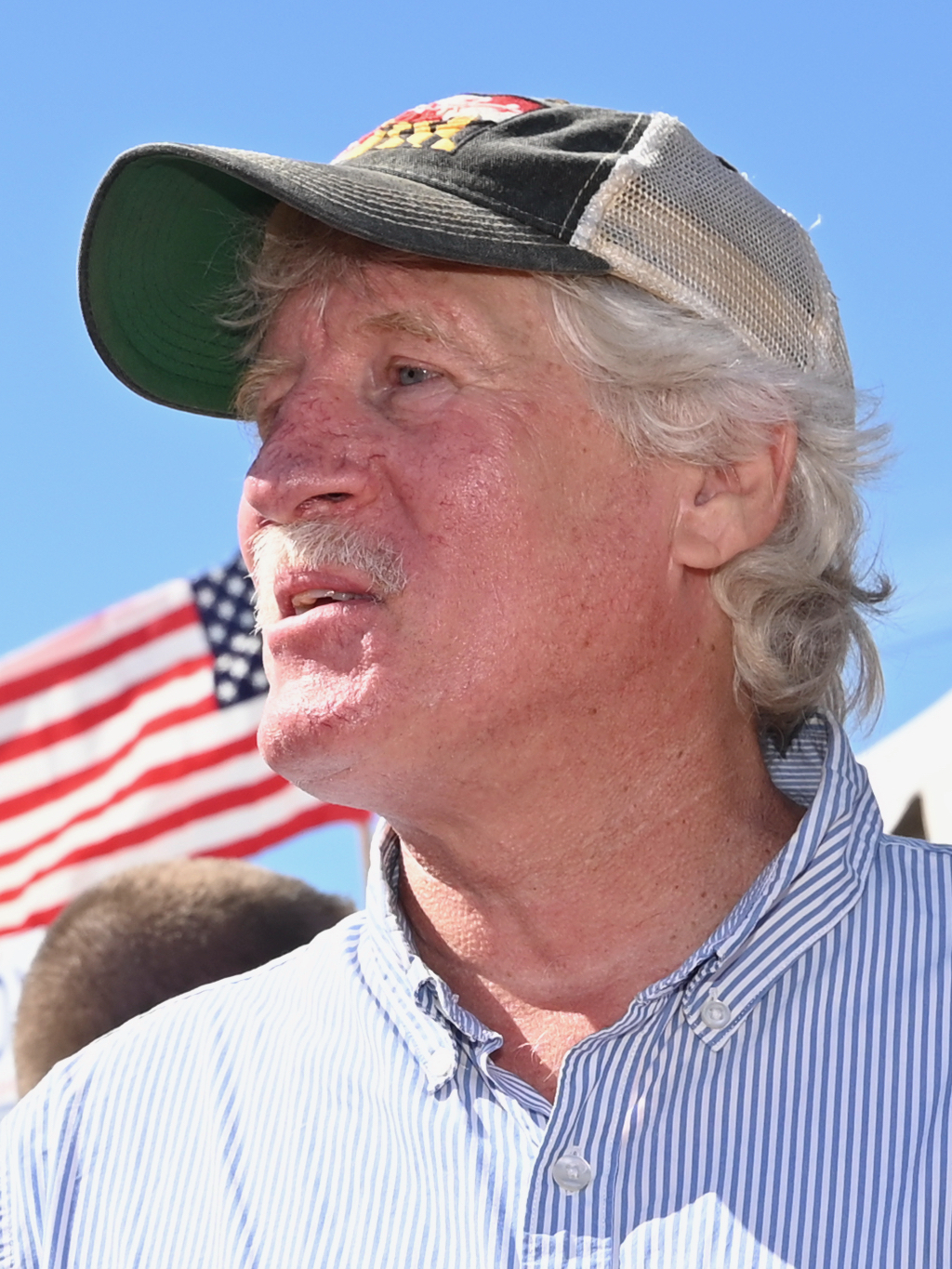
Nominee	Chris Van Hollen	Chris Chaffee
Party	Democratic	Republican
Popular vote	1,316,897	682,293
Percentage	65.77%	34.07%
- Van Hollen: 50–60% 60–70% 70–80% 80–90% >90% Chaffee: 40–50% 50–60% 60–70% 70–80% 80–90% >90% Tie: 40–50% 50% No votes
U.S. senator before election
Chris Van Hollen
Democratic
Elected U.S. senator
Chris Van Hollen
Democratic

The 2022 United States Senate election in Maryland was held on November 8, 2022, to elect a member of the United States Senate to represent Maryland. The Democratic and Republican primaries were held on July 19, 2022.

Incumbent Democratic Senator Chris Van Hollen was first elected in 2016 with 60.9% of the vote, winning the seat of retiring incumbent Barbara Mikulski. He ran for a second term against Chris Chaffee, the Republican nominee.

Shortly after polls closed on November 8, 2022, the Associated Press called the race for Van Hollen. He overperformed his 2016 numbers and flipped four counties that he lost in his first election: Anne Arundel (home to the state capital Annapolis), Frederick, Kent, and Talbot.

== Democratic primary ==
=== Candidates ===
==== Nominee ====
- Chris Van Hollen, incumbent U.S. senator

==== Eliminated in primary ====
- Michelle Laurence Smith, federal employee and business owner

=== Endorsements ===
Chris Van Hollen

Labor unions

- American Federation of State, County and Municipal Employees Local 3
- American Federation of State, County and Municipal Employees Local 67
- American Federation of Teachers Maryland
- Maryland State and District of Columbia AFL–CIO
- National Education Association
- Service Employees International Union Local 500
- UNITE HERE Local 25
- United Food and Commercial Workers Local 400

Organizations

- Bend the Arc Jewish Action PAC
- Brady PAC
- Chesapeake Climate Action Network
- Council for a Livable World
- End Citizens United
- Feminist Majority PAC
- Giffords
- Human Rights Campaign
- Humane Society of the United States Legislative Fund
- J Street
- Jewish Democratic Council of America
- Let America Vote
- Maryland Realtors Political Action Committee
- NARAL Pro-Choice America
- National Organization for Women PAC
- Natural Resources Defense Council
- Planned Parenthood Action Fund
- Population Connection Action Fund
- Progressive Turnout Project
- Sierra Club

=== Results ===
Results by county: Van Hollen: 60–70%; 70–80%; 80–90%

Democratic primary results
Party	Candidate	Votes	%
Democratic	Chris Van Hollen (incumbent)	535,014	80.81%
Democratic	Michelle Laurence Smith	127,089	19.19%
Total votes		662,103	100.0%

== Republican primary ==
=== Candidates ===
==== Nominee ====
- Chris Chaffee, homebuilding contractor and perennial candidate (Note: Candidate for Maryland's 5th congressional district in 2010 and nominee in 2014; candidate for U.S. Senate in 2016 and 2018)

==== Eliminated in primary ====
- George Davis, engineer
- Nnabu Eze, IT contractor and perennial candidate (Note: Candidate for U.S. Senate in 2018 and for Maryland's 4th congressional district in 2020; Green nominee for Maryland's 3rd congressional district in 2016)
- Lorie Friend, nurse
- Reba Hawkins, business owner and candidate for Maryland's 3rd congressional district in 2020
- Jon McGreevey, a.k.a. Ryan Dark White, adult bookstore employee and believer in the QAnon conspiracy theory
- Joseph Perez, IT project manager
- Todd Puglisi, grocery store clerk
- James Tarantin, entrepreneur
- John Thormann, contractual consultant

==== Declined ====
- Andy Harris, U.S. representative for Maryland's 1st congressional district (2011–present) (ran for re-election)
- Larry Hogan, governor of Maryland (2015–2023)

=== Endorsements ===
Chris Chaffee

Organizations

- Maryland Right to Life (co-endorsement with Eze, Hawkins, and Perez)
Nnabu Eze

Organizations

- Maryland Right to Life (co-endorsement with Chaffee, Hawkins, and Perez)
Lorie Friend

State legislators

- Wendell R. Beitzel, state delegate for District 1A (2007–2023)
- George C. Edwards, state senator for the 1st District (2007–2023)
- Mike McKay, state delegate for District 1C (2015–2023)
Reba Hawkins

Organizations

- Maryland Right to Life (co-endorsement with Chaffee, Eze, and Perez)
Joseph Perez

Organizations

- Maryland Right to Life (co-endorsement with Chaffee, Hawkins, and Eze)
James Tarantin

State legislators

- Trent Kittleman, state delegate for district 9A (2015–2023)

=== Results ===
Results by county: Chaffee: 10–20%; 20–30%; 30–40%; 40–50%; Friend: 10–20%; 20–30%; 30–40%; Thormann: 10–20%; Tarantin: 20–30%

Republican primary results
Party	Candidate	Votes	%
Republican	Chris Chaffee	50,514	20.78%
Republican	Lorie Friend	35,714	14.69%
Republican	John Thormann	33,290	13.69%
Republican	Joseph Perez	26,359	10.84%
Republican	George Davis	21,095	8.68%
Republican	James Tarantin	20,514	8.44%
Republican	Reba Hawkins	18,057	7.43%
Republican	Jon McGreevey	14,128	5.81%
Republican	Todd Puglisi	13,550	5.57%
Republican	Nnabu Eze	9,917	4.08%
Total votes		243,138	100.0%

== Other candidates ==
=== Write-in ===
==== Declared ====
- Scottie Griffin (Democratic)
- Andrew Wildman (unaffiliated)

== General election ==
=== Predictions ===
Source	Ranking	As of
The Cook Political Report	Solid D	March 4, 2022
Inside Elections	Solid D	July 1, 2022
Sabato's Crystal Ball	Safe D	June 15, 2022
Politico	Solid D	April 1, 2022
RCP	Safe D	January 10, 2022
Fox News	Solid D	May 12, 2022
DDHQ	Solid D	July 20, 2022
538	Solid D	June 30, 2022
The Economist	Safe D	September 7, 2022

=== Post-primary endorsements ===
Chris Van Hollen (D)

Executive branch officials

- Joe Biden, 46th president of the United States (2021–2025), 47th vice president of the United States (2009–2017), and former U.S. senator from Delaware (1973–2009)

Labor unions

- International Brotherhood of Electrical Workers Local 26
- United Auto Workers

Organizations

- Everytown for Gun Safety
- League of Conservation Voters

Newspapers

- Baltimore Afro-American
- The Washington Post

=== Polling ===
Poll source	Date(s) administered	Sample size (Note: Key: A – all adults RV – registered voters LV – likely voters V – unclear)	Margin of error	Chris Van Hollen (D)	Chris Chaffee (R)	Other	Undecided
Goucher College	September 8–12, 2022	748 (LV)	± 3.6%	56%	33%	2% (Note: "Some other candidate" (volunteered response) with 2%)	8%

Hypothetical polling

Chris Van Hollen vs. Larry Hogan

Poll source	Date(s) administered	Sample size	Margin of error	Chris Van Hollen (D)	Larry Hogan (R)	Other	Undecided
WPA Intelligence (R) (Note: This poll was paid for by the Senate Leadership Fund.)	November 29 – December 1, 2021	500 (LV)	± 4.4%	37%	49%	–	14%
Change Research (D)	September 29 – October 1, 2020	650 (V)	± 4.6%	50%	34%	–	16%
University of Maryland/Washington Post	October 9–14, 2019	819 (RV)	± 4.5%	42%	50%	3% (Note: "Neither" with 2%; would not vote with 1%; "Other" with 0%)	5%

=== Results ===
2022 United States Senate election in Maryland
Party	Candidate	Votes	%	±%
Democratic	Chris Van Hollen (incumbent)	1,316,897	65.77%	+4.88%
Republican	Chris Chaffee	682,293	34.07%	−1.60%
Write-in		3,146	0.16%	+0.02%
Total votes		2,002,336	100.0%	
Democratic hold				

==== By county ====
By county

County	Chris Van Hollen Democratic		Chris Chaffee Republican		Write-in		Margin		Total votes
County	#	%	#	%	#	%	#	%	Total votes
Allegany	7,244	33.56	14,326	66.36	17	0.08	-7,082	-32.81	21,587
Anne Arundel	123,696	57.39	91,471	42.44	377	0.17	32,225	14.95	215,544
Baltimore	175,417	64.23	97,307	35.63	402	0.15	78,110	28.60	273,126
Baltimore City	129,257	90.15	13,849	9.66	280	0.19	115,408	80.49	143,386
Calvert	17,007	45.44	20,382	54.46	37	0.10	-3,375	-9.02	37,426
Caroline	3,586	33.65	7,054	66.20	16	0.15	-3,468	-32.55	10,656
Carroll	27,775	38.78	43,761	61.10	90	0.13	-15,986	-22.32	71,626
Cecil	12,132	36.86	20,725	62.97	56	0.17	-8,593	-26.11	32,913
Charles	38,270	70.12	16,207	29.70	97	0.18	22,063	40.43	54,574
Dorchester	4,947	43.12	6,511	56.75	15	0.13	-1,564	-13.63	11,473
Frederick	58,708	55.26	47,406	44.62	119	0.11	11,302	10.64	106,233
Garrett	2,608	23.16	8,647	76.78	7	0.06	-6,039	-53.62	11,262
Harford	45,273	43.90	57,713	55.96	150	0.14	-12,440	-12.06	103,136
Howard	92,205	70.90	37,617	28.92	230	0.18	54,588	41.97	130,052
Kent	4,461	52.95	3,950	46.88	14	0.17	511	6.07	8,425
Montgomery	276,482	80.59	65,956	19.23	634	0.18	210,526	61.36	343,072
Prince George's	218,726	91.04	21,127	8.79	398	0.17	197,599	82.25	240,251
Queen Anne's	8,710	38.19	14,064	61.67	31	0.14	-5,354	-23.48	22,805
Somerset	2,656	39.02	4,146	60.91	5	0.07	-1,490	-21.89	6,807
St. Mary's	15,656	41.67	21,869	58.21	43	0.11	-6,213	-16.54	37,568
Talbot	9,028	51.33	8,548	48.60	13	0.07	480	2.73	17,589
Washington	19,420	40.00	29,072	59.87	64	0.13	-9,652	-19.88	48,556
Wicomico	14,296	46.98	16,104	52.92	32	0.10	-1,808	-5.94	30,432
Worcester	9,337	39.17	14,481	60.75	19	0.08	-5,144	-21.58	23,837
Totals	1,316,897	65.77	682,293	34.07	3,146	0.16	634,604	31.69	2,002,336

Counties that flipped from Republican to Democratic

- Anne Arundel (largest municipality: Glen Burnie)
- Frederick (largest municipality: Frederick)
- Kent (largest municipality: Chestertown)
- Talbot (largest municipality: Easton)

==== By congressional district ====
Van Hollen won seven of eight congressional districts.

District	Van Hollen	Chaffee	Representative
1st	42.7%	57.2%	Andy Harris
2nd	60.8%	39.1%	Dutch Ruppersberger
3rd	62.3%	37.5%	John Sarbanes
4th	91.0%	8.9%	Anthony Brown (117th Congress)
4th	91.0%	8.9%	Glenn Ivey (118th Congress)
5th	67.1%	32.8%	Steny Hoyer
6th	54.4%	45.5%	David Trone
7th	83.4%	16.4%	Kweisi Mfume
8th	81.9%	17.9%	Jamie Raskin

== Notes ==
Partisan clients

== See also ==
- Elections in Maryland
- 2022 United States elections
- 2022 Maryland gubernatorial election
- 2022 Maryland Attorney General election
- 2022 Maryland Senate elections
- 2022 Maryland Comptroller election
- 2022 United States House of Representatives elections in Maryland
- 2022 United States gubernatorial elections
- 2022 Maryland House of Delegates election
