= List of Frostburg State University alumni =

This list includes notable graduates, non-graduate former students, and current students of Frostburg State University, a four-year state university located in Frostburg, Maryland that is part of the University System of Maryland.

== Academia and science ==
Name	Class	Degree(s)	Notability	Reference
Richard R. Arnold	1985		NASA astronaut, selected in 2004 as an educator mission specialist	

== Arts and entertainment ==
Name	Class	Degree(s)	Notability	Reference
Jack Blessing			Film and television actor, appeared on Moonlighting, George Lopez, The Naked Truth	
Gregory Thomas Garcia			Emmy-winning writer and producer of the television series Yes, Dear and My Name Is Earl	
Debra Monk			Actress, Tony and Emmy award winner, has appeared on NYPD Blue, Law & Order, Desperate Housewives, and Grey's Anatomy	
Kelly L. Moran			Artist	

== Government, politics, and law ==
Name	Class	Degree(s)	Notability	Reference
John N. Bambacus			Former member of the Maryland Senate, former mayor of Frostburg	
Joseph R. Bartlett			Republican member of the Maryland House of Delegates	
Wendell R. Beitzel			Republican member of the Maryland House of Delegates	
George C. Edwards			Republican member of the Maryland Senate	
Donald C. Fry			Former Democratic member of the Maryland House of Delegates and Maryland Senate	
Sue Hecht			Democratic member of the Maryland House of Delegates	
Henry B. Heller	1964		Democratic member of the Maryland House of Delegates	
Donald P. Hutchinson	1967		Baltimore County executive, 78–86; member of the Maryland House of Delegates, 67–74; and state senate, 75-78	
Kevin Kelly	1975		Democratic member of the Maryland House of Delegates	
Beverly D. Mackereth			Former Republican member of the Pennsylvania House of Representatives	
Robert A. McKee	1991		Former Republican member of the Maryland House of Delegates, arrested for possession of child pornography	
Carl Walker Metzgar			Republican member of the Pennsylvania House of Representatives	
Victor R. Ramirez			Democratic member of the Maryland House of Delegates	

== Literature and journalism ==
- Pat Hiban, author, real estate agent and podcaster
- Donnie Izzett, missing journalism student from 1995
- James Wolcott, journalist and cultural critic for Vanity Fair

== Military ==
- James A. Graham, captain in the Marine Corps and posthumous recipient of the Medal of Honor

== Sports ==
Name	Class	Degree(s)	Notability	Reference
Barry Davis	1989	Master of Education	College baseball coach, most notably for Rider	
John Ellinger			American soccer coach, formerly of the Under 17 United States men's national soccer team and Real Salt Lake of Major League Soccer	
Moise Fokou			Football linebacker for the Philadelphia Eagles	
Mike Longabardi	1996	Health and Physical Education	Basketball assistant coach for the Houston Rockets, Boston Celtics, Phoenix Suns, and Cleveland Cavaliers	
Bob Maddox	1973		Football defensive end for the Cincinnati Bengals and Kansas City Chiefs	
Niles Scott	2017		Football defensive tackle, formerly for the Cincinnati Bengals of the NFL, and currently for the DC Defenders of the XFL	
