= Staten =

Staten may refer to:

== People ==
- Randy Staten (1944–2020), American politician and football player
- Roy N. Staten (1913–1999), American politician

== Places ==
- Staten Island, a borough of New York City, New York, United States
- Staten, West Virginia, an unincorporated community, United States
- Staten Run, a stream in West Virginia, United States
