= Dypski =

Dypski is a surname. Notable people with the surname include:

- Cornell N. Dypski (1931–2009), American politician
- Raymond A. Dypski (1923–2004), American politician
