= DeCorsey E. Bolden =

American politician and businessman (1924–2016)

Member of the Maryland House of Delegates from the 1A district
- In office 1971–1982
- Preceded by: District established
- Succeeded by: George C. Edwards

Personal details
- Born: DeCorsey Emroy Bolden; November 27, 1924 Oakland, Maryland, U.S.
- Died: April 29, 2016 (aged 91) Oakland, Maryland, U.S.
- Resting place: Oakland Cemetery
- Party: Republican
- Spouse(s): Nancy Lou Dawson (m. 1950) Mary Phyllis Armentrout (divorced)
- Children: 3
- Education: University of Maryland
- Occupation: Politician; businessman

DeCorsey Emroy Bolden (November 27, 1924 – April 29, 2016) was an American politician and businessman from Maryland. He served as a member of the Maryland House of Delegates from 1971 to 1982.

== Early life ==
DeCorsey Emroy Bolden was born on November 27, 1924, in Oakland, Maryland, to Mary Harper (née May) and Emroy DeCorsey Bolden. He attended public schools in Oakland and graduated from Oakland High School in 1941. He attended the University of Maryland for two years. He completed a course in Columbia, South Carolina.

== Career ==
In January 1944, Bolden began training at the United States Navy pre-flight school in Athens, Georgia. He was commissioned as an ensign in Navy Air Force in December 1944. He served with the Navy during World War II and the Korean War. He was a pilot instructor for the Navy Air Force. He attained the rank of lieutenant. He worked as businessman and owned the Southern Laundromat, Southern Apartments, Southern Car Wash, Southern Sanitation Service, and Southern Office Supply.

Bolden was a Republican. He served in the Maryland House of Delegates, representing Garrett County and part of Allegany County in district 1A, from 1971 to 1982. He was chair of the Garrett County delegation and was a member of the House Appropriations Committee and a member of the subcommittee on education and human resources and the special joint committee on capital projects.

Bolden was a delegate to the 1980 and 1984 Republican National Conventions. He was a member of the Garrett County Republican Central Committee and the Garrett County Liquor Control Board. He was chair of the Deep Creek Lake Advisory and Review Committee from 1983 to 1986. He was a member from Garrett County in the Tri-County Council for Western Maryland from 1987 to 1988. He was also a member and vice president of the Oakland Volunteer Fire Department. He was a member of the Knights of Pythias and the Woodmen of the World. He was a member of the American Legion and served as commander of Procter-Kildow Post 71. He was member and served as president of The Garrett County Historical Society.

== Personal life ==
Bolden married Nancy Lou Dawson, daughter of Ursula (née McIntire) and Harold Dawson, of Chevy Chase on July 15, 1950. They had two children, Emory "Skip" DeCorsey and Jeffries Dawson. He married Mary Phyllis Armentrout, daughter of Mary Margaret (née Auvil) and John Harrison Armentrout, of Oakland. They had one daughter, Mary DeCorsey. They later divorced. He was a member of St. Mark's Lutheran Church. In 1958, he lived in Bethesda. He was in a car accident in October 1958. He later lived on High Street in Oakland.

Bolden died on April 29, 2016, at his home in Oakland. He was buried in Oakland Cemetery.

== Awards ==
Bolden was inducted into the Maryland Senior Citizen Hall of Fame in 2015.
