= Southern Garrett High School =

High school in Oakland, Maryland

Location
- 345 Oakland Drive; Oakland, Garrett, MD 21550–3216; United States
- Coordinates: 39°24′15″N 79°23′24″W

Information
- Type: Public secondary
- Established: 1950
- Status: Currently operational
- School district: Garrett County Public Schools
- NCES District ID: 2400360
- Superintendent: Brenda E. McCartney
- School code: MD-11-113709
- CEEB code: 210785
- NCES School ID: 240036000674
- Principal: Ryan Wolf
- Faculty: 49.40 (on an FTE basis)
- Grades: 7-12
- Enrollment: 578 (2023-2024)
  - Grade 7: 3
  - Grade 8: 1
  - Grade 9: 145
  - Grade 10: 143
  - Grade 11: 145
  - Grade 12: 141
- Student to teacher ratio: 11.70:1
- Campus type: Town, Distant
- Colors: Red and White
- Athletics conference: MPSSAA
- Nickname: Rams
- Rival: Northern Garrett High School
- USNWR ranking: 8,805
- Newspaper: The Acorn
- Yearbook: The Highlander
- Feeder schools: Southern Middle School
- Website: gcps.net/southern-garrett-high

Southern Garrett High School is a public high school in Oakland, Maryland, United States, with 578 students. The school mascot is a Ram, and the school colors are red and white. Established in 1950, the school was originally built as a junior-senior high school (grades 7-12). The layout of the school features three wings, a greenhouse, and an extensive array of workshops.
