= Garrett County Public Schools =

School district in Maryland, United States

Address
- 770 Dennett Road Oakland, Garrett, Maryland, 21550; United States

District information
- Type: Public
- Grades: PK-12
- Superintendent: Brenda E. McCartney
- School board: 7
- Chair of the board: M. Tom Woods
- Schools: 12
- Budget: $105,273,000
- District ID: MD-11

Students and staff
- Students: 3,455
- Teachers: 285.10 (on an FTE basis)
- Staff: 273.31 (on an FTE basis)
- Student–teacher ratio: 12.12:1

Other information
- Website: garrettcountyschools.org

Garrett County Public Schools is a U.S. school district headquartered in Oakland, Maryland. It serves Garrett County, Maryland.

== Schools ==
- High schools:
  - Northern Garrett High School
  - Southern Garrett High School
- K-8 schools:
  - Swan Meadow
- Middle schools:
  - Northern Middle School
- Elementary schools:
  - Accident Elementary School
  - Broad Ford Elementary School
  - Crellin Elementary School
  - Friendsville Elementary School
  - Grantsville Elementary School
  - Route 40 Elementary School
  - Yough Glades Elementary School
- Other facilities:
  - Hickory Environmental Education Center
