= Deni Taveras =

American politician (born 1972)

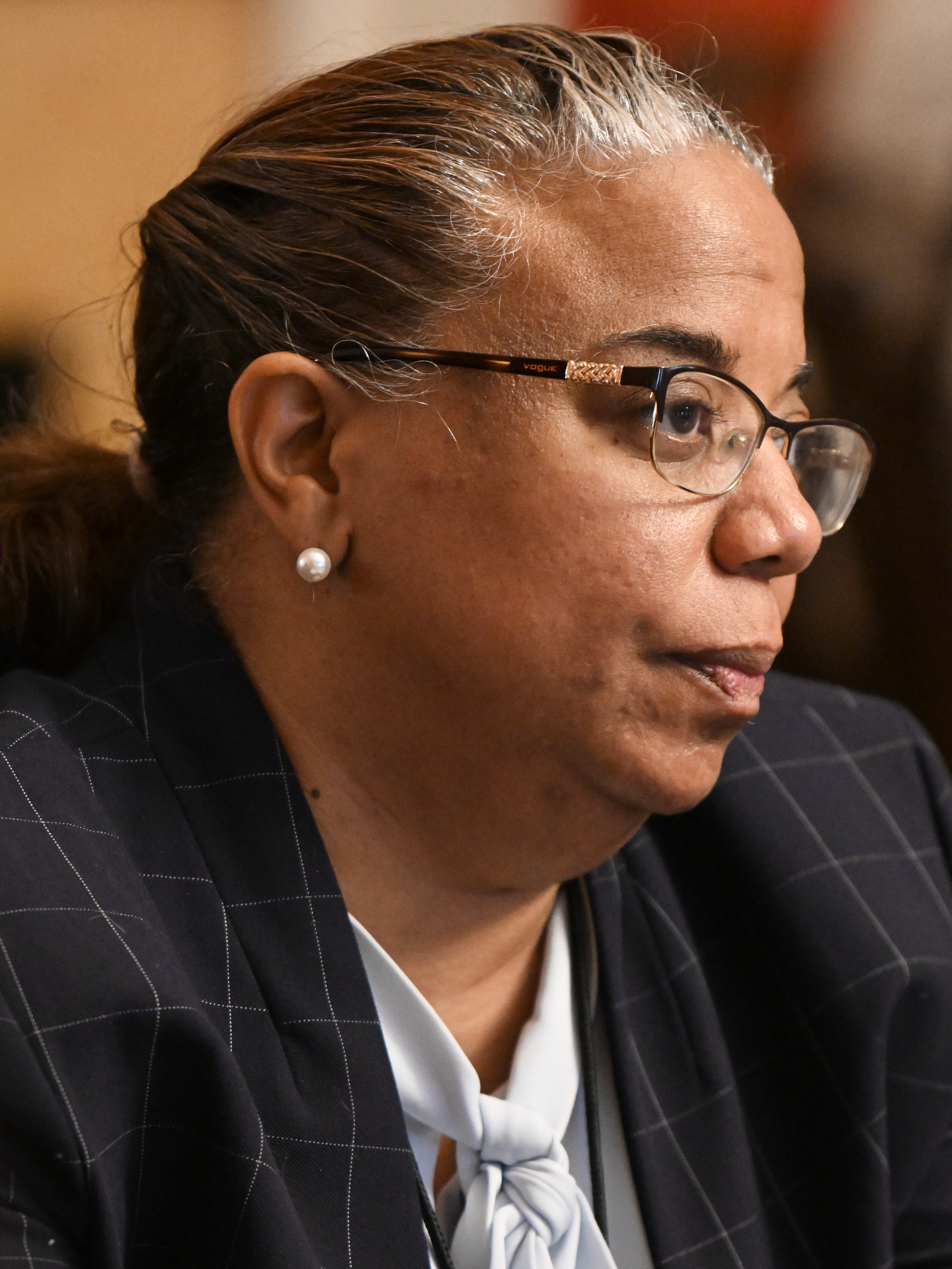
- Taveras in 2023

Member of the Maryland House of Delegates from the 47B district
- Incumbent
- Assumed office January 11, 2023
- Preceded by: Wanika B. Fisher

Member of the Prince George's County Council, District 2
- In office December 1, 2014 – December 5, 2022
- Preceded by: Will Campos
- Succeeded by: Wanika B. Fisher

Personal details
- Born: December 13, 1972 (age 53) New York City, New York, U.S.
- Party: Democratic
- Website: Campaign website

Deni Taveras (born December 13, 1972) is a Dominican American politician who is a member of the Maryland House of Delegates for District 47B in Prince George's County, Maryland. She was previously a member of the Prince George's County Council, representing District 2 from 2014 to 2022.

== Early life and education ==
Taveras was born in New York City in December 13, 1972. When Taveras was only four years old, her mother, Filomena Garcia, committed suicide. She moved between family members in New York and the Dominican Republic before settling with her father, Bienvenido Taveras. Taveras' father was killed while he was driving his taxi cab when she was eight years old. After this, she was placed under the care of her maternal grandmother in the neighborhood of Harlem.

Taveras attended Barnard College, where she earned a B.A. in chemistry in 1995, the University of Utah, where she earned a M.S. in chemistry in 1998, and the Woodrow Wilson School of Public and International Affairs at Princeton University, where she earned a M.P.A. degree in public affairs and urban regional planning in 2003.

Taveras moved to Maryland after receiving a job offer from the Dominican American National Roundtable in Washington, D.C. Taveras became unemployed when the Great Recession hit. At the same time, the condominium complex she lived in was going bankrupt, and Taveras assumed leadership of the condo association.

== Political involvement ==
After earning her master's degree, Taveras worked for the United States Environmental Protection Agency. Her concern for environmental issues prompted her to lead efforts to ban both fracking and styrofoam in her county. She became involved with Dominicans 2000, a group of Dominicans seeking to make community change through political action.

From 2011 to 2013, Taveras worked as the chief of staff for state senator Victor R. Ramirez.

Taveras made her first run for public office in 2014 for the Prince George's County Council in District 2, seeking to succeed councilmember Will Campos, who ran for the Maryland House of Delegates in District 47B. During her primary campaign, Taveras sought to win over Hispanic voters and received endorsements from Campos, County Executive Rushern Baker, and state delegate Joseline Peña-Melnyk. She won the Democratic primary in June 2014, edging out state delegate Doyle Niemann by six votes. After the ballots were counted, Neimann requested a recount but it did not change the vote difference. Taveras was unopposed in the general election.

=== Prince George's County Council ===
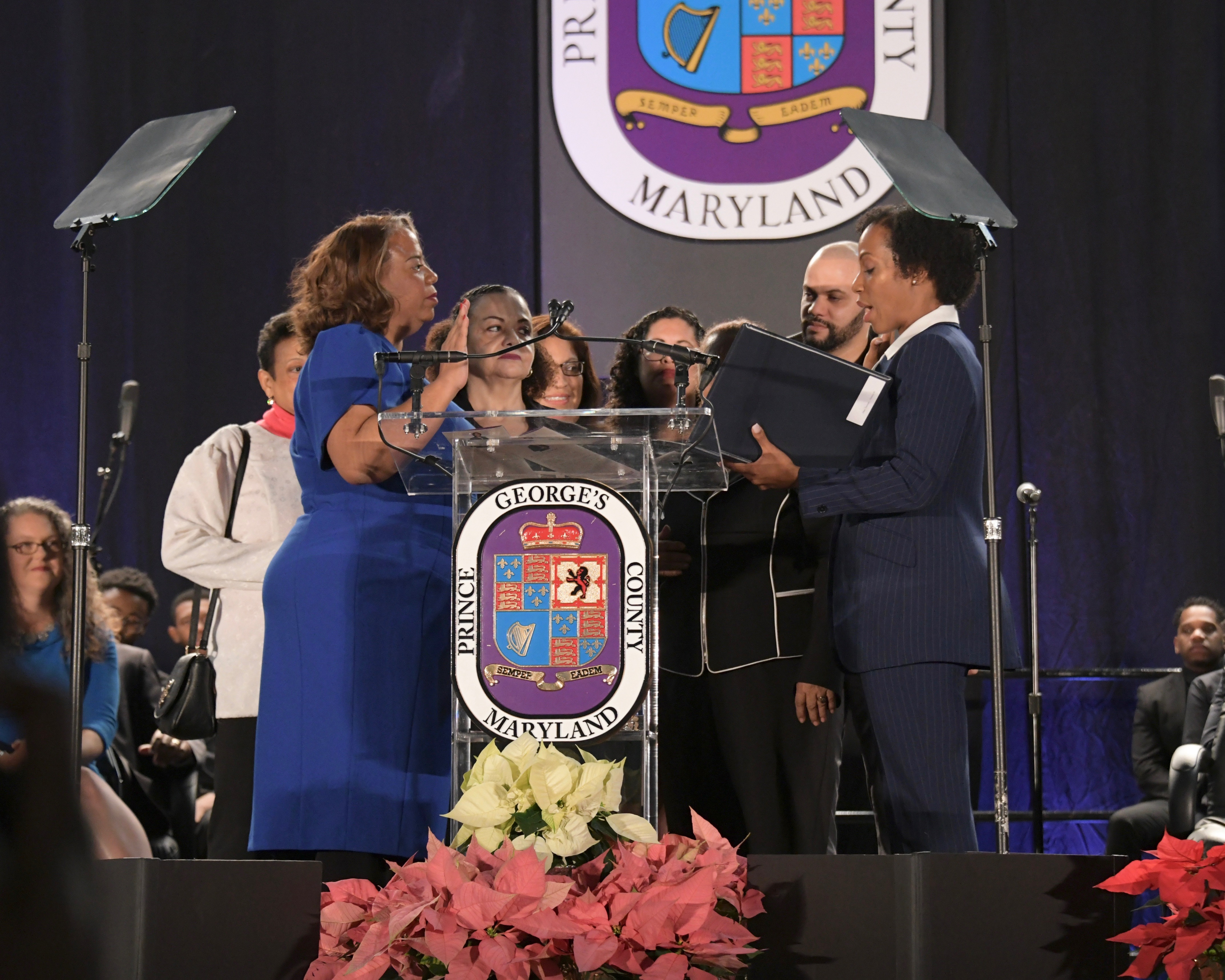
Taveras being sworn in as county councilmember, 2018

Taveras was sworn into the Prince George's County Council on December 1, 2014, making her the first Latina elected to the council. She was re-elected in 2018 after narrowly winning the Democratic primary against Hyattsville mayor Candace Hollingsworth. In December 2020, the council voted to elect Taveras to serve as its vice chair.

In September 2021, Taveras, termed out of running for a third term on the Prince George's County Council, announced that she would for the Maryland House of Delegates in District 47B in 2022. She won the Democratic primary on July 19, 2022, receiving 52.6 percent of the vote in the Democratic primary election.

=== In the legislature ===
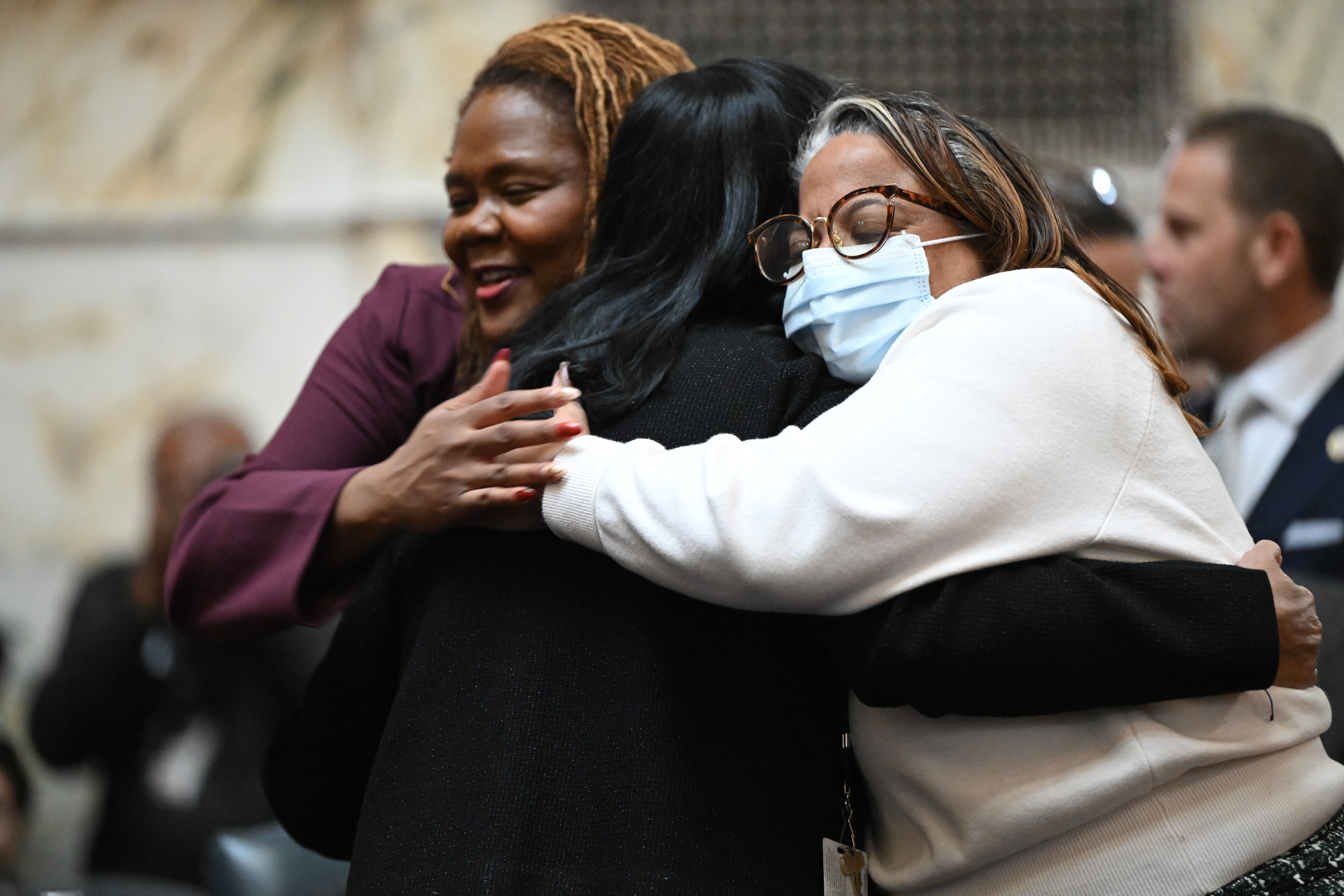
Taveras, Melissa Wells, and House Speaker Joseline Peña-Melnyk share a hug on the House floor, 2025

Taveras was sworn into the Maryland House of Delegates on January 11, 2023. She is a member of the House Health and Government Operations Committee. In November 2026, House Speaker Joseline Peña-Melnyk named Taveras as the House deputy majority leader.

== Political positions ==
=== Education ===
In February 2025, Taveras spoke in support of a bill that would require require public schools to teach age-appropriate health education that included sexual orientation, family, and gender identity courses, saying that such courses would have helped her understand her first menstrual cycle.

During the 2026 legislative session, Taveras introduced legislation that would require some new school buses to have seat belts.

=== Housing and development ===
In 2016, Taveras introduced legislation that would hold landlords and property managers accountable for sex trafficking at their rental properties. The bill passed the county council unanimously and was signed into law by County Executive Baker.

In October 2018, Taveras voted against overriding County Executive Rushern Baker's veto on a bill that would waive a school facilities surcharge for certain residential developers.

In September 2020, Taveras introduced the "Fair Housing Act", a bill to strengthen the county's code enforcement to improve the quality of housing.

=== Immigration ===
In 2019, Taveras voted in favor of legislation that would block all county agencies from engaging in immigration enforcement.

=== Policing ===
In 2019, Taveras introduced legislation that would require all police officers to wear body cameras. Following the killing of William Green, a handcuffed man, by police officer Michael Owen Jr. in January 2020, Taveras reintroduced the bill.

=== Social issues ===
In 2015, Taveras was one of two county councilmembers to vote in favor of a proposal to provide paid sick leave to workers in Prince George's County.

In 2018, Taveras voted in favor of legislation that would establish a public financing program for local candidates by 2026.

=== Statewide and national politics ===
Taveras endorsed Hillary Clinton for president on November 17, 2015.

In 2021, Taveras endorsed state delegate Brooke Lierman for Comptroller of Maryland. She initially endorsed former Prince George's County Executive Rushern Baker for Governor of Maryland, but later endorsed author and former nonprofit CEO Wes Moore after Baker suspended his campaign.

=== Transportation ===
Taveras expressed concern over the construction of the Purple Line in her district, saying "I don't want to lose the vibrancy and the diversity that we currently have in our community. That is what makes us who we are in Langley Park and gives us the rich vibrancy that we have." Despite her concerns, she acknowledged that this displacement was inevitable in the long run, even with all the potential benefits of the Purple Line. She also expressed skepticism over a plan to add toll lanes to the Capital Beltway and Interstate 270 using public-private partnerships.

== Personal life ==
Taveras lives in Adelphi, Maryland, and attends religious services at the Grace DC Church in Washington, D.C.

== Electoral history ==
Prince George's County Council District 2 Democratic primary election, 2014
Party	Candidate	Votes	%
Democratic	Deni Taveras	2,423	50.1
Democratic	Doyle Niemann	2,417	49.9

Prince George's County Council District 2 election, 2014
Party	Candidate	Votes	%
Democratic	Deni Taveras	10,000	98.5
Write-in		152	1.5

Prince George's County Council District 2 Democratic primary election, 2018
Party	Candidate	Votes	%
Democratic	Deni Taveras	3,597	52.6
Democratic	Candace Hollingsworth	3,240	47.4

Prince George's County Council District 2 election, 2018
Party	Candidate	Votes	%
Democratic	Deni Taveras	16,290	98.3
Write-in		279	1.7

Maryland House of Delegates District 47B Democratic primary election, 2022
Party	Candidate	Votes	%
Democratic	Deni Taveras	1,012	52.6
Democratic	Marlin Jenkins	872	45.3
Democratic	Jorge Sactic	41	2.1

Maryland House of Delegates District 47B election, 2022
Party	Candidate	Votes	%
Democratic	Deni Taveras	3,259	98.10
Write-in		63	1.90
