= George Snyder (politician) =

Former Maryland Senate Majority Leader (1929–2017)

Senator George E. Snyder

Member of the Maryland Senate from the 1st senatorial district
- In office 1959–1974
- Preceded by: Charles L. Downey (R)
- Succeeded by: John P. Corderman (D)

Personal details
- Born: January 12, 1929 Hagerstown, Maryland, U.S.
- Died: April 5, 2017 (aged 88) Boone, North Carolina, U.S.
- Party: Democratic
- Spouse: Karen E. Snyder
- Children: 6
- Education: B.A., Public Administration, University of Maryland attended the University of Maryland School of Law
- Occupation: Politician, businessman, author, and inventor

George Elmer Snyder (January 12, 1929 – April 5, 2017) was an American politician, businessman, author, inventor, and marketing professional. He served in the Maryland State Senate from 1959 to 1974. Snyder served as the Majority leader of the Maryland Senate and was the Chairman of the Maryland Senate Finance Committee from 1971 to 1974.

== Biography ==
Born in Hagerstown, Maryland, Snyder attended Washington County Public Schools. He then graduated from the University of Maryland and attended the University of Maryland School of Law. Snyder was married to Karen Englehart Snyder and had six children and ten grandchildren. He served in elected office as a Democrat, although he ran as a Republican in the 1982 Florida Senate Race for the seat occupied by Lawton Chiles. He served as the President of the National Taxpayers Union and led a nationwide effort to pass a Balanced Budget Amendment to the United States Constitution. Snyder died in 2017 at the Glenbridge Health and Rehabilitation Center in Boone, North Carolina.

== Political career ==
=== Maryland General Assembly ===
In 1958 at the age of 29, Snyder was elected to serve in the Maryland State Senate representing Washington County. He served a total of four terms, eventually retiring from Maryland politics in 1974 after withdrawing from the Democratic primary for Governor of Maryland. By 1971, Snyder served as the Democratic Senate Majority Leader, member of the Legislative Council, and was Chairman of the Senate Finance Committee. He was a member of the Maryland delegation to the 1968 Democratic National Convention in Chicago where he eventually voted to nominate Hubert Humphrey to become the democratic nominee for President of the United States.

==== Election results ====
Year	Office	Election	Date	Subject	Party	Votes	%	Opponent	Party	Votes	%
1958	Senator, 1st senatorial district	Primary	May 20	George E. Snyder	Democratic	3,921	53.4%	Myron L. Bloom	Democratic	3,423	46.6%
1958	Senator, 1st senatorial district	General	November 4	George E. Snyder	Democratic	14,199	54.7%	Omer T. Kaylor Jr.	Republican	11,763	45.3%
1962	Senator, 1st senatorial district	Primary	May 15	George E. Snyder	Democratic	6,336	79.7%	J. Joseph Allen	Democratic	1,610	20.3%
1962	Senator, 1st senatorial district	General	November 6	George E. Snyder	Democratic	15,970	67.2%	D. Keller Ridenour	Republican	7,779	32.8%
1966	Senator, 1st senatorial district	Primary	September 13	George E. Snyder	Democratic	4,098	68%	Richard J. Chaney	Democratic	1,926	32%
1966	Senator, 1st senatorial district	General	November 8	George E. Snyder	Democratic	9,747	59.7%	Kenneth R. Daniels	Republican	6,590	40.3%
1970	Senator, 1st senatorial district	Primary	September 15	George E. Snyder	Democratic	N/A	N/A	Unopposed			
1970	Senator, 1st Senatorial district	General	November 3	George E. Snyder	Democratic	10,709	63%	Catherine L. Beachley	Republican	6,289	37%

==== Committee assignments and leadership roles ====
- Member of Maryland State Senate, 1959–1974
- Chair, Aviation, Roads, and Transportation Committee, 1963–1966
- Correctional Administration Committee, 1965–1968
- Taxation and Fiscal Matters Committee, 1965–1968
- Special Joint Committee on Prisons, 1967
- Chairman, Finance Committee, 1971–1974
- Member, Legislative Council, 1971–1974
- Senate Majority Leader, 1971–1974

=== Candidacy for Governor of Maryland ===
A 1974 Maryland gubernatorial campaign bumper sticker for the short-lived Snyder–Pressman ticket

After years of deep conflict with then-sitting Governor Marvin Mandel, Snyder publicly announced that he would challenge Mandel in the Democratic primary for the Office of Governor. Hyman A. Pressman, the Comptroller of Baltimore, filed as his running mate seeking the party's nomination for the Office of the Lieutenant Governor of Maryland. Pressman previously ran as an independent candidate in the 1966 Maryland gubernatorial election. After several weeks it became clear that the demographic challenges of running for state-wide office from the relatively less densely populated western part of the state would hamper the campaign. On July 18, 1974, Snyder ended the campaign.

== Balanced Budget Amendment and the National Taxpayers Union ==
Snyder lobbied and testified before more than 40 state legislatures in a campaign to get the states to force a constitutional convention to pass a Balanced Budget Amendment. By 1979, the effort to push the states to support an amendment had made serious progress with 29 of the 34 states required for a constitutional convention. Working at the federal level proved challenging, but several successes were achieved in the early 1980s. On May 19, 1981, the Senate Judiciary Committee, for the first time, approved the proposed constitutional amendment by a vote of 11–1. At the time, Snyder declared: ”This is really a great day for the American taxpayers. The fiscal affairs of our country are about to be afforded the same safeguards as our Constitution freedoms ... and may be as crucial to protecting those rights.”

An opposition effort, particularly at the state-level, was led by then-Massachusetts Lt. Governor Thomas P. O'Neill III and a number of organizations including the AFL–CIO and Common Cause, led by Fred Wertheimer.

After the departure of Grover Norquist from the leadership of the National Taxpayers Union in 1982, Snyder was appointed executive director of the organization.

== 1982 United States Senate campaign ==
After moving to Sarasota, Florida, in the late 1970s, Snyder broadened his career as a business consultant and made the decision to become a Republican. Leaning on his prior experience in elected office, he filed to run for the United States Senate in the 1982 election against the incumbent Senator Lawton Chiles. He was defeated in a three-way Republican primary carrying 27 percent of votes cast.

== Business and innovation ==
As a serial entrepreneur, Snyder was involved in founding, co-founding, or acquiring numerous businesses throughout his life. He was the holder of several patents on processes and devices. Snyder owned a soft pretzel company, Dutchie, Inc. of Smithsburg, Maryland, where he pioneered frozen foods processes and methods of distribution. For example, Snyder developed and patented a then-novel design for a compact oven intended for use by commercial clients in the shopping, amusements, entertainment, and sport sectors.

== Bibliography ==
- Don't Be a Spin Sucker: What You Need to Know to Restore the Republic Our Founding Fathers Envisioned, Writers Club Press, October 2000, ISBN 0-595-14529-9.
- Beyond the Game Plan, Hub Publishers, 1974, ISBN B0006CDS2Y.
- PQ Trumps IQ, Xlibris, April 2010, ISBN 1-4500-8453-2.

Maryland Senate
Preceded by Harry Hughes	Majority Leader of the Maryland Senate; 1971–1975	Succeeded by Roy N. Staten
