= Jim Hinebaugh =

American politician (born 1946)

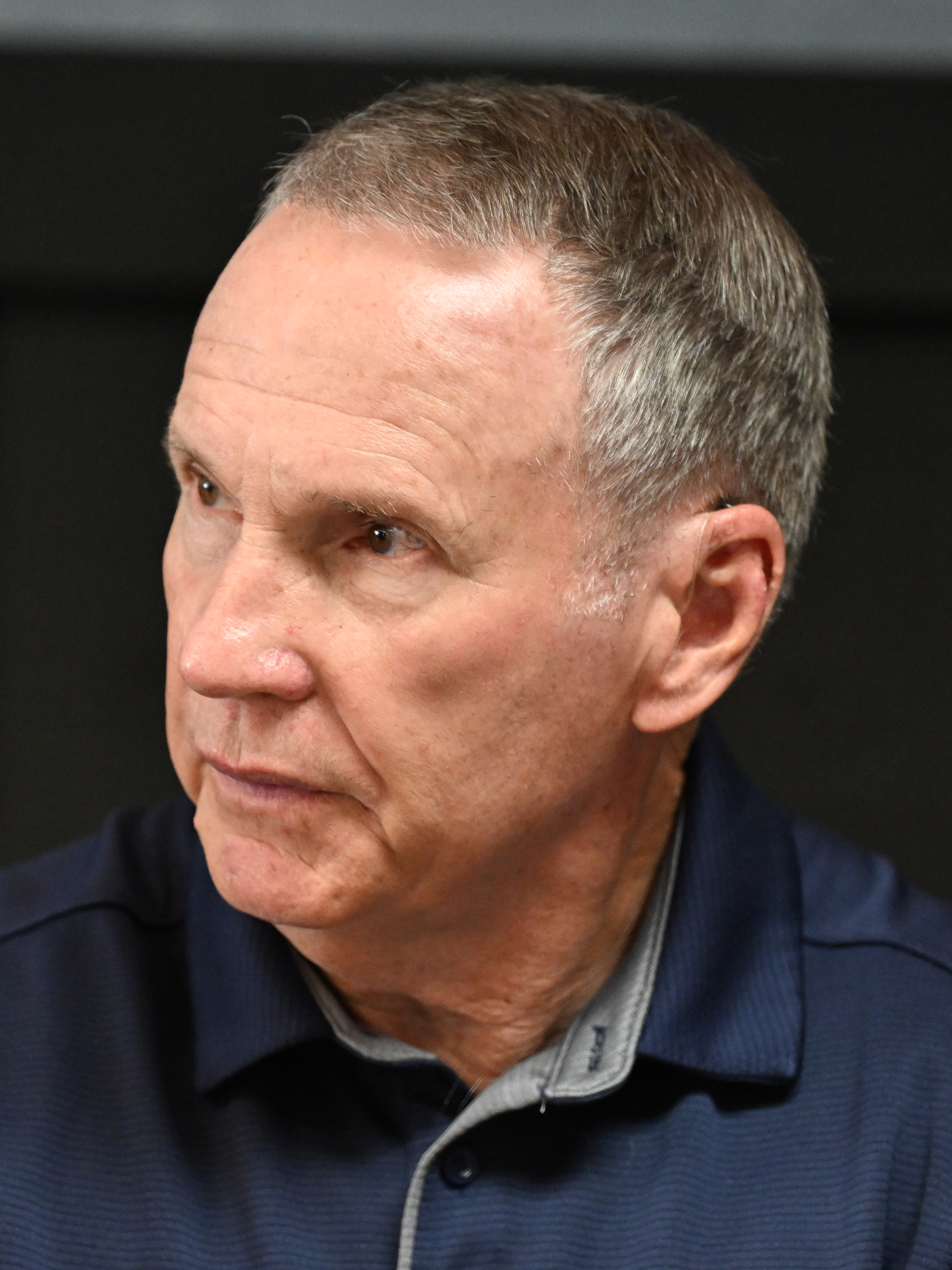
- Hinebaugh in 2025

Member of the Maryland House of Delegates from the 1A district
- Incumbent
- Assumed office January 11, 2023
- Preceded by: Wendell R. Beitzel

Member of the Garrett County Board of Commissioners, District 3
- In office December 9, 2014 – December 7, 2022
- Preceded by: Bob Gatto
- Succeeded by: Ryan Savage

Personal details
- Born: James Carlton Hinebaugh Jr. December 12, 1946 (age 79) Oakland, Maryland, U.S.
- Party: Republican
- Children: 4
- Education: University of Southern Mississippi (BS); Shippensburg University of Pennsylvania (MBA)

Military service
- Allegiance: United States
- Branch/service: United States Army
- Years of service: 1966–1995
- Rank: Colonel
- Battles/wars: Vietnam War
- Awards: Air Medal; Bronze Star w/Combat V Defense Distinguished Service Medal; Legion of Merit; Meritorious Service Medal; Valorous Unit Award; Vietnamese Cross of Gallantry

James Carlton Hinebaugh Jr. (born December 12, 1946) is an American politician. He is a member of the Maryland House of Delegates for District 1A in Garrett and Allegany counties. He previously served as a member of the Garrett County Board of Commissioners, representing District 3 from 2014 to 2022.

== Background ==
James Carlton Hinebaugh Jr. graduated from Southern Garrett High School. He graduated from the University of Southern Mississippi in 1974 with a Bachelor of Science in computer science and mathematics. In 1988, Hinebaugh graduated from Shippensburg University of Pennsylvania with a Master of Business Administration degree in public administration.

In 1966, Hinebaugh was activated in the United States Army and was deployed overseas for eight years, including service in Vietnam. He retired as a colonel in 1995.

In August 1995, Hinebaugh was appointed Director of the Garrett County Department of Economic Development. During his tenure, the department experienced numerous business expansions, a decrease in the unemployment rate from 13.7 percent in 1997 to 7.5 percent in 2011, and the creation of six industrial parks. He also helped establish the Garrett County Scholarships Program in 2006, which provides two years of free tuition at Garrett College to county high school graduates. He retired from this position on October 1, 2012.

In 2014, Hinebaugh ran for the Garrett County Board of Commissioners in District 3, challenging incumbent commissioner Bob Gatto. He defeated Gatto in the Republican primary, receiving 36.8 percent of the vote to Gatto's 33.3 percent. He won the general election with 47.7 percent of the vote.

== Garrett County Commissioner ==
Hinebaugh was sworn in as a member of the Garrett County Board of Commissioners on December 9, 2014. He won re-election to a second term in 2018.

In January 2019, Hinebaugh was elected on one-year term the Maryland Association of Counties board of directors. In December 2021, Hinebaugh was named to serve on the association's executive board.

In 2022, Hinebaugh filed to run for the Maryland House of Delegates in District 1A, seeking to succeed retiring state delegate Wendell R. Beitzel. He won the Republican primary on July 19, 2022, receiving 58.5 percent of the vote, and later won the general election on November 8.

== In the legislature ==
Hinebaugh was sworn into the Maryland House of Delegates on January 11, 2023. He was a member of the House Appropriations Committee.

Hinebaugh did not seek re-election to a second term in 2026.

== Personal life ==
Hinebaugh is married to his wife Barbara. Together, they have four children, and live in Oakland, Maryland. Hinebaugh attends religious services at the St. Matthew's Episcopal Church in Oakland.

=== Decorations and badges ===
Hinebaugh's decorations and medals include:

Air Medal
Bronze Star w/Combat V
Defense Distinguished Service Medal
Legion of Merit
Meritorious Service Medal
Valorous Unit Award
Vietnamese Cross of Gallantry

== Electoral history ==
Garrett County Commissioner District 3 Republican primary election, 2014
Party	Candidate	Votes	%
Republican	Jim Hinebaugh	1,486	36.8
Republican	Bob Gatto (incumbent)	1,346	33.3
Republican	Dave Beard	567	14.0
Republican	Jeff Haines	497	12.3
Republican	Chad A. Maroney	146	3.6

Garrett County Commissioner District 3 election, 2014
Party	Candidate	Votes	%
Republican	Jim Hinebaugh	4,340	47.7
Republican	Bob Gatto (write-in)	1,703	18.7
Independent	James R. "Smokey" Stanton	1,423	15.6
Libertarian	Bill Welch	920	10.1
Democratic	April Hebden	699	7.7
Write-in		21	0.2

Garrett County Commissioner District 3 Republican primary election, 2018
Party	Candidate	Votes	%
Republican	Jim Hinebaugh, Jr.	1,302	38.9
Republican	Bob Gatto	1,221	36.4
Republican	Fred Fox	828	24.7

Garrett County Commissioner District 3 election, 2018
Party	Candidate	Votes	%
Republican	Jim Hinebaugh, Jr.	8,031	82.3
Republican	Bob Gatto (write-in)	1,656	17.0
Write-in		75	0.8

Maryland House of Delegates District 1A Republican primary election, 2022
Party	Candidate	Votes	%
Republican	Jim Hinebaugh Jr.	3,900	58.5
Republican	Tim Thomas	2,184	32.7
Republican	Andy Adams	488	7.3
Republican	Kenneth Linn Sisk	98	1.5

Maryland House of Delegates District 1A election, 2022
Party	Candidate	Votes	%
Republican	Jim Hinebaugh Jr.	11,971	77.25
Democratic	Robert Spear	2,829	18.26
Libertarian	Monique M. Mehring	671	4.33
Write-in		25	0.16
