= Krysiak =

Krysiak is a Polish-language surname. It is a patronymic surname of Northern Poland origin formed by the addition of the diminutive suffix "-ak" to the diminutive form Kryś of father's first name Krzysztof (Christopher) or Krystian (Christian).

Notable people with this surname include:

- Artur Krysiak (born 1989), Polish footballer
- Carolyn J. Krysiak (born 1939), American politician
- Ludwika Krysiak (1912–1944), Polish World War II underground fighter
- Wojciech Krysiak (born 1998), Polish gymnast
