= Raymond A. Dypski =

American politician (1923–2004)

Member of the Maryland House of Delegates
- In office 1967–1986
- Constituency: Baltimore, Maryland

Personal details
- Born: June 21, 1923 Baltimore, Maryland, U.S.
- Died: October 31, 2004 (aged 81) Baltimore, Maryland, U.S.
- Party: Democratic
- Relatives: Cornell N. Dypski (brother)
- Military career
- Allegiance: United States
- Branch: U.S. Merchant Marine
- Service years: 1943–1945
- Conflicts: World War II

Raymond A. Dypski (June 21, 1923 – October 31, 2004) was an American politician who served as a member of the Maryland House of Delegates representing Baltimore, Maryland.

== Early life ==
Dypski was born in a two-story row house on Dillon Street in Baltimore on June 21, 1923. He attended Baltimore public schools. His father was an Austrian immigrant and his mother worked in a cannery in Canton. His father died from an automobile accident when he was a child.

Dypski dropped out of junior high school to serve in World War II. He later got his GED at Patterson High School in 1969.

== Career ==
After dropping out, Dypski served with the U.S. Merchant Marines from 1943 to 1945, during World War II. He was a metallurgical tester and inspector for the Bethlehem Steel Corporation at Sparrows Point.

Dypski served in the Maryland House of Delegates, representing Baltimore, from 1967 to 1986. He decided not to seek re-election due to failing health.

== Personal life ==
His younger brother, Cornell N. Dypski, was also a member of the Maryland House of Delegates and a member of the Maryland Senate.

He was friends with state senator Julian L. Lapides.

== Death ==
Dypski died on October 31, 2004, of heart and kidney failure at Mercy Medical Center in Baltimore.
