= Barbara A. Hoffman =

American politician (1940-2021)

Member of the Maryland Senate from the 42nd district
- In office January 1983 – January 8, 2003
- Preceded by: Rosalie Silber Abrams
- Succeeded by: James Brochin

Personal details
- Born: March 8, 1940 Baltimore, Maryland, U.S.
- Died: June 20, 2021 (aged 81)
- Party: Democratic
- Spouse: Donald Hoffman
- Children: 3
- Education: Towson State University (BA); Johns Hopkins University(MA)

Barbara A. Hoffman (March 8, 1940 - June 20, 2021) was a member of the Maryland State Senate from 1983-2003. She was appointed to the State Senate by Governor Harry Hughes after Rosalie Silber Abrams left the seat to join the governor's administration. From 1995 to 2003, Hoffman served as chair of the Budget and Taxation Committee, the first woman to hold the position.

Hoffman was in the 42nd legislative district until 2003 when she was redistricted into the 41st district, where she lost the Democratic primary to State Delegate Lisa Gladden

== Personal life ==
Hoffman was married to her husband, Donald, and the couple had three children and six grandchildren. She was Jewish.
