= Simon L. Downey =

American politician

Member of the Maryland House of Delegates from Washington County
- In office January 1947 – October 24, 1950
- Succeeded by: Jacob B. Berkson
- In office January 1927 – January 1931

Personal details
- Born: Simon Long Downey; June 4, 1877 Downsville, Maryland, U.S.
- Died: October 24, 1950 (aged 73) Downsville, Maryland, U.S.
- Party: Republican
- Spouse: Florence Snavely (m. 1904)
- Children: 5, including Charles

Simon Long Downey (June 4, 1877 – October 24, 1950) was an American farmer and politician who served two non-consecutive terms in the Maryland House of Delegates.
