= Cornell N. Dypski =

American politician (1931–2009)

Member of the Maryland House of Delegates from the 46th district
- In office January 14, 1987 – January 8, 2003
- Succeeded by: Brian K. McHale

Member of the Maryland Senate from the 47th district
- In office 1975–1983
- Succeeded by: redistricted into District 46

Personal details
- Born: September 23, 1931 Baltimore, Maryland, U.S.
- Died: January 20, 2009 (aged 77) Hunt Valley, Maryland, U.S.
- Party: Democratic
- Spouse: Joyce Houtz
- Children: 1
- Relatives: Raymond A. Dypski (brother)

Cornell N. Dypski (September 23, 1931 – January 20, 2009) was a member of the Maryland Senate representing the 47th district and a member of the Maryland House of Delegates representing the 46th district.

== Early life ==
Cornell N. Dypski was born and raised in a two-story rowhouse on Dillon Street in Baltimore on September 23, 1931. His father was an Austrian immigrant and his mother worked in a cannery in Canton. His father died from an automobile accident when he was a child. He graduated from the Baltimore Polytechnic Institute in 1950 and attended the University of Baltimore.

== Career ==
Dypski worked as an insurance salesman. He also worked as a court constable. He then worked as an administrative officer at the Maryland Motor Vehicle Administration from 1972 to 1994.

He represented 47th District of the Maryland State Senate from 1975 to 1983. It was redistricted into the 46th District in 1983. In 1995, he was a member of the Governor's Commission on Baltimore City Automobile-Insurance Rate Reduction. He also represented District 46 of the Maryland House of Delegates from January 14, 1987, to January 8, 2003.

He was a four year recipient of the Community Service Award for work as a chair of the United Charity Campaign.

== Personal life ==
Dypski married Joyce Houtz. Together, they had one son: Michael C. Dypski.

Dypski was friends with fellow state senator Julian L. Lapides. His older brother, Raymond A. Dypski, was also a member of the Maryland House of Delegates in the 46th District in 1966.

== Death ==
Dypski died on January 20, 2009, at Gilchrist Hospice Care in Hunt Valley, Maryland.
