= Charles L. Downey =

American politician (1915–1990)

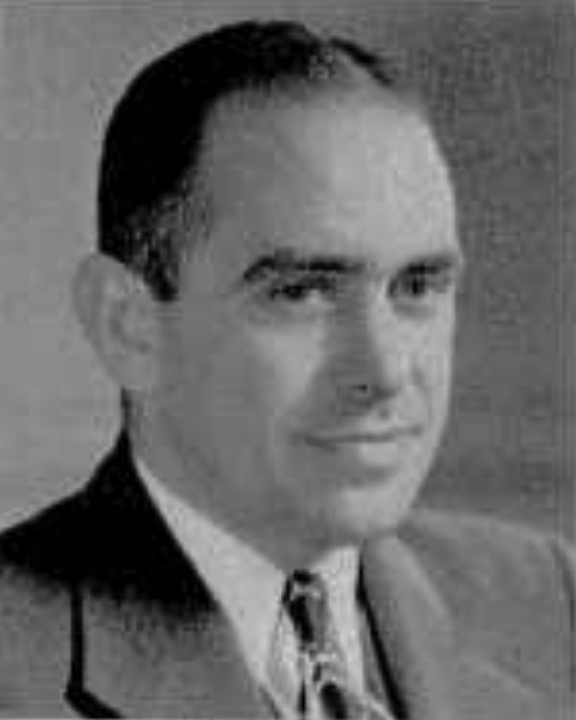

Member of the Maryland Senate from Washington County
- In office January 11, 1955 – January 1959
- Appointed by: Theodore McKeldin
- Preceded by: D. Kenneth McLaughlin
- Succeeded by: George Snyder

Member of the Maryland House of Delegates from Washington County
- In office January 1951 – January 11, 1955
- Preceded by: Jacob B. Berkson
- Succeeded by: William G. Porter Jr.

Personal details
- Born: Charles Lee Downey; May 31, 1915 Williamsport, Maryland, U.S.
- Died: August 21, 1990 (aged 75) Hagerstown, Maryland, U.S.
- Party: Republican
- Spouse: Edith Ursula Bell (m. 1939)
- Education: University of Maryland (BS)

Military service
- Allegiance: United States
- Branch/service: United States Army
- Years of service: 1941–1945
- Rank: Major
- Unit: 102nd Infantry Division
- Battles/wars: World War II

Charles Lee Downey (May 31, 1915 – August 21, 1990) was an American politician. He succeeded his father, Simon, in the Maryland House of Delegates, and, shortly after winning election to a second term, he was appointed by Governor Theodore McKeldin to fill a vacancy in the state senate. He later served on the Washington County commission.
