= John J. Hafer =

American politician (1932–2019)

Member of the Maryland Senate from the 1st district
- In office January 9, 1991 – January 10, 2007
- Preceded by: John N. Bambacus
- Succeeded by: George C. Edwards

Personal details
- Born: February 25, 1932 Frostburg, Maryland, U.S.
- Died: June 5, 2019 (aged 87) Frostburg, Maryland, U.S.
- Party: Republican
- Spouse: Lorene Garrison Hafer
- Education: University of Pennsylvania; Pittsburgh Institute of Mortuary Science
- Profession: Funeral Director

John J. Hafer (1932–2019) represented District 1 in the Maryland Senate, which covers Garrett, Allegany, and Washington Counties. He retired from office in 2007.

== Education ==
Hafer attended Wharton School at the University of Pennsylvania and received his B.S. (economics), graduating in 1954. He later graduated from the Pittsburgh Institute of Mortuary Science in 1958.

== Career ==
Hafer was a medic in the U.S. Army and also was a funeral director.

Hafer was a member of the Maryland Farm Bureau, the Allegany County Farm Bureau, and the Cumberland Chamber of Commerce. He was also a member of Mason Lodge, Scottish Rite 32nd degree, Tall Cedar of Lebanon, Past Potentate, Ali Ghan Shrine Temple, and is a Past Grand Tall Cedar. He is also a member of the Fraternal Order of Police, Farrady American Legion Post, Cumberland B.P.O. Elks; Cumberland Moose. Past chair, Salvation Army and the American Cancer Crusade.

== Election results ==
- 2002 Race for Maryland State Senate – District 1

Name	Votes	Percent	Outcome
John J. Hafer, Rep.	29,602	99.4%	Won
Other Write-Ins	180	0.6%	Lost

- 1998 Race for Maryland State Senate – District 1

Name	Votes	Percent	Outcome
John J. Hafer, Rep.	20,552	100%	Won

- 1994 Race for Maryland State Senate – District 1

Name	Votes	Percent	Outcome
John J. Hafer, Rep.	20,496	71%	Won
Edward A. Malloy Jr., Dem.	8,209	29%	Lost

- 1990 Race for Maryland State Senate – District 1

Name	Votes	Percent	Outcome
John J. Hafer, Rep.	14,397	59%	Won
Daniel F. McMullen, Dem.	10,126	41%	Lost
