= Patrick T. Welsh =

American politician (1950–2007)

Member of the Maryland Senate from the 8th district
- In office 1979–1982
- Preceded by: Roy N. Staten
- Succeeded by: Thomas L. Bromwell

Member of the Maryland House of Delegates
- In office 1975–1978

Personal details
- Born: August 12, 1950 Baltimore, Maryland, U.S.
- Died: April 3, 2007 (aged 56) Towson, Maryland, U.S.
- Resting place: Oak Lawn Cemetery; Baltimore, Maryland, U.S.
- Party: Democratic (before 1990s); Republican (1990s and after)
- Spouse(s): Marcy Mary Scultz; Gussie Jones; Jocelyn Mejorda
- Children: 3
- Education: Towson State College (BA)
- Occupation: Politician; steelworker; realtor

Patrick T. Welsh (August 12, 1950 – April 3, 2007) was a politician, steelworker and realtor from Dundalk, Maryland. He served as a member of the Maryland House of Delegates from 1975 to 1978 and served as a member of the Maryland Senate, representing District 8 from 1979 to 1982.

== Early life and education ==
Patrick T. Welsh was born on August 12, 1950, in Baltimore. He attended parochial schools in Anne Arundel County. He graduated from St. Joseph's High School in Irvington in 1968. He graduated with a Bachelor of Arts in economics and political science from Towson State College in 1972. He later was a graduate of the Realtor Institute.

== Career ==
Welsh was a Democrat. Welsh served in the Maryland House of Delegates, representing Baltimore County, from 1975 to 1978. He was a member of the Economic Matters Committee and secretary of the Baltimore County delegation from 1977 to 1978. He was also a member of the Port of Baltimore Subcommittee in 1977. Welsh served in the Maryland Senate, representing District 8, from 1979 to 1982. He was vice chair of the Baltimore County delegation. He served as a member on the Judicial Proceedings Committee, Joint Committee on Juvenile Justice and the Joint Committee on Corrections. In the early 1990s, Welsh switched his political affiliation to the Republican Party. In 1999, Welsh co-founded Citizens Against Open Bay Dumping with E. J. Pipkin.

Welsh worked as a steelworker in the mobile equipment department of Bethlehem Steel. Welsh became a sales associate at Coldwell Banker/Russell T. Baker in 1982. He later had managerial positions at Coldwell Banker. He was also a sales office manager at O'Conor, Piper & Flynn in Baltimore. He also worked as a manager at Re/Max Acclaimed. In 2002, Welsh established Patrick T. Welsh & Associates.

He served as president of the Eastern Baltimore Chamber of Commerce. Welsh was a certified real estate broker and certified residential specialist. He served as vice president of the Greater Baltimore Board of Realtors. He was also a member of the Mayor's Advisory Committee on Municipal Problems and Solutions in 1973 and the Private Sector Advisory Board in 1983.

== Personal life ==
Welsh lived in Dundalk his entire life. Welsh married three times. He married Marcy Mary Schultz and Gussie Jones. Around 2005, Welsh married Jocelyn Mejorda. He had three sons, Patrick T. Jr., Emmanuel and Jose. He was a baseball fan and collected coins.

Welsh died of pancreatic cancer on April 3, 2007, at Gilchrist Center for Hospice Care in Towson. He was buried at Oak Lawn Cemetery in Baltimore.
