= Northern Garrett High School =

Location
- 86 Pride Pkwy; Accident, Garrett, MD 21520 –2006; United States
- Coordinates: 39°39′53″N 79°17′51″W

Information
- Type: Public secondary
- Status: Currently operational
- School district: Garrett County Public Schools
- NCES District ID: 2400360
- Superintendent: Brenda E. McCartney
- School code: MD-11-113512
- CEEB code: 210005
- NCES School ID: 240036000671
- Principal: David Yoder
- Faculty: 33.73 (on an FTE basis)
- Grades: 9-12
- Enrollment: 444 (2023-2024)
  - Grade 9: 125
  - Grade 10: 108
  - Grade 11: 109
  - Grade 12: 102
- Student to teacher ratio: 13.16:1
- Campus type: Rural, Remote
- Colors: Royal Blue and Gold
- Athletics: Football, boys/girls soccer, cross country, golf, boys/girls basketball, wrestling, bocce, tennis, baseball, softball, & track
- Athletics conference: MPSSAA
- Nickname: Huskies
- USNWR ranking: 5,756
- Feeder schools: Northern Garrett Middle School
- Website: gcps.net/northern-garrett-high

Northern Garrett High School is a four-year public secondary education school located just North of Accident, Maryland, United States, that enrolls 444 students from the northern end of Garrett County. It is part of the Garrett County Public Schools school district. The school mascot is the Husky, and the school colors are royal blue and gold.

== School structure ==
Students attend school for 180 days per school year, starting from the last week of August through the end of May, and generally through the first several days of June as well. Five additional days are added to the calendar as make-up days. Due to the tremendous amounts of snowfall in Garrett County, it is not unusual for the school to need additional make-up days; therefore, they either add days at the end of the school year or during scheduled days off.

The day is divided into 5 periods and a study hall period, which was reduced in 2009 from 7 periods to unify the county's two high schools, including Southern Garrett High School.

== Admissions ==
The 444 students of Northern High School come from Accident, Friendsville, Grantsville, and Route 40 Elementary Schools, as well as Northern Garrett Middle School. Most students are from the towns of Accident, Friendsville, Jennings, Grantsville, and Finzel.

== Curriculum ==
Northern Garrett High School has 23 Advanced Placement choices available for the students:

- AP Art History
- AP Biology
- AP Calculus AB
- AP Calculus BC
- AP Chemistry
- AP Computer Science A
- AP Computer Science Principles
- AP Cybersecurity
- AP English Language & Composition
- AP English Literature & Composition
- AP Environmental Science
- AP Music Theory
- AP Physics I
- AP Pre-Calculus
- AP Psychology
- AP Research
- AP Seminar
- AP Spanish Language & Culture
- AP Statistics
- AP 2-D Art & Design
- AP 3-D Art & Design
- AP U.S. Government and Politics
- AP U.S. History

Northern Garrett High School also partners with Garrett College to offer seniors the ability to take a variety of college classes and earn college credits while still in high school.

== Extracurricular activities ==
War of the Classes

During the early dismissal before students leave for Thanksgiving break, students gather in the gymnasium. Ten to twelve students from each grade are selected to compete against the other grades in games such as "Turkey Bowling," War of the Classes, and the Loudest Class.

Pep Rally

During the last Friday before the homecoming football game, students and faculty gather in the gymnasium to prepare the football team and their fans for the first home game of the year. During this time, homecoming courts are announced.

== Notable alumni ==
- George C. Edwards - former Maryland State Senator
