= Edward J. Mason (politician) =

American politician (1930–2020)

Member of the Maryland Senate from the 1st district
- In office 1971–1983
- Preceded by: Ronald C. Brubaker (D)
- Succeeded by: John N. Bambacus (R)

Senate Minority Leader
- In office 1975–1983

Personal details
- Born: June 12, 1930 Cresaptown, Maryland
- Died: September 9, 2020 (aged 90) Cumberland, Maryland
- Resting place: Saints Peter and Paul Cemetery, Cumberland, Maryland
- Party: Republican
- Spouse: Sara Jane Dickerhoff
- Children: 3
- Parents: Bertram A. Mason (father); Cora Donahoe Gunning (mother)
- Education: Saint Fedelis Seminary, Herman, PA; La Salle High School in Cumberland, MD (graduated 1948).
- Alma mater: University of Maryland; Strayer's Business College, Certificate, 1951.
- Occupation: Dairy farmer; hotel and restaurant proprietor.

Military service
- Branch/service: U.S. Air Force
- Years of service: 1949-56

Edward Joseph Mason (June 12, 1930 – September 9, 2020) was a Republican State Senator from Maryland's 1st district, which then covered Garrett County and part of Allegany County. Initially elected in November 1970, he served from January 1971 to January 1983. He was the Senate Minority Leader from January 1975 until he left office.

Mason was the 1972 Republican nominee in Maryland's 6th congressional district, losing the general election to incumbent Democrat Goodloe Byron.

Mason left office after losing the 1982 Republican primary to John N. Bambacus who went on to win the general election.

== Election results ==
- 1970 General Election for Maryland State Senate – District 1

| Name | Votes | Percent | Outcome |
|---|---|---|---|
| Edward J. Mason, Rep. | 4,673 | 54% | Won |
| Ronald C. Brubaker, Dem. | 4,040 | 46% | |

- 1972 General Election for Maryland's 6th Congressional District

| Name | Votes | Percent | Outcome |
|---|---|---|---|
| Goodloe Byron, Dem. | 107,288 | 65% | Won |
| Edward J. Mason, Rep. | 58,259 | 35% | |
