= Rosalie Silber Abrams =

American politician (1916–2009)

Majority Leader of the Maryland Senate
- In office 1978–1982

Maryland State Senator
- In office 1970–1984
- Succeeded by: Barbara A. Hoffman

Member of the Maryland House of Delegates
- In office 1967–1970

Personal details
- Born: Rosalie Silber; June 2, 1916 Baltimore, Maryland, U.S.
- Died: February 27, 2009 (aged 92) Towson, Maryland, U.S.
- Spouse: William Abrams (m. 1954; died 1978)
- Children: 1
- Education: Sinai Hospital School of Nursing (RN); Columbia University; Johns Hopkins University (BS, MS)

Academic background
- Thesis: State Governmental Structure Affecting Enactment and Implementation of a Federal Program: A Case Study of Medicaid in Maryland (1969)

Rosalie Silber Abrams (June 2, 1916 – February 27, 2009) was a member of the Maryland House of Delegates (1967–70) and Maryland State Senate (1970–84). She was the first female and Jewish majority leader of the state Senate (1978–82). Appointed by Governor Harry Hughes, Abrams headed the Maryland Office on Aging (now Department of Aging) from 1983 until retiring in 1996.

== Early life ==
Rosalie Silber was born to Dora (née Rodbell) and Isaac "Ike" Silber in Baltimore, Maryland on June 2, 1916. Her mother was an immigrant from Poland and her father an immigrant from Austria. Her parents owned a bakery in East Baltimore called Silber's Bakery. She graduated from Western High School in the 1930s. She attended Sinai Hospital School of Nursing and became a registered nurse. She also attended Columbia University.

She later attended Johns Hopkins University and graduated with a Bachelor of Science in 1963 and a Master of Science in political science in 1969. Her master's thesis was State Governmental Structure Affecting Enactment and Implementation of a Federal Program: A Case Study of Medicaid in Maryland.

== Personal life ==
She married William Abrams in 1954. He died in 1978. Together, they had one daughter, Elizabeth "Lissa" Abrams.

== Career ==
During World War II, Abrams worked as a nurse in the U.S. Navy. She returned to work at Silber's Bakery in 1947 and worked there until she married in 1954. She also taught sex education classes at Patterson High School.

Abrams was elected to the Maryland House of Delegates in 1966 and served until 1970. Abrams represented Northwest Baltimore in the Maryland State Senate from 1970 until 1984.

In 1983, she was appointed by Governor Harry Hughes as the director of the Maryland Office of Aging. She served in that role until she retired in 1996.

== Death ==
Abrams died of heart failure at Gilchrist Hospice Care in Towson, Maryland on February 27, 2009.

Maryland Senate
Preceded by Roy N. Staten	Majority Leader of the Maryland Senate; 1978–1982	Succeeded by Clarence W. Blount
