= Pat Hiban =

Realtor and author (born 1965)

- Education: Frostburg State University

Patrick Hiban, also known as Pat Hiban (born in 1965), is the founder and former Chairman of Rebus University and is the former host and founder of real estate podcast Real Estate Rockstars with Pat Hiban.

Hiban is a former real estate agent out of the Baltimore area, and was the owner of the Pat Hiban Group with Keller Williams. He was named a New York Times and USA Today best selling author. Hiban was also one of the founders of GoBundance.

== Early life and education ==
Hiban and his four siblings grew up in Howard County, Maryland. His mother, Ann, was a schoolteacher. In his own words, Hiban came from "fairly humble beginnings." He didn't begin speaking until the age of 5, and was diagnosed with a learning disability as a child. Hiban's parents divorced when he was 12. According to Hiban, as a child he ostensibly didn't possess any "special talents" or "strong interest in doing anything particular." Hiban graduated from Wilde Lake High School in 1983. In 1987, he earned his sociology degree from Frostburg State University, graduating with a GPA of 2.6.

In the summer before his senior year of college, Hiban first had a "realization that [he] had a skill" when he got a new job distributing coupons for a timeshare company in Ocean City, Maryland. In his first day on the job, Hiban made more money in commissions than he typically made in an entire week at his previous job, where he worked as a meat slicer at a local deli. Hiban views this experience as a defining moment that put him on a path toward entrepreneurship.

== Career ==
Hiban established an online learning resource for realtors called Rebus University. He has hosted the podcast Real Estate Rockstars with Pat Hiban, launched in 2014. The podcast has been named as one on the best podcasts for 2018 by industry website Web4Realty (2018).

== Bibliography ==
- 6 Steps to 7 Figures: A Real Estate Professionals Guide to Building Wealth and Creating Your Destiny, 2011 ISBN 978-0998288208
- Tribe of Millionaires: What if One Choice Could Change Everything, 2019 ISBN 978-0-998-28-8222
- The Quitter's Manifesto: Quit a Job You Hate for the Work You Love, 2022 ISBN 978-1947200678

== Awards ==
- New York Times Best Selling Author
- No.1 RE/MAX Agent Worldwide in 2004.
- No.1 Keller Williams Realty Agent Worldwide in 2006
