= Maryland Legislative District 1 =

American legislative district

Maryland's legislative district 1
- Represents; Allegany County, Garrett County and part of Washington County
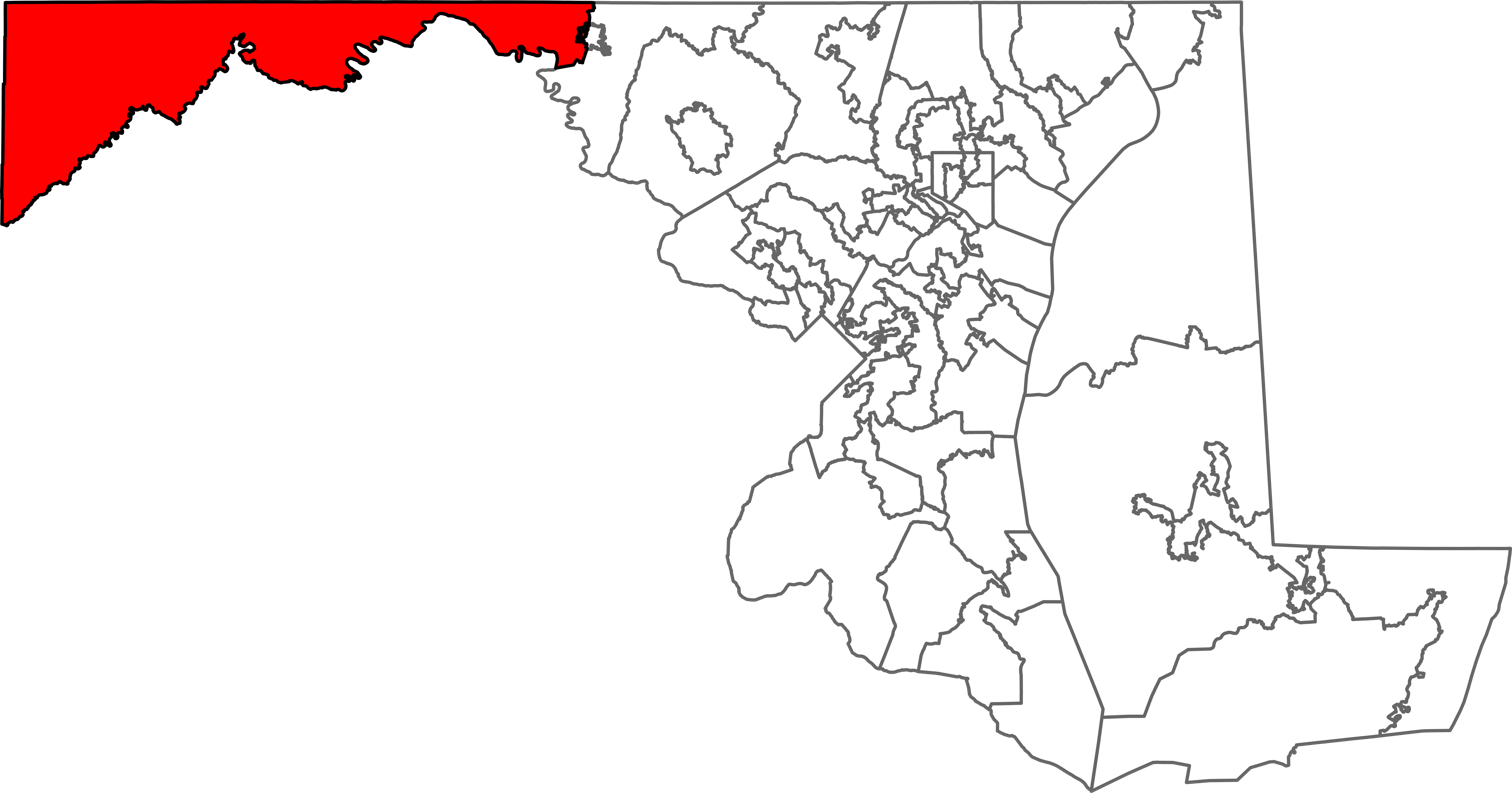
- Senator: Michael W. McKay (R)
- Delegate(s): James C. Hinebaugh Jr. (R) (District 1A); Jason C. Buckel (R) (District 1B); Terry L. Baker (R) (District 1C)
- Registration: 56.4% Republican; 25.7% Democratic; 16.4% unaffiliated
- Demographics: 88.9% White; 5.2% Black/African American; 0.2% Native American; 0.9% Asian; 0.0% Hawaiian/Pacific Islander; 0.7% Other race; 4.0% Two or more races; 1.7% Hispanic
- Population (2020): 115,613
- Voting-age population: 94,137
- Registered voters: 76,701

Maryland Legislative District 1 is one of 47 districts in the state for the Maryland General Assembly. It covers Allegany County, Garrett County and part of Washington County. The district is divided into three sub-districts for the Maryland House of Delegates: District 1A, District 1B and District 1C.

== Demographic characteristics ==
As of the 2020 United States census, the district had a population of 115,613, of whom 94,137 (81.4%) were of voting age. The racial makeup of the district was 102,833 (88.9%) White, 6,001 (5.2%) African American, 214 (0.2%) Native American, 1,041 (0.9%) Asian, 23 (0.0%) Pacific Islander, 812 (0.7%) from some other race, and 4,673 (4.0%) from two or more races. Hispanic or Latino of any race were 1,974 (1.7%) of the population.

The district had 76,701 registered voters as of October 17, 2020, of whom 12,611 (16.4%) were registered as unaffiliated, 43,241 (56.4%) were registered as Republicans, 19,686 (25.7%) were registered as Democrats, and 1,163 (1.5%) were registered to other parties.

== Political representation ==
The district is represented for the 2023–2027 legislative term in the State Senate by Michael W. McKay (R) and in the House of Delegates by James C. Hinebaugh Jr. (R, District 1A, Garrett County and part of Allegany County), Jason C. Buckel (R, District 1B, part of Allegany County) and Terry L. Baker (R, District 1C, parts of Allegany and Washington Counties).

== Election history ==
Years	Senator	Party	Electoral history
January 18, 1967 – January 13, 1971	Ronald C. Brubaker	Democratic	Elected in 1966. Lost re-election.
January 13, 1971 – January 12, 1983	Edward J. Mason	Republican	Elected in 1970. Re-elected in 1974. Re-elected in 1978. Lost renomination.
January 12, 1983 – January 9, 1991	John N. Bambacus	Republican	Elected in 1982. Re-elected in 1986. Retired.
January 9, 1991 – January 10, 2007	John J. Hafer	Republican	Elected in 1990. Re-elected in 1994. Re-elected in 1998. Re-elected in 2002. Retired.
January 10, 2007 – January 11, 2023	George C. Edwards	Republican	Elected in 2006. Re-elected in 2010. Re-elected in 2014. Re-elected in 2018. Retired.
January 11, 2023 – present	Mike McKay	Republican	Elected in 2022. Re-elected in 2026.

== Election results, 1986-present ==
=== Senate ===
Maryland general election, 2018
Party	Candidate	Votes	%	±%
Republican	George C. Edwards (incumbent)	34,966	98.3	▼0.9
Total votes		35,559	100.0	

Maryland general election, 2014
Party	Candidate	Votes	%	±%
Republican	George C. Edwards (incumbent)	30,374	99.2	▼0.1
Total votes		30,614	100.0	

Maryland general election, 2010
Party	Candidate	Votes	%	±%
Republican	George C. Edwards (incumbent)	30,012	99.3	▲26.6
Total votes		30,229	100.0	

Maryland general election, 2006
Party	Candidate	Votes	%	±%
Republican	George C. Edwards	25,365	72.7	▼26.7
Democratic	Thomas Conlon	9,489	27.2	▲27.2
Total votes		34,873	100.0	

Maryland general election, 2002
Party	Candidate	Votes	%	±%
Republican	John J. Hafer (incumbent)	29,602	99.4	▼0.6
Total votes		29,782	100.0	

Maryland general election, 1998
Party	Candidate	Votes	%	±%
Republican	John J. Hafer (incumbent)	20,552	100.0	▲29.0
Total votes		29,782	100.0	

Maryland general election, 1994
Party	Candidate	Votes	%	±%
Republican	John J. Hafer (incumbent)	20,496	71	▲12
Democratic	Edward A. Malloy Jr.	8,209	29	▼12
Total votes		28,705	100.0	

Maryland general election, 1990
Party	Candidate	Votes	%	±%
Republican	John J. Hafer	14,397	59	▼41
Democratic	Daniel F. McMullen	10,126	41	▲41
Total votes		24,523	100.0	

Maryland general election, 1986
Party	Candidate	Votes	%
Republican	John N. Bambacus	16,370	100
Total votes		16,370	100.0

== See also ==
- Maryland House of Delegates District 1A
- Maryland House of Delegates District 1B
- Maryland House of Delegates District 1C
