= John N. Bambacus =

American politician

Mayor of Frostburg, Maryland
- In office 1994–2002
- Succeeded by: James Cotton

Member of the Maryland Senate from the 1st district
- In office 1983 – January 9, 1991
- Preceded by: Edward J. Mason
- Succeeded by: John J. Hafer

Personal details
- Born: May 28, 1945 (age 81) Washington, D.C., U.S.
- Party: Republican

John N. Bambacus (born May 28, 1945) is an American politician, and represented District 1 in the Maryland Senate, which covers Garrett, Allegany, and Washington Counties.

== Education ==
Bambacus attended Montgomery Junior College, then Frostburg State College where he got his B.S. in 1970. In 1972, he received his M.S. degree from West Virginia University. Finally, he was a PhD candidate at the University of Maryland from 1972 until 1975.

== Career ==
Before college, Bambacus served in the U.S. Marine Corps during the Vietnam War from 1964 until 1967, achieving the rank of Sergeant.

After serving in the military and getting his degree, he began his career as a political science professor at Frostburg State College (now Frostburg State University). In 1979, he became a Special Assistant to U.S. Senator Charles Mathias Jr., serving him from 1979 until 1982, when he ran for state senator and won.

After a brief hiatus from politics, Bambacus was elected mayor of Frostburg, MD in 1994 and served 4 terms. In 2002 Bambacus was a candidate for Clerk of Court of Allegany County where he was overwhelmingly defeated in the Republican primary by Dawne Lindsey (76.3 to 20.5). He still plays a role behind the scenes and voices his opinion on current issues.

== Election results ==
- 1986 Race for Maryland State Senate – District 1

Name	Votes	Percent	Outcome
John N. Bambacus, Rep.	16,370	100%	Won
Unopposed
