= Roy N. Staten =

American politician (1913–1999)

Member of the Maryland Senate from the 8th district
- In office 1975–1978
- Preceded by: Robert L. Dalton and Julian L. Lapides
- Succeeded by: Patrick T. Welsh

Member of the Maryland Senate from the 13th district
- In office 1967–1974
- Preceded by: District established
- Succeeded by: John Carroll Coolahan

Member of the Maryland House of Delegates
- In office 1954–1966

Personal details
- Born: Roy Neville Staten; 1913
- Died: December 11, 1999 (aged 85–86) Dundalk, Maryland, U.S.
- Resting place: Oak Lawn Cemetery; Baltimore, Maryland, U.S.
- Party: Democratic
- Spouse: Mary D. Caldwell
- Children: 2
- Occupation: Politician

Roy Neville Staten (1913 – December 11, 1999) was a politician from Virginia. He served as a member of the Maryland House of Delegates from 1954 to 1966 and as a member of the Maryland Senate from 1967 to 1978, representing District 13 from 1967 to 1974 and District 8 from 1975 to 1978.

== Early life ==
Roy Neville Staten was born in 1913. He was a native of Virginia.

== Career ==
Staten worked as a chauffeur of Governor Albert Ritchie during his last campaign in the late 1930s. He also served in the United States Army.

Staten was a Democrat. He started working for the Maryland House of Delegates in 1954, representing Baltimore County. In 1954, Staten was appointed as a delegate. He served from 1954 to 1966. In 1966, the legislative districts were divided. In 1967, Staten became the first senator to represent Dundalk, Maryland. He represented District 13 from 1967 to 1974. He represented District 8 from 1975 to 1978. He retired in 1979. While senator, Staten pushed for the construction of the Francis Scott Key Bridge and a kindergarten program in Baltimore County Public Schools. Staten worked as senate majority leader from 1975 to 1977.

Staten also worked in the accounting department at Bethlehem Steel's Sparrows Point Shipyard. Staten was a founder of Dundalk Community College.

== Personal life ==
Staten married Mary D. Caldwell. He had two daughters, Elsie and Yvonne. He lived on Dungalow Road in Dundalk prior to moving into a nursing facility.

Staten died on December 11, 1999, following heart problems at Meridian Genesis Nursing Center in Dundalk. He was interred at Oak Lawn Cemetery in Baltimore.

== Legacy ==
The Roy N. Staten Center for Business and Industry at Dundalk Community College was dedicated to Staten.

Maryland Senate
Preceded by George Snyder	Majority Leader of the Maryland Senate; 1975–1977	Succeeded by Rosalie Silber Abrams
