= Staten, West Virginia =

Unincorporated community in West Virginia, US

Coordinates: 38°52′13″N 81°02′56″W

Staten is an unincorporated community in Calhoun County, in the U.S. state of West Virginia.

== History ==
A post office called Staten was established in 1888, and remained in operation until 1966. The community was named after Staten Island, New York.
