= Staten Run =

Stream in West Virginia, U.S.

Coordinates: 38°11′06″N 81°19′27″W

Staten Run is a stream in the U.S. state of West Virginia.

Staten Run was named after James Staten, a pioneer who was killed by indigenous Americans.

== See also ==
- List of rivers of West Virginia
