= George C. Edwards =

American politician

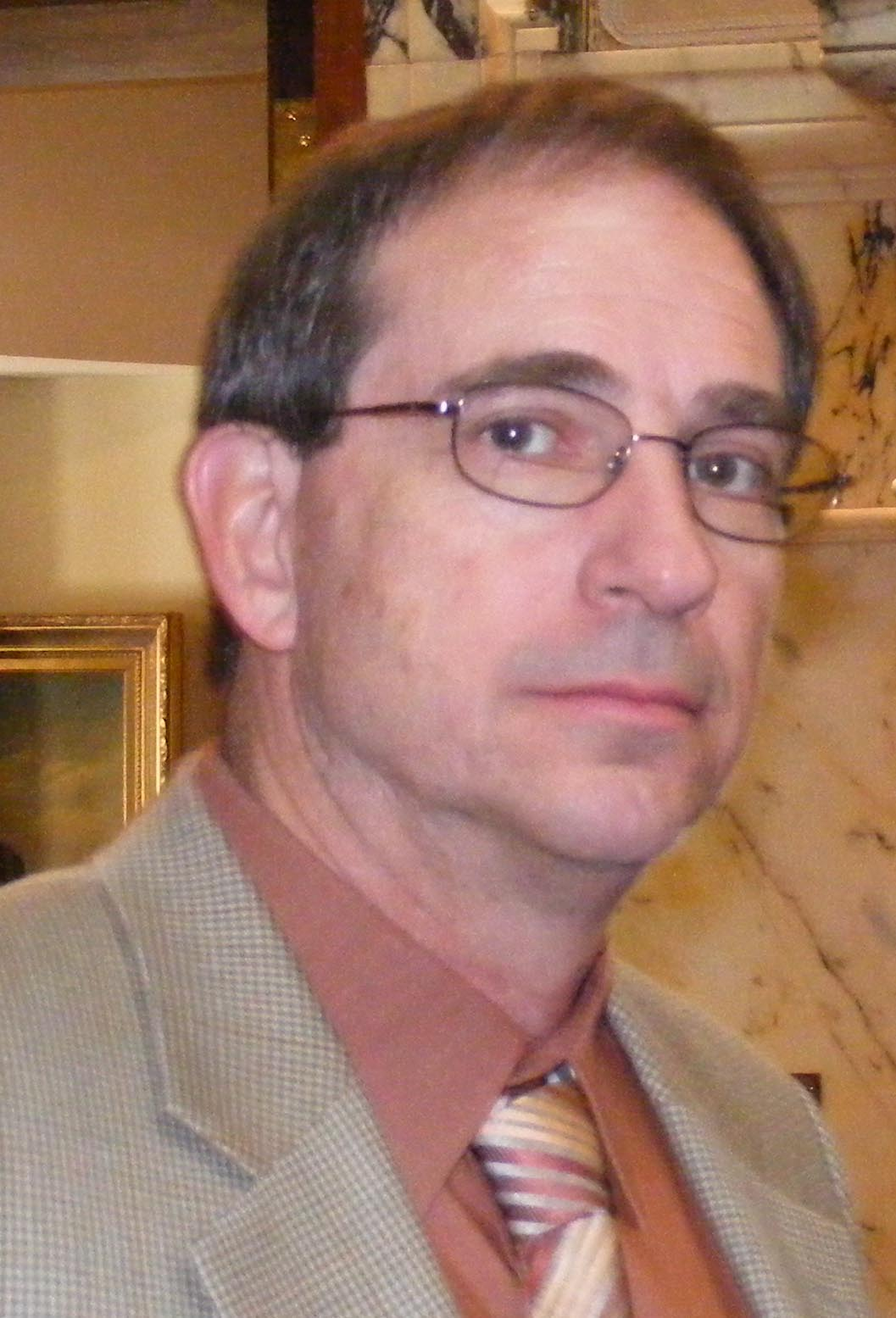
- Edwards in 2008

Member of the Maryland Senate from the 1st district
- In office January 10, 2007 – January 11, 2023
- Preceded by: John J. Hafer
- Succeeded by: Mike McKay

Minority Leader of the Maryland House of Delegates
- In office January 8, 2003 – January 10, 2007
- Preceded by: Al Redmer
- Succeeded by: Tony O'Donnell

Member of the Maryland House of Delegates from the 1A district
- In office January 12, 1983 – January 10, 2007
- Preceded by: DeCorsey E. Bolden
- Succeeded by: Wendell Beitzel

Personal details
- Born: George Clayton Edwards; April 9, 1948 (age 78) Grantsville, Maryland, U.S.
- Party: Republican
- Education: Fairmont State University (BS)

George Clayton Edwards (born April 9, 1948) is an American politician who previously served as a member of the Maryland Senate from District 1.

== Background ==
Edwards was elected as the State Senator for Maryland District 1 in 2006, which covers Garrett County and parts of Washington and Allegany counties. He defeated Thomas Conlon, both of whom ran for the seat vacated by John J. Hafer who retired after 16 years in the State Senate.

== Education ==
Edwards attended Northern High School in Accident, Maryland. He received his Bachelor of Science in business administration from Fairmont State College, cum laude in 1970. He later attended Frostburg State University to get his teacher's certificate.

== Career ==
After college, Edwards was drafted by the Baltimore Colts. He served in the National Guard for six years. He has been active in Garrett County Economic Development Corporation and the Maryland Association of Counties.

Edwards was first elected to the Maryland House of Delegates in 1982 and served for 24 years before running and winning the State Senate seat. As a member of the House of Delegates, Edwards was the Minority Leader from 2003 to 2007.

Serving in the Maryland Senate since 2007, Edwards announced in July 2021 that he would not seek reelection in 2022.

He is a member of the National Rifle Association, the Lions Club, the American Legion, and the Fraternal Order of Police.

== Legislative record ==
In 2016, legislation was introduced in the Maryland Senate (SB 361) that would require the disclosure of fracking chemicals during a liability suit involving harm or injury to persons from gas drilling and fracking operations. The bill also required higher insurance coverage for gas companies. Edwards introduced amendments that would reduce the liability insurance requirements and limit chemical disclosure. After several days of public outcry from his district, including letters and emails from more than 350 citizens and businesses, Edwards withdrew the amendments. The final bill passed out of the Senate.

In October 2021, he was one of five Maryland state legislators from Garrett, Allegany and Washington counties who sent a pair of letters to West Virginia officials asking about annexation of Western Maryland to West Virginia. These letters where denounced by the Allegany County Board of Commissioners President Jake Shade (who was also running against one of the lawmakers in the primaries), calling the request a political stunt, an embarrassment and unneeded distraction. Following criticism from local officials and some constituents, Edwards and Delegate Jason Buckel issued a letter withdrawing support for the secession proposal.

== Election results ==
- 2006 Race for Maryland State Senate – District 1

Name	Votes	Percent	Outcome
George C. Edwards, Rep.	25,365	72.7%	Won
Thomas Conlon, Dem.	9,489	27.2%	Lost
Other Write-Ins	19	0.1%	Lost

- 2002 Race for Maryland House of Delegates – District 1A

Name	Votes	Percent	Outcome
George C. Edwards, Rep.	10,303	99.4%	Won
Other Write-Ins	58	0.6%	Lost

- 1998 Race for Maryland House of Delegates – District 1A

Name	Votes	Percent	Outcome
George C. Edwards, Rep.	7,999	83%	Won
Lawson L. Duckworth, Dem.	1,670	17%	Lost

- 1994 Race for Maryland House of Delegates – District 1A

Name	Votes	Percent	Outcome
George C. Edwards, Rep.	8,155	100%	Won

- 1990 Race for Maryland House of Delegates – District 1A

Name	Votes	Percent	Outcome
George C. Edwards, Rep.	5,506	100%	Won

- 1986 Race for Maryland House of Delegates – District 1A

Name	Votes	Percent	Outcome
George C. Edwards, Rep.	5,648	100%	Won

=== Legislative notes ===
- Voted against the Healthy Air Act in 2006 (SB154)
- Voted for slots in 2005 (HB1361)
- Voted for electric deregulation in 1999 (HB703)
- Voted for income tax reduction in 1998 (SB750)[
