= Wendell Beitzel =

American politician (born 1943)

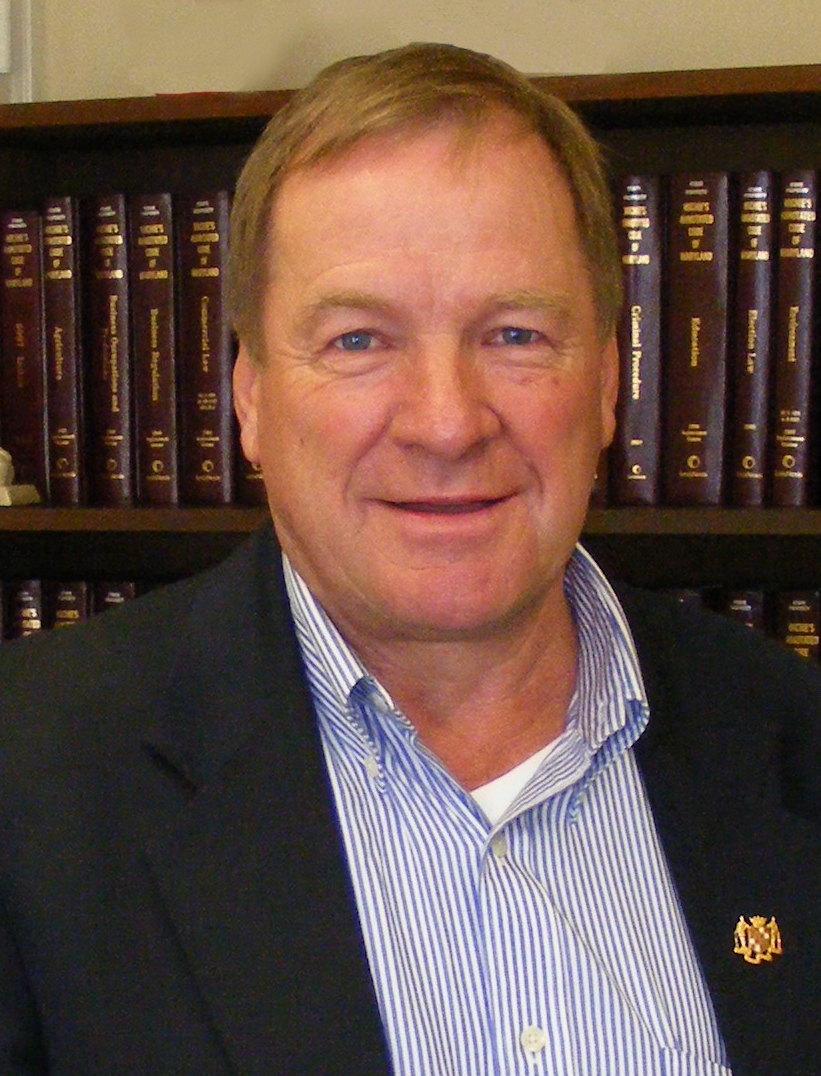

Member of the Maryland House of Delegates from the 1A district
- In office January 10, 2007 – January 11, 2023
- Preceded by: George C. Edwards
- Succeeded by: Jim Hinebaugh

Member of the Garrett County Board of Commissioners, District 3
- In office 1998–2002
- Preceded by: Roger P. Glotfelty
- Succeeded by: David C. Beard

Personal details
- Born: Wendell Roy Beitzel; January 17, 1943 (age 83) Accident, Maryland, U.S.
- Party: Republican
- Education: Fairmont State University (BS); Frostburg State University (MS, MBA)
- Military career
- Allegiance: United States
- Branch: United States Army
- Service years: 1965–1968

Wendell Roy Beitzel (born January 17, 1943) is an American Republican politician from Maryland. He served in the Maryland House of Delegates, representing District 1A which covers Garrett and Allegany counties, from January 2007 to January 2023.

== Education ==
Beitzel graduated from Fairmont State College in 1964 with a bachelor's degree in biology. He has also received a master's degree in management and an MBA from Frostburg State University.

== Career ==
Beitzel served in the U.S. Army from 1965 to 1968. He was a microbiologist for the National Institute of Health from 1968 to 1971. He was part owner of the Point View Inn & Motel from 1973 to 1978, the Starlite Motel & Restaurant from 1978 to 1983, and the Point View Inn & Motel from 1981 to 2003. When Beitzel Enterprise existed as a company that controlled public accommodation services, he served as President of Beitzel Enterprises, Inc. He served as the Assistant Director of Environmental Health at the Garrett County Health Department from 1971 to 1981.

In 1981, he assumed the position as administrator for the Garrett County Sanitary District until 1998, he started focusing more on his owned businesses. He has been a farmer since 1983, and was also a Director of Infrastructure Development, D.C. Development LLC, 2003 to 2006. Beitzel served a term as a Garrett County commissioner from 1998 to 2002.

Beitzel became a Maryland State Delegate in 2007 after the 2006 election. He was first appointed to the Health and Government Operations Committee in 2007, but was relocated to the Appropriations Committee in 2009 - where he currently sits as a member. He is part of the Capital Budget Subcommittee, Transportation and the Environment Subcommittee, and the Personnel Oversight Committee - all part of the Appropriations Committee.

In August 2021, he announced he would not seek a fifth term to the House of Delegates in 2022.

In October 2021, he was one of five Maryland state legislators from Garrett, Allegany and Washington counties who sent a pair of letters to West Virginia officials asking about annexation of Western Maryland to West Virginia. These letters caused a local uproar, with Allegany County officials calling the request a political stunt, an embarrassment and unneeded distraction.

Following criticism from local officials and some constituents, Delegate Jason Buckel and State Senator George Edwards issued a letter withdrawing support for the secession proposal.

=== Rural legacy ===
Beitzel was the subject of criticism in 2011 when he received $427,000 in state funds for agreeing not to develop farm land he owned. The deal actually cost the state of Maryland $455,000, since they also contributed fees for appraisal and other professional services, totaling $28,000.00. The property in question was a farm owned by Wendell and Ruth Beitzel near Accident, Maryland, which they acquired around 2007.

Beitzel submitted an application to the Board of County Commissioners to establish an Agricultural District for a farm they own on Accident-Bittner Road for the purpose of seeking conservation easements utilizes the Maryland Rural Legacy Program. The Beitzel application was approved on February 6, 2008, by the Garrett County Planning Commission and by the Agricultural Preservation Advisory Board on February 28, 2008. The Board of Garrett County Commissioners approved the application April 29, 2008.

The Beitzel application was then submitted with 5 others to the Maryland Agricultural Land Preservation Foundation by the Garrett County Department of Planning and Land Development on April 30, 2008. After approved by the creation of an Agricultural Preservation district by the Garrett County Commissioners, Beitzel submitted an application to participate in the Garrett County Bear Creek Rural Legacy Program to convey development rights to the property in exchange for payment to be determined by appraisal.

The administration of the program, started by the Maryland Department of Natural Resources, ordered three appraisals. After assessment of the easement, Beitzel was offered $427,000 for the conservation easement on January 12, 2009. Beitzel accepted the offer on January 28, 2009. It took several years before the transaction was finally approved by DNR while two other applications were being processed. After being informed that the application was approved by the DNR for settlement in 2011, Beitzel informed Mr. Williams A Somerville, Ethics Advisor for the Maryland General Assembly Joint Committee and Legislative Ethics of the pending transaction and asked for a review of the easement to avoid any appearance of a conflict of interest before and to ensure appropriate disclosure before requesting final approval by the Board of Public Works for Maryland. In addition, the Delegate submitted Form B&D Disclosure of Interest to the Joint Committee on Legislative Ethics.

The Beitzel application was approved by unanimous vote of the Board of Public Works and the sale of the conservation easement was finalized in 2011.

=== Positions on legislation ===
In March 2014, Beitzel voted against raising the state minimum wage from $7.25/hour to $10.10/hour. The House of Delegates voted 89 to 46 in favor of the legislation. Beitzel spoke out against the wage increase, stating the bill would harm small business owners and cause them to go out of business.

In 2016, Beitzel opposed legislation that would prohibit carrying firearms and deadly weapons on Maryland college campuses. Betizel had concerns that the legislation would impact hunters who might inadvertently travel on university property with a firearm in their vehicle.

Beitzel has sponsored several pieces of legislation related to Deep Creek Lake, a major reservoir in his district, including bills that would allow landowners to purchase contiguous property and a plan to provide funding for state-owned lakes such as Deep Creek.

=== Marcellus Shale natural gas development ===
Beitzel said he has been supporting the practice for drilling and as a landowner served to gain from drilling. "I've been criticized from potentially benefiting financially from (drilling)", said Beitzel, who added he would not benefit any more than those who had Marcellus Shale under their property.

In March 2015 the Maryland Legislature debated a bill, HB449, that would provide for a three-year period to study the health effects of fracking. A panel of experts would study the environmental and public health risks of hydraulic fracturing. Supporting the gas industry's concerns about the bill, Beitzel expressed opposition to the bill and has argued repeatedly that additional studies and regulations would deter gas development in Western Maryland and was not business friendly. Beitzel offered several amendments to the bill which failed on the House floor before a final veto-proof vote in favor of the health study and moratorium. In the end, Beitzel was part of the 103 House members who voted for and helped pass the legislation.

In a WCBC radio interview posted online on April 9, 2015, Beitzel further explained his opposition to creating the panel of health experts by stating "The makeup of the panel was created in such a fashion that I felt it was just so slanted to the one side that they would get the results they wanted". He finally voted for a version of the bill that did not include public health considerations, stating in an interview on WCBC radio about the final bill "it was not really a bill that was going to cause a whole lot of harm".

The fracking issue intensified in the legislature in 2017 when two bills to ban fracking in Maryland were introduced in both the House and Senate.

Beitzel was quoted in The Washington Post as saying "If you don't have property with natural gas, then you have nothing to gain from it, and it's easier to be opposed to it". He further suggested that he would not benefit from fracking because "he does not own the gas rights for his own property, much of which is off-limits to drilling because it is either designated for agricultural preservation or located within one of the watersheds that would be protected under the state's proposed regulations."

The Washington Post did a follow-up story on the issue when opposition accused Beitzel of a conflict of interest, which he presented to the Maryland Ethics Council in 2011 to assure the public there was no act of wrongdoing. The question of his conservation easements was raised again, along with his former comments which had led many to conclude that he was not disclosing that he stood to benefit financially if he chose to lease his land for drilling. "I can only lease that land for agricultural purposes and other uses that are not restricted by the conservation easement," he explained the preceding month. Beitzel later provided clarifying remarks and the Post included a copy of a legislative ethics committee report on the matter.

Regardless of Beitzel's stance on the development of natural gas in Western Maryland, his support has become obsolete since both bodies of the General Assembly passed legislation to ban the process of hydraulic fracturing (House Bill 1325/Senate Bill 740). Governor Hogan's support for a ban on hydraulic fracturing and approval to sign the bill into law prevented a proposed moratorium, which would have allowed each county to vote whether or not the residents of that county wanted to ban the practice.

=== Affiliation with conservative organizations ===
In February 2017, Beitzel was recognized by the American Conservative Union for his "commitment to upholding conservative principles through their voting records during the 2016 legislative session."

=== Election results ===
- 2006 race for Maryland House of Delegates – District 01A

Voters to choose one:

Name	Votes	Percent	Outcome
Wendell R. Beitzel, Rep.	6,985	56.3%	Won
Bill Aiken, Dem.	5,406	43.5%	Lost

== Post politics ==
In January 2023 Garrett College renamed its career technology training center to honor Beitzel in recognition of his efforts towards its creation.
