= Maryland Legislative District 47 =

American legislative district

Maryland's legislative district 47
- Represents part of Prince George's County
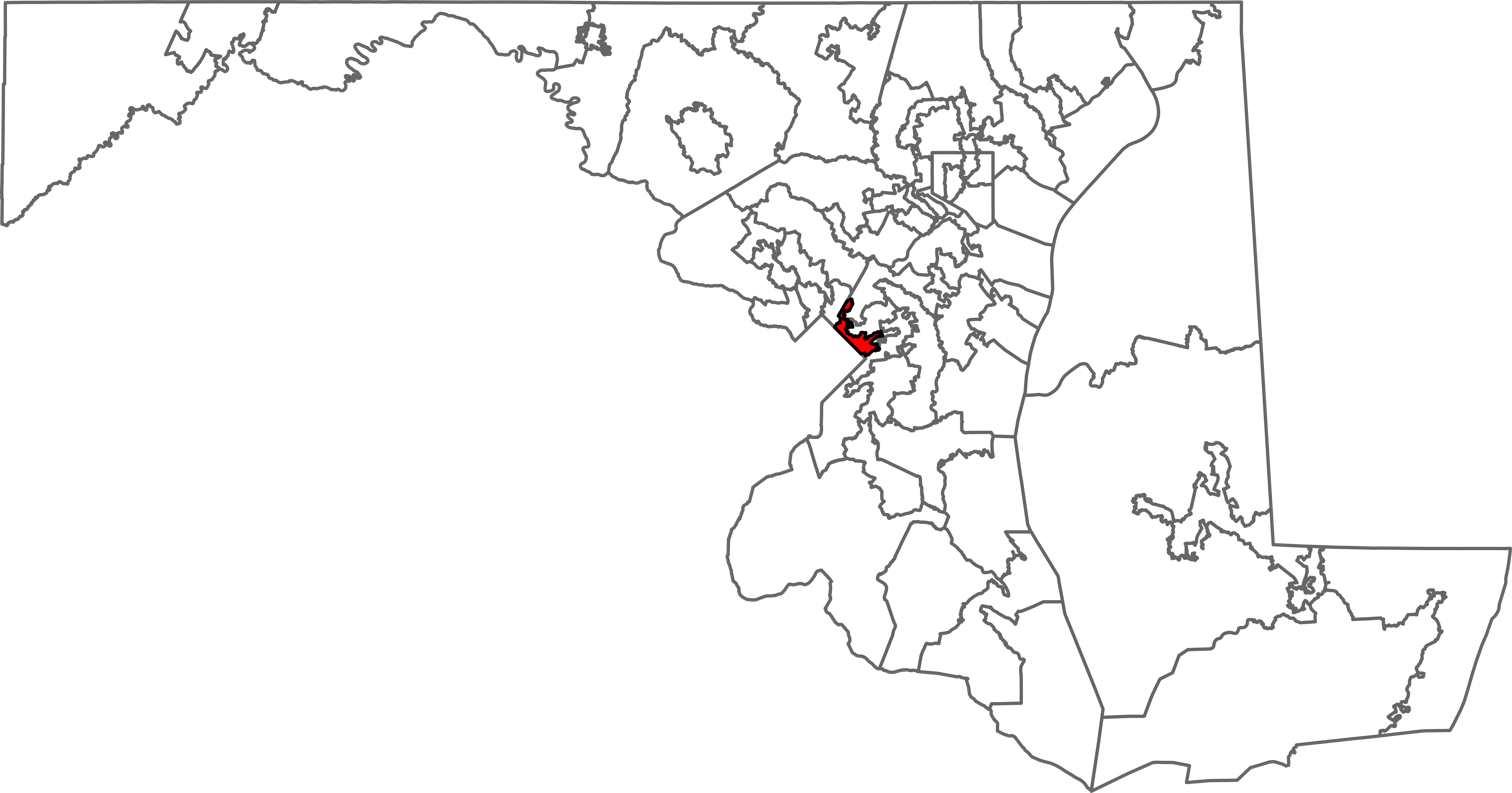
- Senator: Malcolm Augustine (D)
- Delegate(s): Diana M. Fennell (D) (District 47A); Julian Ivey (D) (District 47A); Deni Taveras (D) (District 47B)
- Registration: 78.5% Democratic; 5.3% Republican; 13.5% unaffiliated
- Demographics: 9.5% White; 40.1% Black/African American; 2.2% Native American; 2.3% Asian; 0.0% Hawaiian/Pacific Islander; 35.1% Other race; 10.7% Two or more races; 49.4% Hispanic
- Population (2020): 135,884
- Voting-age population: 101,771
- Registered voters: 56,322

Maryland Legislative District 47 is the one of 47 districts in the state for the Maryland General Assembly. It covers part of Prince George's County. The district is divided into two sub-districts for the Maryland House of Delegates: District 47A and District 47B.

Voters in this district select three delegates every four years to represent them in the Maryland House of Delegates.

== Demographic characteristics ==
As of the 2020 United States census, the district had a population of 135,884, of whom 101,771 (74.9%) were of voting age. The racial makeup of the district was 12,925 (9.5%) White, 54,470 (40.1%) African American, 3,030 (2.2%) Native American, 3,081 (2.3%) Asian, 17 (0.0%) Pacific Islander, 47,656 (35.1%) from some other race, and 14,606 (10.7%) from two or more races. Hispanic or Latino of any race were 67,124 (49.4%) of the population.

The district had 56,322 registered voters as of October 17, 2020, of whom 7,622 (13.5%) were registered as unaffiliated, 2,971 (5.3%) were registered as Republicans, 44,211 (78.5%) were registered as Democrats, and 1,231 (2.2%) were registered to other parties.

== Political representation ==
The district is represented for the 2023–2027 legislative term in the State Senate by Malcolm Augustine (D) and in the House of Delegates by Diana M. Fennell (D, District 47A), Julian Ivey (D, District 47A) and Deni Taveras (D, District 47B).
