= Maryland House of Delegates District 1A =

American legislative district

Maryland's legislative district 1A
- Represents; Garrett County, part of Allegany County
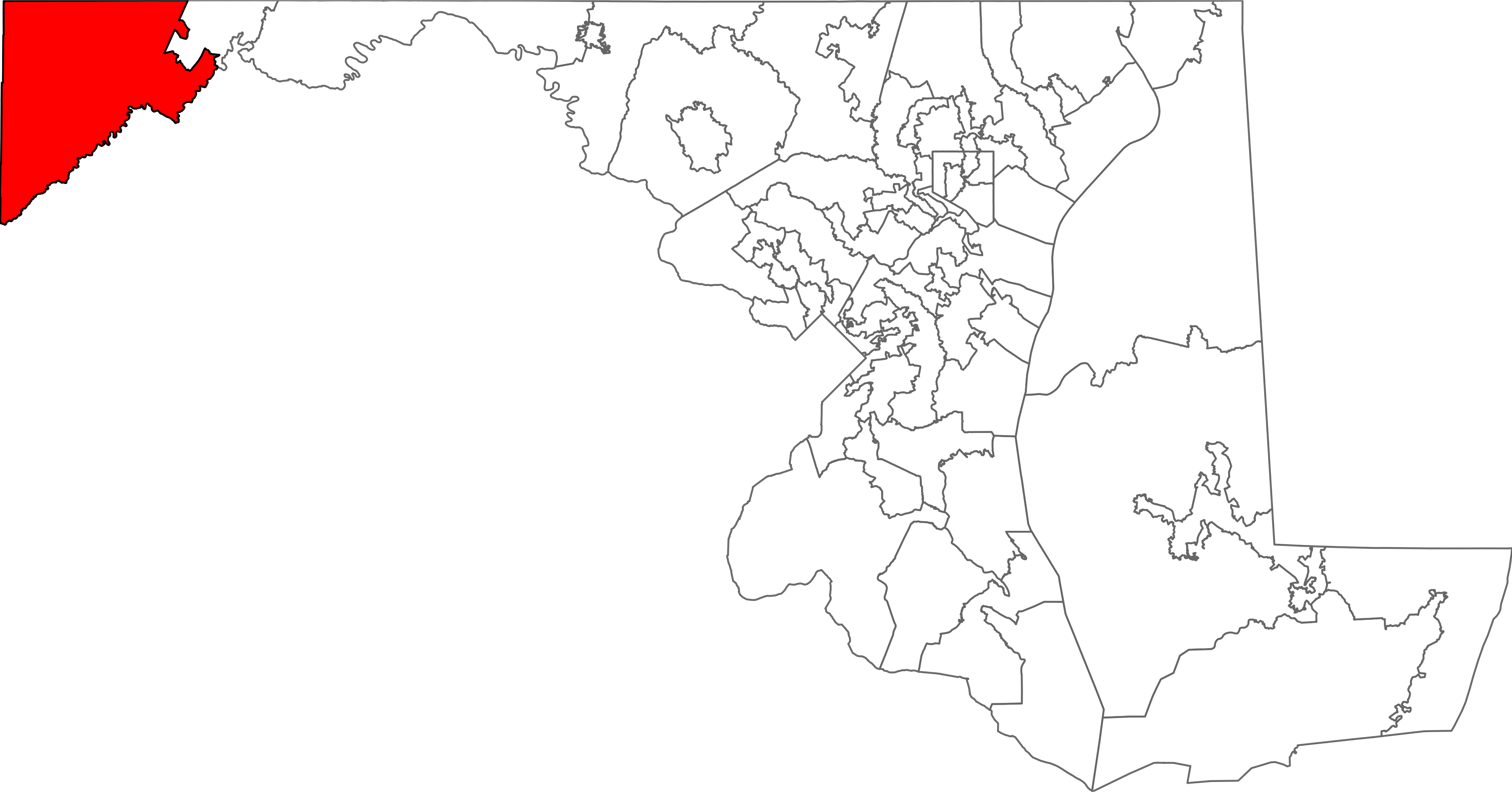
- Delegate(s): Jim Hinebaugh (R)
- Registration: 64.6% Republican; 20.5% Democratic; 13.7% unaffiliated
- Demographics: 95.4% White; 0.8% Black/African American; 0.1% Native American; 0.4% Asian; 0.0% Hawaiian/Pacific Islander; 0.4% Other race; 2.9% Two or more races; 1.1% Hispanic
- Population (2020): 38,903
- Voting-age population: 31,377
- Registered voters: 27,037

Maryland House of Delegates District 1A is one of the 71 districts that compose the Maryland House of Delegates. Along with subdistricts 1B and 1C, it makes up the 1st district of the Maryland Senate. Situated on the state's western border, District 1A includes all of Garrett County, and a small portion of Allegany County. It is represented by one delegate. Since 2023, it has been represented by Jim Hinebaugh, a Republican.

== Demographic characteristics ==
As of the 2020 United States census, the district had a population of 38,903, of whom 31,377 (80.7%) were of voting age. The racial makeup of the district was 37,120 (95.4%) White, 302 (0.8%) African American, 42 (0.1%) Native American, 155 (0.4%) Asian, 12 (0.0%) Pacific Islander, 157 (0.4%) from some other race, and 1,120 (2.9%) from two or more races. Hispanic or Latino of any race were 421 (1.1%) of the population.

The district had 27,037 registered voters as of October 17, 2020, of whom 3,693 (13.7%) were registered as unaffiliated, 17,456 (64.6%) were registered as Republicans, 5,534 (20.5%) were registered as Democrats, and 205 (0.8%) were registered to other parties.

== Past election results ==
=== 1982 ===
Name	Party	Outcome
George C. Edwards	Republican	Won
Andrew E. Mance	Democratic	Lost

=== 1998 ===
Name	Party	Votes	Percent	Outcome
George C. Edwards	Republican	7,999	82.7%	Won
Lawson L. Duckworth	Democratic	1,670	17.3%	Lost

=== 2002 ===
Name	Party	Votes	Percent	Outcome
George C. Edwards	Republican	10,303	99.4%	Won
Other Write-Ins		58	0.6%	

=== 2006 ===
Name	Party	Votes	Percent	Outcome
Wendell R. Beitzel	Republican	6,985	56.3%	Won
Bill Aiken	Democratic	5,406	43.5%	Lost
Other Write-Ins		24	0.2%	

=== 2010 ===
Name	Party	Votes	Percent	Outcome
Wendell R. Beitzel	Republican	8,866	72.6%	Won
James R. "Smokey" Stanton	Democratic	3,333	27.3%	Lost
Other Write-Ins		17	0.1%	

=== 2014 ===
Name	Party	Votes	Percent	Outcome
Wendell R. Beitzel	Republican	10,637	99.1%	Won
Other Write-Ins		100	0.9%	

=== 2018 ===
Name	Party	Votes	Percent	Outcome
Wendell R. Beitzel	Republican	11,149	77.6%	Won
Michael Dreisbach	Democratic	3,190	22.2%	Lost
Other Write-Ins		21	0.1%	

=== 2022 ===
Primary results by precinct Hinebaugh: 40–50%; 50–60%; 60–70%; 70–80%; Thomas: 40–50%

Republican primary results
Party	Candidate	Votes	%
Republican	Jim Hinebaugh Jr.	3,900	58.5
Republican	Tim Thomas	2,184	32.7
Republican	Andy Adams	488	7.3
Republican	Kenneth Linn Sisk	98	1.5

Democratic primary results
Party	Candidate	Votes	%
Democratic	Robert Spear	1,422	100.0

Results by precinct Hinebaugh: 50–60%; 60–70%; 70–80%; 80–90%; >90%

General Election results
Party	Candidate	Votes	%
Republican	Jim Hinebaugh Jr.	11,971	77.25%
Democratic	Robert Spear	2,829	18.26%
Libertarian	Monique M. Mehring	671	4.33%
Write-in		25	0.16%
Total votes		15,496	100.00%
Republican hold			

== List of delegates ==
Delegate	Party	Years	Electoral history
George C. Edwards	Republican	January 1983 – January 10, 2007	Elected in 1982. Retired to successfully run for the Maryland Senate in 2006.
Wendell R. Beitzel	Republican	January 10, 2007 – January 11, 2023	Elected in 2006. Retired in 2022.
Jim Hinebaugh	Republican	January 11, 2023 – present	Elected in 2022.
