= Julian L. Lapides =

American politician (1931–2021)

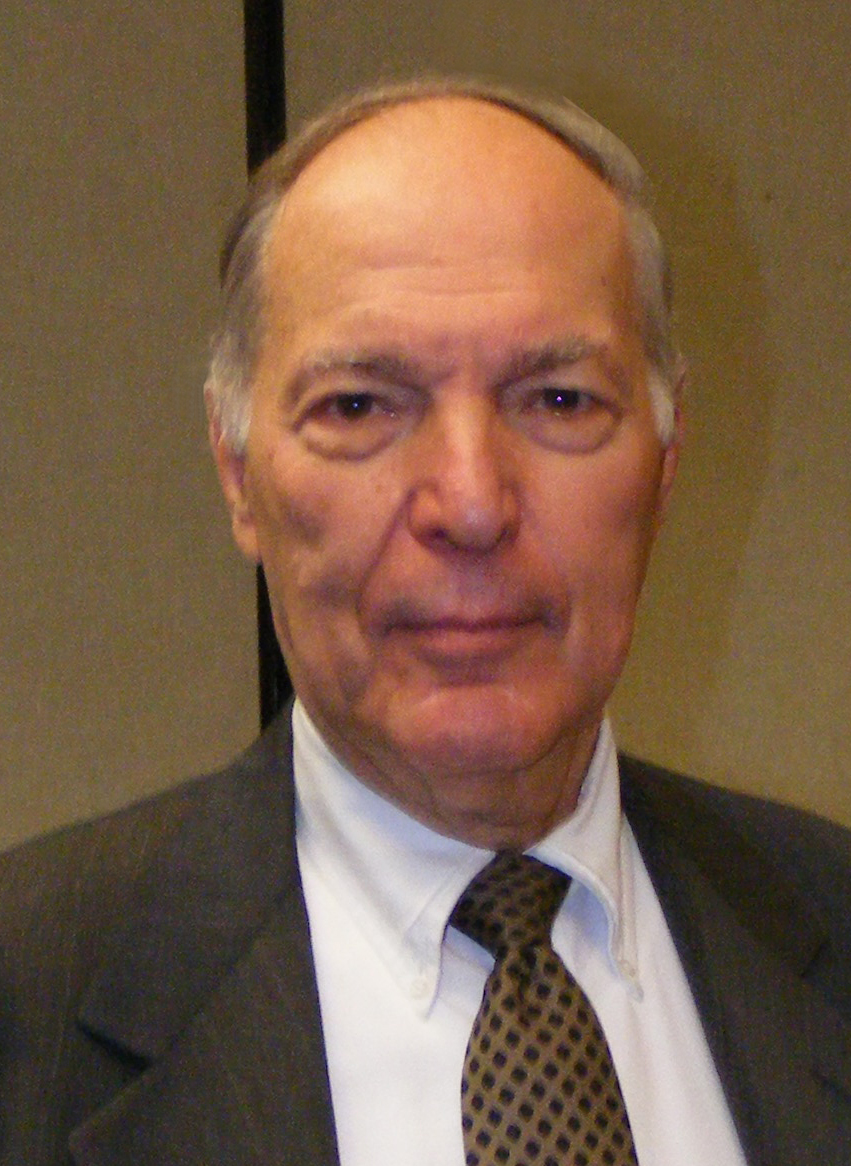

Member of the Maryland Senate
- In office January 11, 1967 – January 11, 1995
- Constituency: 8th, 39th and 44th Legislative Districts of Baltimore City

Member of the Maryland House of Delegates from the Baltimore City 2 district
- In office January 9, 1963 – January 11, 1967
- Preceded by: Multi-member district
- Succeeded by: Multi-member district

Personal details
- Born: September 17, 1931 Baltimore, Maryland, U.S.
- Died: July 14, 2021 (aged 89) Baltimore, Maryland, U.S.
- Party: Democratic
- Spouse: Linda
- Education: Towson State College (BS); University of Maryland (LLB)

Military service
- Branch/service: United States Army

Julian L. Lapides (September 17, 1931 – July 14, 2021) was an American politician who served in the Maryland House of Delegates from 1963 to 1967 and in the Maryland Senate from 1967 to 1995. Known to his friends and colleagues as "Jack", Lapides was often called the conscience of the Maryland State Senate. He later served as a member of the Maryland State Ethics Commission.

== Early life and education ==
Born in Baltimore, Maryland, on September 17, 1931, Lapides attended Baltimore public schools and graduated from the Baltimore City College high school in 1949. He attended Johns Hopkins University and then Towson State College (now Towson University) where he earned his B.S. degree in 1954. After two years in the United States Army, Lapides was accepted at the University of Maryland Francis King Carey School of Law, where he earned his LL.B., in 1961. Lapides was admitted to the Maryland Bar in 1965. Forty years after receiving his law degree, Lapides earned a Masters of Liberal Arts degree (MLA) from Johns Hopkins University.

== Career ==
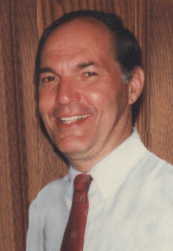
Lapides in 1986

Lapides was elected to the Maryland House of Delegates in 1962, in 1966 he won his seat in the Maryland Senate, where he served until 1994 when redistricting caused him to lose the district he had served for 28 years. While in the Senate, he chaired the Joint Budget and Audit Committee and the Joint Committee on Legislative Ethics. He was a member of the Budget and Taxation Committee and the Public Safety, Transportation, Economic Development & Natural Resources Subcommittees. On March 31, 1987, Lapides led a filibuster in the Senate aimed at killing a state plan to build 2 new stadiums in downtown Baltimore.. The filibuster failed and the Maryland General Assembly ultimately approved plans for what are now M&T Bank Stadium and Oriole Park at Camden Yards.

Lapides was also a member of the Capital Budget Subcommittee, Pensions Subcommittee, the Legislative Policy Committee, and several other subcommittees and task forces.

Lapides was a contributor to and a member of the Maryland State Arts Council, past president of Baltimore Heritage, the American Antiquarian Society, the Peale Museum, the Baltimore Museum of Art, the Walters Art Museum and Victorian Society in America. He was a life member of the NAACP, past President of the Maryland Kidney Foundation, Regional vice-president of the National Kidney Foundation (1970–72).

He died of cancer on July 14, 2021, in Baltimore, Maryland, at age 89.
