= Diana M. Fennell =

American politician (born 1967)

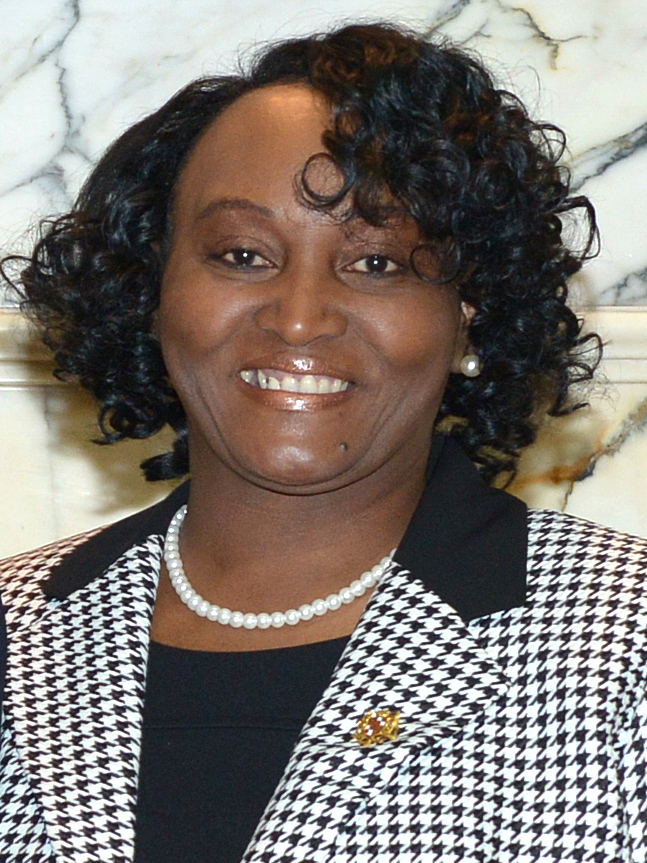

Member of the Maryland House of Delegates from the 47A district
- Incumbent
- Assumed office January 14, 2015 Serving with Jimmy Tarlau and Julian Ivey
- Preceded by: Michael G. Summers

Mayor of Colmar Manor, Maryland
- In office 2000–2010
- Preceded by: Michael L. Garrett
- Succeeded by: Michael E. Hale

Member of the Colmar Manor Town Council
- In office 1995–2000

Personal details
- Born: August 6, 1967 (age 58) Emporia, Virginia
- Party: Democratic
- Spouse(s): Jeffrey T. Fennell Sr.,
- Children: Jeffrey Jr. and DeJanee

Diana M. Fennell (born August 6, 1967) is an American politician who represents District 47A in the Maryland House of Delegates. She previously served as the mayor of Colmar Manor, Maryland from 2000 to 2010 and as a member of the Colmar Manor town council from 1995 to 2000.

== Background ==
Fennell was born on August 6, 1967, in Emporia, Virginia, where she graduated from Greensville County High School. In 2004, she attended the Academy for Excellence in Local Governance at the University of Maryland, College Park School of Public Policy.

Fennell moved from Washington, D.C. to Colmar Manor, Maryland in the early 1990s. In 1994, a neighbor urged her to seek public office. She successfully ran for Colmar Manor town council and was sworn in 1995. In 2000, she was elected as the town's mayor, where she served until 2010.

In 2002, Fennell ran for the Maryland House of Delegates in District 47. She came in fourth place in the primary election, receiving 13.1 percent of the vote.

In 2014, Fennell again ran for the Maryland House of Delegates, receiving the backing of state senator Victor R. Ramirez during the primary election. She won the Democratic primary alongside Jimmy Tarlau, receiving 23.7 percent of the vote and defeating incumbent state delegate Michael Summers. She received 52.1 percent of the vote in the general election.

== In the legislature ==
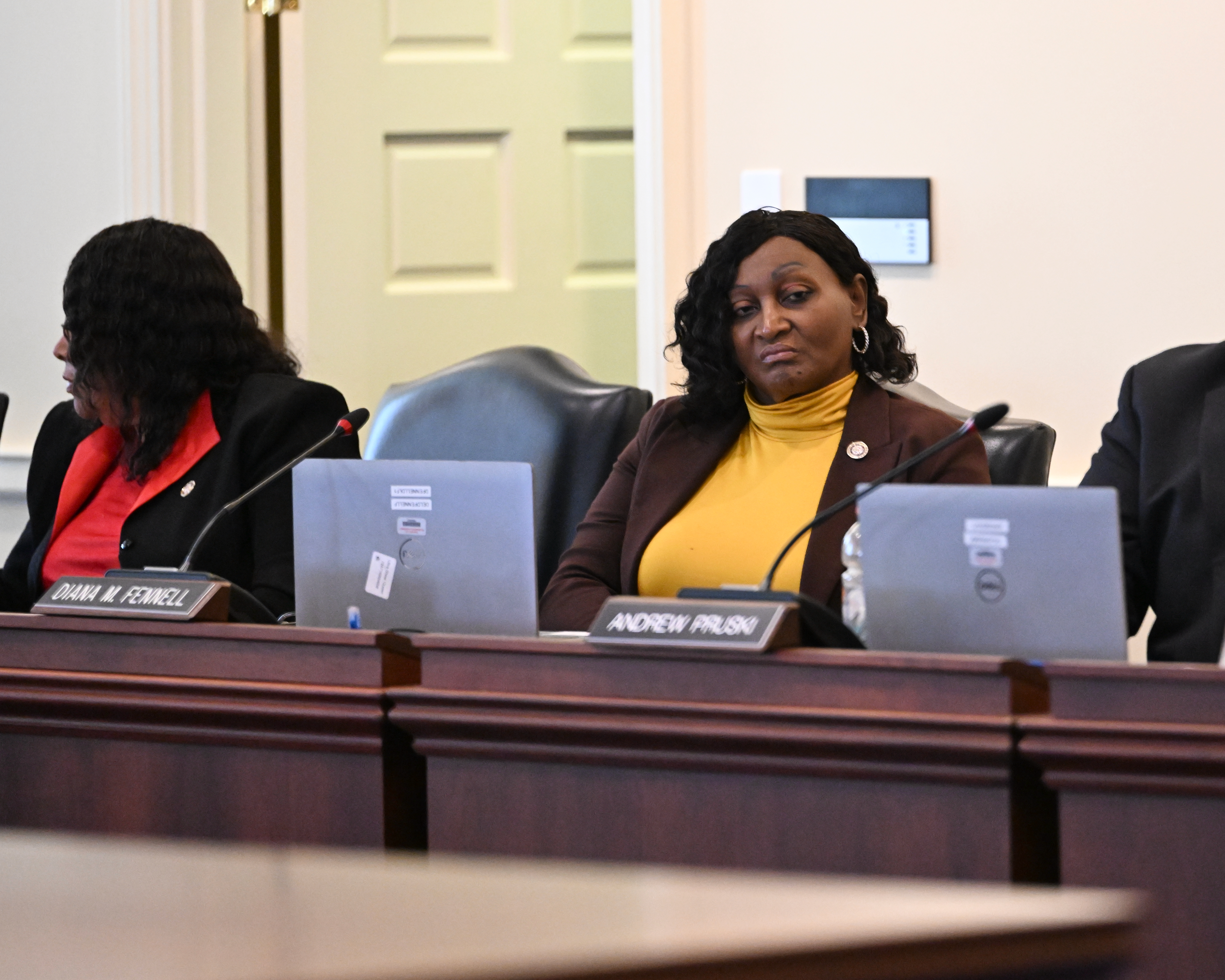
Fennell in the Economic Matters Committee, 2024

Fennell was sworn into the Maryland House of Delegates on January 14, 2015, and was assigned to the House Ways and Means Committee. In her committee, she serves on the election law subcommittee, the finance resources subcommittee, and the revenues subcommittee. She is also a member of the Prince George's County Delegation, Women Legislators of Maryland, and the Legislative Black Caucus of Maryland.

== Political positions ==
=== Elections ===
Fennell voted for legislation introduced in the 2019 legislative session that would lift a ban on developer contributions in county political races in Prince George's County, Maryland.

=== Marijuana ===
Fennell supported legislation introduced during the 2018 legislative session that would reform the state's Medical Cannabis Commission and ensure diversity for proprietors in the industry.

=== Minimum wage ===
Fennell introduced legislation during the 2019 legislative session that would raise the minimum wage to $15 an hour in 2023 and phase out the state's tipped wage by 2026. During committee hearings, the bill was amended to push back the full-on effective date to 2025 and to remove provisions to automatically increase the wage based on the national consumer price index. The bill passed as amended and received a gubernatorial veto override on March 28, 2019.

== Personal life ==
In February 2017, the Internal Revenue Service placed a $56,141 tax lien against Fennell's property, which she settled in April 2025.

== Electoral history ==
- 2002 Race for Maryland House of Delegates – 47th District (Democratic Primary)

Voters to choose three:

Name	Votes	Percent	Outcome
Rosetta C. Parker (Incumbent), Democratic	3,584	17.2%	Won
Doyle Niemann, Democratic	3,521	16.9%	Won
Victor R. Ramirez, Democratic	3,054	14.6%	Won
Diana M. Fennell, Democratic	2,724	13.1%	
Bob McGrory, Democratic	2,298	16.6%	
Lee P. Walker, Democratic	2,229	10.7%	
Lillian K. Beverly, Democratic	1,808	8.7%	
Fred Price Jr., Democratic	1,136	6.3%	
Theodore N. Pantazes, Democratic	323	1.5%	

- 2014 Race for Maryland House of Delegates – 47A District (Democratic Primary)

Voters to choose two:

Name	Votes	Percent	Outcome
Jimmy Tarlau, Democratic	2,728	26.7%	Won
Diana Fennell, Democratic	2,416	23.7%	Won
Michael Summers (Incumbent), Democratic	1,740	17.1%	
Malcolm Augustine, Democratic	1,688	16.6%	
Joseph Solomon, Democratic	1,627	16%	

- 2014 Race for Maryland House of Delegates – 47A District (General Election)

Voters to choose two:

Name	Votes	Percent	Outcome
Diana Fennell, Democratic	11,198	52.1%	Won
Jimmy Tarlau, Democratic	8,836	41.1%	Won
Fred Price Jr., Republican	1,424	6.6%	
Other Write-Ins	55	0.3%	

- 2018 Race for Maryland House of Delegates – 47A District (Democratic Primary)

Voters to choose two:

Name	Votes	Percent	Outcome
Diana Fennell (Incumbent), Democratic	5,239	37.8%	Won
Julian Ivey, Democratic	4,504	32.5%	Won
Jimmy Tarlau (Incumbent), Democratic	4,104	29.6%	

- 2018 Race for Maryland House of Delegates – 47A District (General Election)

Voters to choose two:

Name	Votes	Percent	Outcome
Julian Ivey, Democratic	15,981	52,2%	Won
Diana Fennell (Incumbent), Democratic	14,192	46.4%	Won
Other Write-Ins	429	1.4%	Won
