= Julian Ivey =

American politician (born 1995)

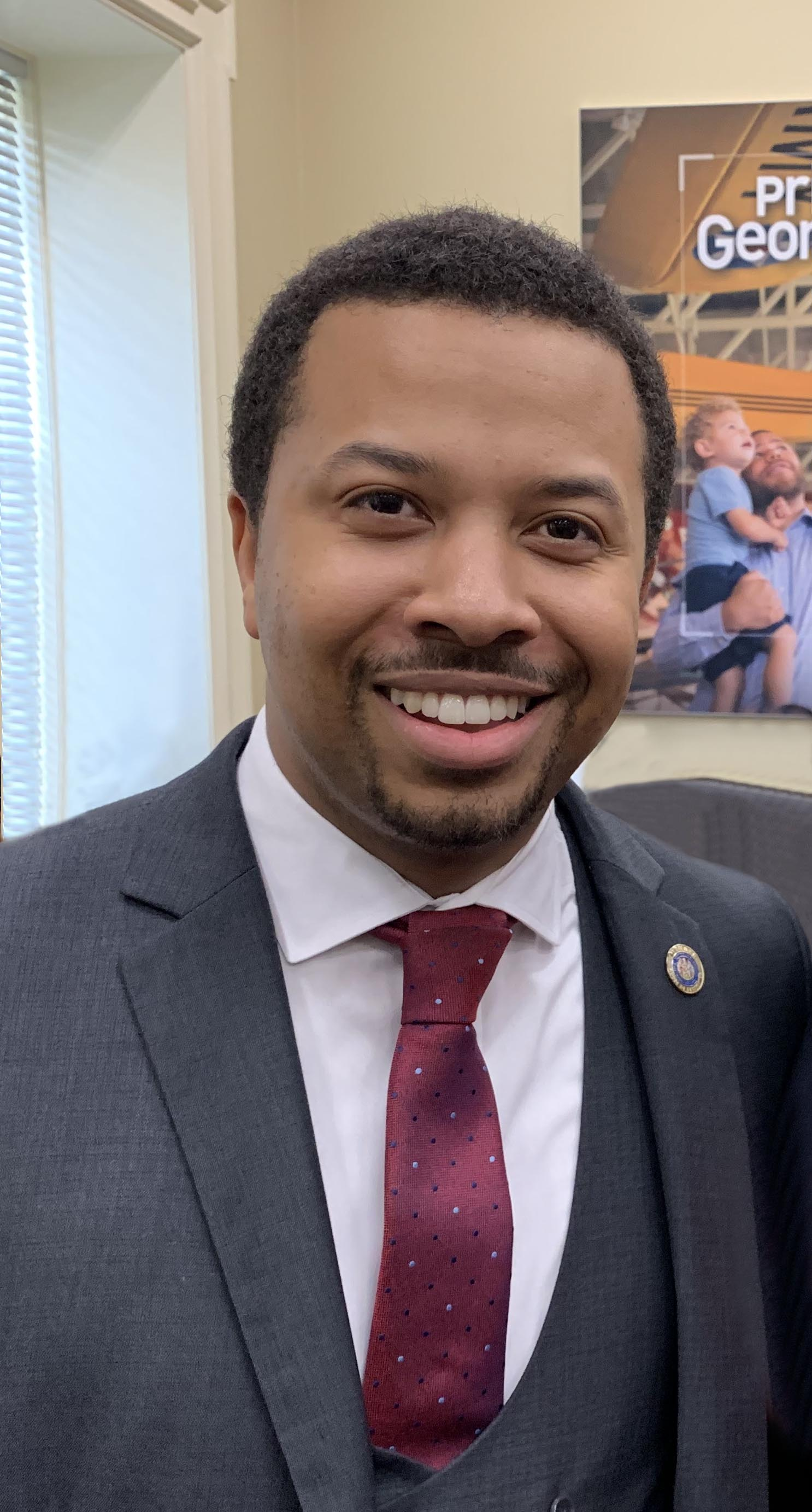

Member of the Maryland House of Delegates from the 47A district
- Incumbent
- Assumed office January 19, 2019 Serving with Diana M. Fennell
- Preceded by: Jimmy Tarlau

Personal details
- Born: Robert Julian Ivey; August 3, 1995 (age 31) Prince George's County, Maryland, U.S.
- Party: Democratic
- Spouse: Erin
- Children: 1
- Parents: Glenn Ivey (father); Jolene Ivey (mother)
- Education: University of Maryland, College Park (BA)
- Website: Official website

Robert Julian Ivey (born August 3, 1995) is an American politician serving as a member of the Maryland House of Delegates from District 47A in Prince George's County.

== Early life and education ==
Ivey was born in Prince George's County, Maryland, to Glenn and Jolene Ivey in 1995. His father is currently a member of Congress and his mother currently serves on the Prince George's County Council. As a sixth grader, Ivey starred in the Broadway production of The Lion King, singing and dancing in the role of young Simba. He graduated from Eleanor Roosevelt High School in 2013. In 2018, he received a Bachelor of Arts degree in political science from the University of Maryland, College Park, where he was a member of the campus' NAACP chapter and led protests over campus police tactics and campus racism.

== Career ==
During the 2016 presidential campaign, Ivey was elected to and attended the 2016 Democratic National Convention as a delegate for Bernie Sanders, and supported Hillary Clinton after she was nominated as candidate by the Democratic Party.

In May 2017, Ivey was elected to the Cheverly town council. During his first year on the town council, he introduced and passed legislation to designate the town a sanctuary city.

In 2018, Ivey ran for the Maryland House of Delegates in District 47A, challenging incumbent state delegate Jimmy Tarlau. During the primary, he received endorsements from state senator Victor R. Ramirez, the local Service Employees International Union, and state comptroller Peter Franchot.

During the 2018 gubernatorial primary, Ivey campaigned for former NAACP president Ben Jealous. In May 2018, Ivey accused Jealous of trying to keep him off the Democratic primary ballot to improve his own chances and those of Tarlau, who endorsed Jealous' gubernatorial campaign. Valerie Ervin, then-candidate for lieutenant governor, similarly claimed Jealous tried to keep her off that ticket by contacting her employer, the national Working Families Party. Jealous denied Ivey's claims, sharing text messages between him and Ivey where he told Ivey “hang in there. . . We are political family.”

Ivey defeated Tarlau in the Democratic primary in June, placing second behind incumbent state delegate Diana M. Fennell with 32.5 percent of the vote to Tarlau's 29.6 percent. He was unopposed in the general election.

In January 2020, Ivey was elected vice chair of the Prince George's County Delegation. In January 2023, Speaker of the Maryland House of Delegates Adrienne A. Jones appointed Ivey Deputy Majority Whip, as well as vice-chair of the Public Safety & Administration Subcommittee of the Appropriations Committee.

Ivey was campaign manager for his father Glenn Ivey's successful 2022 bid for the Democratic nomination to represent Maryland's 4th congressional district in the United States House of Representatives.

== In the legislature ==
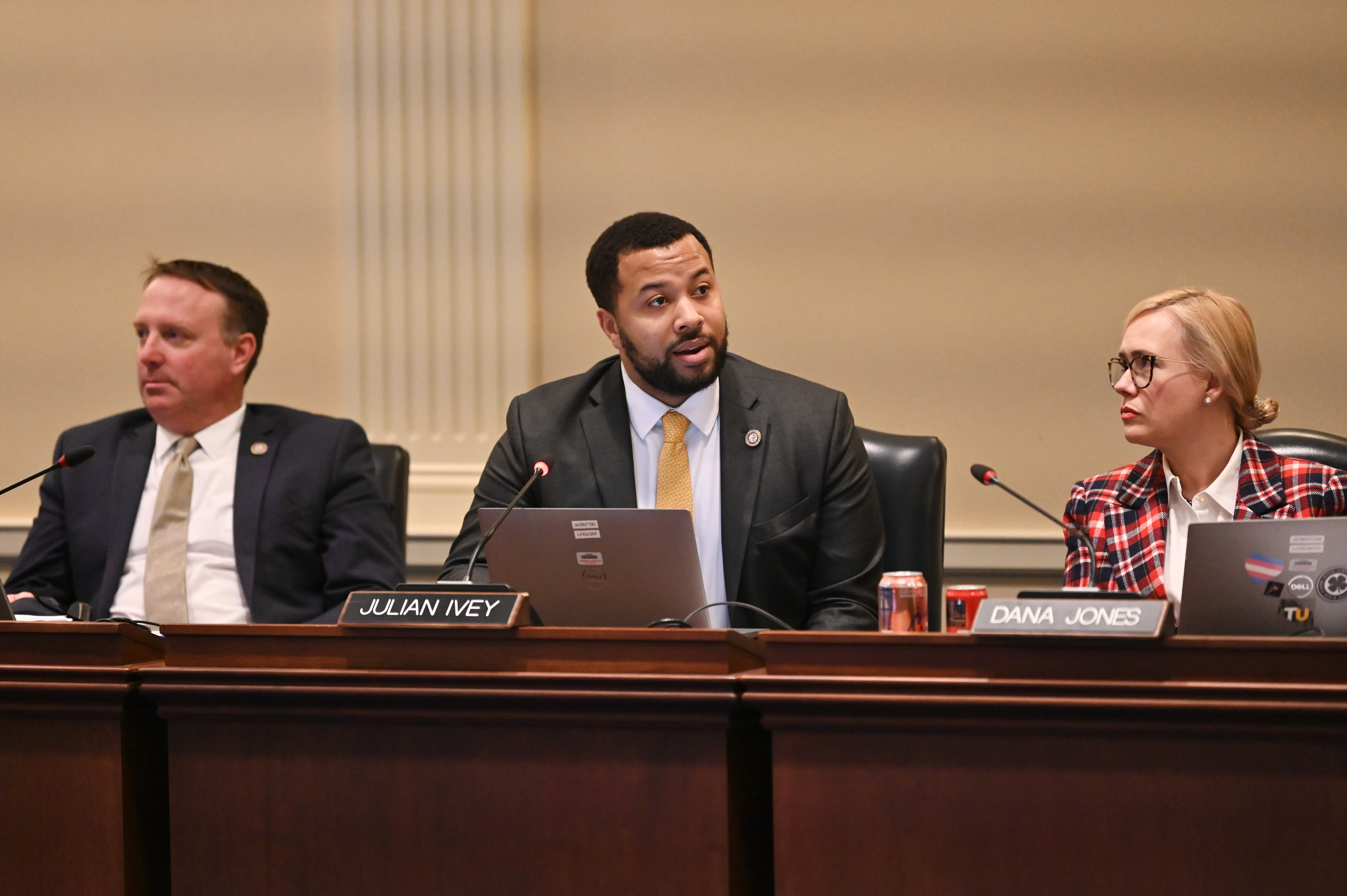
Ivey in the House Appropriations Committee, 2024

Ivey was sworn into the Maryland House of Delegates on January 9, 2019. He was assigned to the House Ways and Means Committee and serves on its Financial Resources and Local Revenues subcommittees. Ivey is a member of the Legislative Black Caucus of Maryland. Media outlets have described Ivey as a progressive.

== Political positions ==
=== Criminal justice ===
In June 2020, Ivey started a petition calling on leaders of the Maryland General Assembly and governor Larry Hogan to reconvene for a special legislative session on the COVID-19 pandemic, evictions, and police brutality. For each day following the petition, Ivey posted tweets highlighting victims of police brutality. The legislative leaders rejected calls to form a special session, but convened workgroups on creating legislation on issues including police reform. In September, Ivey wrote an op-ed for The Washington Post that again called for a special legislative session. House Majority Leader Eric Luedtke rebuked the op-ed in an internal memo, calling it "tremendously disrespectful to the Speaker of the House" to push for a special session in the press without first checking in with Jones and other colleagues.

Also in June 2020, Ivey co-signed a letter penned by Speaker Jones that called on Hogan to enact reforms surrounding police use of force policies in the state.

During the 2021 legislative session, Ivey introduced legislation that would require all Maryland law enforcement agencies to issue body-worn cameras to all on-duty officers by 2022.

=== Education ===
During the 2021 legislative session, Ivey introduced legislation to abolish the appointed members of the Prince George's County Board of Education. The bill died without a vote.

=== Elections ===
During the 2021 legislative session, Ivey introduced legislation that would automatically send out mail-in ballots to all registered voters. In December 2025, Ivey said he supported mid-decade redistricting in Maryland, saying that Maryland "has a responsibility to protect the voting power of every resident of this state" as national Republicans seek to diminish representation for voters of color.

=== Taxes ===
During the 2022 legislative session, Ivey introduced legislation that would exempt diabetic care products from the sales and use tax. The bill passed and became law on April 1, 2022.

== Personal life ==
Ivey is married to his wife Erin. They have a son.

== Electoral history ==
Male Delegates to the Democratic National Convention, District 4, 2016
Party	Candidate	Votes	%
Democratic	Erek Barron (Clinton)	67,011	14.6
Democratic	Anthony Christopher Woods (Clinton)	64,113	13.9
Democratic	Maurice Simpson, Jr. (Clinton)	63,216	13.7
Democratic	Charles W. Sims, Sr. (Clinton)	62,210	13.5
Democratic	Carlo Alberto Sanchez (Clinton)	62,160	13.5
Democratic	Julian Ivey (Sanders)	32,831	7.1
Democratic	Edward Terry (Sanders)	26,008	5.7
Democratic	Nathaniel L. Wallace (Sanders)	24,198	5.3
Democratic	Jimmy Tarlau (Sanders)	21,999	4.8
Democratic	Touko B. Leuga (Sanders)	21,046	4.6
Democratic	Brian L. Morris (Uncommitted)	7,733	1.7
Democratic	Ron Watson (Uncommitted)	7,579	1.6

Cheverly Town Council Election, 2017
Candidate	Votes	%
Julian Ivey	220	62.3
Nicholas D'Angelo	133	37.7

Maryland House of Delegates District 47A Democratic Primary Election, 2018
Party	Candidate	Votes	%
Democratic	Diana M. Fennell (incumbent)	5,239	37.8
Democratic	Julian Ivey	4,504	32.5
Democratic	Jimmy Tarlau (incumbent)	4,104	29.6

Maryland House of Delegates District 47A Election, 2018
Party	Candidate	Votes	%
Democratic	Julian Ivey	15,981	52.2
Democratic	Diana M. Fennell	14,192	46.4
Write-in		429	1.4

Maryland House of Delegates District 47A Democratic Primary Election, 2022
Party	Candidate	Votes	%
Democratic	Diana M. Fennell (incumbent)	6,201	50.1
Democratic	Julian Ivey	6,187	49.9

Maryland House of Delegates District 47A Election, 2022
Party	Candidate	Votes	%
Democratic	Julian Ivey	11,018	50.4
Democratic	Diana M. Fennell	10,621	48.6
Write-in		223	1.0
