= Carlo Sanchez =

American politician

Member of the Maryland House of Delegates from the 47B district
- In office October 30, 2015 – January 9, 2019
- Preceded by: Will Campos
- Succeeded by: Wanika B. Fisher

Personal details
- Born: April 1, 1982 (age 44) El Salvador
- Party: Democratic

Carlo Sanchez is an American politician who served as a Delegate to the Maryland General Assembly representing Maryland's 47th Legislative District in northwestern Prince George's County from 2015 to 2019.

== Personal life ==
Sanchez' parents moved to the United States from El Salvador, settling in Langley Park, Maryland, where Sanchez was born on April 1, 1982. He attended Takoma Academy, a Seventh-day Adventist school in Takoma Park, Maryland before earning an associate degree from Montgomery College and a bachelor's degree from the University of Maryland, College Park. He has worked as a public safety training officer for Montgomery College since 2000. He is an elder with the Washington Spanish Seventh-day Adventist Church, and his wife works as an operating room nurse.

== Political career ==
Sanchez began volunteering for future United States Senator Chris Van Hollen while still a student at Montgomery College during Van Hollen's 2002 campaign for Maryland's 8th Congressional District. After the conclusion of the campaign, Sanchez began to volunteer on other political campaigns. In 2010, he became involved in the Prince George's County Young Democrats, and by 2014 had been elected to the countywide Democratic Central Committee and as President of his neighborhood association. In 2015, following the resignation of Delegate Will Campos, Sanchez ran for the appointment to the open seat representing the heavily Hispanic District 47B. He was unopposed for the appointment and gained the support of District 47 Senator Victor R. Ramirez. He was sworn into the House of Delegates on October 30, 2015.

=== In the Legislature ===
Sanchez was appointed to serve as a member of the House Judiciary Committee, which oversees legislation affecting civil and criminal law, upon joining the House of Delegates. In 2017, he was elected Chair of the Maryland Legislative Latino Caucus.

Sanchez was defeated for election to his seat in the 2018 Democratic primary by Wanika B. Fisher, the eventual winner in the general election.

== Post-politics ==
In 2022, Sanchez was appointed to the Prince George's County Police Accountability Board.
