= Malcolm Augustine =

American politician (born 1969)

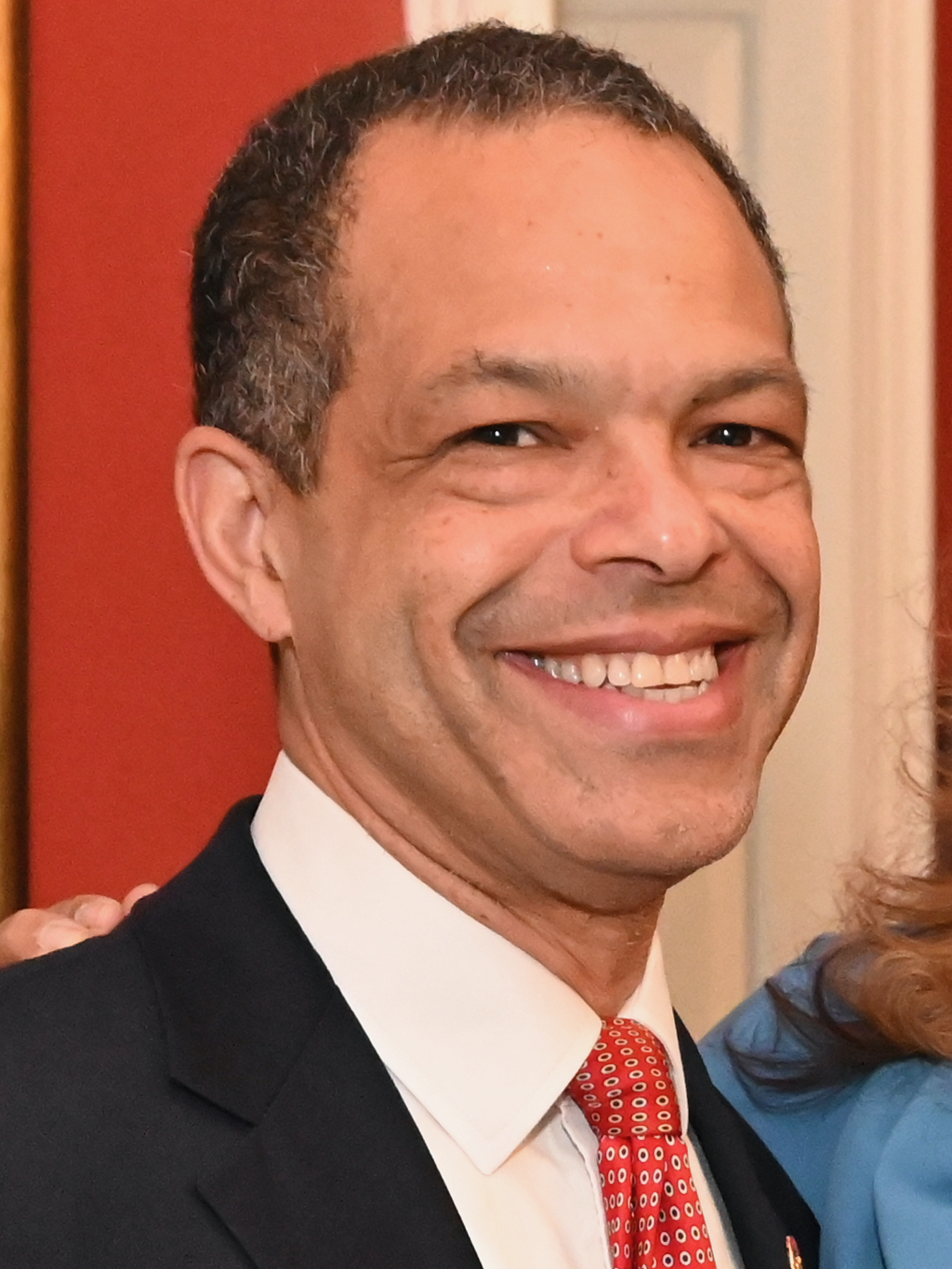

President pro tempore of the Maryland Senate
- Incumbent
- Assumed office January 11, 2023
- Preceded by: Melony G. Griffith

Member of the Maryland Senate from the 47th district
- Incumbent
- Assumed office January 9, 2019
- Preceded by: Victor R. Ramirez

Personal details
- Born: March 10, 1969 (age 57) Lafayette, Louisiana, U.S.
- Party: Democratic
- Children: 2
- Education: Harvard University (AB)

Malcolm L. Augustine (born March 10, 1969) is an American politician who has served as a member of the Maryland Senate from the 47th district since 2019. A member of the Democratic Party, Augustine has served as the president pro tempore of the Maryland Senate since 2023.

== Early life and career ==
Augustine was born in Lafayette, Louisiana on March 10, 1969. He graduated from Pittsford Mendon High School in Pittsford, New York and later attended Harvard University in Cambridge, Massachusetts, where he earned an A.B. degree in government in 1991. He is a member of the Kappa Alpha Psi fraternity.

Augustine entered politics in 2012 by becoming the co-chair of Progressive Cheverly. At the same time, he became the chair of the Cable Television Commission in Prince George's County, Maryland. In 2014, Augustine unsuccessfully ran for state delegate in District 47A, coming in fourth place and losing to Jimmy Tarlau and Diana Fennell.

In 2015, Prince George's County executive Rushern Baker appointed Augustine to represent Prince George's County on the Washington Metropolitan Area Transit Authority (WMATA) Board of Directors.

In August 2017, Augustine declared his candidacy for Maryland Senate, seeking to replace state senator Victor Ramirez, who sought to become the next Prince George's County State's Attorney. He won the Democratic primary with 84.1 percent of the vote and the general election with 93.0 percent of the vote.

== In the legislature ==
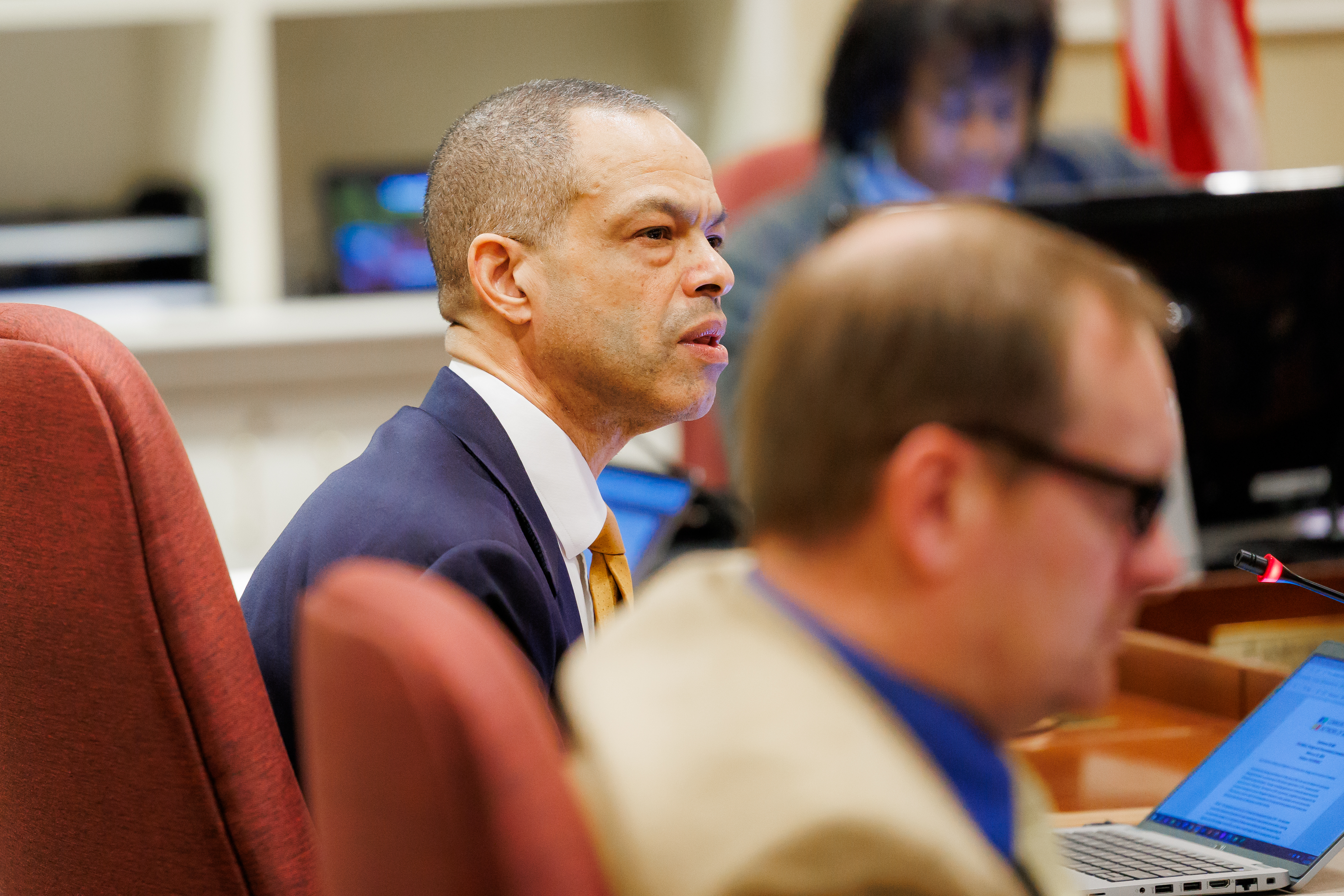
Augustine in the Education, Energy, and the Environment Committee, 2024

Augustine was sworn into the Maryland Senate on January 9, 2019. He served as a member of the Finance Committee during his first term, afterwards serving on the Education, Energy and the Environment Committee until 2025. Since 2025, Augustine served as a member of the Budget and Taxation Committee. In October 2026, Senate President Bill Ferguson named Augustine as the vice chair of the Senate Rules Committee.

Augustine also served as the president pro tempore of the Maryland Senate since 2023. He is also a member of the Legislative Black Caucus of Maryland, the Maryland Legislative Latino Caucus, and the Maryland Legislative Transit Caucus.

== Political positions ==
=== Environment ===
Augustine introduced legislation in the 2020 session that would ban plastic carryout bags from all stores and require stores to charge a minimum of 10 cents for paper bags. The bill's counterpart in the Maryland House of Delegates passed by a vote of 95-37 and received a favorable report from the Senate Finance Committee, but never received a vote in the Senate. The bill was reintroduced in the 2021 session and passed the House of Delegates by a vote of 97–37.

In 2021, the Maryland League of Conservation Voters gave Augustine a score of 89 percent in their annual environmental scorecard.

=== Healthcare ===
Augustine introduced legislation in the 2020 session that would allow minors over 12 years of age to seek mental health treatment without their parent's consent. The bill passed the State Senate by a vote of 30–15. The bill was reintroduced in the 2021 session and passed and became law without the governor's signature.

Augustine introduced legislation in the 2021 session would require employers to provide workers with safe and hygienic workspaces, personal protective equipment, emergency pandemic action plans that include sanitation protocol and changes in shift hours, paid health and bereavement leave, free COVID-19 testing, an additional $3 an hour in hazard pay and the ability to refuse dangerous work without fear of retaliation. A narrowed version, which removed the initial $3 an hour in hazard pay and made paid sick leave contingent upon funding from the state or federal government, passed the House of Delegates by a vote of 93–39.

In the 2022 session, Augustine introduced legislation that would include dental care in patients' Medicaid coverage.

=== Housing ===
During the 2026 legislative session, Augustine introduced a bill that would grant developers vested rights on zoning and defer development and impact fees for developers until after construction is completed.

=== Immigration ===
During the 2026 legislative session, Augustine supported a bill that would prohibit counties from entering into 287(g) program agreements with U.S. Immigration and Customs Enforcement, saying that ICE was acting in a "lawless manner" that the state should not be contributing to.

=== Policing ===
During the 2026 legislative session, Augustine supported a bill to prohibit law enforcement officers from wearing face coverings, saying that the practice was "familiar in oppressive, totalitarian countries" with the purpose of intimidating and terrorizing individuals.

=== Redistricting ===
In February 2026, Augustine declined to say whether he supported or opposed pursuing mid-decade redistricting in Maryland, saying that he "has not heard from one constituent pushing him to redistrict".

=== Transportation ===
While on the WMATA Board of Directors, Augustine argued against fare hikes and service cuts, expressing worry that they would hasten ridership decline. He was the only board member to vote against a 2017 fare hike that increased the price by 10 cents for rush hour and 25 cents for off-peak travel times.

In the Senate, Augustine expressed major concerns against a proposal to build a Superconducting Maglev (SCMAGLEV) train that would connect Washington, D.C. to Baltimore, instead calling on the legislature to invest in the Red Line project cancelled by Governor Larry Hogan.

== Personal life ==
Augustine attends religious services at the St. Ambrose Catholic Church in Cheverly, Maryland.

== Electoral history ==
- 2014 Race for Maryland House of Delegates – 47A District (Democratic Primary)

Voters to choose two:

| Name | Votes | Percent | Outcome |
|---|---|---|---|
| Jimmy Tarlau, Democratic | 2,728 | 26.7% | Won |
| Diana Fennell, Democratic | 2,416 | 23.7% | Won |
| Michael Summers (Incumbent), Democratic | 1,740 | 17.1% | |
| Malcolm Augustine, Democratic | 1,688 | 16.6% | |
| Joseph Solomon, Democratic | 1,627 | 16% | |

- 2018 Race for Maryland Senate – 47th District (Democratic Primary)

| Name | Votes | Percent | Outcome |
|---|---|---|---|
| Malcolm Augustine, Democratic | 7,841 | 84.1% | Won |
| Adrian Petrus, Democratic | 1,478 | 15.9% | |

- 2018 Race for Maryland Senate – 47th District (General Election)

| Name | Votes | Percent | Outcome |
|---|---|---|---|
| Malcolm Augustine, Democratic | 23,983 | 93.0% | Won |
| Fred Price, Jr., Republican | 1,777 | 6.9% | |
| Other write-ins | 33 | 0.1% | |

Maryland Senate
| Preceded by Melony G. Griffith | President pro tempore of the Maryland Senate; 2023–present | Incumbent |
