= David C. Harrington =

American politician (1954–2022)

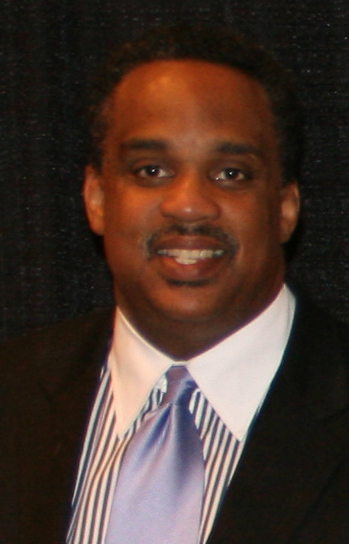

Member of the Maryland Senate from the 47th district
- In office 2008–2011
- Preceded by: Gwendolyn T. Britt
- Succeeded by: Victor R. Ramirez

Prince George's County Council 5th District
- In office 2002–2008
- Succeeded by: Andrea Harrison

Mayor, Bladensburg, Maryland
- In office 1995–2002

Personal details
- Born: July 31, 1954 New York City, U.S.
- Died: September 20, 2022 (aged 68) Cheverly, Maryland, U.S.
- Party: Democratic
- Spouse: Cheryl Harrington
- Children: 2
- Education: Howard University (BA); Miami University (MA)

David C. Harrington (July 31, 1954 – September 20, 2022) was an American politician from Maryland, a member of the Democratic Party and a former member of the Maryland State Senate. From 2008 to 2022, he served as president and CEO of the Prince George's Chamber of Commerce in addition to serving as a Senior Policy Advisor for Common Health Action. Harrington was a board member of the Eugene and Agnes E. Meyer Foundation, Consumer Health Foundation, Bowie State Board of Visitors and co-lead of the Robert Wood Johnson Place Matters special committee.

== Early life ==
Harrington was born on July 31, 1954, in New York City, New York. He has a B.A. in political science from Howard University. He also received a M.A. from the Miami University in Oxford, Ohio. From 1995 to 2002, Harrington was the Mayor of Bladensburg, Maryland. From 2001 to 2002, he served as president of the Maryland Municipal League. In 2002, he was elected to represent District 5 on Prince George's County Council.

He worked as a senior fellow and faculty member at the James MacGregor Burns Academy of Leadership at the University of Maryland.

In 2006, Harrington ran for reelection to Prince George's County Council. In December 2007, Harrington was elected Council Chair.

== In the legislature ==
Harrington was appointed to the State Senate in 2008 to fill the vacancy created by the death of Gwendolyn T. Britt. While serving in the senate, Harrington was a member of the Education, Health and Environmental Affairs Committee and a member of the Legislative Black Caucus of Maryland.

Harrington ran for reelection to the state senate in 2010 but was defeated.

== Family ==
Harrington's wife Cheryl is the owner of Shortcake Bakery. His oldest son, Stephen, is an alumnus of Morehouse College and the Brown University Graduate School. David's younger son Christopher is an alumnus of Dickinson College and has an MBA from the Smith School at the University of Maryland.

Harrington died September 20, 2022.
