= Wanika B. Fisher =

American politician (born 1988)

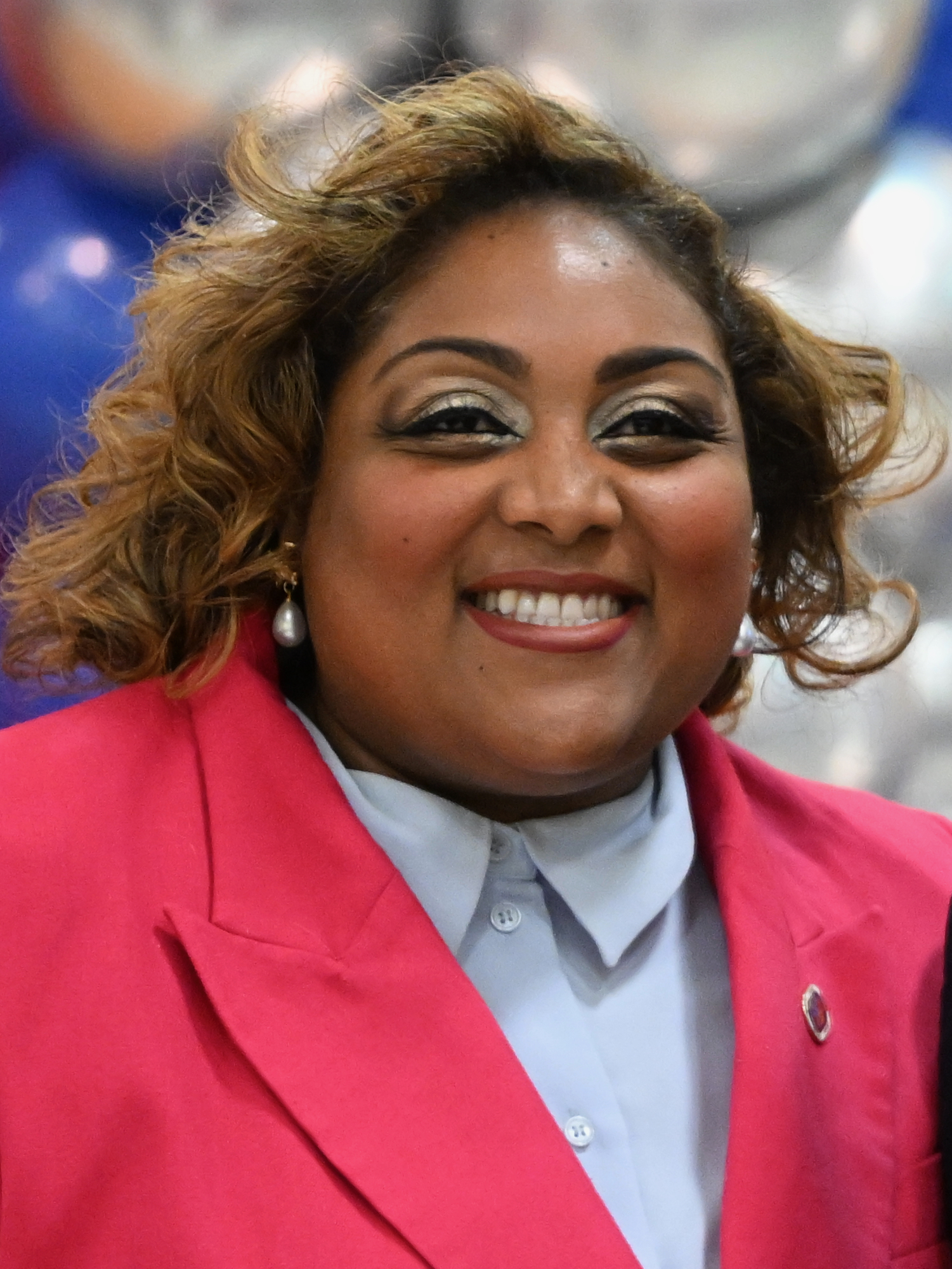
- Fisher in 2025

Member of the Prince George's County Council, District 2
- Incumbent
- Assumed office December 5, 2022
- Preceded by: Deni Taveras

Member of the Maryland House of Delegates from the 47B district
- In office January 9, 2019 – December 5, 2022
- Preceded by: Carlo Sanchez
- Succeeded by: Deni Taveras

Personal details
- Born: June 16, 1988 (age 38) New York City, U.S.
- Party: Democratic
- Education: University of Maryland (BA); Penn State Dickinson Law (JD)
- Profession: Attorney

Wanika B. Fisher (born June 16, 1988) is an American politician and lawyer. She is a member of the Prince George's County Council representing district 2. She was first elected to the council in 2022 as a Democrat. Previously, she served as a member of the Maryland House of Delegates representing district 47B from 2019 to 2022.

== Early life ==
Fisher was born in New York, New York. Her father is a Yoruba Nigerian and her mother is an Indian South African who moved to the United Kingdom as a teenager to escape apartheid. Her parents were small-business owners in Westchester County, New York. She graduated from the University of Maryland, College Park with a B.A. in government and politics in 2010. While attending the university, she became a member of the sorority Alpha Kappa Alpha. Fisher earned a Juris Doctor at the Dickinson School of Law, Pennsylvania State University in 2013 and was admitted to Maryland Bar. She then worked as an assistant State's Attorney in Prince George's and is now in private practice.

== Political career ==
=== Maryland House of Delegates ===
Fisher was sworn into the Maryland House of Delegates on January 9, 2019, and assigned to the House Judiciary committee. She served as the Assistant Majority Leader from 2020 to 2022.

=== Prince George's County Council ===
In June 2021, Fisher announced that she would not seek re-election to the House of Delegates, instead opting to run for Prince George's County Council. Fisher won the Democratic primary election on July 19, 2022, defeating former state senator Victor R. Ramirez and activist Raymond Nevo, and later won general election on November 8, 2022.

During her tenure, Fisher served as the chair of the Public Safety, Health and Human Services Committee on the Prince George's County Council. In 2026, Fisher introduced legislation to criminalize attendance at street car rallies. Following the death of DaCara Thompson, she introduced DaCara's Law, which informs residents that there is no wait time to file a missing persons report and creates an awareness campaign on missing women and girls in Prince George's County.
