= Jolene Ivey =

American politician (born 1961)

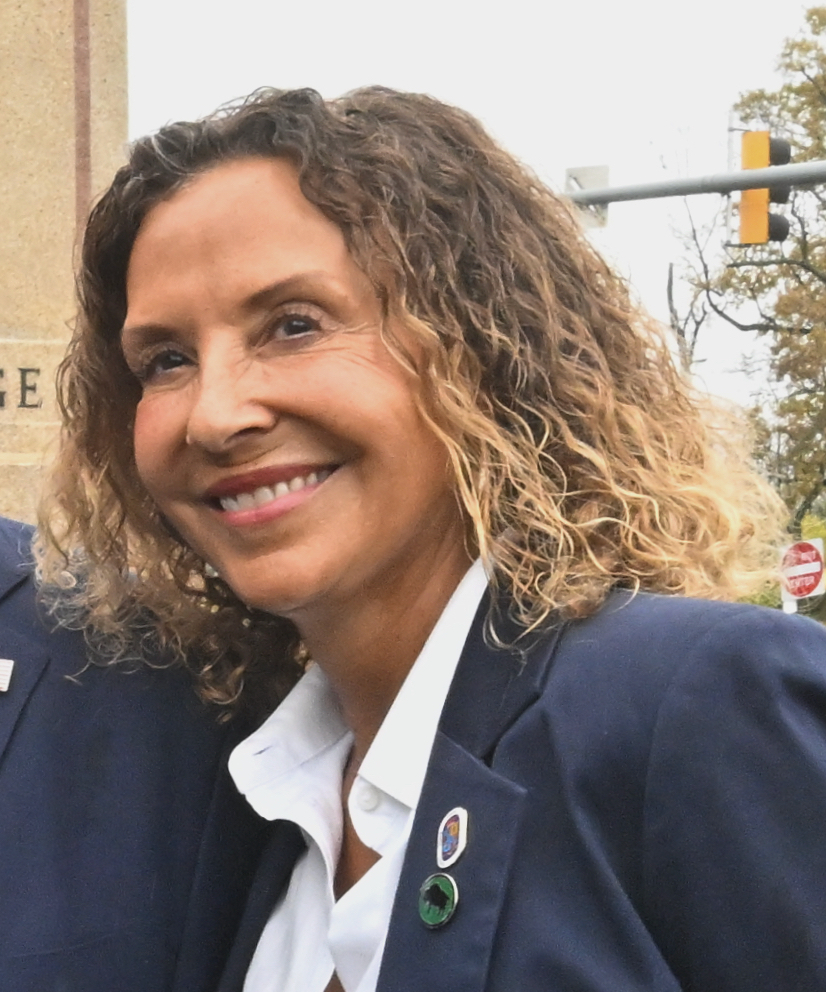

Member of the Prince George's County Council
- Incumbent
- Assumed office December 3, 2018
- Preceded by: Andrea Harrison (5th); Mel Franklin (at-large)
- Succeeded by: Shayla Adams-Stafford (5th)
- Constituency: 5th district (2018–2024); At-large district (2024–present)

Member of the Maryland House of Delegates from the 47th district
- In office January 10, 2007 – January 14, 2015
- Preceded by: Rosetta C. Parker
- Succeeded by: Jimmy Tarlau

Personal details
- Born: Jolene Stephenson; July 30, 1961 (age 65) Washington, D.C., U.S.
- Party: Democratic
- Spouse: Glenn Ivey (m. 1988)
- Children: 5, including Julian
- Education: Towson University (BA); University of Maryland, College Park (MA)

Jolene Ivey (née Stephenson; born July 30, 1961) is an American politician who has served as a member of the Prince George's County Council since 2018, first representing the 5th district from 2018 to 2024 and then the county's at-large district since 2024. She has also served as the council's president from 2023 to 2025. A member of the Democratic Party, Ivey was a member of the Maryland House of Delegates from the 47th district from 2007 to 2015.

Ivey ran for lieutenant governor of Maryland on the ticket of Maryland Attorney General Doug Gansler in 2014. The ticket finished second in the Democratic Primary behind Lieutenant Governor Anthony Brown and his running mate Kenneth Ulman who went on to be defeated by Republican businessman Larry Hogan and Boyd Rutherford in the general.

== Early life and education ==
Ivey was born in Washington, D.C. on July 30, 1961, to father Joseph L. Stephenson, an African-American U.S. Army captain during World War II, and mother Shirlita Hutchins, a white woman. Her parents divorced when she was three years old, and her father remarried to Genevieve Abel Stephenson, an African-American woman, in 1968, when Jolene was seven. Ivey graduated from High Point High School and later attended Towson University, where she earned a Bachelor of Arts degree in mass communication in 1982, and the University of Maryland, College Park, earning a Master of Arts degree in journalism in 1992.

== Career ==
After graduating from Towson, Ivey worked as a co-host of Say Baltimore on WMAR-TV and WNUV from 1983 to 1984, afterwards working as a writer and producer for WMAR-TV until 1988. She has worked as a freelance writer since 1989, and as the director of media relations for the Community Teachers Institute since 2004.

Ivey first got involved in politics after being elected class representative as a senior at High Point High School in 1978. She later volunteered for Jesse Jackson's 1984 presidential campaign. From 1988 to 1989, Ivey worked as the press secretary for U.S. Representative Ben Cardin. In 1997, she started Mocha Moms, a support group for at-home mothers of color that also pushed for policy changes to support breastfeeding mothers.

=== Maryland House of Delegates ===
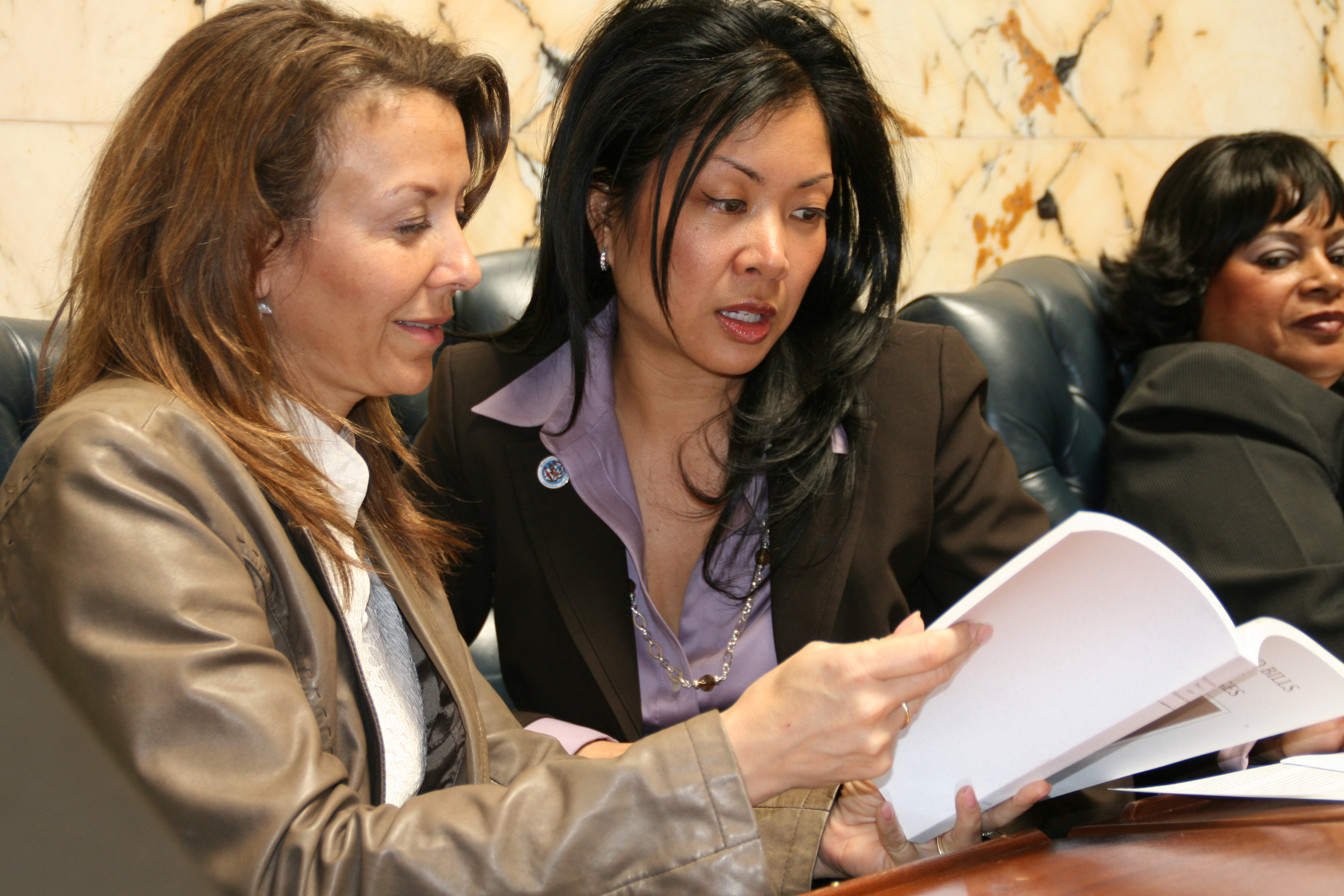
Ivey and Kris Valderrama share info on House floor

Ivey ran for the Maryland House of Delegates in 2006, challenging the district's three incumbents. She defeated delegate Rosetta Parker in the September 2006 Democratic primary and ran unopposed alongside delegates Doyle Niemann and Victor R. Ramirez in the general election. Ivey was sworn into the Maryland House of Delegates on January 10, 2007. She was a member of the Ways and Means Committee during her entire tenure and served as the chair of the Prince George's County Delegation from 2012 to 2014. She also focused on issues related to children and families, and was supportive of same-sex marriage in Maryland and efforts to authorize a casino in Prince George's County.

Ivey was a delegate to the 2008 Democratic National Convention, pledged to U.S. Senator Barack Obama.

In December 2012, Ivey defended former state delegate Tiffany Alston following her suspension from office after being found guilty of stealing state funds to pay an employee at her law firm, saying that Alston should still have her seat "if the truth is that she made a sloppy bookkeeping mistake".

=== 2014 Maryland lieutenant gubernatorial campaign ===
In September 2013, The Washington Post reported that Maryland Attorney General Doug Gansler had narrowed his running mate choices to a handful of politicians from Prince George's County and Baltimore, including Ivey. Gansler announced Ivey as his running mate on October 14, 2013. On the campaign trail, Ivey criticized Lieutenant Governor Anthony Brown as a "failed leader" and focused her attacks on his voting record, mismanagement of the state's health insurance marketplace, and his decision to send his children to a private school. She also defended Gansler after the National Journal published a photo showing him at a house party attended by his son where underage drinking was taking place.

Gansler and Ivey were defeated in the Democratic primary election by Brown on June 24, 2014, placing second with 24.2 percent of the vote. Had the Gansler-Ivey ticket won the Democratic primary and defeated Larry Hogan in the general election, Ivey would have been the first Democratic African American woman to serve as lieutenant governor in the United States and the second nationwide, behind only Florida Lieutenant Governor Jennifer Carroll. Following her defeat, Ivey worked as a community relations representative for Lerner Enterprises in its bid to bring the Federal Bureau of Investigation's new headquarters to Prince George's County.

=== Prince George's County Council ===
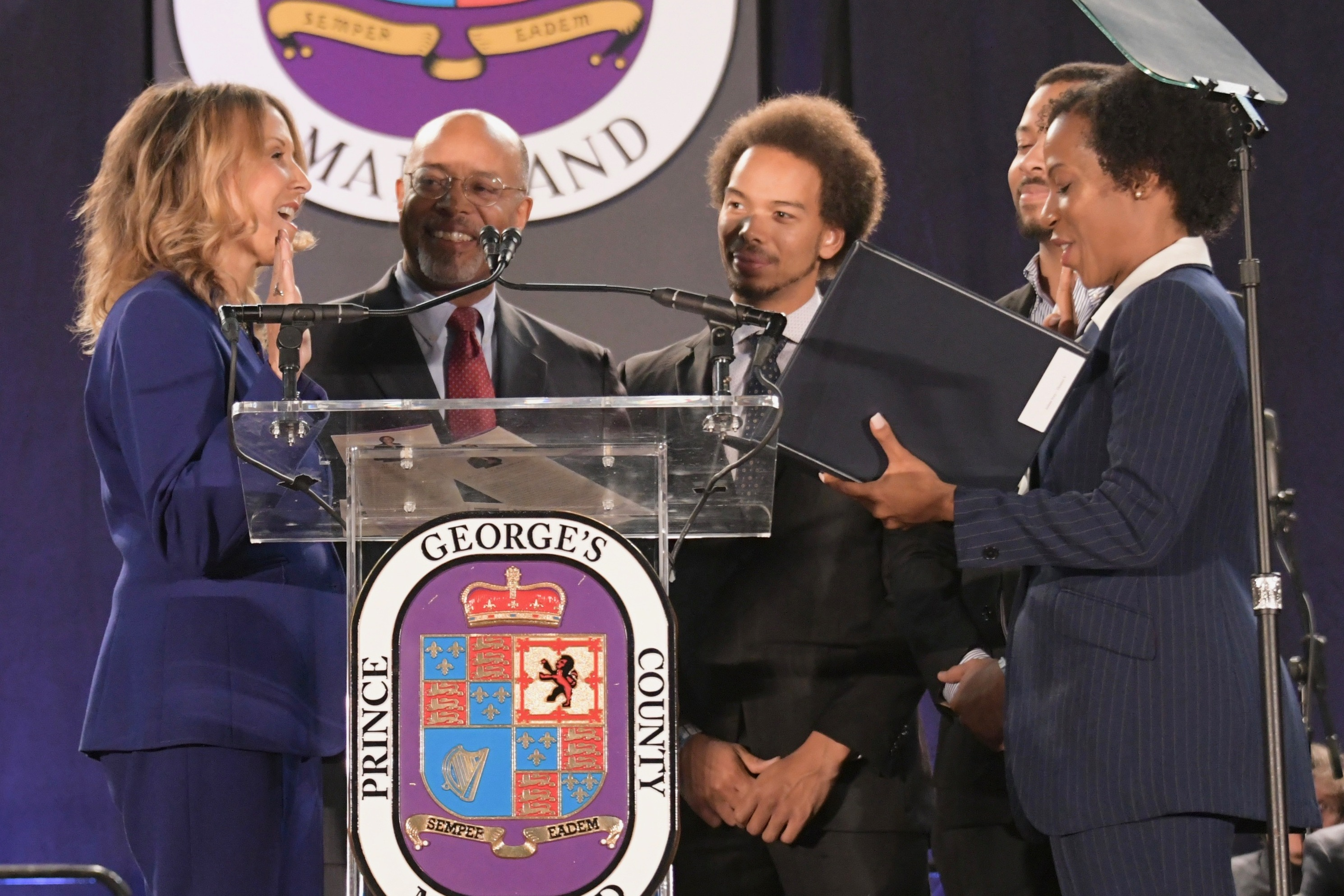
Ivey being sworn in as county councilmember in December 2018

In October 2015, Ivey said that she was planning to run for Prince George's County Executive in 2018, seeking to succeed term-limited county executive Rushern Baker; she instead filed to run for the Prince George's County Council in District 5 in May 2017, seeking to succeed term-limited councilmember Andrea Harrison. Her campaign focused on improving constituent services in the county. Ivey defeated former Bladensburg mayor Walter James Jr. in the Democratic primary on June 26, 2018, and ran unopposed in the general election.

Ivey was sworn in to the Prince George's County Council on December 3, 2018. The Washington Post has described Ivey as a member of the county council's liberal bloc. She ran unopposed for a second term in 2022. In December 2022, outgoing county council chair Calvin Hawkins nominated Ivey to succeed him as council chair. However, she declined the nomination, instead nominating Tom Dernoga, who was unanimously elected to serve as chair. In December 2023, the Prince George's County Council unanimously voted to elect Ivey as its chair. She served in this position until March 2025, when the county council elected Ed Burroughs as its new chair in a surprise vote.

In June 2024, after county councilmember Mel Franklin resigned from his at-large seat on the county council, Ivey told WUSA-TV that she would run in the special election to succeed Franklin. She won the Democratic primary on August 6, 2024, and defeated Republican nominee Michael Riker in the general election on November 5, 2024.

In October 2024, Ivey said that she would run for Prince George's County Executive if Angela Alsobrooks defeats Larry Hogan in the 2024 United States Senate election in Maryland. After Alsobrooks resigned on December 2, 2024, Ivey formally announced her campaign in the 2025 Prince George's County executive special election. She withdrew from the race, but remained on the Democratic primary ballot, on February 12, 2025. In March 2025, Ivey revealed in an email to her constituents that she had withdrawn from the county executive election because she had multiple ongoing health concerns involving her lungs, stomach, and colon.

== Political positions ==
=== Education ===
During the 2013 legislative session, Ivey supported Prince George's County Executive Rushern Baker's plan to take control of the Prince George's County school system, calling it the "final and most important piece in our county's renaissance." In 2014, she criticized a proposal by Governor Martin O'Malley to provide $4 million to expand access to pre-kindergarten classes, saying that it was too little of an amount to do much to support kids who needed it.

In October 2020, Ivey voted against a plan to build six schools in Prince George's County using a public-private partnership, expressing concerns with the partnership's lack of transparency and questioning its timing amid the COVID-19 pandemic.

=== Ethics reforms ===
During the 2012 legislative session and after Prince George's County councilmember Leslie Johnson plead guilty to federal corruption charges, Ivey introduced a bill to amend the Constitution of Maryland to add an amendment requiring officeholders who plead guilty or are convicted of a felony to immediately resign from office.

=== Environment ===
In February 2012, Ivey voted for a bill to impose a five-cent tax on plastic bags in Prince George's County.

=== Housing and development ===
Ivey supports relocating the Federal Bureau of Investigation's headquarters to Prince George's County.

In October 2013, Ivey said that she opposed plans to redevelop part of the University of Maryland Golf Course into an academic village of housing, office, and retail development.

During the 2014 legislative session, Ivey introduced legislation to ban cell towers from being built on Prince George's County Public Schools properties.

In 2019, Ivey introduced a bill to eliminate and cut the county's food truck application fees, which were among the most expensive in the Washington metropolitan area. The bill passed and became law.

During the 2022 legislative session, Ivey testified for legislation that would allow local governments to pass just cause eviction laws.

In April 2024, Ivey expressed concerns with a proposal to cap rent increases in Prince George's County at three percent per year, saying that it was "not a permanent solution" and would scare away landlords in a county where nearly four in every ten residents is a renter.

=== Marijuana ===
During her 2014 lieutenant gubernatorial campaign, Ivey said she supported decriminalizing marijuana use, pointing to the penalties' disproportionate impact on African Americans and Latinos. She declined to back legalization, worrying that it would make Maryland a magnet for people in surrounding states where it remained illegal.

=== Paid sick leave ===
In October 2015, Ivey supported a bill that required Prince George's County businesses to provide employees up to seven days of paid sick leave annually.

=== Redistricting ===
In October 2021, Ivey voted against the county council redistricting plan proposed by councilmember Derrick Leon Davis and criticized the county council for voting to approve it over the map that was being drawn by the county's redistricting commission. Davis' redistricting plan was overturned and replaced by the commission-drawn map by the Maryland Court of Appeals in March 2022.

=== Social issues ===
During her tenure in the House of Delegates, Ivey advocated for the removal of the Roger B. Taney Monument at the Maryland State House. She attended the memorial's removal in August 2017. Ivey also supported repealing "Maryland, My Maryland" as the official state song. In 2013, she introduced legislation to designate November 1, the day on which Maryland abolished slavery in 1864, as "Maryland Emancipation Day".

Ivey supported the death penalty amidst efforts to repeal it in 2013, but eventually voted for a bill to repeal it after her husband Glenn testified for it.

During the 2011 legislative session, Ivey supported the Civil Marriage Protection Act, which legalized same-sex marriage in Maryland. In October 2012, she appeared in an ad to support Question 6.

In June 2021, Ivey expressed frustration with the county's spending of at least $17.6 million toward defending the county in police discrimination lawsuits, saying that the county should do more to stand up for African-Americans as a majority-Black county.

In October 2022, Ivey voted against the appointment of outgoing councilmember Todd Turner as the chair of the county ethics office, expressing concerns with his integrity in the office.

=== Taxes ===
During her tenure in the House of Delegates, Ivey voted for increases to the state's corporate income tax, sales tax, sin tax, and gas tax. She opposed a proposal to raise property taxes in Prince George's County amidst the COVID-19 pandemic in Maryland.

=== Transportation ===
Ivey opposed proposals by Governor Larry Hogan to expand the Capital Beltway. She also opposed proposals to build a Maglev train connecting Washington, D.C. and Baltimore, saying that it would "disproportionately benefit the wealthy" and hurt the county by peeling customers away from Amtrak.

== Personal life ==
Ivey met her future husband, Glenn Ivey, through a mutual friend who attended Jolene's high school and Glenn's law school. They have been married since 1988, have five children—including Maryland delegate Julian Ivey—and live in Cheverly, Maryland. Three were home births. Ivey is a member of the Cheverly United Methodist Church.

== Electoral history ==
Maryland House of Delegates District 47 Democratic primary election, 2006
Party	Candidate	Votes	%
Democratic	Victor R. Ramirez (incumbent)	5,797	31.3
Democratic	Jolene Ivey	5,653	30.5
Democratic	Doyle Niemann (incumbent)	3,881	20.9
Democratic	Rosetta C. Parker (incumbent)	3,209	17.3

Maryland House of Delegates District 47 election, 2006
Party	Candidate	Votes	%
Democratic	Jolene Ivey	12,860	35.3
Democratic	Victor R. Ramirez (incumbent)	12,231	33.6
Democratic	Doyle Niemann (incumbent)	11,229	30.8
Write-in		120	0.3

Maryland House of Delegates District 47 election, 2010
Party	Candidate	Votes	%
Democratic	Jolene Ivey (incumbent)	14,404	35.4
Democratic	Michael G. Summers	12,337	30.3
Democratic	Doyle Niemann (incumbent)	11,925	29.3
Republican	Rachel Audi	1,853	4.6
Write-in		150	0.4

Maryland gubernatorial Democratic primary election, 2014
Party	Candidate	Votes	%
Democratic	Anthony Brown; Kenneth Ulman	249,398	51.4
Democratic	Doug Gansler; Jolene Ivey	117,383	24.2
Democratic	Heather Mizeur; Delman Coates	104,721	21.6
Democratic	Cindy Walsh; Mary Elizabeth Wingate-Pennacchia	6,863	1.4
Democratic	Charles Smith; Clarence Tucker	3,507	0.7
Democratic	Ralph Jaffe; Freda Jaffe	3,221	0.7

Prince George's County Council District 5 Democratic primary election, 2018
Party	Candidate	Votes	%
Democratic	Jolene Ivey	9,648	72.9
Democratic	Walter Lee James, Jr.	1,449	11.0
Democratic	Patricia M. Waiters	1,139	8.6
Democratic	Rochelle Mincey-Thompson	691	5.2
Democratic	Albert Slocum	302	2.3

Prince George's County Council District 5 election, 2018
Party	Candidate	Votes	%
Democratic	Jolene Ivey	29,839	99.3
Write-in		206	0.7

Prince George's County Council District 5 election, 2022
Party	Candidate	Votes	%
Democratic	Jolene Ivey (incumbent)	21,023	99.1
Write-in		201	0.9

Prince George's County Council At-Large Democratic special primary election, 2024
Party	Candidate	Votes	%
Democratic	Jolene Ivey	29,698	47.54
Democratic	Tim Adams	19,061	30.51
Democratic	Tamara Davis Brown	5,723	9.16
Democratic	Angela Angel	3,371	5.40
Democratic	Marvin E. Holmes Jr.	1,473	2.36
Democratic	Gabriel Njinimbot	1,176	1.88
Democratic	Kiesha D. Lewis (withdrawn)	859	1.38
Democratic	Judy Mickens-Murray	688	1.10
Democratic	Leo Bachi Eyomobo	416	0.67
