= Will Campos =

American politician (born 1974)

William A. Campos
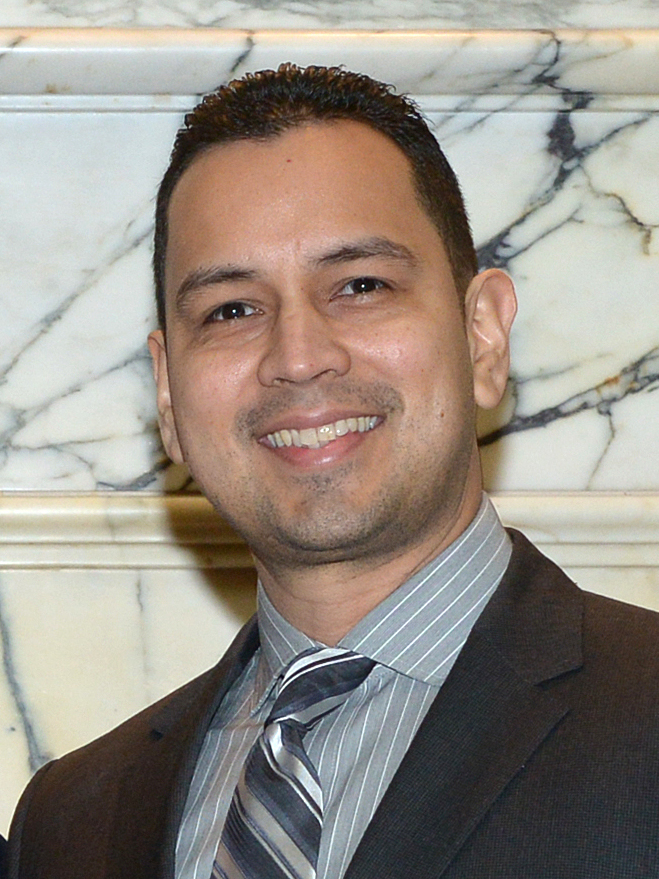
- Campos in 2015

Member of the Maryland House of Delegates from the 47B district
- In office January 14, 2015 – September 10, 2015
- Preceded by: Doyle L. Niemann as District 47
- Succeeded by: Carlo Sanchez

Member of the Prince George's County Council from District 2
- In office November 2004 – December 1, 2014
- Preceded by: Peter A. Shapiro
- Succeeded by: Deni Taveras

Personal details
- Born: William A. Campos; October 7, 1974 (age 51) El Salvador
- Party: Democratic
- Spouse: Married

William A. Campos (born October 7, 1974) is an American politician from Prince George's County, Maryland convicted for corruption in 2018. He served in the Maryland House of Delegates and on the Prince George's County Council.

== Early life ==
Campos was born in El Salvador on October 7, 1974. He attended Eleanor Roosevelt High School in Greenbelt, Maryland; the University of Maryland, College Park, receiving a B.A. in ancient art history & archaeology; and the University of Maryland, University College, receiving a B.S. in computer studies & information systems.

== Political career ==
Prior to holding office, Campos in 2002 was an aide to then-Delegate Victor R. Ramirez, District 47, Prince George's County.

Campos represented District 2 on the Prince George's County Council for ten years, winning a special election in 2004 when his predecessor resigned, and subsequently being elected to two four-year terms.

Subject to term limits, he then ran for, and won, the District 47B seat in the House of Delegates. He served in the House of Delegates for nine months.

Campos resigned his House seat on September 10, 2015, for "personal reasons", citing "his recent marriage, desire to start a family and lack of employment outside the State House."

== Conviction ==
On January 5, 2017, Campos pleaded guilty to accepting about $40,000 to $50,000 in bribes and kickbacks in exchange for official favors. As part of the plea agreement, Campos was required to give up the money he collected in the scheme and pay restitution of at least $340,000. He also faced up 15 years in prison for the bribery and conspiracy charges. Campos was sentenced in May 2018 to 54 months in prison, to be followed by three years of supervised release. It was reported in June 2020 that amid the COVID-19 pandemic Campos was transferred to a halfway house in the Baltimore area to complete his sentence more than a year before his projected release date.

== Election results ==
=== 2004 ===
2004 Prince George's County Council General Election Results, District 2
Candidate	Votes	Party	Percentage
Will Campos	16,308	Democratic	88.5% (Winner)
Tommy S. Priestley	2,119	Republican	11.5%

=== 2006 ===
2006 Prince George's County Council General Election Results, District 2
Candidate	Votes	Party	Percentage
Will Campos	10,917	Democratic	97.9% (Winner)
Anthony Cicoria	159	Democratic (write in)	1.4%
Other Write-Ins	74		0.7%

=== 2010 ===
2010 Prince George's County Council Primary Election Results, District 2
Candidate	Votes	Party	Percentage
Will Campos	4,041	Democratic	78.8% (Winner)
Dottie McNeill	784	Democratic	15.3%
Sabrena Turner	305	Democratic	5.9%

2010 Prince George's County Council General Election Results, District 2
Candidate	Votes	Party	Percentage
Will Campos	11,198	Democratic	99.4% (Winner)
Other Write-Ins	67		0.6%

=== 2014 ===
2014 House of Delegates Primary Election Results, District 47B
Candidate	Votes	Party	Percentage
Will Campos	1,193	Democratic	100.0% (Winner)

2014 House of Delegates General Election Results, District 47B
Candidate	Votes	Party	Percentage
Will Campos	3,182	Democratic	99.3% (Winner)
Other Write-Ins	21		0.7%
