= Gwendolyn T. Britt =

American politician (1941-2008)

Member of the Maryland Senate from the 47th district
- In office January 8, 2003 – January 12, 2008
- Succeeded by: David C. Harrington

Personal details
- Born: November 29, 1941 Washington, D.C., United States
- Died: January 12, 2008 (aged 66) Lanham, Maryland, United States
- Party: Democratic

Gwendolyn T. Britt (November 29, 1941 – January 12, 2008) was a member of the Maryland State Senate, first elected in 2003, to represent District 47 in Prince George's County, Maryland, USA, winning with 99.4% of the vote. Britt died suddenly in January 2008 of natural causes.

Her district included the areas and towns of Adelphi, Buck Lodge, Langley Park, Chillum, Avondale, Ridgecrest, Carole Highlands, Brentwood, North Brentwood, Colmar Manor, Cottage City, Cheverly, Kentland, Bladensburg, Landover Hills, West Lanham Hills, and Lanham.

== Education ==
Britt graduated from McKinley High School, Washington, D.C. She received her B.S. in political science from Bowie State University.

== Career ==
Britt was a business office manager for AT&T from 1968 to 1984. She later held jobs as a real estate agent with Long & Foster Realtors from 1984 to 1988. Later, she was a human resources and personnel manager with Giant Food from 1988 to 2002. She made headlines in the 1960s when she was arrested at the Glen Echo Amusement Park for refusing to leave. She was one of five Howard University students who were plaintiffs in civil rights suits that were heard before the Supreme Court arguing for desegregation of the amusement park.

She was also a Freedom Rider in the 1960s and spent 40 days in jail in Jackson, Mississippi. She was also a voter registration volunteer in McComb, Mississippi, helping African Americans who had been denied the right to register to vote reportedly for inability to interpret the Constitution before white registrars.

In 2007, Britt co-sponsored a controversial bill, with State Delegate Justin Ross, to allow convicted released felons the right to vote, and became lead sponsor of a bill to legalize same-sex marriage in Maryland. The former bill successfully passed both the houses of the Maryland state legislature, however, she suddenly died of heart failure or stroke before the latter bill could be introduced. She was a member of the Legislative Black Caucus of Maryland, and chairman of the Prince George's County Senate Delegation.

== Death ==
Britt died on January 12, 2008, in Lanham.
