= Jimmy Tarlau =

American politician

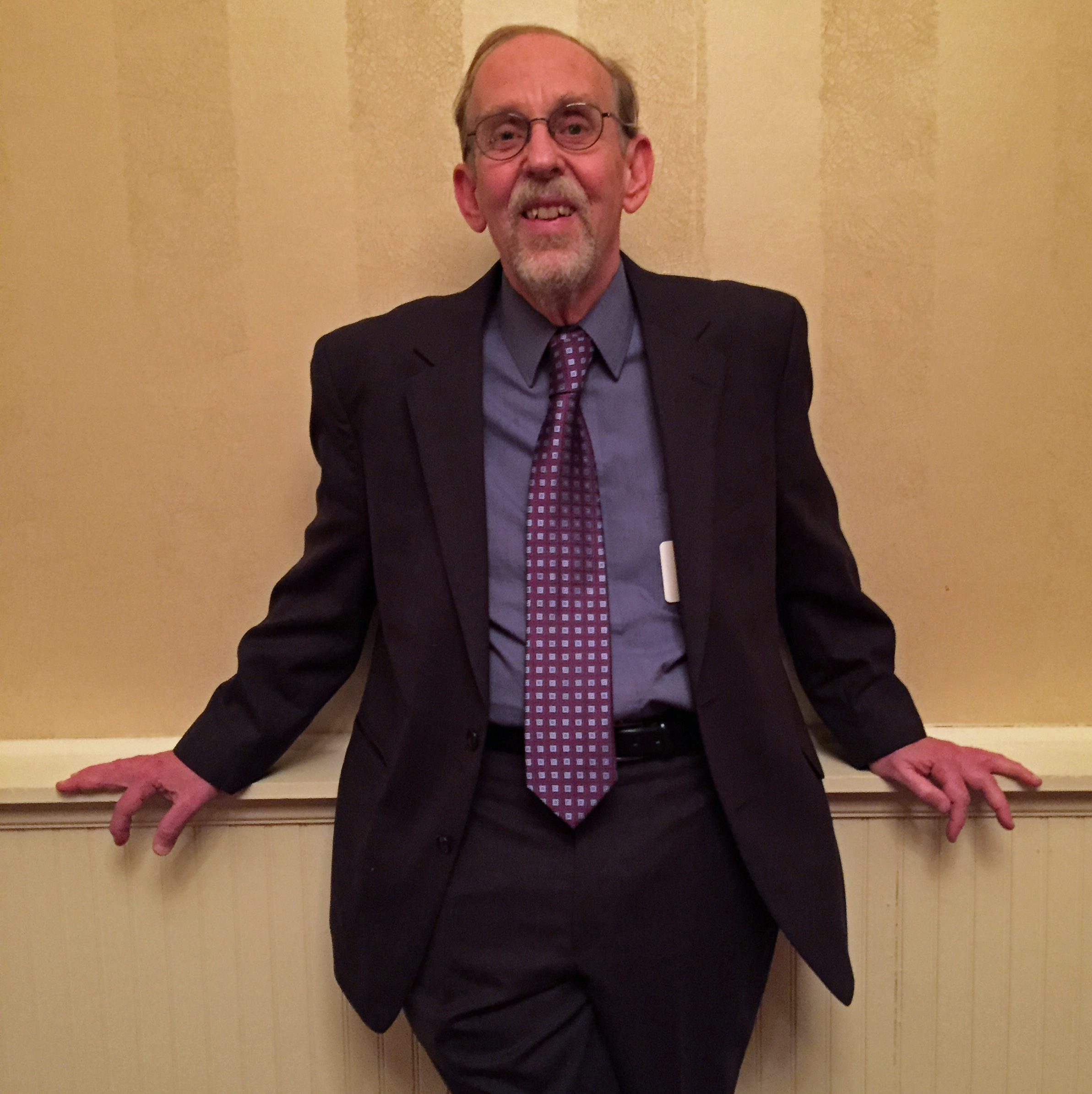
- Tarlau in 2014

Member of the Maryland House of Delegates from District 47A
- In office January 14, 2015 – January 2019
- Preceded by: Jolene Ivey
- Succeeded by: Julian Ivey
- Constituency: Prince George's County

Personal details
- Born: May 23, 1948 (age 78) New York City, New York, U.S.
- Party: Democratic
- Spouse: Jodi Beder
- Children: Ananta and Becky
- Education: Princeton University (A.B.)

James J. Tarlau (born May 23, 1948) is an American politician from Maryland, a retired union organizer, and a member of the Democratic Party. He was elected to represent District 47A in the Maryland House of Delegates in 2014 and served one term.

== Background ==
Tarlau was born and raised in New York City. He attended Princeton University, where he worked to "radicalize" the institution. He was suspended for protesting a visit from Nixon's Interior Secretary Wally Hickel in March 1970. He graduated with an A.B. in history the same year after completing a 158-page long senior thesis titled "Postwar Reaction and the Foreign Policy of the American Labor Movement" but the suspension prevented him from participating in graduation ceremonies with his class. After stints driving trucks and a cab, Tarlau earned a master's degree in computer science from Villanova University and another master's degree in Labor Relations from Rutgers University. He raised his family in New Jersey and worked to effect political change through union organizing. In 2000 he moved to Maryland, where he served eight years on the Mount Rainier, Maryland City Council and worked as assistant to the vice president of the Communications Workers of America. After winning the Democratic primary for a seat in District 47A of the Maryland House of Delegates, Tarlau retired from his union job.

== Politics ==
The Washington Post, Congresswoman Donna Edwards, Maryland Lt. Gov. Anthony Brown, Maryland State Sen. Joanne Benson and Maryland Del. Doyle Niemann endorsed Tarlau's campaign for the House. He ran on a progressive platform, including:

- Mandating the Geographic Cost of Education Index as a part of the state aid for education formula
- Promotion of clean energy job projects
- Passing a $15 minimum wage
- Changing the tax code so companies headquartered in other states have to pay taxes on their Maryland revenue (combined tax reporting)

When a Comcast lobbyist made news by saying publicly that the incoming class of legislators was "more anti-business" than their outgoing colleagues, Tarlau was one of 17 newly elected members of the House who signed a letter disputing the characterization.

== Legislative career ==
Tarlau was appointed to the Ways and Means Committee at the beginning of his first term in the House. His first legislative action was to introduce bill PG 417-15, which would require counties to reveal the criteria they use to calculate each municipality's tax differential.

== Election results ==
- 2014 Democratic primary election for the House of Delegates, District 47A.

Voters to choose two:

Name	Votes	Percent	Outcome
Jimmy Tarlau	2,728	26.7%	Won
Diana Fennell	2,416	23.7%	Won
Michael G. Summers, incumbent	1,740	17.0%	Lost
Malcolm Augustine	1,688	16.6%	Lost
Joseph Solomon	1,627	16%	Lost

- 2014 general election for the House of Delegates, District 47A.

Voters to choose two:

Name	Votes	Percent	Outcome
Diana Fennell, Dem.	11,198	52.2%	Won
Jimmy Tarlau, Dem.	8,836	41.2%	Won
Fred Price, Jr., Rep.	1,424	6.6%	Lost
