= Glenn Ivey =

American politician (born 1961)

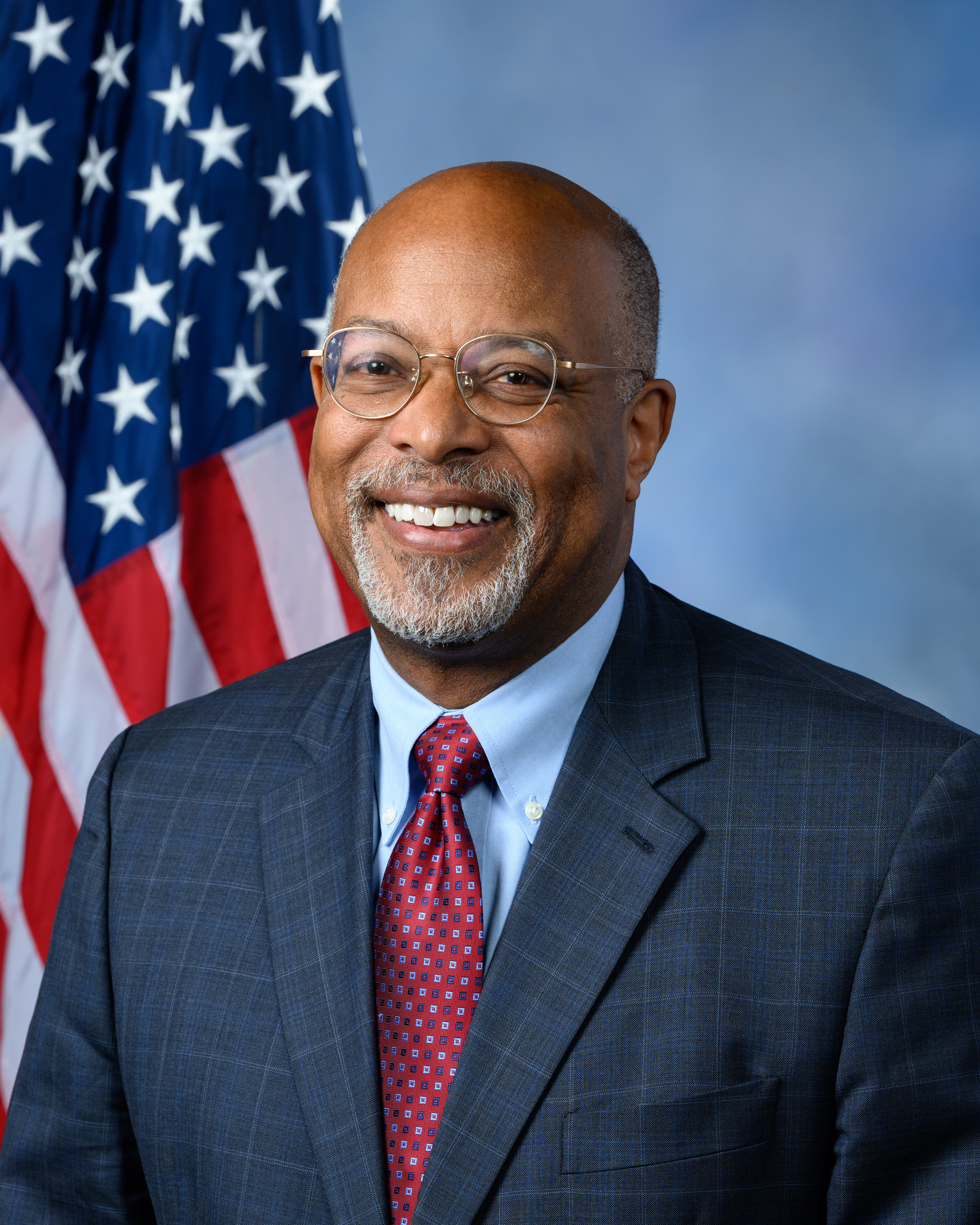
- Official portrait, 2022

Member of the U.S. House of Representatives from Maryland's 4th district
- Incumbent
- Assumed office January 3, 2023
- Preceded by: Anthony Brown

State's Attorney of Prince George's County
- In office January 6, 2003 – January 3, 2011
- Preceded by: Jack B. Johnson
- Succeeded by: Angela Alsobrooks

Chair of the Maryland Public Service Commission
- In office March 18, 1998 – October 31, 2000
- Governor: Parris Glendening
- Preceded by: Russell Frisby
- Succeeded by: Catherine Riley

Personal details
- Born: Glenn Frederick Ivey; February 27, 1961 (age 65) Chelsea, Massachusetts, U.S.
- Party: Democratic
- Spouse: Jolene Stephenson (m. 1988)
- Children: 6, including Julian
- Education: Princeton University (BA); Harvard University (JD)
- Website: House website Campaign website
- Ivey's voice Ivey opposing a House resolution. Recorded May 14, 2024

Glenn Frederick Ivey (born February 27, 1961) is an American politician and attorney serving as the U.S. representative for Maryland's 4th congressional district since 2023. The district covers most of the black-majority areas on the Maryland side of the Washington metropolitan area.

A partner at the law firm of Ivey & Levetown, he served as the state's attorney for Prince George's County, Maryland, from 2002 to 2011. Ivey won the 2022 Democratic primary for the 4th congressional district over Donna Edwards, who previously represented the district for four terms, and then defeated the Republican nominee. According to the Cook Partisan Voting Index, his district is tied with California's 12th for the second most Democratic in the country, with an index rating of D+39.

Ivey served on Capitol Hill as chief counsel to Senate majority leader Tom Daschle, as counsel to U.S. senator Paul Sarbanes during the Whitewater controversy, as chief majority counsel to the Senate Banking Committee, and on the staff of U.S. representative John Conyers. He also worked for U.S. attorney Eric Holder as an assistant U.S. attorney and as chair of the Maryland Public Service Commission. He was twice elected state's attorney for Prince George's County, Maryland.

== Early life and education ==
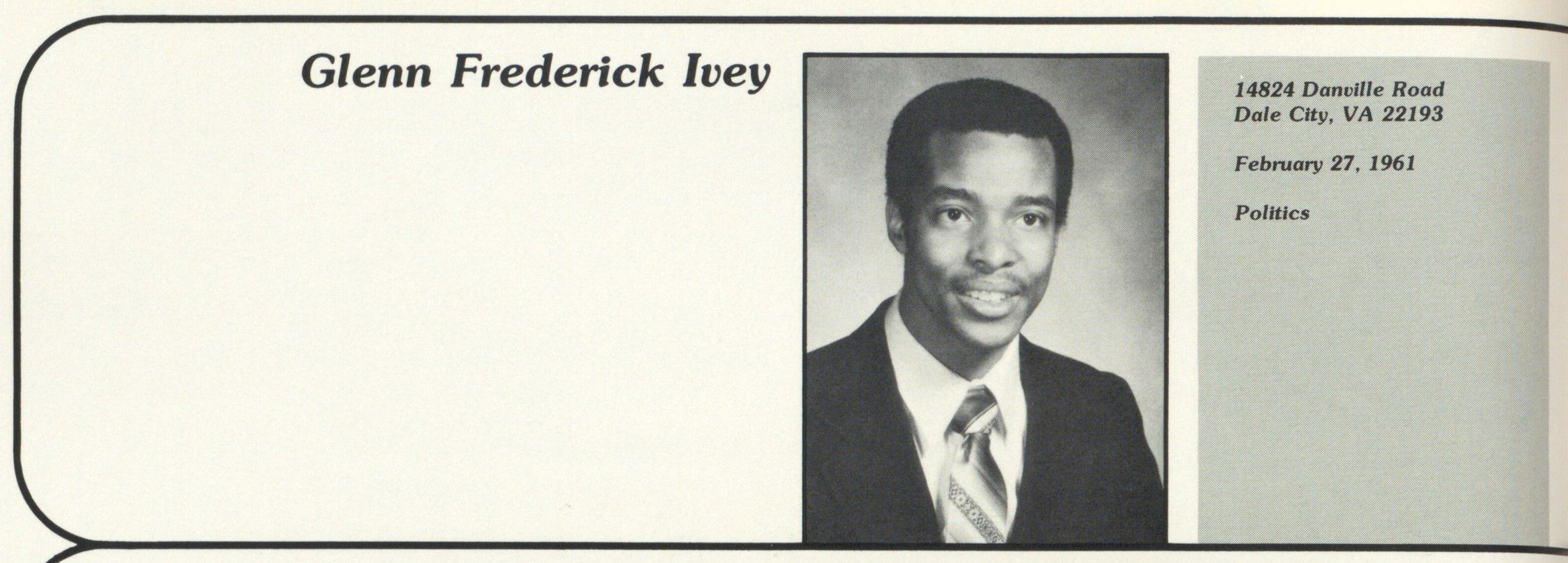
Ivey in the Princeton University yearbook, 1983

Ivey was born in Chelsea, Massachusetts, but grew up in Rocky Mount, North Carolina, where much of his extended family lived and his mother worked as the first Black teacher at an all-white school. His immediate family later moved to Dale City, Virginia, after his father got a job with the United States Department of Labor. Ivey graduated with honors from Princeton University, where he earned an A.B. degree in politics in 1983. In 1986, he received a J.D. degree from Harvard Law School.

== Early Career ==
After graduating from Harvard Law School in 1986, Ivey worked for the Baltimore law firm of Gordon-Feinblatt. From 1987 to 1988, he worked on Capitol Hill as an aide to U.S. representative John Conyers, after which he returned to law, working for Preston, Gates, Ellis & Rouvelas.

In 1989, the United States Department of Justice hired Ivey as an assistant U.S. attorney in Washington, D.C. He worked for U.S. Attorney for the District of Columbia Eric Holder. Afterward, Ivey returned to Capitol Hill to serve as majority counsel to U.S. Senate Banking Committee chairman Donald Riegle. From 1995 to 1997, he served as the counsel for senator Paul Sarbanes during the Senate Whitewater investigations and coordinated the Senate investigation into the suicide of Vince Foster. Eventually, Ivey served as chief counsel to Senate Democratic leader Tom Daschle until 1998.

In March 1998, Governor Parris Glendening named Ivey to serve as chairman of the Maryland Public Service Commission. As chairman, Ivey oversaw the deregulation of Maryland's electric power industry and helped the PSC determine how to monitor telephone services and foster competition in the telecommunications industry. On October 18, 2000, Ivey announced that he would resign from the PSC by the end of the month to become a partner at the K&L Gates law firm, and said he was contemplating a 2002 run for Prince George's county state's attorney.

Ivey ran for Prince George's county state's attorney in 2002, seeking to succeed outgoing state's attorney Jack B. Johnson. In the primary, he was endorsed by U.S. representative Albert Wynn, U.S. senator Paul Sarbanes, and The Washington Post. He defeated deputy state's attorney Mark Spencer in the primary with 60.0% of the vote. He ran unopposed in the general election.

Following the end of his second term as state's attorney, Ivey became a partner at Venable LLP before moving to a position as a partner at Leftwich & Ludaway, in Washington, D.C., from 2012 to 2017. Afterward, he was a partner at the District-based law firm Price Benowitz. In 2020, Ivey opened his own law firm, Ivey & Levetown, in Greenbelt, Maryland.

Ivey taught trial advocacy at Harvard Law School during winter sessions from 2013 to 2021 and was an adjunct professor at the University of Maryland School of Law from 1995 to 2014. He is a past president of the D.C. chapter of the Harvard Law School Association, a former chair of the Maryland Legal Services Corporation, and a former member of the D.C. Bar Association's board of governors.

In July 2020, Prince George's county executive Angela Alsobrooks appointed Ivey to serve as the chair of the county's police reform task force. During committee meetings, Ivey scrutinized policies surrounding pretextual traffic stops, which experts say can enable racial profiling and precipitate a police shooting. The committee released its final report on December 3, which included recommendations relating to community engagement, employee hiring and retention, police department finances, internal oversight, and standards and regulations.

Ivey is a member of The Sentencing Project's Board of Directors.

== Prince George's State's Attorney (2002–2011) ==
Ivey ran and was elected twice as state's attorney for Prince George's county and served from January 2003 to January 2011. In November 2009, he declined to run for Prince George's county executive or for a third term as state's attorney, instead forming an exploratory committee to look at challenging U.S. representative Donna Edwards in the 2010 elections. In January 2010, he decided against running for a third term or against Edwards, saying he wanted to return to the private sector after the end of his term.

When Ivey took office in December 2002, Prince George's county had the second-highest crime rate in Maryland. During his two terms as state's attorney, he oversaw reductions in crime and led reform measures that put cameras in police interrogation rooms and prosecuted officers accused of excessive force. He sought to involve community groups in crafting policies and strategies for tackling crime in the county and partnered with faith leaders to assist domestic violence survivors and to gain tougher sentences for convicted offenders.

In October 2002, following the arrest of D.C. snipers Lee Boyd Malvo and John Allen Muhammad, Ivey declined to prosecute them in his county because of their murder convictions in both Maryland and Virginia.

In 2005, Montgomery County Executive Doug Duncan said he considered Ivey as his running mate in the 2006 Maryland gubernatorial election. Ivey declined, running for re-election instead.

In July 2008, Ivey's office faced intense public scrutiny to hold someone accountable following the strangulation death of 19-year-old Ronnie White, who was accused of killing a police officer. In December, the grand jury involved in the death investigation had concluded its deliberations, determining that it had insufficient evidence to bring down indictments in the case. After a yearlong investigation, Ivey announced that there was no evidence to support murder charges against jail employees. The Department of Justice also reviewed the case and concluded that there was insufficient evidence to charge anyone with murder or manslaughter.

In August 2010, Ivey endorsed Angela Alsobrooks, the executive director of the Prince George's county revenue authority, to succeed him as Prince George's county state's attorney.

== U.S. House of Representatives (2023–present) ==
Ivey was sworn into the United States House of Representatives on January 3, 2023, succeeding Anthony Brown.

=== Elections ===
==== 2012 ====
In October 2011, Ivey said through a spokesperson that he was considering a run for the United States House of Representatives in Maryland's 4th congressional district, challenging the incumbent, Donna Edwards. He declared his candidacy on November 3, but dropped out in January 2012, saying he could not raise enough money for his campaign.

==== 2016 ====
In September 2015, Ivey announced that he would again run for the House of Representatives in Maryland's 4th congressional district, seeking to succeed Edwards, who unsuccessfully ran for United States Senate in 2016.

During the primary, Ivey was endorsed by former United States attorney general Eric Holder, Prince George's county executive Rushern Baker, state senator Victor R. Ramirez, and many municipal leaders. He also led his competitors, including former Maryland lieutenant governor Anthony Brown and state delegate Joseline Peña-Melnyk, in fundraising until the very end of the campaign.

The primary was held on April 26, 2016. Brown defeated Ivey, 41.6% to 34.0%, a margin of 8,712 votes out of 114,623 cast. Peña-Melnyk took 19.0%. Ivey worked as an attorney in private practice following his loss.

==== 2022 ====
On October 26, 2021, Ivey again declared his candidacy for the House of Representatives in Maryland's 4th congressional district, seeking to succeed outgoing three-term Democrat Anthony Brown, who ran for attorney general of Maryland in 2022. Redistricting after the 2020 census had preserved the 4th's longstanding heavy Democratic tint, and it was understood that whoever won the Democratic primary would be heavily favored in the general election.

During the primary, he was endorsed by The Washington Post, former Maryland governor Parris Glendening, former Prince George's county executive Rushern Baker, former Montgomery county executive Ike Leggett, and various municipal leaders. The United Democracy Project, a super PAC established by the American Israel Public Affairs Committee, spent $5.9 million on Ivey's campaign, while J Street spent $720,000 on former U.S. representative Donna Edwards's campaign. Ivey downplayed the help he received from AIPAC and its allies, telling The Post that while their support was "extremely helpful", voters in the district weren't especially concerned about Israel. The New York Times described the race as a "proxy fight over Israel".

Ivey turned a 13-point deficit into a five-point lead over Edwards by early June, weeks before United Democracy Project began running TV ads on June 17.

The primary was held on July 19, 2022. Ivey defeated Edwards, 51.8% to 35.2%, a margin of 13,677 votes out of 82,662 cast. Former state delegate Angela Angel took 5.7% of the vote.

Ivey won the general election on November 8, 2022, defeating Republican nominee Jeff Warner with over 90 percent of the vote, one of the largest margins for a Democrat facing major-party opposition.

==== 2024 ====
Ivey was reelected in 2024, winning nearly 90% of the vote against a Republican opponent.

==== 2026 ====
Ivey easily dispatched a leftwing challenge in the June Democratic primary, winning almost 80% of the vote against four opponents, to advance to the general election which he won.

=== Tenure ===
Ivey voted with President Joe Biden's stated position 96.2% of the time in the 118th Congress.

Ivey voted with President Donald Trump's stated position 10.5% of the time in the 119th Congress through 2025. The median House Democrat voted with President Trump 10% of the time.

On July 29, 2024, Ivey was announced as one of six Democratic members of a bipartisan task force investigating the attempted assassination of Donald Trump.

On March 19, 2025, Ivey became the first member of Congress to call for Chuck Schumer to step down as Senate Minority Leader, after Schumer allowed the Republican government funding bill to pass.

==== Committee assignments ====
119th Congress:

- Committee on Appropriations
  - Subcommittee on Commerce, Justice, Science, and Related Agencies
  - Subcommittee on Financial Services and General Government
- Committee on Ethics

118th Congress:

- Committee on Homeland Security
- Committee on the Judiciary
- Committee on Ethics

==== Caucus memberships ====
- Congressional Black Caucus
- Congressional Caucus for the Equal Rights Amendment
- Congressional Equality Caucus
- Bipartisan HBCU Caucus
- Bipartisan Artificial Intelligence Caucus
- Caucus on Homelessness
- Black Maternal Health Caucus
- High Tech Caucus
- Pro-Choice Caucus
- New Democrat Coalition
- Second Chance Task Force
- Democratic Faith Working Group
- Substance Abuse / Mental Health Task Force
- Gun Violence Prevention Task Force
- Sustainable Energy and Environment Coalition

== Political positions ==
=== Capital punishment ===
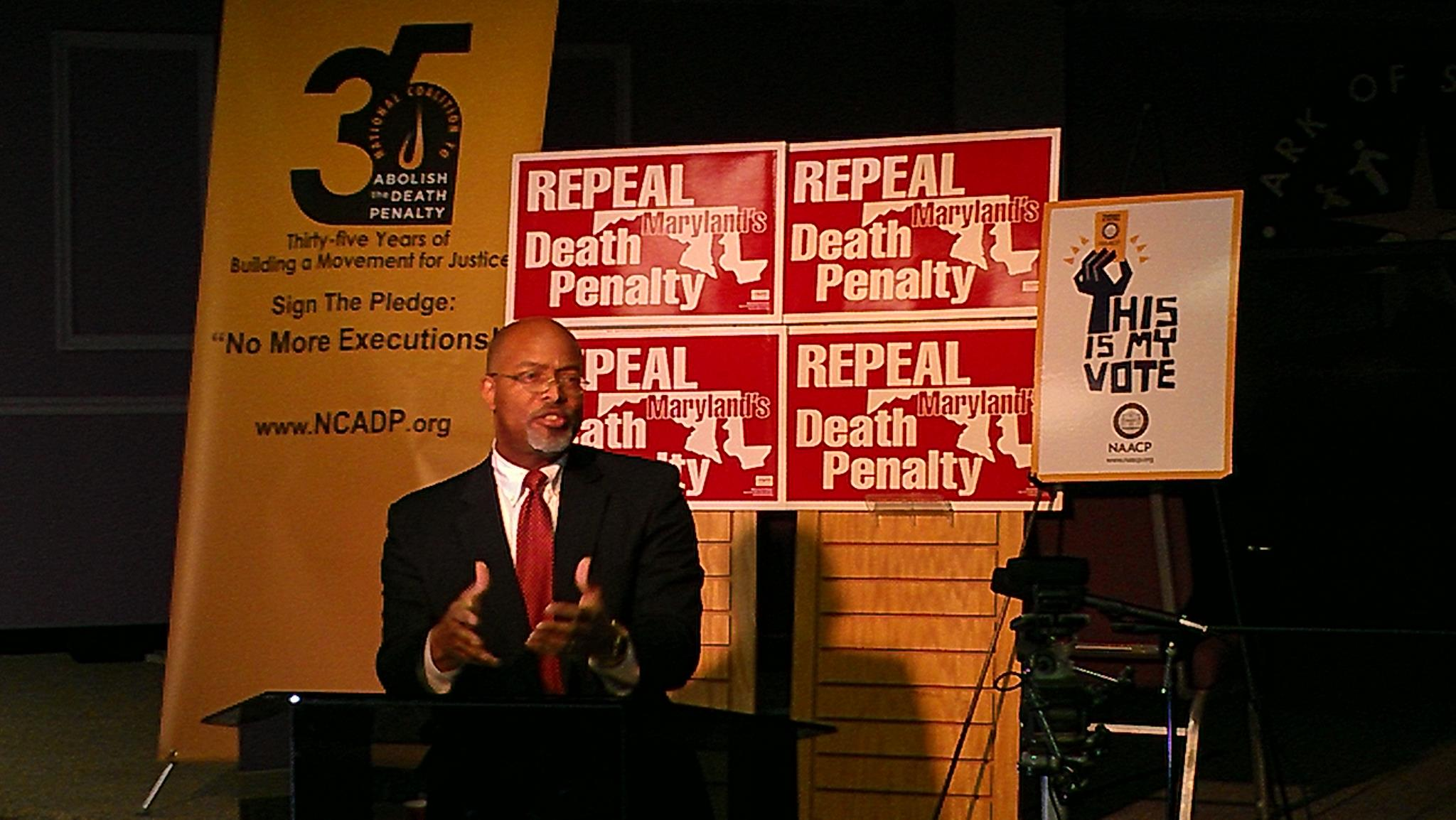
Ivey campaigning for the passage of a 2012 bill to end capital punishment in Maryland.

When Ivey first took office as state's attorney in 2002, he said he believed in using the death penalty. He sought the death penalty several times during his tenure as state's attorney, and said in November 2007 that he filed notice of his intent to seek death in case about once a year.

In February 2009, Ivey testified before the Maryland House of Delegates' Judicial Proceedings Committee that he had had a change of heart during his time as state's attorney, particularly because of the effect the process had on victims' families. In January 2012, he called the death penalty a "political tool". Ahead of the 2013 legislative session, Ivey pushed for a bill that would repeal the death penalty in Maryland, which became law.

=== Environment ===
In July 2022, an Ivey campaign aide told Environment & Energy Publishing that Ivey supported the Green New Deal and a quick transition away from fossil fuels.

=== Foreign policy ===
==== Iran ====
Ivey opposes the Iran nuclear deal negotiated by the Obama administration in 2015. In December 2021, he said he wanted a commitment to "full and neutral inspections [of Iranian nuclear sites]" and an end to Iran's funding of Hamas and Hezbollah before the U.S. reenters the deal. In February 2026, Ivey criticized U.S. and Israeli strikes on Iran, citing Trump's campaign promises to end U.S. involvement in foreign wars and describing the attack as a distraction from domestic issues such as the cost of living, the economy, and the Epstein files.

==== Israel ====
In 2006, Ivey traveled to Israel with other local elected officials on a Jewish Community Relations Council trip. He took two trips between September 2023 and October 2024 organized by AIPAC.

Ivey supports a two-state solution to the Israeli–Palestinian conflict and "Israel's right to exist and defend itself". In December 2021, he said he would vote to fund Israel's Iron Dome missile-defense system and opposed placing conditions on U.S. foreign aid to Israel to leverage components of negotiations about a two-state solution.

Ivey opposes the Boycott, Divestment, and Sanctions (BDS) movement against Israel.

He voted to provide Israel with support following 2023 Hamas attack on Israel.

On July 15, 2026, Ivey voted for an amendment that would have blocked $3.3 billion in annual U.S. security assistance to Israel and barred other funding in the appropriations bill from being used for Israel. The amendment failed 104-314, but was supported by 103 Democrats, compared with 98 Democrats opposed and 10 voting present, reflecting a broader division within the party over U.S. support for Israel. In a statement following the vote, Ivey described the amendment as overly broad but said the U.S.–Israel relationship required a “reset.” He cited the Netanyahu government’s conduct in Gaza, settler violence in the West Bank, and the risk of wider regional conflict, while continuing to support defensive assistance such as Iron Dome. He also called for increased humanitarian aid, accountability for settler violence, and the reconstruction of Gaza.

==== Venezuela ====
In January 2026, Ivey opposed U.S. military strikes in Venezuela and the subsequent capture of Venezuelan president Nicolás Maduro, saying that the Trump administration "has no coherent plan for Venezuela and no credible justification for taking over a sovereign country".

=== Gun policy ===
As state's attorney, Ivey sought increased sentences for gun offenders, targeting those who carry or store guns illegally, regardless of whether the weapon is used in crimes or if the person charged is a first-time offender. He also said he supported the "Boston Strategy" for youth violence, which involves targeting gangs and prosecuting all offenders tied to a crime to get long sentences. In March 2008, Ivey joined an amicus curae brief in the U.S. Supreme Court case District of Columbia v. Heller in support of the District of Columbia's handgun ban. In March 2010, he signed onto an amicus curae written by the Association of Prosecuting Attorneys for the U.S. Supreme Court in McDonald v. Chicago.

In December 2015, Ivey released a gun safety plan. Ivey's plan called for universal background checks and expanded gun dealership inspections, a ban on assault rifles and high-capacity magazines, and increased funding for the Bureau of Alcohol, Tobacco, Firearms and Explosives.

In April 2023, Ivey introduced his first bill, the Raise The Age Act, which would raise the legal age to buy a semi-automatic rifle or shotgun from 18 to 21.

=== Healthcare ===
Ivey supports Medicare for All and the legalization of recreational marijuana. In June 2024, Ivey signed onto a Maryland Healthcare for All pledge to support legislation to extend Inflation Reduction Act-provided healthcare benefits beyond 2025.

=== Police funding ===
During his 2022 campaign, Ivey said he would seek to tie federal police funding to departments serious about rethinking policing tactics. He also said he would be willing to work with police to fight crime while "holding accountable" officers engaged in misconduct. He does not support the "Defund the Police" movement, arguing that it damaged Democrats electorally and served as a "distraction" from real issues.

=== Redistricting ===
In April 2026, Ivey criticized the U.S. Supreme Court's ruling in Louisiana v. Callais and called for the passage of the John Lewis Voting Rights Act in response to it.

=== Social issues ===
In October 2012, Ivey appeared in an ad to support Question 6, a referendum to support the legalization of same-sex marriage in Maryland.

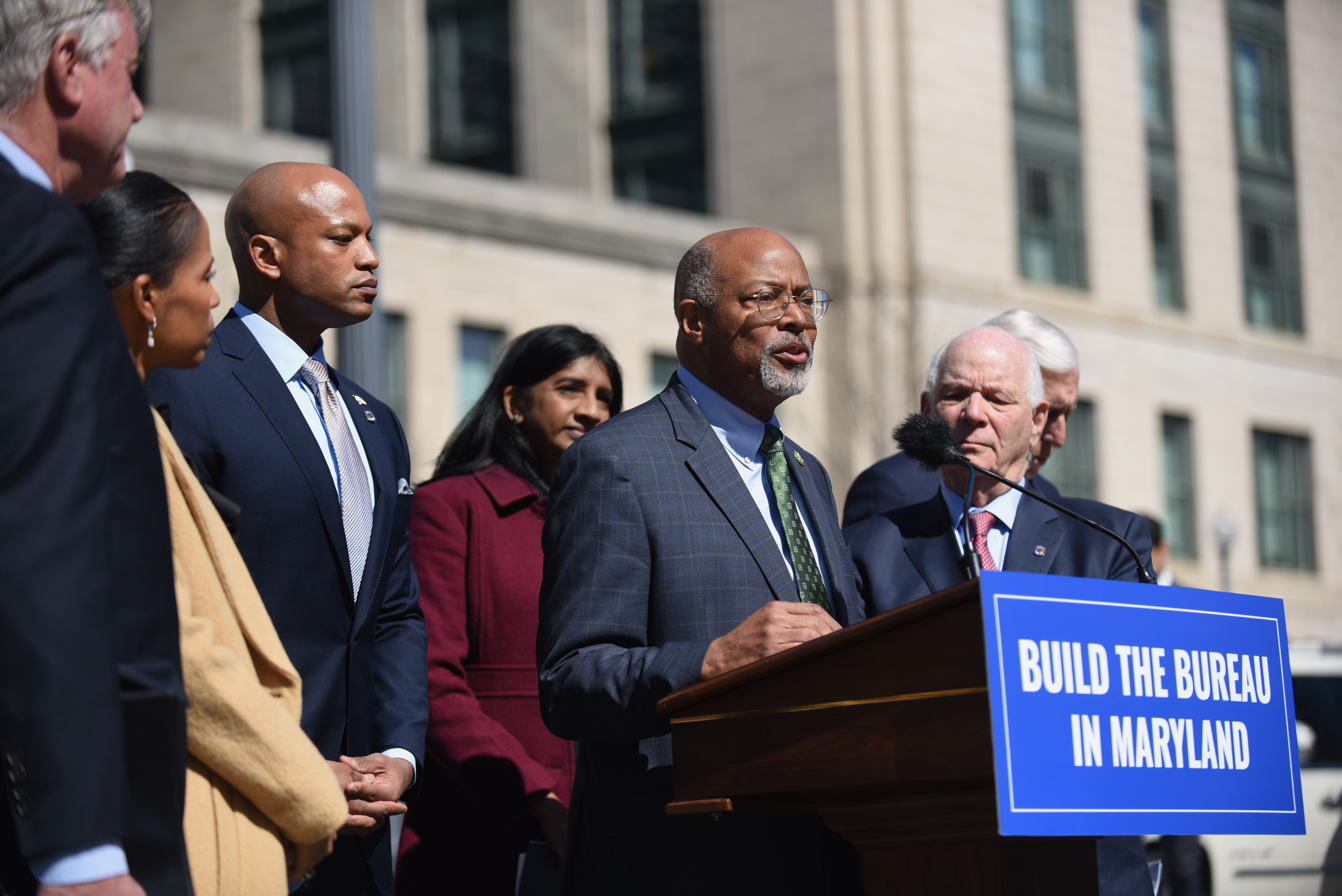
Ivey speaks at a press conference to support building the new FBI Headquarters in Prince George's County, 2023.

In November 2022, Ivey said he supported bringing the new Federal Bureau of Investigation headquarters to Prince George's County, later citing it as one of his top priorities. In March 2023, Ivey joined other Democratic members of Maryland's congressional delegation, Governor Wes Moore, and Prince George's County Executive Angela Alsobrooks in co-signing a letter to President Joe Biden asking him to get involved in the FBI's headquarters selection process. In November 2023, the General Services Administration announced that it would locate the FBI's new headquarters in Greenbelt, Maryland. In March 2025, however, President Donald Trump blocked the FBI's move to Maryland, saying that the agency should be located in Washington, D.C., as opposed to "liberal" Maryland. In July 2025, after Trump said that he wanted the new FBI headquarters to be the Ronald Reagan Building and International Trade Center in Washington, D.C., Ivey signed onto a letter saying that they would "be fighting back against this proposal with every tool we have".

In September 2025, Ivey was one of 58 Democrats to vote against a resolution honoring the life of Charlie Kirk following his assassination, pointing to comments Kirk had made attacking the Civil Rights Act of 1964 and criticizing Martin Luther King Jr.

== Electoral history ==
Prince George's County State's Attorney Democratic primary election, 2002
Party	Candidate	Votes	%
Democratic	Glenn F. Ivey	57,696	60.0
Democratic	Mark Spencer	38,417	40.0

Prince George's County State's Attorney election, 2002
Party	Candidate	Votes	%
Democratic	Glenn F. Ivey	165,749	99.7
Write-in		548	0.3

Prince George's County State's Attorney Democratic primary election, 2006
Party	Candidate	Votes	%
Democratic	Glenn F. Ivey	92,047	100.0

Prince George's County State's Attorney election, 2006
Party	Candidate	Votes	%
Democratic	Glenn F. Ivey	184,257	99.7
Write-in		614	0.3

Maryland's 4th congressional district Democratic primary election, 2016
Party	Candidate	Votes	%
Democratic	Anthony Brown	47,678	41.6
Democratic	Glenn F. Ivey	38,966	34.0
Democratic	Joseline Peña-Melnyk	21,724	19.0
Democratic	Warren Christopher	3,973	3.5
Democratic	Matthew Fogg	1,437	1.3
Democratic	Terence Strait	845	0.7

Maryland's 4th congressional district Democratic primary election, 2022
Party	Candidate	Votes	%
Democratic	Glenn Ivey	42,791	51.8
Democratic	Donna Edwards	29,114	35.2
Democratic	Angela Angel	4,678	5.7
Democratic	Tammy Allison	1,726	2.1
Democratic	Kim A. Shelton	1,354	1.6
Democratic	Gregory Holmes	1,024	1.2
Democratic	James Curtis Jr.	763	0.9
Democratic	Matthew Fogg	663	0.8
Democratic	Robert K. McGhee	549	0.7

Maryland's 4th congressional district election, 2022
Party	Candidate	Votes	%
Democratic	Glenn Ivey	144,168	90.1
Republican	Jeff Warner	15,441	9.6
Write-in		400	0.3

Maryland's 4th congressional district Democratic primary election, 2024
Party	Candidate	Votes	%
Democratic	Glenn Ivey	66,659	84.9
Democratic	Gabriel Njinimbot	4,366	5.6
Democratic	Emmett Johnson	3,835	4.9
Democratic	Joseph Gomes	3,673	4.7

Maryland's 4th congressional district election, 2024
Party	Candidate	Votes	%
Democratic	Glenn Ivey (incumbent)	239,596	88.4
Republican	George McDermott	30,454	11.2
Write-in		920	0.3

Maryland's 4th congressional district Democratic primary election, 2026
Party	Candidate	Votes	%
Democratic	Glenn Ivey (incumbent)	60,099	79.2
Democratic	Jakeya Johnson	8,475	11.2
Democratic	Shavonne N. Hedgepeth	3,697	4.9
Democratic	Jonathan D. White	1,814	2.4
Democratic	Joseph Gomes	1,793	2.4
Total votes		75,878	100.0

== Personal life ==
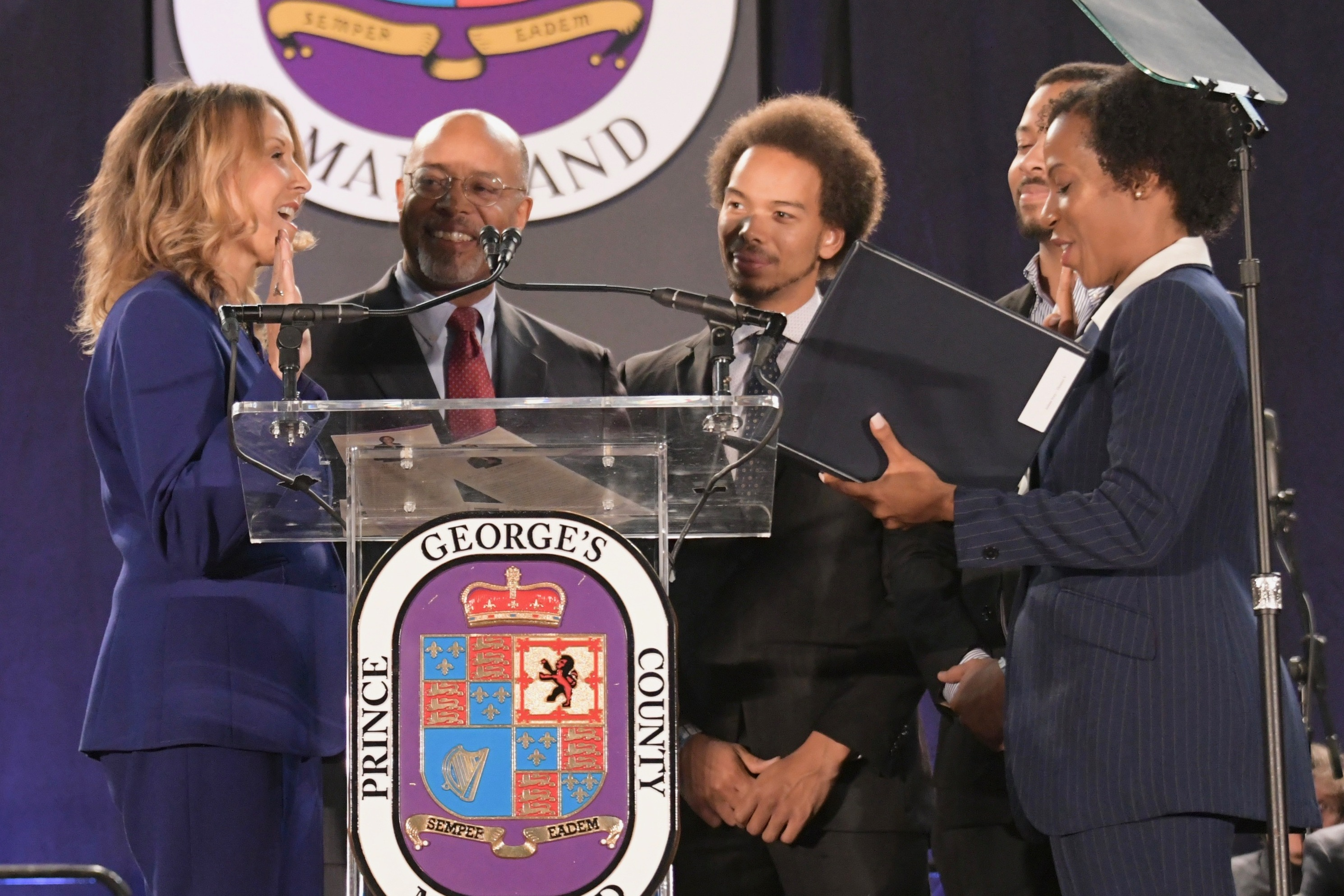
Ivey at the swearing in of his wife Jolene Ivey with two of his sons, including Julian Ivey

Ivey met his future wife, Jolene Stephenson, through a mutual friend who attended Stephenson's high school and Ivey's law school. They have been married since 1988, have five children—including Maryland delegate Julian Ivey—and live in Cheverly, Maryland. Ivey also has another daughter from a previous relationship. He is a Protestant.

In February 2004, Ivey took a leave of absence of several weeks to undergo surgery to remove a bean-sized cancer tumor on his kidney. His doctors told him that the cancer was detected early and his chances of a full recovery were good. He has been cancer-free since.

== See also ==
- List of African-American United States representatives

U.S. House of Representatives
Preceded by Anthony Brown	Member of the U.S. House of Representatives from Maryland's 4th congressional district 2023–present	Incumbent
U.S. order of precedence (ceremonial)
Preceded by Wesley Hunt	United States representatives by seniority 317th	Succeeded by Jonathan Jackson
