= Michael G. Summers =

American politician

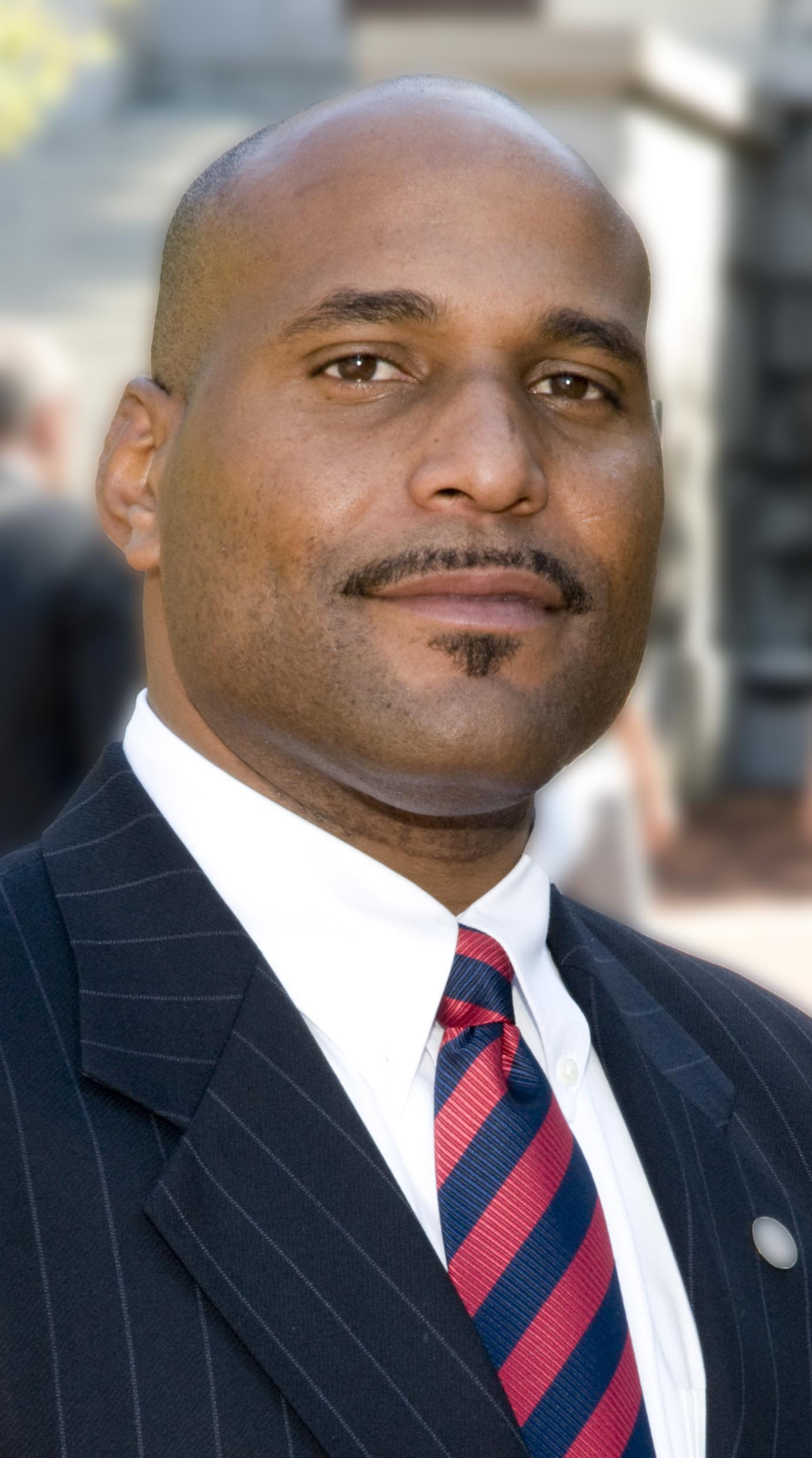

Member of the Maryland House of Delegates from the 47th district
- In office January 12, 2011 – January 14, 2015
- Preceded by: Victor R. Ramirez
- Succeeded by: Diana Fennell in District 47A

Personal details
- Born: November 19, 1972 (age 53) Cheverly, Maryland
- Party: Democratic
- Spouse: Marisa

Michael G. Summers (born November 19, 1972) is a former state delegate for District 47 in Prince George's County, Maryland, elected in 2010 and then defeated during the 2014 Democratic primary. He was born in and he lived in Cheverly, Maryland.

== Education ==
Summers graduated from Eastern Guilford High School in Gibsonville, North Carolina. He received his B.A. (history) from North Carolina Agricultural and Technical State University in 1997.

== Career ==
=== In the legislature ===
Serving in Prince George's County delegation from January 12, 2011, to January 14, 2015, Summers was a member of Legislative Black Caucus of Maryland, the Green Caucus and the Ways and Means Committee.

== Past elections ==
- 2010 Race for Maryland House of Delegates – 47th District

Voters to choose three:

| Name | Votes | Percent | Outcome |
|---|---|---|---|
| Jolene Ivey, Democratic | 14,404 | 35.4% | Won |
| Michael G. Summers, Democratic | 12,337 | 30.3% | Won |
| Doyle L. Niemann, Democratic | 11,925 | 29.3% | Won |
| Rachel Audi, Republican | 1,853 | 4.6% | |
| Anthony Cicoria, Democratic (Write in) | 63 | 0.2% | |
| Other write-ins | 87 | 0.2% | |

- 2014 Race for Maryland House of Delegates – 47A District (Democratic Primary)

Voters to choose two:

| Name | Votes | Percent | Outcome |
|---|---|---|---|
| Jimmy Tarlau, Democratic | 2,728 | 26.7% | Won |
| Diana Fennell, Democratic | 2,416 | 23.7% | Won |
| Michael Summers (Incumbent), Democratic | 1,740 | 17.1% | |
| Malcolm Augustine, Democratic | 1,688 | 16.6% | |
| Joseph Solomon, Democratic | 1,627 | 16% | |
