= Victor R. Ramirez =

Attorney and American politician

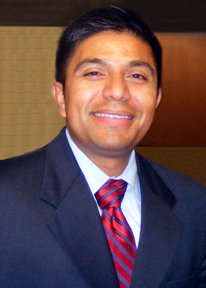
- Ramirez in 2007

Member-elect of the Prince George's County Council from the 2nd district
- Assuming office December 7, 2026
- Succeeding: Wanika B. Fisher

Member of the Maryland Senate from the 47th district
- In office January 12, 2011 – January 9, 2019
- Preceded by: David C. Harrington
- Succeeded by: Malcolm Augustine

Member of the Maryland House of Delegates from the 47A district
- In office January 8, 2003 – January 11, 2011
- Preceded by: Brian K. McHale (47A); Timothy D. Murphy (47A); Thomas E. Dewberry (47B)
- Succeeded by: Michael G. Summers

Personal details
- Born: July 20, 1974 (age 52) San Salvador, El Salvador
- Party: Democratic
- Spouse: Betsy Ramirez
- Children: 2

Victor R. Ramirez (born July 20, 1974) is an American politician who is a member-elect of the Prince George's County Council from the 2nd district. A member of the Democratic Party, he was a member of the Maryland Senate representing the 47th district from 2011 to 2019. He also previously represented District 47A in the Maryland House of Delegates from 2003 to 2011. Ramirez is the first Latino to be elected to the Maryland General Assembly.

== Early life and education ==
Ramirez was born in San Salvador, El Salvador, on July 20, 1974. His parents worked as a mechanic and a maintenance worker. His family moved to the United States from El Salvador when Ramirez was six years old. Ramirez graduated from Northwestern High School in Hyattsville, Maryland in 1992, where he played soccer. He attended Frostburg State University, where he earned a Bachelor of Arts in international business in 1996, and St. Thomas University, where he earned a Juris Doctor degree in 2001.

== Career ==
Ramirez taught English classes for non-English speaking adults from 2001 to 2002. He was admitted to the Maryland Bar in 2001, afterwards starting his own law office.

=== Maryland General Assembly ===
Ramirez was elected to the Maryland House of Delegates in 2002, becoming the first Latino elected to the Maryland General Assembly. He was sworn into the Maryland House of Delegates on January 8, 2003. He was a member of the Ways and Means Committee from 2003 to 2006, afterwards serving on the Judiciary Committee until 2011. From 2007 to 2011, Ramirez served as a deputy majority whip. During the 2008 Democratic Party presidential primaries, he ran to be a delegate at the 2008 Democratic National Convention, pledged to U.S. Senator John Edwards.

Ramirez was elected to the Maryland Senate in 2010 after defeating incumbent state senator David C. Harrington in that year's Democratic primary. was sworn into the Maryland Senate on January 12, 2011. He was a member of the Judicial Proceedings from 2011 to 2012, afterwards serving on the Finance Committee until 2015, when he returned to the Judicial Proceedings Committee. He was also a delegate to the 2012 Democratic National Convention, pledged to President Barack Obama. In February 2015, Ramirez joined state delegates David Fraser-Hidalgo, Joseline Peña-Melnyk, Maricé Morales, Will Campos, and Ana Sol Gutierrez in organizing the Maryland Latino Legislative Caucus, becoming one of the caucus' first six members.

On August 20, 2017, Ramirez announced that he would not run for re-election in 2018, opting instead to run for Prince George's County state's attorney. During his campaign, Ramirez supported decreasing arrests for low-level crimes, such as petty theft and marijuana possession, and create more county diversion programs. He received endorsements from former Prince George's County state's attorney Glenn Ivey, U.S. Representative Jamie Raskin, and Service Employees International Union 32BJ. Ramirez lost to former state delegate Aisha Braveboy in the Democratic primary, placing second with 27% of the vote.

=== Post-legislative career ===
In 2016, Ramirez became Northwestern High School's soccer coach. He was named coach of the year by The Washington Post in 2021, after leading his alma mater to the school's third state championship win over Northwest High School. During its 2022 season, the team entered the postseason as the undefeated champion of Prince George's County, but was eliminated in the semifinals after it was discovered that the team was using an ineligible player. Ramirez said that he and his coaching staff were unaware of the ineligibility and wished that the whistleblower who reported his team had approached him directly so that he could've reported it to officials directly instead of having their team eliminated.

In January 2020, Ramirez filed to run to be a delegate at the 2020 Democratic National Convention, pledged to U.S. Senator Elizabeth Warren.

In March 2021, Ramirez announced that he would run for the Prince George's County Council in 2022, seeking to succeed Deni Taveras, who was term-limited. He narrowly lost to state delegate Wanika B. Fisher in the Democratic primary, placing second with 44.8% of the vote.

In 2026, Ramirez again ran the Prince George's County Council in District 2, seeking to succeed Fisher, who ran unsuccessfully for Prince George's County state's attorney. He won the Democratic primary on June 23, 2026, with 62.7 percent of the vote and is running in the general election unopposed.

== Political positions ==
=== Crime and policing ===
During the 2013 legislative session, Ramirez supported repealing the death penalty in Maryland, citing statistics showing that Maryland has been more likely to impose the death penalty in cases involving Black assailants and white victms.

=== Education ===
During his tenure in the Maryland House of Delegates, Ramirez repeatedly introduced legislation to extend in-state tuition to undocumented students. The bill passed in 2003, when it was vetoed by Governor Bob Ehrlich, and again in 2011, when it was signed into law by Governor Martin O'Malley. After the legislation was petitioned to a statewide referendum by state delegate Neil Parrott, Ramirez held rallies in support of the legislation.

=== Gun control ===
During the 2018 legislative session and following the 2017 Las Vegas shooting, Ramirez introduced legislation to ban bump stocks in Maryland.

=== Immigration ===
Ramirez support issuing driver's licenses to undocumented immigrants. During the 2013 legislative session, he introduced the Maryland Highway Safety Act, which passed and was signed into law by Governor O'Malley.

During the 2017 legislative session, Ramirez introduced the Trust Act, which would prohibit police and sheriff's departments from complying with federal requests to hold undocumented immigrants.

=== Social issues ===
In May 2005, Ramirez and state delegate Ana Sol Gutierrez called on Governor Ehrlich to rescind the appointment of William G. Duvall Jr. as head of a panel responsible for interviewing judicial candidates on the lower Eastern Shore of Maryland, citing his use of an ethnic slur to describe undocumented immigrants. Ehrlich withdrew Duvall's appointment and condemned his use of the slur.

During the 2006 legislative session, Ramirez introduced a bill that would require Maryland to set aside at least $7 million in the state's Medicaid budget to cover low-income pregnant women and children who are legal immigrants but do not qualify for federal money.

During the 2011 legislative session, Ramirez supported the Civil Marriage Protection Act, which would legalize same-sex marriage in Maryland.

In 2015, Ramirez was appointed as the Senate chair of the Death with Dignity Work Group. During the 2015 legislative session, he expressed concerns with the Death With Dignity Act, a bill that would allow terminally ill adults in Maryland to take their own lives, citing testimony from the bill's opponents who argued that poor people and people with disabilities could opt to end their lives early because of the costs associated with their treatments.

== Personal life ==
Ramirez is married to his wife, Betsy, and has two children. He is a parishioner at St. Ambrose Catholic Church in Cheverly, Maryland.

== Electoral history ==
2002 Maryland House of Delegates 47th district election
Primary election
Party	Candidate	Votes	%
Democratic	Rosetta C. Parker	3,584	17.2
Democratic	Doyle Niemann	3,521	16.9
Democratic	Victor R. Ramirez	3,054	14.6
Democratic	Diana M. Fennell	2,724	13.1
Democratic	Bob McGrory	2,298	11.0
Democratic	Lee P. Walker	2,229	10.7
Democratic	Lillian K. Beverly	1,808	8.7
Democratic	Fred Price Jr.	1,316	6.3
Democratic	Theodore N. Pantazes	323	1.5
Total votes		20,857	100.0
General election
Democratic	Rosetta C. Parker	12,134	34.8
Democratic	Doyle Niemann	11,406	32.7
Democratic	Victor R. Ramirez	11,284	32.3
Write-in		90	0.3
Total votes		34,914	100.0

2006 Maryland House of Delegates 47th district election
Primary election
Party	Candidate	Votes	%
Democratic	Victor R. Ramirez (incumbent)	5,797	31.3
Democratic	Jolene Ivey	5,653	30.5
Democratic	Doyle Niemann (incumbent)	3,881	20.9
Democratic	Rosetta C. Parker (incumbent)	3,209	17.3
Total votes		18,540	100.0
General election
Democratic	Jolene Ivey	12,860	35.3
Democratic	Victor R. Ramirez (incumbent)	12,231	33.6
Democratic	Doyle Niemann (incumbent)	11,229	30.8
Write-in		120	0.3
Total votes		36,440	100.0

2010 Maryland Senate 47th district election
Primary election
Party	Candidate	Votes	%
Democratic	Victor R. Ramirez	4,532	63.6
Democratic	David C. Harrington (incumbent)	2,596	36.4
Total votes		7,128	100.0
General election
Democratic	Victor R. Ramirez	15,548	98.9
Write-in		169	1.1
Total votes		15,717	100.0

2014 Maryland Senate 47th district election
Primary election
Party	Candidate	Votes	%
Democratic	Victor R. Ramirez (incumbent)	4,981	68.4
Democratic	Walter Lee James, Jr.	2,296	31.6
Total votes		7,277	100.0
General election
Democratic	Victor Ramirez (incumbent)	15,582	99.0
Write-in		160	1.0
Total votes		15,742	100.0

2018 Prince George's County State's Attorney Democratic primary election
Party	Candidate	Votes	%
Democratic	Aisha Braveboy	78,320	62.8
Democratic	Victor R. Ramirez	33,653	27.0
Democratic	D. Michael Lyles	12,680	10.2
Total votes		124,653	100.0

2022 Prince George's County Council 2nd district Democratic primary election
Party	Candidate	Votes	%
Democratic	Wanika B. Fisher	3,620	50.9
Democratic	Victor R. Ramirez	3,187	44.8
Democratic	Raymond Nevo	306	4.3
Total votes		7,113	100.0

2026 Prince George's County Council 2nd district Democratic primary election
Party	Candidate	Votes	%
Democratic	Victor R. Ramirez	3,819	62.7
Democratic	Daniel A. Jones	2,268	37.2
Total votes		6,087	100.0
