= Doyle Niemann =

American politician (1947–2024)

Doyle L. Niemann
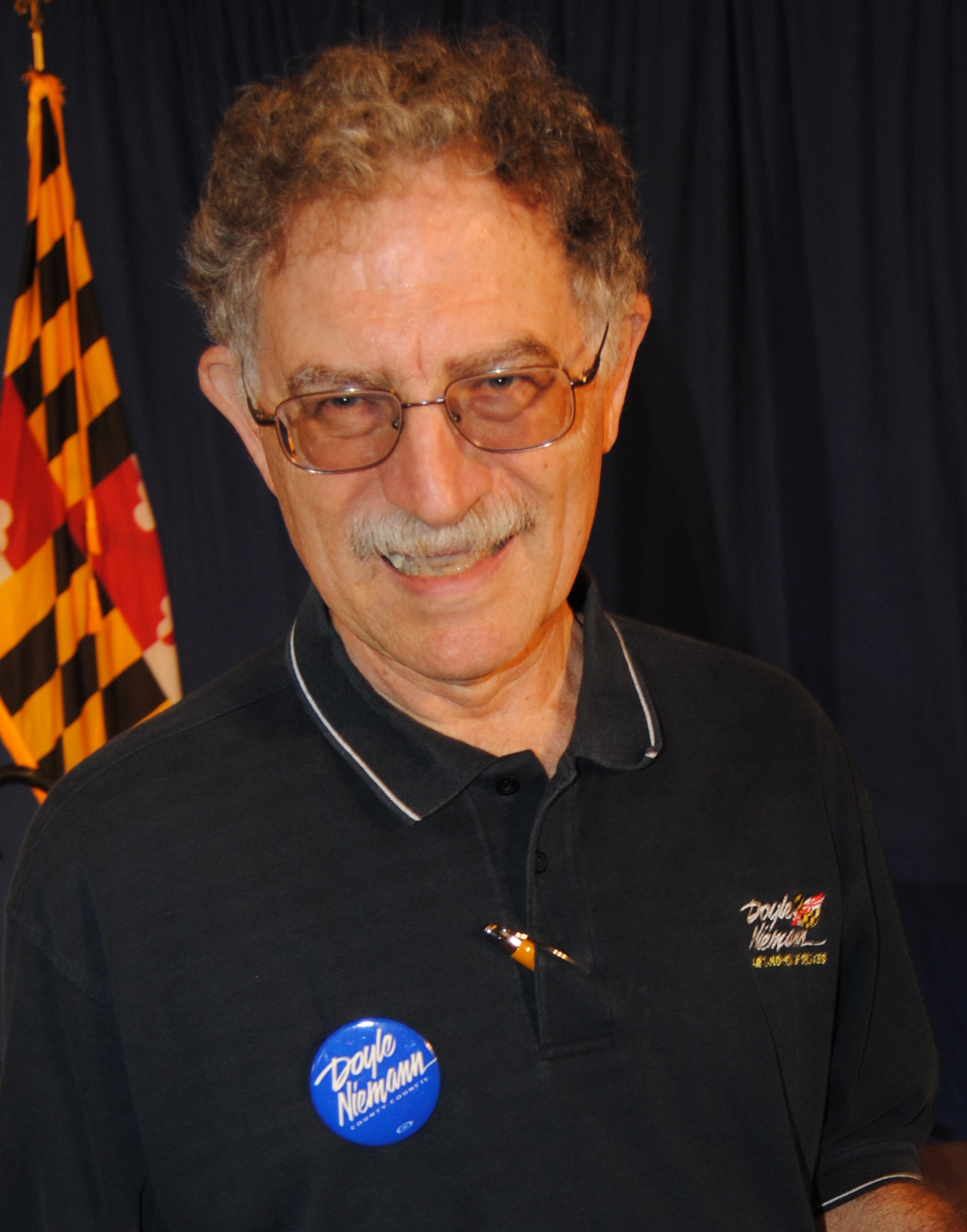

Member of the Maryland House of Delegates from the 47th district
- In office January 8, 2003 – January 14, 2015
- Preceded by: William H. Cole IV
- Succeeded by: Will Campos as District 47B

Personal details
- Born: March 19, 1947 Grand Island, Nebraska, U.S.
- Died: May 1, 2024 (aged 77) Washington, D.C., U.S.
- Party: Democratic
- Occupation: Attorney
- Member, City Council, Mount Rainier, Maryland 1983–1987

Doyle L. Niemann (March 19, 1947 – May 1, 2024) was an American prosecutor, public administrator, and politician who represented District 47 in the Maryland House of Delegates from 2003 to 2015. He was the Chief of Operations for the Prince George's County State's Attorney's Office in the administration of State's Attorney Aisha Braveboy.

== Background ==
Niemann was born in Grand Island, Nebraska, on March 19, 1947. He was a Regents Scholar at the University of Nebraska where he attended from 1965 to 1967. He then graduated from the University of Texas with a B.A. in government in 1969 and was a member of the Phi Beta Kappa honor society. Teaching fellowship, Graduate School of Government, University of Texas, 1970. University of Maryland School of Law, J.D., 1997 (Order of Coif; Editor, Maryland Law Review). He was admitted to the Maryland Bar in 1997. An Assistant State's Attorney for Prince George's County since 1998, Delegate Niemann specialized in prosecuting economic and white-collar crimes. He previously served on the Mount Rainier City Council (1983–1987), the Maryland Democratic Committee (1986–1990), and the Prince George's County Board of Education (1996–2002).

== In the legislature ==
Member of House of Delegates since January 8, 2003. Member, Environmental Matters Committee, 2007- (environment subcommittee, 2007-; housing & real property subcommittee, 2007-; natural resources subcommittee, 2007-; chair, ground rent work group, 2007-).

Niemann was instrumental in legislation addressing consumer economic issues including the 2005 enactment of the Protection of Homeowners in Foreclosure Act (PHIFA) and the 2008 efforts to modernize Maryland's draconian foreclosure procedures. PHIFA was one of the very early attempts by a state to end what is commonly known as a foreclosure rescue scheme (or fraud). PHIFA has been the model for other states fighting these frauds. In 2008, Delegate Niemann was once again a leader in the House in the successful fight to strengthen the standards for mortgage brokers, to make substantial changes to the Maryland procedures for foreclosures that protected consumers, and to improve PHIFA. Notably, these financial measures were taken months before most Americans were aware of the financial crisis that hit the nation in the fall of 2008.

=== Legislative notes ===
- voted for the Clean Indoor Air Act of 2007 (HB359)
- voted against slots in 2005 (HB1361)
- voted for the Tax Reform Act of 2007 (HB2)
- voted in favor of prohibiting ground rents in 2007(SB106)
- voted in favor of in-state tuition for illegal immigrants in 2007 (HB6)

== Personal life and death ==
Niemann died at the MedStar Washington Hospital Center in Washington, D.C., on May 1, 2024, at the age of 77. Governor Wes Moore ordered flags to fly at half-staff in honor of Niemann on May 31.

== Past elections ==
- 2006 Race for Maryland House of Delegates – 47th District

Voters to choose three:

Name	Votes	Percent	Outcome
Jolene Ivey, Democratic	12,860	35.5%	Won
Victor R. Ramirez, Democratic	12,231	33.6%	Won
Doyle L. Niemann, Democratic	11,229	30.8%	Won
Other write-ins	120	.3%	

- 2010 Race for Maryland House of Delegates – 47th District

Voters to choose three:

Name	Votes	Percent	Outcome
Jolene Ivey, Democratic	14,404	35.4%	Won
Michael G. Summers, Democratic	12,337	30.3%	Won
Doyle L. Niemann, Democratic	11,925	29.3%	Won
Rachel Audi, Republican	1,853	4.6%	
Anthony Cicoria, Democratic (Write in)	63	0.2%	
Other write-ins	87	0.2%	
