= David Valderrama =

American politician

Member of the Maryland House of Delegates from the 26th district
- In office January 9, 1991 – January 8, 2003 Serving with Rosa Lee Blumenthal, Christine M. Jones, C. Anthony Muse, Obie Patterson, and Kerry Hill
- Preceded by: Gloria G. Lawlah
- Succeeded by: Veronica L. Turner
- Constituency: Prince George's County, Maryland

Personal details
- Born: David Mercado Valderrama; February 1, 1933 (age 93) Manila, Philippines
- Party: Democratic
- Children: Kris Valderrama

David Mercado Valderrama (born February 1, 1933) is a Filipino-American politician from Maryland. He served as a Democratic member of the Maryland House of Delegates from 1991 to 2003 and was the first Filipino-American elected to a state legislature on the mainland United States, as well as the first Asian American and first Filipino American elected to the Maryland General Assembly.

== Early life and education ==
Valderrama was born in Manila on February 1, 1933. At 16 years old, he went into business for himself, selling everything from cars to cigarettes. He aspired to be a violinist, organizing an orchestra while in high school. He also helped edit the school paper and won national essay contests. He attended Far Eastern University, where he earned a Bachelor of Laws degree in 1956, and George Washington University, where he earned a Master of Comparative Law degree in 1988.

== Career ==
Valderrama became involved with politics while attending college. He spoke out against the regime of Philippine President Ferdinand Marcos after his declaration of martial law in the Philippines in 1972, later criticizing him during his meeting with U.S. President Ronald Reagan in 1982. In December 1984, Valderrama was arrested during an anti-apartheid demonstration outside of the South African embassy in Washington, D.C., and in the following year he formed the Asian Americans Against Apartheid group to encourage community protests against the regime in South Africa and for the release of Nelson Mandela.

In 1982, Valderrama ran for the Maryland House of Delegates in District 25. Although his bid was unsuccessful, political observers were surprised with the force in which Philippine American voters turned out to support Valderrama. In 1986, Maryland governor Harry Hughes appointed Valderrama to serve on the Orphans' Court.

In September 2016, Valderrama attended an anti-Marcos protest in Washington, D.C. to protest against Philippine President Rodrigo Duterte's decision to allow Marcos' burial at the Libingan ng mga Bayani cemetery.

== In the legislature ==
Valderrama was sworn into the Maryland House of Delegates on January 9, 1991. From 1995 to 2001, he served the Deputy Majority Whip, and as the Deputy Majority Leader of the House of Delegates from 2001 to 2003. During his service, he unsuccessfully pushed for the legalization of medical marijuana.

=== Committee assignments ===
- Member, Constitutional and Administrative Law Committee, 1991–92
- Member, Environmental Matters Committee, 1992–94
- Member, Judiciary Committee, 1995–2003 (gambling subcommittee, 1995–97; chair, gaming law & enforcement subcommittee, 1999–2003)
- Member, Joint Committee on Protocol, 1995–2003

=== Other memberships ===
- Member, Law Enforcement and State-Appointed Boards Committee, Prince George's County Delegation (chair, 1995–98)

== Electoral history ==
Maryland House of Delegates District 26 Democratic Primary Election, 1990
Party	Candidate	Votes	%
Democratic	Rosa Lee Blumenthal	5,093	16
Democratic	Christine M. Jones	4,868	16
Democratic	David M. Valderrama	4,095	13
Democratic	Otis Ducker	3,889	13
Democratic	Mary C. Larkin	3,839	12
Democratic	Bernard Phifer	3,125	10
Democratic	Alfred L. Barrett	2,109	7
Democratic	Charles C. Diggs Jr.	1,911	6
Democratic	Veronica Turner	1,645	5
Democratic	Leighton D. Williams	441	1

Maryland House of Delegates District 26 Election, 1990
Party	Candidate	Votes	%
Democratic	Rosa Lee Blumenthal	11,941	20
Democratic	Christine M. Jones	11,888	20
Democratic	David M. Valderrama	10,889	28
Republican	Claude W. Roxborough	4,497	11

Maryland House of Delegates District 26 Democratic Primary Election, 1994
Party	Candidate	Votes	%
Democratic	C. Anthony Muse	8,716	24
Democratic	David M. Valderrama	6,657	18
Democratic	Obie Patterson	6,234	17
Democratic	Rosa Lee Blumenthal	4,187	12
Democratic	Christine M. Jones	3,953	11
Democratic	Napoleon Lechoco	1,997	6
Democratic	Charles H. French	1,784	5
Democratic	Gloria E. Horton	1,215	3
Democratic	Henry W. Harris Sr.	762	2
Democratic	Leighton D. Williams	545	2

Maryland House of Delegates District 26 Election, 1994
Party	Candidate	Votes	%
Democratic	C. Anthony Muse	17,807	27
Democratic	David M. Valderrama	17,206	26
Democratic	Obie Patterson	16,483	25
Republican	Max L. Buff	4,814	7
Republican	Claude W. Roxborough	4,612	7
Republican	Erich H. Schmidt	4,215	6

Maryland House of Delegates District 26 Election, 1998
Party	Candidate	Votes	%
Democratic	David M. Valderrama	5,715	18
Democratic	Obie Patterson	5,669	18
Democratic	Kerry Hill	4,965	15
Democratic	Xavier Aragona	4,965	15
Democratic	Otis Ducker	3,462	11
Democratic	Charles H. French	2,676	8
Democratic	Paul Frank Baiers Jr.	1,925	6
Democratic	Napoleon Lechoco	1,565	5
Democratic	Patrick A. Schaeffer Jr.	1,087	3
Democratic	Leighton D. Williams	641	2

Maryland House of Delegates District 26 Election, 1998
Party	Candidate	Votes	%
Democratic	Obie Patterson	23,465	34
Democratic	David M. Valderrama	23,269	33
Democratic	Kerry Hill	23,174	33

Maryland Senate District 26 Democratic Primary Election, 2002
Party	Candidate	Votes	%
Democratic	Gloria G. Lawlah	12,343	69.3
Democratic	David M. Valderrama	3,240	18.2
Democratic	Zalee G. Harris	2,222	12.5
