= Tony Knotts =

American politician

Member of the Maryland House of Delegates from District 26
- In office January 14, 2015 – January 9, 2019
- Preceded by: Veronica L. Turner (D)
- Succeeded by: Veronica L. Turner (D)

Member of the Prince George's County Council
- In office May 21, 2002 – December 6, 2010
- Preceded by: Isaac Gourdine (D)
- Succeeded by: Obie Patterson (D)

Personal details
- Born: May 12, 1951 (age 75) Danville, Virginia
- Party: Democratic
- Spouse: Married

Tony Knotts (born May 12, 1951) is an American Democratic politician who represented District 26 (Prince George's County) in the Maryland House of Delegates from 2015 to 2019. He also represented District 8 in the Prince George's County council from 2002 to 2010, a seat he will be running for again in 2022 following the resignation of Monique Anderson-Walker.

== Electoral history ==
Maryland House of Delegates District 26 Democratic General Election, 2014
Party	Candidate	Votes	%
Democratic	Tony Knotts	27,487	35
Democratic	Jay Walker	25,434	33
Democratic	Kris Valderrama	24,821	32
Other/Write-In	Other/Write-In	287	0

Maryland House of Delegates District 26 Democratic Primary Election, 2014
Party	Candidate	Votes	%
Democratic	Jay Walker	9,428	24
Democratic	Kris Valderrama	8,217	21
Democratic	Tony Knotts	8,129	21
Democratic	Tamara Davis Brown	5,698	15
Democratic	David Sloan	2,782	7
Democratic	Xavier A. Aragona	1,692	4
Democratic	Xavier A. Aragona	1,359	4
Democratic	Vernon O. Holmes Jr.	877	2
Democratic	Leonard C. "Len" Hopkins Sr.	585	2
