= 2006 Maryland Senate election =

- November 7, 2006

All 47 seats in the Maryland Senate 24 seats needed for a majority
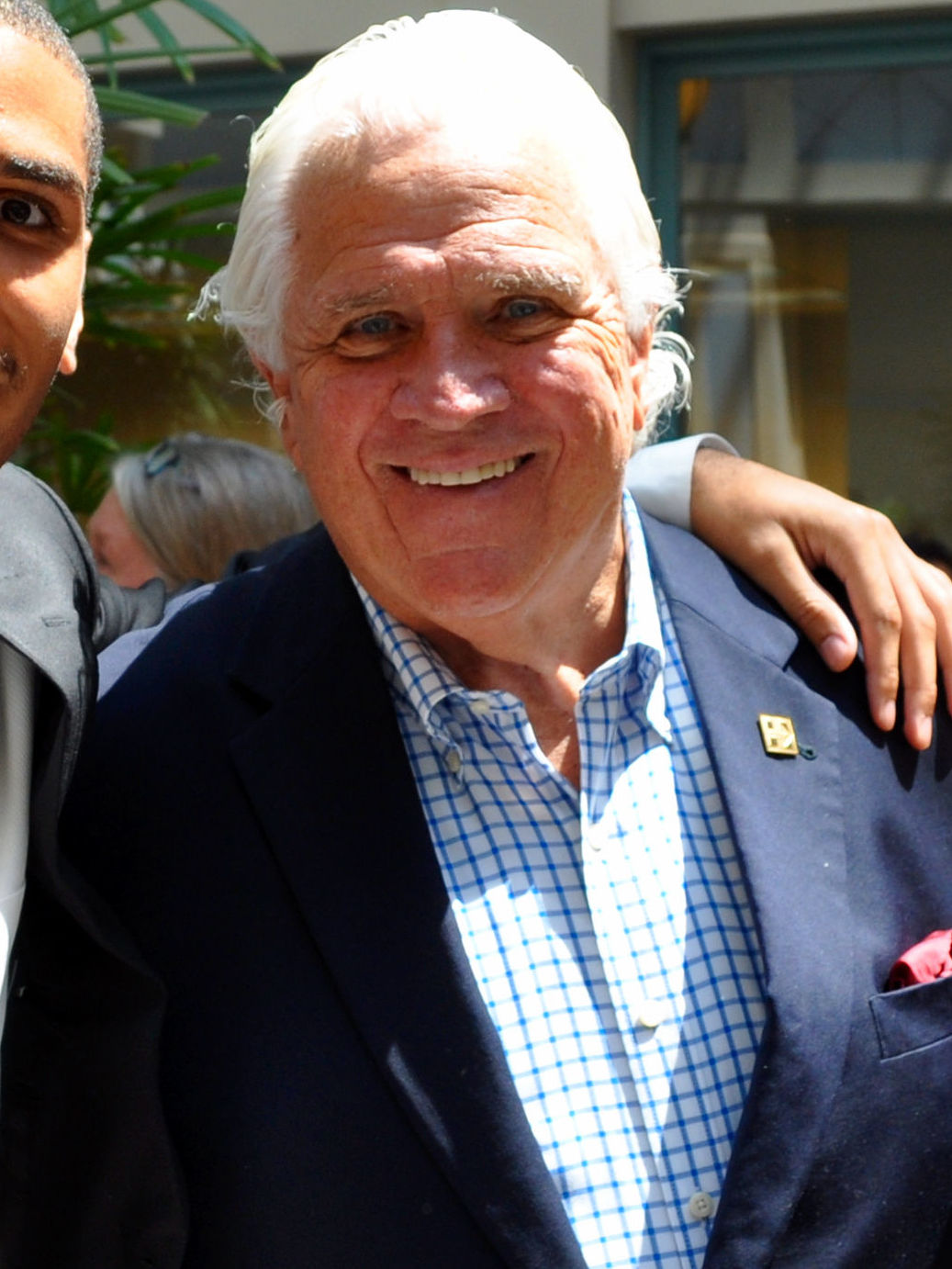

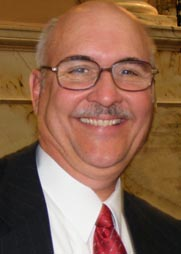
	Majority party	Minority party
Leader	Mike Miller	J. Lowell Stoltzfus
Party	Democratic	Republican
Leader since	January 21, 1987	September 27, 2001
Leader's seat	27th district	38th district
Last election	33	14
Seats won	33	14
Seat change	Steady	Steady
- Results: Democratic gain Republican gain Democratic hold Republican hold
President before election
Thomas V. Miller Jr.
Democratic
Elected President
Thomas V. Miller Jr.
Democratic

The 2006 Maryland Senate elections were held on November 7, 2006, as part of the 2006 United States elections, including the 2006 Maryland gubernatorial election. All 47 of Maryland's state senators were up for reelection. Neither party netted seats, allowing Democrats to retain supermajority control of the chamber.

== Summary ==
=== Closest races ===
Seats where the margin of victory was under 10%:

1. State Senate district 31, 1.72% (gain)
2. State Senate district 3, 4.12%
3. State Senate district 30, 5.89%

== Retiring incumbents ==
=== Democrats ===
1. District 11: Paula Hollinger retired to run for Congress in Maryland's 3rd congressional district.
2. District 18: Sharon M. Grosfeld retired.
3. District 19: Leonard Teitelbaum retired.
4. District 23: Leo E. Green retired.
5. District 26: Gloria G. Lawlah retired.
6. District 31: Philip C. Jimeno retired.
7. District 40: Ralph M. Hughes retired.

=== Republicans ===
1. District 1: John J. Hafer retired.

== Incumbents defeated ==
=== In primary elections ===
==== Democrats ====
1. District 20: Ida G. Ruben lost renomination to Jamie Raskin.
2. District 21: John A. Giannetti Jr. lost renomination to James Rosapepe.

=== In the general election ===
==== Republicans ====
1. District 13: Sandra Schrader lost to James N. Robey.
2. District 21: John A. Giannetti Jr. lost to James Rosapepe. (Note: Giannetti was elected to the Maryland Senate as a Democrat, but lost in the primary election to James Rosapepe. He unsuccessfully ran in the general election as a Republican.)

== Predictions ==
Source	Ranking	As of
Rothenberg	Safe D	November 4, 2006

== Detailed results ==
=== District 1 ===
==== Republican primary ====
Maryland Senate District 1 Republican primary election, 2006
Party	Candidate	Votes	%
Republican	George C. Edwards	9,559	80.3
Republican	John "Ross" Sines	2,339	19.7

==== General election ====
Maryland Senate District 1 election, 2006
Party	Candidate	Votes	%
Republican	George C. Edwards	25,365	72.7
Democratic	Thomas Conlon	9,489	27.2
Write-in		19	0.1
Republican hold			

=== District 2 ===
Maryland Senate District 2 election, 2006
Party	Candidate	Votes	%
Republican	Donald F. Munson (incumbent)	28,900	98.9
Write-in		320	1.1
Republican hold			

=== District 3 ===
==== Republican primary ====
Maryland Senate District 3 Republican primary election, 2006
Party	Candidate	Votes	%
Republican	Alex Mooney (incumbent)	5,617	64.4
Republican	Hugh M. Warner	1,773	20.3
Republican	Tim Brooks	1,337	15.3

==== General election ====
Maryland Senate District 3 election, 2006
Party	Candidate	Votes	%
Republican	Alex Mooney (incumbent)	21,844	51.9
Democratic	Candy O. Greenway	20,111	47.8
Write-in		104	0.2
Republican hold			

=== District 4 ===
==== Republican primary ====
Maryland Senate District 4 Republican primary election, 2006
Party	Candidate	Votes	%
Republican	David R. Brinkley (incumbent)	8,420	84.1
Republican	Paul Chamberlain	1,587	15.9

==== General election ====
Maryland Senate District 4 election, 2006
Party	Candidate	Votes	%
Republican	David R. Brinkley (incumbent)	33,879	98.7
Write-in		455	1.3
Republican hold			

=== District 5 ===
==== Republican primary ====
Maryland Senate District 5 Republican primary election, 2006
Party	Candidate	Votes	%
Republican	Larry E. Haines (incumbent)	7,172	69.3
Republican	Michelle Jefferson	3,181	30.7

==== General election ====
Maryland Senate District 5 election, 2006
Party	Candidate	Votes	%
Republican	Larry E. Haines (incumbent)	38,984	97.9
Write-in		821	2.1
Republican hold			

=== District 6 ===
Maryland Senate District 6 election, 2006
Party	Candidate	Votes	%
Democratic	Norman R. Stone Jr. (incumbent)	21,012	69.9
Republican	Bill "Kush" Kushnerick	9,028	30.0
Write-in		20	0.1
Democratic hold			

=== District 7 ===
Maryland Senate District 7 election, 2006
Party	Candidate	Votes	%
Republican	Andy Harris (incumbent)	23,453	56.6
Democratic	Patricia A. Foerster	17,972	43.3
Write-in		35	0.1
Republican hold			

=== District 8 ===
==== Republican primary ====
Maryland Senate District 8 Republican primary election, 2006
Party	Candidate	Votes	%
Republican	Craig Borne	3,083	68.1
Republican	Cal Clemons	1,444	31.9

==== General election ====
Maryland Senate District 8 election, 2006
Party	Candidate	Votes	%
Democratic	Kathy Klausmeier (incumbent)	24,299	58.2
Republican	Craig Borne	17,401	41.7
Write-in		37	0.1
Democratic hold			

=== District 9 ===
Maryland Senate District 9 election, 2006
Party	Candidate	Votes	%
Republican	Allan H. Kittleman (incumbent)	33,317	62.2
Democratic	Rich Corkran	14,738	37.8
Write-in		33	0.1
Republican hold			

=== District 10 ===
==== Democratic primary ====
Maryland Senate District 10 Democratic primary election, 2006
Party	Candidate	Votes	%
Democratic	Delores G. Kelley (incumbent)	11,027	63.2
Democratic	Pat Kelly	5,507	31.6
Democratic	Charles E. Arthur	901	5.2

==== General election ====
Maryland Senate District 10 election, 2006
Party	Candidate	Votes	%
Democratic	Delores G. Kelley (incumbent)	33,526	99.3
Write-in		245	0.7
Democratic hold			

=== District 11 ===
==== Democratic primary ====
Maryland Senate District 11 Democratic primary election, 2006
Party	Candidate	Votes	%
Democratic	Robert Zirkin	14,362	71.3
Democratic	Scott Rifkin	5,779	28.7

==== General election ====
Maryland Senate District 11 election, 2006
Party	Candidate	Votes	%
Democratic	Robert Zirkin	34,782	70.8
Republican	Jeffrey S. Yablon	14,312	29.1
Write-in		46	0.1
Democratic hold			

=== District 12 ===
Maryland Senate District 12 election, 2006
Party	Candidate	Votes	%
Democratic	Edward J. Kasemeyer (incumbent)	26,286	62.3
Republican	Richard I. Martel Jr.	15,884	37.6
Write-in		29	0.1
Democratic hold			

=== District 13 ===
Maryland Senate District 13 election, 2006
Party	Candidate	Votes	%
Democratic	James N. Robey	24,354	56.1
Republican	Sandra B. Schrader (incumbent)	19,021	43.8
Write-in		32	0.1
Democratic gain from Republican			

=== District 14 ===
Maryland Senate District 14 election, 2006
Party	Candidate	Votes	%
Democratic	Rona E. Kramer (incumbent)	22,938	67.8
Republican	Frank Hackenberg	12,733	32.1
Write-in		53	0.1
Democratic hold			

=== District 15 ===
Maryland Senate District 15 election, 2006
Party	Candidate	Votes	%
Democratic	Robert J. Garagiola (incumbent)	27,788	65.8
Republican	Bill Askinazi	14,448	34.2
Write-in		25	0.1
Democratic hold			

=== District 16 ===
Maryland Senate District 16 election, 2006
Party	Candidate	Votes	%
Democratic	Brian E. Frosh (incumbent)	35,290	75.7
Republican	Robert F. Dyer Jr.	11,317	24.3
Write-in		28	0.1
Democratic hold			

=== District 17 ===
Maryland Senate District 17 election, 2006
Party	Candidate	Votes	%
Democratic	Jennie M. Forehand (incumbent)	27,588	98.6
Write-in		392	1.4
Democratic hold			

=== District 18 ===
Maryland Senate District 18 election, 2006
Party	Candidate	Votes	%
Democratic	Richard Madaleno	28,050	76.0
Republican	David Stegmaier	8,834	23.9
Write-in		35	0.1
Democratic hold			

=== District 19 ===
==== Democratic primary ====
Maryland Senate District 19 Democratic primary election, 2006
Party	Candidate	Votes	%
Democratic	Michael G. Lenett	7,274	52.4
Democratic	Adrienne A. Mandel	3,405	24.5
Democratic	Carol S. Petzold	3,215	23.1

==== Republican primary ====
Maryland Senate District 19 Republican primary election, 2006
Party	Candidate	Votes	%
Republican	Mike Ryman	2,521	78.3
Republican	Lynn Siguenza	698	21.7

==== General election ====
Maryland Senate District 19 election, 2006
Party	Candidate	Votes	%
Democratic	Michael G. Lenett	25,810	68.3
Republican	Mike Ryman	11,933	31.6
Write-in		45	0.1
Democratic hold			

=== District 20 ===
==== Democratic primary ====
Maryland Senate District 20 Democratic primary election, 2006
Party	Candidate	Votes	%
Democratic	Jamie Raskin	9,585	66.6
Democratic	Ida G. Ruben (incumbent)	4,812	33.4

==== General election ====
Maryland Senate District 20 election, 2006
Party	Candidate	Votes	%
Democratic	Jamie Raskin	26,251	98.7
Write-in		349	1.3
Democratic hold			

=== District 21 ===
==== Democratic primary ====
Maryland Senate District 21 Democratic primary election, 2006
Party	Candidate	Votes	%
Democratic	James Rosapepe	5,837	58.5
Democratic	John A. Giannetti Jr. (incumbent)	3,881	38.9
Democratic	Jessie Pulivarti	266	2.7

==== General election ====
Maryland Senate District 21 election, 2006
Party	Candidate	Votes	%
Democratic	James Rosapepe	18,067	67.5
Republican	John A. Giannetti Jr. (incumbent)	8,663	32.4
Write-in		30	0.1
Democratic hold			

=== District 22 ===
Maryland Senate District 22 election, 2006
Party	Candidate	Votes	%
Democratic	Paul G. Pinsky (incumbent)	20,397	99.2
Write-in		156	0.8
Democratic hold			

=== District 23 ===
==== Democratic primary ====
Maryland Senate District 23 Democratic primary election, 2006
Party	Candidate	Votes	%
Democratic	Douglas J. J. Peters	7,782	45.0
Democratic	Bobby G. Henry Jr.	7,212	41.7
Democratic	Greg Holmes	2,287	13.2

==== General election ====
Maryland Senate District 23 election, 2006
Party	Candidate	Votes	%
Democratic	Douglas J. J. Peters	33,791	99.0
Write-in		353	1.0
Democratic hold			

=== District 24 ===
Maryland Senate District 24 election, 2006
Party	Candidate	Votes	%
Democratic	Nathaniel Exum (incumbent)	22,649	99.7
Write-in		66	0.3
Democratic hold			

=== District 25 ===
Maryland Senate District 25 election, 2006
Party	Candidate	Votes	%
Democratic	Ulysses Currie (incumbent)	26,333	99.7
Write-in		66	0.3
Democratic hold			

=== District 26 ===
==== Democratic primary ====
Maryland Senate District 26 Democratic primary election, 2006
Party	Candidate	Votes	%
Democratic	C. Anthony Muse	9,846	55.1
Democratic	Obie Patterson	8,028	44.9

==== General election ====
Maryland Senate District 26 election, 2006
Party	Candidate	Votes	%
Democratic	C. Anthony Muse	26,361	98.8
Write-in		310	1.2
Democratic hold			

=== District 27 ===
Maryland Senate District 27 election, 2006
Party	Candidate	Votes	%
Democratic	Thomas V. Miller Jr. (incumbent)	29,562	70.4
Republican	Ron Miller	12,410	29.5
Write-in		31	0.1
Democratic hold			

=== District 28 ===
Maryland Senate District 28 election, 2006
Party	Candidate	Votes	%
Democratic	Thomas M. Middleton (incumbent)	25,646	65.3
Republican	Jay Bala	13,631	34.7
Write-in		16	0.0
Democratic hold			

=== District 29 ===
Maryland Senate District 29 election, 2006
Party	Candidate	Votes	%
Democratic	Roy Dyson (incumbent)	25,258	63.9
Republican	Thomas F. McKay	14,188	35.9
Write-in		62	0.2
Democratic hold			

=== District 30 ===
Maryland Senate District 30 election, 2006
Party	Candidate	Votes	%
Democratic	John Astle (incumbent)	24,999	52.9
Republican	Herbert H. McMillan	22,216	47.0
Write-in		29	0.1
Democratic hold			

=== District 31 ===
==== Democratic primary ====
Maryland Senate District 31 Democratic primary election, 2006
Party	Candidate	Votes	%
Democratic	Walter J. Shandrowsky	6,265	60.0
Democratic	Matthew L. McBride	4,184	40.0

==== Republican primary ====
Maryland Senate District 31 Republican primary election, 2006
Party	Candidate	Votes	%
Republican	Bryan Simonaire	3,032	42.0
Republican	Carl G. "Dutch" Holland	1,620	22.4
Republican	Mike Jacobs	1,533	21.2
Republican	Thomas R. Gardner	821	11.4
Republican	Charles "Casey" Robison	218	3.0

==== General election ====
Maryland Senate District 31 election, 2006
Party	Candidate	Votes	%
Republican	Bryan Simonaire	19,516	50.8
Democratic	Walter J. Shandrowsky	18,857	49.1
Write-in		28	0.1
Republican gain from Democratic			

=== District 32 ===
Maryland Senate District 32 election, 2006
Party	Candidate	Votes	%
Democratic	James E. DeGrange Sr. (incumbent)	21,672	60.8
Republican	Jon Vandenheuvel	13,939	39.1
Write-in		30	0.1
Democratic hold			

=== District 33 ===
Maryland Senate District 33 election, 2006
Party	Candidate	Votes	%
Republican	Janet Greenip (incumbent)	30,269	56.1
Democratic	Scott Hymes	23,689	43.9
Write-in		29	0.1
Republican hold			

=== District 34 ===
Maryland Senate District 34 election, 2006
Party	Candidate	Votes	%
Republican	Nancy Jacobs (incumbent)	21,601	57.3
Democratic	William B. Kilby	16,108	42.7
Write-in		18	0.0
Republican hold			

=== District 35 ===
Maryland Senate District 35 election, 2006
Party	Candidate	Votes	%
Republican	J. Robert Hooper (incumbent)	35,760	68.0
Democratic	Stan Kollar	16,803	31.9
Write-in		31	0.1
Republican hold			

=== District 36 ===
Maryland Senate District 36 election, 2006
Party	Candidate	Votes	%
Republican	E. J. Pipkin (incumbent)	27,101	63.7
Democratic	Harry E. Sampson	15,402	36.2
Write-in		34	0.1
Republican hold			

=== District 37 ===
==== Democratic primary ====
Maryland Senate District 37 Democratic primary election, 2006
Party	Candidate	Votes	%
Democratic	Hilary Spence	7,234	76.5
Democratic	Ronald Warden Sr.	2,225	23.5

==== General election ====
Maryland Senate District 37 election, 2006
Party	Candidate	Votes	%
Republican	Richard F. Colburn (incumbent)	23,415	56.2
Democratic	Hilary Spence	16,183	38.8
Independent	Moonyene Jackson-Amis	2,043	4.9
Write-in		25	0.1
Republican hold			

=== District 38 ===
Maryland Senate District 38 election, 2006
Party	Candidate	Votes	%
Republican	J. Lowell Stoltzfus (incumbent)	33,957	99.0
Write-in		347	1.0
Republican hold			

=== District 39 ===
Maryland Senate District 39 election, 2006
Party	Candidate	Votes	%
Democratic	Patrick J. Hogan (incumbent)	23,274	98.5
Write-in		358	1.5
Democratic hold			

=== District 40 ===
==== Democratic primary ====
Maryland Senate District 40 Democratic primary election, 2006
Party	Candidate	Votes	%
Democratic	Catherine Pugh	5,045	39.9
Democratic	Salima Siler Marriott	3,560	28.2
Democratic	Lawrence Bell	2,527	20.0
Democratic	Belinda K. Conaway	794	6.3
Democratic	Tara Andrews	521	4.1
Democratic	Timothy Mercer	196	1.6

==== General election ====
Maryland Senate District 40 election, 2006
Party	Candidate	Votes	%
Democratic	Catherine Pugh	20,112	90.1
Republican	Stephen George	2,160	9.7
Write-in		52	0.2
Democratic hold			

=== District 41 ===
==== Democratic primary ====
Maryland Senate District 41 Democratic primary election, 2006
Party	Candidate	Votes	%
Democratic	Lisa Gladden (incumbent)	15,147	90.7
Democratic	Leonard Kerpelman	1,555	9.3

==== General election ====
Maryland Senate District 41 election, 2006
Party	Candidate	Votes	%
Democratic	Lisa Gladden (incumbent)	27,472	99.3
Write-in		193	0.7
Democratic hold			

=== District 42 ===
==== Republican primary ====
Maryland Senate District 42 Republican primary election, 2006
Party	Candidate	Votes	%
Republican	Douglas B. Riley	4,936	86.6
Republican	Glenn Torgerson	761	13.4

==== General election ====
Maryland Senate District 42 election, 2006
Party	Candidate	Votes	%
Democratic	James Brochin (incumbent)	24,588	56.3
Republican	Douglas B. Riley	19,084	43.7
Write-in		30	0.1
Democratic hold			

=== District 43 ===
==== Democratic primary ====
Maryland Senate District 43 Democratic primary election, 2006
Party	Candidate	Votes	%
Democratic	Joan Carter Conway (incumbent)	13,926	92.0
Democratic	Dave Vane	1,204	8.0

==== General election ====
Maryland Senate District 43 election, 2006
Party	Candidate	Votes	%
Democratic	Joan Carter Conway (incumbent)	24,686	88.7
Green	Maria Allwine	3,095	11.1
Write-in		60	0.2
Democratic hold			

=== District 44 ===
==== Democratic primary ====
Maryland Senate District 44 Democratic primary election, 2006
Party	Candidate	Votes	%
Democratic	Verna L. Jones (incumbent)	7,182	75.0
Democratic	Kevin A. Brooks	2,396	25.0

==== General election ====
Maryland Senate District 44 election, 2006
Party	Candidate	Votes	%
Democratic	Verna L. Jones (incumbent)	15,982	90.0
Republican	Sameerah S. Muhammad	1,757	9.9
Write-in		26	0.1
Democratic hold			

=== District 45 ===
==== Democratic primary ====
Maryland Senate District 45 Democratic primary election, 2006
Party	Candidate	Votes	%
Democratic	Nathaniel J. McFadden (incumbent)	10,589	91.6
Democratic	Greg Truitt	971	8.4

==== General election ====
Maryland Senate District 45 election, 2006
Party	Candidate	Votes	%
Democratic	Nathaniel J. McFadden (incumbent)	19,838	86.4
Republican	Leonard J. Wolff	3,112	13.5
Write-in		23	0.1
Democratic hold			

=== District 46 ===
Maryland Senate District 46 election, 2006
Party	Candidate	Votes	%
Democratic	George W. Della Jr. (incumbent)	16,623	73.0
Republican	Keith Losoya	6,112	26.8
Write-in		36	0.2
Democratic hold			

=== District 47 ===
==== Democratic primary ====
Maryland Senate District 47 Democratic primary election, 2006
Party	Candidate	Votes	%
Democratic	Gwendolyn T. Britt (incumbent)	6,707	83.7
Democratic	George Seymore	1,302	16.3

==== General election ====
Maryland Senate District 47 election, 2006
Party	Candidate	Votes	%
Democratic	Gwendolyn T. Britt (incumbent)	14,630	99.5
Write-in		79	0.5
Democratic hold			
