= Jamila Woods (politician) =

American politician (born 1963)

The Reverend Jamila Woods
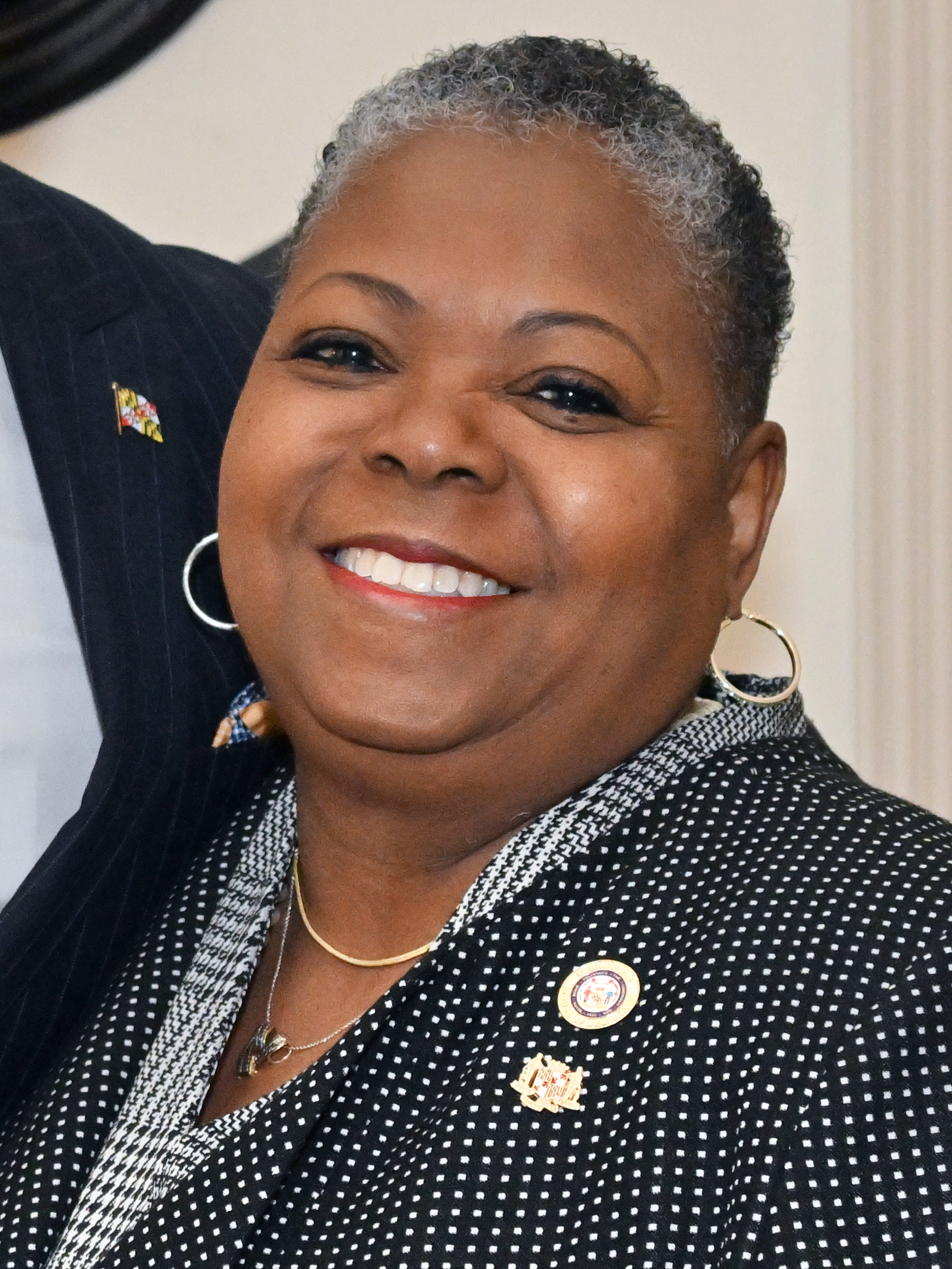
- Woods in 2023

Member of the Maryland House of Delegates from the 26th district
- Incumbent
- Assumed office January 11, 2023 Serving with Veronica L. Turner and Kris Valderrama
- Preceded by: Jay Walker

Personal details
- Born: Justina Dorothea Stewart; July 9, 1963 (age 63) Camden, New Jersey, U.S.
- Party: Democratic
- Children: 2
- Education: Howard University (BA, MDiv); University of Maryland, Baltimore (MS)
- Occupation: Pastor
- Website: Campaign website

Jamila Jaye Woods (born Justina Dorothea Stewart; July 9, 1963) is an American pastor and politician who is a member of the Maryland House of Delegates for District 26 in Prince George's County, Maryland.

== Background ==
Woods was born in Chesilhurst, New Jersey. She is a fifth-generation descendant of Linah Ross, who was brought to the United States from Ghana and sold into slavery. Ross was the older sister of Harriet Tubman.

Woods graduated from Howard University, earning a Bachelor of Arts degree in political science in 1990 and a Master of Divinity degree in 1999. She later attended the University of Maryland, Baltimore, where she earned a Master of Science degree in social work in 2002. Since 2012, Woods has been the pastor of the Jabez Christian Community Church in White Plains, Maryland. She was the pastor of the Cornerstone African Methodist Episcopal Church in La Plata, Maryland from 2005 to 2012.

In 2018, Woods unsuccessfully ran for the Maryland Senate in District 26, losing to former state delegate Obie Patterson in the Democratic primary with 41.9 percent of the vote. In April 2021, she graduated from the Maryland People's Leadership Institute, a campaign training program organized by Progressive Maryland. In 2022, Woods ran for the Maryland House of Delegates in District 26, running on a slate with former state senator C. Anthony Muse, state delegate Kris Valderrama, and Kendal Wade, a funeral home operator. She won the Democratic primary on July 19, coming in third place behind incumbent state delegates Veronica L. Turner and Valderrama with 17.2 percent of the vote.

== In the legislature ==
Woods was sworn into the Maryland House of Delegates on January 11, 2023. She is a member of the House Health and Government Operations Committee.

== Political positions ==
During the 2026 legislative session, Woods supported a bill to raise the minimum wage of Maryland from $15 to $25 an hour and eliminate all subminimum wages.

== Personal life ==
Woods has two children.

== Electoral history ==
Maryland Senate District 26 Democratic primary election, 2018
Party	Candidate	Votes	%
Democratic	Obie Patterson	11,516	58.1
Democratic	Jamila J. Woods	8,321	41.9

Maryland House of Delegates District 26 Democratic primary election, 2022
Party	Candidate	Votes	%
Democratic	Veronica L. Turner (incumbent)	11,004	20.0
Democratic	Kris Valderrama (incumbent)	10,107	18.4
Democratic	Jamila J. Woods	9,451	17.2
Democratic	Antwan C. Brown	7,524	13.7
Democratic	Angela R. Jones	5,633	10.3
Democratic	Andre D. Nottingham	3,904	7.1
Democratic	Kendal Wade	7,282	13.3

Maryland House of Delegates District 26 election, 2022
Party	Candidate	Votes	%
Democratic	Veronica L. Turner (incumbent)	30,612	33.77
Democratic	Jamila Woods	29,335	32.36
Democratic	Kris Valderrama (incumbent)	27,068	29.86
Republican	JoAnn Fisher	3,438	3.79
Write-in		193	0.21
