= Veronica L. Turner =

American politician (born 1950)

Veronica Turner
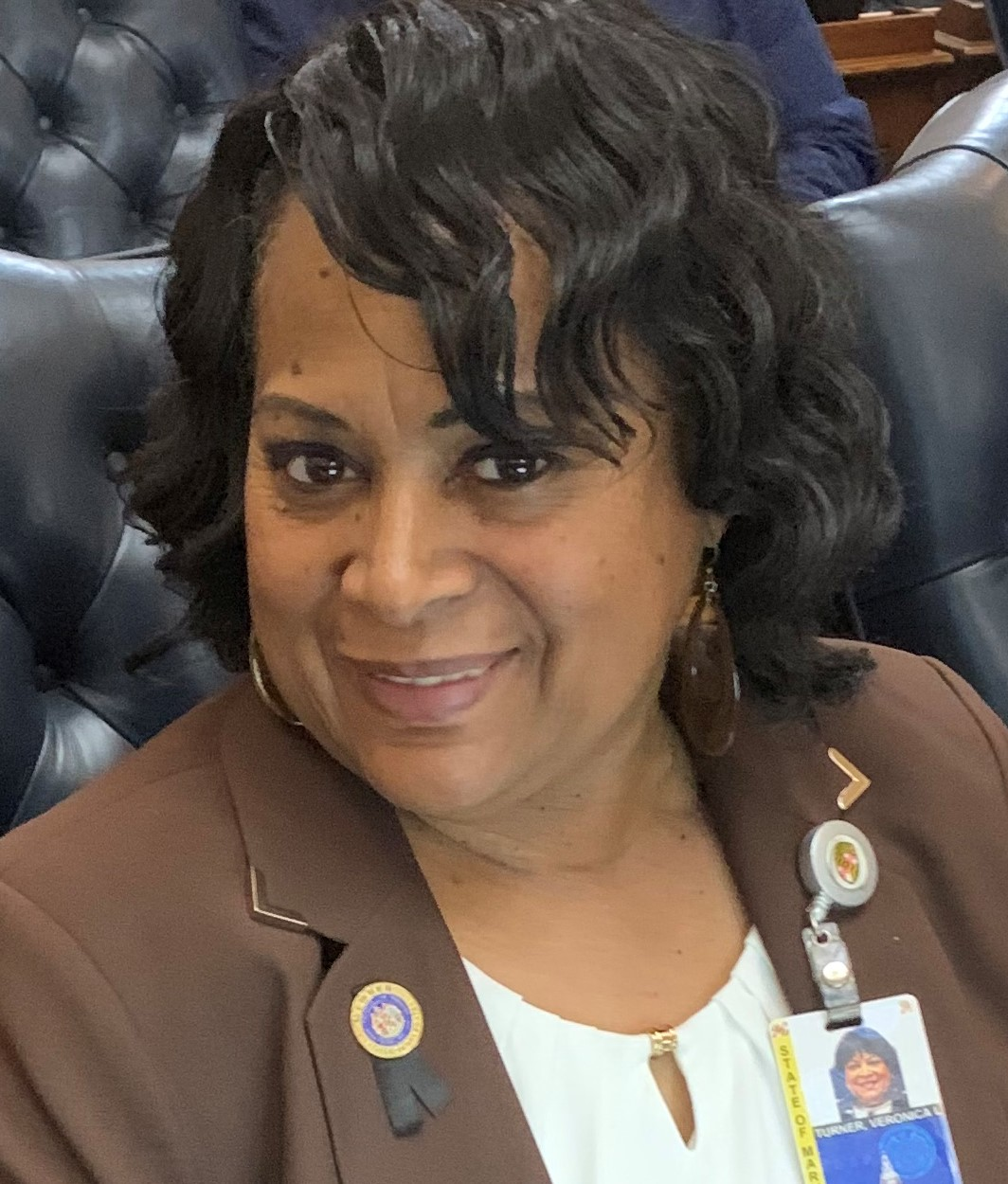

Member of the Maryland House of Delegates from the 26th district
- Incumbent
- Assumed office January 9, 2019 Serving with Kris Valderrama and Jay Walker
- Preceded by: Tony Knotts
- In office January 8, 2003 – January 14, 2015
- Preceded by: David M. Valderrama
- Succeeded by: Tony Knotts

Personal details
- Born: February 7, 1950 (age 76) Washington, D.C., U.S.
- Party: Democratic
- Spouse: Carson Turner

Veronica L. Turner (born February 7, 1950) is an American politician who represents District 26 in the Maryland House of Delegates.

== Background ==
Turner was born in Washington, D.C., on February 7, 1950. She attended Prince George's Community College, Tennessee State University, and the George Meany Center for Labor Studies. From 1996 to 2018, Turner served as the president of Service Employees International Union (SEIU) Local 63.

After the death of Prince George's County councilmember James C. Fletcher Jr. in 1994, Turner unsuccessfully ran in the special election to serve the rest of his term. She unsuccessfully ran again for the County Council in 2002, losing to Tony Knotts in the Democratic primary by just over 200 votes.

== In the legislature ==
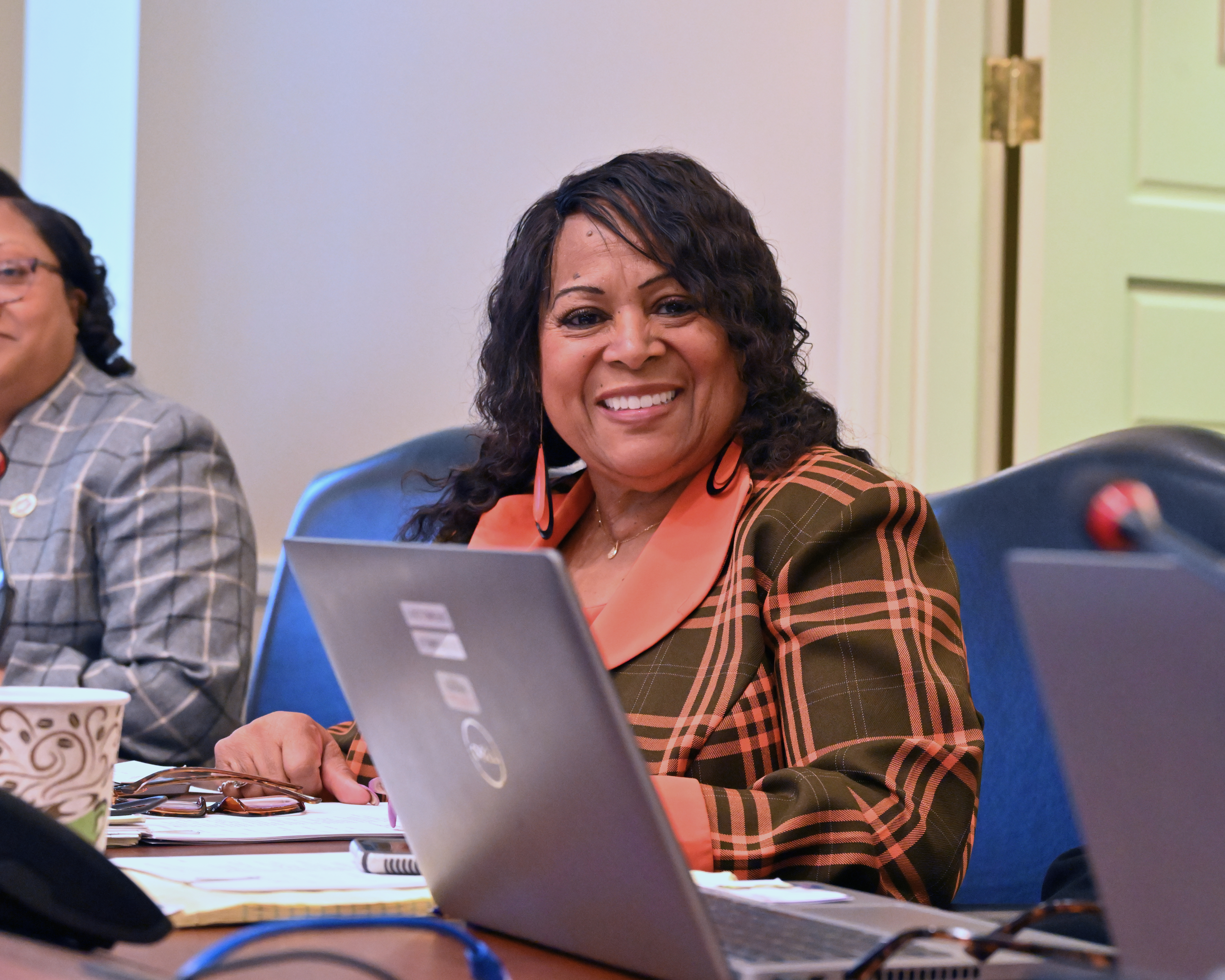
Turner in the House Economic Matters Committee, 2023

Turner was a member of the House of Delegates January 8, 2003, to January 14, 2015. Turner declined to run for re-election in 2014, instead running for Maryland Senate and challenging incumbent state Senator C. Anthony Muse. She lost to Muse in the Democratic primary election, coming 2,000 votes shy of defeating him.

Turner was re-elected to the House of Delegates in 2018 and was sworn in on January 9, 2019.

=== Committee assignments ===
- Member, Economic Matters Committee, since 2019 (business regulation subcommittee, 2020–present; property & casualty insurance subcommittee, since 2020)
- Member, Ways and Means Committee, 2019 (education subcommittee, 2019; election law subcommittee, 2019)
- Member, Health and Government Operations Committee, 2003–2015 (government operations subcommittee, 2003–04; health occupations subcommittee, 2003–2004; public health subcommittee, 2003–2005; health insurance subcommittee, 2004; insurance subcommittee, 2004; health facilities, equipment & products subcommittee, 2005; health facilities & occupations subcommittee, 2005–2010; public health & long-term care subcommittee, 2005–2015; minority health disparities subcommittee, 2011–2015)
- Member, Joint Committee on Health Care Delivery and Financing, 2005–2014
- Member, Joint Committee on Children, Youth, and Families, 2011–2015
- House Vice-chair, Protocol Committee, 2014–2015

=== Other memberships ===
- 2nd vice-chair, Prince George's County Delegation, 2012–2014 (law enforcement & state-appointed boards committee, 2003–07; bi-county committee, 2008–2010; vice-chair, Maryland-national capital park & planning commission committee, 2008–2010; vice-chair, county affairs committee, 2011–2012, member, 2013–2015)
- Member, Legislative Black Caucus of Maryland, 2003–2015, since 2019 (2nd vice-chair, 2004–2006; 1st vice-chair, 2006–2008; chair, 2008–2010)
- Member, Women Legislators of Maryland, 2003–2015, since 2019 (endorsement committee, 2006)

== Political positions ==
=== Health care ===
Turner introduced legislation in the 2005 legislative session that would limit the number of patients that nurses could care for. The bill was withdrawn on March 18, 2005.

=== Social issues ===
Turner supported the Civil Marriage Protection Act, a bill to legalize same-sex marriage in Maryland, but was unable to vote for it because she had an emergency surgery for a serious illness on the day of the vote. The bill passed the House of Delegates by a vote of 72–67 and was signed into law by Governor Martin O'Malley on March 2, 2012.

In January 2019, Turner voted for legislation to lift a ban on developer contributions in county political races. The bill passed out of committee by a vote of 18–5.

== Personal life ==
Turner is married and attends religious services at the Ebenezer African Methodist Episcopal Church in Fort Washington, Maryland.

== Electoral history ==
Maryland House of Delegates District 26 Democratic primary election, 2002
Party	Candidate	Votes	%
Democratic	Obie Patterson	10,248	23.9
Democratic	Veronica Turner	7,349	17.1
Democratic	Darryl A. Kelley	6,109	14.2
Democratic	Frederick Hutchinson	6,032	14.0
Democratic	Xavier A. Aragona	3,715	8.6
Democratic	Joyce A. Beck	3,301	7.7
Democratic	Henry W. Harris, Sr.	2,724	6.3
Democratic	Al Barrett	2,310	5.4
Democratic	Jackie Prentiss-Jones	1,163	2.7

Maryland House of Delegates District 26 election, 2002
Party	Candidate	Votes	%
Democratic	Veronica Turner	22,482	29.8
Democratic	Obie Patterson	21,794	28.9
Democratic	Darryl A. Kelley	21,306	28.2
Republican	JoAnn Fisher	3,675	4.9
Republican	Dale L. Anderson	3,562	4.7
Republican	Max Buff	2,623	3.5

Maryland House of Delegates District 26 election, 2006
Party	Candidate	Votes	%
Democratic	Veronica Turner	24,891	34.1
Democratic	Kris Valderrama	22,231	30.5
Democratic	Jay Walker	22,162	30.4
Republican	John Rowe	3,587	4.9
Write-in		108	0.1

Maryland House of Delegates District 26 election, 2010
Party	Candidate	Votes	%
Democratic	Veronica Turner	27,770	35.0
Democratic	Jay Walker	24,328	30.7
Democratic	Kris Valderrama	24,141	30.5
Republican	Holly Ellison Henderson	2,916	3.7
Write-in		107	0.1

Maryland Senate District 26 Democratic primary election, 2014
Party	Candidate	Votes	%
Democratic	C. Anthony Muse	7,676	50.7
Democratic	Veronica Turner	5,002	33.0
Democratic	Brian Patrick Woolfolk	1,351	8.9
Democratic	Jerry J. Mathis	1,116	7.4

Maryland House of Delegates District 26 Democratic primary election, 2018
Party	Candidate	Votes	%
Democratic	Jay Walker	11,749	24.3
Democratic	Veronica Turner	10,197	21.1
Democratic	Kris Valderrama	9,590	19.8
Democratic	David Sloan	4,403	9.2
Democratic	Sade Oshinubi	4,153	8.6
Democratic	Leonard "Lennie" Moses	3,475	7.2
Democratic	Diedra Henry-Spires	2,912	6.0
Democratic	Sean Chao	1,812	3.8

Maryland House of Delegates District 26 election, 2018
Party	Candidate	Votes	%
Democratic	Veronica Turner	35,748	35.1
Democratic	Kris Valderrama	32,523	32.0
Democratic	Jay Walker	11,749	24.3
Write-in		2,361	2.3

Maryland House of Delegates District 26 election, 2022
Party	Candidate	Votes	%
Democratic	Veronica L. Turner	30,612	33.77
Democratic	Jamila Woods	29,335	32.36
Democratic	Kris Valderrama	27,068	29.86
Republican	JoAnn Fisher	3,438	3.79
Write-in		193	0.21
