= Gloria G. Lawlah =

American politician (born 1939)

Gloria Lawlah
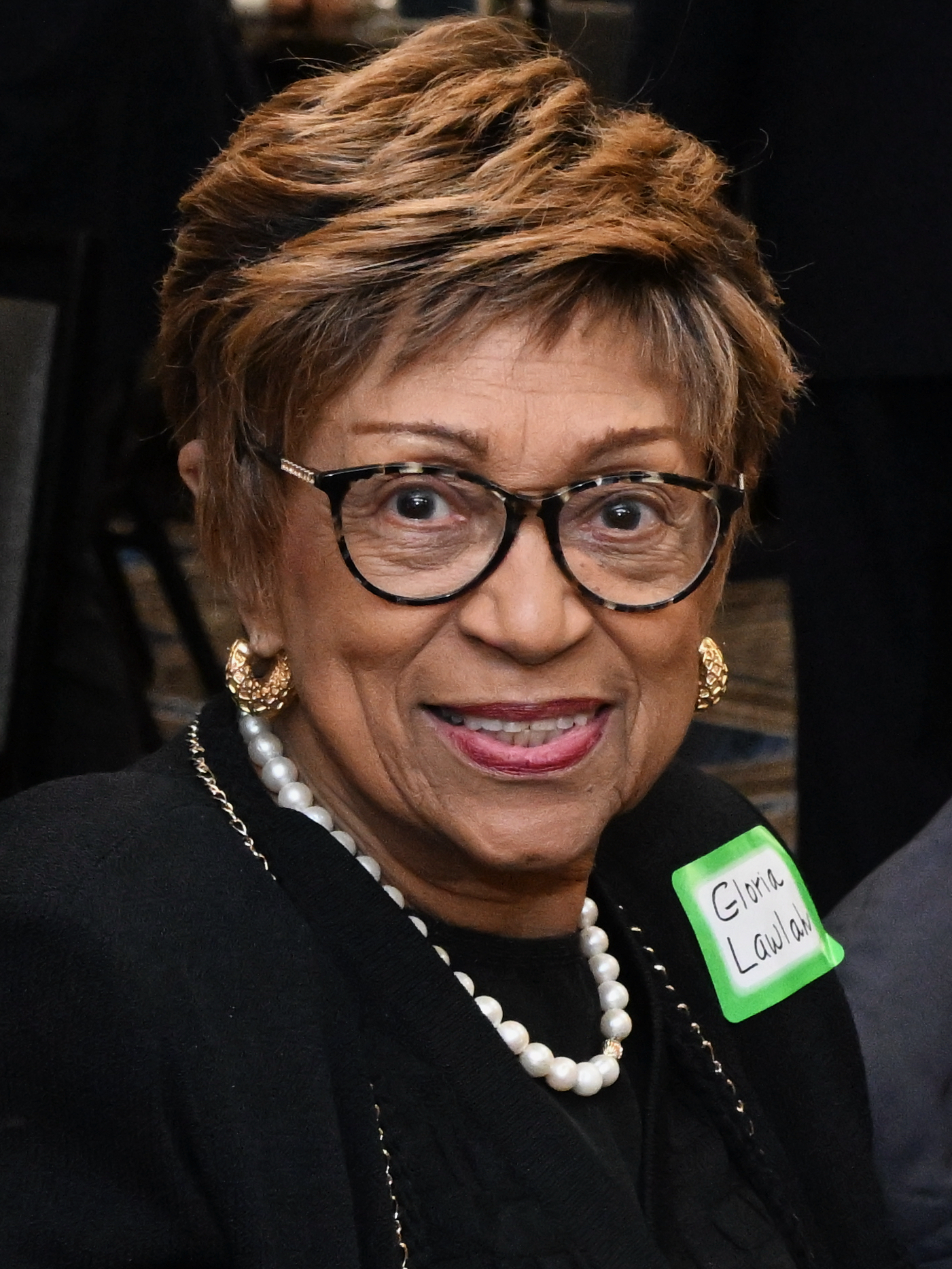
- Lawlah in 2023

Secretary of the Maryland Department of Aging
- In office March 20, 2007 – January 15, 2015
- Governor: Martin O'Malley
- Preceded by: Jean Roesser
- Succeeded by: Rona E. Kramer

Member of the Maryland Senate from the 26th district
- In office January 9, 1991 – January 10, 2007
- Preceded by: Frank Komenda
- Succeeded by: C. Anthony Muse
- Constituency: Prince George's County

Member of the Maryland House of Delegates from the 26th district
- In office January 14, 1987 – January 9, 1991 Serving with Rosa Lee Blumenthal and Christine M. Jones
- Preceded by: Frederick C. Rummage; Marian L. Patterson
- Succeeded by: David Mercado Valderrama
- Constituency: Prince George's County

Personal details
- Born: March 12, 1939 (age 87) Newberry, South Carolina
- Party: Democratic
- Spouse: Jack
- Children: Three children, six grandchildren
- Education: Hampton University (BA)

Gloria Gary Lawlah (born March 12, 1939) is an American politician who served as the Secretary of the Maryland Department of Aging under Governor Martin O'Malley from 2007 to 2015. She previously served in the Maryland Senate from 1991 to 2007 and in the Maryland House of Delegates from 1987 to 1991.

== Early life and education ==
Lawlah was born in Newberry, South Carolina on March 12, 1939. She grew up with Newberry alongside her sister, Gene. She attended Hampton University in Hampton, Virginia, where she earned a bachelor's degree in social studies. While at Hampton, she met her future husband, Jack, who eventually settled in LeDroit Park, a neighborhood in Washington, D.C. In 1972, she moved to Hillcrest Heights, Maryland.

== Career ==
Lawlah first got involved with politics after realizing that her home in Hillcrest Heights was represented by a Republican in the United States House of Representatives. Afterwards, she began working with elected officials and the local NAACP to integrate schools in Prince George's County, Maryland. She then got involved with the Prince George's County Women's Democratic Club, where she was able to meet U.S. Representative Gladys Spellman, Maryland governor Marvin Mandel, and then-state Senator Steny Hoyer.

=== Maryland House of Delegates ===
Lawlah was sworn into the Maryland House of Delegates on January 14, 1987.

==== Committee assignments ====
- Member, Constitutional and Administrative Law Committee, 1987–1991
- Member, Joint Committee on Federal Relations, 1987–1991

=== Maryland Senate ===
In 1990, Lawlah defeated incumbent state Senator Frank Komenda in the Democratic primary election, backed by abortion-rights advocates who sought to create a filibuster-proof majority in the Maryland Senate. Despite her, and other, victories in the general elections that year, the sought-after supermajority was never achieved. She was sworn in on January 9, 1991.

Lawlah considered running in the 1992 United States House of Representatives election in Maryland's 4th congressional district. In October 1991, she endorsed Prince George's County State's Attorney Alexander Williams Jr. for the seat.

Lawlah did not seek re-election in 2006, seeking to retire at the end of the year.

==== Committee assignments ====
- Senate Chair, Joint Committee on the Management of Public Funds, 2001–2007
- Member, Budget and Taxation Committee, 1995–2007 (capital budget subcommittee, 1999–2007; chair, health & human services subcommittee, 2003–2007, member, 2001–2007; chair, health, education & human resources subcommittee, 1997–1999; chair, public safety, transportation & environment subcommittee, 2000)
- Member, Economic and Environmental Affairs Committee, 1991–1994
- Member, Joint Committee on Investigation, 1991–2007
- Member, Joint Legislative Work Group on Community College Financing, 1994–1995
- Member, Special Joint Task Force on Transportation, 1995
- Member, Executive Nominations Committee, 1995–2000
- Member, Joint Committee on the Selection of the State Treasurer, 1996, 2003
- Member, Spending Affordability Committee, 1997–2000
- Member, Joint Audit Committee, 1998–2007
- Member, Joint Committee on Health Care Delivery and Financing, 1998–2007
- Member, Senate Committee on Redistricting, 2001–2002
- Member, Legislative Policy Committee, 2001–2003
- Member, Special Commission on Legislative Prayer, 2003
- Member, Joint Committee on the State's Emergency Medical Response System, 2003–2005
- Senate Co-chair, Joint Committee on Protocol, 2003–2007

==== Other memberships ====
- Chair, Prince George's County Delegation, 2004–2007 (vice-chair, 2001–2003)
- Member, Legislative Black Caucus of Maryland, 1999–2007 (chair, international affairs committee, 2001–2007; member, state budget committee, 2000, judicial nominating committee, 2000–2007, redistricting committee, 2000–2007, historically black colleges & universities committee, 2001–2007)
- Member, Women Legislators of Maryland, 1991–2007 (member at large, executive board, 2001–2002; 2nd vice-president, 2002–2003; president, 2003–2004)
- Member, National Conference of State Legislatures (economic development, trade & cultural affairs committee)

=== Maryland Secretary of Aging ===
On February 7, 2007, Governor Martin O'Malley appointed Lawlah to serve as the Secretary of the Maryland Department of Aging. Her nomination was unanimously approved by the Maryland Senate on February 23, 2007.

== Post-secretary career ==
Lawlah remained active in politics after 2015, organizing the 1,000 Maryland Women political action committee.

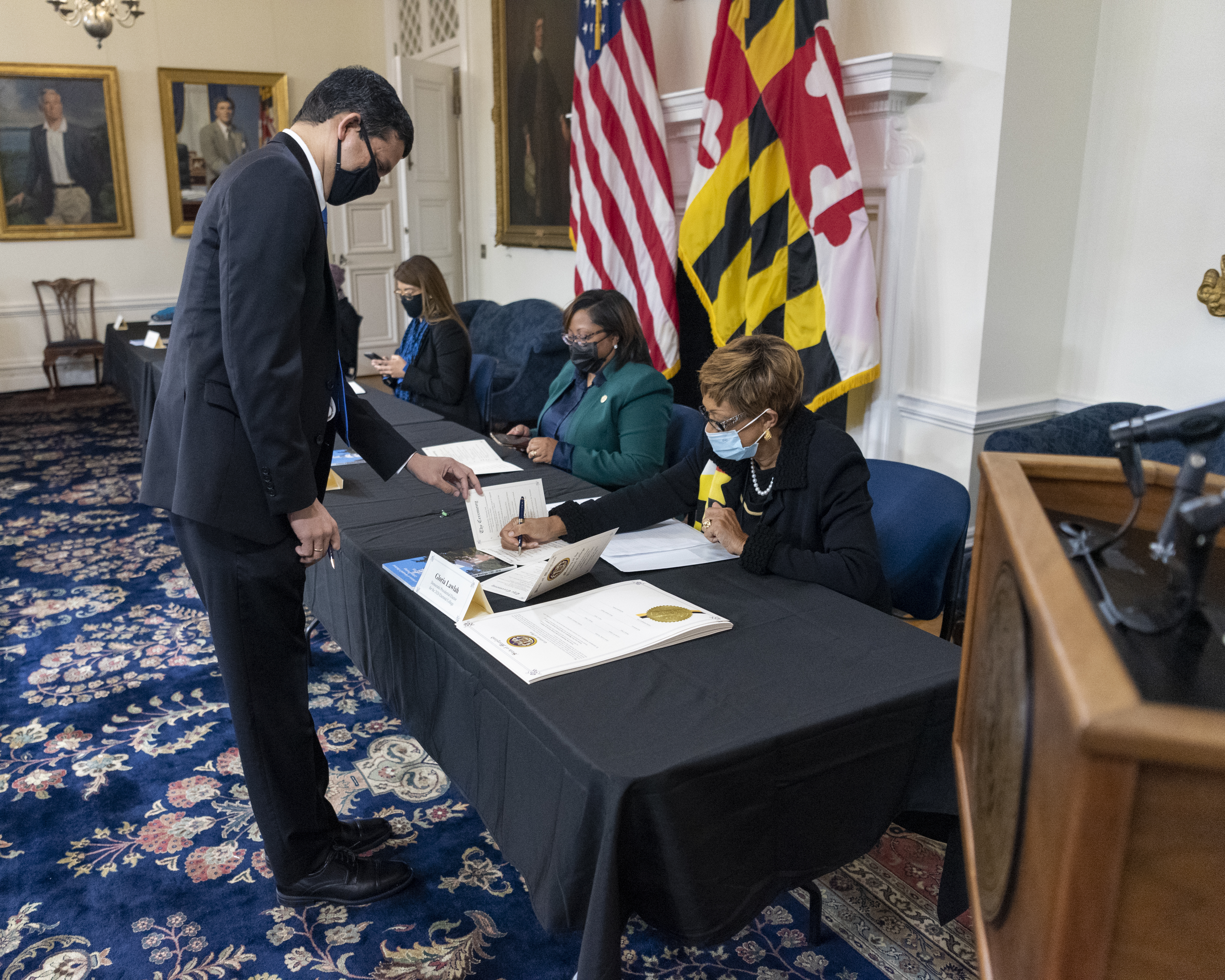
Lawlah as a member of the electoral college, 2020

Lawlah endorsed former Secretary of State Hillary Clinton for president on November 17, 2015. In April 2016, Lawlah endorsed U.S. Representative Chris Van Hollen in the 2016 United States Senate election in Maryland. In July 2019, she endorsed former Vice President Joe Biden for president. In the 2020 presidential election, Lawlah voted as an elector in Maryland's 4th congressional district. In March 2021, she endorsed Maryland comptroller Peter Franchot for Governor of Maryland.

In 2026, Prince George's County Executive Aisha Braveboy appointed Lawlah to the Maryland-National Capital Park and Planning Commission. Her appointment was confirmed by the Prince George's County Council in July 2026.

== Personal life ==
Lawlah is married to her husband, Jack, and has three children and six grandchildren. Together, they live in Hillcrest Heights, Maryland.

== Political positions ==
=== Abortion ===
Lawlah identifies as "pro-choice". In 1990, she challenged and defeated anti-abortion state Senator Frank Komenda in the Democratic primary elections after he voted for legislation that would have eliminated about 90 percent of abortions in Maryland. In 1991, Lawlah voted in favor of legislation that would provide access to abortion in Maryland while requiring physicians to inform minors' parents when their children seek an abortion. The bill passed and was signed into law by Governor William Donald Schaefer on February 18, 1991.

=== Gambling ===
Despite objections she made during hearings, Lawlah supported legislation backed by Governor Bob Ehrlich in 2004 to allow Prince George's County racetracks to have slot machines. In July 2011, Lawlah resigned from the Video Lottery Facility Location Commission after attending a single meeting, saying that she was "thrilled" to be named but had not anticipated the "tough" schedule.

=== Social issues ===
In October 1992, Lawlah criticized the Prince George's County Judicial Nominating Commission for rejecting attorney Elvira M. White, a Black woman, for judgeship based on charges of White being a "closet racist". In August 1994, she came to White's support after a Circuit Court judge ruled that she failed to adequately represent a woman charged with conspiring to murder her parents.

=== Term limits ===
In 2000, Lawlah refused to endorse a referendum to abolish term limits for the county executive and county council of Prince George's County. In November of that year, voters rejected a referendum by a 2-to-1 margin.

== Electoral history ==
Maryland House of Delegates District 26 Democratic Primary Election, 1986
Party	Candidate	Votes	%
Democratic	Gloria Lawlah	3,467	16
Democratic	Christine Miller Jones	3,456	16
Democratic	Rosa Lee Blumenthal	3,224	15
Democratic	Marian L. Patterson	2,970	14
Democratic	Otis Ducker	2,935	14
Democratic	Alfred L. Barrett	2,836	13
Democratic	Napoleon Lechoco	1,618	8
Democratic	Wayne M. Lanier	829	4

Maryland House of Delegates District 26 Election, 1986
Party	Candidate	Votes	%
Democratic	Rosa Lee Blumenthal	11,610	29
Democratic	Christine Miller Jones	10,893	27
Democratic	Gloria Lawlah	10,038	25
Republican	Lyle Delfosse	4,073	10
Republican	Lee F. Breuer	3,547	9

Maryland Senate District 26 Democratic Primary Election, 1990
Party	Candidate	Votes	%
Democratic	Gloria Lawlah	5,791	51.4
Democratic	Frank J. Komenda	5,468	48.6

Maryland Senate District 26 Election, 1990
Party	Candidate	Votes	%
Democratic	Gloria Lawlah	12,231	100.0

Maryland Senate District 26 Election, 1994
Party	Candidate	Votes	%
Democratic	Gloria Lawlah	17,590	76.8
Republican	Mary Bell G. Shepherd	5,321	23.2

Maryland Senate District 26 Democratic Primary Election, 1998
Party	Candidate	Votes	%
Democratic	Gloria Lawlah	6,567	51.0
Democratic	C. Anthony Muse	6,300	49.0

Maryland Senate District 26 Election, 1998
Party	Candidate	Votes	%
Democratic	Gloria Lawlah	25,303	100.0

Maryland Senate District 26 Democratic Primary Election, 2002
Party	Candidate	Votes	%
Democratic	Gloria Lawlah	12,343	69.3
Democratic	David Mercado Valderrama	3,240	18.2
Democratic	Zalee G. Harris	2,222	12.5

Maryland Senate District 26 Election, 2002
Party	Candidate	Votes	%
Democratic	Gloria Lawlah	25,842	99.4
Write-In		162	0.6
