= C. Anthony Muse =

American politician (born 1958)

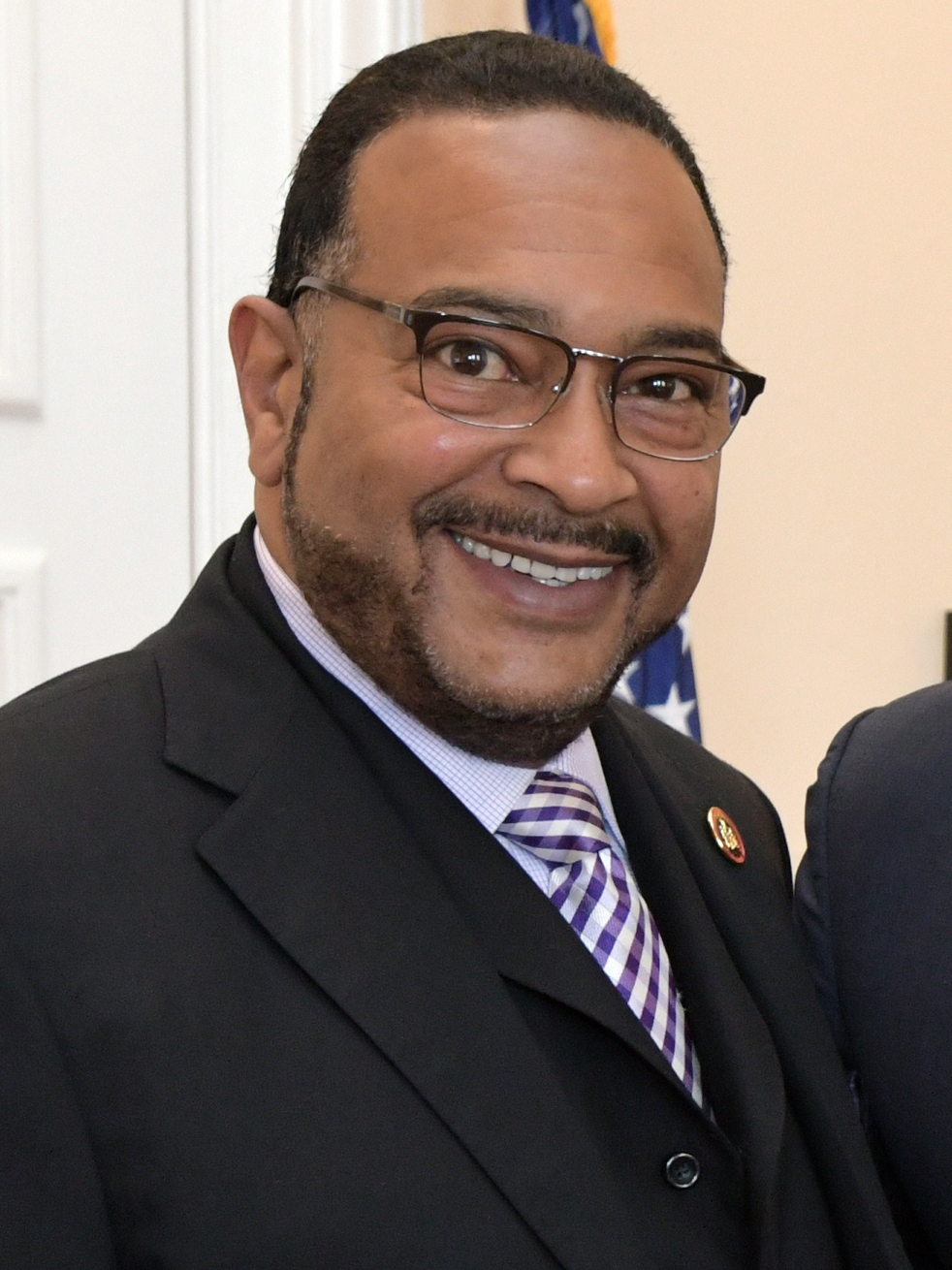
- Muse in 2023

Member of the Maryland Senate from the 26th district
- Incumbent
- Assumed office January 11, 2023
- Preceded by: Obie Patterson
- In office January 10, 2007 – January 9, 2019
- Preceded by: Gloria G. Lawlah
- Succeeded by: Obie Patterson

Member of the Maryland House of Delegates from the 26th district
- In office January 11, 1995 – January 13, 1999 Serving with Obie Patterson, David Valderrama
- Preceded by: Rosa Lee Blumenthal
- Succeeded by: Kerry Hill

Personal details
- Born: Charles Anthony Muse; April 17, 1958 (age 68) Baltimore, Maryland, U.S.
- Party: Democratic
- Spouse: Pat Lawson
- Children: 1
- Education: Morgan State University (BA); Wesley Theological Seminary (MDiv); Howard University (DMin)

Charles Anthony Muse (born April 17, 1958) is an American politician and minister who has served in the Maryland Senate representing the 26th district since 2023, and previously from 2007 to 2019. A member of the Democratic Party, he represented the district in the Maryland House of Delegates from 1995 to 1999.

Born and raised in Baltimore, Muse graduated from Morgan State University, Wesley Theological Seminary, and Howard University. He began his career as a Methodist pastor in Ellicott City and Prince George's County before becoming involved in Prince George's County politics. In 1990, he ran for the Maryland House of Delegates in the 27th district, losing to all three incumbents in the Democratic primary before moving and running for state delegate in the 26th district in 1994. Muse ran for state senator in 1998, narrowly losing to Democratic incumbent Gloria G. Lawlah in the Democratic primary. He ran for Prince George's County Executive in 2002, losing to state's attorney Jack B. Johnson in the Democratic primary election.

Muse was elected to the Maryland Senate in 2006 and was subsequently re-elected in 2010 and 2014. In 2012, he ran for the U.S. Senate, losing to Democratic incumbent Ben Cardin in the Democratic primary election. Muse ran again for Prince George's County Executive in 2018, placing third in the Democratic primary election. He was re-elected to the Maryland Senate in 2022.

== Early life and education ==
Muse was born in Baltimore on April 17, 1958. He was one of six children born to Gloria Watson, who had her first child when she was a teenager and married a man prone to violent outbursts, frequently beating him, his siblings, and his mother. They grew up in the Park Heights neighborhood of Baltimore. At age 12, his mother announced that they were moving to Alabama to escape their stepfather. Muse fled from his family and lived with his older brother, afterwards passing through 11 foster families before settling with United Methodist pastor George Stansbury.

Muse was expelled from three different school systems, including from Pimlico Junior High School, where he jumped up on a lunchroom table and started a fight with other students. As a teenager, he became mixed up with the wrong crowd and eventually needed to be rescued by Stansbury after running into a drug dealer whom he feared was going to harm him. Muse began preaching at his father's church by age 13.

Muse attended Morgan State University, where he earned a Bachelor of Arts degree in history in 1981; Wesley Theological Seminary, where he earned a Master of Divinity degree in 1984; and Howard University, where he earned a Doctor of Ministry degree in church and community development in 1991.

== Pastoral career ==
Muse began working in the ministry at age 20, first preaching at the Mount Zion United Methodist Church in Ellicott City, where he became known for his dramatic preaching and for adding guitars and drums to the service. He was reassigned to work as a pastor at the Gibbons-Resurrection United Methodist Church in Brandywine from 1984 to 1999, during which he expanded the church from 120 members to over 4,000 worshippers. Shortly after he left the church, Methodist leaders said that the church was $6 million in debt and had bond payments that were "seriously in arrears". Bishop Felton May offered the church $1.2 million in aid to help the church repay its debts, which Muse said was "not generous enough" and led him to resign from the Methodist denomination to become a nondenominational pastor. In interviews with The Washington Post, Muse offered a series of reasons for leaving the church, including "theological differences" in United Methodist's decision to appoint a transgender pastor, accusations that the church hierarchy did not support his congregation because they "are racist", and did not like his style of worship, which involved speaking in tongues and healing. After leaving the denomination, he started his own church, the Ark of Safety Christian Church, in Oxon Hill.

In May 2000, United Methodist Church officials filed a lawsuit against Muse to sort out assets and debts, which was settled with Muse paying the church $13,000 in exchange for the return of a television set and desk in 2002. After the church closed later that year, he acquired the property for $3.2 million and moved the church he founded, the Ark of Safety Christian Church, to the location. The Ark of declared bankruptcy in 2012 following the Great Recession. A court modified the church's mortgage terms, and the church continued to make regular payments until it defaulted in 2017, after which it began leasing the property. In January 2020, TMI Realty Advisors, who owned the site of Ark of Safety, motion to evict the congregation, alleging in court documents that Muse had not paid its $15,000 monthly rent since June.

== Political involvement ==
From 1987 to 1992, Muse worked as a member of the Maryland State Ethics Commission. He became involved in politics after businessman Sydney Moore, who compared him to Adam Clayton Powell Jr., introduced him to influential Black politicians in county politics. In 1990, Muse unsuccessfully ran for the Maryland House of Delegates in District 27, challenging incumbent delegates Gary R. Alexander, Joseph F. Vallario Jr., and James E. Proctor Jr., all three of whom were running on a slate backed by Senate President Thomas V. Mike Miller Jr. During the campaign, he filed a complaint with the Prince George's County Police Department after discovering campaign signs that had defaced with racist phrases. Muse was defeated in the Democratic primary election, placing last with 18 percent of the vote. After his defeat, he moved to Tantallon, where he was invited to run for the House of Delegates in District 26 by state senator Gloria G. Lawlah.

=== Maryland General Assembly ===
Muse was sworn into the Maryland House of Delegates on January 11, 1995, where he was a member of the Ways and Means Committee. He did not seek re-election to a second term in 1998, instead mounting an unsuccessful campaign for state senate in District 26, challenging incumbent state senator Gloria Lawlah, whom he criticized for voting against school construction bills. He narrowly lost the Democratic primary to Lawlah by a margin of 267 votes, or two percent.

In June 2005, Muse told the Washington Post that he was exploring another run for state senator in District 26, again challenging Lawlah. He entered the race after Lawlah announced that she would not seek re-election in 2006, and defeated state delegate Obie Patterson in the Democratic primary election. In November 2006, Muse campaigned with Republican governor Bob Ehrlich.

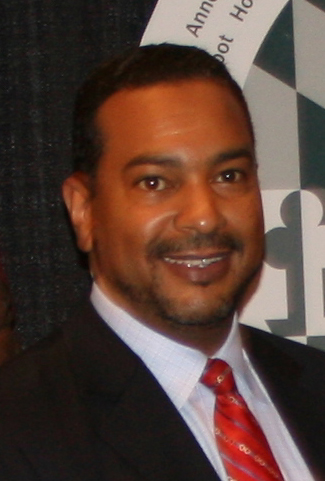
Muse in 2008

Muse was first sworn into the Maryland Senate on January 10, 2007. He served as a member of the Judicial Proceedings Committee from 2007 to 2010, and again from 2013 to 2019, and on the Finance Committee from 2010 to 2013. Muse was transferred from the Finance Committee to the Judicial Proceedings Committee for repeatedly opposing a bill proposed by Governor Martin O'Malley to strengthen the state's wind energy industry, a move he expressed frustration with.

In 2022, Muse filed to run for the Maryland Senate in District 26, seeking to succeed retiring state senator Obie Patterson. He narrowly won the Democratic primary election on July 19, defeating challenger Tamara Davis Brown by a margin of 345 votes, or 1.2 percent. He won the general election and was sworn in on January 11, 2023. Muse is a member of the Judicial Proceedings Committee.

In October 2025, Muse was hired to work as an ombudsman for Prince George's County's procurement office. State law does not normally allow General Assembly members to earn pay from secondary jobs in state or local government as a potential conflict of interest. After the Maryland General Assembly's Joint Committee on Legislative Ethics sent Muse a letter saying that it was unlawful for him to hold a county-level job while serving as a state senator, Muse refused to resign from his job and said that he would challenge the ethics committee's determination in court if necessary. Muse resigned from the Prince George's County procurement office in January 2026.

In March 2026, Sally D'Angelo, the owner of the Reynold's Tavern and 1747 Pub restaurant in Annapolis, accused Muse, his chief of staff, and an intern of threatening and harassing the business after having a negative dining experience. According to D'Angelo, Muse's chief of staff, Jasmine Hall, and an intern were having lunch at the restaurant when the intern found a long strand of hair tangled in the meat of her pulled pork sandwich, after which Hall sent the sandwich back and asked for it to be removed from the party's bill. The restaurant refused to compensate the meal after the restaurant's chef determined that the hair on the plate did not come from the kitchen, after which Hall identified herself as Muse's chief of staff and "threatened that she was important and knew important people". Later, Hall called Muse, who then allegedly called D'Angelo and threatened to have the restaurant's license revoked. Hall denied the allegations made against her and Muse, saying that while she identified herself as the senator's chief of staff, she did not make any threats toward the restaurant's owner and ultimately paid the bill in full, including the sandwich. She also said that Muse only asked D'Angelo to take the sandwich off the bill since Hall paid for the meal using his credit card.

=== Prince George's County Executive campaigns ===
==== 2002 ====
On May 19, 2002, Muse announced his campaign for Prince George's County Executive, seeking to succeed term-limited county executive Wayne K. Curry. During the Democratic primary, he ran on a platform of abolishing standardized testing and requiring uniforms in schools, and received endorsements from county religious leaders. Muse raised the second most funding out of candidates in the race with $347,000 cash on hand in August 2002, behind M. H. Jim Estepp.

Muse was defeated in the Democratic primary by eventual winner Jack B. Johnson, placing third with 18.7 percent of the vote.

==== 2018 ====
On June 26, 2017, Muse announced that he would again run for Prince George's County Executive in 2018, seeking to succeed term-limited county executive Rushern Baker. Muse was seen as one of the three frontrunners in the race, alongside state's attorney Angela Alsobrooks and former congresswoman Donna Edwards. He sought to position himself as an outsider rallying against the "political machine", and received endorsements from local labor unions.

Muse was defeated in the Democratic primary by Alsobrooks, placing third with 10 percent of the vote.

=== 2012 U.S. Senate campaign ===
In September 2011, Muse said that he was exploring a run for the U.S. Senate in 2012, challenging incumbent Senator Ben Cardin. He announced his candidacy on January 5, 2012, and ran on a platform of addressing foreclosures, education disparities, and high unemployment.

During the Democratic primary, Muse received endorsements from state religious leaders, but was heavily out-raised and out-funded by Cardin, who had the backing of the Maryland Democratic establishment and President Barack Obama, which led Muse to complain that the state party should "do a better job staying neutral" in the contest. Muse was defeated in the Democratic primary in April 2012, placing second and receiving 15.7 percent of the vote.

== Political positions ==
Muse has been described as a social conservative.

=== Crime and justice ===
In April 2004, Muse opened a 24-hour shelter at his Ark of Safety church to house victims of domestic abuse. In July 2005, he partnered with other churches and the Prince George's County Police Department to provide services to domestic violence victims and to create job training programs with local businesses in an effort to reduce violent crime in the county.

During the 2013 legislative session, Muse voted for a bill to abolish the death penalty.

In 2015, he introduced legislation to remove the governor of Maryland from the state's parole board.

During the 2017 legislative session, Muse introduced a bill that would repeal a rule adopted by the attorney general of Maryland that prevented courts from setting a high bail on low-income defendants.

=== Development initiatives ===
In 1996, Muse voted for a bill to provide state funding for the construction of FedExField.

In June 2011, Muse launched an effort aimed at blocking the construction of a high-end outlet store near National Harbor, which he claimed would create unmanageable traffic on Maryland Route 210.

=== Education ===
In 1996, Muse introduced a bill to create a task force on deciding whether to enforce mandatory uniforms at public schools. The bill passed and became law, and the task force recommended against uniforms later that year. In 1997, he introduced a bill that would require uniforms in public schools, despite the task force's recommendations, which passed the Prince George's County Delegation in a 11-9 vote.

In 1997, Muse introduced legislation that would make the Prince George's County Board of Education fully appointed. During his 2002 and 2018 county executive campaigns, he said he would support making the school board fully elected. He also expressed support for increasing teacher pay and to refurbish aging schools.

During the 2011 legislative session, Muse voted against Maryland's Dream Act, a bill that extended in-state tuition for undocumented immigrants.

In 2013, Muse was the only member of the Prince George's County Delegation to vote against a bill to give the Prince George's County Executive control over the county school system's budget.

=== Environment ===
Muse was opposed to legislation proposed by Governor Martin O'Malley to strengthen Maryland's wind energy industry.

=== Gambling ===
During the 2011 legislative session, during debate on a bill establishing a statewide referendum on expanding gambling in Maryland, Muse supported an amendment that would allow card games to be played at casinos, saying that card games "don't come with many of the same social ills as slots."

In February 2012, Muse said he opposed plans to build a billion-dollar casino near National Harbor and vowed to "do everything in my power" to stop the deal from passing. The bill passed the Maryland Senate in a 35-11 vote, with Muse being one of two Prince George's County-based senators to vote against it.

In February 2017, Muse voted against the nomination of Gordon Medenica to serve as the chair of the Maryland Lottery.

=== Gun policy ===
During the 2013 legislative session, Muse voted for the Firearm Safety Act, which placed restrictions on firearm purchases and magazine capacity in semi-automatic rifles.

=== LGBT rights ===
Muse opposes same-sex marriage on religious grounds. In 2007, he voted against a bill to ban discrimination against transgender people. In February 2011, Muse voted against a bill to legalize same-sex marriage in Maryland, predicting that the bill would open the doors to making polygamy and marriage between people of very different ages "acceptable."

During the 2012 legislative session, Muse attended rallies opposing and later voted against the Civil Marriage Protection Act. During debate on the bill, he introduced an amendment to rename it to the "Marriage Redefinition Act", saying that the bill would redefine marriage from being "between one man and one woman". After the bill became law and went to referendum, Muse donated to groups opposing the referendum.

In 2014, Muse voted for a bill to ban discrimination against transgender people.

=== Redistricting ===
During the 2011 special legislative session, Muse was the only Democratic state senator to vote against the congressional redistricting plan proposed by Governor Martin O'Malley, accusing the legislature of putting party politics before voters and manipulating minority communities. In November 2025, Muse said he supported calling a special session to pass a new congressional map making Maryland's 1st congressional district more favorable for Democrats in response to Republican mid-decade redistricting efforts in various red states, saying that Democrats "cannot let Trump continue to do what he's doing and let Democrats look weak–as though we're doing nothing".

=== Social issues ===
In 1998, Muse said he opposed abortion. During the 2023 legislative session, Muse voted in favor of putting a referendum to codify reproductive rights before voters in 2024.

During the 2016 legislative session, Muse voted against a bill to legalize palliative care for terminally ill patients. In March 2023, he expressed openness to voting for a bill to legalize palliative care.

In August 2017, after Senate President Thomas V. Mike Miller Jr. defended Roger B. Taney, the former Supreme Court Chief Justice who authored the infamous Dred Scott decision, Muse called for his censure. No action was taken.

=== Taxes ===
During his 2002 county executive campaign, Muse said he would support lifting Prince George's County's cap on property taxes. In 2012, he voted for a bill that would allow full funding of any school spending plan approved by the County Council. During the 2015 legislative session, Muse introduced legislation that sought to block a proposed 15 percent property tax increase in Prince George's County.

In 2012, Muse voted against a bill to raise income taxes on Maryland's wealthiest residents.

== Personal life ==
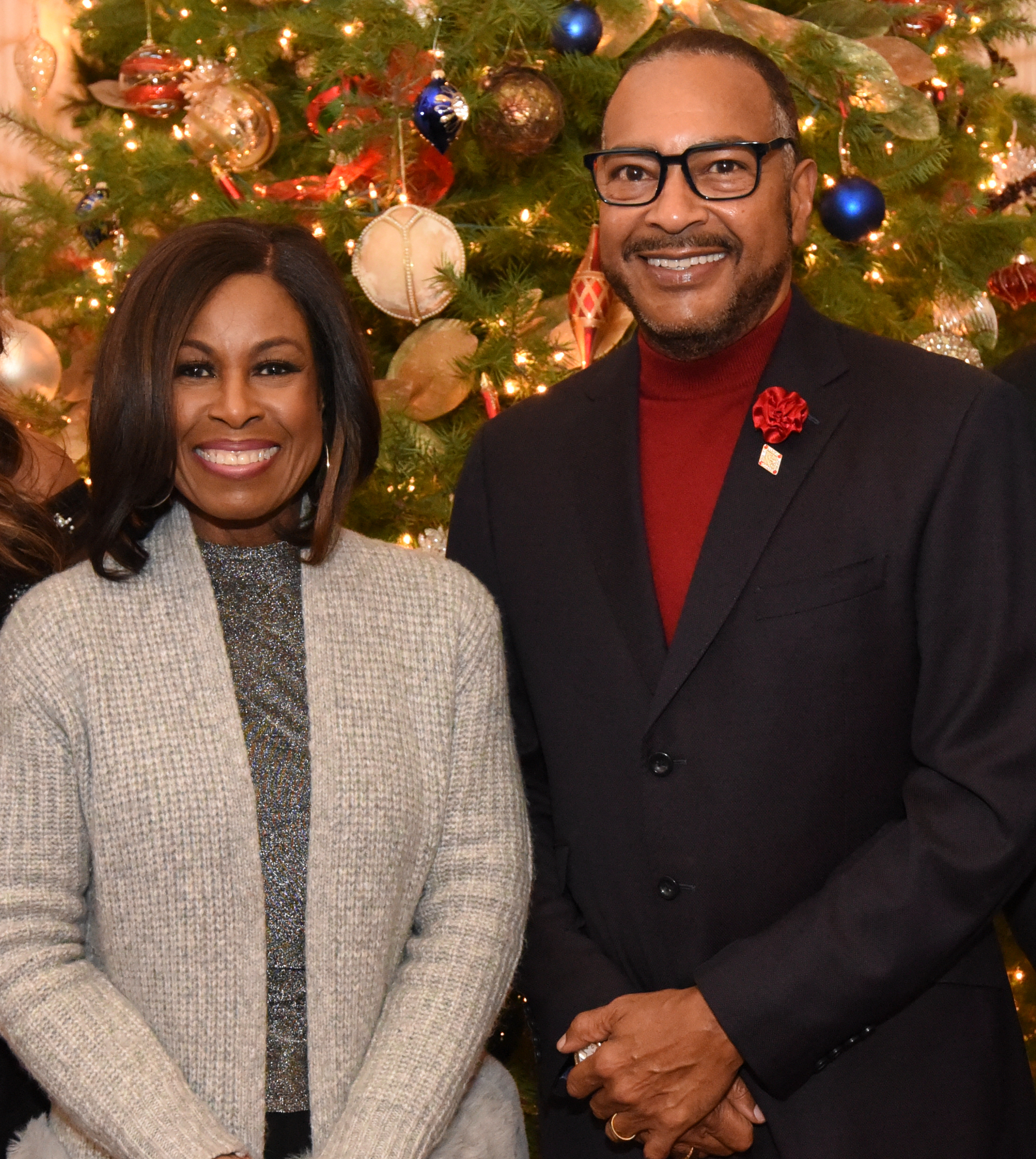
Muse and his wife, 2023

Muse is married to Pat Lawson Muse, an anchor for WRC-TV. Together, they have a daughter, whom they adopted after Muse officiated the funeral of her mother.

== Electoral history ==
Maryland House of Delegates District 27 Democratic primary election, 1990
Party	Candidate	Votes	%
Democratic	James E. Proctor Jr. (incumbent)	8,683	27.8
Democratic	Gary R. Alexander (incumbent)	8,504	27.3
Democratic	Joseph F. Vallario Jr. (incumbent)	8,125	26.0
Democratic	C. Anthony Muse	5,888	18.8

Maryland House of Delegates District 26 Democratic primary election, 1994
Party	Candidate	Votes	%
Democratic	C. Anthony Muse	8,716	24
Democratic	David Mercado Valderrama (incumbent)	6,657	18
Democratic	Obie Patterson	6,234	17
Democratic	Rosa Lee Blumenthal	4,187	12
Democratic	Christine M. Jones	3,953	11
Democratic	Napoleon Lechoco	1,997	6
Democratic	Charles H. French	1,784	5
Democratic	Gloria E. Horton	1,215	3
Democratic	Henry W. Harris Sr.	762	2
Democratic	Leighton D. Williams	545	2

Maryland House of Delegates District 26 election, 1994
Party	Candidate	Votes	%
Democratic	C. Anthony Muse	17,807	27
Democratic	David M. Valderrama	17,206	26
Democratic	Obie Patterson	16,483	25
Republican	Max L. Buff	4,814	7
Republican	Claude W. Roxborough	4,612	7
Republican	Erich H. Schmidt	4,215	6

Maryland Senate District 26 Democratic primary election, 1998
Party	Candidate	Votes	%
Democratic	Gloria G. Lawlah (incumbent)	6,567	51.0
Democratic	C. Anthony Muse	6,300	49.0

Prince George's County Executive Democratic primary election, 2002
Party	Candidate	Votes	%
Democratic	Jack B. Johnson	39,503	37.0
Democratic	M. H. Jim Estepp	20,748	19.5
Democratic	C. Anthony Muse	19,976	18.7
Democratic	Rushern Baker	13,344	12.5
Democratic	Major Riddick	13,102	12.3

Maryland Senate District 26 Democratic primary election, 2006
Party	Candidate	Votes	%
Democratic	C. Anthony Muse	9,846	55.1
Democratic	Obie Patterson	8,028	44.9

Maryland Senate District 26 election, 2006
Party	Candidate	Votes	%
Democratic	C. Anthony Muse	26,361	98.8
Write-in		310	1.2

Maryland Senate District 26 election, 2010
Party	Candidate	Votes	%
Democratic	C. Anthony Muse	30,492	99.5
Write-in		167	0.5

Maryland Senate District 26 election, 2010
Party	Candidate	Votes	%
Democratic	C. Anthony Muse (incumbent)	30,492	99.5
Write-in		167	0.5

United States Senate Democratic primary election in Maryland, 2012
Party	Candidate	Votes	%
Democratic	Ben Cardin (incumbent)	240,704	74.2
Democratic	C. Anthony Muse	50,807	15.7
Democratic	Chris Garner	9,274	2.9
Democratic	Raymond Levi Blagmon	5,909	1.8
Democratic	J. P. Cusick	4,778	1.5
Democratic	Blaine Taylor	4,376	1.3
Democratic	Lih Young	3,993	1.2
Democratic	Ralph Jaffe	3,313	1.0
Democratic	Ed Tinus	1,064	0.3

Maryland Senate District 26 election, 2014
Party	Candidate	Votes	%
Democratic	C. Anthony Muse (incumbent)	29,753	89.6
Republican	Kelley Howells	3,370	10.1
Write-in		93	0.3

Prince George's County Executive Democratic primary election, 2018
Party	Candidate	Votes	%
Democratic	Angela Alsobrooks	80,784	61.8
Democratic	Donna F. Edwards	31,781	24.3
Democratic	C. Anthony Muse	13,127	10.0
Democratic	Paul Monteiro	2,748	2.1
Democratic	Michael E. Kennedy	728	0.6
Democratic	Tommie Thompson	510	0.4
Democratic	Lewis S. Johnson	416	0.3
Democratic	Billy Bridges	340	0.3
Democratic	Samuel Bogley	308	0.2

Maryland Senate District 26 Democratic primary election, 2022
Party	Candidate	Votes	%
Democratic	C. Anthony Muse	10,627	50.8
Democratic	Tamara Davis Brown	10,282	49.2

Maryland Senate District 26 election, 2022
Party	Candidate	Votes	%
Democratic	C. Anthony Muse	33,314	92.3
Republican	Ike Puzon	2,645	7.3
Write-in		138	0.4
