= Middleton Tavern =

One of the oldest continuously operating taverns in the US

Coordinates: 38°58′42″N 76°29′13″W

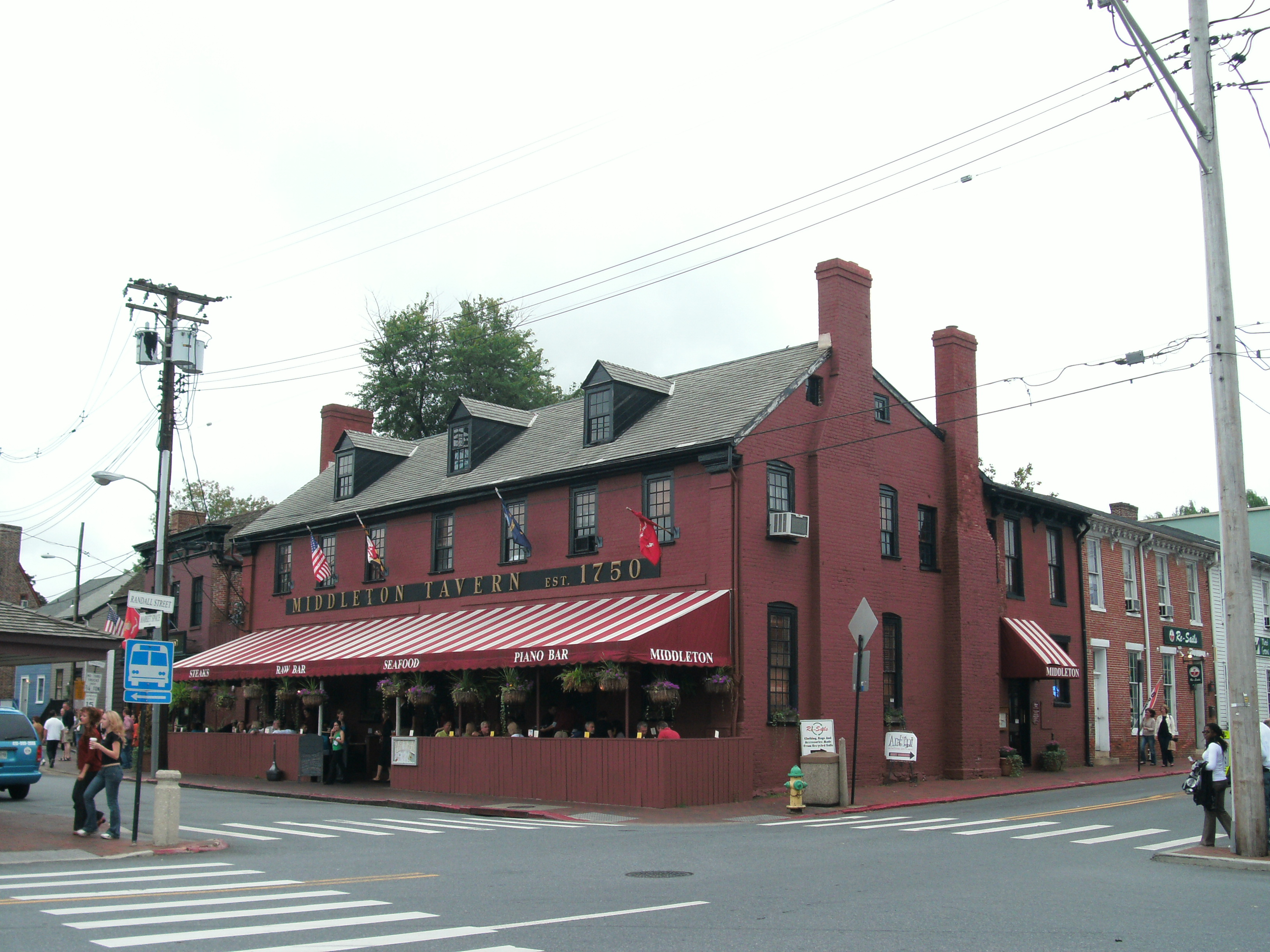
Middleton Tavern in 2009

Middleton Tavern is a tavern in Annapolis, Maryland. It is one of the oldest continuously operating taverns in the United States.

== History ==
The Middleton Tavern was established in 1750 by Horatio Middleton. It initially operated as an inn for seafaring men. After Horatio's death, his son, Manuel, ran the business. George Washington, Thomas Jefferson, Benjamin Franklin and members of the Continental Congress were known to frequent the tavern.

During the 1800s the family business included a general store and meat market. The Mandris family then bought the business and established a restaurant and a souvenir shop. Jerry Hardesty bought the property at 1968 and renamed the business into Middleton Tavern.

Local folklore suggests a ghost haunts the tavern, leaving a scent of cigar smoke on the upper balcony. Staff have given the entity the name "Roland" and some describe him as wearing Revolutionary-era clothing. Another local theory suggests the establishment is haunted by the ghost of George Schmidt, who was killed in front of the building in 1876. Today, the Tavern appears on a number of "ghost tours" of the Chesapeake Bay watershed region.

== Description ==
The building is of Georgian style architecture. It is a 3-story brick structure. Its walls are decorated with civil war muskets and antique naval uniforms.

== See also ==
- Reynold's Tavern
