= Kris Valderrama =

American politician (born 1970)

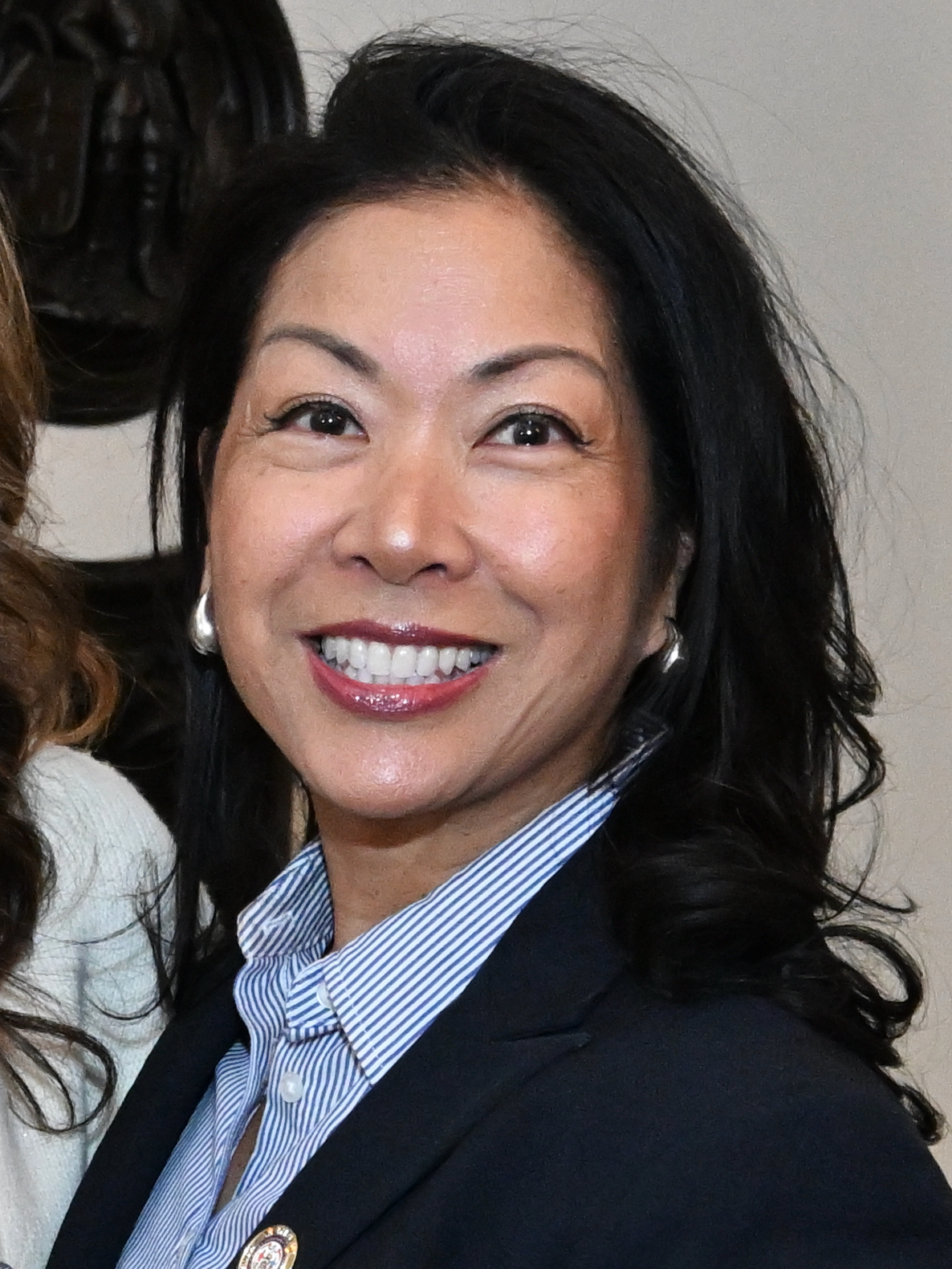
- Valderrama in 2025

Member of the Maryland House of Delegates from the 26th district
- Incumbent
- Assumed office January 10, 2007 Serving with Veronica L. Turner, Jamila Woods
- Preceded by: Obie Patterson

Personal details
- Born: Kriselda Valderrama; November 17, 1970 (age 55) Washington, D.C., U.S.
- Party: Democratic
- Spouse: Abraham A. Lobo
- Children: 2
- Parent: David Valderrama (father)
- Education: Salisbury University (BS)

Kriselda Valderrama-Lobo (born November 17, 1970) is an American politician who represents District 26 in the Maryland House of Delegates.

== Early life and career ==
Kriselda Valderrama was born in Washington, D.C. to David Valderrama, a judge in Prince George's County, Maryland and Maryland State Delegate representing District 26. She is of Filipino ancestry. She graduated from Oxon Hill Senior High School, and earned a Bachelor of Science degree in respiratory therapy from Salisbury University.

== In the legislature ==
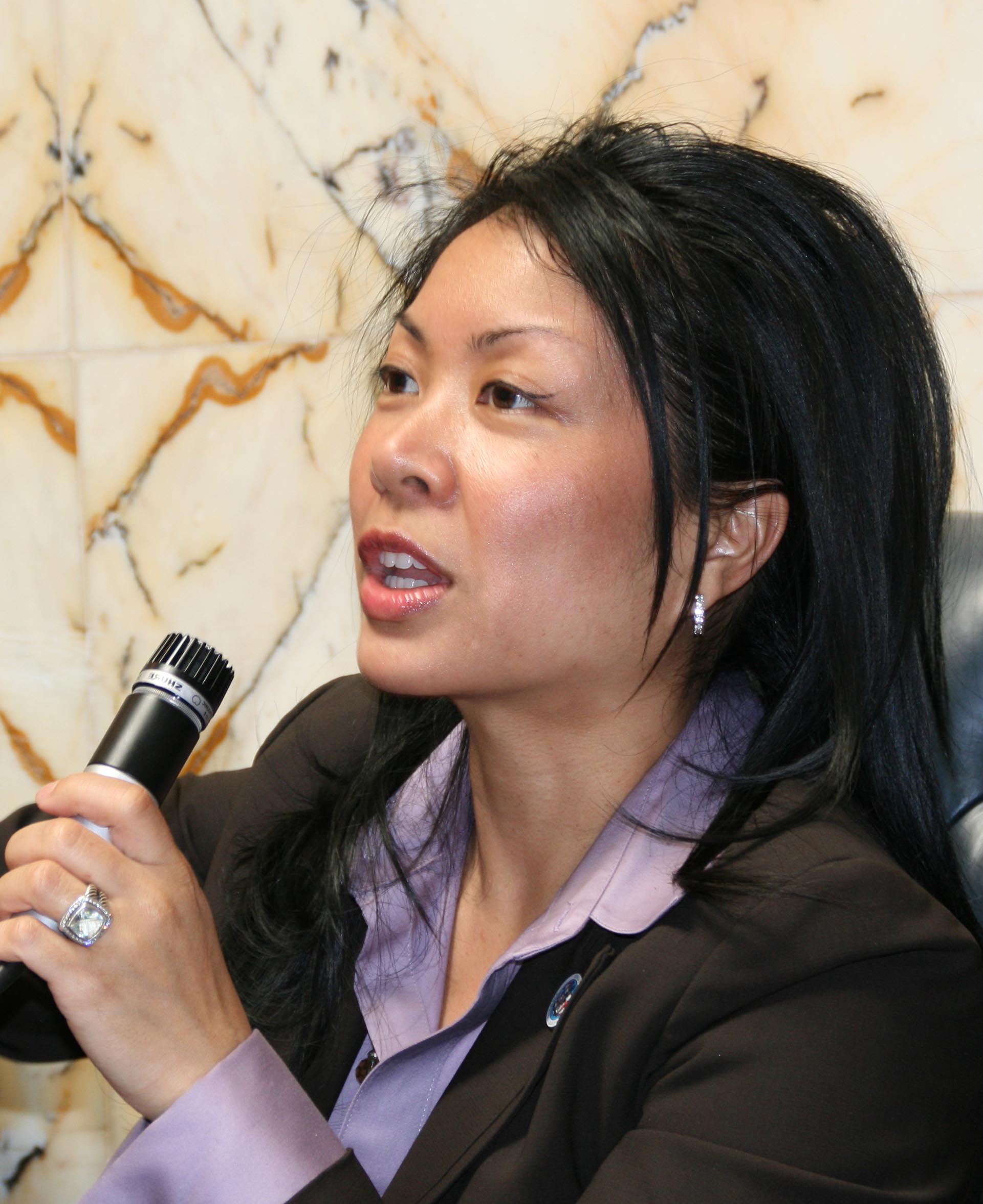
Valderrama speaks in the Maryland House of Delegates, April 2009

Valderrama was sworn into the Maryland House of Delegates on January 10, 2007. She was a deputy majority whip from 2011 to 2018, and has served as the deputy majority leader of the House of Delegates since 2022.

Valderrama was a member of the Judiciary Committee from 2007 to 2015, afterwards serving on the Economic Matters Committee. In December 2025, she became the chair of the Economic Matters Committee, becoming the first Asian American committee chair and the first woman to chair the committee. Valderrama has also been a member of the Rules and Executive Nominations Committee since 2021. She is a member of the Prince George's County Delegation, the Legislative Asian-American and Pacific-Islander Caucus, the Women Legislators of Maryland, and the Legislative Transit Caucus.

== Political positions ==
=== Paid family leave ===
Valderrama introduced legislation during the 2020 legislative session to provide all Maryland workers with up to 12 weeks of paid family leave. The bill was reintroduced in 2022, during which it passed and became law after the General Assembly voted to override Governor Larry Hogan's veto.

=== National politics ===
Valderrama endorsed Hillary Clinton for president on April 9, 2016.

=== Social issues ===
Valderrama was a co-sponsor of the Civil Marriage Protection Act, a bill to legalize same-sex marriage in Maryland. The bill passed the House of Delegates by a vote of 72-67 and was signed into law by Governor Martin O'Malley on March 2, 2012.

Valderrama introduced legislation in the 2016 legislative session to prohibit employers from excluding women from desirable positions and for employers to retaliate against employees for sharing salary information with co-workers.

Valderrama introduced legislation in the 2018 legislative session to block employers from imposing non-disclosure agreements on workers reporting sexual harassment and require employers with more than 50 workers to disclose information about their records in maintaining harassment-free workplaces. The bill passed and was signed into law on May 16, 2018.

== Personal life ==
Valderrama is married and has two children. She attends religious services at the St. Columba Catholic Church in Oxon Hill, Maryland.

== Electoral history ==
Maryland House of Delegates District 26 Democratic Primary Election, 2006
Party	Candidate	Votes	%
Democratic	Veronica Turner	8,489	19.1
Democratic	Jay Walker	6,184	13.9
Democratic	Kris Valderrama	6,177	13.9
Democratic	Ollie Anderson	6,087	13.7
Democratic	Darryl A. Kelley	5,125	11.6
Democratic	Earl Adams	4,603	10.4
Democratic	Jerry J. Mathis	2,972	6.7
Democratic	Nathaniel Bryant	1,939	4.4
Democratic	Xavier Aragona	1,823	4.1
Democratic	Jocelyne G. Stichberry	947	2.1

Maryland House of Delegates District 26 Election, 2006
Party	Candidate	Votes	%
Democratic	Veronica Turner	24,891	34.1
Democratic	Kris Valderrama	22,231	30.5
Democratic	Jay Walker	22,162	30.4
Republican	John Rowe	3,587	4.9
Write-In		108	0.1

Maryland House of Delegates District 26 Democratic Primary Election, 2010
Party	Candidate	Votes	%
Democratic	Veronica Turner	9,133	25.3
Democratic	Jay Walker	8,181	22.7
Democratic	Kris Valderrama	6,889	19.1
Democratic	Ollie Anderson	5,302	14.7
Democratic	Sidney L. Gibson	3,703	10.3
Democratic	Hopal "Hope" Felton	1,540	4.3
Democratic	Branndon D. Jackson	1,318	3.7

Maryland House of Delegates District 26 Election, 2010
Party	Candidate	Votes	%
Democratic	Veronica Turner	27,770	35.0
Democratic	Jay Walker	24,328	30.7
Democratic	Kris Valderrama	24,141	30.5
Republican	Holly Ellison Henderson	2,916	3.7
Write-In		107	0.1

Maryland House of Delegates District 26 Democratic Primary Election, 2014
Party	Candidate	Votes	%
Democratic	Jay Walker	9,428	24.3
Democratic	Kris Valderrama	8,217	21.2
Democratic	Tony Knotts	8,129	21.0
Democratic	Tamara Davis Brown	5,698	14.7
Democratic	David Sloan	2,782	7.2
Democratic	Leonard "Lennie" Moses	3,475	7.2
Democratic	Xavier A. Aragona	1,692	4.4
Democratic	Keith L. Gray	1,359	3.5
Democratic	Vernon O. Holmes, Jr.	877	2.3

Maryland House of Delegates District 26 Democratic Primary Election, 2014
Party	Candidate	Votes	%
Democratic	Tony Knotts	27,487	35.2
Democratic	Jay Walker	25,434	32.6
Democratic	Kris Valderrama	24,821	31.8
Write-In		287	0.4

Maryland House of Delegates District 26 Democratic Primary Election, 2018
Party	Candidate	Votes	%
Democratic	Jay Walker	11,749	24.3
Democratic	Veronica Turner	10,197	21.1
Democratic	Kris Valderrama	9,590	19.8
Democratic	David Sloan	4,403	9.2
Democratic	Sade Oshinubi	4,153	8.6
Democratic	Leonard "Lennie" Moses	3,475	7.2
Democratic	Diedra Henry-Spires	2,912	6.0
Democratic	Sean Chao	1,812	3.8

Maryland House of Delegates District 26 Election, 2018
Party	Candidate	Votes	%
Democratic	Veronica Turner	35,748	35.1
Democratic	Kris Valderrama	32,523	32.0
Democratic	Jay Walker	11,749	24.3
Democratic	Diedra Henry-Spires (Write In)	1,852	1.8
Write-In		509	0.5
