= Maryland Legislative District 26 =

American legislative district

Maryland's legislative district 26
- Represents part of Prince George's County
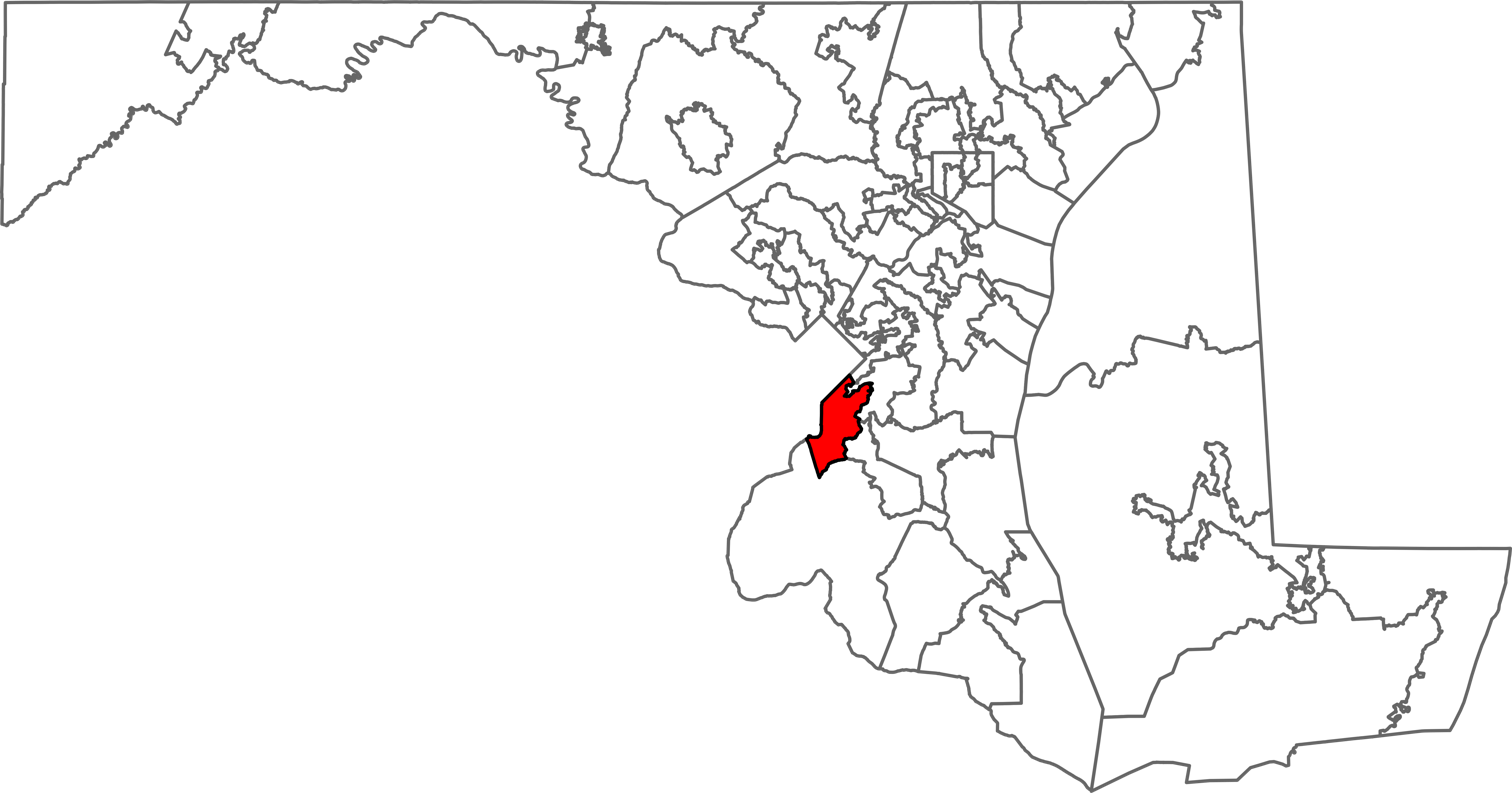
- Senator: C. Anthony Muse (D)
- Delegate(s): Veronica L. Turner (D); Kriselda Valderrama (D); Jamila Woods (D)
- Registration: 81.9% Democratic; 5.0% Republican; 11.1% unaffiliated
- Demographics: 7.4% White; 70.3% Black/African American; 0.6% Native American; 4.3% Asian; 0.0% Hawaiian/Pacific Islander; 11.4% Other race; 6.0% Two or more races; 15.9% Hispanic
- Population (2020): 126,356
- Voting-age population: 101,304
- Registered voters: 89,715

Maryland Legislative District 26 is one of 47 districts in the state for the Maryland General Assembly. It covers part of Prince George's County. The district is represented by three delegates in the Maryland House of Delegates.

== Demographic characteristics ==
As of the 2020 United States census, the district had a population of 126,356, of whom 101,304 (80.2%) were of voting age. The racial makeup of the district was 9,380 (7.4%) White, 88,836 (70.3%) African American, 721 (0.6%) Native American, 5,387 (4.3%) Asian, 13 (0.0%) Pacific Islander, 14,383 (11.4%) from some other race, and 7,545 (6.0%) from two or more races. Hispanic or Latino of any race were 20,030 (15.9%) of the population.

The district had 89,715 registered voters as of October 17, 2020, of whom 9,921 (11.1%) were registered as unaffiliated, 4,452 (5.0%) were registered as Republicans, 73,466 (81.9%) were registered as Democrats, and 1,597 (1.8%) were registered to other parties.

== Political representation ==
The district is represented for the 2023–2027 legislative term in the State Senate by C. Anthony Muse (D) and in the House of Delegates by Veronica L. Turner (D), Kriselda Valderrama (D) and Jamila Woods (D).

== Election history ==
Years	Senator	Party	Electoral history
January 8, 1975 – January 10, 1979	Steny Hoyer	Democratic	Redistricted from District 4-C and re-elected in 1974. Retired to run for lieutenant governor.
January 10, 1979 – January 12, 1983	B. W. Mike Donovan	Democratic	Elected in 1978. Redistricted to the 25th district.
January 12, 1983 – January 9, 1991	Frank Komenda	Democratic	Elected in 1982. Re-elected in 1986. Lost renomination.
January 9, 1991 – January 10, 2007	Gloria G. Lawlah	Democratic	Elected in 1990. Re-elected in 1994. Re-elected in 1998. Re-elected in 2002. Retired.
January 10, 2007 – January 9, 2019	C. Anthony Muse	Democratic	Elected in 2006. Re-elected in 2010. Re-elected in 2014. Retired to run for Prince George's County executive.
January 9, 2019 – January 11, 2023	Obie Patterson	Democratic	Elected in 2018. Retired.
January 11, 2023 – present	C. Anthony Muse	Democratic	Elected in 2022. Re-elected in 2026.
