= Frank Komenda =

American politician

Member of the Maryland Senate from the 26th district
- In office January 12, 1983 – January 9, 1991
- Preceded by: B. W. Mike Donovan
- Succeeded by: Gloria G. Lawlah

Member of the Maryland House of Delegates from the 27th district
- In office January 8, 1975 – January 12, 1983
- Preceded by: District created
- Succeeded by: Multi-member district

Personal details
- Born: November 25, 1934 Washington, D.C.
- Died: November 15, 2010 (aged 75) Annapolis, Maryland
- Party: Democratic

Frank Komenda (November 25, 1934 – November 15, 2010) was an American politician who served in the Maryland House of Delegates from the 27th district from 1975 to 1983 and in the Maryland Senate from the 26th district from 1983 to 1991.

He died on November 15, 2010, in Annapolis, Maryland, at age 75.
