= Reynold's Tavern =

Coordinates: 38°58′41.3″N 76°29′36.1″W

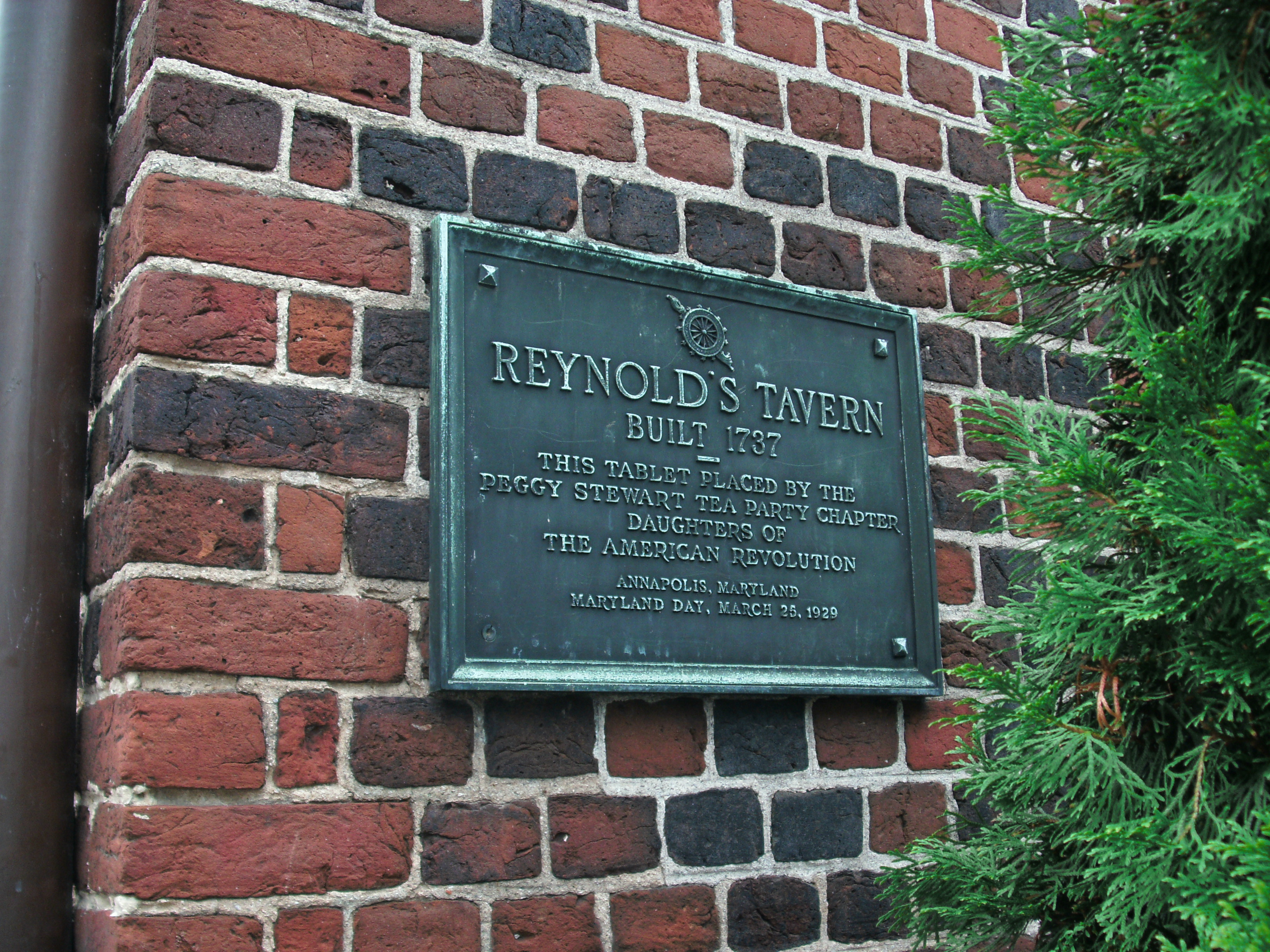
- Interactive map of the Reynold's Tavern area

Reynold's Tavern is an 18th-century tavern located at 7 Church Circle in Annapolis, Maryland. It is the oldest tavern in Annapolis, and one of the oldest in the United States although it was not always operated as a tavern. Enslaved Black people were bought and sold at Reynold's Tavern. The building has been nominated to be included on the National Register of Historic Places.

== See also ==
- Middleton Tavern
