= Obie Patterson =

American politician

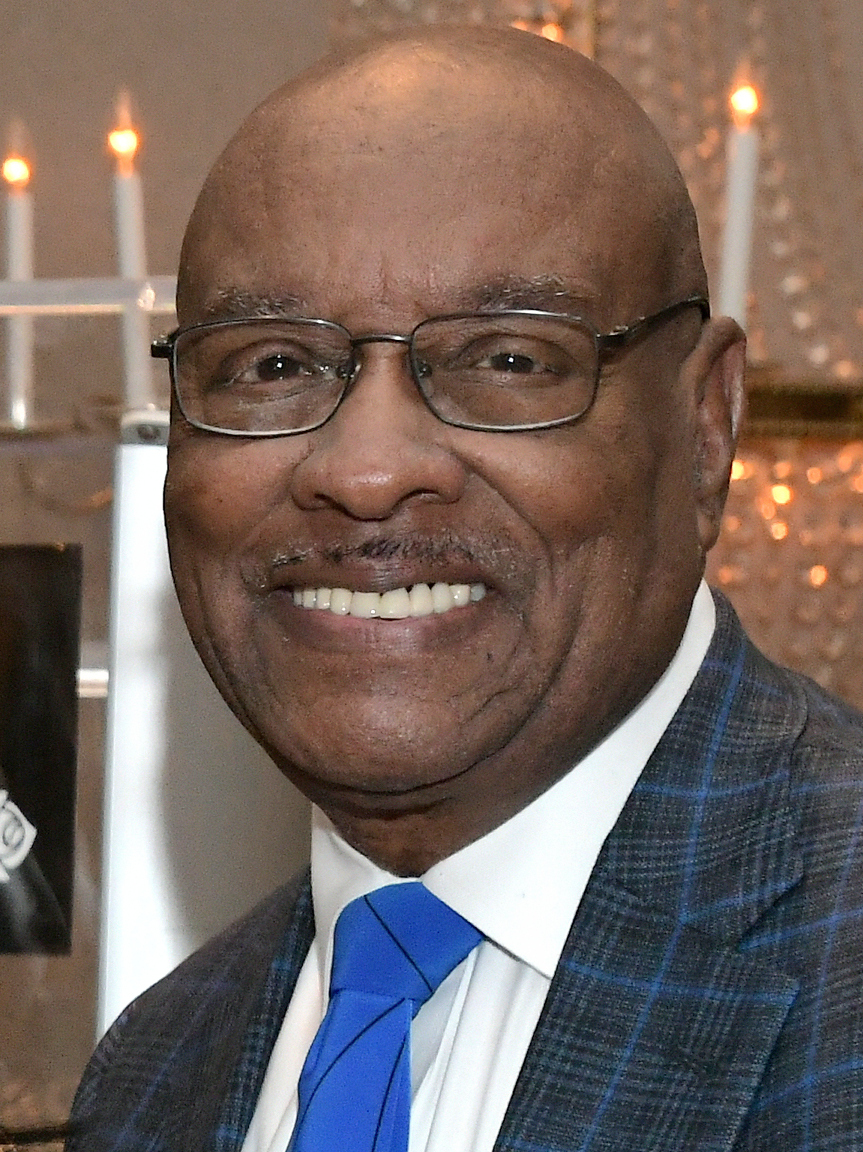

Member of the Maryland Senate from the 26th district
- In office January 9, 2019 – January 11, 2023
- Preceded by: C. Anthony Muse
- Succeeded by: C. Anthony Muse
- Constituency: Prince George's County, Maryland

Prince George's County Council
- In office December 6, 2010 – December 3, 2018
- Succeeded by: Monique Anderson-Walker
- Constituency: District 8

Member of the Maryland House of Delegates from the 26th district
- In office January 11, 1995 – January 10, 2007 Serving with C. Anthony Muse, David Mercado Valderrama, Kerry Hill, Darryl A. Kelley, and Veronica L. Turner
- Preceded by: Christine M. Jones
- Succeeded by: Kris Valderrama

Personal details
- Born: March 7, 1938 (age 88) Lancaster, South Carolina, U.S.
- Party: Democratic
- Children: Three children; three grandchildren.
- Education: Johnson C. Smith University (BS); University of Florida (MA)

Obie Patterson (born March 7, 1938) is an American politician. He was previously a Democratic member of the Maryland Senate from the 26th district in Prince George's County. He served on the Prince George's County Council representing District 8, and in the Maryland House of Delegates representing the 26th district.

== Background ==
Patterson was born in Lancaster, South Carolina on March 7, 1938. He attended Johnson C. Smith University in Charlotte, North Carolina, where he earned a Bachelor of Science degree in biology in 1965, and the University of Florida, where he earned a Master of Arts degree in public administration in 1971. After graduating, he served in a variety of roles at the U.S. Department of Agriculture.

== Political career ==
Patterson was a member of House of Delegates from January 11, 1995, and to January 10, 2007. He served as the Chair of the Legislative Black Caucus of Maryland from 2002 to 2004. In 2006, Patterson unsuccessfully ran for Maryland Senate in District 26, losing to former state Delegate C. Anthony Muse in the Democratic primary by a 55%-45% margin.

In 2010, Patterson was elected to serve on the Prince George's County Council in District 8. Termed out of running for re-election, he ran for the Maryland Senate in 2018, seeking to succeed C. Anthony Muse, who decided against running for another term to run for county executive of Prince George's County.

In September 2018, the Prince George's County Republican Party filed an ethics complaint against Patterson, claiming that his county government staff used a government email address to distribute an invitation to a reception featuring Democratic gubernatorial nominee Ben Jealous. He won the general election in November 2018 with 92.5 percent of the vote and was sworn in on January 9, 2019. Later that month, President of the Maryland Senate Thomas V. Miller Jr. appointed Patterson to serve as the deputy majority whip of the Maryland Senate Democratic Caucus.

On April 6, 2022, he announced that he would not seek re-election to the Maryland Senate.

== Political positions ==
=== Development initiatives ===
Patterson opposed Governor Larry Hogan's proposal to construct a pro football stadium on a large parcel of federal land in Oxon Hill, saying "I don't know how anyone can think about bringing the Redskins there without some drastic increase in better transportation".

=== Environment ===
During the 2021 legislative session, Patterson voted for the Climate Solutions Now Act, saying that he "reluctantly" supported the legislation. In the same year, he introduced various environmental bills, including:

- Senate Bill 70, which would require the state to establish uniform standards for mold assessment and remediation
- Senate Bill 121, which would require the Commission on Environmental Justice and Sustainable Communities to develop policy recommendations on clan energy projects and investments to benefit low-income communities
- Senate Bill 151, which would amend the Maryland State Constitution to establish a right to a healthy environment

=== Health care ===
During the 2006 legislative session, Patterson voted to override Governor Bob Ehrlich's veto of the Fair Share Health Care Fund Act, which would require Walmart to pay more for employee health care.

During the 2019 legislative session, Patterson refused to cast a vote on the End-of-Life Option Act, which would have provided palliative care to terminally ill adults, causing the bill to die in a tied 23–23 vote. On his decision not to vote, Patterson said he had no regrets about decision, adding, "I did not cast a vote simply because I could not bring myself to move right or left on the bill and therefore I didn't vote on all. I don't know if it is [a violation of Senate rules] but I had to vote my conscience and that's what I did". In 2020, when the bill was reintroduced, Patterson said that he would cast a vote if the bill came up for a vote again, but did not say how he planned to vote.

=== Policing ===
During the 2021 legislative session, Patterson introduced legislation that would allow police officers to arrest a person based on witness testimony and video evidence. Patterson voted in favor of the General Assembly's police reform package.

=== Social issues ===
During the 2001 legislative session, Patterson voted in favor of legislation to implement a two-year moratorium on Maryland's use of capital punishment. The bill passed the Maryland House of Delegates by a vote of 82–54. He also voted in favor of legislation to add gays and lesbians to the state's anti-discrimination law, which passed in a 88–50 vote.

During the 2021 legislative session, Patterson introduced legislation that would rename Indian Head Highway after former President Barack Obama. The bill died in the Maryland Senate after its first reading a month later. He also introduced a bill that would replace Columbus Day with Indigenous Peoples' Day.

== Electoral history ==
Maryland House of Delegates District 26 Democratic primary election, 1994
Party	Candidate	Votes	%
Democratic	C. Anthony Muse	8,716	24
Democratic	David Mercado Valderrama	6,657	18
Democratic	Obie Patterson	6,234	17
Democratic	Rosa Lee Blumenthal	4,187	12
Democratic	Christine M. Jones	3,953	11
Democratic	Napoleon Lechoco	1,997	6
Democratic	Charles H. French	1,784	5
Democratic	Gloria E. Horton	1,215	3
Democratic	Henry W. Harris Sr.	762	2
Democratic	Leighton D. Williams	545	2

Maryland House of Delegates District 26 election, 1994
Party	Candidate	Votes	%
Democratic	C. Anthony Muse	17,807	27
Democratic	David M. Valderrama	17,206	26
Democratic	Obie Patterson	16,483	25
Republican	Max L. Buff	4,814	7
Republican	Claude W. Roxborough	4,612	7
Republican	Erich H. Schmidt	4,215	6

Maryland House of Delegates District 26 election, 1998
Party	Candidate	Votes	%
Democratic	Obie Patterson	23,465	34
Democratic	David M. Valderrama	23,269	33
Democratic	Kerry Hill	23,174	33

Maryland House of Delegates District 26 election, 2002
Party	Candidate	Votes	%
Democratic	Veronica L. Turner	22,482	29.8
Democratic	Obie Patterson	21,794	28.9
Democratic	Darryl A. Kelley	21,306	28.2
Republican	JoAnn Fisher	3,675	4.9
Republican	Dale L. Anderson	3,562	4.7
Republican	Max Buff	2,623	3.5
Write-in		38	0.1

Maryland Senate District 26 Democratic primary election, 2006
Party	Candidate	Votes	%
Democratic	C. Anthony Muse	9,846	55.1
Democratic	Obie Patterson	8,028	44.9

Prince George's County Council District 8 Democratic primary election, 2010
Party	Candidate	Votes	%
Democratic	Obie Patterson	5,209	41.4
Democratic	Betty Horton-Hodge	3,661	29.1
Democratic	Jerry J. Mathis	1,576	12.5
Democratic	Trevor Otts	1,012	8.0
Democratic	Antwan Brown	449	3.6
Democratic	Archie L. O'Neil	446	3.5
Democratic	André D. Nottingham	244	1.9

Prince George's County Council District 8 election, 2010
Party	Candidate	Votes	%
Democratic	Obie Patterson	25,816	99.5
Write-in		127	0.5

Prince George's County Council District 8 election, 2014
Party	Candidate	Votes	%
Democratic	Obie Patterson	24,187	99.5
Write-in		127	0.5

Maryland Senate District 26 Democratic primary election, 2018
Party	Candidate	Votes	%
Democratic	Obie Patterson	11,516	58.1
Democratic	Jamila J. Woods	8,321	41.9

Maryland Senate District 26 election, 2018
Party	Candidate	Votes	%
Democratic	Obie Patterson	42,929	92.5
Republican	Ike Puzon	3,280	7.1
Write-in		183	0.4
