= Prince George's County Delegation =

Delegation in the Maryland General Assembly

- Prince George's County House Delegation
- Prince George's County within Maryland
- Named after: Prince George's County, Maryland
- Established: 1696
- Headquarters: House Office Building, 6 Bladen St.
- Chairman: Nicole Williams
- 1st Vice-Chair: Andrea Harrison
- 2nd Vice-Chair: Kevin Harris
- Website: https://princegeorgeshousedelegation.com/

The Prince George's County Delegation refers to the 23 delegates who are elected from districts in Prince George's County, Maryland, to serve in the Maryland House of Delegates.

== Authority and responsibilities ==
The Delegation is responsible for representing the interests, needs and concerns of the citizens of Prince George's County in the Maryland General Assembly. For comprehensive information regarding hearing and meeting schedules, their website provides all up-to-date calendars.

== Current members ==
District	Counties represented	Delegate	Party	First elected	Committee
21	Anne Arundel, Prince George's	Mary A. Lehman	Democratic	2018	
21	Anne Arundel, Prince George's	Ben Barnes	Democratic	2006	Economic Matters
21	Anne Arundel, Prince George's	Joseline Pena-Melnyk	Democratic	2006	Health and Government Operations
22	Prince George's				
22	Prince George's	Anne Healey	Democratic	1990	Environmental Matters
22	Prince George's	Alonzo T. Washington	Democratic		
23A	Prince George's	Geraldine Valentino-Smith	Democratic	2012	Appropriations
23B	Prince George's	Ron Watson	Democratic	2018	Judiciary
23B	Prince George's	Marvin E. Holmes, Jr.	Democratic	2002	Environmental Matters
24	Prince George's	Andrea Harrison	Democratic	2018	Environment and Transportation
24	Prince George's	Erek Barron	Democratic	2014	Health and Government Operations
24	Prince George's	Jazz Lewis	Democratic	2014	Judiciary
25	Prince George's	Nick Charles	Democratic	2018	Health and Government Operations
25	Prince George's	Dereck E. Davis	Democratic	1994	Economic Matters (Chair)
25	Prince George's	Darryl Barnes	Democratic	2014	Ways and Means
26	Prince George's	Kris Valderrama	Democratic	2006	Judiciary
26	Prince George's	Jay Walker	Democratic	2006	Ways and Means
26	Prince George's	Veronica L. Turner	Democratic		
27A	Calvert, Prince George's	Elizabeth G. (Susie) Proctor	Democratic		Appropriations
27B	Calvert, Prince George's	Michael A. Jackson	Democratic	2014	Appropriations
47A	Prince George's	Diana M. Fennell	Democratic	2006	Ways and Means
47A	Prince George's	Julian Ivey	Democratic	2018	Ways & Means
47B	Prince George's	Wanika B. Fisher	Democratic	2018	Judiciary

== See also ==
- Current members of the Maryland State Senate
