= Jay Walker (politician) =

American politician and athlete (born 1972)

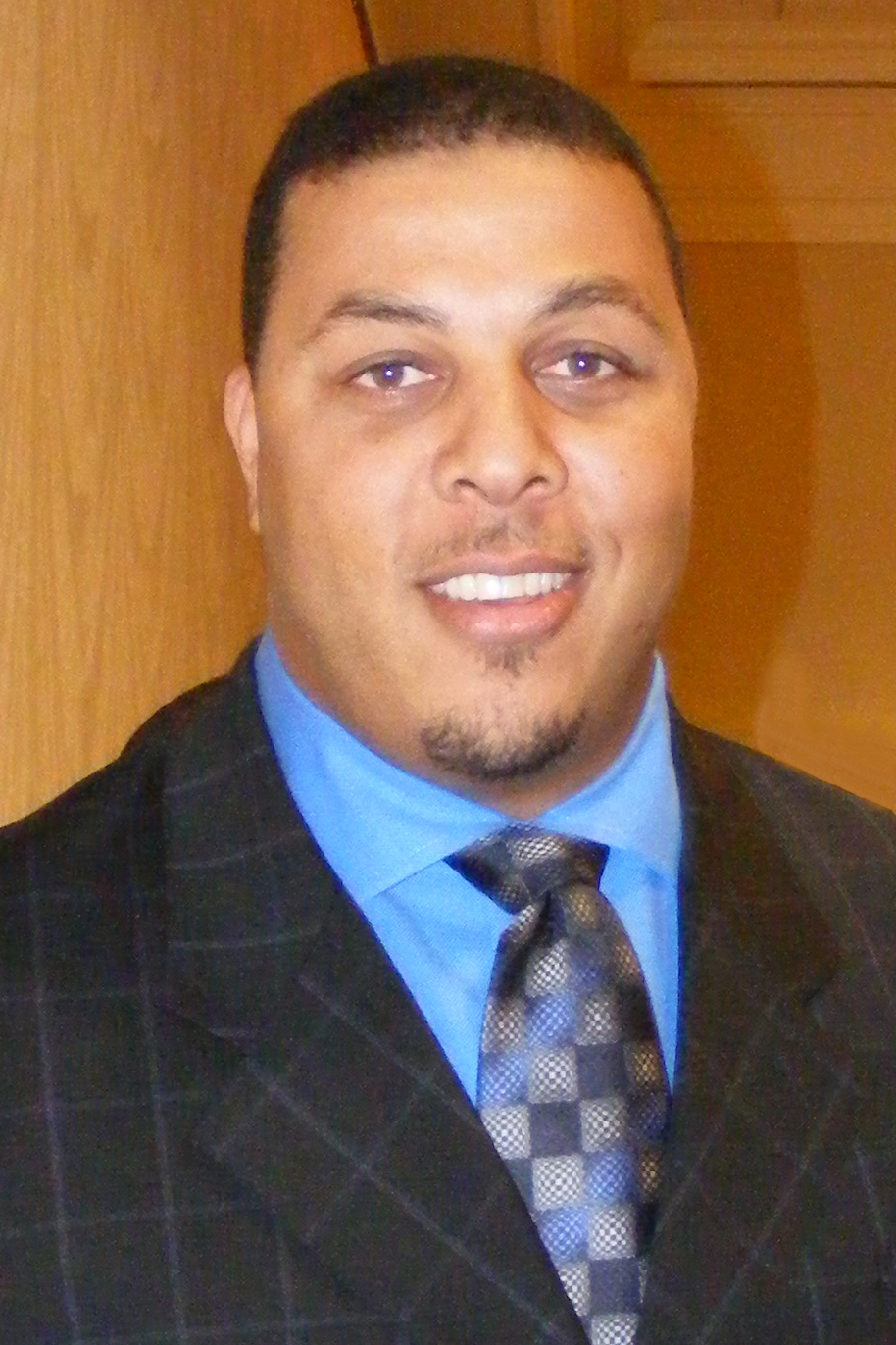

Member of the Maryland House of Delegates from the 26th district
- In office January 10, 2007 – January 11, 2023 Serving with Veronica L. Turner, Kris Valderrama
- Preceded by: Darryl A. Kelley
- Succeeded by: Jamila Woods

Personal details
- Born: Jewel Jacobia Walker; January 24, 1972 (age 54) Los Angeles, California, U.S.
- Party: Democratic
- Spouse: Monique Anderson-Walker
- Children: 3
- Education: Howard University (BA)
- Football career

No. 6
- Position: Quarterback

Personal information
- Listed height: 6 ft 3 in (1.91 m)
- Listed weight: 229 lb (104 kg)

Career information
- High school: University (Los Angeles, California)
- College: Long Beach State (1991); Howard (1992–1993)
- NFL draft: 1994: 7th round, 198th overall pick

Career history
- New England Patriots (1994); Barcelona Dragons (1995); Minnesota Vikings (1996–1997); Winnipeg Blue Bombers (1998)
- Stats at Pro Football Reference

Jewel Jacobia Walker (born January 24, 1972) is an American sports announcer, former businessman, politician, and professional football player who served as a member of the Maryland House of Delegates for the 26th district. He played as a quarterback in the National Football League (NFL). Walker was formerly CEO and president of Walker Financial Services and now works as a college football analyst for ESPN.

== Early life and education ==
Born in California, Walker attended University High School in Los Angeles and earned a Bachelor of Arts degree in political science from Howard University.

== Career ==
=== Football ===
Walker played quarterback in both college and professional football, after a brief stint in professional baseball. After high school, he was drafted by Major League Baseball's California Angels organization. He spent one year as a pitcher in the minor leagues before deciding to pursue college football. He initially attended Long Beach State but transferred when football was eliminated as a sport at the school.

Walker later joined the Howard Bison, where he set single-season records for pass completions and passing yardage, as well as a single-game record for pass completions (with 38). His passing earned him the nickname "Sky Walker." He was selected to the All-MEAC (Mid-Eastern Athletic Conference) teams in both 1993 and 1994, and named Offensive Player of the Year in 1994. That season, the Bison recorded an undefeated regular season while winning the MEAC championship and a claim to the black college football national championship; the team also secured the school's first NCAA Division I-AA playoff bid and a top-ten national ranking. In 2005, Walker was voted into the Howard University Athletics Hall of Fame.

Walker pursued a professional career in the National Football League when he was selected in the seventh round of the 1994 NFL draft by the New England Patriots to join the quarterback room of Drew Bledsoe and Scott Zolak. Walker spent the 1995 season in the World League of American Football with the Barcelona Dragons, where he suffered an injury during a game in which a lack of running backs required him to throw a pass on every play. Following the injury, he lost his job with New England, but he returned to the NFL with the Minnesota Vikings, where he served as a backup for two years. He played in a single game, attempting two career NFL passes, both for completions.

=== Maryland Legislature ===
Walker was a member of the Maryland House of Delegates from January 10, 2007, to January 11, 2023. He served on the House Ways and Means Committee. He was also a member of the Legislative Black Caucus of Maryland.

Walker sponsored House Bill 30 in 2007, establishing the Maryland Educational Fund.

In March 2022, Walker announced that he would not seek re-election to any office in 2022.

== Personal life ==
Walker is married to Monique Anderson-Walker, a former politician and candidate for lieutenant governor of Maryland in 2022. He lives in Fort Washington, Maryland, and has three children.
