= Christine M. Jones =

American politician (1929–2013)

Christine Miller Jones

Member of the Maryland House of Delegates from Prince George’s County
- In office 1982–1994

Personal details
- Born: December 25, 1929 Navasota, Texas
- Died: January 26, 2013 (aged 83) Baltimore, Maryland
- Party: Democratic
- Spouse: Robert E. Jones
- Occupation: Teacher

Christine M. Jones (December 25, 1929 – January 26, 2013) was an American politician who represented District 26 in the Maryland House of Delegates.

== Early life ==
Jones was born in Navasota, Texas, on Christmas Day in 1929. She attended Huston-Tillotson College where she received a B.A. in 1949.

== Career ==
=== Education ===
Jones was an educator and teacher in the Prince George's County school system for over 20 years. She was a member of the Prince George's County Education Association and the Maryland State Teachers Association. Jones was also a National Education Association member.

=== Politics ===
Jones was a member of the House of Delegates (Prince George's County) from 1982 to 1994. She was the assistant majority floor leader in 1994 and a member of the Economic Matters Committee during her entire tenure. She also served on that committee's Worker's Compensation Subcommittee and the Joint Committee on Administrative, Executive, and Legislative Review, the Joint Committee on Federal Relations, and the Joint Committee on Protocol. Jones chaired the Legislative Black Caucus of Maryland from 1991 to 1992.

She was a founder and honorary member of the Prince George's Coalition on Black Affairs.

== Personal life ==
She was a member of the Oxon Hill Democratic Club, the John Hanson Women's Club, the Southern Prince George's Business and Professional Women's Club, and the Phi Delta Kappa chapter of the Delta Sigma Theta sorority. She served on the board of the National Conference of Christians and Jews, the Prince George's Mental Health Association, the Southern Christian Leadership Conference, and the Center for Community Development. She was a member of the Bethlehem Baptist Church Women's Club.

Jones died on January 26, 2013, a week after being rescued from a house fire.
