= Thomas B. Cumiskey =

American politician (1916–2002)

Thomas B. Cumiskey Jr.

Member of the Maryland House of Delegates from the 1B district
- In office 1975–1982 Serving with William B. Byrnes
- Preceded by: District established
- Succeeded by: New district

Personal details
- Born: November 7, 1916 Cumberland, Maryland, U.S.
- Died: September 15, 2002 (aged 85) Cumberland, Maryland, U.S.
- Party: Democratic
- Spouse: Helen A. Stakem (m. 1939; died 2001)
- Children: 5
- Occupation: Politician; postal worker

Thomas B. Cumiskey Jr. (November 7, 1916 – September 15, 2002) was an American politician from Maryland. He served as a member of the Maryland House of Delegates from 1975 to 1982.

== Early life ==
Thomas B. Cumiskey Jr. was born on November 7, 1916, in Cumberland, Maryland, to Thomas B. Cumiskey. He attended parochial schools in Cumberland. He attended St. Patrick's School and graduated from LaSalle High School in Cumberland in 1936.

== Career ==
Cumiskey joined the postal service in Cumberland in 1936. He was an inspector his first four years. He later served as assistant postmaster of Cumberland. He remained until his resignation on November 30, 1971. He left following President Richard Nixon's administration's reorganization efforts. He served in the U.S. Army Reserve from 1949 to 1969 and attained the rank of major. He was a member of the Cumberland Civil Service Commission from 1973 to 1974.

Cumiskey was a Democrat. He served as a member of the Maryland House of Delegates, representing part of Allegany County in District 1B, from 1975 to 1982. He did not seek re-election in 1982. He was a member of the Democratic State Central Committee of Allegany County from 1985 to 1976.

Cumiskey served as vice chair of the Allegany County chapter of the American Red Cross and was a member of the National Association of Retired Federal Employees, Maryland Commission on Intergovernmental Cooperation, the Rural Development Committee, State-Federal Assembly, and NCSL. He was chair of the Maryland Legislative Study Group.

== Personal life ==
Cumiskey married Helen A. Stakem, daughter of Thomas C. Stakem, on September 9, 1939. They had five children, Katherine, Thomas B., James, Michael P. and Alice. His wife died in 2001. He lived on Schley Street in Cumberland. He was a parishioner and member of the choir of the Saints Peter and Paul Roman Catholic Church in Cumberland. He was also a member of Catholic War Veterans and the Knights of Columbus.

Cumiskey died from a head injury on September 15, 2002, at Cumberland Hospital in Cumberland.
