= 1962 Maryland Attorney General election =

- November 6, 1962

Nominee	Thomas B. Finan	Martin A. Ferris, III
Party	Democratic	Republican
Popular vote	422,135	257,515
Percentage	62.11%	37.89%
- County results Finan: 50–60% 60–70% 70–80% Ferris: 50–60%
Attorney General before election
C. Ferdinand Sybert
Democratic
Elected Attorney General
Thomas B. Finan
Democratic

The 1962 Maryland attorney general election was held on November 6, 1962, in order to elect the attorney general of Maryland. Democratic nominee and incumbent Secretary of State of Maryland Thomas B. Finan defeated Republican nominee Martin A. Ferris, III.

== General election ==
On election day, November 6, 1962, Democratic nominee Thomas B. Finan won the election by a margin of 164,620 votes against his opponent Republican nominee Martin A. Ferris, III, thereby retaining Democratic control over the office of attorney general. Finan was sworn in as the 38th attorney general of Maryland on January 3, 1963.

=== Results ===
Maryland Attorney General election, 1962
Party	Candidate	Votes	%
Democratic	Thomas B. Finan	422,135	62.11
Republican	Martin A. Ferris, III	257,515	37.89
Total votes		679,650	100.00
Democratic hold			
