= Car lashes =

Automobile headlight accessory

Car lashes on a Volkswagen Beetle

Front view of car lashes on a Mini Hatch

Car lashes are an automobile accessory where false eyelashes are put above the headlights of a car. They were created in 2010 in the United States, and shortly thereafter became very popular, despite being disliked by many drivers and accusations of tackiness.

== History and use ==
The first company to sell car lashes was CarLashes, created by Dottie and Robert Small of Park City, Utah, in 2010 through the firm Turbo Style Products. They are made of plastic and attached with 3M automotive grade double-sided tape. and can be paired with optional "crystal eyeliner", a strip of rhinestones attached above the lashes. The company sells both black and pink lashes, among other colors, with various types of tips. CarLashes is the most popular vendor, but other retailers also sell car lashes.

The accessory became popular in the early 2010s, beginning in the United States and moving on to the United Kingdom. They are usually fitted on to "cute" cars like VW Beetles and Fiat 500s, but can be applied to almost any type of car and some other motorized vehicles.

== Reception ==
Car lashes are designed to make the car appear more feminine. The Irish Examiner's Deirdre Reynolds said the lashes were "just the latest accessory on the market to encourage women to makeover their motor." The Daily Telegraph described them as "the new 'must-have' kitsch car accessory for female motorists in the US and Britain" in 2010.

Car lashes have been called pointless, embarrassing, kitsch, and ridiculous, but nonetheless very popular. Various surveys have found that car lashes are the most hated car modification, with between 32 and 78 percent of drivers disliking them. Co-inventor Robert Small called car lashes "polarizing"; Dottie called them an "emotional product". In 2013, they said their company had sold $3 million worth of CarLashes in 92 countries. Despite concerns from some motorists, there is no evidence they are distracting on the road, and are not illegal.

Glamour writer Petra Guglielmetti called car lashes a "natural progression" from other car accessories like reindeer antlers during the winter holidays. They have also been compared to "Carstaches", fuzzy mustaches put on the front of cars, which came onto the market around the same time.

== See also ==
- Truck nuts
- Fuzzy dice
