= 1954 Maryland Attorney General election =

- November 2, 1954

Nominee	C. Ferdinand Sybert	Edward D. E. Rollins
Party	Democratic	Republican
Popular vote	330,413	289,974
Percentage	53.26%	46.74%
- County results Sybert: 50–60% 60–70% Rollins: 50–60% 60–70%
Attorney General before election
Edward D. E. Rollins (Acting)
Republican
Elected Attorney General
C. Ferdinand Sybert
Democratic

The 1954 Maryland attorney general election was held on November 2, 1954, in order to elect the attorney general of Maryland. Democratic nominee and former Speaker of the Maryland House of Delegates C. Ferdinand Sybert defeated Republican nominee and incumbent acting attorney general Edward D. E. Rollins.

== General election ==
On election day, November 2, 1954, Democratic nominee C. Ferdinand Sybert won the election by a margin of 40,439 votes against his opponent Republican nominee Edward D. E. Rollins, thereby gaining Democratic control over the office of attorney general. Syberd was sworn in as the 37th attorney general of Maryland on January 3, 1955.

=== Results ===
Maryland Attorney General election, 1954
Party	Candidate	Votes	%
Democratic	C. Ferdinand Sybert	330,413	53.26
Republican	Edward D. E. Rollins (incumbent)	289,974	46.74
Total votes		620,387	100.00
Democratic gain from Republican			
