= Terry Baker (politician) =

American politician (born 1955)

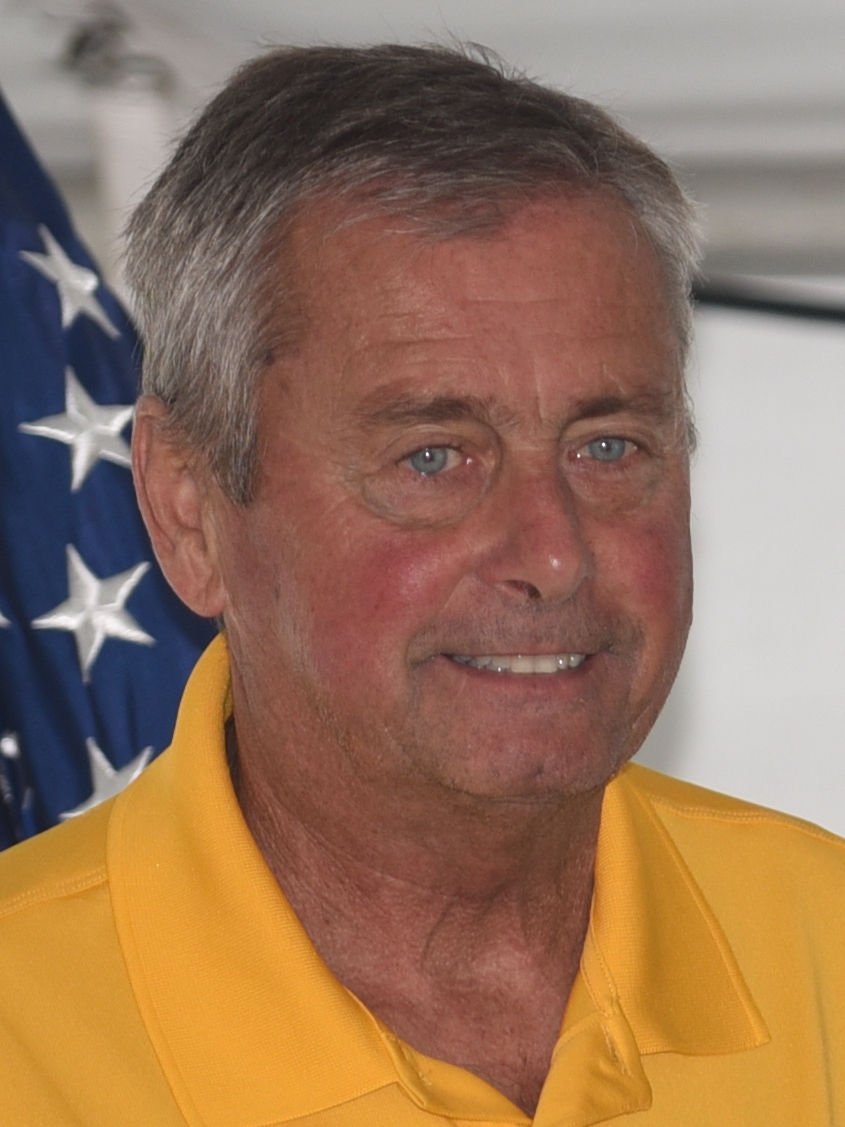

Member of the Maryland House of Delegates from the 1C district
- Incumbent
- Assumed office January 11, 2023
- Preceded by: Mike McKay

Vice President of the Washington County Board of Commissioners
- In office December 4, 2018 – December 6, 2022
- Preceded by: Jeffrey A. Cline
- Succeeded by: Jeffrey A. Cline
- In office December 5, 2006 – December 7, 2010
- Succeeded by: John F. Barr

President of the Washington County Board of Commissioners
- In office December 7, 2010 – December 4, 2018
- Preceded by: John F. Barr
- Succeeded by: Jeffrey A. Cline

Personal details
- Born: Terry Lee Baker; November 24, 1955 (age 70) Pinesburg, Maryland, U.S.
- Party: Republican
- Children: 2
- Education: Hagerstown Junior College (AA); Auburn University (BS)

Terry Lee Baker (born November 24, 1955) is an American politician. He is a member of the Maryland House of Delegates for District 1C in Allegany and Washington counties. He was previously the vice president of the Washington County Board of Commissioners from 2006 to 2010 and from 2018 to 2022, and the board's president from 2010 to 2018.

== Career ==
Baker was born on November 24, 1955. He grew up in Pinesburg, Maryland, and graduated from Williamsport High School. He attended Hagerstown Junior College, where he earned an A.A. degree in 1975, and Auburn University, where he earned a B.S. degree in education in 1978.

After graduating, he worked as a carpentry coordinator at Washington County Technical High School. Baker also coached cross country running and track and field at a local high school until he was elected county commissioner in 2006. He retired from Washington County Public Schools in July 2015. Baker continues to operate his own home improvements contracting business.

Baker entered politics in 2002, when he became a member of the Clear Spring town council. In 2004, he became the town's assistant mayor. Since 2006, he has worked in various county government offices, including in the Board of Health, Economic Development Commission, and Social Services Board.

On December 6, 2010, Baker was sworn in as the vice president of the Washington County Board of Commissioners, later serving as the board's president from 2010 to 2018 and becoming the vice president after the end of his presidency.

On July 14, 2021, Baker filed to run for the Maryland House of Delegates in District 1C, seeking to succeed Delegate Mike McKay, who had previously announced that he would run for the Maryland Senate in 2022. He won the Republican primary on July 19, 2022, and later defeated Democratic challenger Carrie R. Hinton and Green Party challenger Charlotte McBraerty in the general election on November 8.

== 2016 House of Representatives campaign ==
On July 12, 2015, Baker announced that he would run for the United States House of Representatives in Maryland's 6th congressional district, challenging incumbent John Delaney. Baker finished second to Amie Hoeber, a former United States Secretary of the Army deputy under President Ronald Reagan, in the Republican primary election, receiving 23.1 percent of the vote.

== In the legislature ==
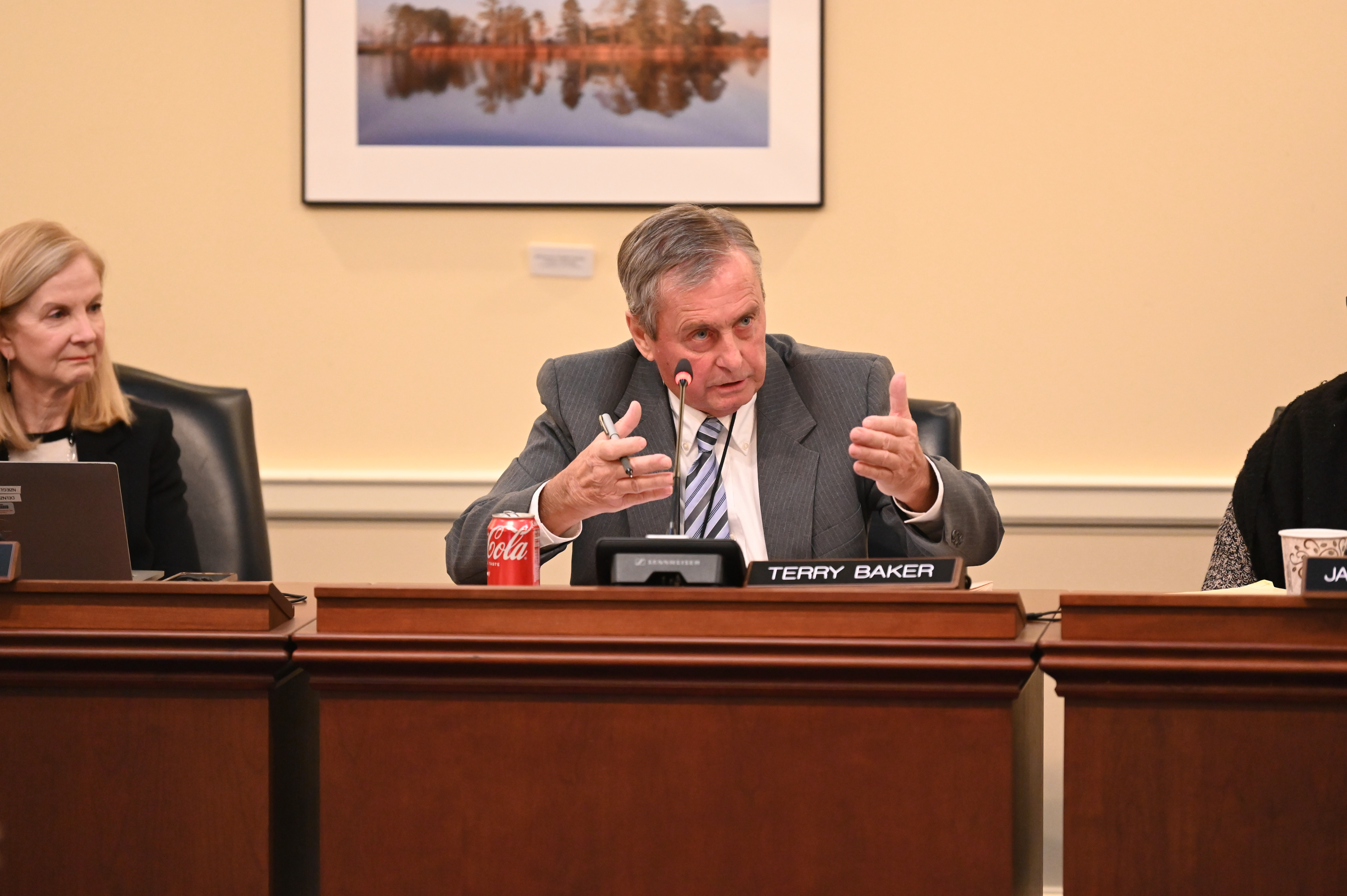
Baker in the House Environment and Transportation Committee, 2024

Baker was sworn into the Maryland House of Delegates on January 11, 2023. He is a member of the House Environment and Transportation Committee.

== Political positions ==
=== Education ===
Baker opposed the Common Core State Standards, saying that they "should be a decision made by parents and teachers, if they want it in their schools or not."

=== Energy ===
In March 2018, Baker expressed concerns over a pipeline project proposed by Columbia Gas Transmission that would stretch from southern Pennsylvania through Maryland to another planned pipeline in West Virginia.

=== Foreign policy ===
In September 2015, Baker said he opposed the Iran nuclear deal.

=== Immigration ===
During the 2026 legislative session, Baker voted against a bill to prohibit counties from entering into 287(g) program agreements with U.S. Immigration and Customs Enforcement.

=== Social issues ===
Baker self-identifies as pro-life. During the 2023 legislative session, he opposed a bill creating a 2024 referendum to codify Roe v. Wade into the Constitution of Maryland.

=== Taxes ===
In June 2019, Baker voted against increasing Washington County's income tax rate from 2.8 percent to 3.2 percent so the county could receive a larger disparity grant, expressing concerns that the grants were not guaranteed in the long run. In April 2021, Baker voted in favor of lowering the tax rate back to 2.8 percent.

== Personal life ==
Baker is married and has two children and three grandchildren. He owns two homes, including one in Clear Spring, Maryland, and another in Frost, West Virginia.

Baker is an accomplished distance runner, placing seventh at the 1982 Boston Marathon.

On July 25, 2018, Baker's wife, Katrina, filed for a temporary protective order against him, accusing him of "slapping, shoving, stalking and verbally abusing her over two separate incidents at the couple's homes" in July. She was granted a temporary protective order, but she withdrew her petition on July 26 after she and her husband negotiated a separation agreement.

== Electoral history ==
Washington County Board of Commissioners Republican primary election, 2006
Party	Candidate	Votes	%
Republican	John F. Barr	6,325	15.9
Republican	William J. Wivell	5,256	13.2
Republican	Terry L. Baker	4,595	11.6
Republican	James F. Kercheval	4,397	11.1
Republican	John C. Munson	3,837	9.7
Republican	Doris J. Nipps	3,452	8.7
Republican	W. Edward Forrest	3,112	7.8
Republican	J. Wallace McClure	2,506	6.3
Republican	Jeffrey L. Hewett	2,266	5.7
Republican	Edward L. Knepper	1,846	4.7
Republican	Carrie S. Gouff	1,228	3.1
Republican	Nathan A. Green	906	2.3

Washington County Board of Commissioners election, 2006
Party	Candidate	Votes	%
Republican	John F. Barr	23,041	12.8
Republican	Terry Baker	20,714	11.5
Republican	William J. Wivell	20,105	11.2
Republican	James F. Kercheval	19,419	10.8
Republican	Kristin B. Aleshire	18,557	10.3
Democratic	Donna L. Brightman	16,717	9.3
Democratic	Paul L. Swartz	16,239	9.0
Republican	John Munson	16,195	9.0
Democratic	N. Linn Hendershot	14,610	8.1
Democratic	J. Herbert Hardin	14,474	8.0
Write-in		179	0.1

Washington County Board of Commissioners election, 2010
Party	Candidate	Votes	%
Republican	Terry Baker	25,360	16.7
Republican	John F. Barr	25,025	16.4
Republican	Jeff Cline	24,352	16.0
Republican	Bill McKinley	23,365	15.4
Republican	Ruth Anne Callaham	22,538	14.8
Democratic	Kristin B. Aleshire	20,938	13.8
Green	Joe Lane	10,262	6.7
Write-in		332	0.2

Washington County Board of Commissioners election, 2014
Party	Candidate	Votes	%
Republican	Terry Baker	26,515	16.5
Republican	Jeff Cline	24,319	15.1
Republican	John F. Barr	24,119	15.0
Republican	LeRoy E. Myers Jr.	22,655	14.1
Republican	William J. Wivell	22,280	13.8
Democratic	Ronald L Bowers	13,363	8.3
Democratic	Brian Beall	10,589	6.6
Democratic	Paul F. Miller	9,039	5.6
Democratic	Millard H. Miller, Jr.	7,769	4.8
Write-in		264	0.2

Maryland's 6th congressional district election, 2016
Party	Candidate	Votes	%
Republican	Amie Hoeber	17,967	29.3
Republican	Terry L. Baker	13,837	22.6
Republican	Frank Howard	10,677	17.4
Republican	Robin Ficker	7,014	11.4
Republican	David E. Vogt III	5,774	9.4
Republican	Christopher James Mason	2,590	4.2
Republican	Scott Cheng	2,303	3.8
Republican	Harold Painter	1,117	1.8

Washington County Board of Commissioners election, 2018
Party	Candidate	Votes	%
Republican	Jeff Cline	28,106	13.1
Republican	Terry L. Baker	25,031	11.7
Republican	Randall Wagner	24,945	11.7
Republican	Wayne K. Keefer	24,105	11.3
Republican	Cort Meinelschmidt	23,459	11.0
Democratic	Donna L. Brightman	18,299	8.5
Democratic	Elizabeth Paul	18,234	8.5
Democratic	Ed Forrest	16,044	7.5
Democratic	Brian Beall	14,685	6.9
Independent	John Franklin Barr	10,819	5.1
Independent	Bill McKinley	10,064	4.7
Write-in		320	0.1

Maryland House of Delegates District 1C Republican primary election, 2022
Party	Candidate	Votes	%
Republican	Terry L. Baker	4,078	100.0

Maryland House of Delegates District 1C election, 2022
Party	Candidate	Votes	%
Republican	Terry L. Baker	11,336	75.95
Democratic	Carrie R. Hinton	3,287	22.02
Green	Charlotte McBrearty	297	1.99
Write-in		6	0.04
