= Kevin Kelly (politician) =

American politician (born 1953)

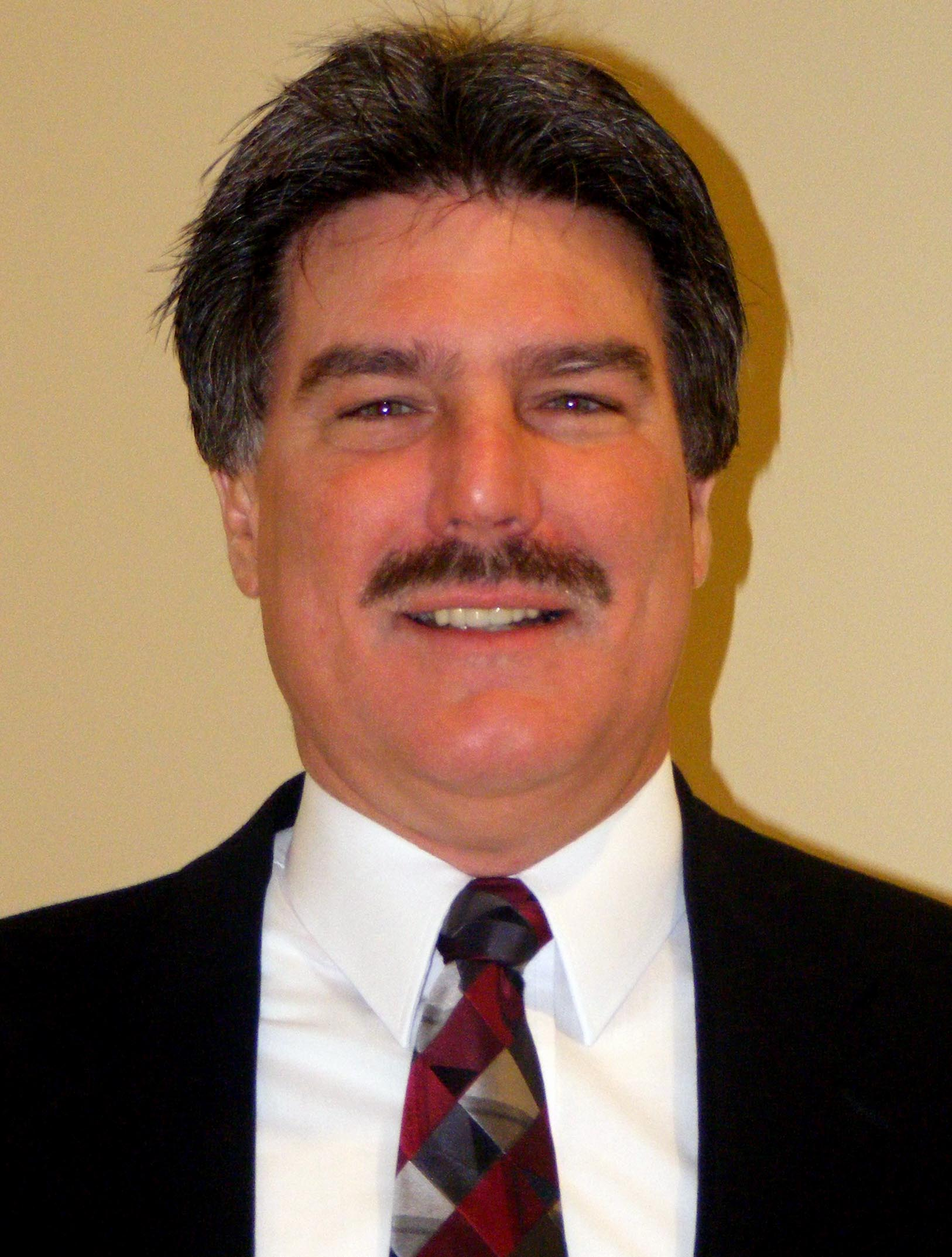
- Kelly in 2007

Member of the Maryland House of Delegates from the 1B district
- In office January 13, 1999 – January 14, 2015
- Preceded by: Betty Workman (D)
- Succeeded by: Jason C. Buckel (R)

Member of the Maryland House of Delegates from the 1B district
- In office January 1987 – January 1995 Serving with Betty Workman (D)
- Preceded by: William B. Byrnes (D); W. Timothy Finan (D)
- Succeeded by: (redistricted)

Personal details
- Born: August 18, 1953 (age 72) Cumberland, Maryland, U.S.
- Party: Democratic
- Education: Bishop Walsh School, Cumberland, Maryland
- Alma mater: Frostburg State College (B.S.); University of Baltimore School of Law (J.D.)
- Profession: Attorney

Kevin Kelly (born August 18, 1953) is an American politician from Maryland and a member of the Democratic Party. He served in the Maryland House of Delegates, representing District 1B in Allegany County for six terms, from 1987 until 1995, and again from 1999 until 2015. Kelly was a member of the Judiciary Committee and its Civil Law and Procedure Subcommittee.

== Background ==
Kelly was born in Cumberland, Maryland on August 18, 1953. He graduated from Bishop Walsh School in 1971. After high school he attended Frostburg State University where he got his B.S. in Political Science. After Frostburg he attended the University of Baltimore School of Law where he attained his J.D. in 1978. Kelly was admitted to the Maryland bar in 1980.

== Education ==
Kevin Kelly received his education from the following institutions:

- JD, University of Baltimore School of Law, 1978
- BS, Political Science, Frostburg State College, 1975

== Political experience ==
Kevin Kelly has had the following political experience:

- Delegate, Maryland State House of Delegates, 1999–2015
- Delegate, Maryland State House of Delegates, 1987–1995

== In the legislature ==
Kelly was first elected to the General Assembly in 1986, serving through 1994, and was re-elected in 1998. Kelly was defeated in the 2014 Maryland general election after serving 20 years in the Maryland House of Delegates.

=== Legislative committees ===
Kevin Kelly served on the following committees:

- Judiciary Committee, 1987–1995, 1999–2015
  - Subcommittee on Civil Law and Procedure, 1999–2015
- Joint Committee on Administrative, Executive and Legislative Review, 1993–1995
  - Administrative, Executive, and Legislative Review Subcommittee

== Election ==
=== 2014 general election ===
Voters to choose one:

Name	Votes	Percent	Outcome
Kevin Kelly, Dem.	4,623	40.9%	Lost
Jason C. Buckel, Rep.	6,664	58.9%	Won

=== 2010 general election ===
Voters to choose one:

Name	Votes	Percent	Outcome
Kevin Kelly, Dem.	6,226	51.26%	Won
Mary Beth Pirolozzi, Rep	5,908	48.64%	Lost

=== 2006 general election ===
Voters to choose one:

Name	Votes	Percent	Outcome
Kevin Kelly, Dem.	6,489	55.7%	Won
Mark A. Fisher, Rep.	5,151	44.2%	Lost

=== 2002 general election ===
Voters to choose one:

Name	Votes	Percent	Outcome
Kevin Kelly, Dem.	6,654	55.7%	Won
Tricia Wolfe, Rep.	5,286	44.3%	Lost
Other	4	0.0%	Lost

=== 1998 general election ===
Voters to choose one:

Name	Votes	Percent	Outcome
Kevin Kelly, Dem.	5,232	51%	Won
Tricia Wolfe, Rep.	4,991	49%	Lost

=== 1990 general election ===
Voters to choose two:

Name	Votes	Percent	Outcome
Kevin Kelly, Dem.	11,579	41%	Won
Betty Workman, Dem.	11,413	40%	Won
Dolores Chase Morgan, Rep.	5,321	19%	Lost

=== 1986 general election ===
Voters to choose two:

Name	Votes	Percent	Outcome
Betty Workman, Dem.	8,195	29%	Won
Kevin Kelly, Dem.	7,858	28%	Won
Robert M. Hutcheson, Rep.	6,151	22%	Lost
William R. Davis, Rep.	5,984	21%	Lost
