= 1958 Maryland Attorney General election =

- November 4, 1958

Nominee	C. Ferdinand Sybert	Robert A. Wallace
Party	Democratic	Republican
Popular vote	457,761	232,321
Percentage	66.33%	33.67%
- County results Sybert: 50–60% 60–70% 70–80% Wallace: 50–60%
Attorney General before election
C. Ferdinand Sybert
Democratic
Elected Attorney General
C. Ferdinand Sybert
Democratic

The 1958 Maryland attorney general election was held on November 4, 1958, in order to elect the attorney general of Maryland. Democratic nominee and incumbent attorney general C. Ferdinand Sybert defeated Republican nominee Robert A. Wallace.

== General election ==
On election day, November 4, 1958, Democratic nominee C. Ferdinand Sybert won re-election by a margin of 225,440 votes against his opponent Republican nominee Robert A. Wallace, thereby retaining Democratic control over the office of attorney general. Syberd was sworn in for his second term on January 3, 1959.

=== Results ===
Maryland Attorney General election, 1958
Party	Candidate	Votes	%
Democratic	C. Ferdinand Sybert (incumbent)	457,761	66.33
Republican	Robert A. Wallace	232,321	33.67
Total votes		690,082	100.00
Democratic hold			
