= Idaho House Bill 270 =

2025 Idaho indecent exposure law

Idaho Legislature
- Long title: AN ACT RELATING TO INDECENT EXPOSURE; AMENDING SECTION 18-4116, IDAHO CODE, TO REVISE PROVISIONS REGARDING INDECENT EXPOSURE; AND DECLARING AN EMERGENCY.
- Territorial extent: Idaho
- Enacted by: Idaho House of Representatives
- Enacted by: Idaho Senate
- Signed by: Brad Little
- Signed: March 26, 2025
- Effective: March 26, 2025

Legislative history

Initiating chamber: Idaho House of Representatives
- Introduced by: Jeff Cornilles
- Introduced: February 18, 2025
- First reading: February 18, 2025
- Second reading: February 27, 2025
- Third reading: February 28, 2025
- Voting summary: 59 voted for; 8 voted against; 3 absent

Revising chamber: Idaho Senate
- Received from the Idaho House of Representatives: March 3, 2025
- First reading: March 3, 2025
- Second reading: March 19, 2025
- Third reading: March 24, 2025
- Voting summary: 28 voted for; 6 voted against; 1 absent

Summary
- Modifies Idaho's indecent exposure laws to consider toplessness a misdemeanor, as well as genitalia-related objects on public display.
- Status: In force

Idaho House Bill 270 (HB 270) is a 2025 law in the state of Idaho that revises the state's indecent exposure law. It was signed into law by Governor Brad Little on March 26, 2025 and entered into legal force immediately through an emergency clause.

House Bill 270 has been criticized as being anti-transgender. According to the author of HB 270, Jeff Cornilles, it was introduced in part due to the Canyon County Pride Festival in 2024.

== Provisions ==
House Bill 270 considers exposing breasts as a misdemeanor. It includes a provision affecting transgender women, stating that exposed breasts that have been hormonally or medically altered also count as a misdemeanor. It separately considers "truck nuts" or other genitalia-related products on public display as a misdemeanor as well. Anybody actively breastfeeding a baby, even in public, is exempt from the law. If somebody is charged with three misdemeanors under the law within 5 years of each other could be charged as a felony and sentenced to five years in prison.

== See also ==
- Indecent exposure in the United States
- LGBTQ rights in Idaho
