= Maryland House of Delegates District 1C =

American legislative district

Maryland's legislative district 1C
- Represents parts of Allegany County and Washington County
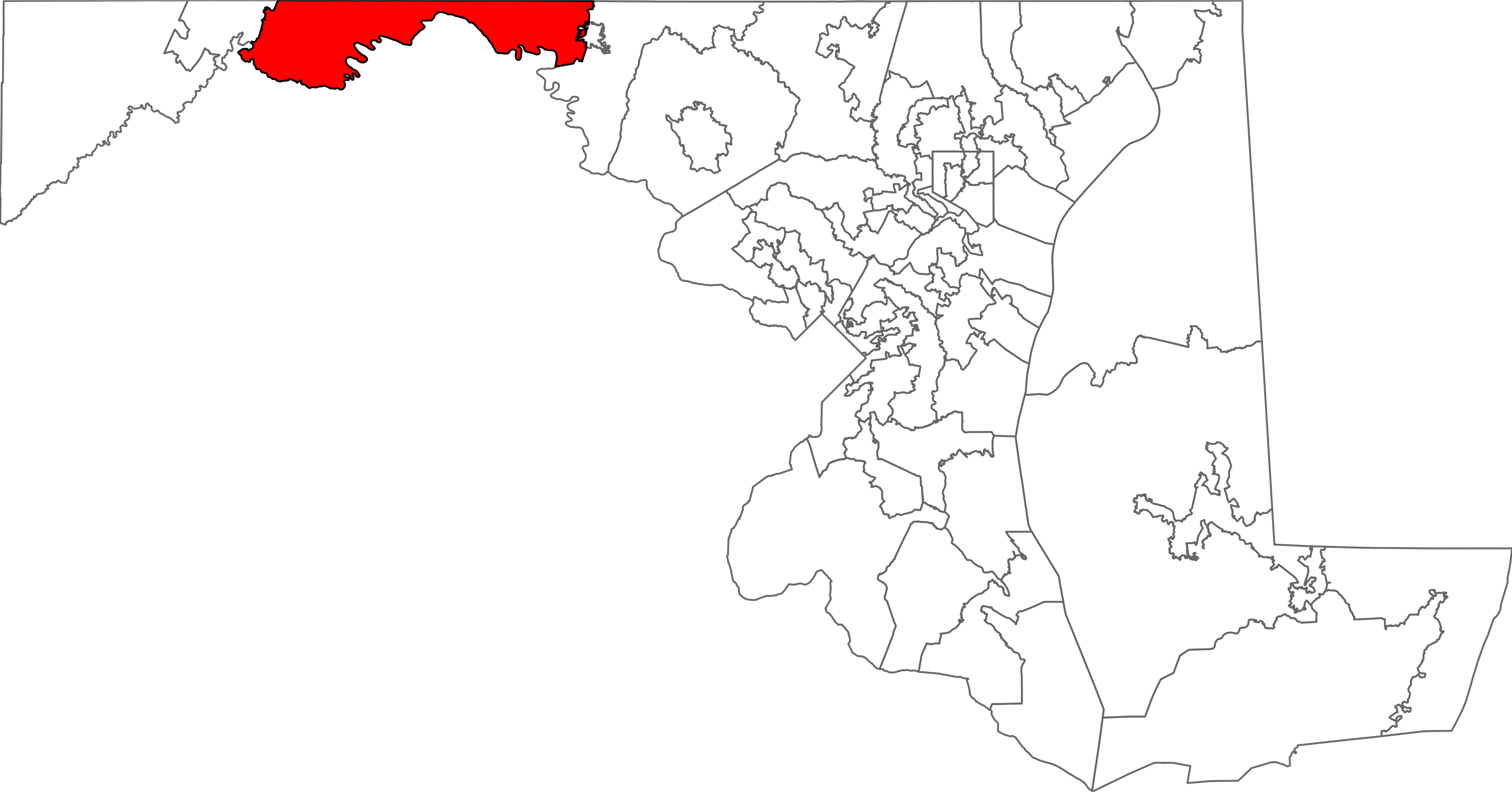
- Delegate(s): Terry Baker (R)
- Registration: 52.2% Republican; 27.5% Democratic; 18.6% unaffiliated
- Demographics: 87.3% White; 5.5% Black/African American; 0.2% Native American; 1.1% Asian; 0.0% Hawaiian/Pacific Islander; 0.8% Other race; 5.1% Two or more races; 2.3% Hispanic
- Population (2020): 39,382
- Voting-age population: 31,702
- Registered voters: 25,840

Maryland House of Delegates District 1C is one of the 71 districts that compose the Maryland House of Delegates. Along with subdistricts 1A and 1B, it makes up the 1st district of the Maryland Senate. Situated in Western Maryland, District 1C covers parts of Allegany County and Washington County. It is represented by one delegate. Since 2023, it has been represented by Terry Baker, a Republican.

District 1C was created in the 1994 election, splitting off from District 1B, which until then had elected 2 delegates.

== Demographic characteristics ==
As of the 2020 United States census, the district had a population of 39,382, of whom 31,702 (80.5%) were of voting age. The racial makeup of the district was 34,371 (87.3%) White, 2,157 (5.5%) African American, 92 (0.2%) Native American, 418 (1.1%) Asian, 3 (0.0%) Pacific Islander, 317 (0.8%) from some other race, and 2,010 (5.1%) from two or more races. Hispanic or Latino of any race were 914 (2.3%) of the population.

The district had 25,840 registered voters as of October 17, 2020, of whom 4,813 (18.6%) were registered as unaffiliated, 13,484 (52.2%) were registered as Republicans, 7,098 (27.5%) were registered as Democrats, and 238 (0.9%) were registered to other parties.

== Past Election Results ==
=== 1994 ===
Name	Party	Votes	Percent	Outcome
Casper R. Taylor Jr.	Democratic	5,928	100.0%	Won

=== 1998 ===
Name	Party	Votes	Percent	Outcome
Casper R. Taylor Jr.	Democratic	6,205	70.1%	Won
Eileen Brinker Steele	Republican	2,648	29.9%	Lost

=== 2002 ===
Name	Party	Votes	Percent	Outcome
LeRoy E. Myers Jr.	Republican	5,657	50.3%	Won
Casper R. Taylor Jr.	Democratic	5,581	49.6%	Lost
Other Write-Ins		8	0.1%	

=== 2006 ===
Name	Party	Votes	Percent	Outcome
LeRoy E. Myers Jr.	Republican	6,398	57.2%	Won
Brian K. Grim	Democratic	4,769	42.7%	Lost
Other Write-Ins		13	0.1%	

=== 2010 ===
Name	Party	Votes	Percent	Outcome
LeRoy E. Myers Jr.	Republican	7,554	69.7%	Won
Ronald Lohr	Democratic	3,267	30.1%	Lost
Other Write-Ins		22	0.2%	

=== 2014 ===
Name	Party	Votes	Percent	Outcome
Mike McKay	Republican	6,388	57.0%	Won
Nick Scarpelli	Democratic	4,809	42.9%	Lost
Other Write-Ins		9	0.1%	

=== 2018 ===
Name	Party	Votes	Percent	Outcome
Mike McKay	Republican	10,228	82.1%	Won
Daniel DelMonte	Green	2,177	17.5%	Lost
Other Write-Ins		54	0.4%	

=== 2022 ===
Two-term Republican incumbent Mike McKay announced on July 21, 2021, that he would run for state Senate instead of seeking a third term.

Republican primary results
Party	Candidate	Votes	%
Republican	Terry L. Baker	4,078	100.0

Democratic primary results
Party	Candidate	Votes	%
Democratic	Carrie R. Hinton	1,483	100.0

Results by precinct Baker: 50–60%; 60–70%; 70–80%; 80–90%; Hinton: 50–60%

2022 Maryland's 1C House of Delegates district election
Party	Candidate	Votes	%
Republican	Terry L. Baker	11,336	75.95%
Democratic	Carrie R. Hinton	3,287	22.02%
Green	Charlotte McBrearty	297	1.99%
Write-in		6	0.04%
Total votes		14,926	100.00%
Republican hold			

== List of delegates ==
Delegate	Party	Years	Electoral history
Casper R. Taylor Jr.	Democratic	January 1995 – January 8, 2003	Lost reelection in 2002.
LeRoy E. Myers Jr.	Republican	January 8, 2003 – January 2015	Retired December 1, 2014.
Mike McKay	Republican	January 2015 – present	Elected in 2014. Retired to successfully run for the Maryland Senate in 2022.
Terry Baker	Republican	January 11, 2023 – present	Elected in 2022.
