= Bishop Walsh School =

Location
- 700 Bishop Walsh Road; Cumberland, Maryland 21502; United States; 39°39′40″N 78°47′27″W

Information
- Type: Private, Coeducational
- Religious affiliation: Roman Catholic
- Established: 1966
- Oversight: Archdiocese of Baltimore
- President: Joe Carter
- Principal: Jennifer Flinn
- Grades: K–12
- Enrollment: 350 (2020)
- Average class size: 20
- Colors: Burgundy and White
- Mascot: Spartan
- Accreditation: Cognia
- Newspaper: Walsh Street Journal
- Yearbook: The Warrior
- Website: http://www.bishopwalsh.org

Bishop Walsh School is a K-12 Catholic school located in Cumberland, Maryland, and under the jurisdiction of the Archdiocese of Baltimore. Approximately 350 students attend.

== History ==
The school was founded by the Christian Brothers, a monastic order, and is named in honor of the Bishop James Walsh, a Cumberland-born missionary and member of the Maryknoll order, who preached in China and was imprisoned in solitary confinement by its Communist government for twelve years. When Walsh was finally released from prison in 1970 he was greeted by Pope Paul VI on August 25, 1970. He died at the age of ninety on July 29, 1981.

Opening in 1969, the school was originally Bishop Walsh High School (BW) and replaced four other Catholic high schools: La Salle, Ursuline Academy, Girls Central, and St. Peter's. In the mid-1980s, St. Mary's Elementary school closed and St. Patrick's and St. Peter & Paul reorganized as a grade school and middle school. Later, the grade school became St. John Neuman and BW became a middle/high school.

In the 2001–2002 school year, it combined with St. John Neumann Elementary School and St. Peter's Elementary School in Westernport, to form a K-12 school. (St. John Neumann school, located on the corner of Fayette and Smallwood streets, has since been torn down.) The school is run in part by the Catholic organization the School Sisters of Notre Dame. The Christian Brothers served the Cumberland, MD area for over 100 years until 2011 when the last of the remaining Brothers were reassigned from Bishop Walsh. The school's sports teams are called the Spartans after the warriors of ancient Sparta.

== Notable alumni ==
- Samuel Perlozzo - professional baseball player and MLB manager (Baltimore Orioles) (class of 1969)
- Kevin Kelly - (D) 1B, Maryland House of Delegates, (class of 1971)
- Jason C. Buckel - (R) 1B, Maryland House of Delegates

== Athletics ==
Bishop Walsh's athletic teams compete in the Appalachian Mountain Athletic Conference (AMAC) in all sports except football. They also compete against rivals Fort Hill High School and Allegany High School for Cumberland City championships in all sports except football.

In 2016, a former girls' soccer coach was granted probation in a sex offense case involving a 17-year-old player student at the school.

== See also ==
- National Catholic Educational Association
