= Mike McKay (politician) =

American politician (born 1969)

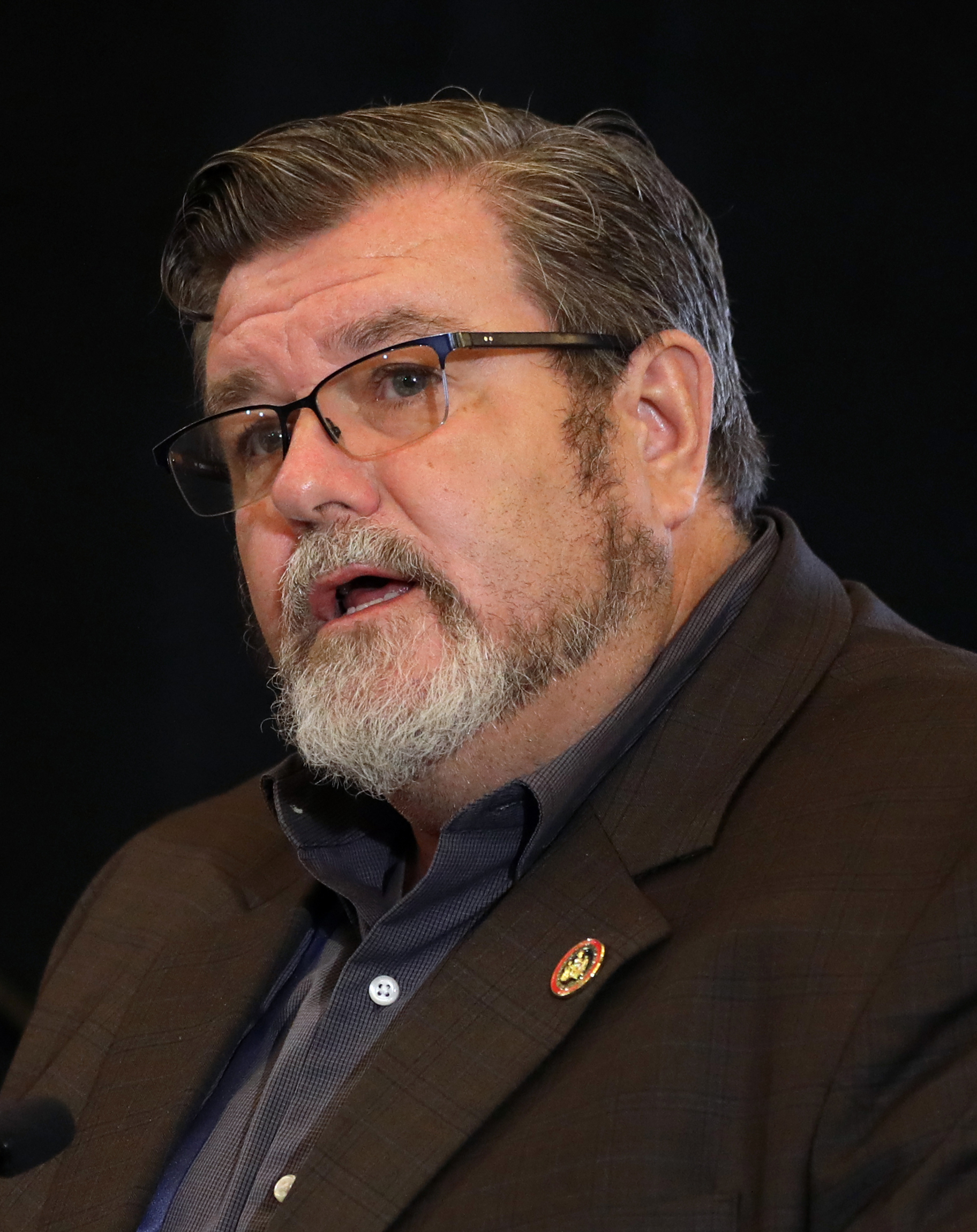

Member of the Maryland Senate from the 1st district
- Incumbent
- Assumed office January 11, 2023
- Preceded by: George C. Edwards

Member of the Maryland House of Delegates from the 1C district
- In office January 14, 2015 – January 11, 2023
- Preceded by: LeRoy E. Myers Jr.
- Succeeded by: Terry Baker

Personal details
- Born: Michael Wayne McKay; March 5, 1969 (age 57) Rockville, Maryland, U.S.
- Party: Republican
- Spouse: Kimberly
- Children: 8

Michael Wayne McKay (born March 5, 1969) is an American politician who has served as a Republican member of the Maryland Senate representing the 1st district, which covers parts of Garrett, Allegany, and Washington counties. He was previously the state delegate for District 1C from 2015 to 2023.

== Early life and career ==
McKay was born on March 5, 1969, in Rockville, Maryland. He manages a dry cleaning business, which has four locations in Maryland and West Virginia.

From 2010 to 2014, McKay served as president of the Allegany County Board of County Commissioners and the Cumberland Area Metropolitan Planning Organization. He also served as a member of the Allegany County Board of Education and various other county-level boards.

In June 2013, McKay announced his candidacy for the Maryland House of Delegates, seeking to succeed Delegate LeRoy Myers, who previously announced plans to retire. Following his candidacy announcement, Myers endorsed his bid for the delegate seat. He won the primary election with 56.2 percent of the vote, defeating Republican challenger Ray Givens. McKay's general election opponent, Nick Scarpelli, was financially backed by former state delegate Bruce Poole. He defeated Scarpelli in the general election, receiving 57 percent of the vote.

== In the legislature ==
McKay was sworn into the Maryland House of Delegates on January 14, 2015. He was a member of the Appropriations Committee during his entire tenure and served as the vice chair of the Washington County Delegation from 2019 to 2023.

In July 2017, McKay announced that he would not seek re-election in the 2018 elections, instead choosing to seek election as Allegany County Register of Wills. However, McKay was not selected to fill the position after Rebecca Drew, then-Register of Wills, resigned facing misuse of funds allegations, and later filed to run for re-election to the House of Delegates in October 2017.

In July 2021, McKay announced his candidacy for the Maryland Senate in 2022, seeking to succeed Senator George C. Edwards, who previously announced plans to retire. He defeated Democratic nominee Mike Dreisbach in the general election in November 2022, and was sworn in on January 11, 2023. McKay is a member of the Judicial Proceedings Committee from 2023 to 2027, afterwards serving on the Senate Education, Energy, and the Environment Committee.

In July 2025, The Daily Record reported that McKay was under investigation by the Joint Committee on Legislative Ethics and the Maryland State Board of Elections for selling books summarizing the 2024 and 2025 legislative sessions on Amazon, which raised questions as to whether he was making money by selling publicly accessible information. According to anonymous complaints, McKay used his senate staff members to compile information for the books and their availability on Amazon. In an interview, McKay said that he hasn't received any royalties from his books, which he pays for with campaign funding, and that the book were only purchased four times in the last two years, including by a legislative ethics employee looking into concerns with them. He also distributes the book for free to local officials in the areas he represents and will provide a free copy to anyone who asks, and questioned whether anonymous complaints about the books to state ethics officials were made by another lawmaker in the General Assembly because of envy over the idea or because of "people playing politics".

=== West Virginia annexation letter ===
In October 2021, he was one of five Maryland state legislators from Garrett, Allegany and Washington counties who sent a pair of letters to West Virginia officials asking about annexation of Western Maryland to West Virginia. McKay's primary challenger, Allegany County Commission President Jake Shade called the request a political stunt, an embarrassment and unneeded distraction. Following criticism from local officials and some constituents, Delegate Jason Buckel and State Senator George Edwards issued a letter withdrawing support for the secession proposal.

== Political positions ==
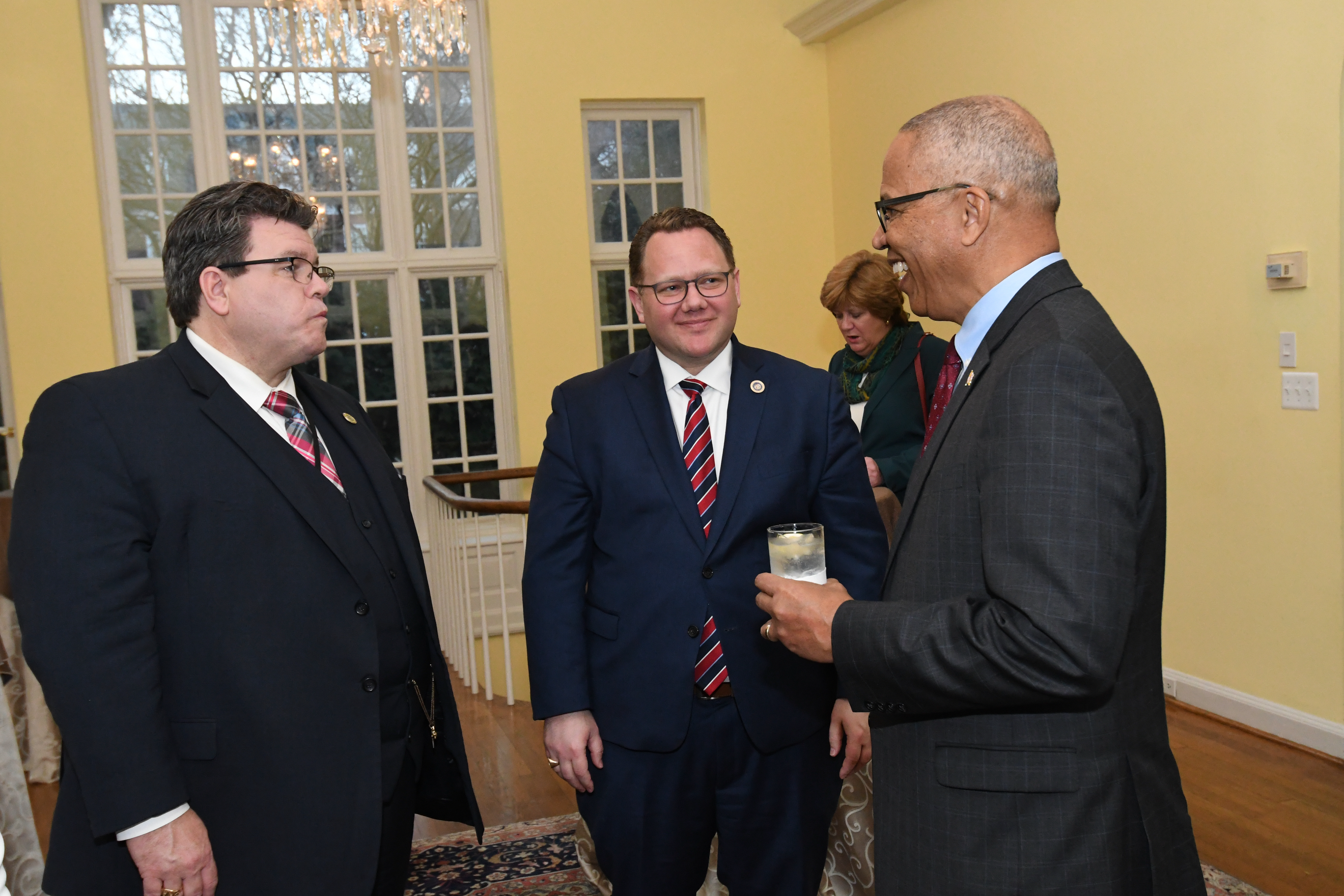
McKay with state delegate Nic Kipke and Maryland lieutenant governor Boyd Rutherford, 2020

=== Crime and policing ===
During the 2026 legislative session, McKay opposed a bill that would prohibit law enforcement officers from wearing face coverings, raising concerns with the penalties included in the bill for wearing a mask. He also voted for a bill to end the practice of automatically charging youth as adults for certain crimes in the Senate Judicial Proceedings Committee, but voted against the bill on the Senate floor, saying that he supported the committee amendments added to the bill but opposed changes to automatic charging. McKay also introduced legislation that would require police training for situations involving elopement.

=== Education ===
McKay supports limiting BOOST funding to schools that don't discriminate in admissions, but opposes the elimination of BOOST, saying that it would be "discrimination in itself" and that lawmakers need to have more tolerance for funding religious schools.

McKay introduced legislation during the 2016 legislative session that would bring an agricultural science curriculum to Maryland's public school systems.

=== Energy ===
During the 2015 legislative session, McKay opposed legislation that would impose a three-year moratorium on fracking. In 2025, he supported legislation to repeal Maryland's statewide fracking ban, citing rising energy prices in the state. Also in 2025, McKay introduced legislation that would strip protections from portions of three designated state wild lands (Big Savage Mountain Wildland, Bear Pen Wildland, and Dan's Mountain Wildland) in Garrett and Allegany Counties. In April 2026, McKay was one of four senators to vote against the Utility RELIEF Act, an omnibus energy bill backed by Governor Wes Moore and Democratic legislative leaders, later saying that he thought the bill didn't go far enough and was "really going to hurt people this summer".

In June 2026, McKay supported efforts by the second Trump administration to restart the Warrior Run Generating Station coal plant using federal funds.

=== Healthcare ===
McKay introduced legislation during the 2017 legislative session that would expand Medicaid to establish an adult dental option. During the 2018 legislative session, he introduced a bill that would establish a pilot program for adult Medicaid dental coverage. The bill passed and became law. During the 2019 legislative session, McKay introduced legislation that would establish the Adult Dental Pilot Program to provide basic dental insurance to certain individuals between the ages of 21 and 64 that are eligible for both Medicare and Medicaid. The bill passed and became law.

=== Immigration ===
During the 2026 legislative session, McKay opposed a bill to prohibit counties from entering into 287(g) program agreements with U.S. Immigration and Customs Enforcement, questioning whether it was possible for a state legislature to limit how other elected officials interact with federal agencies.

=== Minimum wage ===
McKay supports the requirement of prevailing wages in public construction contracts. He opposed legislation introduced in the 2019 legislative session that would raise the minimum wage to $15 an hour by 2025, saying that he was concerned about higher wages resulting in families making too much money to qualify for benefits like food stamps and subsidized housing.

=== Redistricting ===
In September 2021, McKay attended a meeting for the Legislative Redistricting Advisory Commission to encourage the commission to keep Frederick County whole in its redistricting map. He also encouraged the commission to decrease the size of the state's 1st legislative district. In February 2026, McKay said he opposed pursuing mid-decade redistricting in Maryland and opposed holding a vote on a bill that would redraw Maryland's congressional districts to improve the Democratic Party's chances of winning the 1st congressional district, the only congressional district held by Republicans in the state, saying that Maryland policy "should be dictated by Marylanders, not by a national political party".

=== Social issues ===
During the 2017 legislative session, McKay introduced a bill that would allow people to kill or wound black bears if one of the animals threatened a bee colony. The bill passed the House of Delegates by a vote of 124–17.

During the 2019 legislative session, McKay introduced a bill that would place term limits on members of Congress.

In April 2026, during debate on a bill that would designate Muslim American Heritage Month and Jewish American Heritage Month in Maryland, McKay introduced an amendment that would designate April as Christian American Heritage Month. The amendment was rejected in a 19–26 vote.

=== Taxes ===
McKay introduced legislation in the 2015 legislative session that would lower the corporate tax rate in Washington and Allegany counties from 8.25 percent to 4 percent.

== Personal life ==
McKay is married to his wife, Kimberly, who homeschools their older children during legislative sessions. Together, they have eight children. He attends the Cornerstone Baptist Church in Cumberland, Maryland.

== Electoral history ==
Allegany County Board of County Commissioners Republican primary election, 2010
Party	Candidate	Votes	%
Republican	Mike McKay	3,671	18.1
Republican	Creade Brodie Jr.	3,540	17.5
Republican	Bill Valentine	3,458	17.1
Republican	Mike Wade	3,227	15.9
Republican	Champ Zumbrun	2,226	11.0
Republican	Dale R. Lewis (incumbent)	1,908	9.4
Republican	Bob Hutcheson (incumbent)	1,614	8.0
Republican	Thomas D. McNemar, Jr.	597	2.9

Allegany County Board of County Commissioners election, 2010
Party	Candidate	Votes	%
Republican	Mike McKay	12,234	21.5
Republican	Creade Brodie Jr.	11,889	20.9
Republican	Bill Valentine	9,627	16.9
Democratic	Tom Striplin	9,578	16.8
Democratic	Bill DuVall	8,073	14.2
Democratic	Ed Hedrick	5,382	9.4
Write-in		207	0.3

Maryland House of Delegates District 1C Republican primary election, 2014
Party	Candidate	Votes	%
Republican	Mike McKay	1,568	56.2
Republican	Ray Givens	1,222	43.8

Maryland House of Delegates District 1C election, 2014
Party	Candidate	Votes	%
Republican	Mike McKay	6,388	57.0
Democratic	Nick Scarpelli	4,809	42.9
Write-in		9	0.1

Maryland House of Delegates District 1C election, 2018
Party	Candidate	Votes	%
Republican	Mike McKay (incumbent)	10,228	82.1
Green	Daniel DelMonte	2,177	17.5
Write-in		54	0.4

Maryland Senate District 1 Republican primary election, 2022
Party	Candidate	Votes	%
Republican	Mike McKay	9,265	55.0
Republican	Jake Shade	7,581	45.0

Maryland Senate District 1 election, 2022
Party	Candidate	Votes	%
Republican	Mike McKay	33,258	73.4
Democratic	Michael Dreischbach	11,995	26.5
