= Casper R. Taylor Jr. =

American politician (1934–2023)

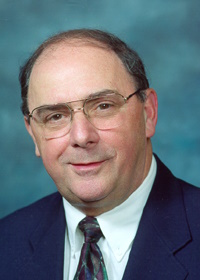
- Taylor in 1999

105th Speaker of the Maryland House of Delegates
- In office January 8, 1994 – January 8, 2003
- Preceded by: R. Clayton Mitchell Jr.
- Succeeded by: Michael E. Busch

Member of the Maryland House of Delegates from the 1C district
- In office January 1995 – January 8, 2003
- Preceded by: District created
- Succeeded by: LeRoy E. Myers Jr.

Member of the Maryland House of Delegates from the 2A district
- In office January 1975 – January 1995
- Preceded by: District created
- Succeeded by: Robert A. McKee

Personal details
- Born: December 19, 1934 Frostburg, Maryland, U.S.
- Died: April 24, 2023 (aged 88) Cumberland, Maryland, U.S.
- Party: Democratic
- Education: University of Notre Dame
- Profession: Lobbyist
- Casper R. Taylor Jr.'s voice Taylor welcomes President Bill Clinton to the Maryland General Assembly. Recorded February 10, 1997

Casper R. Taylor Jr. (December 19, 1934 – April 24, 2023) was an American politician who served as Speaker of the Maryland House of Delegates from 1994 to 2003, amongst the longest Speaker's tenures in Maryland history. He also represented Districts 1C and 2A in the House of Delegates from 1975 to 2003.

== Education ==
Taylor graduated from the University of Notre Dame in 1956, where he was a member of the Air Force ROTC. He started out his career as a restaurant owner, and was first elected to the House of Delegates in 1974.

== Career ==
Taylor is credited with helping to bring millions of dollars of state and private investments to the aid of his struggling district in Cumberland, including the state-backed Rocky Gap Lodge and Golf Resort. In the State House, Taylor authored many pieces of legislation over the course of his tenure, including the "One Maryland" bill, aimed at providing tax havens and other incentives for businesses to invest in depressed parts of the state.

Taylor was first elected to the House of Delegates for the 1975 legislative session to represent District 2A. In the 1994 election, he successfully ran as delegate for the newly created District 1C.

Taylor served until 2003 after losing his seat in the 2002 election. His loss is generally attributed to redrawn legislative district lines that added four heavily Republican precincts in Washington County to his traditionally Democratic district based around Cumberland, and his support for some gun control laws, which were unpopular in the rural parts of his district.

Taylor received numerous awards, including the Legislator Recognition Award from the Maryland Association of Counties in 1994 and 2001. He was awarded an Honorary Doctor of Humane Letters from the College of Notre Dame in 2001, Frostburg State University in 2000, and Villa Julie College in 1995. He received the First Citizen Award from the Maryland Senate in 2003 and the Thomas Kennedy Award from the Maryland House of Delegates in 2004.

In June 2003, Taylor became a lobbyist and government relations consultant for the Alexander and Cleaver firm in Annapolis. In January 2007, the new House of Delegates office building in Annapolis was named after Taylor. In May 2022, the Baltimore Street Bridge in Cumberland, Maryland, was named after Taylor.

== Personal life and death ==
Taylor was Catholic and was a former member of the Maryland Catholic Conference's administrative board. He died at his home in Cumberland, Maryland, on April 24, 2023, at the age of 88. On April 29, Governor Wes Moore ordered state flags to fly at half-staff in Taylor's honor.

== Election results ==
- 2002 Race for Maryland House of Delegates – District 01C

Voters to choose one:

Name	Votes	Percent	Outcome
LeRoy E. Myers Jr., Rep.	5,657	50.3%	Won
Casper R. Taylor, Dem.	5,581	49.6%	Lost

- 1998 Race for Maryland House of Delegates – District 01C

Voters to choose one:

Name	Votes	Percent	Outcome
Casper R. Taylor Jr., Dem.	6,205	70%	Won
Eileen Brinker Steele, Rep.	2,648	30%	Lost

- 1994 Race for Maryland House of Delegates – District 01C

Voters to choose one:

Name	Votes	Percent	Outcome
Casper R. Taylor Jr., Dem.	5,928	100%	Won

- 1990 Race for Maryland House of Delegates – District 2A

Voters to choose one:

Name	Votes	Percent	Outcome
Casper R. Taylor Jr., Dem.	4,116	65%	Won
Robert L. Lewis, Rep.	2,194	35%	Lost

- 1986 Race for Maryland House of Delegates – District 2A

Voters to choose one:

Name	Votes	Percent	Outcome
Casper R. Taylor Jr., Dem.	3,533	59%	Won
James M. Roby, Rep.	2,431	41%	Lost

== Citations ==
Preceded by R. Clayton Mitchell Jr.	Speaker of the Maryland House of Delegates; 1994–2003	Succeeded by Michael E. Busch
