= Jason C. Buckel =

American politician (born 1971)

Jason Buckel
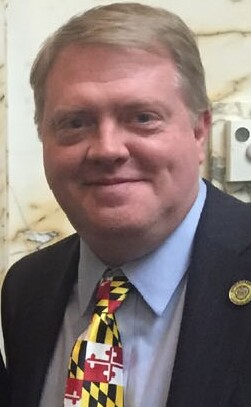

Minority Leader of the Maryland House of Delegates
- Incumbent
- Assumed office April 13, 2021
- Preceded by: Nic Kipke

Member of the Maryland House of Delegates from the 1B district
- Incumbent
- Assumed office January 14, 2015
- Preceded by: Kevin Kelly

Personal details
- Born: Jason Cord Buckel; November 3, 1971 (age 55) Allegany County, Maryland, U.S.
- Party: Republican
- Spouse: Cailey Locklair
- Children: 1
- Education: George Mason University (BA); University of Maryland, Baltimore (JD)

Jason Cord Buckel (born November 3, 1971) is an American politician and lawyer who has served as the minority leader in the Maryland House of Delegates since 2021. A member of the Republican Party, he has represented District 1B since 2015.

Born and raised in Allegany County, Maryland, Buckel graduated from George Mason University and the University of Maryland, Baltimore. He first became involved with politics in 2006, later serving as a coordinator for state senator Alex Mooney's exploratory committee to run for the U.S. House of Representatives in Maryland's 6th congressional district. He was elected to the Maryland House of Delegates in 2014, defeating four-term Democratic incumbent Kevin Kelly in the general election. In April 2021, Buckel was elected as the minority leader of the Maryland House of Delegates.

== Early life and career ==
Buckel was born in Allegany County, Maryland on November 3, 1971. He graduated from Bishop Walsh School in Cumberland, Maryland and attended George Mason University, where he earned a Bachelor of Arts degree in political science with honors, and the University of Maryland School of Law, where he earned a Juris Doctor degree with honors. He was admitted to the Maryland Bar in 1996. After graduating, he started his own law firm.

Buckel became involved with politics in 2006, when he became a member of the Maryland Republican Party. In 2012, Buckel led the Allegany County campaign for Alex Mooney's exploratory bid in Maryland's 6th congressional district. In February 2014, he filed to run for the Maryland House of Delegates, seeking to unseat incumbent Delegate Kevin Kelly. He defeated Kelly in the general election, receiving 58.9 percent of the vote.

== In the legislature ==
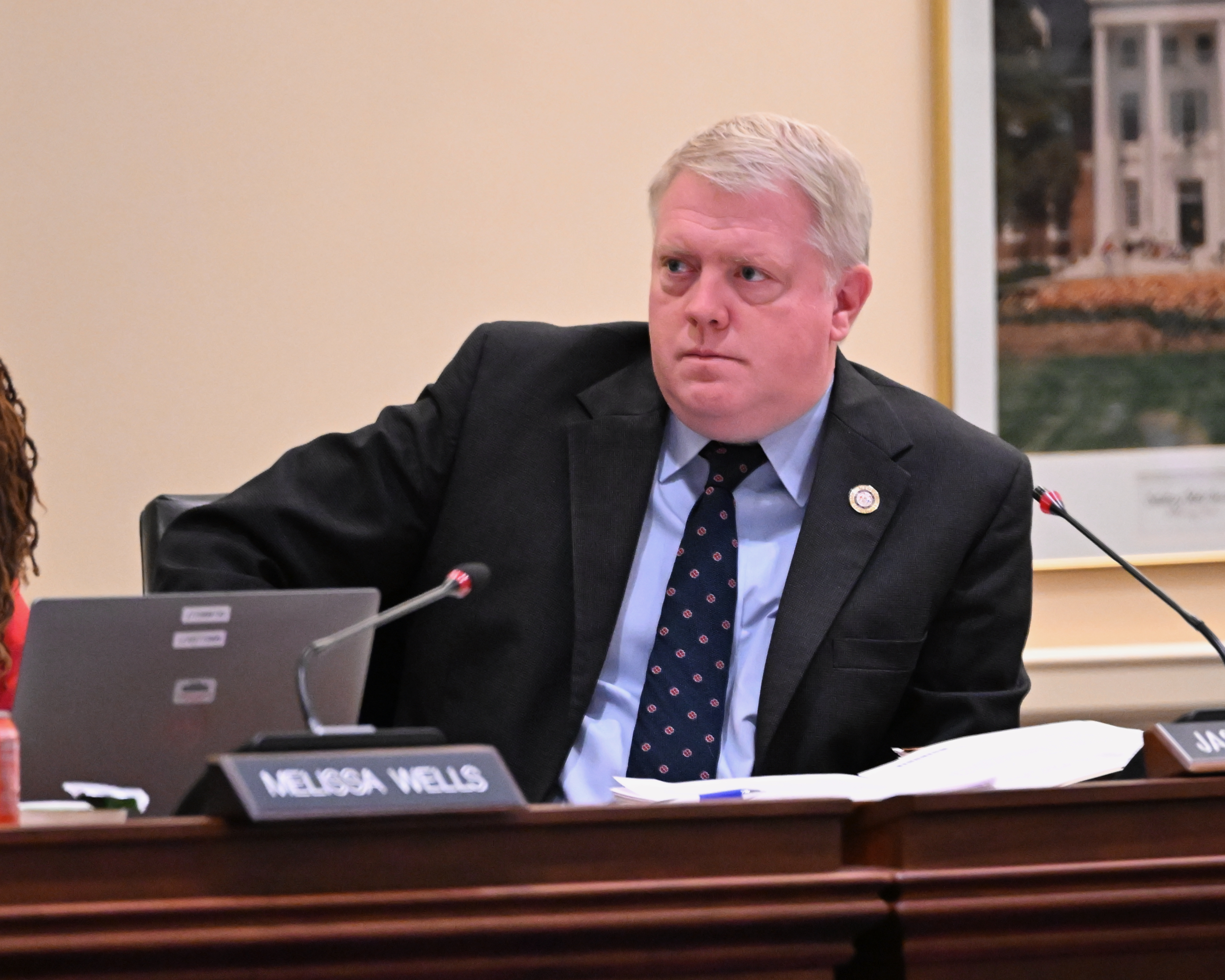
Buckel in the Ways and Means Committee, 2024

Buckel was sworn into the Maryland House of Delegates on January 14, 2015. He served as a member of the Ways and Means Committee until 2027, when he was moved to the Environment and Transportation Committee. From 2017 to 2018, Buckel served as the chief deputy whip for the House Republican Caucus, and as the minority leader of the Maryland House of Delegates since April 2021.

In 2016, Buckel filed to run for delegate for the Republican National Convention, representing Marco Rubio. He received 1.8 percent of the vote in the primary election.

On April 10, 2023, less than 10 minutes before the legislature adjourned sine die, House Speaker Adrienne A. Jones sought to move onto the next bill after Buckel had explained his vote on House Bill 1071. After a series of other Republican lawmakers began making appeals to also explain their votes, which were rejected by Jones, a shouting match led by Nic Kipke started and continued until the House adjourned, preventing several bills from receiving a final vote before the midnight deadline. During this, Buckel ordered Republican delegates to leave the chamber in protest of Jones rejecting delegates' appeals to speak; about a dozen lawmakers followed him to the doorway. Buckel denied that the disruption was a tactic to keep legislation from passing and later said he blamed Democratic lawmakers for the incident, arguing that they had "waited until the final minutes of the session to move controversial legislation with limited debate". After the General Assembly adjourned, the Legislative Black Caucus of Maryland demanded "a [public] apology for the disrespect" shown to Jones.

In December 2025, following the election of Joseline Peña-Melnyk as speaker of the Maryland House of Delegates, Buckel and the House Republican caucus agreed to establish a "rural caucus" with a direct line to House leadership after Peña-Melnyk announced a revamped leadership team consisting mostly of delegates representing urban and suburban areas of the state. During the 2026 legislative session, Buckel asked Peña-Melnyk to create an investigation committee with subpoena power, citing various audit findings that found Maryland overpaid $807.4 million in unemployment benefits and that the Maryland State Highway Administration overcharged $360 million in authorized expenses on to federal fund projects.

=== West Virginia annexation letter ===
In October 2021, Buckel was one of five Maryland state legislators from Garrett, Allegany and Washington counties who sent a pair of letters to West Virginia officials asking about annexation of Western Maryland to West Virginia. These letters caused a local uproar, with Jake Shade, an official from Allegany County running against one of the legislatures in the primaries, calling the request a political stunt, an embarrassment and unneeded distraction. Following criticism from local officials and some constituents, Buckel and state senator George Edwards issued a letter withdrawing support for the secession proposal. In an October 2024 interview with The Baltimore Sun, Buckel said that he suggested holding a non-binding secession straw poll among residents of counties in western Maryland to local lawmakers after hearing about West Virginia Governor Jim Justice suggesting that conservative counties in western Virginia should join West Virginia following the 2019 Virginia elections, in which Democrats gained control of both chambers of the Virginia General Assembly. The letters were sent to West Virginia officials while Buckel was on a hunting trip in South Dakota and he did not learn of the letters until he returned.

== Legal affairs ==
In December 2021, harassment charges were filed against Buckel in relation to his pending divorce. The complaint detailed more than three dozen messages sent by Buckel through Facebook Messenger to a Maryland State Police trooper who had a relationship with his estranged wife, including more than a half-dozen messages that had Buckel threatening to take his job and pension and to "destroy" and "bury" him. These charges were dropped by Frederick County prosecutors the next day.

In August 2023, WBFF reported that Buckel was under investigation for making death threats against a police officer who was dating his ex-wife. According to the police report, Buckel unexpectedly encountered his ex-wife and her boyfriend at a music festival at the Allegany County Fairgrounds, and became alert after noticing his son was not with them. He then began texting his ex-wife to ask where his son was, and approached an off-duty officer and said he would "put a bullet" in her boyfriend's head. The investigation was closed after Allegany County detectives interviewed Buckel about the incident, and no criminal charges were filed. In a statement to WBFF, Buckel disputed claims that he threatened her boyfriend.

In June 2024, Buckel was reportedly arrested for driving under the influence and with a suspended license. In a statement to WBFF, Buckel was driving home from a sports-themed restaurant after watching a National Hockey League hockey game when an officer pulled him over and arrested him; he denied having any alcoholic drinks beforehand or driving erratically on his way home. In November 2024, he entered an Alford plea to his DUI charges and received probation before judgment.

== Political positions ==
=== Criminal justice ===
During the 2015 legislative session, Buckel introduced a bill that would block law clinics from fighting against Maryland state agencies in court. The bill received an unfavorable report from the House Appropriations Committee.

During the 2021 legislative session, Buckel opposed a bill that would remove the Governor of Maryland from the parole process for people serving life sentences. The Maryland General Assembly voted to override Governor Hogan's veto on the bill during its special legislative session on December 7, 2021. Buckel also opposed legislation that would prohibit life without parole sentences for juvenile offenders, and introduced an amendment during the debate on the bill that would have banned it from applying to past offenses. The amendment was rejected in a 52–83 vote.

In February 2026, after a student shot another student at Thomas S. Wootton High School in Montgomery County, Buckel supported a bill that would expand the list of offenses for which a student can be arrested and would require law enforcement to notify the school and superintendent following arrest.

=== Energy ===
Buckel disagreed with Governor Larry Hogan's decision to support a ban on fracking in Maryland in 2018, saying that it would have brought jobs to Allegany and Garrett counties. During the 2026 legislative session, Buckel supported proposals to incentivize the construction of more power generation in Maryland to curb rising utility costs while faulting state policies encouraging renewable energy sources for rising energy prices. In March 2026, during debate on the Utility RELIEF Act, he introduced amendments to remove provisions relating to clean energy from the bill.

=== Fiscal issues ===
Buckel opposes introducing any new taxes, but supports the concept of bracketed local income tax as a way for counties to provide relief without losing too much revenue. During his 2014 campaign, he said that he would pursue a tax incentive program to bring cybersecurity and information technology to Allegany County. He also opposes increasing tobacco taxes, saying it would hurt local businesses by driving customers to West Virginia and Pennsylvania.

In April 2021, Buckel voted against legislation that would allow counties to set local income taxes at different rates for lower-income and wealthy residents.

In March 2022, Buckel voted against legislation that would extend a tax on health insurance companies, expressing concern that it results in higher premiums for people covered by group plans.

During the 2025 legislative session, amid a $3.3 billion state deficit, Buckel expressed concern with proposals to raise taxes to address the deficit. He opposed a compromise budget proposal negotiated by Governor Wes Moore and legislative leaders that included over $1 billion in new tax increases but $2 billion in spending cuts, which he argued would hurt middle- and upper-class individuals and make businesses leave the state. In March 2025, during debate on the budget proposal, Buckel proposed an amendment that would substitute tax increases in the bill with $1.6 billion in cuts to Medicaid, state employee hiring initiatives and salary increases, and programs supported by the Blueprint for Maryland's Future.

In January 2026, amid a $1.5 billion budget deficit, Buckel supported cuts to the Blueprint for Maryland's Future, saying that while the education reforms were well-intentioned and that some elements are worth keeping, the state could not afford to fully implement the reforms and that lawmakers had to be "fiscally responsible to your taxpayers". He also called for halting raises for some state employees while ensuring proper staffing and funding for law enforcement and mental health services.

In March 2026, following a spike in gas prices as a result of the 2026 Iran war, Buckel proposed a 30-day gas tax holiday.

In August 2026, during debate on a proposed constitutional amendment on redistricting, Buckel introduced an amendment that would require a supermajority of both chambers of the Maryland General Assembly to approve any tax increases.

=== Gun policy ===
Buckel does not support gun control regulations, saying that the government "does not have a right" to regulate firearms. In March 2022, during a debate on a bill that would ban sales of privately made firearms, Buckel introduced an amendment that would strengthen convictions for people convicted of firearm theft. The amendment was rejected on a vote of 50–80.

=== Housing ===
During the 2024 legislative session, Buckel opposed legislation to give tenants the right of first refusal if the property owner of their residence seeks to sell the property, saying that it would disincentivize developers from building in Maryland.

=== Immigration ===
During the 2021 legislative session, Buckel opposed a bill that would prohibit state and local governments from providing records or data to Immigration and Customs Enforcement (ICE) for the purpose of civil immigration enforcement.

In January 2026, Buckel opposed legislation to ban counties from entering into 287(g) program agreements with ICE, calling efforts to do so "performative virtue signaling". In February 2026, during debate on a bill that would allow a civil claim against anyone who violated another's constitutional rights under color of law, he unsuccessfully sought to amend the bill to require an internal or independent investigation to determine that a federal officer had infringed on someone's civil rights before the individual could sue the officer. He also opposed a bill to impose minimum mandatory safety standards on private immigration detention facilities, citing the Supremacy Clause.

=== Labor ===
Buckel opposes right-to-work laws, calling them "not necessary and not feasible." He also supports providing workers with prevailing wages on government projects. In September 2024, Buckel wrote a letter to Governor Wes Moore calling on him to repeal an executive order requiring state agencies to consider a company's use of project labor agreements when awarding contracts on large-scale public works projects, arguing that it puts local construction workers at a disadvantage to out-of-state employees.

=== Redistricting ===
Buckel supports using an independent redistricting commission to redraw every state's congressional districts. He has called Maryland "one of the most gerrymandered states in America", pointing out that Republicans control only one of Maryland's eight congressional districts despite the lowest performing Republican candidates in Maryland typically receiving at least a third of the vote in statewide elections. Buckel supports using single-member districts in the Maryland House of Delegates.

In August 2015, Buckel was appointed to the Maryland Redistricting Reform Commission by Governor Larry Hogan.

In July 2021, Buckel was appointed to the Maryland Legislative Redistricting Advisory Commission, which consisted of the leaders of each chamber of the Maryland General Assembly. He objected to the maps adopted by the commission over country splits. He later introduced an amendment that would switch the legislative redistricting panel's maps with those proposed by the Maryland Citizens Redistricting Commission. The amendment was rejected in a 43–93 vote. Buckel also opposed the legislative maps passed by the General Assembly in January 2022, saying that the legislative panel's map was drawn for partisan gain. He also opposed congressional maps passed by the General Assembly in March 2022.

In August 2025, amid Republican efforts to redraw Texas's congressional districts to gain five congressional seats in the 2026 United States House of Representatives elections, Buckel said he opposed mid-decade redistricting and efforts to redraw Maryland's congressional districts in response to Texas's mid-decade redistricting to make Maryland's 1st congressional district more favorable for Democrats. In October 2025, he supported Senate President Bill Ferguson's decision to rule out mid-decade redistricting in response to continued Republican redistricting efforts. After Governor Moore organized a commission to review mid-decade redistricting in Maryland in November 2025, Buckel said he would introduce a bill to ban mid-decade redistricting, codify part of a 2022 ruling that struck down Maryland's original congressional redistricting plan as an "extreme partisan gerrymander", and require Maryland's congressional districts to be drawn by an independent redistricting commission. He opposed the map proposed by the Governor's Redistricting Advisory Commission, which would improve the Democratic Party's chances of winning Maryland's 1st congressional district, saying that it was "clearly drawn with purely partisan purposes".

=== Social issues ===
Buckel opposes legalizing marijuana, calling the move a "Pandora's box". He has also said that decriminalizing and legalizing the drug would pose many difficult questions for law enforcement, including how to test for marijuana intoxication of drivers. Buckel did not rule out voting to allow the use of medical marijuana under tight controls. He voted against legislation creating 2022 Maryland Question 4, a ballot referendum to legalize recreational marijuana in Maryland.

During the 2022 legislative session, Buckel opposed legislation that banned regulated lobbyists from contributing from their personal funds to a candidate with the intent of influencing action from the candidate, questioning the bill's constitutionality amid the Supreme Court's Citizens United v. FEC decision.

During the 2025 legislative session, Buckel supported a bill to ban transgender students from competing on girls' sports teams in schools. He also said that he supported curriculum that teaches young students to respect LGBTQ individuals, but expressed concern with lessons for young students that go beyond those concepts and said that he supported providing parents with an option to opt their children out of such lessons. In June 2025, Buckel supported the U.S. Supreme Court's ruling in Mahmoud v. Taylor, which overturned Montgomery County Public Schools's policy of not allowing opt-outs of instruction involving LGBTQ-inclusive storybooks, saying that it "strikes a balance between the rights of parents to act in accordance with religious beliefs while still allowing public schools to reflect their greater community".

In November 2025, following the federal indictment of Cleveland Guardians players Emmanuel Clase and Luis Ortiz on charges of conspiracy to influence sporting contests by bribery, Buckel said he supported banning or severely limiting prop bets in Maryland.

During the 2026 legislative session, Buckel supported Kanaiyah's Law, a bill to codify the Maryland Department of Human Services's policy of prohibiting foster children from being housed in hotels. The bill was named for Kanaiyah Ward, a 16-year-old who died from an intentional Benadryl overdose while in DHS's custody.

=== Transportation ===
Buckel supports restoring highway user funds, saying that much of the funding is now being used for mass transit projects in metropolitan areas.

== Electoral history ==
Maryland House of Delegates District 1B Republican Primary Election, 2014
Party	Candidate	Votes	%
Republican	Jason C. Buckel	1,972	100.0%

Maryland House of Delegates District 1B General Election, 2014
Party	Candidate	Votes	%
Republican	Jason C. Buckel	6,664	58.9%
Republican	Kevin Kelly	4,623	40.9%
N/A	Other Write-ins	21	0.2%

Delegates to the Republican National Convention, District 6, 2016
Party	Candidate	Votes	%
Republican	Wendell Beitzel (Trump)	31,647	17.2%
Republican	Joeylynn Hough (Trump)	29,402	15.9%
Republican	Barrie S. Ciliberti (Trump)	29,402	15.9%
Republican	Neil C. Parrott (Cruz)	15,439	8.4%
Republican	Michael Hough (Cruz)	14,809	8.0%
Republican	Brett Wilson (Cruz)	13,878	7.5%
Republican	Jake Shade (Kasich)	13,036	7.1%
Republican	Jason C. Buckel (Rubio)	3,291	1.8%
Republican	William Joseph Wivell (Carson)	3,112	1.7%
Republican	Dave Caporale (Rubio)	3,018	1.6%
Republican	Mike McKay	2,832	1.5%
Republican	Erich Bean (Rubio)	2,319	1.3%
Republican	Laura Gabrielle Lightstone (Carson)	2,197	1.2%
Republican	Doro Bush Koch (Bush)	1,999	1.1%
Republican	Henry M. Ramirez (Bush)	1,712	0.9%
Republican	Marc A. Antonetti (Fiorina)	1,320	0.7%
Republican	Ignacio E. Sanchez (Bush)	1,169	0.6%
Republican	Ruth Marie Umbel (Christie)	1,131	0.6%
Republican	Daniel F. C. Crowley	997	0.5%
Republican	Robert Mitchell Wolfe (Fiorina)	981	0.5%
Republican	Kimberly Euler	786	0.4%
Republican	Cynthia Houser	771	0.4%
Republican	Billy Shreve	766	0.4%
Republican	Linda Lee Seibert	642	0.3%
Republican	Sandra Marie Myers	623	0.3%
Republican	Billy Shreve	766	0.4%
Republican	Scott L. Wolff	600	0.3%
Republican	Robert Schaefer	570	0.3%
Republican	Josephine J. Wang (Christie)	551	0.3%
Republican	Patricia A. Reilly	549	0.3%
Republican	Ryan Richard Miner	471	0.3%
Republican	Laura Patallo Sanchez	378	0.2%
Republican	Donna Buser Wallizer	357	0.2%
Republican	Therese Marie Shaheen	346	0.2%
Republican	Darren Wigfield	336	0.2%
Republican	Lawrence T. Di Rita	287	0.2%
Republican	Monica L. Stallworth	247	0.1%
Republican	Eric Salzano	168	0.1%
Republican	William S. Richbourg	135	0.1%

Maryland House of Delegates District 1B Republican Primary Election, 2018
Party	Candidate	Votes	%
Republican	Jason C. Buckel	3,196	100.0%

Maryland House of Delegates District 1B General Election, 2018
Party	Candidate	Votes	%
Republican	Jason C. Buckel	8,074	62.6%
Republican	Penny Lyn Walker	4,826	37.4%
N/A	Other Write-ins	5	0.0%

Maryland House of Delegates
Preceded by Nic Kipke	Minority Leader of the Maryland House of Delegates; 2021–present	Incumbent
