= Betty Workman =

American politician from Maryland

Member of the Maryland House of Delegates from the 1B district
- In office January 14, 1987 – January 13, 1999
- Preceded by: W. Timothy Finan
- Succeeded by: Kevin Kelly

Personal details
- Born: September 26, 1924 Cumberland, Maryland, U.S.
- Died: May 1, 2018 (aged 93) La Vale, Maryland, U.S.
- Party: Democratic

Betty Workman (September 26, 1924 – May 1, 2018) was an American politician who served in the Maryland House of Delegates from District 1B from 1987 to 1999. She was a member of the Democratic party.

She died on May 1, 2018, in La Vale, Maryland at age 93.
