= Maryland House of Delegates District 1B =

American legislative district

Maryland's legislative district 1B
- Represents part of Allegany County
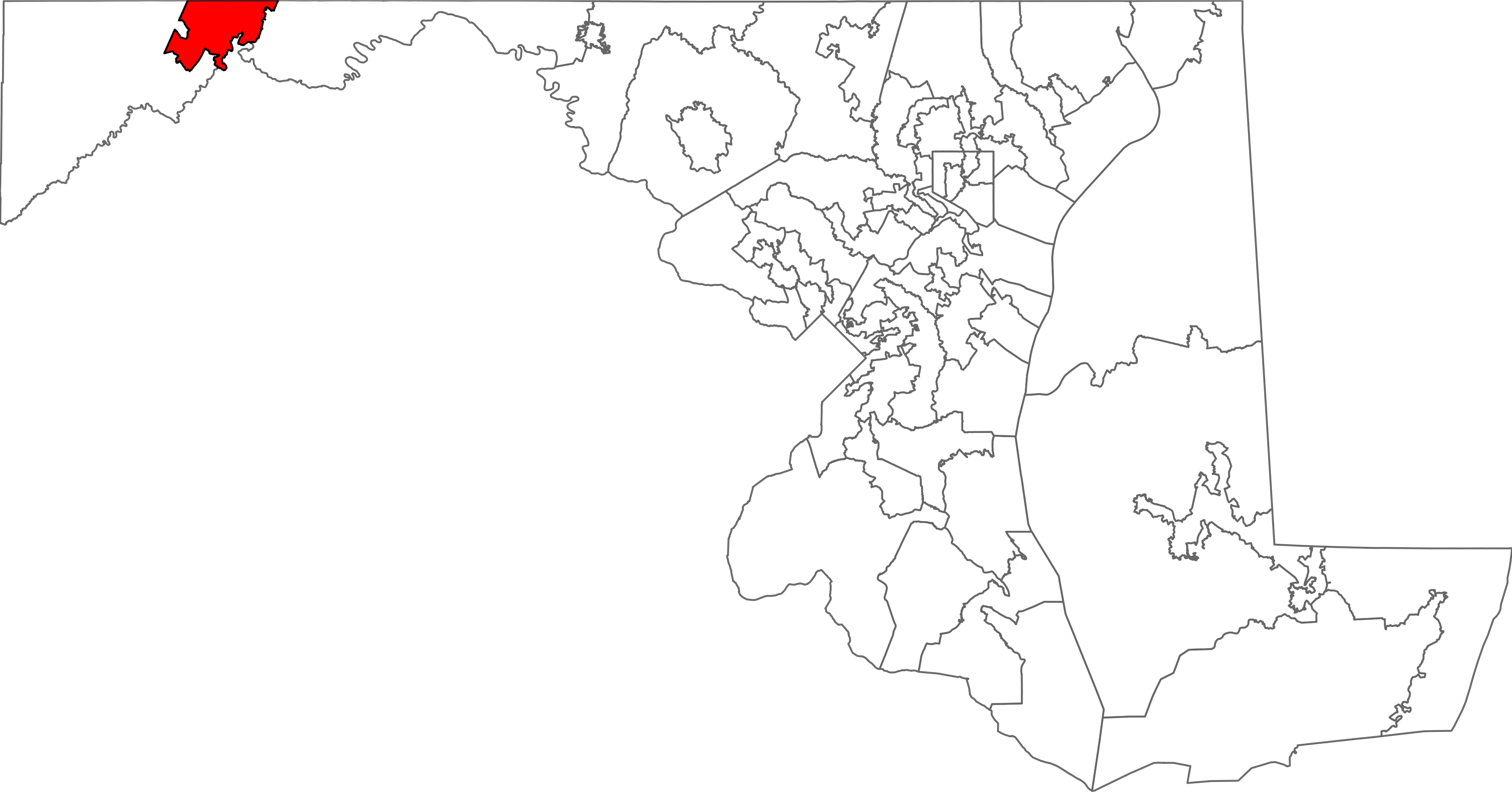
- Delegate(s): Jason C. Buckel (R)
- Registration: 51.6% Republican; 29.6% Democratic; 17.2% unaffiliated
- Demographics: 84.0% White; 9.5% Black/African American; 0.2% Native American; 1.3% Asian; 0.0% Hawaiian/Pacific Islander; 0.9% Other race; 4.1% Two or more races; 1.7% Hispanic
- Population (2020): 37,328
- Voting-age population: 31,058
- Registered voters: 23,824

Maryland House of Delegates District 1B is one of the 71 districts that compose the Maryland House of Delegates. Along with subdistricts 1A and 1C, it makes up the 1st district of the Maryland Senate. Near the state's western border, District 1B is located entirely within Allegany County. It is represented by one delegate. Since 2015, it has been represented by Jason C. Buckel, a Republican.

District 1B elected 2 delegates until the 1994 election, when District 1C was created.

== Demographic characteristics ==
As of the 2020 United States census, the district had a population of 37,328, of whom 31,058 (83.2%) were of voting age. The racial makeup of the district was 31,342 (84.0%) White, 3,542 (9.5%) African American, 80 (0.2%) Native American, 468 (1.3%) Asian, 8 (0.0%) Pacific Islander, 338 (0.9%) from some other race, and 1,543 (4.1%) from two or more races. Hispanic or Latino of any race were 639 (1.7%) of the population.

The district had 23,824 registered voters as of October 17, 2020, of whom 4,105 (17.2%) were registered as unaffiliated, 12,301 (51.6%) were registered as Republicans, 7,054 (29.6%) were registered as Democrats, and 194 (0.8%) were registered to other parties.

== Past Election Results ==
=== 1982 ===
Voters to choose no more than 2.
Name	Party	Outcome
William B. Byrnes	Democratic	Won
W. Timothy Finan	Democratic	Won
W. Ardell Haines	Republican	Lost
R. Neil Williams	Republican	Lost

=== 1986 ===
Voters to choose no more than 2.
Name	Party	Votes	Percent	Outcome
Betty Workman	Democratic	8,195	29.1%	Won
Kevin Kelly	Democratic	7,858	27.9%	Won
Robert M. Hutcheson	Republican	6,151	21.8%	Lost
William R. Davis	Republican	5,984	21.2%	Lost

=== 1990 ===
Voters to choose no more than 2.
Name	Party	Votes	Percent	Outcome
Kevin Kelly	Democratic	11,579	40.9%	Won
Betty Workman	Democratic	11,413	40.3%	Won
H. Dolores Chase Morgan	Republican	5,321	18.8%	Lost

=== 1994 ===
The 1994 election marked the split of District 1B, creating District 1C. Both delegates ran in the Democratic primary, with Betty Workman defeating Kevin Kelly.

Name	Party	Votes	Percent	Outcome
Betty Workman	Democratic	7,050	68.8%	Won
Stephen P. Crossland	Republican	3,204	31.2%	Lost

=== 1998 ===
Former delegate Kevin Kelly defeated incumbent Betty Workman in the Democratic primary.

Name	Party	Votes	Percent	Outcome
Kevin Kelly	Democratic	5,232	51.2%	Won
Tricia Wolfe	Republican	4,991	48.8%	Lost

=== 2002 ===
Name	Party	Votes	Percent	Outcome
Kevin Kelly	Democratic	6,654	55.7%	Won
Tricia Wolfe	Republican	5,286	44.3%	Lost
Other Write-Ins		4	0.0%	

=== 2006 ===
Name	Party	Votes	Percent	Outcome
Kevin Kelly	Democratic	6,489	55.7%	Won
Mark A. Fisher	Republican	5,151	44.2%	Lost
Other Write-Ins		20	0.2%	

=== 2010 ===
Name	Party	Votes	Percent	Outcome
Kevin Kelly	Democratic	6,226	51.3%	Won
Mary Beth Pirolozzi	Republican	5,908	48.6%	Lost
Other Write-Ins		12	0.1%	

=== 2014 ===
In the 2014 Election, Republican Jason C. Buckel won an easy victory over the longtime incumbent, Democrat Kevin Kelly.

Name	Party	Votes	Percent	Outcome
Jason C. Buckel	Republican	6,664	58.9%	Won
Kevin Kelly	Democratic	4,623	40.9%	Lost
Other Write-Ins		21	0.2%	

=== 2018 ===
Name	Party	Votes	Percent	Outcome
Jason C. Buckel	Republican	8,074	62.6%	Won
Penny Lyn Walker	Democratic	4,826	37.4%	Lost
Other Write-Ins		5	0.0%	

=== 2022 ===
Two-term Republican incumbent Jason C. Buckel, ran for a third term unopposed.

Republican primary results
Party	Candidate	Votes	%
Republican	Jason C. Buckel (incumbent)	3,808	100.0

Results by precinct Buckel: >90%

General Election results
Party	Candidate	Votes	%
Republican	Jason C. Buckel (incumbent)	11,209	96.40%
Write-in		419	3.60%
Total votes		11,628	3.60%
Republican hold			
