= LeRoy E. Myers Jr. =

American politician (born 1951)

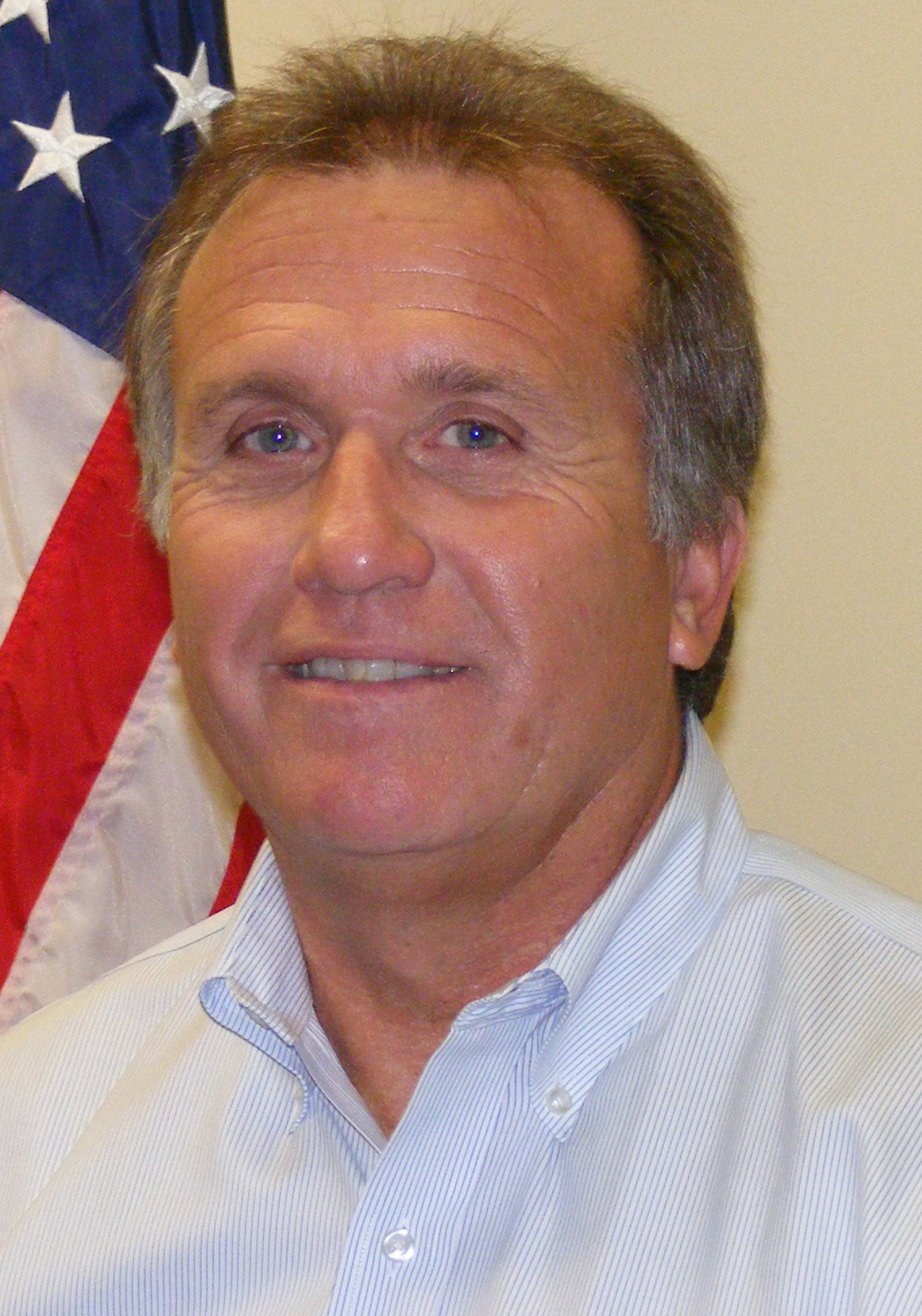

Washington County Commissioner
- In office December 15, 2014 – December 4, 2018

Member of the Maryland House of Delegates from the 1C district
- In office January 8, 2003 – December 15, 2014
- Preceded by: Casper R. Taylor Jr.
- Succeeded by: Mike McKay

Personal details
- Born: LeRoy Ellsworth Myers Jr. October 8, 1951 (age 74) Hagerstown, Maryland, U.S.
- Party: Republican
- Spouse: Nicole Alt-Myers
- Children: 7
- Profession: Construction

LeRoy E. Myers Jr. (born October 8, 1951) is an American politician from the U.S. state of Maryland.

== Background ==
Myers was first elected to the Maryland House of Delegates in 2003 representing District 1C, which covers parts of Allegany and Washington counties. He defeated long-time delegate and Speaker of the House, Casper R. Taylor. Taylor had been a staunch proponent to bring slot machines into Maryland, but despite his defeat by Myers, the passage of slot machines prevailed with the 2008 referendum. In 2006, Myers defeated Brian Grim.

== Education ==
Myers attended Hagerstown Community College for one semester. No other college experience.

== Career ==
Myers served in U.S. Army Reserve from 1970–76. He is the owner of a General Contracting Company in Western Maryland, Myers Building Systems, which he formed in 1985 after working for over 15 years with his father's company, LeRoy Myers, Inc.

=== Legislative notes ===
- Voted against the Clean Indoor Air Act of 2007 (HB359)
- Voted against in-state tuition for illegal immigrants in 2007 (HB6)
- Voted against the Healthy Air Act in 2006 (SB154)
- Voted against slots in 2005 (HB1361)

In 2007, Myers made a proposal to "prohibit motorists from displaying anything resembling or depicting 'anatomically correct' or 'less than completely and opaquely covered' human or animal genitals, human buttocks or female breasts". He was referring to the popular accessories for pickup trucks and other vehicles known as truck nuts, calling the dangling testicles "vulgar and immoral," and stated that his proposal was made at the request of a constituent who was offended by the accessories.

== Election results ==
- 2006 Race for Maryland House of Delegates – District 01C

Voters to choose one:

| Name | Votes | Percent | Outcome |
|---|---|---|---|
| LeRoy E. Myers Jr., Rep. | 6,398 | 57.2% | Won |
| Brian K. Grim, Dem. | 4,769 | 42.7% | Lost |

- 2002 Race for Maryland House of Delegates – District 01C

Voters to choose one:

| Name | Votes | Percent | Outcome |
|---|---|---|---|
| LeRoy E. Myers Jr., Rep. | 5,657 | 50.3% | Won |
| Casper R. Taylor, Dem. | 5,581 | 49.6% | Lost |
