= Truck nuts =

Automobile accessory resembling a dangling scrotum

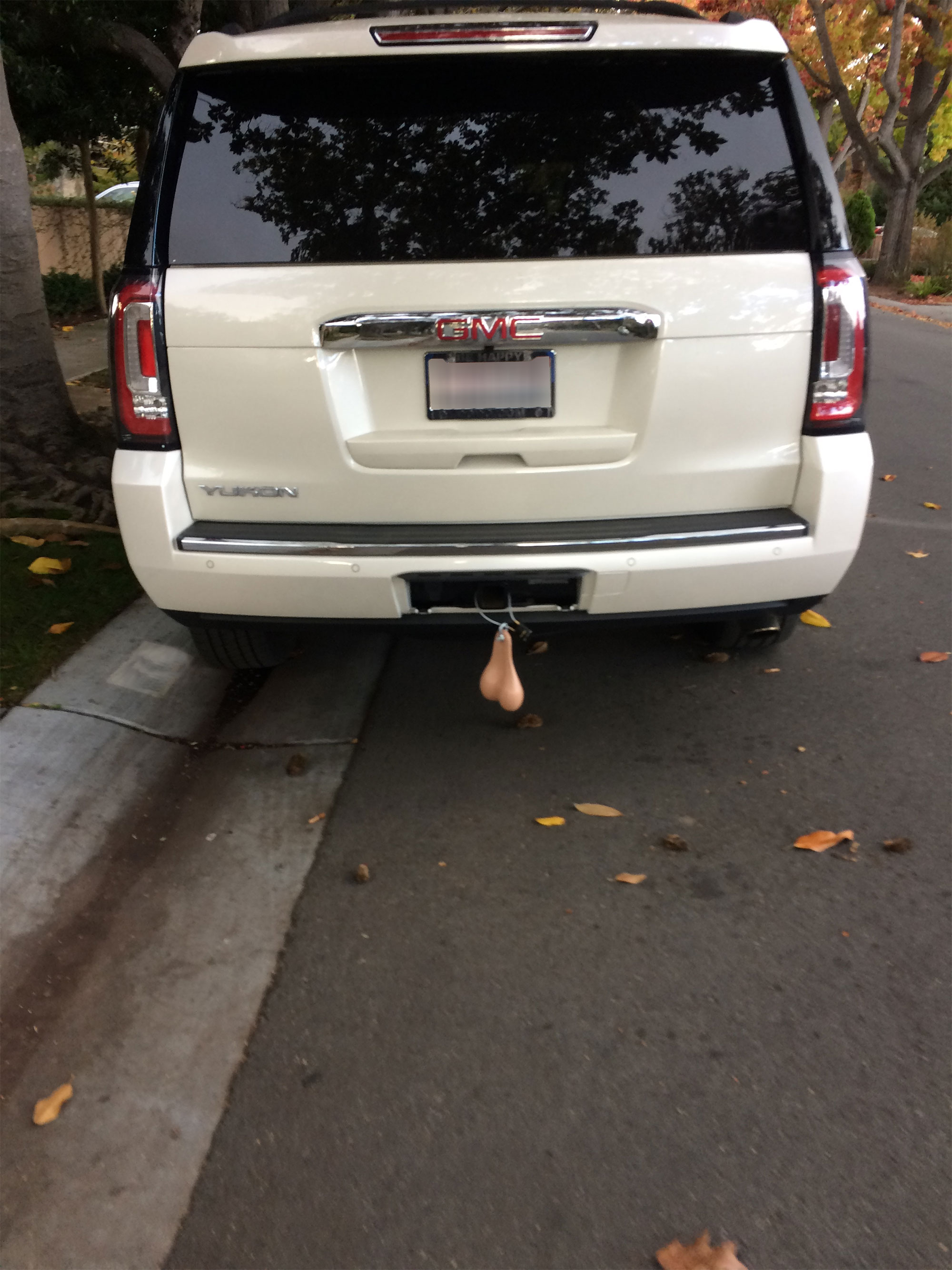
Truck nuts attached to the rear of an SUV

Truck nuts, also spelled truck nutz, are vehicular vanity accessories resembling a dangling scrotum. They are attached under the rear bumper or trailer hitch, making them plainly visible to other vehicles behind.

== History ==
Truck nuts began appearing in small numbers as custom-made scrotum sacks in the 1980s. The earliest known store-bought truck nuts appeared in the late 1990s but remained limited in number. However, their popularity surged in the mid- to late 2000s, and truck nuts became known throughout the United States, even featuring on national television shows.

A number of people claim to have invented the truck nuts industry (i.e. plastic store-bought truck nuts). David Ham, owner of YourNutz.com, said he saw a pair of custom truck nuts at a rally in the 1980s, then in 1996 began manufacturing and selling plastic truck nuts commercially. John D. Sallers, owner of BullsBalls.com, says he was out driving his 4×4 off-road when someone yelled: "Go Ernie, show'em you got balls!", which inspired the idea and he began selling them in 2002. The two men sold Truck Nuts through the late 1990s and 2000s, competing both in the market and in private, exchanging angry phone calls and emails. This conflict escalated into public relations wars, social media conflicts, posts on review sites, blog attack posts, and finally to legal cease and desist orders. Vice News published an article about the feud titled "Balls Out: The Weird Story of the Great Truck Nuts War".

=== Obscenity versus free speech ===
In 2007, Maryland legislator LeRoy E. Myers Jr. proposed prohibiting motorists from "displaying anything resembling or depicting 'anatomically correct' or 'less than completely and opaquely covered' human or animal genitals, human buttocks or female breasts". He said fake testicles were "vulgar and immoral", and said his proposal had been requested by an offended resident. In Virginia in 2008, Delegate Lionell Spruill proposed Bill HB 1452 to prohibit truck owners from displaying or otherwise equipping their vehicles with devices resembling human genitalia. In April 2008, the Florida Senate voted for a $60 fine for displaying truck nuts, but it did not pass the House.

In 2011, a 65-year-old South Carolina woman was ticketed by the town's police chief for obscenity displaying truck nuts on her pickup. The case, originating in Bonneau, South Carolina (population approximately 480), was pending jury trial on her $445 traffic ticket. The case was continued three times and no new trial date was set. According to the Above the Law legal analysis blog, the ban was discussed in the ABA Journal and presents constitutional freedom of speech questions.

The stated position of the Honolulu Police Department on obscene decor on vehicles, such as "exaggerated male genitals hung from rear bumpers", as stated in 2013 by their city corporation counsel's office, is that "[it] may be tasteless but it's protected as free speech."

In March 2025, Idaho passed House Bill 270 into law, expanding its definition of indecent exposure. This bill made it a misdemeanor to "[display] toys or products intended to resemble male or female genitals," including truck nuts, in public when another person present is offended by it.
