= Thomas B. Finan =

American politician and judge (1914–1972)

Secretary of State of Maryland
- In office 1959–1961
- Governor: J. Millard Tawes
- Preceded by: Claude B. Hellmann
- Succeeded by: Lloyd Lewis Simpkins

Attorney General of Maryland
- In office 1961–1966
- Governor: J. Millard Tawes
- Preceded by: C. Ferdinand Sybert
- Succeeded by: Robert C. Murphy

Personal details
- Born: June 30, 1914 Cumberland, Maryland, U.S.
- Died: May 6, 1972 (aged 57) Cumberland, Maryland, U.S.
- Resting place: Saints Peter and Paul Cemetery; Cumberland, Maryland, U.S.
- Party: Democratic
- Spouse: Isabel Jean North (m. 1941)
- Children: 2, including W. Timothy
- Education: Georgetown University (BA); University of Maryland School of Law

Thomas B. Finan (June 30, 1914 – May 6, 1972) was an American politician and judge from Maryland. He served as secretary of state of Maryland from 1959 to 1961 and as attorney general of Maryland from 1961 to 1966.

== Early life ==
Thomas B. Finan was born on June 30, 1914, in Cumberland, Maryland, to Mary M. (née Dolan) and Thomas B. Finan. His father was a banker and businessman. He graduated from LaSalle Institute, a high school in Cumberland. He played quarterback in the school's football team. He graduated cum laude with a Bachelor of Arts from Georgetown University in 1936. Finan graduated from the University of Maryland School of Law in 1939 and was admitted to the bar the same year.

== Career ==
Finan served in the infantry during World War II. He served from June 1941 to September 1945, which included 23 months in the European theater with the 45th Infantry Division. He was a prisoner of war in Poland for nine months. At the time of his discharge, he had attained the rank of captain. He received the Legion of Merit and was a major in the honorary reserve.

From 1945 to 1966, Finan had a private practice with William C. Walsh and William Walsh. He served eight years as the city solicitor of Cumberland. During his tenure as solicitor, he was responsible for cases relating to the Cumberland-Ridgeley flood protection project. He was a Democrat and served as the state's party chairman from 1960 to 1961 and was a delegate to the 1956, 1960 and 1964 Democratic National Conventions. He served as the secretary of state of Maryland from 1959 to 1961. He was appointed as attorney general of Maryland by Governor J. Millard Tawes in 1961, succeeding C. Ferdinand Sybert. He was then elected to the role in 1962 and served a four year term until 1966. While attorney general, he presided over the U.S. Supreme Court case of Madalyn Murray O'Hair to ban prayer in public schools. In 1966, he was appointed to the Maryland Court of Appeals by Governor Tawes. He was sworn in on October 13, 1966, succeeding Stedman Prescott. He was elected to the role in 1968 to a 15–year term. He served until his death.

Finan was a fellow of the American College of Trial Lawyers, a member of the board of directors of the American Judicature Society and vice president of the Maryland Bar. He served as president of the Allegany County Bar Association. He served as president of the lay board of the Sacred Heart Hospital in Cumberland. He was president of the Cumberland Kiwanis Club.

== Personal life ==
Finan married Isabel Jean North, daughter of William North, of Cambridge, Maryland, on August 13, 1941. They had two sons, Thomas B. Jr. and W. Timothy. He lived on Washington Street in Cumberland.

Finan died at his office in the Liberty Trust Company Building in Cumberland on May 6, 1972. He was buried in Saints Peter and Paul Cemetery in Cumberland.

== Awards ==
Finan received an honorary doctorate degree from Mount St. Mary's University in 1965.
