= William B. Byrnes =

American politician

Member of the Maryland House of Delegates from the 1B district
- In office 1975–1986 Serving with W. Timothy Finan
- Preceded by: district established
- Succeeded by: Kevin Kelly

Member of the Maryland House of Delegates
- In office 1971–1974
- Preceded by: Edward T. Evans Jr.
- Succeeded by: districts established
- Constituency: Allegany County, Maryland

Personal details
- Born: May 31, 1906 Eckhart Mines, Maryland, U.S.
- Died: February 26, 1989 (aged 82) Cumberland, Maryland, U.S.
- Resting place: St. Michael's Church; Frostburg, Maryland, U.S.
- Party: Democratic
- Education: State Teachers College at Frostburg

Military service
- Allegiance: United States
- Branch/service: United States Army
- Battles/wars: World War II

William B. Byrnes (May 31, 1906 – February 26, 1989) was an American politician. He served in the Maryland House of Delegates, representing Allegany County from 1971 to 1974 and District 1B from 1975 to 1986.

== Early life ==
William B. Byrnes was born on May 31, 1906, in Eckhart Mines, Maryland. He attended parochial and public schools in Allegany County. He graduated from State Teachers College at Frostburg in 1926.

== Career ==
Byrnes worked as an inspector for the Maryland Motor Vehicle Administration and as a sales manager for W. K. Kellogg Company. He also worked as a teacher. He served in the U.S. Army during World War II.

Byrnes became a member of the Maryland House of Delegates in 1971 and represented Allegany County from 1971 to 1974 and District 1B from 1975 to 1986. He was a Democrat. During his career, he turned down donations and self-funded his political campaigns.

== Personal life ==
Byrnes owned his family's hardware store in Frostburg, Maryland until the early 1980s.

Byrnes died on February 26, 1989, at Sacred Heart Hospital in Cumberland, Maryland. He was buried in the parish cemetery at St. Michael's Church in Frostburg.
