= W. Timothy Finan =

American politician (born 1950)

Member of the Maryland House of Delegates from the 1B district
- In office 1983–1987 Serving with William B. Byrnes
- Succeeded by: Betty Workman

Personal details
- Born: August 29, 1950 (age 75) Cumberland, Maryland, U.S.
- Party: Democratic
- Parent: Thomas B. Finan (father)

W. Timothy Finan (born August 29, 1950) is a retired American politician and judge. Finn served in the Maryland House of Delegates from District 1B from 1983 to 1987.

== Early life ==
W. Timothy Finan was born on August 29, 1950, in Cumberland, Maryland to Isabel N. Finan and Judge Thomas B. Finan. He attended McDonogh School in Owings Mills. Finan graduated from Georgetown University with a Bachelor of Science in business administration in 1972. He graduated from University of Baltimore School of Law with a J.D. in 1975. He was admitted to the bar in Maryland in 1975. During his third year in law school, he worked in the Baltimore City public defender's office, and he clerked the summers of 1973 and 1974 for Judges Harold E. Naughton and James S. Getty of the Allegany County Circuit Court.

== Career ==
Finan clerked for chief judge Robert C. Murphy of the Maryland Court of Appeals in 1975. He worked as an associate for Walsh, Walsh & Reinhart from 1979 to 1986.

In 1982, Finan was elected to the Maryland House of Delegates to represent District 1B. He served one term, representing the district from 1983 to 1987. He was a Democrat. On July 20, 1987, Finan became an associate judge in the District Court of Maryland, District 12, representing Allegany County. He served until June 17, 2002.

In 2002, Finan became an associate judge with the Allegany County Circuit Court, until November 9, 2015. Finan then served as the county administrative judge at the Circuit Court until he retired on August 29, 2020. Finan also served as circuit administrative judge for the 4th Judicial Court, representing Allegany, Garrett and Washington counties, from November 1, 2016, to August 29, 2020. He served as the chief judge of the 4th Judicial Court from 2009 to 2020.
