= C. Ferdinand Sybert =

American judge (1900–1982)

- Sybert ca. 1955

Attorney General of Maryland
- In office 1954–1961
- Preceded by: Edward D. E. Rollins
- Succeeded by: Thomas B. Finan

Judge of the Maryland Court of Appeals
- In office 1961–1965
- Preceded by: New seat
- Succeeded by: William J. McWilliams

Speaker of the Maryland House of Delegates
- In office 1947–1950
- Preceded by: John S. White
- Succeeded by: John C. Luber

Personal details
- Born: September 16, 1900 Loretto, Pennsylvania, U.S.
- Died: March 29, 1982 (aged 81) Ellicott City, Maryland, U.S.
- Resting place: St. Augustine Cemetery, Elkridge, Maryland
- Spouse: Elizabeth J. Johnson
- Children: 2 sons, 1 daughter
- Education: Loyola College of Baltimore (A.B.); University of Maryland School of Law (LL.B.)
- Occupation: Judge, lawyer, politician

C. Ferdinand Sybert (September 16, 1900 – March 29, 1982) was Attorney General of Maryland from 1954 to 1961, and a justice of the Maryland Court of Appeals from 1961 to 1965.

== Life and career ==
Born in Loretto, Pennsylvania, to Pius A. Sybert, a grocer, and Anna Marie (Haid) Sybert, the family moved to Elkridge, Maryland, in 1902. Sybert attended parochial schools in Elkridge and Baltimore, then received an A.B. from Loyola College of Baltimore in 1922, followed by an LL.B. from the University of Maryland School of Law in 1925. While in law school, Sybert worked as a reporter for the Baltimore News-Post. He gained admission to the bar in Maryland in 1925.

In 1926, he ran unsuccessfully for a position as state's attorney, losing the Democratic primary. He won that office in 1934, and was re-elected in 1938 and 1942. In 1946, Sybert was elected to the Maryland House of Delegates, and due to his support of the candidacy of Governor William Preston Lane Jr., was made speaker. He was elected attorney general of the state in 1954, and reelected in 1958.

Governor J. Millard Tawes appointed Sybert to a newly established seat on the court of appeals, to which Sybert was sworn in on January 13, 1961.

After his judicial career, Sybert continued to practice law as a partner in the firm Sybert, Sybert and Nippard from 1965 to 1974. He also participated in the 1967 Constitutional Convention of Maryland as a delegate from Howard County.

== Personal life and death ==
Sybert married Elizabeth J. Johnson, with whom he had two sons and a daughter. His son, C. Ferdinand Sybert Jr., followed in his father's footsteps and became a prominent lawyer in Maryland.

Sybert was actively involved in his community, serving on various boards and committees, including the Elkridge Rotary Club and the Howard County Bar Association.

He died in Ellicott City, Maryland, at the age of 81, and was interred at St. Augustine Cemetery, Elkridge, Howard County.

== Legacy ==
Sybert's contributions to Maryland's legal and political landscape were significant. His tenure as Attorney General and as a judge helped shape the judicial system in the state. He was known for his commitment to justice and his efforts to modernize the court system.

Political offices
Preceded by Newly established seat	Judge of the Maryland Court of Appeals; 1961–1965	Succeeded by William J. McWilliams
Preceded by Edward D. E. Rollins	Attorney General of Maryland; 1954–1961	Succeeded by Thomas B. Finan
Preceded by John S. White	Speaker of the Maryland House of Delegates; 1947–1950	Succeeded by John C. Luber
