= 1986 Maryland House of Delegates election =

- November 4, 1986

All 141 seats in the Maryland House of Delegates 71 seats needed for a majority
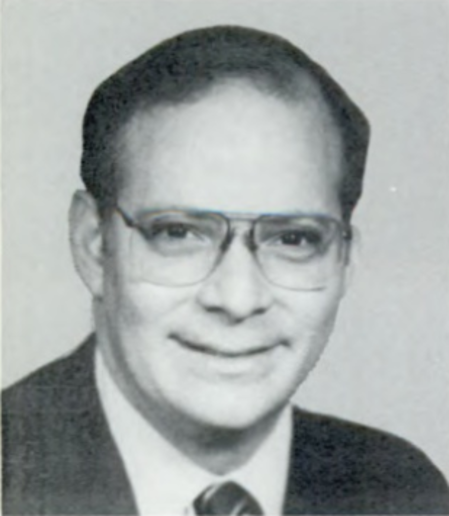

	Majority party	Minority party
Leader	Ben Cardin (retired)	Robert R. Neall (retired)
Party	Democratic	Republican
Leader since	January 6, 1979	1983
Leader's seat	42nd district	33rd district
Last election	124	17
Seats won	124	17
Seat change	Steady	Steady
- Results: Democratic gain Republican gain Democratic hold Republican hold
Speaker before election
Ben Cardin
Democratic
Elected Speaker
R. Clayton Mitchell Jr.
Democratic

The 1986 Maryland House of Delegates elections were held on November 4, 1986, as part of the 1986 United States elections, including the 1986 Maryland gubernatorial election. All 141 of Maryland's state delegates were up for reelection.

== Retiring incumbents ==
=== Democrats ===
1. District 1B: William B. Byrnes retired.
2. District 1B: W. Timothy Finan retired.
3. District 9: Donald K. Hughes retired.
4. District 9: Thomas B. Kernan retired to run for Baltimore County Executive.
5. District 11: Arthur S. Alperstein retired to run for state senator in District 11.
6. District 11: Paula Hollinger retired to run for state senator in District 11.
7. District 14: Edward J. Kasemeyer retired to run for state senator in District 14.
8. District 16: Marilyn R. Goldwater retired to run for state senator in District 16.
9. District 18: Helen L. Koss retired.
10. District 19: Idamae Garrott retired to run for state senator in District 19.
11. District 19: Lucille Maurer retired to run for state senator in District 19.
12. District 20: Diane Kirchenbauer retired to run for state senator in District 20.
13. District 20: Ida G. Ruben retired to run for state senator in District 20.
14. District 22: Frank Pesci retired.
15. District 25: Jerry E. Perry retired to run for state senator in District 25.
16. District 25: Albert Wynn retired to run for state senator in District 25.
17. District 26: Frederick C. Rummage retired.
18. District 28B: John Knight Parlett retired.
19. District 30: Elmer F. Hagner Jr. retired.
20. District 30: Robert G. Kramer retired.
21. District 41: Wendell H. Phillips retired to run for Congress in Maryland's 7th congressional district.
22. District 42: Ben Cardin retired to run for Congress in Maryland's 3rd congressional district.

=== Republicans ===
1. District 16: Connie Morella retired to run for Congress in Maryland's 8th congressional district.
2. District 21: Thomas J. Mooney retired to run for governor.
3. District 32: Robert R. Neall retired to run for Congress in Maryland's 4th congressional district.
4. District 38: Lewis R. Riley retired to run for state senator in District 38.

== Incumbents defeated ==
=== In primary elections ===
==== Democrats ====
1. District 3A: Paul D. Muldowney lost renomination to Bruce Poole.
2. District 8: Dale Anderson lost renomination to Donna M. Felling and incumbents Joseph Bartenfelder and William J. Burgess.
3. District 19: Joseph E. Owens lost renomination to Henry B. Heller, Carol S. Petzold, and Leonard H. Teitelbaum.
4. District 22: David Bird lost renomination to Anne MacKinnon, Paul G. Pinsky, and incumbent Richard A. Palumbo.
5. District 26: Marian L. Patterson lost renomination to Rosa Lee Blumenthal, Gloria G. Lawlah, and incumbent Christine Miller Jones.
6. District 31: William Turc Sr. lost renomination to W. Ray Huff, James J. Riley, and incumbent Charles W. Kolodziejski.
7. District 40: Mary B. Adams lost renomination to Tony E. Fulton and incumbents Ralph M. Hughes and Pete Rawlings.
8. District 43: Charles Bucky Muth lost renomination to Ann Marie Doory and incumbents Gerald Curran and Henry R. Hergenroeder Jr.

==== Republicans ====
1. District 4B: V. Lanny Harchenhorn lost renomination to Donald B. Elliott.
2. District 10: Thomas W. Chamberlain Sr. lost renomination to Bob Ehrlich and incumbents Wade Kach and Ellen Sauerbrey.

=== In general elections ===
==== Republicans ====
1. District 3B: M. Albert Morningstar lost to James E. McClellan and Royd Smith.

== Detailed results ==
All election results are from the Maryland State Board of Elections.

=== District 1A ===
Maryland House of Delegates District 1A election
Party	Candidate	Votes	%
Republican	George C. Edwards (incumbent)	5,648	100.0
Republican hold			

=== District 1B ===
Maryland House of Delegates District 1B election
Party	Candidate	Votes	%
Democratic	Betty Workman	8,195	29.1
Democratic	Kevin Kelly	7,858	27.9
Republican	Robert M. Hutcheson	6,151	21.8
Republican	William R. Davis	5,984	21.2
Democratic hold			
Democratic hold			

=== District 2A ===
Maryland House of Delegates District 2A election
Party	Candidate	Votes	%
Democratic	Casper R. Taylor Jr. (incumbent)	3,533	59.2
Republican	James M. Roby	2,431	40.8
Democratic hold			

=== District 2B ===
Maryland House of Delegates District 2B election
Party	Candidate	Votes	%
Democratic	Peter G. Callas (incumbent)	5,339	71.7
Republican	Richard D. Wiles	2,103	28.3
Democratic hold			

=== District 2C ===
Maryland House of Delegates District 2C election
Party	Candidate	Votes	%
Republican	Donald F. Munson (incumbent)	4,303	100.0
Republican hold			

=== District 3A ===
Maryland House of Delegates District 3A election
Party	Candidate	Votes	%
Democratic	Bruce Poole	4,708	50.5
Independent	Paul D. Muldowney (incumbent)	3,073	33.0
Republican	Ronald J. Stansbury	1,545	16.6
Democratic hold			

=== District 3B ===
Maryland House of Delegates District 3B election
Party	Candidate	Votes	%
Democratic	James E. McClellan (incumbent)	9,228	31.7
Democratic	Royd Smith	7,872	27.0
Republican	M. Albert Morningstar (incumbent)	6,509	22.4
Republican	Donald T. Taylor	5,493	18.9
Democratic hold			
Democratic hold			

=== District 4A ===
Maryland House of Delegates District 4A election
Party	Candidate	Votes	%
Democratic	Thomas H. Hattery (incumbent)	9,014	31.7
Democratic	George Littrell (incumbent)	8,391	29.5
Republican	Kenneth R. Coffey	7,954	27.9
Republican	Larry W. Cook	3,113	10.9
Democratic hold			
Democratic hold			

=== District 4B ===
Maryland House of Delegates District 4B election
Party	Candidate	Votes	%
Republican	Donald B. Elliott	5,295	72.4
Democratic	Robert George Fehle Sr.	2,018	27.6
Republican hold			

=== District 5A ===
Maryland House of Delegates District 5A election
Party	Candidate	Votes	%
Republican	Richard C. Matthews (incumbent)	10,669	30.9
Democratic	Richard N. Dixon (incumbent)	10,118	29.3
Democratic	Francis X. Walsh	7,207	20.9
Republican	Jon Buck	6,499	18.8
Democratic hold			
Republican hold			

=== District 5B ===
Maryland House of Delegates District 5B election
Party	Candidate	Votes	%
Democratic	Lawrence A. LaMotte (incumbent)	4,190	100.0
Democratic hold			

=== District 6 ===
Maryland House of Delegates District 6 election
Party	Candidate	Votes	%
Democratic	R. Terry Connelly (incumbent)	13,324	27.8
Democratic	Michael H. Weir (incumbent)	12,862	26.8
Democratic	E. Farrell Maddox	12,387	25.9
Republican	Michael J. Davis	5,052	10.5
Republican	Edward L. Reider	4,282	8.9
Democratic hold			
Democratic hold			
Democratic hold			

=== District 7 ===
Maryland House of Delegates District 7 election
Party	Candidate	Votes	%
Democratic	Robert R. Staab (incumbent)	18,956	30.2
Democratic	John S. Arnick (incumbent)	18,244	29.0
Democratic	Louis L. DePazzo (incumbent)	18,103	28.8
Republican	Walter F. Menear Jr.	3,857	6.1
Republican	Joseph E. Antonelli	3,661	5.8
Democratic hold			
Democratic hold			
Democratic hold			

=== District 8 ===
Maryland House of Delegates District 8 election
Party	Candidate	Votes	%
Democratic	Joseph Bartenfelder (incumbent)	18,245	23.1
Democratic	Donna M. Felling	16,443	20.8
Democratic	William J. Burgess (incumbent)	16,049	20.3
Republican	Scott A. Sewell	11,610	14.7
Republican	Alfred W. Redmer Jr.	10,841	13.7
Republican	Howard C. Harclerode	5,782	7.3
Democratic hold			
Democratic hold			
Democratic hold			

=== District 9 ===
Maryland House of Delegates District 9 election
Party	Candidate	Votes	%
Republican	Martha Scanlan Klima (incumbent)	16,082	19.5
Democratic	Michael U. Gisriel	14,329	17.4
Republican	John J. Bishop	14,004	17.0
Republican	Patrick E. Carter	13,003	15.8
Democratic	Jack R. Sturgill Jr.	12,819	15.5
Democratic	William R. Richardson Jr.	12,291	14.9
Democratic hold			
Republican hold			
Republican gain from Democratic			

=== District 10 ===
Maryland House of Delegates District 10 election
Party	Candidate	Votes	%
Republican	Ellen Sauerbrey (incumbent)	20,653	26.5
Republican	Wade Kach (incumbent)	17,583	22.6
Republican	Bob Ehrlich	16,365	21.0
Democratic	Jay Wachter	13,298	17.1
Democratic	Judith Boone	9,922	12.7
Republican hold			
Republican hold			
Republican hold			

=== District 11 ===
Maryland House of Delegates District 11 election
Party	Candidate	Votes	%
Democratic	Theodore Levin (incumbent)	21,593	32.5
Democratic	Leon Albin	19,096	28.7
Democratic	Richard Rynd	19,032	28.6
Republican	Beverly Eileen Goldstein	6,778	10.2
Democratic hold			
Democratic hold			
Democratic hold			

=== District 12 ===
Maryland House of Delegates District 12 election
Party	Candidate	Votes	%
Democratic	Louis P. Morsberger (incumbent)	18,035	33.8
Democratic	Nancy L. Murphy {incumbent)	17,747	33.2
Democratic	Kenneth H. Masters (incumbent)	17,636	33.0
Democratic hold			
Democratic hold			
Democratic hold			

=== District 13A ===
Maryland House of Delegates District 13A election
Party	Candidate	Votes	%
Democratic	Virginia M. Thomas	6,957	68.3
Republican	Mark E. Percich	3,233	31.7
Democratic hold			

=== District 13B ===
Maryland House of Delegates District 13B election
Party	Candidate	Votes	%
Democratic	Susan R. Buswell (incumbent)	8,163	29.7
Democratic	William C. Bevan (incumbent)	8,049	29.2
Republican	Martin G. Madden	7,527	27.4
Republican	Wayne M. Hammerly	3,779	13.7
Democratic hold			
Democratic hold			

=== District 14A ===
Maryland House of Delegates District 14A election
Party	Candidate	Votes	%
Democratic	Joel Chasnoff (incumbent)	7,390	63.2
Republican	Patricia Anne Faulkner	4,295	36.8
Democratic hold			

=== District 14B ===
Maryland House of Delegates District 14B election
Party	Candidate	Votes	%
Republican	Robert H. Kittleman (incumbent)	14,806	32.3
Republican	Robert Flanagan	11,708	25.5
Democratic	Sue-Ellen Hantman	9,870	21.5
Democratic	E. Alexander Adams	9,445	20.6
Republican hold			
Republican gain from Democratic			

=== District 15 ===
Maryland House of Delegates District 15 election
Party	Candidate	Votes	%
Democratic	Judith C. Toth (incumbent)	19,280	20.6
Republican	Jean Roesser	18,525	19.8
Democratic	Gene W. Counihan (incumbent)	18,104	19.3
Democratic	Sandra E. Bregman	15,475	16.5
Republican	John C. Webb Jr.	11,461	12.2
Republican	Ronald S. Bird	10,795	11.5
Democratic hold			
Republican hold			
Democratic hold			

=== District 16 ===
Maryland House of Delegates District 16 election
Party	Candidate	Votes	%
Democratic	Nancy Kopp (incumbent)	20,823	20.3
Democratic	Gilbert J. Genn	20,570	20.1
Democratic	Brian Frosh	20,145	19.7
Republican	Carol Trawick	13,730	13.4
Republican	William Colliton	13,727	13.4
Republican	John A. Whitney	13,476	13.2
Democratic hold			
Democratic hold			
Democratic hold			

=== District 17 ===
Maryland House of Delegates District 17 election
Party	Candidate	Votes	%
Democratic	Jennie M. Forehand (incumbent)	15,750	25.8
Democratic	Mary H. Boergers (incumbent)	15,562	25.5
Democratic	Michael R. Gordon (incumbent)	14,338	23.4
Republican	Matthew J. Hannon	7,848	12.8
Republican	Mark Allen Skinner	7,649	12.5
Democratic hold			
Democratic hold			
Democratic hold			

=== District 18 ===
Maryland House of Delegates District 18 election
Party	Candidate	Votes	%
Democratic	Patricia R. Sher (incumbent)	17,378	23.5
Democratic	Donald B. Robertson (incumbent)	17,093	23.1
Democratic	C. Lawrence Wiser	16,306	22.0
Republican	Howard Jenkins III	8,004	10.8
Republican	Edgar A. Cadwallader	7,664	10.4
Republican	Randolph B. Titus	7,593	10.3
Democratic hold			
Democratic hold			
Democratic hold			

=== District 19 ===
Maryland House of Delegates District 19 election
Party	Candidate	Votes	%
Democratic	Carol S. Petzold	18,227	21.5
Democratic	Leonard H. Teitelbaum	17,685	20.8
Democratic	Henry B. Heller	17,670	20.8
Republican	Mary Bowen	11,300	13.3
Republican	Kyo R. Jhin	11,075	13.0
Republican	William Jensen	8,974	10.6
Democratic hold			
Democratic hold			
Democratic hold			

=== District 20 ===
Maryland House of Delegates District 20 election
Party	Candidate	Votes	%
Democratic	Peter Franchot	17,596	23.8
Democratic	Dana Lee Dembrow	17,457	23.7
Democratic	Sheila E. Hixson (incumbent)	17,255	23.4
Republican	Stuart T. Eisen	7,483	10.1
Republican	James Gordon Bennett	7,431	10.1
Republican	Ronald T. Richard	6,572	8.9
Democratic hold			
Democratic hold			
Democratic hold			

=== District 21 ===
Maryland House of Delegates District 21 election
Party	Candidate	Votes	%
Democratic	Timothy F. Maloney (incumbent)	12,238	34.6
Democratic	Pauline Menes (incumbent)	11,800	33.4
Democratic	James Rosapepe	11,292	32.0
Democratic hold			
Democratic hold			
Democratic hold			

=== District 22 ===
Maryland House of Delegates District 22 election
Party	Candidate	Votes	%
Democratic	Richard A. Palumbo (incumbent)	11,498	31.8
Democratic	Anne MacKinnon	10,286	28.4
Democratic	Paul G. Pinsky	10,262	28.3
Republican	James J. Krehely	4,158	11.5
Democratic hold			
Democratic hold			
Democratic hold			

=== District 23 ===
Maryland House of Delegates District 23 election
Party	Candidate	Votes	%
Democratic	Joan Breslin Pitkin (incumbent)	16,593	35.0
Democratic	Mary A. Conroy (incumbent)	15,815	33.4
Democratic	Charles J. Ryan Jr. (incumbent)	15,008	31.7
Democratic hold			
Democratic hold			
Democratic hold			

=== District 24 ===
Maryland House of Delegates District 24 election
Party	Candidate	Votes	%
Democratic	Sylvania W. Woods Jr. (incumbent)	10,809	33.5
Democratic	Francis J. Santangelo Sr. (incumbent)	10,797	33.5
Democratic	Nathaniel Exum (incumbent)	10,622	33.0
Democratic hold			
Democratic hold			
Democratic hold			

=== District 25 ===
Maryland House of Delegates District 25 election
Party	Candidate	Votes	%
Democratic	Dennis C. Donaldson (incumbent)	10,806	33.0
Democratic	Juanita Miller	10,180	31.1
Democratic	Ulysses Currie	9,733	29.7
Republican	Bryan K. Swartwood	2,049	6.3
Democratic hold			
Democratic hold			
Democratic hold			

=== District 26 ===
Maryland House of Delegates District 26 election
Party	Candidate	Votes	%
Democratic	Rosa Lee Blumenthal	11,610	28.7
Democratic	Christine M. Jones (incumbent)	10,893	26.9
Democratic	Gloria G. Lawlah (incumbent)	10,308	25.5
Republican	Lyle Delfosse	4,073	10.1
Republican	Lee F. Breuer	3,547	8.8
Democratic hold			
Democratic hold			
Democratic hold			

=== District 27 ===
Maryland House of Delegates District 27 election
Party	Candidate	Votes	%
Democratic	Joseph F. Vallario Jr. (incumbent)	13,750	24.7
Democratic	William R. McCaffrey (incumbent)	13,533	24.3
Democratic	Gary R. Alexander (incumbent)	12,430	22.3
Republican	Francis James DiSalvo	7,892	14.2
Republican	John Gleason	4,350	7.8
Republican	Charles W. Sherren Jr.	3,738	6.7
Independent	Theodore Higier	2	0.0
Democratic hold			
Democratic hold			
Democratic hold			

=== District 28A ===
Maryland House of Delegates District 28A election
Party	Candidate	Votes	%
Democratic	Michael J. Sprague (incumbent)	10,021	50.5
Democratic	Samuel C. Linton (incumbent)	9,817	49.5
Democratic hold			
Democratic hold			

=== District 28B ===
Maryland House of Delegates District 28B election
Party	Candidate	Votes	%
Democratic	John F. Wood Jr.	4,164	72.8
Republican	William Ragsdale	1,559	27.2
Democratic hold			

=== District 29A ===
Maryland House of Delegates District 29A election
Party	Candidate	Votes	%
Democratic	Thomas A. Rymer (incumbent)	5,971	100.0
Democratic hold			

=== District 29B ===
Maryland House of Delegates District 29B election
Party	Candidate	Votes	%
Democratic	J. Ernest Bell II (incumbent)	5,739	72.5
Republican	Dennis M. O'Hara	2,179	27.5
Democratic hold			

=== District 29C ===
Maryland House of Delegates District 29C election
Party	Candidate	Votes	%
Democratic	John F. Slade III (incumbent)	3,696	100.0
Democratic hold			

=== District 30 ===
Maryland House of Delegates District 30 election
Party	Candidate	Votes	%
Democratic	John Astle (incumbent)	16,354	22.5
Democratic	Michael E. Busch	13,858	19.1
Democratic	Donald E. Lamb	12,898	17.8
Republican	John R. Hammond	12,895	17.8
Republican	David Kelley	10,291	14.2
Republican	Frank Bradlyn McClanahan	6,349	8.7
Democratic hold			
Democratic hold			
Democratic hold			

=== District 31 ===
Maryland House of Delegates District 31 election
Party	Candidate	Votes	%
Republican	John R. Leopold (incumbent)	14,586	22.3
Democratic	W. Ray Huff	14,005	21.4
Democratic	Charles W. Kolodziejski (incumbent)	13,050	19.9
Democratic	James J. Riley	12,895	19.7
Republican	Anthony J. Girandola	5,950	9.1
Republican	Charles E. Beatty	4,994	7.6
Republican hold			
Democratic hold			
Democratic hold			

=== District 32 ===
Maryland House of Delegates District 32 election
Party	Candidate	Votes	%
Democratic	Patrick C. Scannello (incumbent)	13,593	29.7
Democratic	George T. Schmincke (incumbent)	12,817	28.0
Democratic	Tyras S. Athey (incumbent)	12,671	27.7
Republican	William W. Kemp	6,634	14.5
Democratic hold			
Democratic hold			
Democratic hold			

=== District 33 ===
Maryland House of Delegates District 33 election
Party	Candidate	Votes	%
Republican	Elizabeth S. Smith (incumbent)	13,091	20.4
Republican	John G. Gary (incumbent)	12,315	19.2
Democratic	Marsha G. Perry	10,476	16.3
Democratic	John Witty	10,272	16.0
Democratic	Bill D. Burlison	9,092	14.2
Republican	Douglas W. Diehl	8,985	14.0
Republican hold			
Republican hold			
Democratic hold			

=== District 34 ===
Maryland House of Delegates District 34 election
Party	Candidate	Votes	%
Democratic	Eileen M. Rehrmann (incumbent)	14,781	25.4
Democratic	Barbara Osborn Kreamer (incumbent)	14,069	24.2
Democratic	William H. Cox Jr. (incumbent)	13,272	22.8
Republican	Michael von Lange	8,266	14.2
Republican	John D. Reynolds	7,720	13.3
Democratic hold			
Democratic hold			
Democratic hold			

=== District 35A ===
Maryland House of Delegates District 35A election
Party	Candidate	Votes	%
Democratic	Joseph Lutz (incumbent)	10,093	31.3
Republican	William A. Clark (incumbent)	8,855	27.5
Republican	Dorothy Polek Stancill	7,736	24.0
Democratic	Edwin E. Hess	5,568	17.3
Republican hold			
Democratic hold			

=== District 35B ===
Maryland House of Delegates District 35B election
Party	Candidate	Votes	%
Democratic	Ethel Ann Murray (incumbent)	3,846	58.5
Republican	Walter Burlin	2,726	41.5
Democratic hold			

=== District 36 ===
Maryland House of Delegates District 36 election
Party	Candidate	Votes	%
Democratic	R. Clayton Mitchell Jr. (incumbent)	14,250	30.8
Democratic	Ronald A. Guns (incumbent)	13,745	29.7
Democratic	John M. Ashley Jr. (incumbent)	11,387	24.6
Republican	Joseph L. Holt	6,953	15.0
Democratic hold			
Democratic hold			
Democratic hold			

=== District 37 ===
Maryland House of Delegates District 37 election
Party	Candidate	Votes	%
Democratic	William S. Horne (incumbent)	13,936	26.7
Democratic	Samuel Q. Johnson III (incumbent)	13,113	25.1
Republican	Richard F. Colburn (incumbent)	12,148	23.3
Democratic	James H. Balderson	7,953	15.2
Republican	Donald Littleton	5,068	9.7
Republican hold			
Democratic hold			
Democratic hold			

=== District 38 ===
Maryland House of Delegates District 38 election
Party	Candidate	Votes	%
Democratic	Daniel M. Long (incumbent)	17,390	31.2
Democratic	Norman Conway	16,872	30.2
Democratic	Mark O. Pilchard (incumbent)	14,998	26.9
Republican	Domnick Brunori	6,552	11.7
Democratic hold			
Democratic hold			
Democratic hold			

=== District 39 ===
Maryland House of Delegates District 39 election
Party	Candidate	Votes	%
Democratic	Larry Young (incumbent)	9,299	35.9
Democratic	Elijah Cummings (incumbent)	8,315	32.1
Democratic	Ruth M. Kirk (incumbent)	8,281	32.0
Democratic hold			
Democratic hold			
Democratic hold			

=== District 40 ===
Maryland House of Delegates District 40 election
Party	Candidate	Votes	%
Democratic	Ralph M. Hughes (incumbent)	11,844	35.7
Democratic	Pete Rawlings (incumbent)	10,716	32.3
Democratic	Tony E. Fulton	10,602	32.0
Democratic hold			
Democratic hold			
Democratic hold			

=== District 41 ===
Maryland House of Delegates District 41 election
Party	Candidate	Votes	%
Democratic	Margaret H. Murphy (incumbent)	13,261	36.7
Democratic	Nathaniel T. Oaks (incumbent)	11,549	31.9
Democratic	Frank Boston	11,343	31.4
Democratic hold			
Democratic hold			
Democratic hold			

=== District 42 ===
Maryland House of Delegates District 42 election
Party	Candidate	Votes	%
Democratic	Samuel I. Rosenberg (incumbent)	16,143	30.3
Democratic	James W. Campbell (incumbent)	16,000	30.0
Democratic	David B. Shapiro	14,978	28.1
Republican	Nicholas B. Fessenden	3,396	6.4
Republican	Ernest B. Gray Sr.	2,750	5.2
Democratic hold			
Democratic hold			
Democratic hold			

=== District 43 ===
Maryland House of Delegates District 43 election
Party	Candidate	Votes	%
Democratic	Gerald Curran (incumbent)	16,909	31.4
Democratic	Ann Marie Doory	16,535	30.7
Democratic	Henry R. Hergenroeder Jr. (incumbent)	16,141	30.0
Republican	Sonny A. Hall	4,303	8.0
Democratic hold			
Democratic hold			
Democratic hold			

=== District 44 ===
Maryland House of Delegates District 44 election
Party	Candidate	Votes	%
Democratic	Anne Scarlet Perkins (incumbent)	14,713	31.9
Democratic	Curt Anderson (incumbent)	14,016	30.4
Democratic	Kenneth C. Montague Jr.	13,866	30.1
Republican	James B. Larrimore	3,468	7.5
Democratic hold			
Democratic hold			
Democratic hold			

=== District 45 ===
Maryland House of Delegates District 45 election
Party	Candidate	Votes	%
Democratic	John W. Douglass (incumbent)	10,256	34.3
Democratic	Hattie N. Harrison (incumbent)	9,933	33.2
Democratic	Clarence "Tiger" Davis (incumbent)	9,713	32.5
Independent	Ronald M. Owens-Bey	7	0.0
Democratic hold			
Democratic hold			
Democratic hold			

=== District 46 ===
Maryland House of Delegates District 46 election
Party	Candidate	Votes	%
Democratic	American Joe Miedusiewski (incumbent)	15,521	33.7
Democratic	Anthony M. DiPietro Jr. (incumbent)	15,467	33.5
Democratic	Cornell N. Dypski	15,119	32.8
Democratic hold			
Democratic hold			
Democratic hold			

=== District 47 ===
Maryland House of Delegates District 47 election
Party	Candidate	Votes	%
Democratic	R. Charles Avara (incumbent)	9,802	33.7
Democratic	Joseph W. O'Malley (incumbent)	9,703	33.3
Democratic	Paul E. Weisengoff (incumbent)	9,596	33.0
Democratic hold			
Democratic hold			
Democratic hold			
