= 1982 Maryland House of Delegates election =

- November 2, 1982

All 141 seats in the Maryland House of Delegates 71 seats needed for a majority
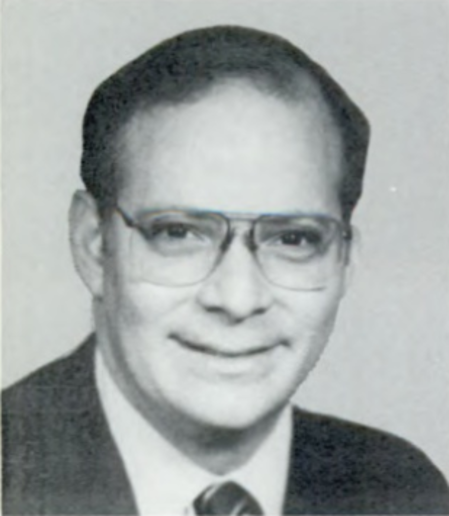

	Majority party	Minority party
Leader	Ben Cardin	Raymond E. Beck (retired)
Party	Democratic	Republican
Leader since	January 6, 1979	1978
Leader's seat	42nd district	5th district
Last election	126	15
Seats won	124	17
Seat change	▼2	▲2
- Results: Democratic gain Republican gain Democratic hold Republican hold
Speaker before election
Ben Cardin
Democratic
Elected Speaker
Ben Cardin
Democratic

The 1982 Maryland House of Delegates elections were held on November 2, 1982, as part of the 1982 United States elections, including the 1982 Maryland gubernatorial election. All 141 of Maryland's state delegates were up for reelection.

Leading up to the 1982 elections, Republicans were hopeful to gain seats in the legislature, citing Lawrence Hogan and Robert A. Pascal leading the party's ticket in the U.S. Senate and gubernatorial elections, and Ronald Reagan's strong performance in the state during the 1980 United States presidential election and subsequent legislative accomplishments. However, the elections provided to be a major setback for the party as they were only able to gain two seats from the Democratic Party, and Hogan and Pascal lost their elections in landslides.

== Results ==
District	Incumbent	Party	District	Elected	Party
1A	DeCorsey E. Bolden	Rep	1A	George C. Edwards	Rep
1B	William B. Byrnes	Dem	1B	William B. Byrnes	Dem
1B	Thomas B. Cumiskey	Dem	1B	W. Timothy Finan	Dem
2A	Casper R. Taylor Jr.	Dem	2A	Casper R. Taylor Jr.	Dem
2B	Irwin F. Hoffman	Dem	2B	Peter G. Callas	Dem
2C	Donald F. Munson	Rep	2C	Donald F. Munson	Rep
3A	Paul D. Muldowney	Dem	3A	Paul D. Muldowney	Dem
3B	Julien P. Delphey	Rep	3B	M. Albert Morningstar	Rep
3B	James E. McClellan	Dem	3B	James E. McClellan	Dem
4A	Charles E. Smith	Dem	4A	Thomas H. Hattery	Dem
4B	Raymond E. Beck	Rep	4A	George H. Littrell Jr.	Dem
4B	V. Lanny Harchenhorn	Rep	4B	V. Lanny Harchenhorn	Rep
5A	William H. Amoss	Dem	5A	Richard N. Dixon	Dem
5B	Richard C. Matthews	Rep	5A	Richard C. Matthews	Rep
5B	Ellen Sauerbrey	Rep	5B	Lawrence A. LaMotte	Dem
6	Richard B. Adams Jr.	Dem	6	Michael J. Collins	Dem
6	William H. Cox Jr.	Dem	6	R. Terry Connelly	Dem
6	Catherine Riley	Dem	6	Michael H. Weir	Dem
7	Michael J. Collins	Dem	7	John S. Arnick	Dem
7	R. Terry Connelly	Dem	7	Louis L. DePazzo	Dem
7	Michael H. Weir	Dem	7	Robert R. Staab	Dem
8	Louis L. DePazzo	Dem	8	Dale Anderson	Dem
8	Daniel J. Minnick	Dem	8	Joseph Bartenfelder	Dem
8	Robert R. Staab	Dem	8	William J. Burgess	Dem
9	Thomas L. Bromwell	Dem	9	Donald K. Hughes	Dem
9	William J. Burgess	Dem	9	Thomas B. Kernan	Dem
9	William Rush	Dem	9	Martha Scanlan Klima	Rep
10	Donald K. Hughes	Dem	10	Thomas W. Chamberlain Sr.	Rep
10	Thomas B. Kernan	Dem	10	Wade Kach	Rep
10	Mark C. Medairy Jr.	Dem	10	Ellen Sauerbrey	Rep
11	Bert Booth	Dem	11	Arthur S. Alperstein	Dem
11	Wade Kach	Rep	11	Paula Hollinger	Dem
11	Thomas W. Chamberlain Sr.	Rep	11	Theodore Levin	Dem
12	Arthur S. Alperstein	Dem	12	Kenneth H. Masters	Dem
12	Paula Hollinger	Dem	12	Louis P. Morsberger	Dem
12	Theodore Levin	Dem	12	Nancy L. Murphy	Dem
13	Charles E. Kountz	Dem	13A	Virginia M. Thomas	Dem
13	Kenneth H. Masters	Dem	13B	William C. Bevan	Dem
13	Louis P. Morsberger	Dem	13B	Susan R. Buswell	Dem
14A	Joel Chasnoff	Dem	14A	Joel Chasnoff	Dem
14B	Anne E. Baker	Dem	14B	Edward J. Kasemeyer	Dem
14B	Hugh Burgess	Dem	14B	Robert H. Kittleman	Rep
15A	Jerry H. Hyatt	Dem	15	Jerry H. Hyatt	Dem
15B	Robin Ficker	Rep	15	Gene W. Counihan	Dem
15B	Judith C. Toth	Dem	15	Judith C. Toth	Dem
16	Marilyn R. Goldwater	Dem	16	Marilyn R. Goldwater	Dem
16	Nancy Kopp	Dem	16	Nancy Kopp	Dem
16	Connie Morella	Rep	16	Connie Morella	Rep
17	Jennie M. Forehand	Dem	17	Jennie M. Forehand	Dem
17	Joseph E. Owens	Dem	17	Mary H. Boergers	Dem
17	Luiz R. S. Simmons	Rep	17	Michael R. Gordon	Dem
18	Mary H. Boergers	Dem	18	Helen L. Koss	Dem
18	Donald B. Robertson	Dem	18	Donald B. Robertson	Dem
18	Patricia R. Sher	Dem	18	Patricia R. Sher	Dem
19	Idamae Garrott	Dem	19	Idamae Garrott	Dem
19	Helen L. Koss	Dem	19	Joseph E. Owens	Dem
19	Lucille Maurer	Dem	19	Lucille Maurer	Dem
20	Steuart Bainum Jr.	Dem	20	Diane Kirchenbauer	Dem
20	Sheila E. Hixson	Dem	20	Sheila E. Hixson	Dem
20	Ida G. Ruben	Dem	20	Ida G. Ruben	Dem
21	Kay G. Binen	Dem	21	Thomas J. Mooney	Dem
21	Timothy F. Maloney	Dem	21	Timothy F. Maloney	Dem
21	Pauline Menes	Dem	21	Pauline Menes	Dem
22	James B. Blackistone	Dem	22	David Bird	Dem
22	Mabel S. Wilkinson	Dem	22	Richard A. Palumbo	Dem
22	Thomas J. Mooney	Dem	22	Frank Pesci	Dem
23	David Bird	Dem	23	Gerard F. Devlin	Dem
23	Frank Pesci	Dem	23	Joan Breslin Pitkin	Dem
23	Robert S. Redding	Dem	23	Charles J. Ryan Jr.	Dem
24	Gerard F. Devlin	Dem	24	Nathaniel Exum	Dem
24	Joan Breslin Pitkin	Dem	24	Francis J. Santangelo Sr.	Dem
24	Charles J. Ryan	Dem	24	Sylvania W. Woods Jr.	Dem
25	Nathaniel Exum	Dem	25	Dennis C. Donaldson	Dem
25	Francis J. Santangelo Sr.	Dem	25	Lorraine Sheehan	Dem
25	Sylvania W. Woods Jr.	Dem	25	Albert Wynn	Dem
26	Dennis C. Donaldson	Dem	26	Christine M. Jones	Dem
26	Lorraine Sheehan	Dem	26	Marian L. Patterson	Dem
26	Francis W. White	Dem	26	Frederick C. Rummage	Dem
27	Charles S. Blumenthal	Dem	27	William R. McCaffrey	Dem
27	Christine M. Jones	Dem	27	Joseph F. Vallario Jr.	Dem
27	Frederick C. Rummage	Dem	27	John W. Wolfgang	Dem
28	William R. McCaffrey	Dem	28A	Samuel C. Linton	Dem
28	Joseph F. Vallario Jr.	Dem	28A	Michael J. Sprague	Dem
28	John W. Wolfgang	Dem	28B	John Knight Parlett	Dem
29	John Knight Parlett	Dem	29A	Thomas A. Rymer	Dem
29	John William Quade Jr.	Dem	29B	J. Ernest Bell II	Dem
29	Michael J. Sprague	Dem	29C	John F. Slade III	Dem
30A	Thomas A. Rymer	Dem	30	John Astle	Dem
30B	Elmer F. Hagner Jr.	Dem	30	Elmer F. Hagner Jr.	Dem
30B	Gerald W. Winegrad	Dem	30	Robert G. Kramer	Dem
31	William J. Burkhead	Dem	31	John R. Leopold	Rep
31	Philip C. Jimeno	Dem	31	Philip C. Jimeno	Dem
31	Walter J. Shandrowsky	Dem	31	Paula A. Long	Dem
32	Tyras S. Athey	Dem	32	Tyras S. Athey	Dem
32	Patrick C. Scannello	Dem	32	Patrick C. Scannello	Dem
32	George T. Schmincke	Dem	32	George T. Schmincke	Dem
33	David G. Boschert	Dem	33	John G. Gary	Rep
33	Robert R. Neall	Rep	33	Robert R. Neall	Rep
33	Elizabeth S. Smith	Rep	33	Elizabeth S. Smith	Rep
34	Carter M. Hickman	Dem	34	William H. Cox Jr.	Rep
34	Richard D. Mackie	Dem	34	Barbara Osborn Kreamer	Dem
34	R. Clayton Mitchell Jr.	Dem	34	Eileen M. Rehrmann	Dem
35	John R. Hargreaves	Dem	35A	William A. Clark	Rep
35	William S. Horne	Dem	35A	Joseph Lutz	Dem
35	William Henry Thomas	Dem	35B	Ethel Ann Murray	Dem
36	Robert Charles Biggy Long	Dem	36	John M. Ashley Jr.	Dem
36	Mark O. Pilchard	Dem	36	Ronald A. Guns	Dem
36	Lewis R. Riley	Rep	36	R. Clayton Mitchell Jr.	Dem
37	R. Charles Avara	Dem	37	Richard F. Colburn	Rep
37	Joseph W. O'Malley	Dem	37	William S. Horne	Dem
37	Paul E. Weisengoff	Dem	37	Samuel Q. Johnson III	Dem
38	Isaiah Dixon Jr.	Dem	38	Daniel M. Long	Dem
38	Lena King Lee	Dem	38	Mark O. Pilchard	Dem
38	Larry Young	Dem	38	Lewis R. Riley	Rep
39	Torrey C. Brown	Dem	39	Elijah Cummings	Dem
39	James W. Campbell	Dem	39	Ruth M. Kirk	Dem
39	Anne Scarlett Perkins	Dem	39	Larry Young	Dem
40	Troy Brailey	Dem	40	Mary B. Adams	Dem
40	Frank M. Conaway Sr.	Dem	40	Ralph M. Hughes	Dem
40	Pete Rawlings	Dem	40	Pete Rawlings	Dem
41	Walter R. Dean Jr.	Dem	41	Nathaniel T. Oaks	Dem
41	Margaret H. Murphy	Dem	41	Margaret H. Murphy	Dem
41	Wendell H. Phillips	Dem	41	Wendell H. Phillips	Dem
42	Ben Cardin	Dem	42	Ben Cardin	Dem
42	David B. Shapiro	Dem	42	James W. Campbell	Dem
42	Steven V. Sklar	Dem	42	Samuel I. Rosenberg	Dem
43	Andrew J. Burns Jr.	Dem	43	Gerald Curran	Dem
43	Henry R. Hergenroeder Jr.	Dem	43	Henry R. Hergenroeder Jr.	Dem
43	John A. Pica Jr.	Dem	43	Charles Bucky Muth	Dem
44	Gerald Curran	Dem	44	Curt Anderson	Dem
44	Dennis C. McCoy	Dem	44	Dennis C. McCoy	Dem
44	Frank C. Robey Jr.	Dem	44	Anne Scarlett Perkins	Dem
45	Joseph A. Chester Sr.	Dem	45	Clarence Davis	Dem
45	John W. Douglass	Dem	45	John W. Douglass	Dem
45	Hattie N. Harrison	Dem	45	Hattie N. Harrison	Dem
46	Louis V. Cavallaro	Dem	46	Raymond A. Dypski	Dem
46	Anthony M. DiPietro Jr.	Dem	46	Anthony M. DiPietro Jr.	Dem
46	Pat McDonough	Dem	46	American Joe Miedusiewski	Dem
47	James R. Dietrich	Dem	47	R. Charles Avara	Dem
47	Raymond A. Dypski	Dem	47	Joseph W. O'Malley	Dem
47	American Joe Miedusiewski	Dem	47	Paul E. Weisengoff	Dem
