= John W. Douglass (politician) =

American politician (born 1942)

Member of the Maryland House of Delegates from the 45th district
- In office January 13, 1971 – January 11, 1995 Serving with Hattie Harrison, Clarence "Tiger" Davis, Joseph A. Chester, Sr., Floyd B. Adams, and James A. Scott, Jr.
- Preceded by: Walter Orlinsky
- Succeeded by: Talmadge Branch

Personal details
- Born: March 19, 1942 (age 84) Princess Anne, Maryland
- Party: Democratic

John W. Douglass (born March 19, 1942) is an American former politician in the state of Maryland. He served in the Maryland House of Delegates as a Democrat from the 45th district from 1971 to 1995 during which time he resided in Baltimore. He did not run for re-election in 1994.

== Early life and career ==
Douglass was born in Princess Anne, Maryland on March 19, 1942. He attended Lincoln University, where he earned an A.B. degree cum laude in 1964, and Johns Hopkins University, where he earned a M.A. degree in 1966. After graduating, he worked as a clerk to the Baltimore City Council from 1967 to 1968.

After retiring from the Maryland House of Delegates, Douglass worked as the Deputy Director for the State Department of Assessments and Taxation.

== In the legislature ==
Douglass was sworn into the Maryland House of Delegates in 1971.

In 1977, Douglass testified against a proposal to convert an old Baltimore factory into a medium security prison to relieve severe overcrowding in the state's prisons, saying that he opposed the location of the prison because of the secretive nature of the negotiations and the threat it posed to nearby communities.

In 1985, Douglass voted to kill a proposal made by Governor Harry Hughes that would ease the state's restrictions on the public funding of abortions. He also voted to kill legislation that would limit the amount that political action committees could contribute to political campaigns.

=== Committee assignments ===
- Member, Appropriations Committee, 1971–1992, 1994
  - Capital Budget Subcommittee
  - Human Resources and Public Safety Subcommittee
- Member, Special Joint Committee on Legislative Data Systems, Joint Expenditure Study Group on Education and Human Resources
- House chair, Joint Budget and Audit Committee, 1976–1988
- Member, Spending Affordability Committee, 1982–1988

== Run for state comptroller ==
In 1975, Douglass unsuccessfully ran for Comptroller of Maryland. He ran again in 1979, again being defeated in the Democratic primary. In 1983, shortly after Hyman A. Pressman announced he would seek another term as Comptroller, Douglass declared that he would again run for Comptroller.

== Run for state treasurer ==
In 1987, Douglass applied become the next Maryland State Treasurer, but withdrew his candidacy after forming a coalition with Lucille Maurer, who agreed to appoint Douglass as her chief deputy treasurer in exchange for the Legislative Black Caucus of Maryland's votes.

In 1995, Douglass again ran for State Treasurer against Lucille Maurer. He received the support of 45 of the state's delegates and senators, but lost the election to Maurer.

In 2002, Douglass again for State Treasurer following the retirement of Richard N. Dixon.

In November 2021, Douglass applied become the next Maryland State Treasurer following the retirement of Nancy Kopp on December 17, 2021. Delegate Dereck E. Davis was elected State Treasurer on December 9, 2021.
