= Clayton Mitchell =

Clayton Mitchell may refer to:

- Clayton Mitchell (Australian politician) (1900–1988), Country Party member in the Western Australian Legislative Assembly
- Clayton Mitchell (New Zealand politician), elected to Parliament at the 2014 general election as a representative of New Zealand First
- R. Clayton Mitchell, Jr. (born 1936), former American politician and the former Speaker of the Maryland House of Delegates
