= Charles Ryan =

Charles Ryan may refer to:

- Sir Charles Lister Ryan (1831–1920), English civil servant
- Sir Charles Ryan (surgeon) (1853–1926), Australian surgeon and army officer
- Charles Ryan (mayor) (1927–2021), American politician and mayor of Springfield, Massachusetts
- Charles Ryan (game designer), American game designer of role-playing games
- Charles Ryan (footballer), English footballer
- Charles J. Ryan Jr. (1936–1994), American politician in Maryland
- Charlie Ryan (1915–2008), American country music and rockabilly singer and songwriter
