= Charles F. Wagaman Jr. =

American politician (born 1942)

Member of the Maryland House of Delegates from the 3A district
- In office 1975–1978
- Preceded by: district established
- Succeeded by: Paul D. Muldowney

Member of the Maryland House of Delegates
- In office 1971–1974
- Preceded by: William L. Donaldson
- Succeeded by: districts established
- Constituency: Washington County

Personal details
- Born: February 20, 1942 (age 84) Hagerstown, Maryland, U.S.
- Party: Republican
- Education: Tufts University (B.S.); University of Maryland School of Law (LL.B.)

Charles F. Wagaman Jr. (born February 20, 1942) is an American politician. He was a member of the Maryland House of Delegates, representing District 3A from 1979 to 1986.

== Early life ==
Charles F. Wagaman Jr. was born on February 20, 1942, in Hagerstown, Maryland. He attended public schools in Hagerstown and The Hill School in Pottstown, Pennsylvania. Wagaman graduated with a Bachelor of Science from Tufts University in 1965 and a Bachelor of Laws degree from University of Maryland School of Law in 1968. He was admitted to the bar in Maryland in 1968.

== Career ==
Wagaman served as a member of the Maryland House of Delegates, representing Washington County, Maryland from 1971 to 1974. He then represented District 3A from 1975 to 1978. He was elected as a Republican.

== Personal life ==
Wagaman is married.
