= Nancy Kopp =

American politician (born 1943)

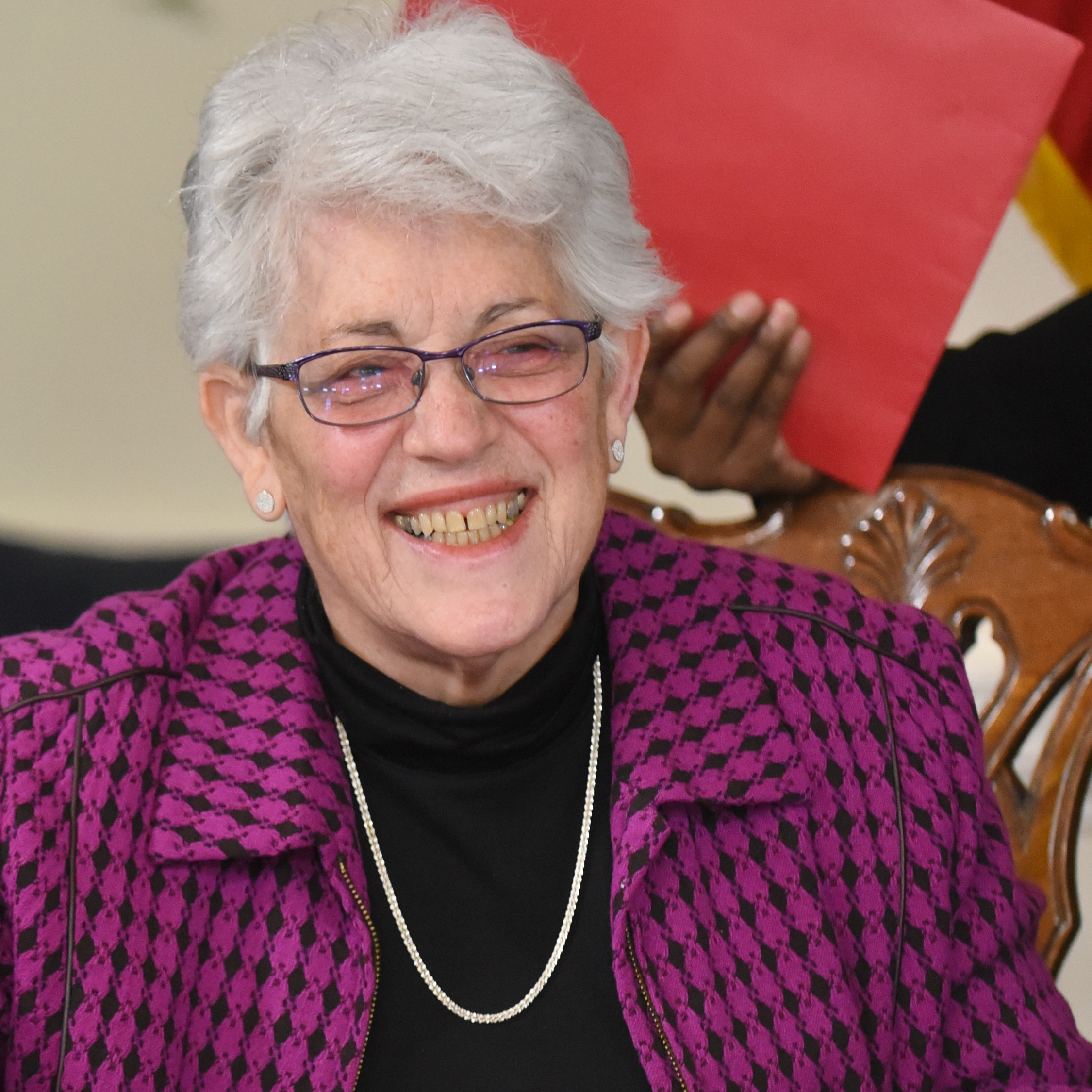
- Kopp in 2021

23rd Treasurer of Maryland
- In office February 5, 2002 – December 17, 2021
- Governor: Parris Glendening; Bob Ehrlich; Martin O'Malley; Larry Hogan
- Preceded by: Richard N. Dixon
- Succeeded by: Dereck E. Davis

Member of the Maryland House of Delegates from the 16th district
- In office January 8, 1975 – February 14, 2002
- Succeeded by: Susan C. Lee

Personal details
- Born: Nancy K. Kopp; December 7, 1943 (age 82) Coral Gables, Florida, U.S.
- Party: Democratic
- Spouse: Robert Kopp (m. 1969)
- Children: 2
- Education: Wellesley College (BA); University of Chicago (MA)

Nancy K. Kopp (born December 7, 1943) is an American politician who served as the Treasurer of Maryland from 2002 to 2021. A Democrat, she was a member of the Maryland House of Delegates, representing the 16th legislative district in Montgomery County, from 1975 to 2002.

== Early life and education ==
Kopp was born on December 7, 1943 in Coral Gables, Florida.

She attended Wellesley College, where she received a Bachelor of Arts degree in 1965. In 1967 she graduated from the University of Chicago with a Master of Arts degree in government & public administration. She completed coursework and preliminary exams for a PhD degree in political philosophy though did not complete her dissertation, which was to have focused on Bernard Mandeville's The Fable of the Bees.

Kopp also has honorary degrees from University of Maryland, Baltimore, the University of Maryland University College, Towson University, and Hood College. Additionally, she is a Sarah T. Hughes Fellow from Goucher College and a Yale Gordon Public Affairs Fellow from the University of Baltimore.

== Political career ==
After five years working on the staff of U.S. Representative Edith Green (Oregon), Kopp took a staff job with Montgomery County's delegation to the state legislature. In 1974, Kopp was elected at the age of 31 to the first of seven four-year terms in the Maryland House of Delegates. In 1976, she became the first sitting state legislator in the United States to give birth while in office. Kopp's work as a delegate focused on education and budgets, along with audits, pensions, human services, consumer protection, housing, privacy, and good government. She was one of the first two women ever appointed to the House Appropriations Committee. Over her time as a delegate, Kopp chaired the Joint Committee on Spending Affordability, as well as the Appropriations Subcommittee on Education and Economic Development. She also served on the Capital Budget Subcommittee, Subcommittee on Pensions, and Joint Committee on Budget and Audits, and, at various times, as Deputy Majority Leader and Speaker Pro Tem. During her legislative career, Treasurer Kopp was named by her colleagues as the most effective woman legislator and one of the 10 most effective members of the House. In late 1992, while serving as Speaker Pro Tem, she led a failed attempt to remove Clayton Mitchell from his role as Maryland's speaker of the house.

Appointed by Maryland's General Assembly, Kopp became the state treasurer in 2002, the second woman to serve in the position, as Lucille Maurer held the position from 1987 to 1996. A bipartisan panel recommended in mid-February 2019 that Kopp keep the job, besting two other applicants who each earned single votes. A week later, the state's lawmakers re-elected Kopp to a fifth four-year term.

In 2014, Kopp argued against Governor Martin O'Malley's plan to divert $100 million – one-third of a planned payment to the state's retirement system – toward other budget needs. Kopp said the change in payment, pledged by 2011 legislation, was the wrong choice and would be costly to state workers and taxpayers. The Maryland Senate later chose to cut two-thirds from the pledged amount, adding $100 million to the pension that year, with plans for increased payments in future years.

On October 18, 2021, she announced her intention to retire as Treasurer. She was succeeded by Dereck E. Davis, who was sworn in on December 17, 2021.

=== Construction of toll lanes on I-270 and I-495 Beltway ===
Kopp is one of three members of the Maryland State Board of Public Works (with Comptroller Franchot and Governor Hogan) who decided whether to approve the governor's plan to expand Interstate Highways I-495 ("the Beltway") and I-270. The plan implements toll lanes on the Capital Beltway where it passes through Maryland and had support in 2019 from 60% of residents of the Washington area, although in the same poll, respondents also expressed concern about home seizures, pollution and increasing traffic from the plan.

Kopp had not publicly announced beforehand how she intended to vote on Governor Hogan's proposal, though she was described as an "avowed skeptic" of the plan. On June 5, 2019, Kopp's was the opposing vote in a 2–1 approval of Hogan's plan to solicit private companies to build and operate toll lanes, on I-270 first and then the beltway.

=== Post-treasurer career ===
In April 2023, Kopp was appointed to the Board of Visitors for the University of Maryland Center for Environmental Science.

Political offices
Preceded by Richard N. Dixon	Treasurer of Maryland; 2002–2021	Succeeded by Dereck E. Davis
