= Thomas J. Shryock =

American businessman and politician (1851–1918)

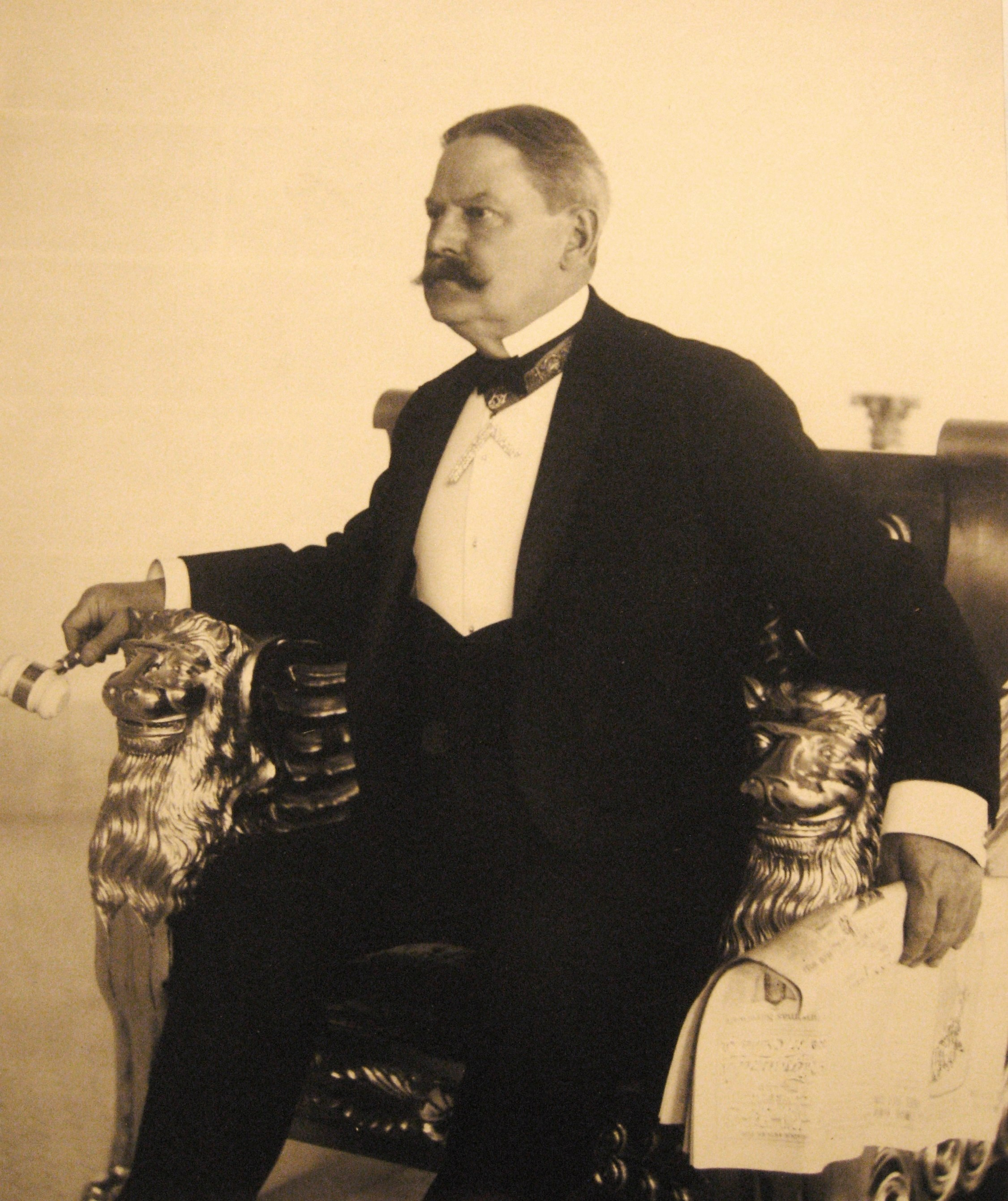

Treasurer of Maryland
- In office 1896–1900
- Preceded by: Spencer Cone Jones
- Succeeded by: Murray Vandiver

Grand Master of the Grand Lodge of Maryland
- In office 1885–1918

Personal details
- Born: February 27, 1851 Baltimore, Maryland, U.S.
- Died: February 3, 1918 (aged 66) Baltimore, Maryland, U.S.
- Resting place: Lorraine Cemetery
- Party: Republican
- Spouses: Maria Eliza Heckman Mann (m. 1869) Catherine Bell Miller (m. 1887)
- Children: 8

Thomas Jacob Shryock (February 27, 1851 – February 3, 1918) was an American businessman and Republican politician from Maryland. He served as Treasurer of Maryland from 1896 to 1900 and as Grand Master of the Grand Lodge of Maryland from 1885 until his death.

== Early life and education ==
Shryock was born in Baltimore on February 27, 1851, to Henry S. Shryock, a cabinetmaker, and Ann Ophelia Shields, daughter of Thomas Shields of Virginia. He was a great-grandson of Henry Shryock, a member of the Maryland legislature in 1788–1789. He attended the public schools of Baltimore and the Light Street Institute.

== Career ==
At age 16, Shryock became a partner with his brother in the lumber firm W. H. Shryock & Co. He operated the business as sole proprietor from 1872 to 1880, when he founded Thomas J. Shryock & Co., of which he was president until his death. Shryock was also president of the St. Lawrence Broom and Manufacturing Company of West Virginia and a director of the Consolidated Gas and Electric Company and the Chesapeake and Potomac Telephone Company.

Shryock was elected Treasurer of Maryland and served from 1896 to 1900, succeeding Spencer Cone Jones; he was succeeded by Murray Vandiver. He served as treasurer of the Republican State Central Committee in 1897 and as its chairman in 1899. Under Governor Lloyd Lowndes, he served as chief of staff with the rank of brigadier general. He was also vice president of the boards of the State Insane Asylum and the Maryland House of Correction.

Shryock was Grand Master of the Grand Lodge of Maryland from 1885 until his death in 1918, a tenure of 32 years.

Shryock was president of the George Washington Masonic National Memorial Association at the time of his death.

== Personal life and death ==
Shryock married Maria Eliza Heckman Mann in 1869 and they had five children. After her death he married Catherine Bell Miller in 1887 and they had three children, including Thomas J. Shryock Jr. (c. 1895–1953).

Shryock died of pneumonia at his home on Madison Avenue in Baltimore on February 3, 1918, and was buried in Lorraine Cemetery.
