= William L. Donaldson =

American politician (1899–1977)

Member of Maryland House of Delegates
- In office 1967–1970
- Preceded by: Mildred C. Huyett, R. Noel Spence, George W. Tingle
- Succeeded by: Charles F. Wagaman Jr.
- Constituency: Washington County

Personal details
- Born: November 8, 1899 Fairfield, Pennsylvania, U.S.
- Died: April 30, 1977 (aged 77) Hagerstown, Maryland, U.S.
- Resting place: Fairfield Union Cemetery
- Party: Republican
- Spouse: Helen E. Eigenbrode
- Children: 1
- Education: Gettysburg College (A.B., M.S.)
- Occupation: Politician; educator

William L. Donaldson (November 8, 1899 – April 30, 1977) was an American politician and educator. He was a member of the Maryland House of Delegates, representing Washington County, Maryland from 1967 to 1970.

== Early life ==
William L. Donaldson was born on November 8, 1899, in Fairfield, Pennsylvania to William C. and Francis Scott Donaldson. He attended public schools in Fairfield and Gettysburg Academy. Wagaman graduated with a Bachelor of Arts and a Master of Science from Gettysburg College in 1924.

== Career ==
Donaldson worked as an educator. He developed an educational survey of Nigeria for the United States government. Donaldson served in the Maryland House of Delegates, representing Washington County, Maryland, from 1967 to 1970. He was elected as a Republican.

== Personal life ==
Donaldson married Helen E. Eigenbrode. They had one son, William C. Donaldson.

Donaldson died on April 30, 1977, at Washington County Hospital in Hagerstown, Maryland. He was buried at Fairfield Union Cemetery.
