= Carol S. Petzold =

American politician

Carol Stoker Petzold is an American politician who served as a member of the Maryland House of Delegates, representing the 19th district in Montgomery County, Maryland, from 1987 to 2007.

== Biography ==
Petzold was born in St. Louis, Missouri. She attended Valparaiso University, earning a Bachelor of Science degree in education (1959). Petzold began her teaching career in Alameda, California. She taught for one year in their public school system (1959) and then moved to Maryland and taught at Montgomery County Public Schools (1960-1962).

Her political career began as a legislative assistant to Senator Lawrence Wiser (1975-1978) and then to Representative Helen Koss (1979-1980). From 1980 to 1981, Petzold was the legislative assistant representing the Montgomery County Board of Education in Annapolis. From 1981 to 1986, Petzold served as the Community School Coordinator for the Montgomery County InterAgency.

On January 14, 1987, Petzold became a Maryland State Delegate for the 19th District of Montgomery County. Petzold was a Democratic delegate. During her time in the House of Delegates, she was active on issues of drug and alcohol abuse, civil rights, fair housing, education, health care, and transportation. She served on many committees during her time in office, including the Judiciary Committee (1992-2007), and chaired the Special Committee on Drug and Alcohol Abuse (2006-2007). Petzold was the president of the Women's Legislative Network from 2004 to 2005. Petzold ended her career as state delegate on January 10, 2007.

== Personal life ==
Petzold is married to Walter J. Petzold. They have three children.
