= Spencer C. Jones =

American politician

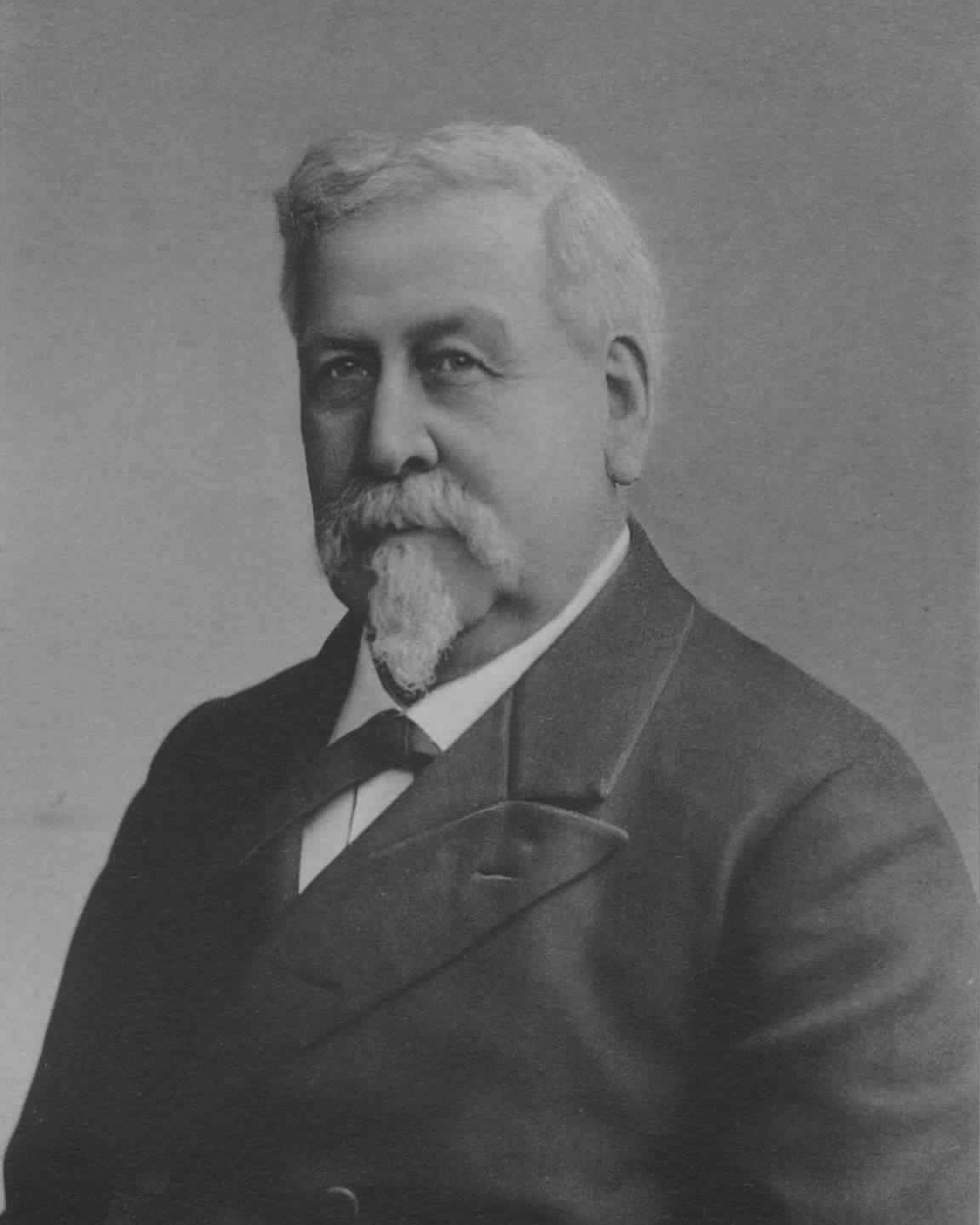
- Portrait, c. 1903

65th President of the Maryland Senate
- In office January 6, 1904 – November 7, 1905
- Preceded by: John Hubner
- Succeeded by: Joseph B. Seth

Member of the Maryland Senate from Montgomery County
- In office November 5, 1901 – November 7, 1905
- Preceded by: William V. Bouic
- Succeeded by: Blair Lee

8th Mayor of Rockville
- In office May 1898 – November 4, 1901
- Preceded by: Joseph Reading
- Succeeded by: Hattersley W. Talbott

11th Treasurer of Maryland
- In office February 16, 1892 – March 11, 1896
- Governor: Frank Brown; Lloyd Lowndes Jr.
- Preceded by: Edwin H. Brown
- Succeeded by: Thomas J. Shryock

Personal details
- Born: Spencer Cone Jones; July 3, 1836 Rockville, Maryland, U.S.
- Died: April 1, 1915 (aged 78) New Orleans, Louisiana, U.S.
- Resting place: Mount Olivet Cemetery
- Party: Democratic
- Spouse: Ellen Brewer (m. 1871; died 1876)
- Children: 1
- Occupation: Lawyer; banker; politician

Military service
- Allegiance: Confederate States
- Branch/service: Confederate States Army
- Rank: Private
- Unit: 1st Maryland Cavalry
- Battles/wars: American Civil War (POW)

Spencer Cone Jones (July 3, 1836 – April 1, 1915), was the President of the Maryland State Senate, Mayor of Rockville, Maryland and Maryland State Treasurer.

== Early life ==
Spencer Cone Jones was born in Rockville, Maryland on July 3, 1836, the son of Reverend Joseph H. Jones (1798–1871), a Baptist minister, and Elizabeth (Clagett) Jones, of Montgomery County. He attended Rockville Academy, Frederick County public schools and Frederick College. After entering the legal profession, Jones practiced with William J. Ross of Frederick, and was admitted to the Frederick County bar in 1860.

== Civil War ==
Jones enlisted in Company D of the First Maryland Cavalry of the Confederate Army at the beginning of the American Civil War. In May 1862, he was thrown in jail for eight months. Jones was first arrested as a prisoner of war and was thrown in the Baltimore City Jail. He was subsequently transferred between Fort McHenry and Fort Delaware for interrogation. He was listed both as a political prisoner and as a prisoner of war. Jones was released from Fort McHenry on December 16, 1863. In February 1864, Jones was indicted in Frederick County Circuit Court for levying war and was disbarred by the Frederick County Court in 1865. The charges were dropped in March 1866. After the war, Jones taught school near Huntsville, Texas, and returned to Maryland after the adoption of the state constitution of 1867. Jones continued to be influential among many former Confederates, speaking at meetings of war veterans, including the dedication of a memorial to the Confederate dead in Winchester, Virginia.

== Professional life ==
Jones returned to Maryland in 1868 established a law practice in Rockville, Maryland. On December 21, 1871, he married Ellen Brewer, daughter of John and Elizabeth Stewart (Buchanan) Brewer. On January 31, 1875, Ellen Jones gave birth to a daughter, Elizabeth, who later married Thomas R. Falvy of New Orleans, Louisiana. Mrs. Jones died on July 21, 1876.

A Democrat, Jones was elected State's Attorney of Montgomery County in 1871 and re-elected in 1875. He also served as clerk of the Maryland Court of Appeals, from 1879 to 1891. During this period, Jones was often appointed to serve as a Trustee in equity cases that were heard before the Montgomery County Circuit Court. He also rose to a high position within the Maryland Democratic Party, speaking frequently at state party conventions, as well as Democratic parties and rallies. The Maryland legislature elected him Treasurer of the State of Maryland in 1892. He was re-elected in 1894, but lost the 1896 election due to a Republican majority in the Maryland General Assembly. Jones was considered several times for the Democratic Party nomination for Governor of Maryland. In 1895, Jones' nomination was thought likely, but his ambitions were thwarted when Arthur P. Gorman threw his support to a Mr. Hurst. He was subsequently elected Mayor of Rockville in 1898 and again in 1900. He resigned in 1901 upon being elected to the state Senate. During the session of 1902 he was chairman of the Finance Committee, and in 1904 he was elected president of the Maryland Senate.

== Maryland State House ==
Jones took a leadership role in the construction of the State House Annex at the beginning of the twentieth century. As a state senator, Jones served on the Executive Committee of the State House Building Commission. On the Building Commission, he frequently participated in meetings regarding the funding and contracts for the State House refurbishment and construction of the State House Annex. In August 1902, the Baltimore Sun reported that the idea for the Annex was Jones' and that he submitted the appropriations bill to fund the restoration and construction. Jones' original bill requested $400,000, but at the request of the Governor and Treasury officials, he changed his request to $250,000, with the understanding that any additional money would be provided during the next legislative session. Jones was elected President of the State Senate on January 4, 1904, and gave a speech that emphasized the importance of completing construction on the State House: "So with the sunshine of prosperity, honor and usefulness upon us should we hesitate to make this house a beautiful, lasting and appropriate expression of our gratitude for, and pride in, the achievements of our people? It is with sadness that we are compelled by the necessities of the situation to vacate the old Senate Chamber, memorable in the history of the State, and in which cluster associations which strike a tender chord in the heart of every true Marylander. Let us have if restored as near as, possible to its original condition and sacredly preserve it as the holiest of all in this temple of our liberties," (Archives of Maryland, Vol. 401, pp. 10). A major focus of Jones' speech was that the Legislature should provide the necessary funding to complete the work on the State House and that such work must maintain the original character of the building.

== End of career, personal associations, death ==
Jones' term in the Senate ended with his defeat in a primary by Blair Lee in 1905. In addition to his legal practice and his political career, Jones was the director, and later president, of the Montgomery County National Bank of Rockville. Jones was a Mason and Knight of Pythias, with whom he held high offices. He also served as vice president of the Board of Visitors of the State School for the Deaf in Frederick, Maryland. Jones died April 1, 1915, in New Orleans, at the home of his daughter, Elizabeth, and son-in-law, Thomas R. Falvy. His body was brought back to Frederick and buried with his wife, Ellen.

Political offices
Preceded by Edwin Brown	Treasurer of Maryland; 1892–1896	Succeeded by Thomas J. Shryock
