= Treasurer of Maryland =

State executive position and office in the Maryland state government

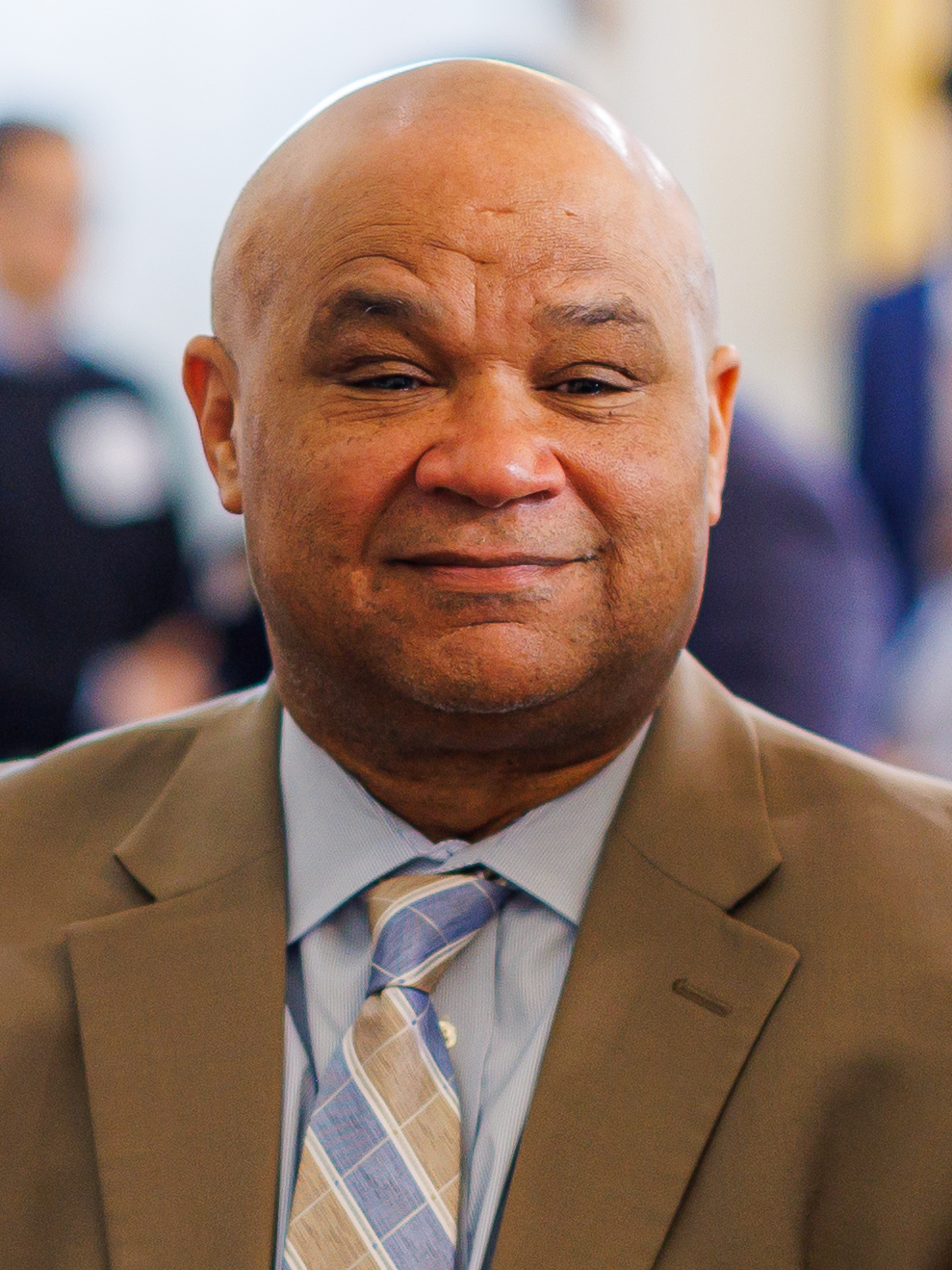
- Incumbent; Dereck E. Davis since 2021
- Formation: 1775
- Website: www.treasurer.state.md.us

The Treasurer of Maryland is responsible for the management and investment of the cash deposits, bond sale revenue, and all other securities and collateral of the state of Maryland in the United States. In addition, the Treasurer conducts regular briefings for the Maryland General Assembly and prepares an annual report on the status of the Treasurer's Office. The Treasurer also sits on the Maryland Board of Public Works. Since 2021, the Treasurer of Maryland has been Dereck E. Davis.

From 1775 until 1843, Maryland had a separate state treasurer for both the eastern and western shores. In 1843, the office of the Treasurer of the Eastern Shore was abolished, and the Treasurer of the Western Shore assumed responsibility for both sides of the Chesapeake Bay. The position was renamed in 1852 to account for its statewide coverage. Since the Maryland Constitution of 1851, the Treasurer has been elected by both houses of the Maryland General Assembly. The term length of treasurers was initially two years, but was increased to four years in 1922.

== Treasurers of Maryland 1775 to 1852 ==
The following is a chronological list of the Treasurers of Maryland. There were initially separate treasurers for each shore of the state.

=== Treasurers of the Eastern Shore of Maryland ===
Image	Treasurer	Term
	William Hindman	1775–1777
	James Hindman	1777–1778
	Edward Hindman	1778–1779
	Henry Dickinson	1779–1789
	William Richardson	1789–1802
	William Chambers	1802–1813
	William Richardson	1813–1825
	John K. B. Emory	1825–1826
	William Lambdin	1826–1840
	Perry Robinson	1840–1841
	John H. Harris	1841–1842
	Perry Robinson	1842–1843

=== Treasurers of the Western Shore of Maryland ===
Image	Treasurer	Term
	Thomas Harwood	1775–1804
	Benjamin Harwood	1804–1826
	George Mackubin	1826–1843
	James S. Owens	1843–1844
	Dennis Claude	1844–1852

== Treasurers of Maryland 1852 to present ==
Image	Treasurer	Term
	James S. Owens	1852–1854
	Dennis Claude	1854–1860
	Sprigg Harwood	1860–1862
	Robert Fowler	1862–1870
	John Merryman	1870–1872
	John W. Davis	1872–1874
	Barnes Compton	1874–1885
	John Sterett Gittings	1885–1886
	Stevenson Archer	1886–1890
	Edwin Brown	1890–1892
	Spencer Cone Jones	1892–1896
	Thomas J. Shryock	1896–1900
	Murray Vandiver	1900–1916
	John M. Dennis	1916–1918
	William P. Jackson	1918–1920
	John M. Dennis	1920–1935
	Hooper Miles	1935–1963
	John Luetkemeyer	1963–1973
	J. Millard Tawes	1973–1975
	William S. James	1975–1987
	Lucille Maurer	1987–1996
	Richard N. Dixon	1996–2002
	Nancy K. Kopp	2002–2021
	Dereck E. Davis	2021–present

== See also ==
- Comptroller of Maryland (Chief Financial Officer)
