= Dennis C. Donaldson =

American politician (1938–2024)

Member of the Maryland House of Delegates
- In office January 10, 1979 – January 16, 1991 Serving with Francis W. White (1979–1983), Lorraine Sheehan (1979–1983), Albert Wynn (1983–1987), Jerry E. Perry (1983–1987), Ulysses Currie (1987–1991) and Juanita Miller (1987–1991)
- Constituency: 26th district (1979–1983), 25th district (1983–1991)

Personal details
- Born: June 9, 1938 Washington, D.C., U.S.
- Died: October 11, 2024 (aged 86) Melbourne, Florida, U.S.
- Party: Democratic

Dennis Clifton Donaldson (June 9, 1938 – October 11, 2024) was an American politician from the state of Maryland. Born in Washington, D.C., he served in the U.S. Air Force from 1960 to 1966. He served as a Democratic member of the Maryland House of Delegates, representing Prince George's County-based district 26 from 1979 to 1983 and district 25 from 1983 to 1991, serving as speaker pro tempore for the final two years.

Donaldson considered a primary challenge against Congressman Roy Dyson in the 1990 cycle, receiving the endorsement of state house speaker R. Clayton Mitchell Jr., but declined to run, citing a lack of funds. He did not seek re-election that year, having accepted a position as a liaison between the Maryland Department of Transportation and the state legislature. He ran for a Maryland Senate seat on the lower Eastern Shore in 1994, losing to incumbent Republican J. Lowell Stoltzfus. He later worked as a political consultant, founding his own company, Donaldson Consultants. He died in Melbourne, Florida on October 11, 2024, at the age of 86.

== Electoral history ==
=== 1978 ===
Maryland House of Delegates, District 26, 1978 election * denotes incumbent Source:
Party	Candidate	Votes	%
Democratic	Francis W. White	6,974	27.4
Democratic	Dennis C. Donaldson	6,603	25.9
Democratic	Lorraine Sheehan*	6,100	23.9
Republican	John Simpson	3,947	15.5
Republican	Joseph A. Finlayson Jr.	1,866	7.3
Total votes		25,490	100

=== 1982 ===
Maryland House of Delegates, District 25, 1982 election * denotes incumbent Source:
Party	Candidate	Votes	%
Democratic	Lorraine Sheehan*	11,966	32.4
Democratic	Albert Wynn	11,318	30.7
Democratic	Dennis C. Donaldson*	11,265	30.5
Republican	Joseph A. Finlayson Jr.	2,353	6.4
Total votes		36,902	100

=== 1986 ===
Maryland House of Delegates, District 25, 1986 election * denotes incumbent Source:
Party	Candidate	Votes	%
Democratic	Dennis C. Donaldson*	10,806	33.0
Democratic	Juanita Miller	10,180	31.1
Democratic	Ulysses Currie	9,733	29.7
Republican	Bryan K. Swartwood	2,049	6.3
Total votes		32,768	100

=== 1994 ===
Maryland Senate, District 38, 1994 election * denotes incumbent Source:
Party	Candidate	Votes	%
Republican	J. Lowell Stoltzfus*	21,783	66.9
Democratic	Dennis C. Donaldson	10,794	33.1
Total votes		32,577	100
