= William Henry Thomas =

American politician (1920–2009)

Member of the Maryland House of Delegates from the 35 district
- In office 1974–1982 Serving with John R. Hargreaves and William S. Horne
- Preceded by: New district
- Succeeded by: District changed
- Constituency: Upper Eastern Shore of Maryland

Personal details
- Born: September 19, 1920 Hudson, Maryland, U.S.
- Died: March 3, 2009 (aged 88) Cambridge, Maryland, U.S.
- Resting place: Veterans Cemetery of the Eastern Shore; Hurlock, Maryland, U.S.
- Party: Democratic
- Spouse(s): Estella Adler (died 1994) Frances Louise Phillips Mills (m. 1995)
- Children: 1
- Occupation: Politician; businessman; farmer

William Henry Thomas (September 19, 1920 – March 3, 2009) was a delegate in the Maryland House of Delegates representing District 35, which covered Dorchester, Talbot, and Wicomico Counties.

== Early life ==
William Henry Thomas was born on September 19, 1920, in Hudson, Maryland, to Estelle (née Marshall) and Carroll Wesley Thomas. He attended school in Hudson and graduated from Cambridge High School.

== Career ==
Thomas, his father and brother Mace formed Carroll W. Thomas & Sons Inc. He enlisted in United States Army Air Corps He served during World War II. In March 1943 he was commissioned as a second lieutenant. As a pilot, he flew more than 47 missions in Europe and was awarded the Distinguished Flying Cross. On October 3, 1945, he was honorably discharged as a captain. In 1945, he expanded the family business on Trenton Street in Cambridge. The business engaged in farm supplies and equipment sales. In the late 1960s, he engaged in farming and bought two farms, one on Egypt Road and one in Linkwood.

Thomas was county commissioner of Dorchester County from 1970 to 1974. Thomas was a Democrat. He served in the Maryland House of Delegates, representing Caroline, Dorchester, Talbot and Wicomico counties, from 1975 to 1982.

He was the director of the Dorchester General Hospital from 1970 to 1971. He was a member of the Farm Bureau, American Legion and Veterans of Foreign Wars. He was president of the Cambridge Rotary Club in 1974, commodore of the Cambridge Yacht Club in 1969 and a board member of Grace Methodist Church.

== Personal life ==
Thomas married Estella Adler on September 10, 1945. They had one son, Edward C. His wife died in 1994. He married Frances Louise (née Phillips) Mills, daughter of Lydia Mae (née Stewart) and Solomon K. Phillips, on June 3, 1995. He had three stepsons.

Thomas died on March 3, 2009, at Chesapeake Woods Center in Cambridge. He was buried in Veterans Cemetery of the Eastern Shore in Hurlock.
