= Leon Albin =

American politician (1925–2024)

Member of the Maryland House of Delegates
- In office 1987–1994

Personal details
- Born: December 24, 1925 Baltimore, Maryland, U.S.
- Died: October 28, 2024 (aged 98)
- Party: Democratic
- Education: Baltimore City College; University of Baltimore

Leon Albin (December 24, 1925 – October 28, 2024) was an American politician. He served as a Democratic member of the Maryland House of Delegates.

== Life and career ==
Albin was born in Baltimore, Maryland, on December 24, 1925. He attended Baltimore City College and the University of Baltimore.

Albin served in the Maryland House of Delegates from 1987 to 1994.

Albin died on October 28, 2024, at the age of 98.
