= Brian Frosh =

American politician

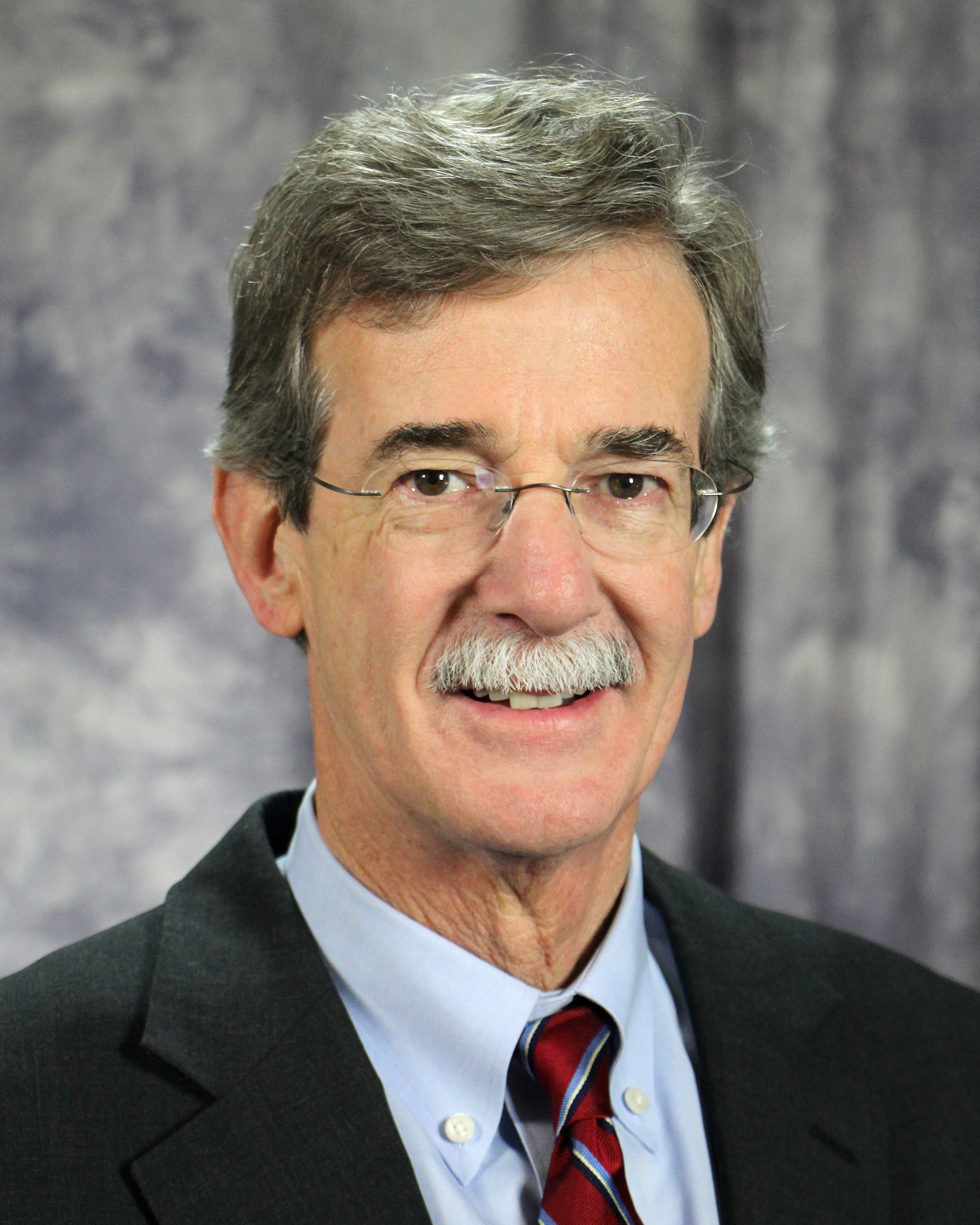
- Official portrait, 2015

46th Attorney General of Maryland
- In office January 21, 2015 – January 3, 2023
- Governor: Larry Hogan
- Preceded by: Doug Gansler
- Succeeded by: Anthony Brown

Member of the Maryland Senate from the 16th district
- In office January 11, 1995 – January 6, 2015
- Preceded by: Howard A. Denis
- Succeeded by: Susan C. Lee

Member of the Maryland House of Delegates from the 16th district
- In office 1987–1995
- Preceded by: Marilyn R. Goldwater; Connie Morella
- Succeeded by: Marilyn R. Goldwater

Personal details
- Born: October 8, 1946 (age 80) Washington, D.C., U.S.
- Party: Democratic
- Children: 2
- Education: Wesleyan University (BA); Columbia University (JD)
- Brian Frosh's voice Brian Frosh on President Donald Trump's alleged violations of the Foreign Emoluments Clause of the U.S. Constitution; Recorded January 30, 2018

Brian E. Frosh (born October 8, 1946) is an American lawyer and politician who served as the Attorney General of Maryland from 2015 to 2023. He also served five terms in the Maryland State Senate, representing Maryland's District 16 in Montgomery County. Prior to serving in the Senate, Frosh represented District 16 in the Maryland House of Delegates, serving two four-year terms.

Frosh was elected to his second term as attorney general on November 6, 2018. In his first term, Frosh joined Karl Racine, attorney general of the District of Columbia, in filing a lawsuit against Donald Trump, alleging he had violated the foreign and domestic emoluments clauses of the U.S. Constitution. On October 21, 2021, Frosh announced that he would not seek a third term in 2022.

During his tenure as attorney general, Frosh filed numerous lawsuits against the Trump administration.

== Early life and education ==
Born on October 8, 1946, Brian Frosh grew up in Montgomery County, Maryland. He earned a Bachelor of Arts degree from Wesleyan University and a Juris Doctor from Columbia Law School.

== Career ==
=== Legal career ===
Frosh joined the Maryland Bar in 1971 and the District of Columbia Bar in 1972. He was a partner at the law offices of Karp, Frosh, Lapidus, Wigodsky, & Norwood, P.A working in business litigation, commercial litigation, and real estate law.

=== Politics ===
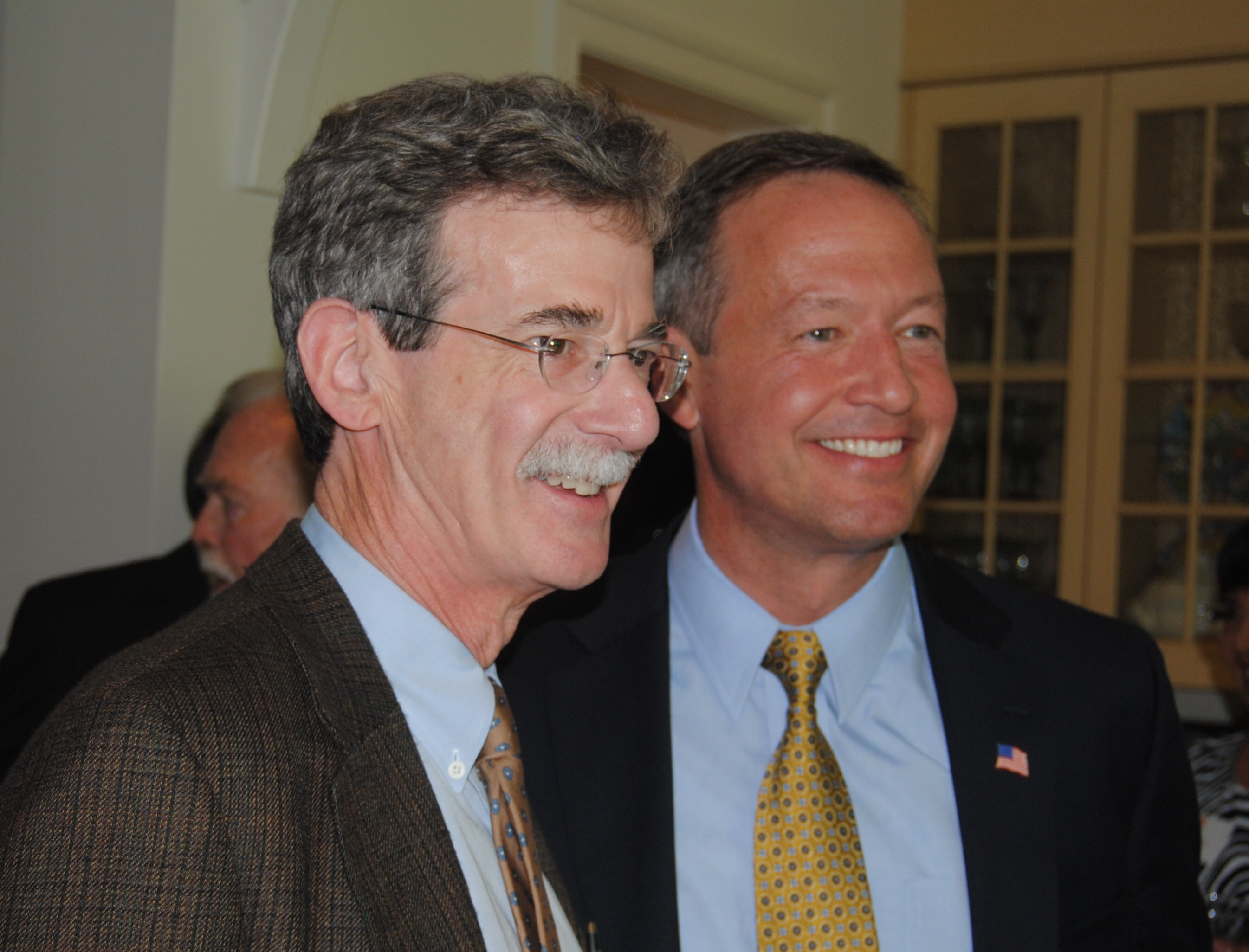
State Senator Frosh with Governor Martin O'Malley

As both a delegate and senator, Brian Frosh has represented Maryland's District 16, which includes parts of Chevy Chase, Bethesda, and Potomac. Frosh is Jewish.

Frosh represented Montgomery County in the Maryland House of Delegates from 1987 to 1995. In this role, he was a member of the Environmental Matters Committee, Tort and Insurance Reform Oversight Committee, and Joint Committee on Legislative Ethics.

Frosh brought state funding into the district to build the Capital Crescent Trail, build sound barriers, and fund programs like those at the National Center for Children and Families, the Ivymount School, Imagination Stage, Adventure Theatre and Glen Echo Park.

==== Environment ====
Frosh authored the Maryland Recycling Act, the ban on drilling for oil or gas in the Chesapeake Bay, the Maryland Brownfields Redevelopment Act, numerous energy conservation laws, Clean Cars legislation and other environmental initiatives. https://www.sierraclub.org/maryland/blog/2013/12/news-flash-sierra-club-s-maryland-chapter-endorses-brian-frosh-attorney

==== Legislative record ====
In 2009, Frosh proposed changing the laws on protective orders to better protect domestic abuse victims against gun violence, and in 2011, sought to provide temporary lodging for domestic violence victims. Frosh also sponsored legislation increasing the guidelines that courts use to set child support payments.

In 2010 Frosh supported legislation that would give the court the ability to put serious juvenile sex offenders on a registry.

==== Public education ====
As senator, Frosh worked to draft the law that provides a waiver of tuition and fees to state universities for children in foster care.

==== Energy ====
As senator, Frosh worked on a number of bills intended to promote energy efficiency, hold down energy costs and reduce the environmental impacts of energy production and use.

Frosh advocated the establishment of service standards and the imposition of penalties if electric utilities failed to provide reliable service. In 2010, Frosh called on the Public Service Commission to investigate Pepco, and in 2011 introduced legislation calling for regulations and stiff penalties. Although Frosh's original legislation passed the Senate, ultimately, the House would only enact penalties that were more lenient than Frosh's proposal.

==== Privacy and consumer law ====
As chair of the Judicial Proceedings Committee, former Senator Frosh had responsibility for legislation in the Senate dealing with privacy and consumer laws. He sponsored bills protecting the privacy of citizens' personal information in Motor Vehicle Administration files and authorizing Maryland's Attorney General to prosecute violators of Federal anti-telemarketing regulations. The Judicial Proceedings Committee approved legislation establishing a task force to recommend identity theft remedies, beefing up the original bill at former Senator Frosh's recommendation to pay specific attention to protecting social security numbers. Former Senator Frosh has also sponsored bills banning minimum price fixing and creating new tools to crack down on people who defraud the State's Medicaid program.

==== Voter registration data ====
In response to a 2017 lawsuit by Judicial Watch which sought the release of voter registration data for Montgomery County, Frosh's office filed a court document demanding that Judicial Watch "identify any Russian nationals or agents of the Russian government with whom you have communicated concerning this lawsuit."

== Attorney General ==
=== Elections ===
==== 2014 ====
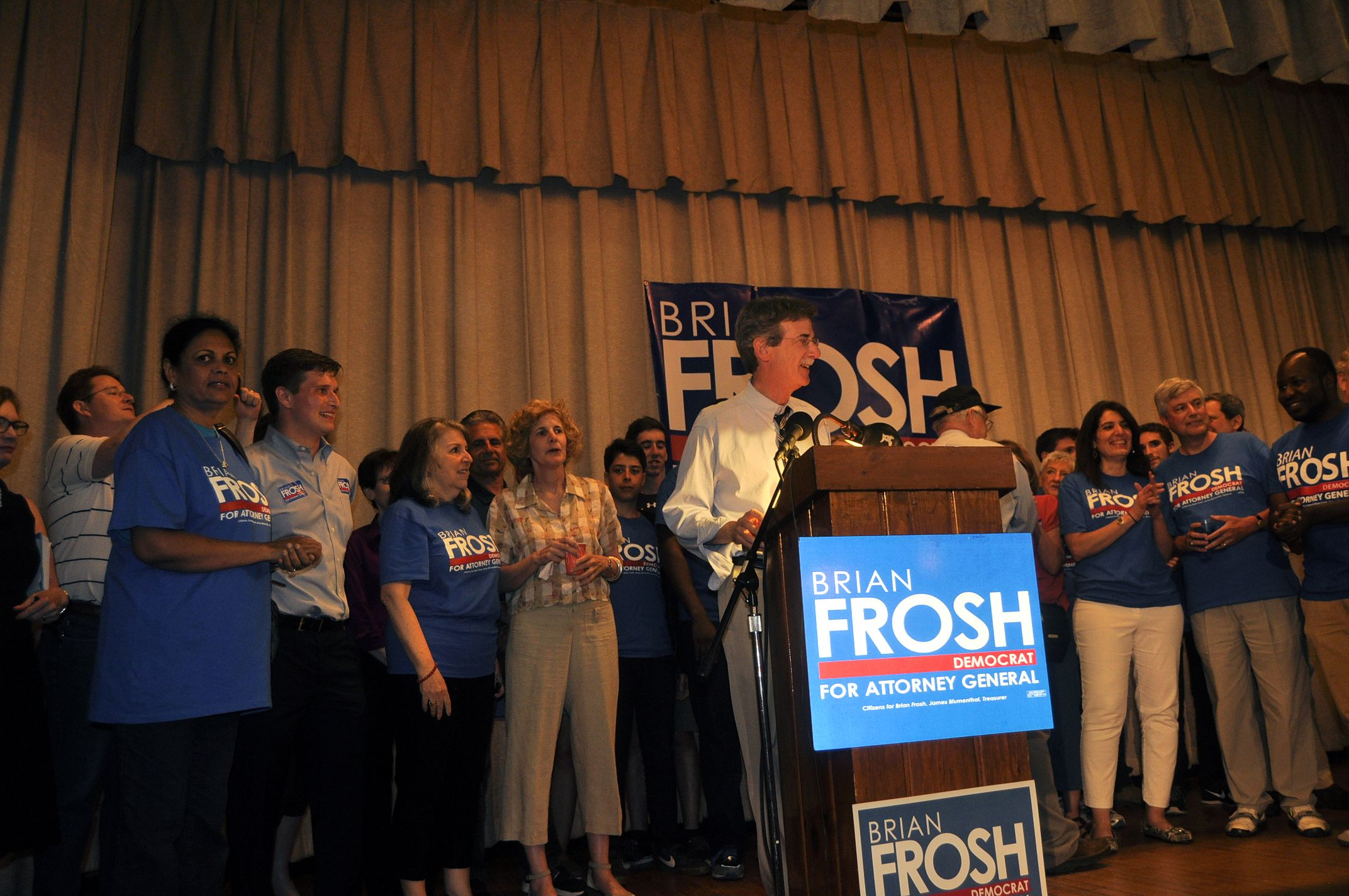
Frosh with supporters, June 2014

On October 9, 2012, Frosh announced that he had formed an exploratory committee for election to Attorney General. On July 30, 2013, he officially announced his decision to run.

Frosh, who was endorsed by Michael Bloomberg and The Washington Post, won a 3-way primary with 50% of the vote. He then won the general election, defeating Republican Jeffrey Pritzker 56% to 41%.

==== 2018 ====
On November 6, 2018, Frosh was elected for another term in office, having defeated Republican challenger Craig Wolf. Frosh campaigned on progressive policies including reduced bail for poor defendants and litigating against the Trump Administration.

Frosh and opponent Craig Wolf debated at the University of Maryland Law School after Frosh declined an invitation to a televised debate. Wolf attacked Frosh for focusing on national issues instead of Maryland crime, particularly crime in Baltimore. Frosh said he had convicted hundreds of the most dangerous people in Maryland, including drug traffickers and gang members. Wolf also took aim at Frosh's lawsuits against Trump, saying that Frosh was taking resources which should be used to promote public safety in Maryland, and instead using them to sue the Federal Government. Frosh said that he was defending affordable health care and protecting endangered species from offshore drilling.

=== Tenure ===
Frosh expanded the range of the Northeast and Mid-Atlantic Heroin Task Force.

Frosh has argued against bail that defendants can't afford, which he believes could be unconstitutional.

Frosh is leading a coalition of 12 state attorneys general opposing the federal government's plans to expand the scope of offshore drilling for oil and gas, including in waters off the coast of Maryland. Frosh joined other state attorneys general in an effort to block the Trump administration from suspending higher penalties on automobile manufacturers that fail to comply with federal fuel efficiency standards. He also is part of a multistate coalition challenging EPA's decision to roll back greenhouse gas emission standards for cars and light trucks. Frosh negotiated a $33.5 million settlement agreement with Volkswagen AG and its affiliates, Audi AG and Porsche AG. The agreement settles an enforcement action for the auto manufacturers' use of "defeat devices" in certain models of their vehicles in violation of Maryland's air quality control laws.

Frosh reached a settlement with VietNow National Headquarters, Inc., resulting in the organization's dissolution. VietNow, which also used the name VeteransNow, had been raising money using deceptive telemarketing solicitation scripts.

In August 2017, Frosh issued a cease and desist order against We Can Cer-Vive! The investigation found violations of the Maryland Solicitations Act by the organization and its owner.

=== Lawsuits against the Trump administration ===
As Maryland Attorney General, Frosh has joined lawsuits against the Trump Administration. Frosh joined a Washington State lawsuit against President Donald Trump's immigration executive order. He joined a coalition of high-tax states suing the Trump Administration over the 2017 tax reform law. He has also joined lawsuits against Trump over a citizenship question on the 2020 Census, the Emoluments Clause, greenhouse gasses, regulatory rollbacks, vehicle emissions standards, airplane noise, contraception coverage in health insurance, regulation of for-profit colleges, offshore drilling, Obamacare subsidies, what he described as Trump's "attempts to sabotage" Obamacare, air pollution, his declaration of a national emergency at the Mexican border, and pesticide labelling.

The Maryland legislature appropriated $1 million for Frosh to hire five additional attorneys to handle the anti-Trump lawsuits, but Maryland Governor Larry Hogan withheld the funds, saying that it wasn't a good use of the state's money.

=== First Amendment lawsuit ===
In January 2019, a former Maryland Delegate filed a lawsuit against Governor Hogan and Frosh relating to a violation of First Amendment rights. Specifically, through an executive order, Maryland has banned citizens who support the Boycott, Divestment and Sanctions (BDS) campaign from bidding on state contracts.

=== Adnan Syed case ===
Frosh has consistently opposed Adnan Syed's petitions in the case of the killing of Hae Min Lee, which resulted in Syed's imprisonment. In June 2016, the Baltimore City Circuit Court granted Syed's request for a new trial and vacated his conviction, ruling that Syed's attorney "rendered ineffective assistance". In May 2018, Frosh filed a petition with the Maryland Court of Appeals to deny Syed a new trial. In October 2019, Frosh authored a legal brief in opposition to Adnan Syed's petition for writ of certiorari to the United States Supreme Court. This case has been covered extensively in the podcast Undisclosed. In late 2018, according to HBO, Frosh offered Syed a plea deal for his conviction that would have required him to admit guilt and serve an additional four years in prison. Syed rejected the deal.

=== Task force, boards, and commissions ===
In 2012, Frosh was appointed by Maryland legislative leaders to chair a task force to study the impact of a Maryland Court of Appeals ruling regarding the liability of owners of pit bulls and landlords that rent to them.

== Personal life ==
He and his wife have two daughters.

== Electoral history ==
Maryland House of Delegates 16th District Democratic Primary Election, 1986
Party	Candidate	Votes	%
Democratic	Nancy Kopp (inc.)	10,150	25
Democratic	Brian Frosh	8,419	20
Democratic	Gilbert Genn	6,686	16
Democratic	Roberta Hochberg	5,931	14
Democratic	Kevin Dwyer	4,430	11
Democratic	Cathy Bernard	3,381	8
Democratic	Charles Chester	2,141	5

Maryland House of Delegates 16th District Election, 1986
Party	Candidate	Votes	%
Democratic	Nancy Kopp (inc.)	20,823	20
Democratic	Gilbert Genn	20,570	20
Democratic	Brian Frosh	20,145	20
Republican	Carol Trawick	13,730	13
Republican	William Colliton	13,727	13
Republican	John Whitney	13,476	13

Maryland House of Delegates 16th District Democratic Primary Election, 1990
Party	Candidate	Votes	%
Democratic	Nancy Kopp (inc.)	11,027	31
Democratic	Brian Frosh (inc.)	10,773	30
Democratic	Gilbert Genn (inc.)	9,926	28
Democratic	Jonathan Cohen	3,968	11

Maryland House of Delegates 16th District Election, 1990
Party	Candidate	Votes	%
Democratic	Nancy Kopp (inc.)	22,397	23
Democratic	Brian Frosh (inc.)	21,901	22
Democratic	Gilbert Genn (inc.)	21,022	21
Republican	Robert McCarthy	12,298	12
Republican	Nelson Rosenbaum	10,753	11
Republican	George Jenkins	10,602	11

Maryland State Senate 16th District Democratic Primary Election, 1994
Party	Candidate	Votes	%
Democratic	Brian Frosh	11,589	90
Democratic	John Ward	991	8
Democratic	Isaac Babazadeh	353	3

Maryland State Senate 16th District Election, 1994
Party	Candidate	Votes	%
Democratic	Brian Frosh	25,292	64
Republican	Daniel Cronin	14,377	36

Maryland State Senate 16th District Election, 1998
Party	Candidate	Votes	%
Democratic	Brian Frosh (inc.)	28,311	69
Republican	Augustus Alzona	12,564	31

Maryland State Senate 16th District Election, 2002
Party	Candidate	Votes	%
Democratic	Brian Frosh (inc.)	32,478	72.06
Republican	Tom Devor	12,563	27.87
Write-ins	Write-ins	30	0.07

Maryland State Senate 16th District Election, 2006
Party	Candidate	Votes	%
Democratic	Brian Frosh (inc.)	35,290	75.7
Republican	Robert Dyer, Jr.	11,317	24.3
Write-ins	Write-ins	28	0.1

Maryland State Senate 16th District Election, 2010
Party	Candidate	Votes	%
Democratic	Brian Frosh (inc.)	30,762	70.5
Republican	Jerry Cave	12,815	29.4
Write-ins	Write-ins	39	0.1

Maryland Attorney General Democratic Primary Election, 2014
Party	Candidate	Votes	%
Democratic	Brian Frosh	228,360	49.6
Democratic	Jon Cardin	139,582	30.3
Democratic	Aisha Braveboy	92,664	20.1

Maryland Attorney General Election, 2014
Party	Candidate	Votes	%
Democratic	Brian Frosh	935,846	55.8
Republican	Jeffrey Pritzker	682,265	40.7
Libertarian	Leo Wayne Dymowski	57,069	3.4
Write-ins	Write-ins	2,089	0.01

Maryland Attorney General Election, 2018
Party	Candidate	Votes	%
Democratic	Brian Frosh	1,474,833	64.81
Republican	Craig Wolf	799,035	35.11
Write-ins	Write-ins	1,920	0.8

== See also ==
- List of Jewish American jurists

Legal offices
Preceded by Doug Gansler	Attorney General of Maryland; 2015–2023	Succeeded by Anthony Brown
