= Maryland Board of Public Works =

Government body

The Board of Public Works is a three-member body consisting of the Governor, Comptroller, and Treasurer of the state of Maryland in the United States. It oversees many aspects of the state's finances.

== History and purpose ==
The board was established by the Maryland Constitution of 1864, replacing the Commissioners of Public Works and various other boards. The board acts as a check on the power of the General Assembly and also guarantees "that significant State expenditures are necessary and appropriate, fiscally responsible, fair, and lawful" and that "executive decisions are made responsibly and responsively".

== Duties ==
A unique institution amongst both the federal and U.S. state governments, the board is also quite powerful, possessing the final say in spending through loans approved by the Maryland General Assembly and in capital improvements (except roads and bridges). In addition, the board has the authority to borrow money and provide supplemental funding for state agencies. All state land purchases are carried out by the board and all contracts for office space and leases are approved by the board. While the state legislature is not in session, the board takes up many of its fiscal responsibilities in ensuring the operation of the state government.

== Current members ==
Office	Incumbent	Image	in Office since	Political party
Governor of Maryland	Wes Moore		January 18, 2023	Democratic
Comptroller of Maryland	Brooke Lierman		January 16, 2023	Democratic
Treasurer of Maryland	Dereck E. Davis		December 17, 2021	Democratic
