= Frank Boston =

American politician

Frank D. Boston, Jr.

Member of the Maryland House of Delegates from the 41st district
- In office 1987 – January 13, 1999
- Preceded by: Wendell H. Phillips
- Succeeded by: Wendell F. Phillips

Personal details
- Born: December 5, 1938 Baltimore, Maryland, U.S.
- Died: May 10, 2011 (aged 72) Baltimore, Maryland, U.S.
- Party: Democratic
- Children: Carmen and Frank Boston, III

Frank D. Boston, Jr. (December 5, 1938 – May 10, 2011) was an American politician who served in the Maryland House of Delegates and a chairman of the powerful Baltimore City Delegation. Boston was one of three delegates serving the 41st legislative district, which lies in the central, northwest section of Baltimore City.

== Background ==
Frank Boston was born in Baltimore, Maryland, December 5, 1938. He attended Frederick Douglass Senior High School (Baltimore, Maryland) and later received a bachelor's degree from the University of Maryland in 1973. Boston also received a master's degree in education from the Johns Hopkins University in 1979. Boston was a vocational evaluator and teacher with the Baltimore City Public School System.

== In the Legislature ==
Boston was appointed to the House of Delegates after He represented District 41 (D) in Baltimore City from 1987 to 1999. Boston's first committee assigned was the House Constitutional and Administrative Law Committee in 1987. In 1991 he joined the House Judiciary Committee and served there for two years. He then served for one year on the Commerce and Government Matters Committee (1994), and finished his career on the Economic Matters Committee (1995–1999). Boston was a leader on the House floor as well, serving as Deputy Majority Whip from 1992 to 1994. He was Chairman of the Baltimore City Delegation and a member of the Legislative Black Caucus of Maryland.
