= Pauline Menes =

American politician

Member of the Maryland House of Delegates from the 21st district
- In office 1967–2007
- Succeeded by: Joseline Peña-Melnyk

Personal details
- Born: Pauline Herskowitz; July 16, 1924 New York City, New York, U.S.
- Died: May 16, 2009 (aged 84) Silver Spring, Maryland, U.S.
- Resting place: King David Memorial Gardens, Falls Church, Virginia
- Party: Democratic
- Spouse: Melvin Menes
- Children: 3
- Education: Hunter College

Pauline Menes (1924–2009) served in the Maryland House of Delegates for 40 years. In the 1970s she co-founded the Maryland Women's Legislative Caucus, the first caucus of its kind in the United States; founded the Women's Network of the National Conference of State Legislatures; and was the first woman to serve on the state Judiciary Committee. Over the years she helped pass more than 2,000 bills and policy changes. She was inducted into the Maryland Women's Hall of Fame in 2008.

== Early life and education ==
She was born in New York City in 1904 and attended New York public schools. She studied business economics and geography at Hunter College, graduating with a B. A. degree in 1945.

After college she moved to Washington, D.C., to take a wartime job as an economist for the Office of the Quartermaster General of the United States Army. From 1949 to 1950, she worked as a geographer for the Army Map Service.

== Political career ==
=== Prince George's county ===
Menes first became involved in politics in 1953, when she helped organize a voter registration drive in the University Hills area of Prince George's County. She remained active in county politics, and in 1962 ran for county Register of Wills, losing the election by a hundred votes. She served as County Board of Elections Chief Clerk in 1963 and Secretary for the Democratic Steering Committee in 1966. In the mid-1960s she also worked as a substitute teacher in county public high schools.

=== House of Delegates ===
She first won a seat in the Maryland House of Delegates in 1966, and was continually reelected until she retired in 2007. She represented the 21st District, a section of northern Prince George's County which included College Park, Beltsville, and Laurel. During her tenure she focused on education, healthcare, criminal justice, aging, the arts, and women's issues, helping to pass over 2,000 bills and policy changes.

During her first term she was appointed to her first leadership position by Governor Spiro Agnew. As chair of the Commission on the Public Library Laws, she organized legislation to improve the state's library system.

In 1971, Menes was the subject of a notorious joke by Thomas Hunter Lowe, then the Speaker of the Maryland House of Delegates. At the time, she was one of only eleven female lawmakers in Maryland. The House building in Annapolis, Maryland, did not have a women's restroom; the women had to walk across a crowded concourse to use a public restroom. The delay was serious enough to cause women lawmakers to miss an occasional vote. After Menes complained, Lowe appointed her "chairman" of the women's restroom committee and, in front of all the delegates, presented her with a fur-covered toilet seat. Menes later claimed the incident as a victory of sorts, noting that it was the first time a woman had appeared on the rostrum. The following year she co-founded the Maryland women's legislative caucus, notably the first of its kind in the United States, and served as its president until 1979. The women got their own restroom in 1973.

In the mid-1970s, she worked to change a state law that prohibited a woman from filing a civil lawsuit against her husband. She said at the time that the changes would "go a long way to helping Maryland women protect themselves...Just the threat of financial responsibility will stay many a husband's hand." She successfully sponsored bills to require AIDS testing of prisoners, create needle-exchange programs, and require medical personnel, teachers, and social workers to report suspected child abuse.

Menes was active in many committees and advisory boards. She founded the Women's Network of the National Conference of State Legislatures (NCSL) in 1977 and served as its president until 1979. She led the Maryland delegation to the National Women's Conference in 1977 and served as president of the National Order of Women Legislators from 1979 to 1980. In 1979 she became the first female member of the state Judiciary Committee, on which she served until the end of her career. She chaired the Special Committee on Drug and Alcohol Abuse from 1987 to 2006. At various times she was a member of the Rules and Executive Nominations Committee, the Legislative Policy Committee, the Joint Committee on Legislative Ethics, the Joint Oversight Committee on Corrections, the Maryland State Arts Council, the Maryland Commission on Aging, and the Prince George's County Domestic Violence Task Force, among others. During her last few years in office she served as Maryland's House parliamentarian.

== Awards ==
- Ann London Scott Award for Legislative Excellence, Maryland National Organization for Women, 1976
- International Women's Year Award, Prince George's County International Women's Year Commission, 1977
- Woman of the Year award, College Park Business and Professional Women's Association, 1978
- Hunter College Hall of Fame, 1986
- Prince George's County's Women's Hall of Fame, 1989
- Annual MNADV Award, Maryland Network Against Domestic Violence, 1995
- Dewitt Award, Maryland Correctional Administrators Association, 2001
- Maryland Women's Hall of Fame, 2008

== Personal life ==
She married Melvin Menes on September 1, 1946. The couple met at the Office of the Quartermaster General, where she trained him as her replacement. They had three daughters. She was Jewish.

She died of pneumonia at Holy Cross Hospital in Silver Spring, Maryland, on May 16, 2009. She was buried at the King David Memorial Gardens in Falls Church, Virginia.
