= Paul D. Muldowney =

American politician (born 1932)

Member of the Maryland House of Delegates from the 3A district
- In office 1979–1986
- Preceded by: Charles F. Wagaman Jr.
- Succeeded by: Bruce Poole

Personal details
- Born: June 28, 1935 (age 91) Richmond, Virginia, U.S.
- Party: Democratic
- Children: 7
- Education: Virginia Military Institute (B.S.E.E.)

Military service
- Allegiance: United States
- Branch/service: United States Army

Paul D. Muldowney (born June 28, 1935) is an American politician. He was a member of the Maryland House of Delegates, representing District 3A from 1979 to 1986.

== Early life ==
Paul D. Muldowney was born on June 28, 1935, in Richmond, Virginia. He attended Benedictine College Preparatory. He graduated from Virginia Military Institute with a Bachelor of Science in Electrical Engineering in 1957.

== Career ==
Muldowney worked as a business executive and served in the U.S. Army. Muldowney served as a member of the Maryland House of Delegates, representing District 3A from 1979 to 1986. He was elected as a Democrat. In 1994, Muldowney ran for Maryland's 6th congressional district seat in the U.S. Congress.

== Personal life ==
Muldowney is married with seven children.
