= Gerald Curran =

American politician (1939–2013)

- Born: March 20, 1939; Baltimore, Maryland, U.S.
- Died: March 27, 2013 (aged 74); Baltimore, Maryland, U.S.
- Education: University of Baltimore
- Occupations: politician, lawyer
- Political party: Democratic
- Spouse: Anna Jeannette Curran
- Children: 5
- Relatives: J. Joseph Curran Jr. (cousin)

Gerald Curran (March 20, 1939 – March 27, 2013) was an American politician and lawyer.

Born in Baltimore, Maryland, Curran received his bachelor's and law degrees from the University of Baltimore. He practiced law and was in the insurance business. He served in the Maryland House of Delegates as a Democrat from 1967 to 1998. He was married to Anna Jeannette Curran and has five children. His first cousin was J. Joseph Curran Jr. He died in Baltimore, Maryland.
