= Larry Young (politician) =

American politician

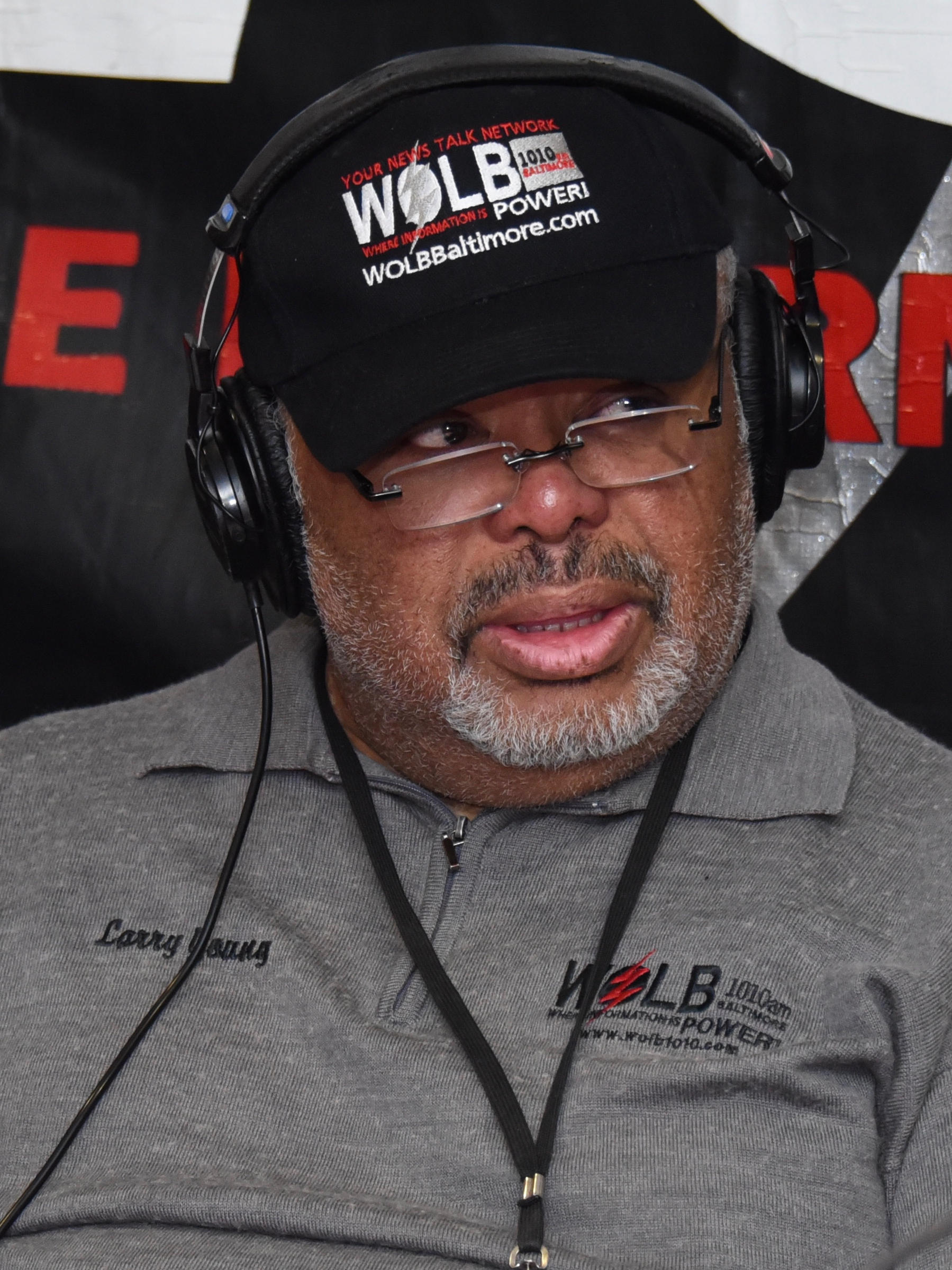
- Young in 2017

Member of the Maryland Senate from the 44th district
- In office 1988–1998

Member of the Maryland House of Delegates from the 38th district
- In office 1975–1988

Personal details
- Born: November 25, 1949 (age 76) Baltimore, Maryland, U.S.
- Party: Democratic

Larry Young (born November 25, 1949) is a former member of the Maryland Senate from 1988 to 1998, representing Baltimore's 44th district. He was expelled from the Senate in 1998 over ethics charges, but later acquitted at his own trial.

== Background ==
Born in Baltimore, Maryland, on November 25, 1949, Young attended Baltimore City public schools.

== Career ==
=== Legislature ===
Young was a member of the Maryland House of Delegates from 1975 to 1988, representing District 38 (Baltimore City). He was Chair of the Environmental Matters Committee, 1983–87 (member, 1975–83) and Chair of the Baltimore City Delegation, 1987–88.

In June 1988 Young sought to become chairman of The Legislative Black Caucus of Maryland, a position that is determined by a vote of African-Americans serving in the Maryland General Assembly. The caucus elected Curt Anderson over Young when Young was under investigation by a Baltimore grand jury for assault and filing a false kidnapping report.

Young was a member of the Maryland Senate from 1988 to 1998, representing Baltimore City District 44 (1992–98) and Baltimore City District 39 (1988–92). He served on the Senate Judicial Proceedings Committee from 1988 to 1990. From 1990 to 1998 he served on the Senate Finance Committee.

==== Expulsion ====
The Maryland Senate expelled Young on January 16, 1998, for using his position to profit his private business. Young, who sat as chairman of the Health subcommittee of the Senate Finance Committee, was also president of a private, for-profit health consulting firm called the LY Group. The ethics committee found that Young used his position and influence to leverage $10,000–99,000 into the LY Group. In addition, the committee found that Young solicited and accepted a number of gifts in violation of the ethics law, including a $24,800 1995 blue Lincoln Town Car. He was later acquitted of criminal bribery charges.

== In popular culture ==
Young has since presented a talk radio show, and played a talk radio show host in the HBO drama The Wire. In an essay in the official series guide, The Wire: Truth Be Told, William Zorzi implies that the character of the corrupt and venal Maryland State Senator Clay Davis is patterned on Young.

The details of Larry Young's false abduction report and the resulting political aftermath is described in David Simon's Homicide: A Year on the Killing Streets. In the book, it is implied that Young's false report was an attempted cover up for his own assault against a political aide, in an argument over Young's sexual advances against the aide's fiancé.
