= Ralph M. Hughes =

American politician (born 1948)

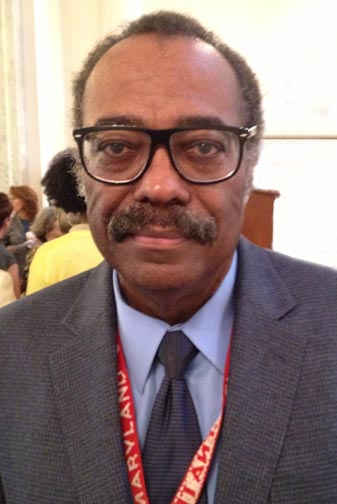

Member of the Maryland Senate from the 40th district
- In office 1991–2007
- Preceded by: Troy Brailey
- Succeeded by: Catherine Pugh
- Constituency: Baltimore City

Maryland House of Delegates
- In office 1983–1991

Personal details
- Born: May 17, 1948 (age 78) Baltimore, Maryland
- Party: Democratic

Ralph M. Hughes (born April 17, 1948) is an American politician who represented district 40 in the Maryland State Senate from 1991 to 2007 and a member of the Maryland House of Delegates from the same district from 1983 to 1991.

== Background ==
Hughes was born in Baltimore, Maryland, April 17, 1948. He attended Baltimore City Public Schools and graduated from Baltimore City College in 1966. Hughes went on to Morgan State College earning a B.A. degree in 1970. Three years later he completed the Howard University School of Law earning a J.D. The Johns Hopkins University, M.A.S., 1985. Professor (criminal justice), Coppin State University, from 2007. Member, Monumental City Bar Association. He is a member of the Mount Hope Baptist Church in Baltimore and is married.

== In the legislature ==
Hughes won his first election in 1982, running for one of three seats in Baltimore's 40th legislative district to the Maryland House of Delegates. There he served on the Judiciary Committee, 1983-90. In 1990 he won a seat in the Maryland Senate and served on its Judicial Proceedings Committee from 1991 to 2007. He was chair, Special Committee on Substance Abuse, 2001–2007, member, Joint Committee on Legislative Ethics, 1995, Senate Chair, Joint Committee on Investigation, 1995, member, Joint Committee on Federal Relations, 1995–1999; Article 27 (crimes & punishments) Revision Committee, 1999–2003, Senate Special Commission on Medical Malpractice Liability Insurance, 2004, Abatement of Drug-Related Nuisances Work Group, 2004. Hughes served as Vice-Chair, Baltimore City Delegation, a member, Legislative Black Caucus of Maryland, 1991-2007 (chair, crime & safety committee, 2000; member, law & justice committee, 2000–2007, redistricting committee, 2000–2007; drug treatment committee, 2001–2007).

=== Legislative notes ===
- 2006 Hughes sponsored Senate Bill 592 which would have repealed Maryland's mandatory minimum sentences for repeat felony drug offenders
- 2003 Hughes introduced a bill that would have imposed a moratorium on Maryland's death penalty. The bill, however, died on the Senate floor with 23 senators voting for it and 24 against.
