= Wendell H. Phillips =

American politician

Wendell Harrison Phillips

Member of the Maryland House of Delegates from the 41st district
- In office January 10, 1979 – January 10, 1987
- Preceded by: Pinkney A. Howell
- Succeeded by: Frank Boston

Personal details
- Born: November 19, 1934 Brooklyn, New York
- Died: January 29, 1993 (aged 58) Baltimore, Maryland
- Party: Democratic
- Spouse: Dorothy Allen Phillips
- Children: Wendell Fitzgerald Phillips
- Occupation: Pastor

Wendell Harrison Phillips (November 19, 1934 – January 29, 1993) was an American politician who served in the Maryland House of Delegates and was the first African American chairman of the Baltimore City Delegation. Phillips was one of three delegates serving the 41st legislative district, which lies in the central, northwest section of Baltimore City.

== Background ==
Delegate Phillips was born in Brooklyn, New York. His family moved to Pittsburgh, Pennsylvania at an early age. He was baptized at the Carrone Baptist church and attended Westinghouse High School, both in Pittsburgh. He earned a B.S. from Virginia Union University, attended Penn State University and received his M.Div. from Colgate Rochester Crozer Divinity School. He was an ordained clergyman and founding pastor of the Heritage United Church of Christ in Baltimore, Maryland from 1964 to 1993. Phillips served on the U.S. Civil Rights Commission Advisory Board from 1968 to 1970. He was the President, Interdenominational Ministerial Alliance in Baltimore and a delegate to the First Conference of Christians, Israelis, and Palestinians in 1976. Phillips is a past president of the NAACP of Rochester, New York and active in the civil rights movement.

== Family ==
Phillips married the former Dorothy Allen of Rochester, New York on June 11, 1960, the couple had one son, Wendell Fitzgerald Phillips who also served in the Maryland General Assembly.

== In the Legislature ==
Phillips was a member of the House of Delegates from 1979 to 1987 and a member of its Constitutional and Administrative Law Committee. He was also a member of the Joint Committee On Legislative Ethics. Although he was the chairman of the Baltimore City Delegation, the motorcycle-riding Phillips initially had a stormy relationship with then Baltimore mayor William Donald Schaefer. As delegation chairman, Phillips was responsible for "pushing" the legislation in Annapolis that Schaefer thought was important for Baltimore. Phillips, the consummate bridge builder, knew that for Baltimore City to truly benefit from effective leadership, he and Schaefer had to find a way to work together for the betterment of Baltimore's entire citizenry.
