= Frank Pesci =

American politician

Frank Bernard Pesci Sr. (January 6, 1929 – January 17, 2015) was a Maryland teacher, politician and lobbyist who represented Prince George's County as a Democratic member of the Maryland House of Delegates from 1971-86.
