= William S. Horne =

American politician (1936–2022)

William Scott Horne

Circuit Administrative Judge of the 2nd Judicial Court
- In office 1999 – November 6, 2005

County Administrative Judge for the Talbot County Circuit Court
- In office June 2, 1989 – January 27, 2006
- Succeeded by: Sidney S. Campen, Jr.

Member of the Maryland House of Delegates from the 37th district
- In office 1983–1989 Serving with Richard F. Colburn (R) and Samuel Q. Johnson III (D)
- Preceded by: (Redistricting)
- Succeeded by: Philip C. Foster
- Constituency: Caroline, Dorchester, Talbot, and Wicomico counties

Member of the Maryland House of Delegates from the 35th district
- In office 1973–1983 Serving with John R. Hargreaves (D) and William Henry Thomas (D)
- Preceded by: Thomas Hunter Lowe
- Succeeded by: (Redistricting)
- Constituency: Caroline, Dorchester, Talbot, and Wicomico counties

Talbot County State's Attorney
- In office 1971–1973
- Preceded by: John C. North II
- Succeeded by: Sidney S. Campen Jr.

Personal details
- Born: June 23, 1936 Easton, Maryland, U.S.
- Died: April 3, 2022 (aged 85) Easton, Maryland
- Party: Democratic
- Education: Virginia Tech (BS); Tulane University Law School (LLB)

William Scott Horne (July 23, 1936 – April 3, 2022) was an American politician and judge. He was a former Democratic member of the Maryland House of Delegates.

== Early life and career ==
Horne was born in Easton, Maryland, and attended public schools in the area. Before college, he attended The Bolles School in Jacksonville, Florida and the University of Maryland. He served in the United States Army from 1956 to 1958. He graduated from Virginia Tech with a B.S. degree in 1964 and from Tulane University Law School with a LL.B degree in 1965. Horne was admitted to the Maryland Bar in 1966.

Horne first entered into politics in 1968 after being elected Assistant State's Attorney for Talbot County, Maryland, which he served from 1968 to 1971, and as the county's State's Attorney until 1973. Afterwards, he was elected to the Maryland House of Delegates, representing District 35 from 1973 to 1982 and District 37 until 1989. He then served as judge of the Talbot County Circuit Court from 1989 until his retirement in 2005. He died at his home in Easton, Maryland.

== In the legislature ==
Horne was sworn into the Maryland House of Delegates in 1973.

=== Committee assignments ===
- Chair, Judiciary Committee, 1987–1989 (member, 1973–1989)
- Member, Legislative Policy Committee, 1987–1989
- Rules and Executive Nominations Committee, 1987–1989.
- Chair, Joint Oversight Committee on Juvenile Services Initiatives
- Co-chair, Task Force on Drunk & Drugged Driving
- Member, Task Force on Crime, 1976–1980
- Juvenile Justice Advisory Committee, 1980–1982
- Advisory Board on Liability, 1980–1982
- Task Force to Study the Maryland Tax Court, 1984–1985
- Member, Atlantic States Marine Fisheries Commission, 1987–1989
- Member, Court of Appeals Standing Committee on Rules of Practice and Procedure, 1987–1989

=== Other memberships ===
- Chair, Eastern Shore Delegation, 1983-1987
