= Charles J. Ryan Jr. =

American politician

Charles J. Ryan Jr. (15 September 1936 – 22 January 1994) was an American politician. He was a member of the Maryland General Assembly and served as chairman of the House Appropriations Committee.

== Biography ==
Born in Southbridge, Massachusetts, he completed his education at the Walsh School of Foreign Service at Georgetown University, the University of Maryland (Master of Arts), and the John F. Kennedy School of Government at Harvard University.

Ryan was elected in 1978 to represent Bowie in the Maryland House of Delegates. During his tenure, he was involved in significant budget and tax debates. His political career in the legislature concluded in 1992 following a disagreement with then-House Speaker R. Clayton Mitchell Jr., leading to his subsequent appointment as a legislative lobbyist for the University of Maryland Medical Center.

Ryan, a Democrat, advocated for government programs supporting disadvantaged populations, a stance that occasionally put him at odds with Republicans and some members of his own party. His viewpoints on tax increases and government spending were particularly contentious.
