= Joan Breslin Pitkin =

American politician

Joan Breslin Pitkin was a delegate to the Maryland General Assembly for 24 years. Pitkin was born in New York City in 1932. Pitkin received her college education at the University of Vermont.

== Career ==
Joan Pitkin served as an elected Delegate to the Maryland state legislature, Maryland General Assembly, in Annapolis, Maryland, from 1979 to 2003. She represented the 23rd district in Prince George's County, and was a member of the Democratic Party.

=== Significant accomplishments ===
During her twenty four years in office, Delegate Pitkin made cancer prevention measures a prime concern and became a nationally recognized health care advocate for introducing landmark health care proposals which have become models for and set standards for the country. Her bills were often passed without the backing of leadership or powerful lobbyists. For example; her work resulted in Maryland being one of two states in the nation to require full disclosure in breast cancer treatment alternatives and in legally instituting the two-step mastectomy choice.

=== Mentoring ===
Delegate Pitkin often worked with the Maryland Commission for Women and groups such as The Maryland Women's Health Coalition to help them develop their annual legislative agendas. Through membership on the Maryland Women's Health Promotion Council, the state Cancer Council and as a member of the Women's Caucus, Legislative Committee, Pitkin assisted both professional and citizen groups in the development of their legislative programs and priorities. In the 2000 session, as vice chairman of the House Appropriations Subcommittee on Health and Human Resources, Pitkin, along with several other members, negotiated with state and county health departments; hospital representatives; community health centers and provider groups; scientists; researchers and other academics; constituent members of the Cancer, Heart and Lung associations; and many others in a collaborative effort to determine how the Cigarette Restitution Fund from the Global Tobacco Settlement would be distributed, now and in the future.

== Awards and honors ==
Joan Breslin Pitkin won Maryland's Top 100 Women award in 2001, 2003 and 2005, the maximum number of times the award can be given to one person, which elevates her into the organization's Circle of Excellence. The Circle of Excellence is awarded for a recipient's sustained achievement in their field.

1983-2002: 100% Voting Record Award for Legislative Leadership, The League of Conservation Voters; 1996: Community Service Award, Washington Psychiatric Society; 1991: Legislative Honor Roll, Mental Health Association; 1992: Outstanding Leadership in Cancer Control and Prevention, Maryland Chapter of the American Cancer Society; 1991: Legislative Leadership Award, American Lung Association; 1998: Woman of the Year, Maryland Business and Professional Women's Clubs; 1998: Good Guy Award, Maryland Group Against Smokers' Pollution; 1999: Children's Champion Award, Maryland Foster Care Review Boards

== Sources ==
- Article title
- Article title
