= Marilyn R. Goldwater =

American politician

Marilyn Goldwater

Member of the Maryland House of Delegates from the 16th district
- In office January 11, 1995 – August 7, 2007
- Preceded by: Brian Frosh
- Succeeded by: William Frick
- In office 1975–1986
- Succeeded by: Brian Frosh

Personal details
- Born: January 29, 1927 Boston, Massachusetts, U.S.
- Died: January 7, 2023 (aged 95) Manhattan Beach, California, U.S.
- Party: Democratic
- Spouse: William H. Goldwater
- Occupation: Nurse

Marilyn Rubin Goldwater (January 29, 1927 – January 7, 2023) was an American politician from Bethesda, Maryland and a member of the Democratic Party. She was a Member of the Maryland House of Delegates, 1975–86, and 1995–2007, representing Maryland's Legislative District 16 in Montgomery County.

Goldwater was born in Boston, Massachusetts. She graduated from the Mount Sinai Hospital School of Nursing in New York City in 1948 as a registered nurse (RN) before working as an emergency department nurse and hospital administrator.

After moving to Maryland in 1960, Goldwater became active in local politics, initially through her children's PTA and later being elected president of the Women's Suburban Democratic Club. She was first elected to the Maryland legislature in 1974, and as a freshman delegate, she was one of the first two women to be appointed to the Appropriations Committee. She later ran unsuccessfully for Maryland Senate and served in the administration of Governor William Donald Schaefer as a health policy adviser. In that position, she helped to start the Governor's Wellmobile Program, operated by the Maryland School of Nursing. At the conclusion of Gov. Schaefer's second term, Goldwater ran again for the District 16 Delegate seat, returning to the House of Delegates in 1995. As a legislator, Goldwater was known for her healthcare advocacy; she also supported the Intercounty Connector and opposed slot machines.

Goldwater retired from the House of Delegates on August 27, 2007. She died from Parkinson's disease on January 7, 2023, at her daughter's home in Manhattan Beach, California.
