= Helen L. Koss =

Maryland politician (1922–2008)

Member of the Maryland House of Delegates from the 18th District
- In office 1983–1987
- Preceded by: Mary H. Boergers
- Succeeded by: C. Lawrence Wiser
- Constituency: Silver Spring, Maryland

Member of the Maryland House of Delegates from the 19th District
- In office 1971–1983
- Succeeded by: Joseph E. Owens
- Constituency: Silver Spring, Maryland

Personal details
- Born: June 3, 1922 New York City, New York, U.S.
- Died: September 28, 2008 (aged 86) Silver Spring, Maryland, U.S.
- Party: Democratic
- Spouse: Howard Koss
- Children: 2
- Education: Bennington College

Helen L. Koss (June 3, 1922 – September 28, 2008) was a member of the Maryland House of Delegates for District 18 and 19, representing Silver Spring, Maryland for sixteen years.

== Early life and education ==
Koss was born Helen Levine in New York City on June 3, 1922. She grew up in Ellenville, New York, graduating from Bennington College in 1942 and moving to Washington, D.C., to work in the school lunch program at the United States Department of Agriculture.

== Political career ==
Koss served as the president of the Maryland League of Women Voters from 1963 to 1967, and she was a delegate to the Maryland Constitutional Convention in 1967 and 1978. She was elected to the Maryland House of Delegates in 1970, serving four terms from 1971 to 1987. From 1971 to 1983, she represented the 19th district and from 1983 to 1987, she represented the 18th district. During her tenure, she worked to pass the Maryland Equal Rights Amendment and legislation to aid displaced homemakers. She proposed the Displaced Homemakers Bill which aimed to train women in skills relevant to work outside the home; the bill was passed and a center was created for women to learn and practice these skills. Koss worked to reform and eliminate gender discrimination in the credit, housing, and insurance sectors. She was a leader on state ethics and served as the chairwoman of the House Constitutional and Administrative Law committee from 1979 until her retirement in 1987. She was the first woman appointed to chair a standing committee in the Maryland House of Delegates. In 1993, Governor Parris Glendening appointed Koss to the state election board, where she served until 2003.

Koss was inducted into the Maryland Women's Hall of Fame in 1997. She was recognized by the League of Women Voters of Montgomery County with one of its Lavinia Awards in 1999.

== Personal life ==
She and her husband, Howard, moved to Montgomery County, Maryland in 1951, where they raised two daughters.

== Death ==
Koss died of lung cancer on September 28, 2008, at Holy Cross Hospital.
