= Richard N. Dixon =

American politician

22nd Treasurer of Maryland
- In office 1996–2002
- Governor: Parris Glendening
- Preceded by: Lucille Mauer
- Succeeded by: Nancy K. Kopp

Member of the Maryland House of Delegates
- In office 1983-1996

Personal details
- Born: April 17, 1938 Westminster, Maryland, U.S.
- Died: June 7, 2012 (aged 74) Baltimore, Maryland
- Party: Democratic
- Education: Morgan State University, 1960;
- Profession: stock broker, Politician

Richard N. Dixon (April 17, 1938 – June 7, 2012) was the first African American Treasurer of Maryland. Previously, he was a member of the Maryland House of Delegates, representing Carroll County, Maryland, from 1983 to 1996.

== Background ==
Richard Dixon was one of six children of Thomas and Mamie Dixon. His father earned a living as a custodian but insisted that his children go to college.

=== Education ===
Dixon attended the Robert Moton School, in Westminster, Maryland, the only school in the county which black children could attend. He then attended college at Morgan State College in Baltimore, Maryland, earning a Bachelor of Science degree. After Morgan, he enlisted in the U.S. Army, entering as a private and leaving with the rank of captain. Dixon then returned to Morgan and earned his M.B.A.

Political offices
Preceded by Lucille Maurer	Treasurer of Maryland; 1996–2002	Succeeded by Nancy K. Kopp
