= Clarence "Tiger" Davis =

American politician

Member of the Maryland House of Delegates from the 45th district
- In office January 12, 1983 – January 7, 2007
- Preceded by: Joseph A. Chester, Sr.
- Succeeded by: Cheryl Glenn

Personal details
- Born: September 25, 1942 (age 83) Wilkes County, Georgia, U.S.
- Party: Democratic
- Spouse: Married
- Children: Four children
- Education: Paul Laurence Dunbar School, Baltimore
- Alma mater: Morgan State College, B.A., 1968; Morgan State University, M.A., 1978

Military service
- Branch/service: U.S. Air Force
- Years of service: 1960-1964

Clarence "Tiger" Davis (born September 25, 1942) is an American politician who represented Maryland's 45th legislative district located in northeast Baltimore City in the Maryland House of Delegates.

== Background ==
Davis was born in Georgia, USA, and graduated from the Paul Laurence Dunbar School in Baltimore, Maryland. He then enlisted in U.S. Air Force and served from 1960 to 1964, after which he was accepted at Morgan State College, where he earned a B.A. degree 4 years later. In 1978, he earned a master's degree, also from Morgan. Although he never tried out for any athletic teams while he was at Morgan, members of the Morgan State Bears lacrosse team considered him an honorary member because of his tremendous support for them.

Davis is a member of the Veterans of Foreign Wars, Vietnam Veterans of America, and is a regional co-ordinator for the National Association for Black Veterans. He is a mason and attends the St. Paul's Baptist Church in Baltimore. Davis is married with four children and several grandchildren.

== In the legislature ==
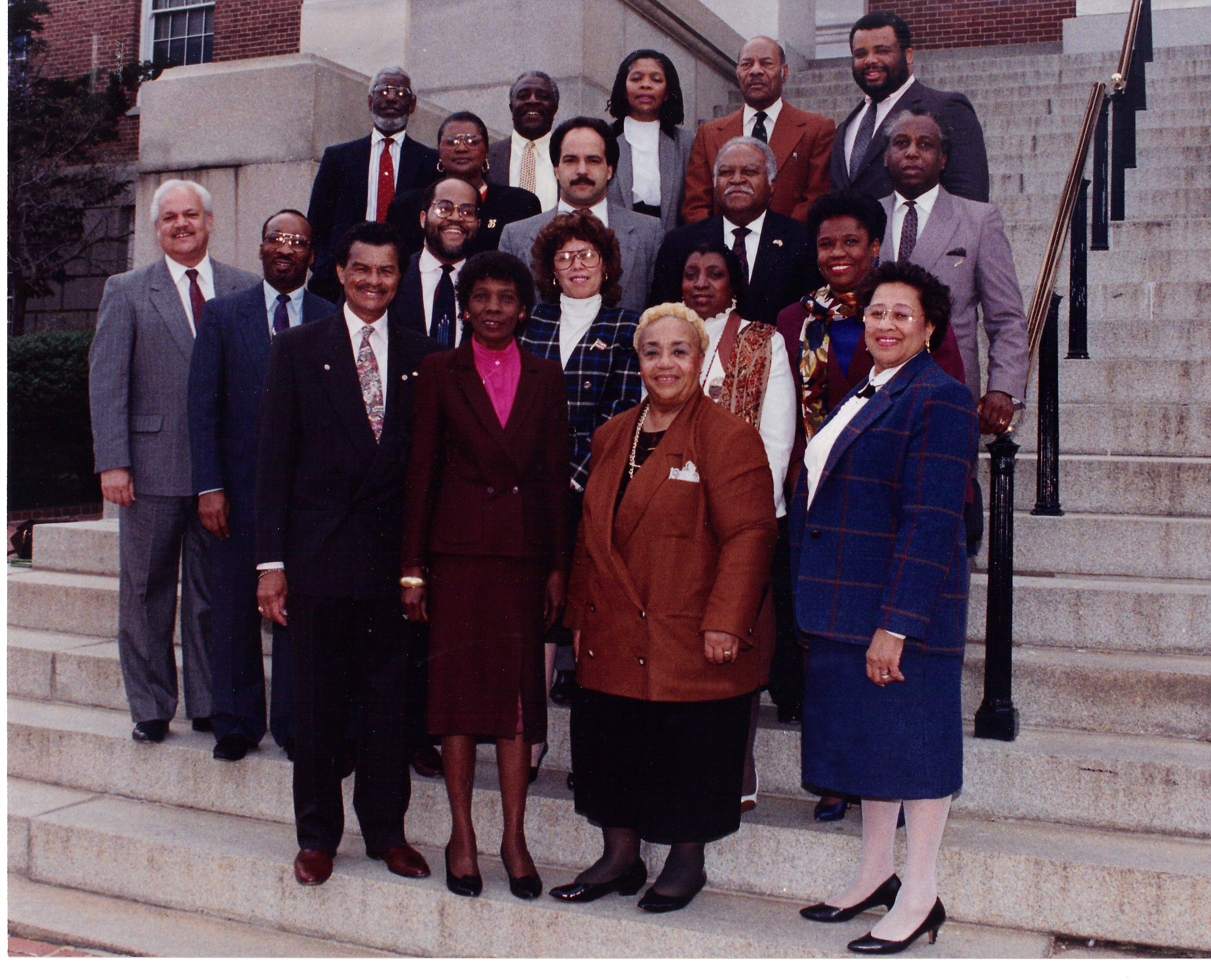
Davis (back row second from left) with the 1992 Legislative Black Caucus of Maryland

Davis first won election to the Maryland House of Delegates in 1982 and was sworn in the following January. He was assigned to the House Ways and Means committee where he served for 24 years.

== Life after politics ==
Davis was the state president of AARP (formally the American Association of Retired Persons) Maryland from April 2012 to 2018.
