= Lucille Maurer =

American politician (1922–1996)

21st Treasurer of Maryland
- In office 1987–1996
- Governor: William Donald Schaefer; Parris Glendening
- Preceded by: William S. James
- Succeeded by: Richard N. Dixon

Member of the Maryland House of Delegates
- In office 1969-1987

Personal details
- Born: Lucille Darvin; 1922 Rockland County, New York, U.S.
- Died: June 17, 1996 (aged 73–74) Silver Spring, Maryland, U.S.
- Party: Democratic
- Spouse: Ely Maurer
- Children: 3
- Education: University of North Carolina (BA); Yale University (MA)

Lucille Maurer (née Darvin; 1922 – June 17, 1996) was the first woman Treasurer of Maryland.

== Life ==
Maurer graduated from the University of North Carolina at Chapel Hill with a Bachelor of Arts in economics, and she worked as an economist at the U.S. Tariff Commission. She obtained a Master of Arts in General Studies from Yale University and moved to Montgomery County, Maryland in 1950.

In 1969, Maurer was appointed to fill a vacancy in the Maryland House of Delegates after serving two terms on the county school board. She was re-elected to several terms, serving as a member of the Ways and Means Committee for sixteen years and chairing the Education Committee and the Tax and Trade Committee. She was known for her work on educational issues, devising a formula to equalize public education funding by increasing state funds for poorer jurisdictions.

Maurer ran for the State Senate in 1986 and lost. In 1987, she was elected by the General Assembly to serve as the state treasurer, winning over Governor Schaefer's favored candidate. She was the 21st elected treasurer of Maryland, and the first woman to serve in that role.

As treasurer for nine years, Maurer implemented modern bookkeeping processes and was praised for her management of the state's stock portfolio.

After being hospitalized with a brain tumor, Maurer resigned from her position in January 1996. She died at her home in Silver Spring, Maryland on June 17, 1996. She was Jewish.

Political offices
Preceded by William S. James	Treasurer of Maryland; 1987–1996	Succeeded by Richard N. Dixon
