= R. Clayton Mitchell Jr. =

American politician (1936–2019)

104th Speaker of the Maryland House of Delegates
- In office 1987–1994
- Preceded by: Benjamin L. Cardin
- Succeeded by: Casper R. Taylor Jr.

Member of the Maryland House of Delegates from the 36th district
- In office 1971–1994

Personal details
- Born: April 16, 1936 Chestertown, Maryland
- Died: June 13, 2019 (aged 83) Kent County, Maryland
- Party: Democratic
- Spouse: Marie Whitsitt (m. 1958; died 2017)
- Children: 3 sons
- Occupation: Farmer, businessman

R. Clayton 'Clay' Mitchell Jr. (April 16, 1936 – June 13, 2019) was an American politician and the Speaker of the Maryland House of Delegates in the United States.

== Background ==
Mitchell was born in Chestertown on Maryland's Eastern Shore in 1936. He served in the United States Army before entering public service in the 1966 elections.

== Political career ==
In 1962, Mitchell won a seat on the Democratic Central Committee in Kent County. In the 1966 elections, Mitchell won a seat on the Kent County Board of Commissioners. He was President of the Board of County Commissioners for 4 years. Four years later (1970), he won election to the Maryland House of Delegates representing District 36, which spreads across the northern Eastern Shore between the Delaware state line and the Chesapeake Bay. He became chair of the Eastern Shore delegation in 1974, and a decade later took over as chairman of the powerful Appropriations Committee. In 1987, after the election of the previous Speaker of the Maryland House of Delegates, Benjamin L. Cardin, to Congress, Mitchell was elected by his colleagues to serve as Speaker. He held the position until his retirement in 1994.

== Retirement ==
After retiring from the House of Delegates, Mitchell continued to be actively involved in his community. He chaired both the Save Our Skipjacks Task Force and the Maryland Commission for Celebration 2000. In addition, he was a Director of the Second National Bank of Maryland and a member of the Board of Visitors and Governors of Washington College. Mitchell died on June 13, 2019.

== Legacy ==
In 2008, the R. Clayton Mitchell Jr. Kent County Government Center in Chestertown was dedicated to Mitchell. In 2018, the Kent Narrows Bridge on US 50/US 301 was also dedicated in his name. In October, 2019, the Comptroller of Maryland established the R. Clayton Mitchell Award for Distinguished Public Service to recognize officials at all levels of government for exceptional public service.

Preceded by Benjamin L. Cardin	Speaker of the Maryland House of Delegates; 1987–1994	Succeeded by Casper R. Taylor Jr.
