= Maryland Democratic Party =

Maryland affiliate of the Democratic Party

- Abbreviation: MDDEM
- Chairperson: Steuart Pittman
- Governor: Wes Moore
- Lieutenant Governor: Aruna Miller
- President of the Senate: Bill Ferguson
- Senate Majority Leader: Nancy J. King
- Speaker of the House: Joseline Peña-Melnyk
- Founded: May 21, 1827; 199 years ago
- Headquarters: Annapolis, Maryland, U.S.
- Membership (2021): ▲2,284,097
- National affiliation: Democratic Party
- Senate: 34 / 47
- House of Delegates: 102 / 141
- U.S. Senate (Maryland seats): 2 / 2
- U.S. House of Representatives (Maryland seats): 7 / 8
- Statewide officers: 4 / 4
- County executives: 6 / 9
- Baltimore City Council: 15 / 15

Election symbol

Website
- mddems.org

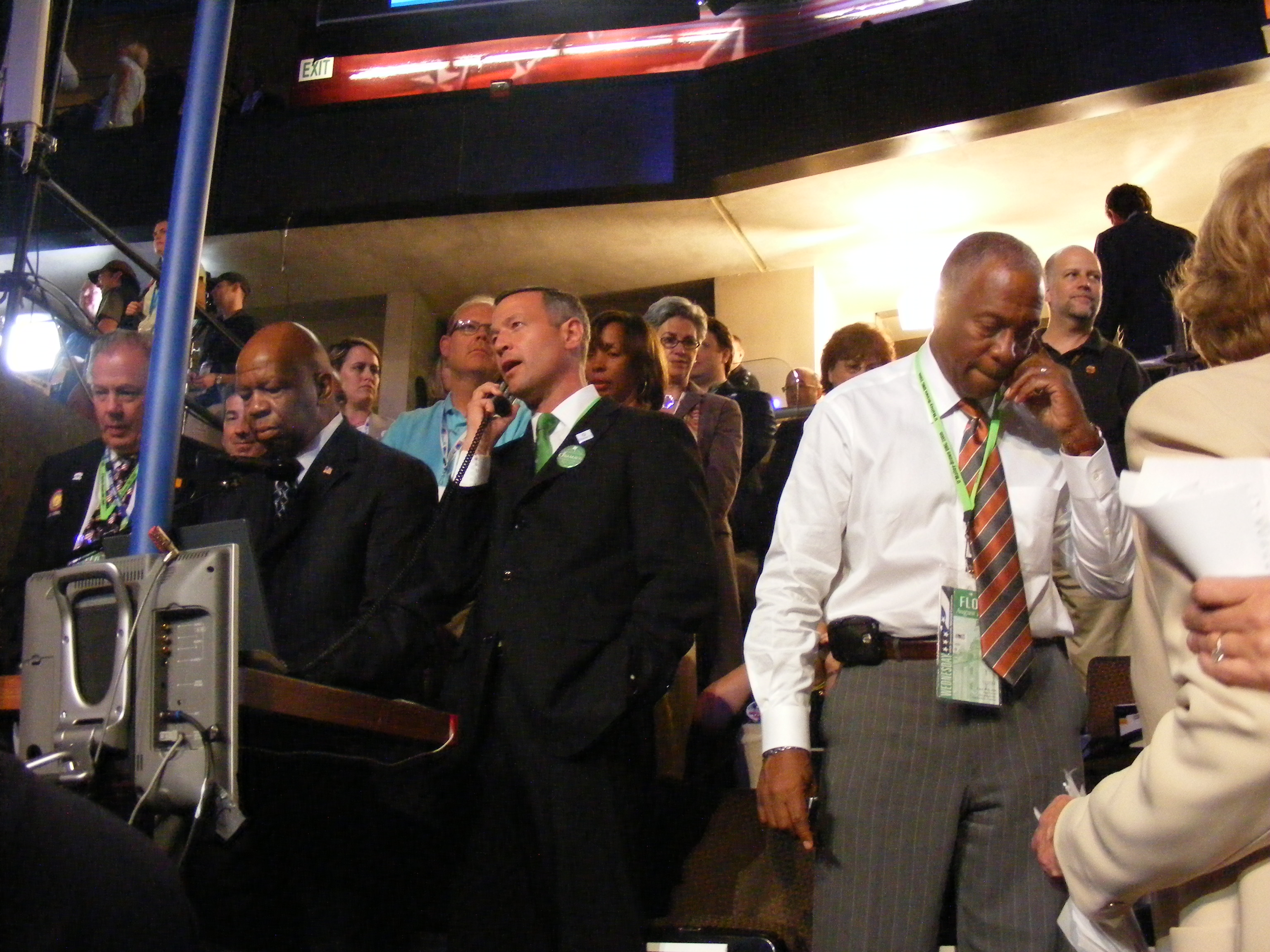
Party leaders Elijah Cummings, Martin O'Malley and Michael Cryor minutes before announcing Maryland's votes at the 2008 Democratic National Convention

The Maryland Democratic Party is the affiliate of the Democratic Party in the state of Maryland, headquartered in Annapolis. The current state party chair is Steuart Pittman. It is currently the dominant party in the state, controlling all but one of Maryland's eight U.S. House seats, both U.S. Senate seats, all statewide executive offices and supermajorities in both houses of the state legislature.

== History ==
The Maryland Democratic Party is among the oldest continuously existing political organizations in the world. On May 21, 1827, a meeting of Andrew Jackson supporters organized a political structure in the state designed to help Jackson win the Presidency after he was denied victory in the 1824 United States presidential election despite winning the popular vote. The first meeting of the Democratic (Jackson) Central Committee was held at the Atheneum in Baltimore, located on the southwest corner of St. Paul and Lexington streets.

Twelve delegates from each county and six delegates from Baltimore were invited to attend. The label "Central Committee" was adopted along with a "Committee of Correspondence" which functioned like the present Executive Committee. Thomas M. Forman, Cecil County, was chosen to preside with William M. Beall, Frederick County, appointed Secretary and John S. Brooke, Prince George's County, appointed as Assistant Secretary. In addition to its founding, the Maryland Democratic Party hosted the first six Democratic National Conventions from 1832 to 1852 held in Baltimore. On May 31, 1838, Maryland Democrats gathered in a state party convention to nominate William Grason for Governor. He became the first popularly elected Governor in Maryland with the help of central committees throughout the state.

After the ratification of the Suffrage Amendment in 1920, the Democratic State Central Committee added an equal number of women to its membership, a practice still embodied in National Party Rules and in the elections for Cecil County Democratic State Central Committee.

The first six Democratic National Conventions were held in Baltimore, for a total of nine to date.

Historically the Democratic Party has been the dominant party in Maryland politics. Since the 1838 Maryland gubernatorial election, the first gubernatorial election in Maryland in which the governor was elected by direct popular vote, 28 Maryland Governors have been Democrats. Since the 1895 Maryland Comptroller election, the first Comptroller election in Maryland in which the Comptroller was elected by direct popular vote, 17 Maryland Comptrollers have been Democrats. Since the 1895 Maryland Attorney General election, the first Attorney General election in Maryland in which the Attorney General was elected by direct popular vote, 23 Attorneys General have been Democrats. The party has held continuous control of the Maryland General Assembly since 1920, the longest currently running streak of control by a single party of a state legislature in the United States.

== Elected officials ==
=== Members of Congress ===
Democrats comprise nine of Maryland's ten-member congressional delegation:

==== U.S. Senate ====
Since 1987, Democrats have controlled both of Maryland's seats in the U.S. Senate:

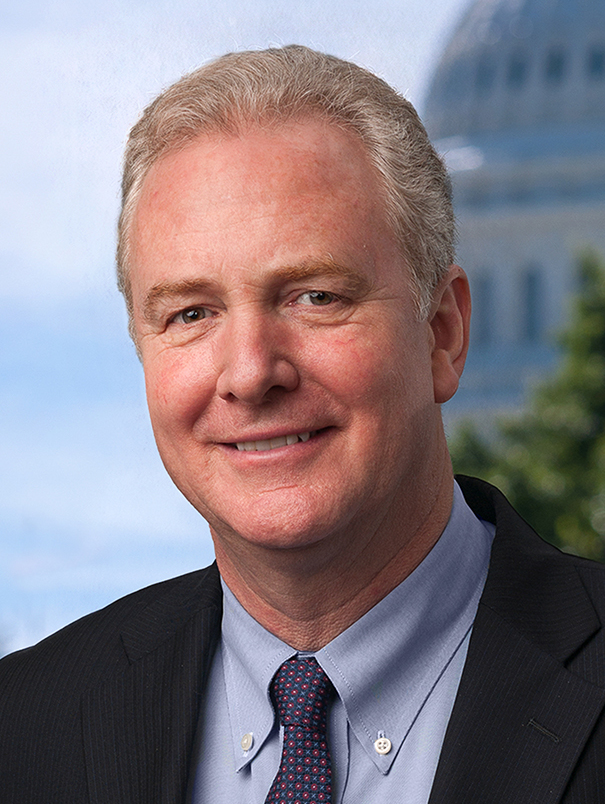
Senior U.S. Senator Chris Van Hollen

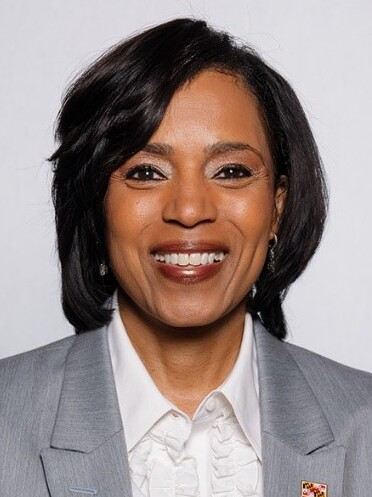
Junior U.S. Senator Angela Alsobrooks

==== U.S. House of Representatives ====
Democrats hold seven of the eight seats Maryland is apportioned in the U.S. House following the 2000 census:

District	Member	Photo
2nd	Johnny Olszewski	
3rd	Sarah Elfreth	
4th	Glenn Ivey	
5th	Steny Hoyer	
5th	Adrian Boafo (elect)	
6th	April McClain Delaney	
7th	Kweisi Mfume	
8th	Jamie Raskin	

=== Statewide officeholders ===
Beginning in January 2023, Democrats control all four statewide offices:

- Governor: Wes Moore
- Lieutenant Governor: Aruna Miller
- Attorney General: Anthony Brown
- Comptroller: Brooke Lierman
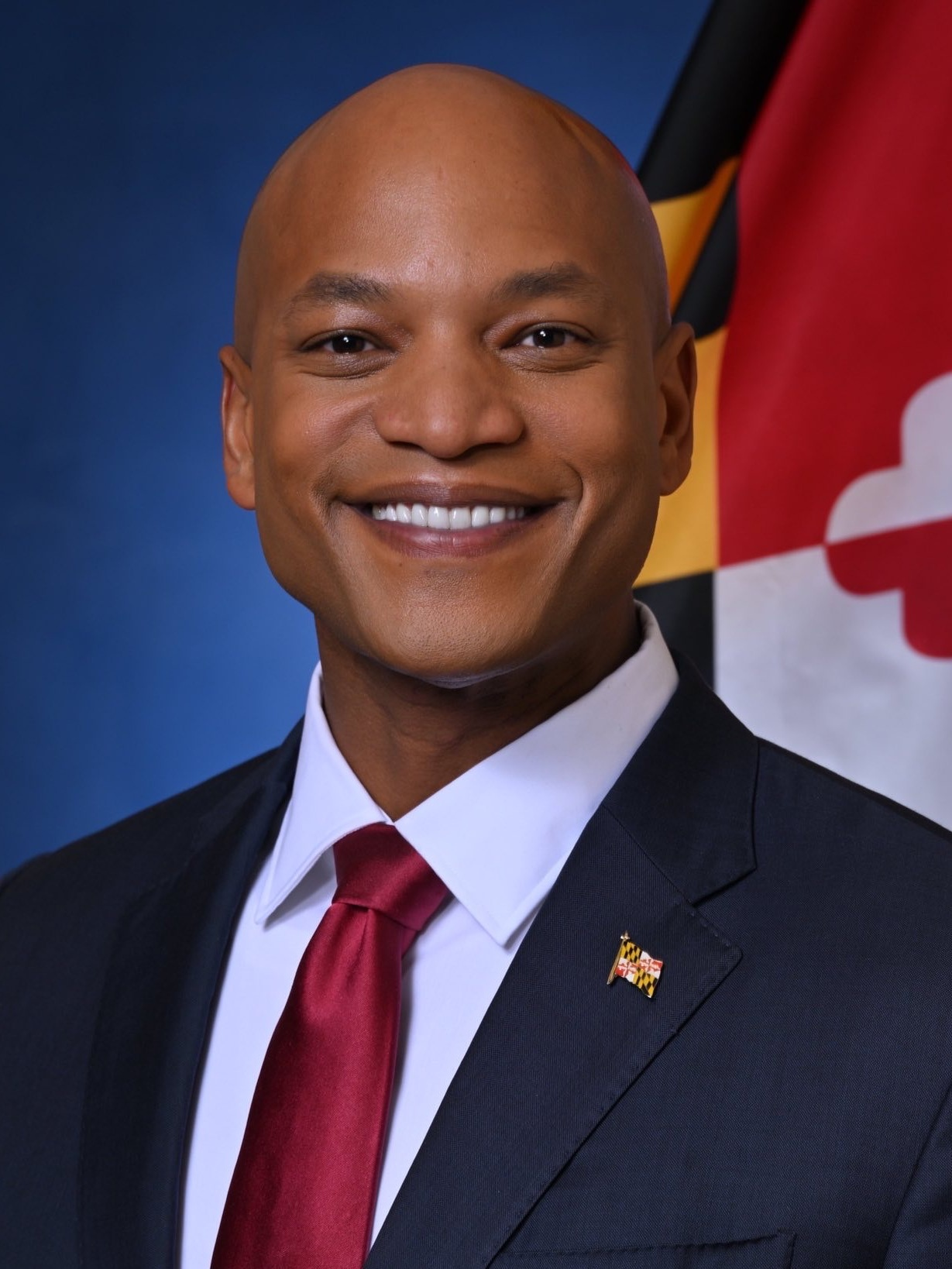
Wes Moore

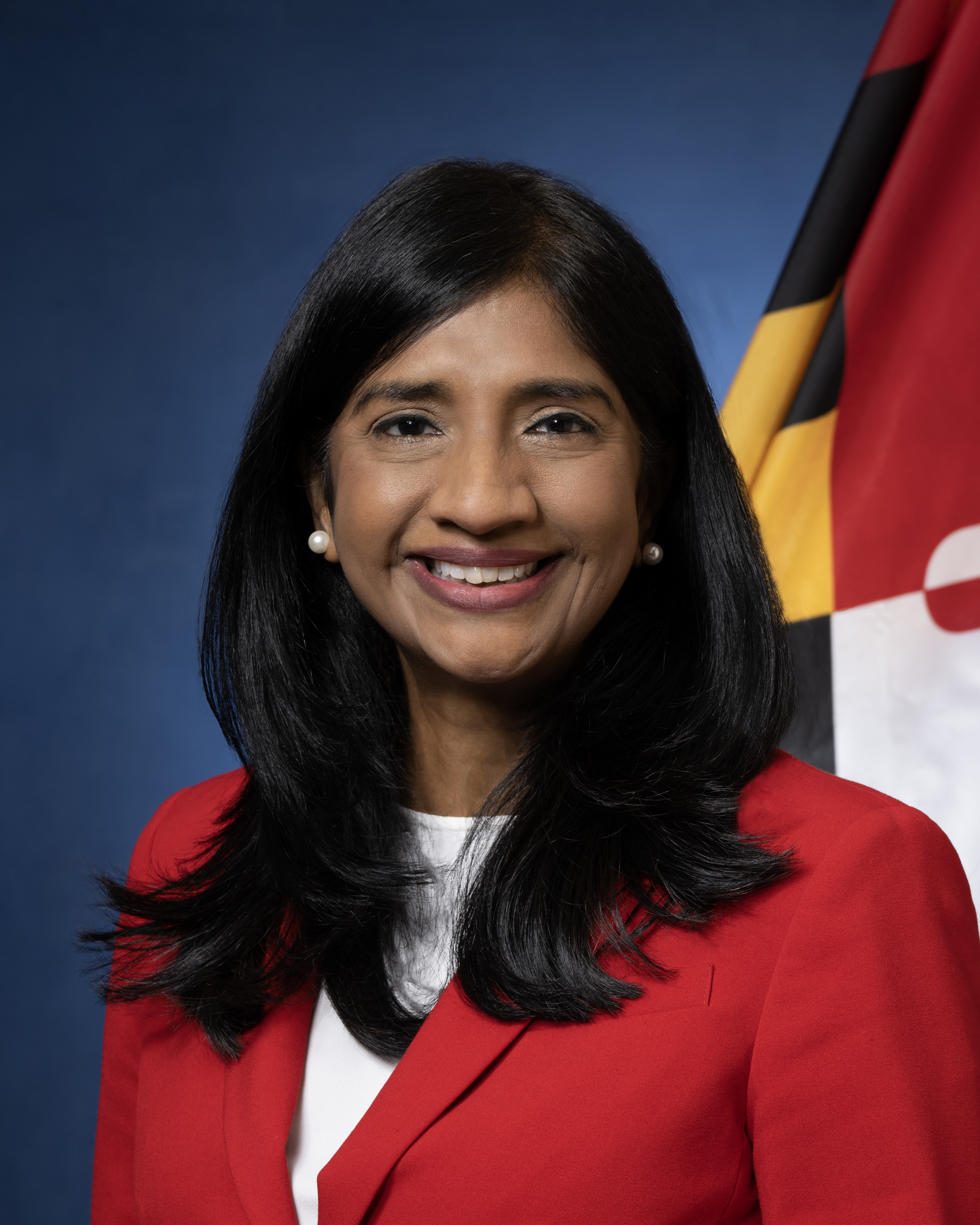
Aruna Miller

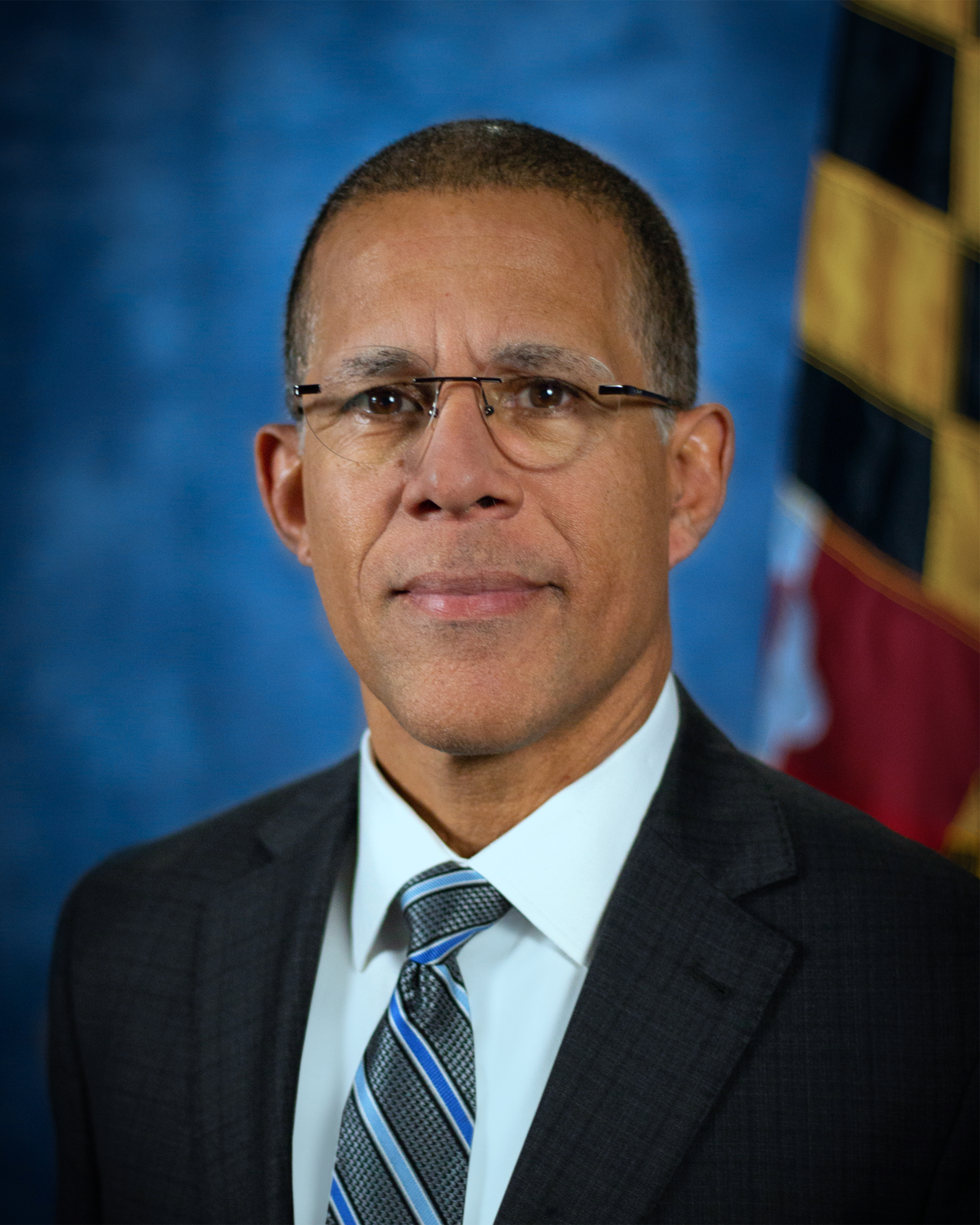
Anthony Brown

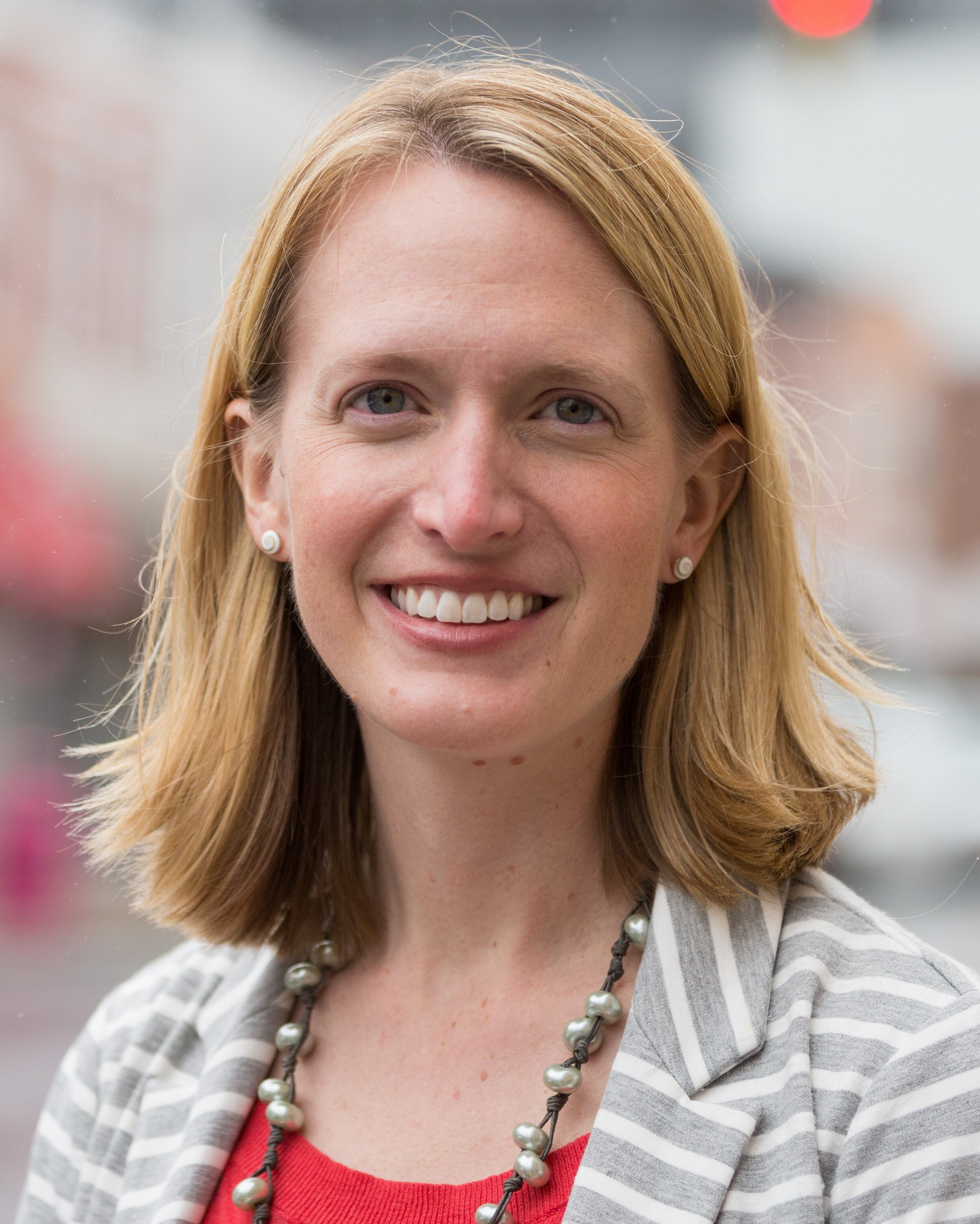
Brooke Lierman

=== County government ===
Partisan control of county councils and boards of commissioners as of 2024 Democratic incumbent Republican incumbent

Until 2010, the Democratic Party of Maryland held majority power at the County level. As of 2024, Democrats hold a majority of the seats on the county councils of seven counties (Anne Arundel County, Baltimore County, the city of Baltimore, Frederick County, Howard County, Montgomery County, and Prince George's County) and the Charles County Board of Commissioners. The party also holds county executive offices in Anne Arundel County, Baltimore County, Frederick County, Howard County, Montgomery County, and Prince George's County.

=== Legislative leadership ===
- President of the Senate: Bill Ferguson
- President Pro Tempore of the Senate: Malcolm Augustine
- Senate Majority Leader: Nancy J. King
- Speaker of the House of Delegates: Joseline Peña-Melnyk
- Speaker Pro Tempore of the House of Delegates: Luke Clippinger
- House Majority Leader: David Moon
- House Majority Whip: Ashanti Martinez

=== Mayors ===
- Annapolis: Jared Littmann
- Baltimore: Brandon Scott

== Electoral performance ==
=== Federal ===
==== Presidential ====
Maryland Democratic Party presidential election results
Election	Presidential ticket	Votes	Vote %	Electoral votes	Result
1960	John F. Kennedy/Lyndon B. Johnson	565,808	53.61%	9 / 9	Won
1964	Lyndon B. Johnson/Hubert Humphrey	730,912	65.47%	10 / 10	Won
1968	Hubert Humphrey/Edmund Muskie	538,310	43.59%	10 / 10	Lost
1972	George McGovern/Sargent Shriver	505,781	37.36%	0 / 10	Lost
1976	Jimmy Carter/Walter Mondale	759,612	53.04%	10 / 10	Won
1980	Jimmy Carter/Walter Mondale	726,161	47.12%	10 / 10	Lost
1984	Walter Mondale/Geraldine Ferraro	787,935	47.02%	0 / 10	Lost
1988	Michael Dukakis/Lloyd Bentsen	826,304	48.20%	0 / 10	Lost
1992	Bill Clinton/Al Gore	988,571	49.80%	10 / 10	Won
1996	Bill Clinton/Al Gore	966,207	54.25%	10 / 10	Won
2000	Al Gore/Joe Lieberman	1,145,782	56.57%	10 / 10	Lost
2004	John Kerry/John Edwards	1,334,493	55.91%	10 / 10	Lost
2008	Barack Obama/Joe Biden	1,629,467	61.92%	10 / 10	Won
2012	Barack Obama/Joe Biden	1,677,844	61.97%	10 / 10	Won
2016	Hillary Clinton/Tim Kaine	1,677,928	60.33%	10 / 10	Lost
2020	Joe Biden/Kamala Harris	1,985,023	65.36%	10 / 10	Won
2024	Kamala Harris/Tim Walz	1,902,577	62.62%	10 / 10	Lost

==== U.S. House ====
Election	Votes	%	Seats (MD)	±	%
2016	1,636,281	60.43	7 / 8	0	2.99
2018	1,493,047	65.30	7 / 8	0	4.87
2020	1,912,740	64.75	7 / 8	0	0.55
2022	1,291,481	64.71	7 / 8	0	0.06
2024	1,863,416	63.48	7 / 8	0	1.23
2026	1,741,049	69.37	7 / 8	0	55.89

=== State ===
==== Executive offices ====
Governor
Election	Candidate/ticket	Votes	%	Result
1950	William Preston Lane Jr.	275,824	42.74%	Lost ✗
1954	Curley Byrd	319,033	45.54%	Lost ✗
1958	J. Millard Tawes	485,061	63.55%	Won ✓
1962	J. Millard Tawes	428,071	55.64%	Won ✓
1966	George P. Mahoney	373,543	40.61%	Lost ✗
1970	Marvin Mandel	639,579	65.73%	Won ✓
1974	Marvin Mandel/Blair Lee III	602,648	63.50%	Won ✓
1978	Harry Hughes/Samuel Bogley	705,910	70.62%	Won ✓
1982	Harry Hughes/J. Joseph Curran Jr.	705,910	61.97%	Won ✓
1986	William Donald Schaefer/Melvin Steinberg	907,291	82.37%	Won ✓
1990	William Donald Schaefer/Melvin Steinberg	664,015	59.76%	Won ✓
1994	Parris Glendening/Kathleen Kennedy Townsend	708,094	50.21%	Won ✓
1998	Parris Glendening/Kathleen Kennedy Townsend	846,972	55.14%	Won ✓
2002	Kathleen Kennedy Townsend/Charles R. Larson	813,422	47.68%	Lost ✗
2006	Martin O'Malley/Anthony Brown	942,279	52.69%	Won ✓
2010	Martin O'Malley/Anthony Brown	1,044,961	56.24%	Won ✓
2014	Anthony Brown/Kenneth Ulman	818,890	47.25%	Lost ✗
2018	Ben Jealous/Susan Turnbull	1,002,639	43.51%	Lost ✗
2022	Wes Moore/Aruna Miller	1,293,944	64.53%	Won ✓
2026	Wes Moore/Aruna Miller	1,313,420	63.9%	Won ✓

Attorney General
Year	Candidate	Votes	%	Result
2014	Brian Frosh	935,846	55.8%	Won ✓
2018	Brian Frosh	1,474,833	64.81%	Won ✓
2022	Anthony Brown	1,287,418	64.95%	Won ✓
2026	Anthony Brown	1,416,665	68.6%	Won ✓

Comptroller
Year	Candidate	Votes	%	Result
2014	Peter Franchot	1,061,267	62.7%	Won ✓
2018	Peter Franchot	1,620,264	72.07%	Won ✓
2022	Brooke Lierman	1,223,044	61.56%	Won ✓
2026	Brooke Lierman	1,404,833	68.5%	Won ✓

== Party organization ==
=== Party chairs (1988–present) ===
- Steuart Pittman (2025–present)
- Charlene Dukes (acting) (2025)
- Kenneth Ulman (2023–2025)
- Everett Browning (acting) (2023)
- Yvette Lewis (2019–2023)
- Cory McCray (acting) (2019)
- Maya Rockeymoore Cummings (2018–2019)
- Kathleen Matthews, (2017-2018)
- Bruce Poole (2015–2017)
- Yvette Lewis (2011–2015)
- Peter O'Malley (2011)
- Susan Turnbull (2009–2011)
- Michael Cryor (2007–2009)
- Terry Lierman (2004–2007)
- Ike Leggett (2002–2004)
- Wayne Rogers (2000–2002)
- Peter B. Krauser (1997–2000)
- Gov. Harry Hughes (1994–1997)
- Vera Hall (1993–1994)
- Nate Landow (1988–1993)

=== Party officers ===
- Party Chair: Steuart Pittman
- First Vice Chair: Charlene Dukes
- Second Vice Chair: Elaine McNeil
- Third Vice Chair: Ruben Amaya
- Treasurer: Devang Shah
- Secretary: Corynne Courpas
- Deputy Treasurer: Diana Emerson
- Deputy Secretary: Gabe Gough
- Parliamentarian: Greg Pecorara
- DNC Member: Bel Leong-Hong
- DNC Member: Robbie Leonard
- DNC Member: Bob Kresslein
- DNC Member: Cheryl S. Landis

=== Party staff ===
- Executive Director: Karen Darkes

== Affiliated groups ==
- United Democratic Women's Clubs of Maryland
- Young Democrats of Maryland
- Maryland High School Democrats
- Democratic Women's PAC of Maryland
- United Democrats of Frederick County
- Green Dems
- Democratic Party (United States)

== See also ==
- Political party strength in Maryland
