= 2018 Maryland Attorney General election =

2018 Maryland Attorney General Election
- November 6, 2018
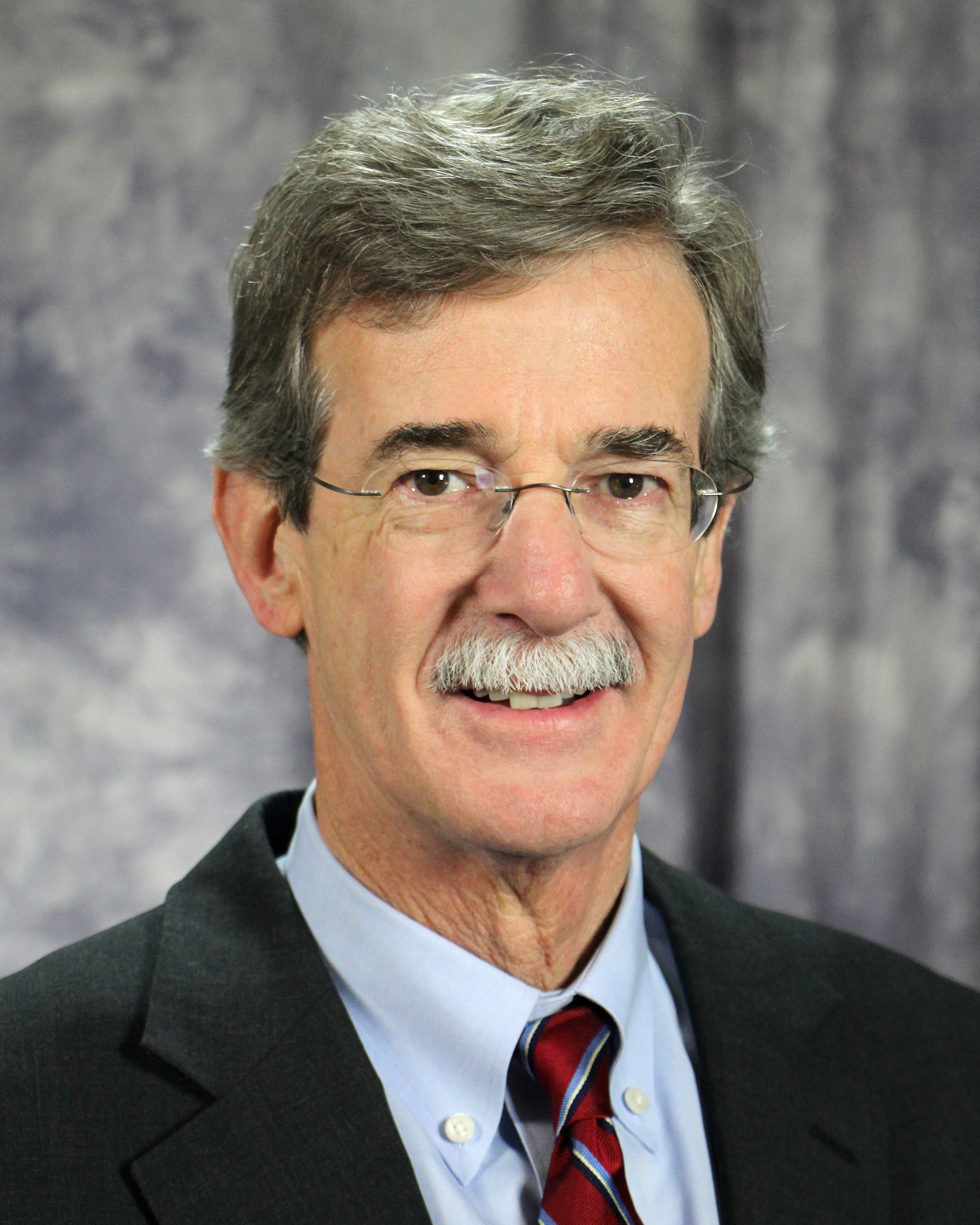

| Nominee | Brian Frosh | Craig Wolf |
| Party | Democratic | Republican |
| Popular vote | 1,474,833 | 799,035 |
| Percentage | 64.81% | 35.11% |
- Frosh: 50–60% 60–70% 70–80% 80–90% >90% Wolf: 50–60% 60–70% 70–80% 80–90% >90% Tie: 50% No data
Attorney General before election
Brian Frosh
Democratic
Elected Attorney General
Brian Frosh
Democratic

The Maryland Attorney General election of 2018 was held on November 6, 2018, to elect the attorney general of Maryland. Incumbent Democratic Attorney General Brian Frosh was eligible to seek a second term in office, filed for re-election on February 15, 2018, and was unopposed for the Democratic nomination. Republican former prosecutor and trade group CEO Craig Wolf was unopposed for the Republican nomination. Brian Frosh won with 64.8% of the vote.

== Democratic primary ==
=== Candidates ===
==== Declared ====
- Brian Frosh, incumbent attorney general

=== Results ===
Democratic primary results
| Party | Candidate | Votes | % |
|---|---|---|---|
| Democratic | Brian Frosh (incumbent) | 505,897 | 100.0 |

== Republican primary ==
=== Candidates ===
==== Declared ====
- Craig Wolf, former prosecutor and trade group CEO

=== Endorsements ===
Craig Wolf

State officials

- Larry Hogan, governor

Organizations

- Maryland Fraternal Order of Police

=== Results ===
Republican primary results
| Party | Candidate | Votes | % |
|---|---|---|---|
| Republican | Craig Wolf | 175,429 | 100.0 |

== General election ==
=== Candidates ===
- Brian Frosh (Democratic), incumbent Maryland Attorney General
- Craig Wolf (Republican), former prosecutor and trade group CEO

=== Predictions ===
| Source | Ranking | As of |
|---|---|---|
| Governing | Likely D | October 26, 2018 |

=== Polling ===
| Poll source | Date(s) administered | Sample size | Margin of error | Brian Frosh (D) | Craig Wolf (R) | Undecided |
|---|---|---|---|---|---|---|
| Gonzales Research | October 1–6, 2018 | 806 | ± 3.5% | 43% | 34% | 23% |
| Goucher College | September 11–16, 2018 | 472 | ± 4.5% | 58% | 26% | 12% |

=== Results ===
Maryland Attorney General election, 2018
| Party | Candidate | Votes | % | ±% |
|---|---|---|---|---|
| Democratic | Brian Frosh (incumbent) | 1,474,833 | 64.81% | +9.01% |
| Republican | Craig Wolf | 799,035 | 35.11% | −5.57% |
| Write-in | | 1,920 | 0.08% | -0.04% |
| Total votes | | 2,275,788 | 100.0% | N/A |
| Democratic hold | | | | |

==== By congressional district ====
Frosh won seven of eight congressional districts.

| District | Frosh | Wolf | Elected Representative |
|---|---|---|---|
| 1st | 38% | 62% | Andy Harris |
| 2nd | 65% | 35% | Dutch Ruppersberger |
| 3rd | 67% | 33% | John Sarbanes |
| 4th | 79% | 21% | Anthony Brown |
| 5th | 68% | 32% | Steny Hoyer |
| 6th | 60% | 40% | David Trone |
| 7th | 76% | 24% | Elijah Cummings |
| 8th | 68% | 32% | Jamie Raskin |

== See also ==
- 2018 United States elections
- 2018 Maryland gubernatorial election
- 2018 Maryland Comptroller election
