= 2006 Maryland Comptroller election =

- November 7, 2006
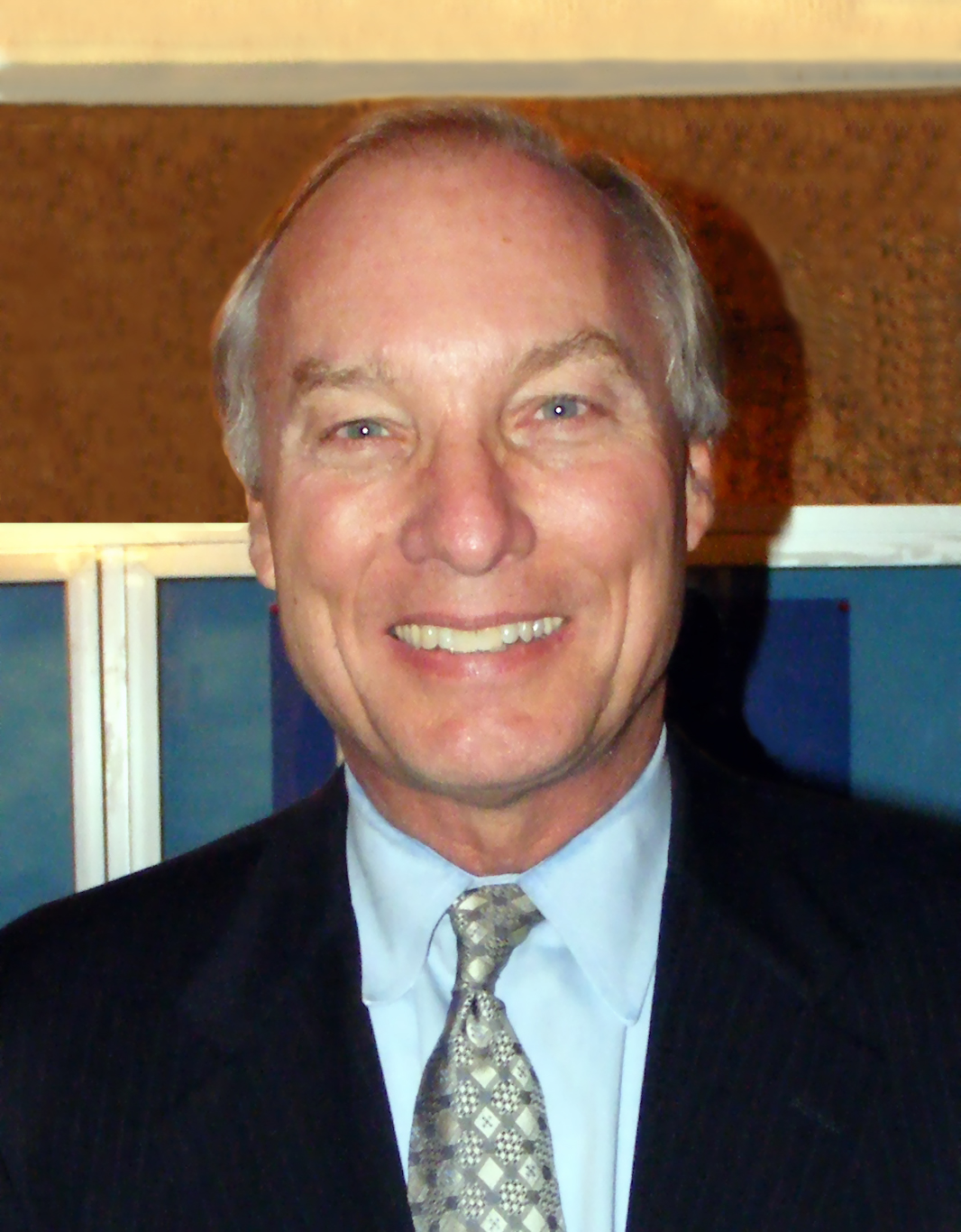

Nominee	Peter Franchot	Anne McCarthy
Party	Democratic	Republican
Popular vote	1,016,677	703,874
Percentage	59.0%	40.8%
- Franchot: 40–50% 50–60% 60–70% 80–90% McCarthy: 50–60% 60–70%
Comptroller before election
William Donald Schaefer
Democratic
Elected Comptroller
Peter Franchot
Democratic

The 2006 Maryland Comptroller election was held on November 7, 2006. Incumbent Democratic State Comptroller William Donald Schaefer ran for a third term, but was defeated in the Democratic primary by Peter Franchot, a State Delegate from Montgomery County. On the Republican side, Anne McCarthy, the former dean of the University of Baltimore business school, won a crowded primary and faced off against Franchot. In the general election, Franchot defeated McCarthy and became the next Comptroller of Maryland.

== Democratic primary ==
=== Candidates ===
- Peter Franchot, State Delegate from Montgomery County, Maryland
- Janet S. Owens, County Executive of Anne Arundel County, Maryland
- William Donald Schaefer, incumbent Comptroller of Maryland, 58th governor of Maryland, Mayor of Baltimore, and City Councilman

=== Campaign ===
In 2006, William Donald Schaefer, running for a third term as Maryland State Comptroller, faced his first legitimate opponents in decades, putting his political career in peril.

He was attacked by Baltimore mayor Martin O'Malley for his close relationship with Republican governor Bob Ehrlich, who noted, "He works very hard to give the Ehrlich administration cover. I think he probably prides himself at the degree to which he helps cover up the poor performance of the governor." Schaefer added to his troubles when he announced, "I don't want to adjust to another language. This is the United States. I think [immigrants to the United States] should adjust to us," at a meeting of the Maryland Board of Public Works, prompted by an experience he recently had at a McDonald's restaurant. He noted later that his remarks would cause him to "likely lose all the Latin votes and all the other votes." Another controversy arose in February 2006 when Schaefer made inappropriate remarks to an aide at another meeting of the Board of Public Works. As the aide brought him a cup of tea, he watched her walk away before requesting that she "walk again." Not long after the incident, Schaefer apologized to the aide, but opponent Peter Franchot remarked, "He's apologizing for the negative publicity rather than his inappropriate behavior."

As the campaign progressed, Schaefer ended up in hot water yet again for remarks made about his other opponent in the Democratic primary, Janet Owens. Schaefer remarked to a columnist for The Washington Post that Owens wore "long dresses, looks like Mother Hubbard--it's sort of like she was a man." Owens later called the remarks "coarse and insulting." Schaefer addressed the controversy in a radio advertisement, where he said, "I've...said some things I shouldn't. But I never meant to offend anyone. And if I did, I apologize." Franchot joined Owens in attacking Schaefer for his remarks, adding, "It's just another example of why William Donald Schaefer should not be reelected."

The Baltimore Sun endorsed Franchot for the position, observing, "[Franchot] has a strong grasps of budget intricacies and an appetite to shed light on corporate income tax loopholes...he will be a strong advocate for the interests of the taxpayer both on and off the Board of Public Works."

Ultimately, Schaefer was defeated in his bid for re-election, coming in third place behind Franchot and Owens.

=== Results ===
Democratic Primary results
Party	Candidate	Votes	%
Democratic	Peter Franchot	215,192	36.50
Democratic	Janet S. Owens	200,292	33.97
Democratic	William Donald Schaefer (incumbent)	174,071	29.53
Total votes		589,555	100.00

== Republican primary ==
=== Candidates ===
- Anne McCarthy, former dean of the Robert G. Merrick School of Business at the University of Baltimore
- Stephen N. Abrams
- Mark Spradley
- Gene Zarwell

=== Results ===
Republican Primary results
Party	Candidate	Votes	%
Republican	Anne M. McCarthy	76,484	43.00
Republican	Stephen N. Abrams	64,884	36.48
Republican	Mark M. Spradley	22,673	12.75
Republican	Gene Zarwell	13,840	7.78
Total votes			100

== General election ==
=== Polling ===
Source	Date	Franchot (D)	McCarthy (R)
Baltimore Sun/Potomac Inc.	September 27, 2006	54%	29%

=== Results ===
Maryland Comptroller election, 2006
Party	Candidate	Votes	%	±%
Democratic	Peter Franchot	1,016,677	58.97%	−8.96%
Republican	Anne McCarthy	703,874	40.83%	+9.27%
Write-ins		3,447	0.20%	
Majority		312,803	18.14%	−18.23%
Turnout		1,723,998		
Democratic hold		Swing		
