= 2014 Maryland Attorney General election =

2014 Maryland Attorney General Election
- November 4, 2014
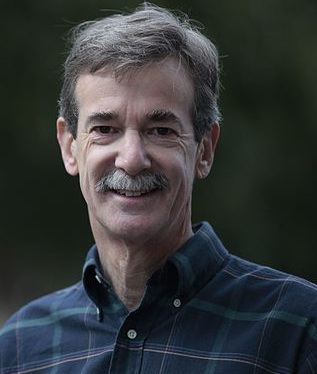

Nominee	Brian Frosh	Jeffrey Pritzker
Party	Democratic	Republican
Popular vote	935,846	682,265
Percentage	55.8%	40.7%
- Frosh: 40–50% 50–60% 60–70% 70–80% 80–90% >90% Pritzker: 40–50% 50–60% 60–70% 70–80% 80–90% >90% Tie: 50%
Attorney General before election
Doug Gansler
Democratic
Elected Attorney General
Brian Frosh
Democratic

The Maryland Attorney General election of 2014 was held on November 4, 2014, to elect the Attorney General of Maryland. Incumbent Democratic Attorney General Doug Gansler was eligible to seek a third term in office, but instead ran unsuccessfully for the Democratic nomination for Governor of Maryland.

Primary elections were held on June 24, 2014. The Democrats nominated State Senator Brian Frosh and the Republicans nominated attorney Jeffrey Pritzker.

== Democratic primary ==
=== Candidates ===
==== Declared ====
- Aisha Braveboy, state delegate
- Jon Cardin, state delegate and nephew of U.S. Senator Ben Cardin
- Brian Frosh, state senator

==== Withdrew ====
- William Frick, state delegate (ran for re-election)

==== Declined ====
- Doug Gansler, incumbent attorney general (ran for Governor)

=== Endorsements ===
Jon Cardin

Organizations

- Baltimore Interdenominational Ministerial Alliance
- The Maryland Multi-Housing Association
- The Greater Baltimore Muslim Council
- Baltimore Grove Democratic Club
- Baltimore County Firefighters Local 1311
- The Baltimore County Seal Democratic Club

Federal politicians

- U.S. Senator Ben Cardin (D-MD)

Members of Congress

- U.S. Representative Dutch Ruppersberger (D-MD)

Maryland State Delegates

- Delegate Talmadge Branch
- Delegate Eric Bromwell
- Delegate Keiffer J. Mitchell, Jr.
- Delegate Dan K. Morhaim
- Delegate Doyle L. Niemann
- Delegate John A. Olszewski, Jr.
- Delegate Dana M. Stein
- Delegate Pam Beidle
Brian Frosh

Former Maryland Attorneys General

- J. Joseph Curran
- Stephen H. Sachs

National Leaders

- Michael Bloomberg

Members of Congress

- Elijah Cummings
- Chris Van Hollen

State-wide elected officials

- Governor Martin O'Malley

Maryland State Delegates

- Delegate Curt Anderson
- Delegate Charlie Barkley
- Delegate Liz Bobo
- Delegate Luke Clippinger
- Delegate Norm Conway
- Delegate Bonnie Cullison
- Delegate Kathleen M. Dumais
- Delegate Barbara Frush
- Delegate Tawanna Gaines
- Delegate Cheryl Glenn
- Delegate Guy Guzzone
- Delegate Pete Hammen
- Delegate Shelia Hixson
- Delegate James Hubbard
- Delegate Tom Hucker
- Delegate Anne Kaiser
- Delegate Ariana Kelly
- Delegate Susan Lee
- Delegate Eric Luedtke
- Delegate Brian McHale
- Delegate Maggie McIntosh
- Delegate Shane Pendergrass
- Delegate Joseph F. Vallario, Jr.

Maryland State Senators

- Senator John Astle
- Senator Joanne Benson
- Senator James Brochin
- Senator Joan Carter Conway
- Senator Ed DeGrange
- Senator Roy Dyson
- Senator Brian Feldman
- Senator Bill Ferguson
- Senator Jennie Forehand
- Senator Lisa Gladden
- Senator Verna Jones-Rodwell
- Senator Ed Kasemeyer
- Senator Delores Kelley
- Senator Nancy King
- Senator Richard Madaleno, Jr.
- Senator Roger Manno
- Senator Nathaniel McFadden
- Senator Thomas Mac Middleton
- Senator Karen S. Montgomery
- Senator Paul G. Pinsky
- Senator Catherine Pugh
- Senator Victor Ramirez
- Senator Jamie Raskin
- Senator James Robey
- Senator Jim Rosapepe
- Senator Ron Young

Local elected officials

- Rushern Baker, Prince George's County Executive
- Angela Alsobrooks, Prince George's County State's Attorney
- Michael Bloomberg, former mayor of New York City

Organizations

- Maryland State Education Association
- AFSCME Maryland
- African American Democratic Club of Montgomery County
- Brady Campaign to Prevent Gun Violence
- CASA in Action
- Central Baltimore County Democratic Club
- Clean Water Action
- Coalition of Asian Pacific American Democrats of Maryland (CAPAD-MD)
- Columbia Democratic Club
- Equality Maryland
- Fraternal Order of Police, Prince George’s County (Lodge 89)
- Fraternal Order of Police, Prince George’s Deputy Sheriff's Association (Lodge 112)
- Fraternal Order of Police, Maryland-National Capital Park Police (Lodge 30)
- Hispanic Democratic Club of Montgomery County
- Maryland Association of Realtors
- Maryland League of Conservation Voters
- Maryland NOW (National Organization for Women) PAC
- Maryland State Education Association (MSEA)
- Montgomery County Career Fire Fighters Association (IAFF) Local 1664
- Montgomery County Fraternal Order of Police (Lodge 35)
- Montgomery County Green Democrats
- Prince George’s County Correctional Officers Association
- Prince George’s County Police Civilian Employees Association
- Professional Fire Fighters of Maryland
- Progressive Maryland
- Progressive Neighbors
- SEIU Maryland-DC State Council
- Sierra Club- Maryland Chapter
- Southwest Baltimore County Democratic Club
- Teamsters Joint Council 55 (Locals 67, 73, 96, 639, 932)
- The Brickyard Coalition
- Thurgood Marshall Democratic Club (TMDC) of Howard County
- UFCW Local 1994 MCGEO
- Western Howard County and Ellicott City and Democratic Club
- 10th District Democratic Club, Baltimore County

Newspapers

- The Washington Post
- The Baltimore Sun

=== Polling ===
Poll source	Date(s) administered	Sample size	Margin of error	Aisha Braveboy	Jon Cardin	William Frick	Brian Frosh	Undecided
The Washington Post	June 5–8, 2014	487	± 5%	13%	26%	—	20%	40%
The Baltimore Sun	May 31–June 3, 2014	499	± 4.4%	7%	26%	—	16%	42%
Washington Post	February 13–16, 2014	1,002	± 5.5%	12%	21%	4%	5%	40%
The Baltimore Sun	February 8–12, 2014	500	± 4.4%	4%	18%	3%	6%	69%
Gonzales Research	October 1–14, 2013	403	± 5%	8.2%	25.1%	5.2%	13.2%	48.4%

=== Results ===
Frosh: 20–30% 30–40% 40–50% 50–60% 60–70%
Cardin: 20–30% 30–40% 40–50% 50–60%
Braveboy: 40–50%

Democratic primary results
Party	Candidate	Votes	%
Democratic	Brian Frosh	228,360	49.58
Democratic	Jon Cardin	139,582	30.3
Democratic	Aisha Braveboy	92,664	20.12
Total votes		460,606	100

== Republican primary ==
=== Candidates ===
==== Declared ====
- Jeffrey Pritzker, attorney and candidate for attorney general in 2002

==== Declined ====
- Richard Douglas, attorney, former Deputy Assistant Secretary of Defense and candidate for the U.S. Senate in 2012

=== Results ===
Republican primary results
Party	Candidate	Votes	%
Republican	Jeffrey Pritzker	166,885	100
Total votes		166,885	100

== General election ==
=== Candidates ===
- Brian Frosh (Democratic), state senator
- Jeffrey Pritzker (Republican), attorney and candidate for attorney general in 2002
- Leo Wayne Dymowski (Libertarian), Democratic candidate for the state house in 1982, Republican candidate for Baltimore City Council in 1991 and Libertarian nominee for Maryland's 2nd congressional district in 2012

=== Polling ===
Poll source	Date(s) administered	Sample size	Margin of error	Brian Frosh (D)	Jeffrey Pritzker (R)	Leo Wayne Dymowski (L)	Undecided
Washington Post	October 2–5, 2014	549	± 5%	49%	26%	5%	19%

=== Results ===
Maryland Attorney General election, 2014
Party	Candidate	Votes	%
Democratic	Brian Frosh	935,846	55.8
Republican	Jeffrey Pritzker	682,265	40.68
Libertarian	Leo Wayne Dymowski	57,069	3.4
Write-ins		2,089	0.12
Majority		253,581	15.12%
Total votes		1,677,269	100
Democratic hold			

== See also ==
- 2014 United States elections
- 2014 Maryland gubernatorial election
- 2014 Maryland Comptroller election
