= 2018 Maryland Comptroller election =

- November 6, 2018
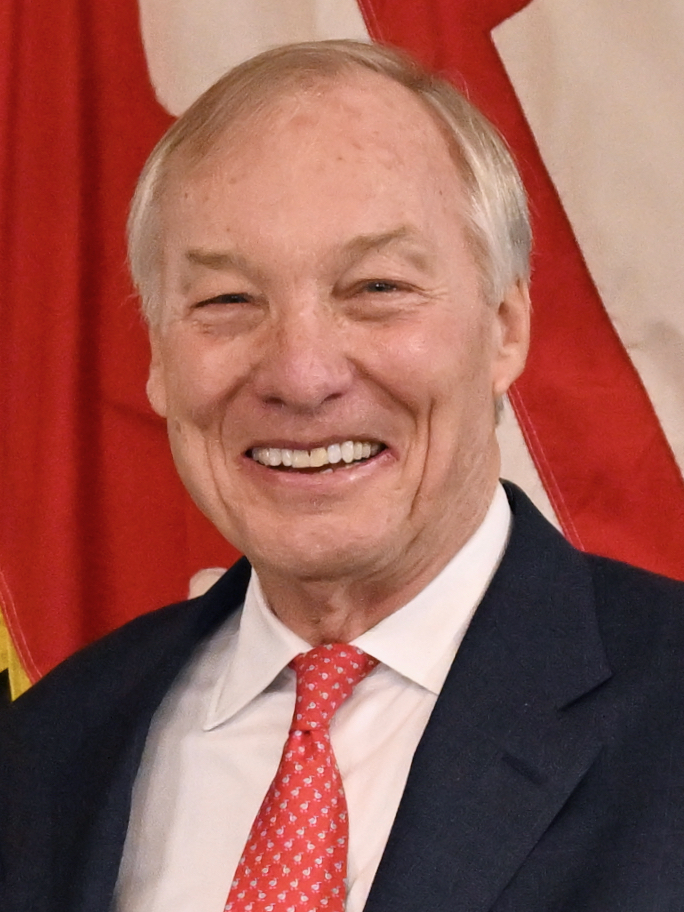

Nominee	Peter Franchot	Anjali Reed Phukan
Party	Democratic	Republican
Popular vote	1,620,264	624,871
Percentage	72.07%	27.79%
- Franchot: 50–60% 60–70% 70–80% 80–90% >90% Phukan: 40–50% 50–60% 60–70% 70–80% >90% Tie: 50% No data
Comptroller before election
Peter Franchot
Democratic
Elected Comptroller
Peter Franchot
Democratic

The Maryland Comptroller election of 2018 was held on November 6, 2018, to elect the Comptroller of Maryland. Incumbent Democratic Comptroller Peter Franchot filed for re-election to a third term on October 5, 2017, and was unopposed for the Democratic nomination. Anjali Reed Phukan became a candidate under the Republican Party on April 20, 2017, and was unopposed for the Republican nomination. Franchot won re-election with 72.1% of the vote.

This is the first time since 2010 that the Democratic candidate won a majority of counties for any statewide elected office.

== Democratic primary ==
=== Candidates ===
==== Declared ====
- Peter Franchot, incumbent comptroller

==== Declined ====
- Maggie McIntosh, state delegate
- Joseline Peña-Melnyk, state delegate and candidate for MD-04 in 2016
- James Rosapepe, state senator

=== Results ===
Democratic primary results
Party	Candidate	Votes	%
Democratic	Peter Franchot (incumbent)	510,159	100.0
Total votes		510,159	100.0

== Republican primary ==
=== Candidates ===
==== Declared ====
- Anjali Reed Phukan

=== Results ===
Republican primary results
Party	Candidate	Votes	%
Republican	Anjali Reed Phukan	165,242	100.0
Total votes		165,242	100.0

== General election ==
=== Results ===
Maryland Comptroller election, 2018
Party	Candidate	Votes	%	±%
Democratic	Peter Franchot (incumbent)	1,620,264	72.07%	+9.42%
Republican	Anjali Reed Phukan	624,871	27.79%	−9.39%
Write-in		3,103	0.14%	-0.01%
Total votes		2,248,238	100.0%	N/A
Democratic hold				

== See also ==
- 2018 United States elections
- 2018 Maryland gubernatorial election
