= 2014 Maryland Comptroller election =

2014 election

- November 4, 2014
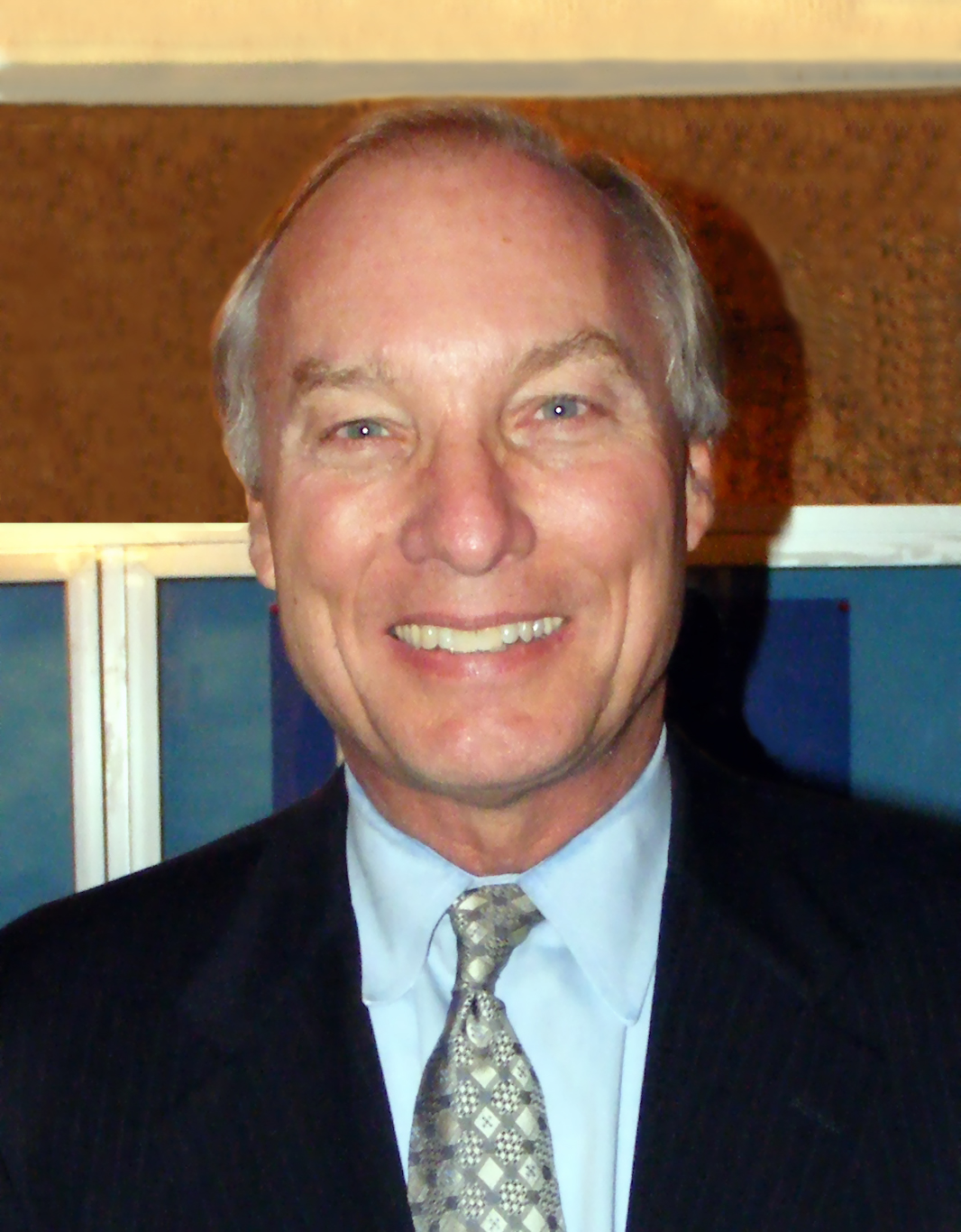

| Nominee | Peter Franchot | William H. Campbell |
| Party | Democratic | Republican |
| Popular vote | 1,061,267 | 630,109 |
| Percentage | 62.7% | 37.2% |
- Franchot: 50–60% 60–70% 70–80% 80–90% >90% Campbell: 50–60% 60–70% 70–80% Tie: 50% No data
Comptroller before election
Peter Franchot
Democratic
Elected Comptroller
Peter Franchot
Democratic

The Maryland Comptroller election of 2014 was held on November 4, 2014, to elect the Comptroller of Maryland. Incumbent Democratic Comptroller Peter Franchot ran for re-election to a third term in office.

Primary elections were held on June 24, 2014. Franchot was re-nominated by the Democrats and the Republicans nominated former Amtrak CFO William Henry Campbell.

== Democratic primary ==
Shortly after being re-elected in 2010, incumbent Comptroller Peter Franchot began considering running for Governor of Maryland in 2014. Six potential candidates for the position of Comptroller emerged during this time: State House of Delegates Majority Leader Kumar P. Barve, State Delegate Jon Cardin, State Delegate Galen R. Clagett, former Montgomery County Executive Doug Duncan, State Delegate Brian Feldman and State Senator James Rosapepe, with Barve and Rosapepe saying they would definitely run if Franchot did not. In December 2012, Franchot announced that he would not be running for governor. Barve and Rosapepe subsequently ended their campaigns and Cardin, Claggett and Duncan decided to run for other offices. In September 2013, Franchot officially declared that he was running for a third term. Feldman did not rule out challenging him but ultimately declined to do so.

=== Candidates ===
==== Filed ====
- Peter Franchot, incumbent Comptroller

==== Withdrew ====
- Kumar P. Barve, Majority Leader of the Maryland House of Delegates (ran for re-election)
- James Rosapepe, state senator (ran for re-election)

==== Declined ====
- Jon Cardin, State Delegate (ran for Attorney General of Maryland)
- Galen R. Clagett, State Delegate (ran for Mayor of Frederick)
- Doug Duncan, former Montgomery County Executive and candidate for governor in 2006 (ran for Montgomery County Executive)
- Brian Feldman, state senator (ran for re-election)

=== Results ===
Democratic primary results
| Party | Candidate | Votes | % |
|---|---|---|---|
| Democratic | Peter Franchot (inc.) | 369,546 | 100 |
| Total votes | | 369,546 | 100 |

== Republican primary ==
=== Candidates ===
==== Filed ====
- William Henry Campbell, former Amtrak CFO, nominee for Comptroller in 2010 and candidate for Maryland Republican Party Chairman in 2011

=== Results ===
Republican primary results
| Party | Candidate | Votes | % |
|---|---|---|---|
| Republican | William Henry Campbell | 169,971 | 100 |
| Total votes | | 169,971 | 100 |

== General election ==
=== Candidates ===
- Peter Franchot (Democratic), incumbent Comptroller
- William Henry Campbell (Republican), former Amtrak CFO, nominee for Comptroller in 2010 and candidate for Maryland Republican Party Chairman in 2011
- Anjali Reed Phukan (Maryland's Service Party), Party Chairman and write-in candidate

=== Polling ===
| Poll source | Date(s) administered | Sample size | Margin of error | Peter Franchot (D) | William Henry Campbell (R) | Other | Undecided |
|---|---|---|---|---|---|---|---|
| Gravis Marketing | October 6–9, 2014 | 784 | ± 3.5% | 54% | 30% | — | 16% |

=== Results ===
Maryland Comptroller election, 2014
| Party | Candidate | Votes | % |
|---|---|---|---|
| Democratic | Peter Franchot (inc.) | 1,061,267 | 62.65 |
| Republican | William Henry Campbell | 630,109 | 37.2 |
| Write-ins | | 2,536 | 0.1 |
| Majority | | 431,158 | 25.45% |
| Total votes | | 1,693,912 | 100 |
| Democratic hold | | | |

== See also ==
- 2014 United States elections
- 2014 Maryland gubernatorial election
- 2014 Maryland Attorney General election
