= James Rosapepe =

American politician (born 1951)

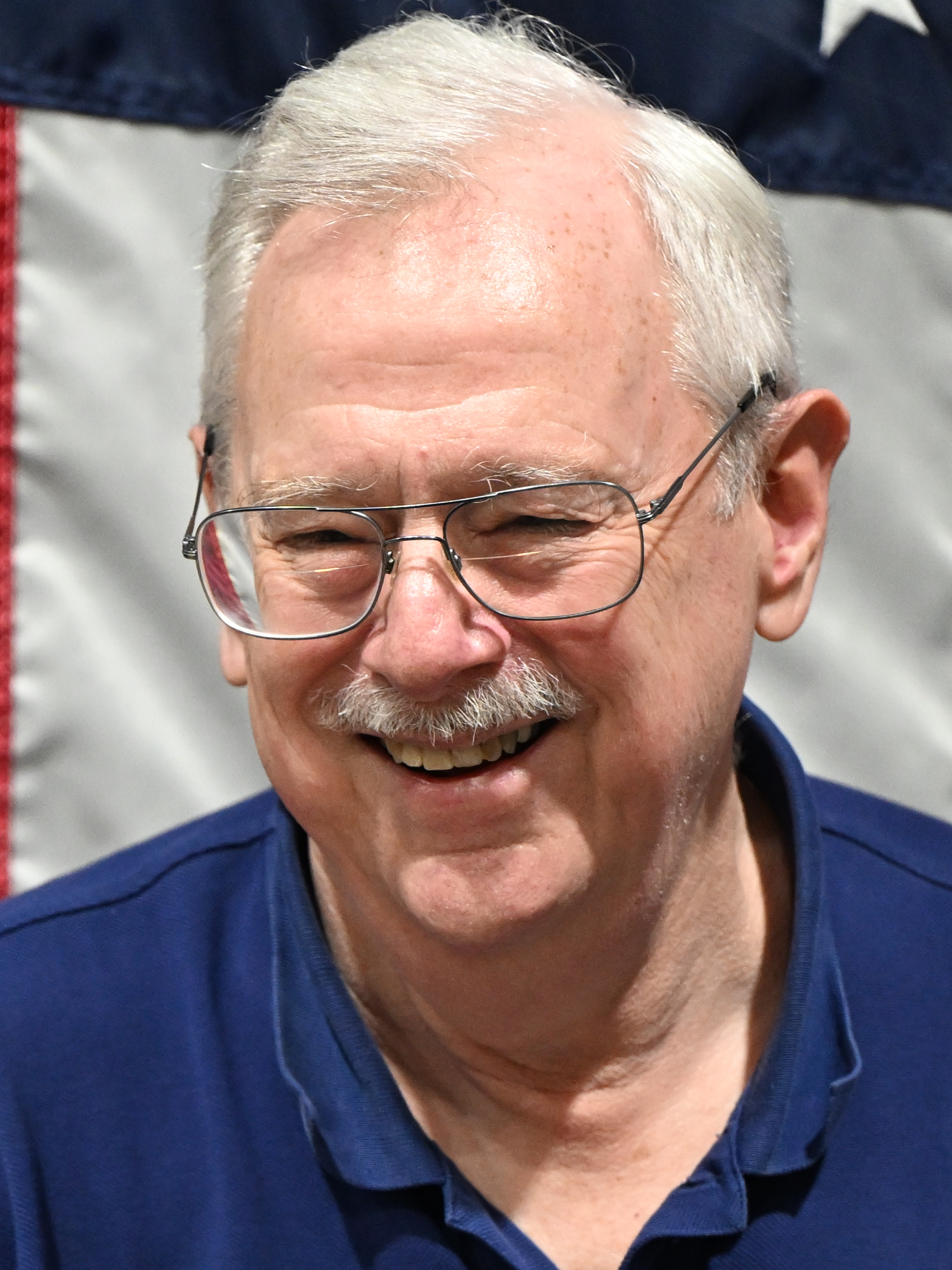
- Rosapepe in 2024

Member of the Maryland Senate from the 21st district
- Incumbent
- Assumed office January 10, 2007
- Preceded by: John A. Giannetti Jr.

United States Ambassador to Romania
- In office January 20, 1998 – March 1, 2001
- President: Bill Clinton; George W. Bush
- Preceded by: Alfred H. Moses
- Succeeded by: Michael E. Guest

Member of the Maryland House of Delegates from the 21st district
- In office January 3, 1987 – December 31, 1997
- Preceded by: Thomas J. Mooney
- Succeeded by: Brian R. Moe

Personal details
- Born: May 20, 1951 (age 75) Rome, Italy
- Party: Democratic
- Spouse: Sheilah A. Kast
- Education: Yale University; Georgetown University
- Occupation: Businessman

James Carew Rosapepe (born May 20, 1951) is an American politician and diplomat serving as a member of the Maryland Senate since 2007, representing District 21. A member of the Democratic Party, he previously served in the Maryland House of Delegates from 1987 to 1997, and was the United States Ambassador to Romania from 1998 to 2001.

== Early life and education ==
Rosapepe was born in Rome on May 20, 1951, where his parents were working as American journalists. His grandparents had migrated to the United States from Russia in the early 20th century. Rosapepe grew up in New York before moving to Arlington County, Virginia in the late 1960s, and attended Yale University as an undergraduate, but did not graduate, and later studied at Georgetown University.

== Career ==
Rosapepe has been involved in politics since he was 17 years old. While living in Arlington, he served as the president of the Arlington Youth Council. Rosapepe took a year off from attending Yale to work as an intern to the President's Council on Youth Opportunity within the Nixon administration. During his internship, he was the subject of multiple White House memos that questioned whether he should have a voice in the Youth Conference, citing his activism and anti-Nixon views. Despite these memos, White House aide Steve Hess, who hired Rosapepe, said that he would not consider discharging him as the council also included members of the right-wing Young Americans for Freedom organization, and that having "some radical liberals" in the Youth Conference gave it credibility. Afterwards, Rosapepe worked as a policy assistant to various congressmembers, for whom he worked on macroeconomic and competition issues. From 1979 to 1981, he served as a member of the National Petroleum Council. Rosapepe worked for the Maryland Committee on Federal Income Tax Conformity in 1982, and afterwards chaired the Economic Development Committee for the city of College Park, Maryland, until 1986. He also served as a member of the Maryland Democratic State Central Committee from 1985 to 1992, and later as the treasurer of the Maryland Democratic Party from 1985 to 1989 and as its deputy chair 1989 to 1992.

Rosapepe served as the president of the Maryland Main Street Development Association from 1984 to 1985. Afterwards, he served on the boards of directors for the Center for National Policy and National Small Business United until 1992. Since 2001, Rosapepe has served as the chief executive officer of Patuxent Capital Group. He has also worked as a federal lobbyist for the Multistate Tax Commission.

=== Maryland House of Delegates ===
Rosapepe was sworn into the Maryland House of Delegates on January 3, 1987. During his tenure, he was a member of the Spending Affordability Committee from 1987 to 1993, afterwards serving as its vice chair from 1995 until his resignation on December 31, 1997. The Baltimore Sun described Rosapepe as a suburban liberal—supporting organized labor, environmental advocacy, and increased education spending—and as an ally of Governor Parris Glendening. He also became involved with foreign policy issues during his tenure, attending an exchange trip to China in 1982 and extensively traveled to parts of the former Soviet Union. In 1995, Rosapepe was appointed to the Albanian-American Enterprise Fund.

Rosapepe worked as a national treasurer for U.S. Senator Paul Simon's 1988 presidential campaign. He worked on the 1992 and 1996 presidential campaigns of Bill Clinton, in which he helped organize Italian Americans behind Clinton and got to know Clinton, Al Gore, and many of their close advisors, including Sandy Berger and John Podesta.

=== Ambassador to Romania ===
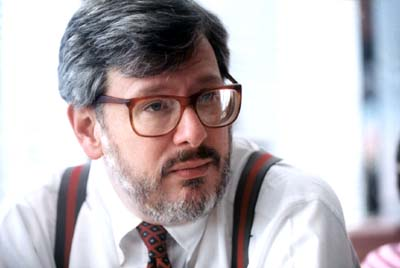
Rosapepe in 1999

On September 25, 1997, President Bill Clinton nominated Rosapepe to serve as the U.S. Ambassador to Romania. He was confirmed by the U.S. Senate on November 6, 1997, and was officially sworn in on January 20, 1998. In this capacity, Rosapepe helped integrate Romania into NATO and helped secure the country's support in the Kosovo War, and supported the country's transition to a democratic free market system by promoting U.S.-Romanian trade. He also criticized Cluj-Napoca mayor Gheorghe Funar for campaigning against a law granting rights to Romania's ethnic Hungarian minority. Rosapepe was the subject of an internal State Department report in which officials claimed that morale within the embassy plunged during his tenure and that the embassy often provided "inadequate" information on Romanian affairs, with communications often "tilted towards the Romanian perspective".

=== USM Board of Regents ===
Following his ambassadorship, Rosapepe was appointed by Governor Parris Glendening to serve on the University System Board of Regents from 2001 to 2006. In this capacity, he voted against tuition increases and criticized Governor Bob Ehrlich for vetoing the Higher Education Affordability and Access Act, a bill to cap tuition increases for three years and restore budget cuts to higher education. He also founded the Marylanders for Access to Quality Higher Education to lobby for the legislature to override the governor's veto on the bill.

=== Maryland Senate ===
In 2006, after Governor Bob Ehrlich did not reappoint Rosapepe to the University System Board of Regents, Rosapepe launched a primary challenge against state Senator John A. Giannetti Jr., who was perceived by other Democratic lawmakers as being too conservative after siding with Republicans and Governor Bob Ehrlich on key votes, including a bill to ban assault weapons in Maryland. During the Democratic primary, Giannetti gained national attention after performing the Heimlich maneuver on Rosapepe, who was choking on a piece of lobster at an Italian restaurant they were both eating at. Rosapepe defeated Giannetti in the Democratic primary with 58 percent of the vote, after which Giannetti switched his party affiliation to Republican to run against Rosapepe in the general election. Rosapepe again defeated Giannetti in the general election.

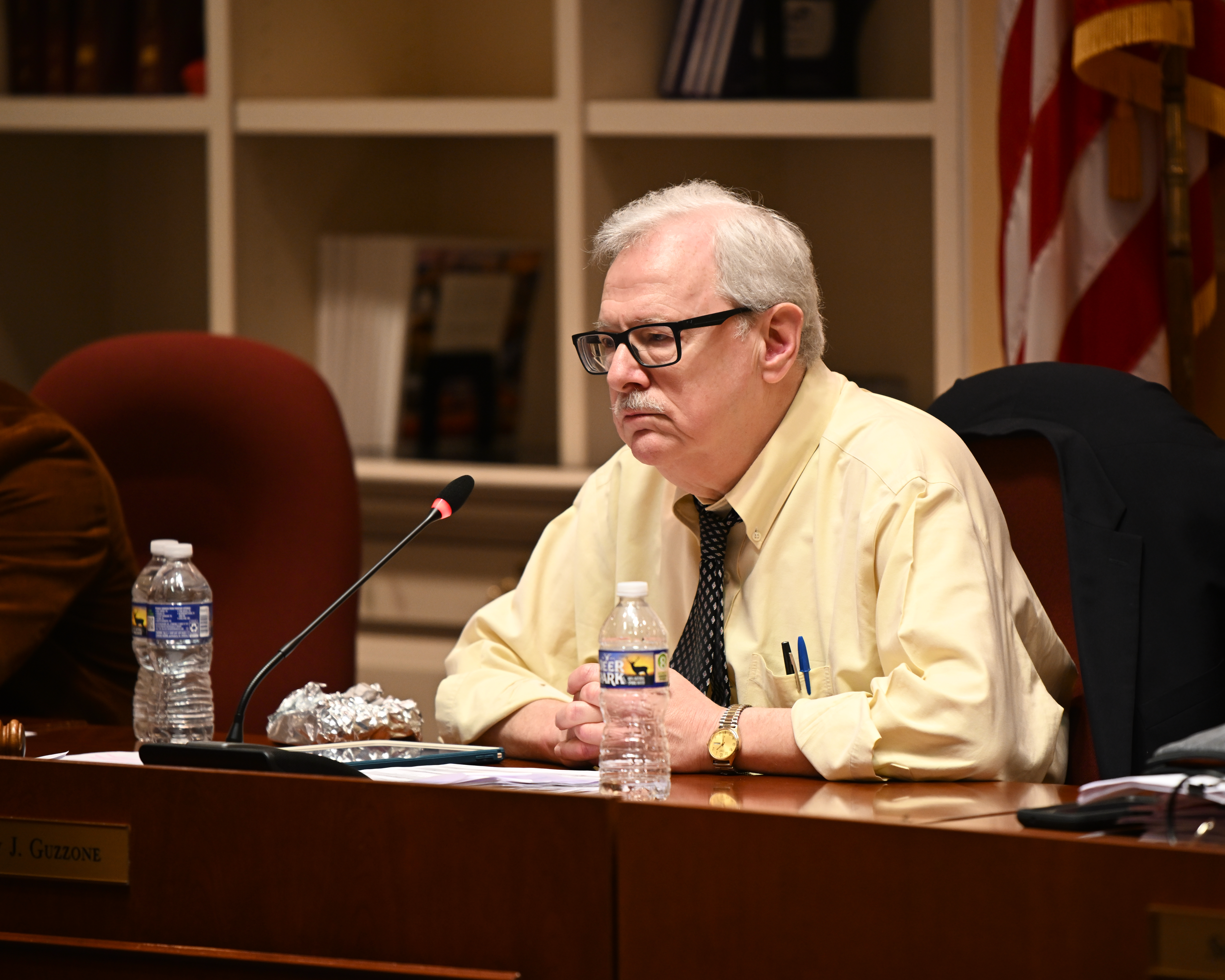
Rosapepe in the Budget and Taxation Committee, 2023

Rosapepe was sworn in on January 10, 2007. He was a member of the Education, Health and Environmental Affairs Committee from 2007 to 2016, afterwards serving on the Finance Committee. Rosapepe has served as a member of the Budget and Taxation Committee since 2019, and as the committee's vice chair from 2020 to 2027.

In January 2012, Rosapepe expressed interest in running for comptroller of Maryland in 2014 if Peter Franchot ran for governor instead of seeking re-election. Franchot declined to run for governor in 2014, and Rosapepe subsequently ran for reelection to the Maryland Senate.

In April 2019, Rosapepe and state Delegate Erek Barron launched "Biden for Maryland", becoming the first two Maryland lawmakers to endorse his bid for president. He also organized groups of ethnic leaders from Central and Eastern Europe, including Wesley Clark, to support and campaign for Biden in swing states.

== Political positions ==
=== Education ===
In April 1994, Rosapepe said he opposed a bill to provide state funding to build a new stadium for the Washington Redskins in Laurel, Maryland, saying that the stadium funds should instead go toward improving state schools. During the 1997 legislative session, he led an unsuccessful revolt against House leadership, in which he rallied for increased funding for education in underserved communities and Baltimore.

During the 2008 legislative session, Rosapepe introduced legislation that would allow disabled students to participate in school sports.

During the 2011 legislative session, Rosapepe voted for Maryland's Dream Act, a bill that extended in-state tuition for undocumented immigrants. In 2020, he supported a bill to lower the requirements for undocumented immigrants to apply for in-state tuition at public colleges.

In September 2013, Rosapepe expressed concerns with an Anne Arundel County Public Schools agreement that allowed school properties to be considered as possible cell site locations, which he said could affect the health of students.

In October 2018, Rosapepe defended University of Maryland, College Park president Wallace Loh following the death of football player Jordan McNair, saying that it was "insane" that people wanted to make Loh "a scapegoat" for McNair's death. He urged Loh to stay as president after he offered his retirement later that month, and celebrated Loh's decision to delay his retirement until June 2020.

=== Energy ===
Rosapepe opposes electricity deregulation. During the 2008 legislative session, he introduced a bill that would require utility companies that build power plants in Maryland to first sell their electricity in-state, which passed and became law. In July 2012, after a derecho left more than a million residents without power for several days, Rosapepe called for fines of $100 million against Pepco and Baltimore Gas and Electric as well as requiring utility companies to place power lines underground to prevent future outages. Rosapepe expressed disappointment with the Maryland Public Service Commission's decision not to place stiff fines against the utility companies in its assessment following the derecho.

=== Gun policy ===
During the 1987 legislative session, Rosapepe voted to overturn a Maryland Court of Appeals ruling that allowed victims of crimes committed with Saturday night special handguns to sue the weapon's manufacturers. During the 2013 legislative session, he voted for the Firearm Safety Act, which banned assault weapons and placed restrictions on firearm purchases. In 2016, Rosapepe introduced legislation to ban terrorists from acquiring firearms and supported bills banning firearms on campuses and requiring domestic abusers to surrender their guns.

=== Healthcare ===
During the 2019 legislative session, Rosapepe supported legislation to establish the Prescription Drug Affordability Board to negotiate the prices of prescription drugs and other bills to make it easier for uninsured people to apply for health coverage.

In April 2020, amid the COVID-19 pandemic, Rosapepe urged Governor Larry Hogan to form a regional pact with bordering states. He criticized the Maryland Department of Health's rollout of the COVID-19 vaccine, accusing the agency of creating "artificial shortages" and not providing adequate constituent services. Rosapepe also supported a COVID-19 vaccine mandate in schools.

=== Minimum wage ===
During the 2019 legislative session, Rosapepe voted for legislation to raise the minimum wage to $15 an hour.

=== Social issues ===
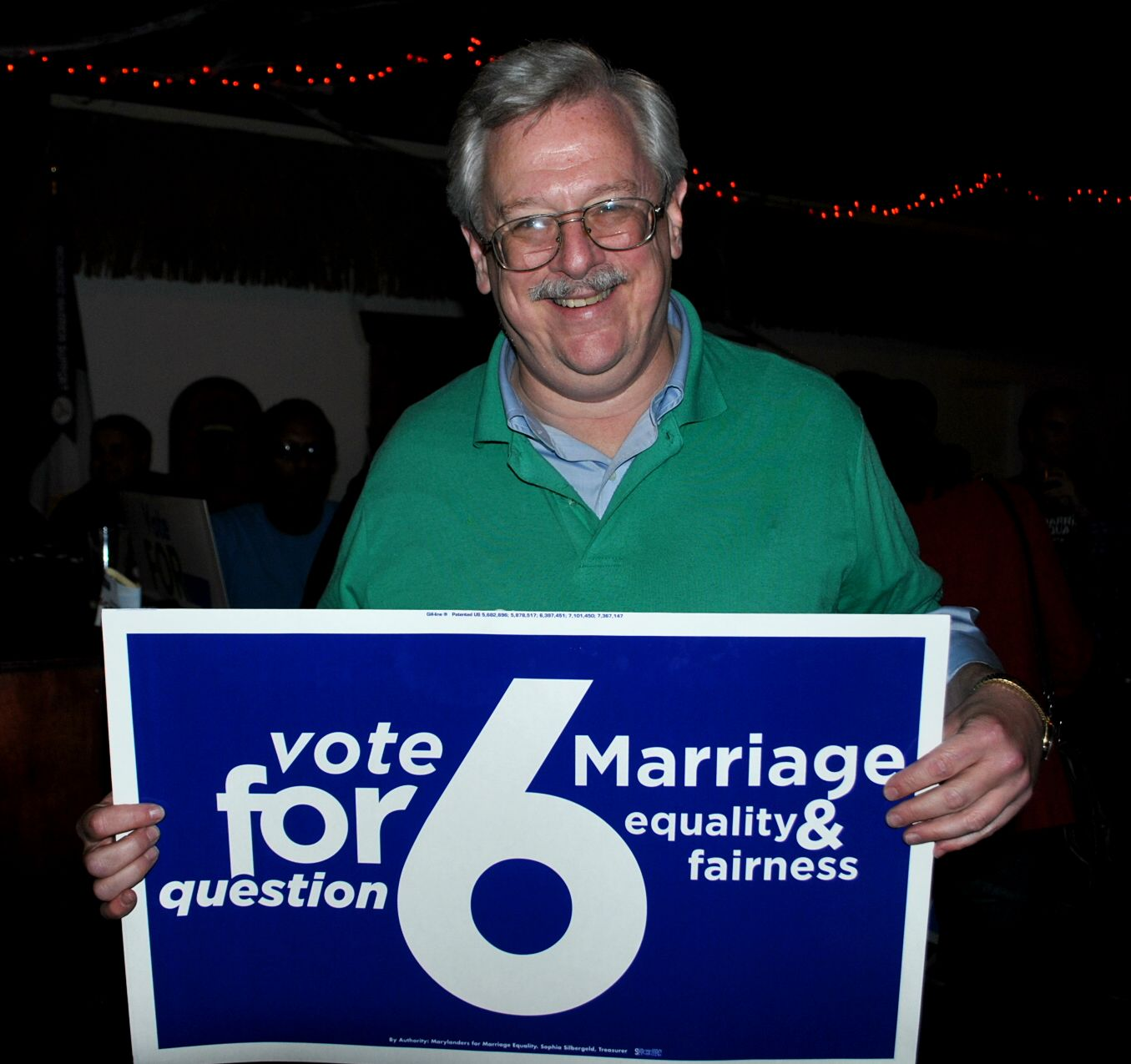
Rosapepe holding a sign supporting Question 6, 2012

During his tenure as the president of the Arlington Youth Council, Rosapepe opposed anti-loitering laws that were aimed at teenagers and campaigned for more county funding for educational research.

In March 1995, Rosapepe voted to keep restrictions on how state tax dollars could be used to pay for abortions through Medicaid.

During the 2009 legislative session, Rosapepe voted for legislation to abolish the death penalty.

In February 2011, after the Religious Freedom and Civil Marriage Protection Act, a bill to legalize same-sex marriage in Maryland, was amended to include more protections for religious groups, Rosapepe said that he would support the bill. He was seen as a key vote on the bill, and his support gave it the support it needed to pass the Maryland Senate. In 2012, Rosapepe voted for the Civil Marriage Protection Act.

During the 2015 legislative session, Rosapepe supported a bill to restore voting rights for felons on parole. In 2016, he voted to override Governor Larry Hogan's veto of the bill.

In 2020, Rosapepe introduced legislation to make daylight saving time permanent.

=== Taxes ===
During the 1988 legislative session, Rosapepe introduced legislation that would require pizza shops to charge the sales tax on deliveries. In 1992, he voted for a bill to raise $1.2 billion in income and sales taxes.

In 1997, Rosapepe voted for a bill to provide tax credits to businesses who hire disabled people. He also opposed a proposal by Governor Parris Glendening to cut personal income taxes by 10 percent, preferring tax cuts aimed at middle- and lower-income families.

During debate on a bill that would provide $5.6 billion in tax incentives to Amazon to build their second headquarters in Montgomery County in 2018, Rosapepe introduced an amendment that would terminate the tax incentivizes if unclaimed by 2022. The amendment was adopted by the Maryland Senate.

=== Transportation ===
Rosapepe supports the Red Line and Purple Line. In June 2015, he attended a rally at the Laurel MARC station to protest against its possible closure by the Maryland Department of Transportation.

During the 1991 legislative session, Rosapepe introduced a resolution urging Congress to fund the design and development of a maglev train route connecting Washington, D.C. to Baltimore. In December 2017, he said that he opposed the proposed D.C.-Baltimore maglev train route.

In 1997, Rosapepe supported a bill to ban high-occupancy vehicle lanes on state highways, saying that the lanes made driving more difficult and less safe.

== Personal life ==
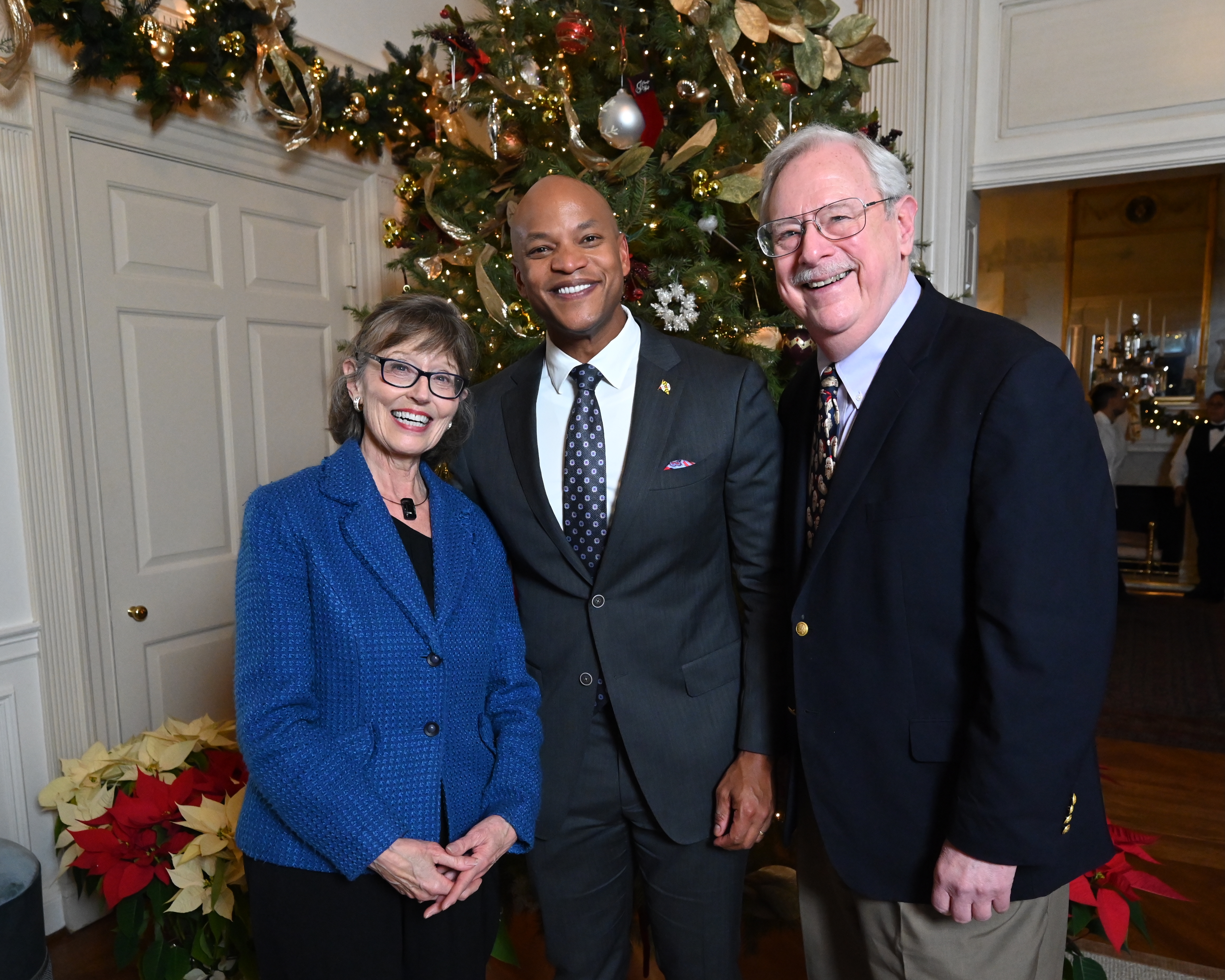
Rosapepe and his wife Sheilah with Governor Wes Moore, 2024

Rosapepe is married to Sheilah A. Kast, a former White House and economics correspondent for ABC News. He is Catholic. In November 2009, Rosapepe and his wife published Dracula is Dead, a travel literature book that explores the political and social history of Romania during the 20th century.

In late December 2007, Rosapepe was struck by a car in a hit-and-run incident during a business trip in Brussels. He returned to Maryland in early January 2008 with two bone fractures in his right leg.

== Electoral history ==
Maryland House of Delegates District 21 Democratic primary election, 1986
Party	Candidate	Votes	%
Democratic	Pauline Menes (incumbent)	5,799	25.7
Democratic	Timothy F. Maloney (incumbent)	5,550	24.6
Democratic	James Rosapepe	5,153	22.8
Democratic	John D'Eustachio	3,394	15.0
Democratic	Claire R. Bigelow	2,701	12.0

Maryland House of Delegates District 21 election, 1990
Party	Candidate	Votes	%
Democratic	Timothy F. Maloney (incumbent)	11,365	25.6
Democratic	Pauline Menes (incumbent)	11,081	24.9
Democratic	James Rosapepe (incumbent)	10,748	24.2
Republican	Debra DiCamillo	3,872	8.7
Republican	Charles D. Randall	3,799	8.6
Republican	Margaret Jahn	3,557	8.0

Maryland House of Delegates District 21 election, 1994
Party	Candidate	Votes	%
Democratic	Pauline Menes (incumbent)	13,207	29.0
Democratic	James Rosapepe (incumbent)	12,725	27.9
Democratic	Barbara A. Frush	12,109	26.6
Republican	Herbert F. Frymark	7,554	16.6

Maryland Senate District 21 Democratic primary election, 2006
Party	Candidate	Votes	%
Democratic	Jim Rosapepe	5,837	58.5
Democratic	John A. Giannetti Jr. (incumbent)	3,881	38.9
Democratic	Jessie Pulivarti	266	2.7

Maryland Senate District 21 election, 2006
Party	Candidate	Votes	%
Democratic	Jim Rosapepe	18,067	67.5
Republican	John A. Giannetti Jr. (incumbent)	8,663	32.4
Write-in		30	0.1

Maryland Senate District 21 election, 2010
Party	Candidate	Votes	%
Democratic	Jim Rosapepe (incumbent)	23,331	98.7
Write-in		302	1.3

Maryland Senate District 21 election, 2014
Party	Candidate	Votes	%
Democratic	Jim Rosapepe (incumbent)	22,241	97.6
Write-in		554	2.4

Maryland Senate District 21 election, 2018
Party	Candidate	Votes	%
Democratic	Jim Rosapepe (incumbent)	32,262	77.5
Republican	Lee Havis	9,311	22.4
Write-in		59	0.1

Maryland Senate District 21 election, 2022
Party	Candidate	Votes	%
Democratic	Jim Rosapepe (incumbent)	23,666	79.0
Republican	Lee Havis	6,242	20.8
Write-in		46	0.2

== Bibliography ==
- Dracula is dead: how Romanians survived communism, ended it, and emerged since 1989 as the new Italy, Bancroft Press, 2009. ISBN 1890862657
