= 2010 Maryland Comptroller election =

- November 2, 2010
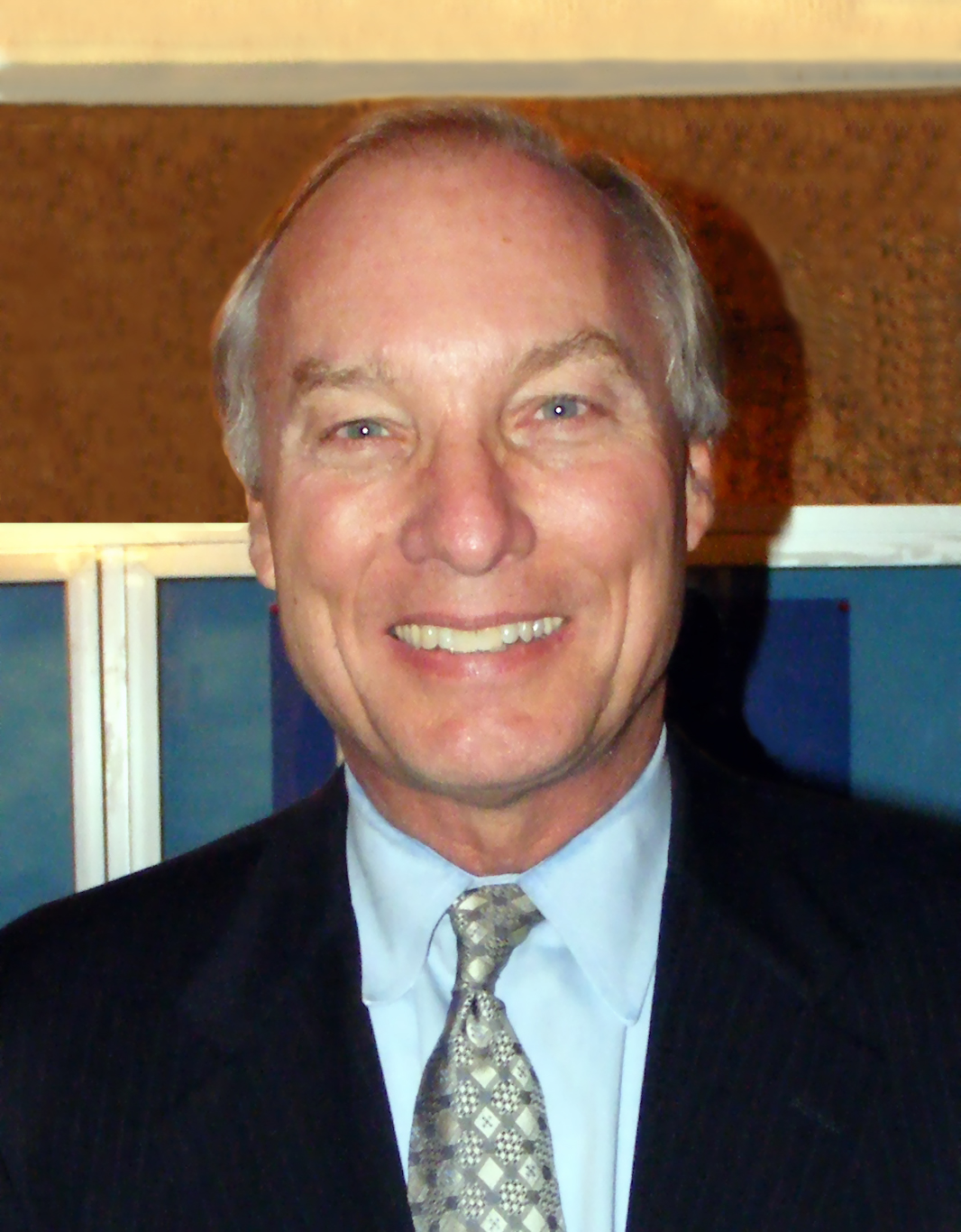

Nominee	Peter Franchot	William H. Campbell
Party	Democratic	Republican
Popular vote	1,087,836	691,461
Percentage	61.1%	38.8%
- Franchot: 50–60% 60–70% 70–80% 80–90% >90% Campbell: 40–50% 50–60% 60–70% 70–80% 80–90% Tie: 40–50%
Comptroller before election
Peter Franchot
Democratic
Elected Comptroller
Peter Franchot
Democratic

The Maryland Comptroller election of 2010 was held on November 2, 2010. Incumbent Democratic Comptroller Peter Franchot ran for a second term and faced off against former Amtrak CFO William H. Campbell in the general election, whom he defeated in a landslide.

== Democratic primary ==
=== Candidates ===
- Peter Franchot, incumbent Comptroller of Maryland

==== Declined ====
- Brian Feldman, state senator

=== Results ===
Democratic primary results
Party	Candidate	Votes	%
Democratic	Peter Franchot (inc.)	393,587	100.00
Total votes		393,587	100.00

== Republican primary ==
=== Candidates ===
- William H. Campbell, former Amtrak Chief Financial Officer
- Brendan Madigan, political consultant
- Armand F. Girard, math teacher

=== Results ===
Republican Primary results
Party	Candidate	Votes	%
Republican	William H. Campbell	135,318	63.49
Republican	Brendan Madigan	54,095	25.38
Republican	Armand F. Girard	23,721	11.13
Total votes		213,134	100.00

== General election ==
=== Results ===
Maryland Comptroller election, 2010
Party	Candidate	Votes	%	±%
Democratic	Peter Franchot (inc.)	1,087,836	61.08%	+2.11%
Republican	William H. Campbell	691,461	38.82%	−2.01%
Write-ins		1,779	0.10%	
Majority		396,375	22.25%	+4.11%
Turnout		1,781,096		
Democratic hold		Swing		
