= Peter Franchot =

American politician (born 1947)

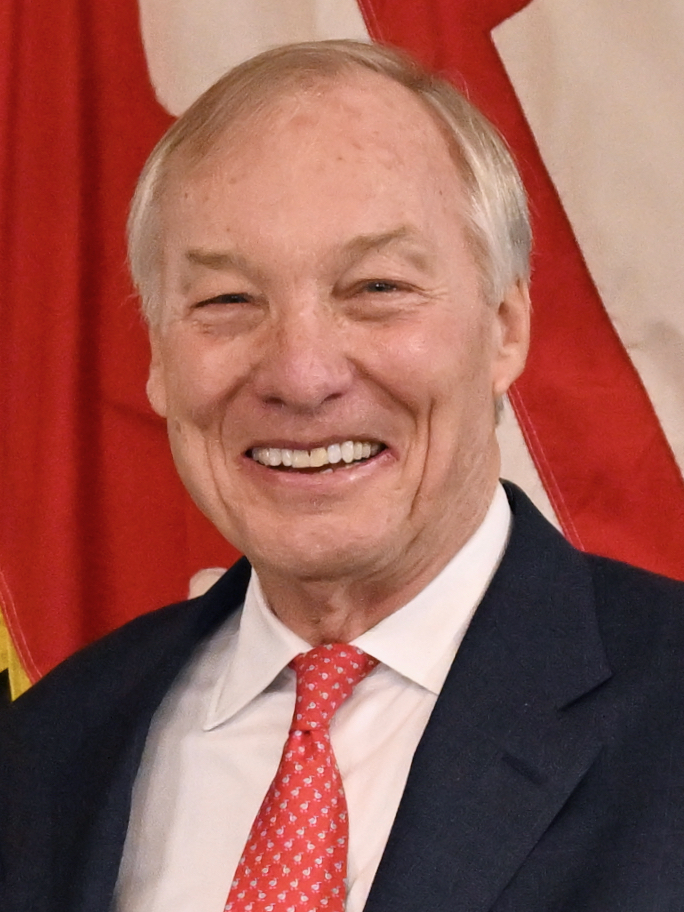
- Franchot in 2023

33rd Comptroller of Maryland
- In office January 22, 2007 – January 16, 2023
- Governor: Martin O'Malley; Larry Hogan
- Preceded by: William Donald Schaefer
- Succeeded by: Brooke Lierman

Member of the Maryland House of Delegates from the 20th district
- In office January 14, 1987 – January 10, 2007
- Preceded by: Ida G. Ruben
- Succeeded by: Tom Hucker; Heather Mizeur

Personal details
- Born: Peter Van Rensselaer Franchot; November 25, 1947 (age 78) New Haven, Connecticut, U.S.
- Party: Democratic
- Spouse: Anne Maher (m. 1981)
- Children: 2
- Education: Amherst College (BA); Northeastern University (JD)
- Website: Official website

Military service
- Allegiance: United States
- Branch/service: United States Army
- Years of service: 1968–1970

Peter Van Rensselaer Franchot (born November 25, 1947) is an American politician who served as the 33rd comptroller of Maryland from 2007 to 2023. A member of the Democratic Party, Franchot served for 20 years in the Maryland House of Delegates, representing Takoma Park and Silver Spring.

Franchot was elected comptroller in 2006, defeating incumbent William Donald Schaefer in the Democratic primary, and was subsequently re-elected three times. During his tenure, Franchot supported efforts to expand Interstate 270 and the Capital Beltway, deregulate the state's craft beer economy, and pressure Baltimore County officials to replace aging air conditioning equipment in public schools. He opposed initiatives to legalize and later expand gambling in Maryland. After Republican Larry Hogan defeated Democrat Anthony Brown in the 2014 Maryland gubernatorial election, Franchot pledged a bipartisan alliance with Hogan, with whom he worked to support various causes on the Maryland Board of Public Works.

Franchot unsuccessfully ran for governor of Maryland in 2022, placing third in the Democratic primary behind Tom Perez and Wes Moore.

== Early life and education ==
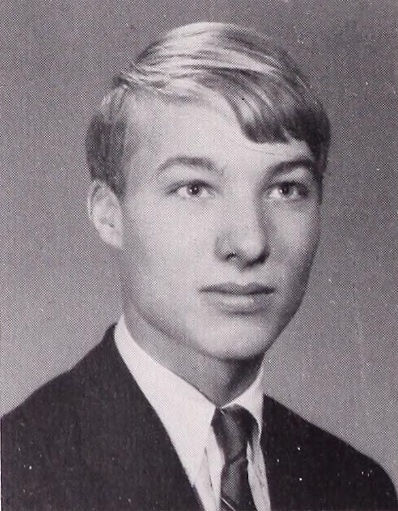
Franchot's high school yearbook photo, 1966

Franchot was born in New Haven, Connecticut, and attended Phillips Academy in Andover, Massachusetts. He attended Amherst College, but later left to join the presidential campaign of Senator Eugene McCarthy. After serving in the United States Army from 1968 to 1970, Franchot again attended Amherst, earning a Bachelor of Arts degree in English in 1973. He graduated from Northeastern University School of Law with a Juris Doctor in 1978.

== Career ==
After graduating from law school, Franchot worked as legislative counsel for the Union of Concerned Scientists. He then served as staff director for then-Congressman Ed Markey from 1980 to 1986. After his election to the Maryland House of Delegates in 1986, Franchot was a self-employed business development consultant.

=== Maryland House of Delegates ===
From 1987 to 2007, Franchot served in the Maryland House of Delegates, representing the 20th legislative district, which includes Takoma Park and Silver Spring. Franchot was a member of the Appropriations Committee and chaired the Public Safety and Administration Subcommittee, as well as the Transportation and Environment Subcommittee.

In 1988, while serving his first term in the House of Delegates, Franchot ran for Maryland's 8th congressional district against Republican incumbent Connie Morella. Morella defeated Franchot, 63% to 37%, in the general election.

During the years leading up to his 2006 bid for comptroller, Franchot opposed Republican governor Bob Ehrlich's efforts to expand slot machine gambling in Maryland. He considered a run for governor to challenge Ehrlich, but ultimately ran for Comptroller of Maryland.

=== Comptroller of Maryland ===
Franchot ran in the Democratic primary for Comptroller of Maryland against incumbent William Donald Schaefer and Anne Arundel County Executive Janet S. Owens. Franchot defeated Schaefer in the Democratic primary election, marking Schaefer's first loss in his 51-year career. Franchot defeated the Republican nominee, Anne McCarthy, in the general election on November 7, 2006. Franchot was sworn into office on January 22, 2007.

Franchot considered running for the 2014 Democratic nomination for governor. In December 2012, he announced he would instead seek re-election as comptroller.

==== Tenure ====
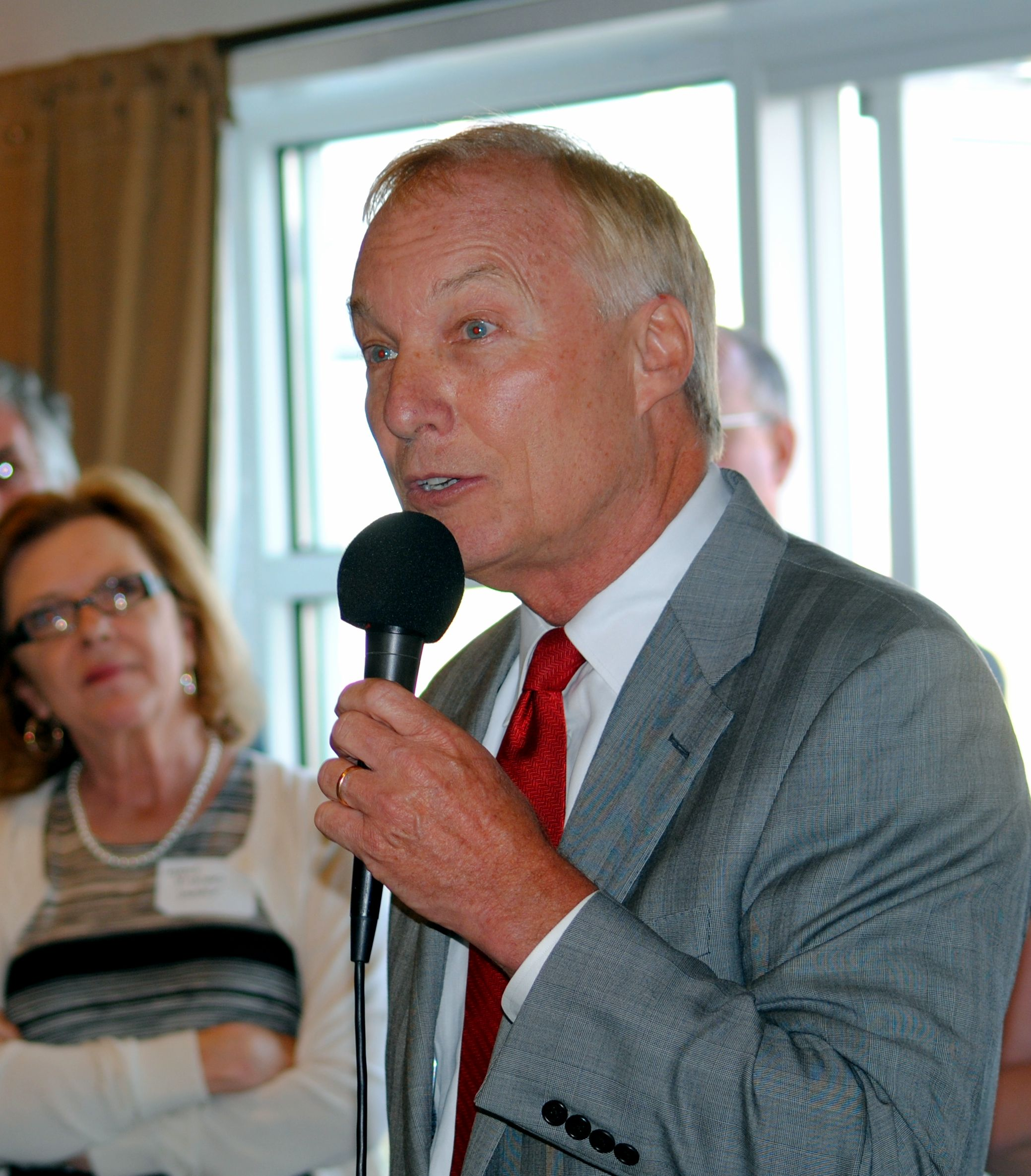
Franchot in 2014

Franchot took office on January 22, 2007, and was re-elected in 2010, 2014, and 2018. As comptroller, Franchot supported adding toll lanes on the beltway and I-270, requiring schools to open after Labor Day, and reducing restrictions on craft beer sales in Maryland.

In an interview with WYPR in July 2018, Franchot announced he would not endorse his party's nominee for governor, Ben Jealous, and would instead remain neutral in the gubernatorial contest. "I think I'm probably going to remain neutral in that race—simply because it's important for me to get along with whoever is elected," Franchot said. This is despite previous pledges made ahead of the primary to support the party's nominee in the gubernatorial election.

==== Board of Public Works ====
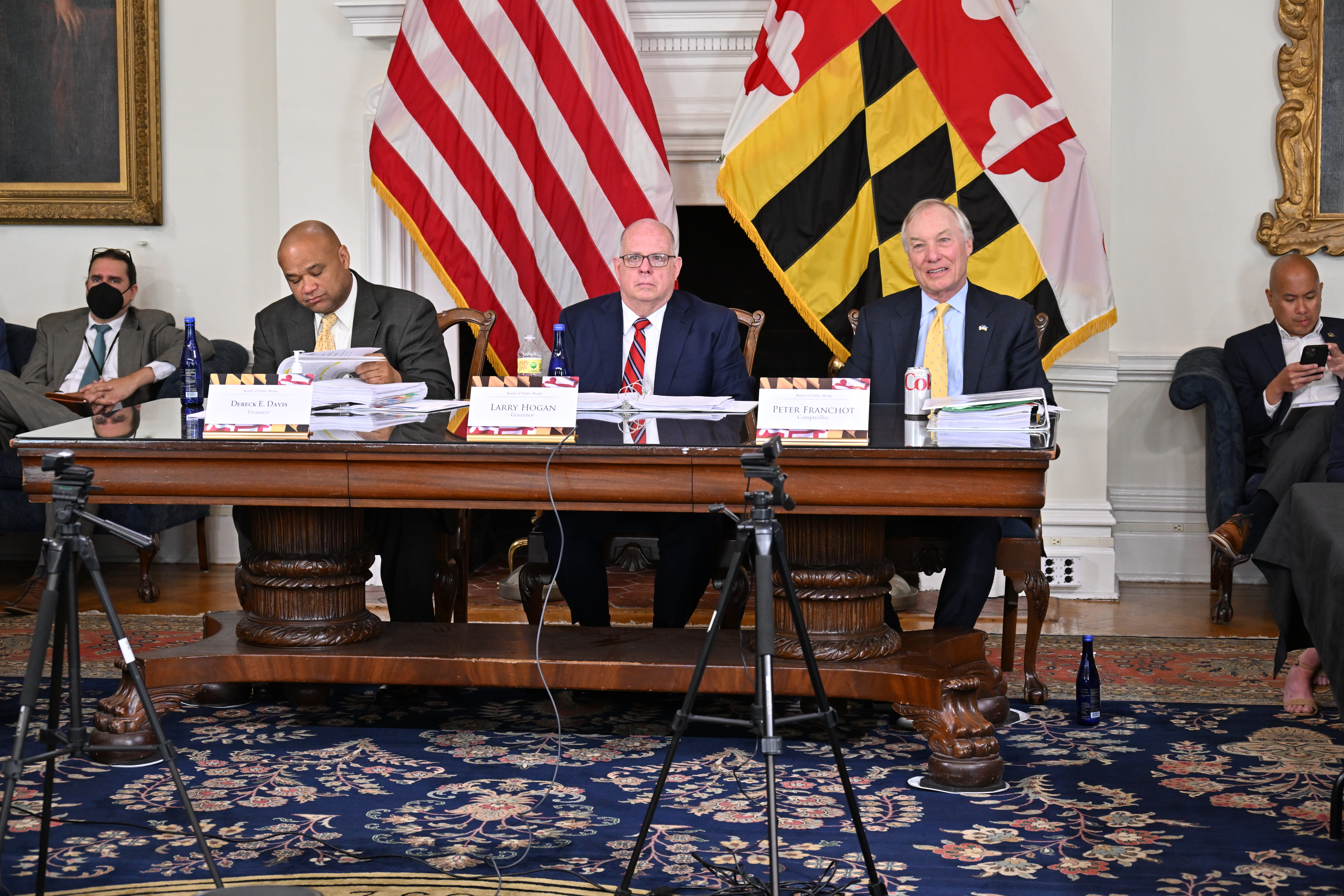
Franchot (right) on the Board of Public Works with State Treasurer Dereck E. Davis (left) and Governor Larry Hogan (center), 2022

Franchot, along with the governor and the state treasurer, compose the Board of Public Works — a constitutionally appointed body that oversees many aspects of the state's finances. During his tenure on the Board, Franchot worked to advance initiatives that reformed the state's procurement process and practices, including the reduction of single-bid contracts and increased participation among minority and women-owned enterprises.

==== Air-conditioning in Baltimore-area schools ====
Franchot used his seat on the Board of Public Works and his high-profile political position to publicly pressure officials in Baltimore City and Baltimore County to immediately install air conditioning units in aging school facilities that lack HVAC systems. He frequently sparred with school system leaders and elected officials from Baltimore County, a jurisdiction that in 2011 had 65 school buildings without air-conditioning. His public spats with County Executive Kevin Kamenetz, a fellow Democrat, over this issue have alienated Franchot from members of his own party.

In January 2016, the Board of Public Works approved the use of state funding for portable air conditioners in Baltimore-area schools and lifted a ban on using state funding to purchase window air-conditioning units for public school classrooms. During the meeting, Franchot faced criticism for comparing the lack of air conditioning in schools to the Flint water crisis, saying "We were all dismissed as a bunch of malcontents. This is our Flint".

Towards the end of the 2016 legislative session, top legislative leaders, who objected to Franchot's frequent criticism, inserted language in budget bills to prevent the use of state funds for portable air-conditioning units in schools, which aligned with Kamenetz's views. In the same legislative session, lawmakers sought to end a practice — known as "beg-a-thon" — where school system leaders appear before the Board of Public Works to request additional school construction funding. Later that year in May, the Board of Public Works voted 2–1 to withhold state funding for school construction in Baltimore and Baltimore County unless local officials installed air conditioning in all classrooms by the start of the next school year. In response, Kamenetz released a plan that accelerated the county's installation timeline by one year. In January 2017, the Board of Public Works voted to restore funding to the jurisdictions.

In September 2016, Franchot and the president of the Maryland State NAACP chapter, Gerald Stansbury, wrote a letter to the U.S. Department of Justice to investigate the lack of air-conditioning in public schools in Baltimore City and Baltimore County. They wrote that the sweltering conditions in these schools, predominantly in financially depressed communities, amounted to a "blatant neglect of students' civil rights".

During the 2017 legislative session, the Maryland General Assembly adopted a budget that removed Governor Hogan from the process of approving the state's school construction plans and allocated $5 million in funding for air-conditioning projects in city schools. During the 2018 legislative session, top Democratic leaders voted to strip the Board of Public Works of its oversight and management of the state's public school construction program. Despite a veto from Hogan, the legislature overrode the governor along party lines. Delegate Maggie McIntosh, chairwoman of the House Appropriations Committee and floor leader for the legislation, directly cited Franchot's outspokenness about the air-conditioning issue as a reason contributing to this decision. The legislation established a task force whose membership is appointed by the governor and the legislative presiding officers to oversee and disburse taxpayer dollars for school construction investments.

==== Opposition to slots and expanded gambling in Maryland ====
Franchot campaigned against bringing slot machine gambling to Maryland. As a member of the House of Delegates, he led a successful coalition of lawmakers to oppose the Constitutional amendment to legalize slots. In 2008, Franchot, along with hundreds of others, launched Marylanders United to Stop Slots to encourage a 'no' vote on the referendum. Franchot argued that the high social costs of increased crime, broken families and bankruptcies would outweigh any revenue gains. Franchot's opposition to the slots referendum put him at odds with fellow members of his own party, including Governor Martin O'Malley and Senate President Thomas V. Mike Miller, both of whom were prominent proponents of the slots referendum. The 2008 slots referendum passed by a margin of 59 percent to 41 percent.

In June 2012, Franchot criticized the General Assembly for holding a special session for a proposal for a new casino at National Harbor, which would be the sixth casino in Prince George's County. In a letter to members of the legislature, he encouraged lawmakers to disclose "all contributions from national gambling interests" and warned against approving the casino, saying it would "cannibalize" the venues and "jeopardize the viability of state's casino program". In an interview with the Washington Examiner on gambling expansion in Maryland, Franchot expressed heavy skepticism about the promise of casino revenue being used for educational purposes. "Any education funding that goes into the Education Trust Fund is subject to being raided by the legislature," Franchot said. "That is what's happened historically; that inevitably is what will happen again." He opposed a referendum to legalize table games at the state's casinos. The 2012 referendum passed by a narrow margin, 52 percent to 48 percent.

Franchot opposed a 2020 referendum to legalize sports betting in Maryland. The 2020 referendum passed by a wide margin, 67 percent to 33 percent.

==== Craft beer regulation ====
Franchot opposed a bill that was unanimously passed by the General Assembly during the 2017 legislative session, which imposed restrictions on the sale and distribution of craft beer products in the state. In response, Franchot formed a "Reform on Tap" task force to study Maryland's beer laws and propose reforms on what he considered "antiquated, dysfunctional, anti-small business, and anti-consumer". In November 2017, he proposed a legislative package to reform the state's regulations on craft brewers through deregulation. The bill would have removed regulations on take-home and taproom sales and limits on beer production, and would have removed a "buy-back" provision that prevented breweries from buying their products from wholesalers to increase the limits on what they're allowed to sell.

In response to Franchot, Delegates Ben Kramer and Warren Miller introduced legislation forming a task force to study which agency is best suited to regulate the alcohol industry in Maryland. After a hearing in the House Economic Matters Committee that lasted several hours and featured dozens of brewers, elected officials, and other stakeholders who testified to support Franchot's bill, the committee voted 17–4 to reject the comptroller's legislation. During the 2019 legislative session, Kramer introduced legislation to strip the comptroller's office of its ability to regulate the alcohol, tobacco, and motor fuels industries, instead moving these responsibilities to a governor-appointed commission. The bill passed and was vetoed by Governor Hogan, but the General Assembly voted to override the veto.

==== Interstate 270 and Capital Beltway expansion ====
On May 8, 2019, the Prince George's County Council voted unanimously for a proposal requiring Governor Larry Hogan to undertake further environmental reviews before proceeding with his plan to expand Interstate 270 and the Capital Beltway. On June 5, the State Board of Public Works voted to approve the proposal. Franchot and Hogan voted in favor of the proposal, while Nancy Kopp opposed it.

In August 2021, the Maryland Board of Public Works voted to accept a contract that would allow an international consortium to begin design work on the plan to add privately financed toll lanes to portions of the Beltway and I-270, with Franchot and Hogan voting to approve the plans and Kopp voting against it. A second contract, which set up a one-dollar-a-year lease arrangement over 60 years between the Maryland Department of Transportation and the Maryland Transportation Authority, was also agreed upon. On November 19, 2021, the Maryland Transportation Authority Board voted unanimously to approve toll rates on Interstate 270, with prices depending on whether drivers use EZ-Pass or video tolling, the driver's vehicle and amount of passengers, and if drivers commute during hours where traffic is especially acute.

=== 2022 Maryland gubernatorial campaign ===
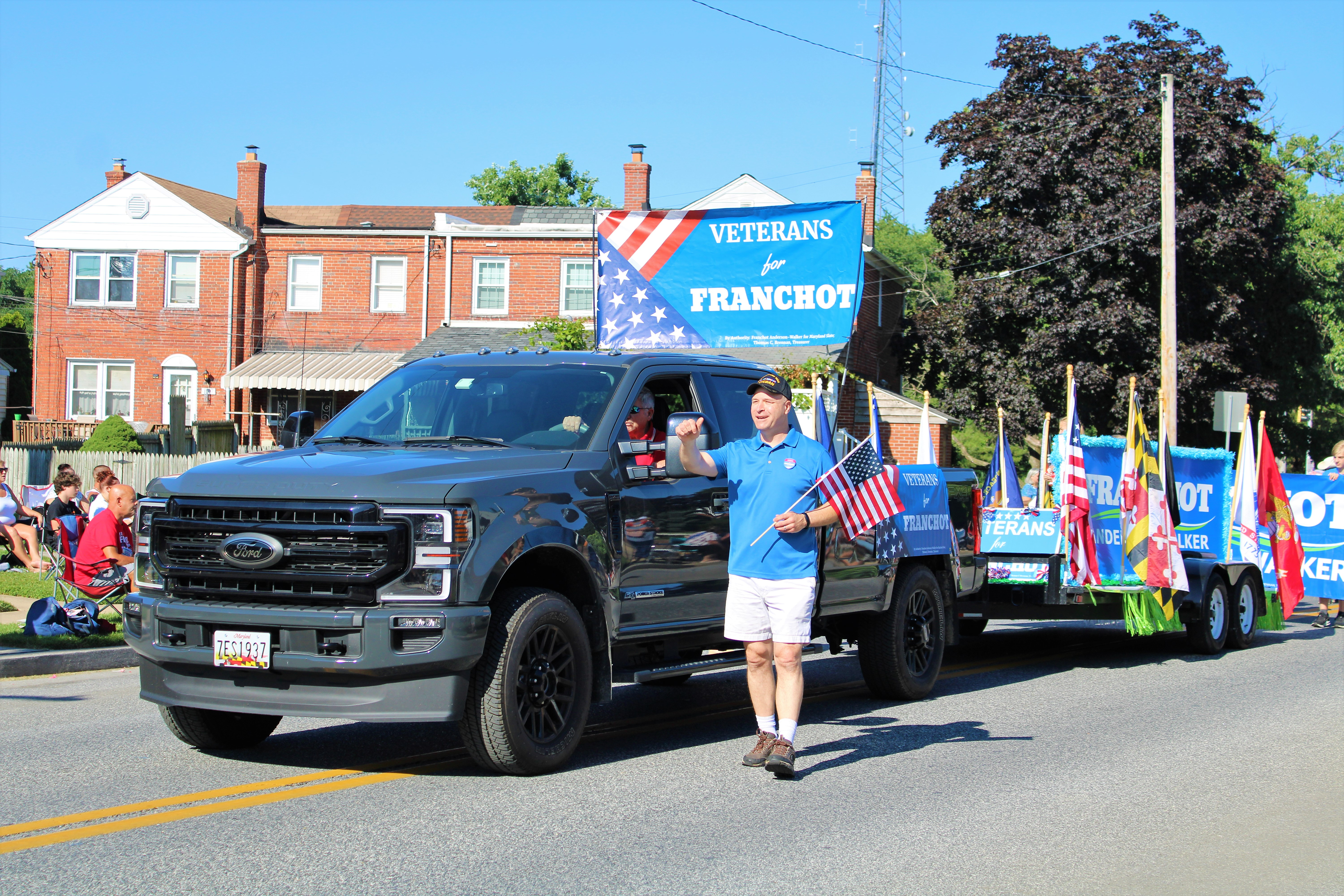
Franchot supporters campaigning in Dundalk, Maryland, 2022

On January 22, 2020, Franchot announced his candidacy for governor of Maryland in the 2022 election, which would be vacated by Larry Hogan (R), who is term-limited, in 2022. His running mate was Monique Anderson-Walker, a member of the Prince George's County council. During the primaries, he was noted for his absence at many of the candidate forums held around the state.

Franchot received endorsements from over 100 current and former officeholders, including former representative Wayne Gilchrist and former lieutenant governor Melvin Steinberg.

On July 1, 2022, Franchot's campaign announced its workers unionized with Campaign Workers Guild.

On July 19, 2022, Franchot lost the primary, placing third behind Tom Perez and Wes Moore. This was Franchot's first campaign loss since his run for Congress in 1988. He conceded on July 22, 2022, and endorsed Democratic nominee Wes Moore.

== Personal life ==
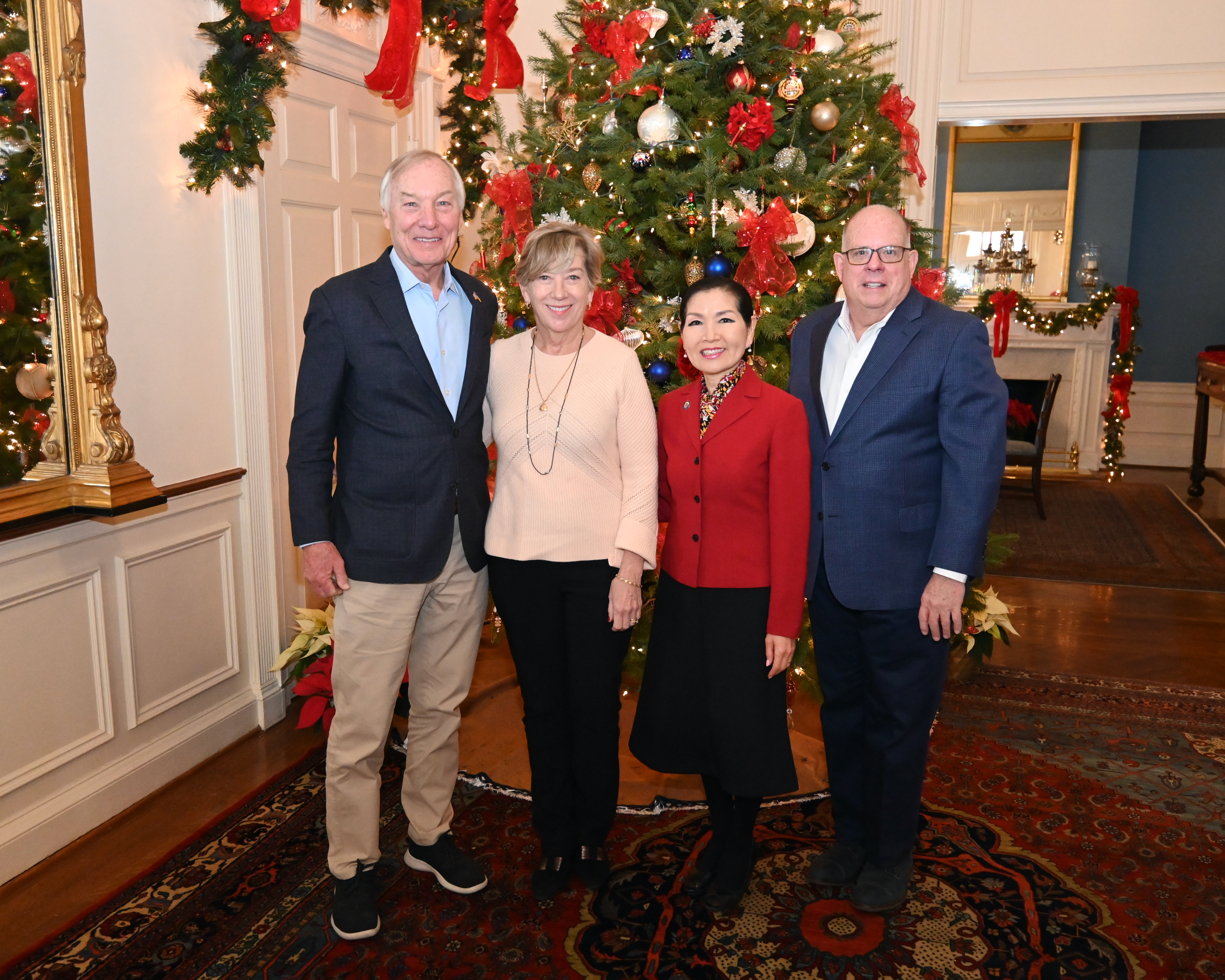
Franchot and his wife Anne Maher with Governor Larry Hogan and First Lady Yumi Hogan.

Franchot married his wife, Anne Maher, in 1981. Together, they own two homes: one in Takoma Park, Maryland; and a second $800,000 home in Cape Cod, Massachusetts. Together, they have two children, Abbe (born 1982) and Nick (born 1985).

== Political positions ==
In his run for House of Representatives in 1988, Franchot remarked, "I am a liberal, I am proud to be a Democrat who is in the progressive wing of the party." He represented liberal-leaning Montgomery County in the Maryland House of Delegates and was regarded as one of Maryland's most liberal delegates, but took positions at odds with his district. After Franchot was elected Comptroller, he took a rightward turn on fiscal issues. Former Republican governor of Maryland Bob Ehrlich notes this shift in his book Turn This Car Around, writing: "Business groups large and small joined in a historic campaign to repeal the new tax. Surprisingly, newly elected State Comptroller Peter Franchot, one of the legislature's most progressive votes during a twenty-year career in the Maryland House of Delegates, joined the pro-business, anti-tax chorus."

Franchot identifies as an "independent Democrat", holding fiscally conservative and socially liberal views. In December 2014, before Governor-elect Larry Hogan was sworn in, Franchot pledged a bipartisan alliance with the incoming governor, and the two have worked together on various causes on the Maryland Board of Public Works. He has been described by progressive news outlet Maryland Matters as being "closer to Republican Governor Larry Hogan than he is to any elected Democrat."

=== Abortion ===
In 1991, Franchot sponsored legislation to provide access to abortion in Maryland while requiring physicians to inform minors' parents when their children seek an abortion. The bill passed and was signed into law by Governor William Donald Schaefer on February 18, 1991.

After the Alabama General Assembly passed the Human Life Protection Act in 2019, Franchot called for a boycott of Alabama-based businesses and proposed divesting state taxpayers from being spent in Alabama. He later backed down from this stance, voting for a foster care contract with Seraaj Family Homes, an Alabama-based child placement services company, in June 2019.

Following the leak of a draft majority opinion for the Supreme Court case Dobbs v. Jackson Women's Health Organization, Franchot signaled support for codifying reproductive rights into the Constitution of Maryland. In May 2022, Franchot sent a letter to Governor Larry Hogan, asking him to release $3.5 million in funds to train abortion care providers as part of House Bill 937, or the Abortion Care Access Act. Hogan denied the request.

=== COVID-19 pandemic ===
Franchot criticized the Hogan administration's use of emergency contracts to pay for the state's COVID response efforts. He criticized the governor's purchase of 500,000 COVID-19 test kits from South Korea, expressing concerns about the transparency and accountability in what happened to the tests. In February 2021, he wrote an op-ed for Maryland Matters criticizing the governor's response to the COVID-19 pandemic.

On July 1, 2022, Franchot announced that he had tested positive for COVID-19.

=== Education ===
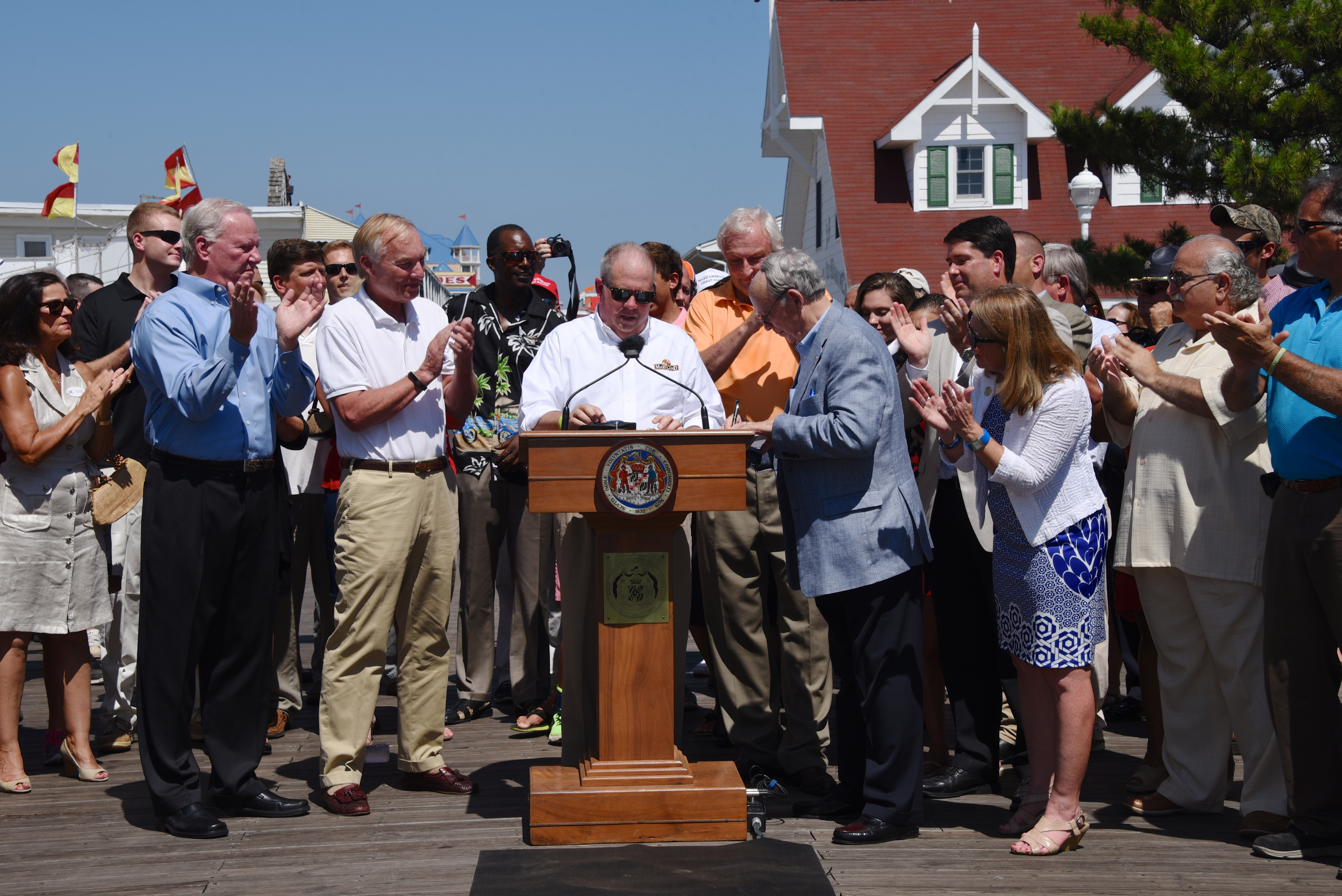
Franchot (left) joining Governor Hogan (center) at press conference where he signed an executive order requiring schools to start after Labor Day, 2016

Franchot supports having a post-Labor Day start for Maryland public schools, launching a "Let Summer Be Summer" campaign to move the start of the school year to after Labor Day in 2015. In August 2016, Franchot joined Governor Larry Hogan at a press conference where he signed an executive order requiring all public schools to begin classes after Labor Day. He opposed legislation passed by the Maryland General Assembly in the 2019 legislative session that would give local school boards the choice to start school years earlier than Labor Day.

During the campaign, Franchot said that he would support limiting or eliminating standardized testing in classrooms. He opposes the Blueprint for Maryland's Future, saying that he would rather shift the state's school curriculum to include teacher buy-ins and lessons that offer students "skill and knowledge about the modern economy". He also opposed tax reforms to pay for the Blueprint's proposals. He later reversed his opposition to the Blueprint, saying, "I was a bit of a skeptic because it didn't have any funding applied to it... I will implement what the legislature wants, but I was skeptical about the dollar amounts". In June 2022, Franchot said that he opposed raising taxes to fund the Blueprint.

=== Environment ===
During the campaign, Franchot pledged to make Maryland the first net-zero state for carbon emissions by 2030, protect and clean the Chesapeake Bay, and build a statewide transit system. In April 2022, Franchot and seven other gubernatorial candidates signed a pledge with the Chesapeake Climate Action Network to support legislation to transition the state to use 100 percent carbon-free electricity by 2035 and to remove trash incineration from the state's "clean energy" classification in 2023.

Franchot has faced criticism from environmentalists for his support of proposals to widen the Capital Beltway and Interstate 270, and to rebuild the American Legion Bridge, but he defends his stance by arguing that most vehicles on the road will be powered by electricity rather than gasoline by the time the improvements are made to the highways and bridges.

=== Gun control ===
In 1988, Franchot sponsored legislation that restricted the sale and manufacture of handguns. The bill passed and became law on May 23, 1988.

=== Minimum wage ===
Franchot expressed concern over a proposal from Governor Martin O'Malley to increase the state's minimum wage to $10.10 an hour by 2017, saying that legislators should consider its potential negative impacts on small business owners. In 2020, Franchot refused to pause the automatic increase in the state's minimum wage during the COVID-19 pandemic.

=== National politics ===
Franchot endorsed U.S. senator from Illinois Barack Obama for president on January 10, 2008. He endorsed former secretary of state Hillary Clinton for president on November 17, 2015. Franchot endorsed Senator Amy Klobuchar for president on February 17, 2020.

=== Redistricting ===
Franchot supports using a bipartisan commission comprising an equal number of Democrats, Republicans, and Independents to draw the state's congressional and legislative districts. He also supports splitting the state legislature's 47 multi-member districts in 141 single-member districts. Franchot supported a 2012 ballot referendum to repeal the state's congressional maps. The measure was rejected 64%–34% in November 2012.

=== Social issues ===
Franchot supports the removal of Confederate monuments in Maryland, rallying for the removal of the Talbot Boys statue on social media. The Talbot Boys statue, the last Confederate monument on public land in Maryland, was removed in March 2022.

In December 2012, Franchot said that he would allow same-sex married couples to file taxes jointly.

=== Taxes ===
Franchot opposes levying a carbon tax, saying that it's more important to get a buy-in from fossil fuel companies to develop carbon capture technology. Franchot opposed legislation introduced during the 2012 legislative session that would levy a fuel tax indexed to inflation.

After Governor Hogan signed legislation enacting a 30-day gas tax holiday amid the Russo-Ukrainian War, Franchot said that "the hammer" would fall on gas station owners who refused to lower fuel prices. In April 2022, Franchot wrote in an op-ed to Maryland Matters encouraging the Maryland General Assembly to extend the state's 30-day gas tax holiday by an additional 90 days. In May 2022, Governor Hogan wrote to Franchot asking him to suspend the mandated gas tax increase, to which Franchot replied asking Hogan to declare a state of emergency to suspend the gas tax until September. Franchot called for the General Assembly to form a special legislative session to pass legislation giving him the authority to suspend the state's inflation-based gas tax increase, which is scheduled to take effect in July. Legislative leaders rejected Franchot's request, saying that the gas tax hike pause would "not result in Marylanders seeking a price reduction at the pump" and would cost the state over $200 million in transportation funding.

=== Transportation ===
Franchot supports building the proposed Red Line transit line, but says the state should consider a monorail instead of "automatically going with conventional rail or light rail".

== Electoral history ==
Maryland House of Delegates 20th District Democratic Primary Election, 1986
Party	Candidate	Votes	%
Democratic	Peter Franchot	6,912	17
Democratic	Sheila Ellis Hixson	5,921	14
Democratic	Dana Lee Dembrow	5,341	13
Democratic	Robert G. Berger	5,068	12
Democratic	Louis H. D'Ovidio	4,956	12
Democratic	DeVance Walker Jr.	3,904	10
Democratic	Mary Dunphy	2,449	6
Democratic	Fredrica F. Hodges	2,179	5
Democratic	John Mennell	1,403	3
Democratic	H. Evan DuQuette	706	2

Maryland House of Delegates 20th District General Election, 1986
Party	Candidate	Votes	%
Democratic	Sheila Ellis Hixson	17,255	23
Democratic	Peter Franchot	17,596	24
Democratic	Dana Lee Dembrow	17,457	24
Republican	Stuart T. Eisen	7,483	10
Republican	James Gordon Bennett	7,431	10
Republican	Ronald T. Richard	6,572	9

Maryland's 8th Congressional District Democratic Primary Election, 1988
Party	Candidate	Votes	%
Democratic	Peter Franchot	36,734	56
Democratic	Rosemary Glynn	16,748	26
Democratic	Ralph K. Shur	4,833	7
Democratic	George E. Benns	1,725	3

Maryland's 8th Congressional District Election, 1988
Party	Candidate	Votes	%
Republican	Constance A. Morella (inc.)	172,619	62.7
Democratic	Peter Franchot	102,478	37.3

Maryland House of Delegates 20th District Democratic Primary Election, 1990
Party	Candidate	Votes	%
Democratic	Peter Franchot	8,202	22
Democratic	Dana Lee Dembrow	7,959	21
Democratic	Sheila Ellis Hixson	7,553	20
Democratic	Robert G. Berger	7,221	19
Democratic	Diane Kirchenbauer	6,879	18

Maryland House of Delegates 20th District General Election, 1990
Party	Candidate	Votes	%
Democratic	Dana Lee Dembrow	18,303	34
Democratic	Sheila Ellis Hixson	17,958	33
Democratic	Peter Franchot	17,871	33

Maryland House of Delegates 20th District Democratic Primary Election, 1994
Party	Candidate	Votes	%
Democratic	Dana Lee Dembrow	8,276	27
Democratic	Sheila Ellis Hixson	7,312	24
Democratic	Peter Franchot	7,307	24
Democratic	Steven Silverman	4,979	16
Democratic	Michael Graham	3,082	10

Maryland House of Delegates 20th District General Election, 1994
Party	Candidate	Votes	%
Democratic	Dana Lee Dembrow	19,679	30
Democratic	Sheila Ellis Hixson	19,423	29
Democratic	Peter Franchot	18,854	28
Democratic	James Harrison	8,248	12

Maryland House of Delegates 20th District Democratic Primary Election, 1998
Party	Candidate	Votes	%
Democratic	Dana Lee Dembrow	7,758	30
Democratic	Sheila Ellis Hixson	7,558	29
Democratic	Peter Franchot	6,487	25
Democratic	Diane Nixon	3,117	12
Democratic	Robert B. Bates	1,276	5

Maryland House of Delegates 20th District General Election, 1998
Party	Candidate	Votes	%
Democratic	Dana Lee Dembrow	22,396	27
Democratic	Sheila Ellis Hixson	21,895	27
Democratic	Peter Franchot	21,208	26
Republican	John C. Leahy	6,020	7
Republican	James K. Harrison Jr.	5,602	7
Republican	Franklin U. Hackenberg	5,163	6

Maryland House of Delegates 20th District Democratic Primary Election, 2002
Party	Candidate	Votes	%
Democratic	Sheila Ellis Hixson	9,720	28.3
Democratic	Peter Franchot	8,278	24.1
Democratic	Gareth E. Murray	4,125	12.0
Democratic	Dana Lee Dembrow	3,601	10.5
Democratic	Diane Nixon	3,556	10.3
Democratic	Luis Alvarez	2,444	7.1
Democratic	E. Richard Rosenthal	1,674	4.9
Democratic	Robert B. Bates	968	2.8

Maryland House of Delegates 20th District General Election, 2002
Party	Candidate	Votes	%
Democratic	Sheila Ellis Hixson	19,841	26.72
Democratic	Peter Franchot	18,273	24.61
Democratic	Gareth E. Murray	15,803	21.28
Green	Linda Schade	10,101	13.60
Republican	Jae Donald Collins	5,294	7.13
Republican	Kenneth Klein	4,855	6.54
Write-In		96	0.13

Maryland Comptroller Democratic Primary Election, 2006
Party	Candidate	Votes	%
Democratic	Peter Franchot	215,192	36.5
Democratic	Janet S. Owens	200,292	34.0
Democratic	William Donald Schaefer (inc.)	174,071	29.5

Maryland Comptroller General Election, 2006
Party	Candidate	Votes	%
Democratic	Peter Franchot	1,016,677	59.0
Republican	Anne M. McCarthy	703,874	40.8
Write-In		3,219	0.2

Maryland Comptroller General Election, 2010
Party	Candidate	Votes	%
Democratic	Peter Franchot	1,087,836	61.1
Republican	William Henry Campbell	691,461	38.8
Write-In		1,799	0.1

Maryland Comptroller General Election, 2014
Party	Candidate	Votes	%
Democratic	Peter Franchot	1,061,267	62.7
Republican	William Henry Campbell	630,109	37.2
Write-In		1,941	0.1
Write-In	Anajli Reed Phukan	595	0.0

Maryland Comptroller General Election, 2018
Party	Candidate	Votes	%
Democratic	Peter Franchot	1,620,264	72.1
Republican	Anjali Reed Phukan	624,871	27.8
Write-In		3,103	0.1

Maryland gubernatorial Democratic primary, 2022
Party	Candidate	Votes	%
Democratic	Wes Moore; Aruna Miller	217,524	32.4
Democratic	Tom Perez; Shannon Sneed	202,175	30.1
Democratic	Peter Franchot; Monique Anderson-Walker	141,586	21.1
Democratic	Rushern Baker (withdrawn); Nancy Navarro (withdrawn)	26,594	4.0
Democratic	Doug Gansler; Candace Hollingsworth	25,481	3.8
Democratic	John King Jr.; Michelle Siri	24,882	3.7
Democratic	Ashwani Jain; LaTrece Hawkins Lytes	13,784	2.1
Democratic	Jon Baron; Natalie Williams	11,880	1.8
Democratic	Jerome Segal; Justinian M. Dispenza	4,276	0.6
Democratic	Ralph Jaffe; Mark Greben	2,978	0.4

Political offices
Preceded by William Schaefer	Comptroller of Maryland; 2007–2023	Succeeded by Brooke Lierman
