= Joseline Peña-Melnyk =

American politician (born 1966)

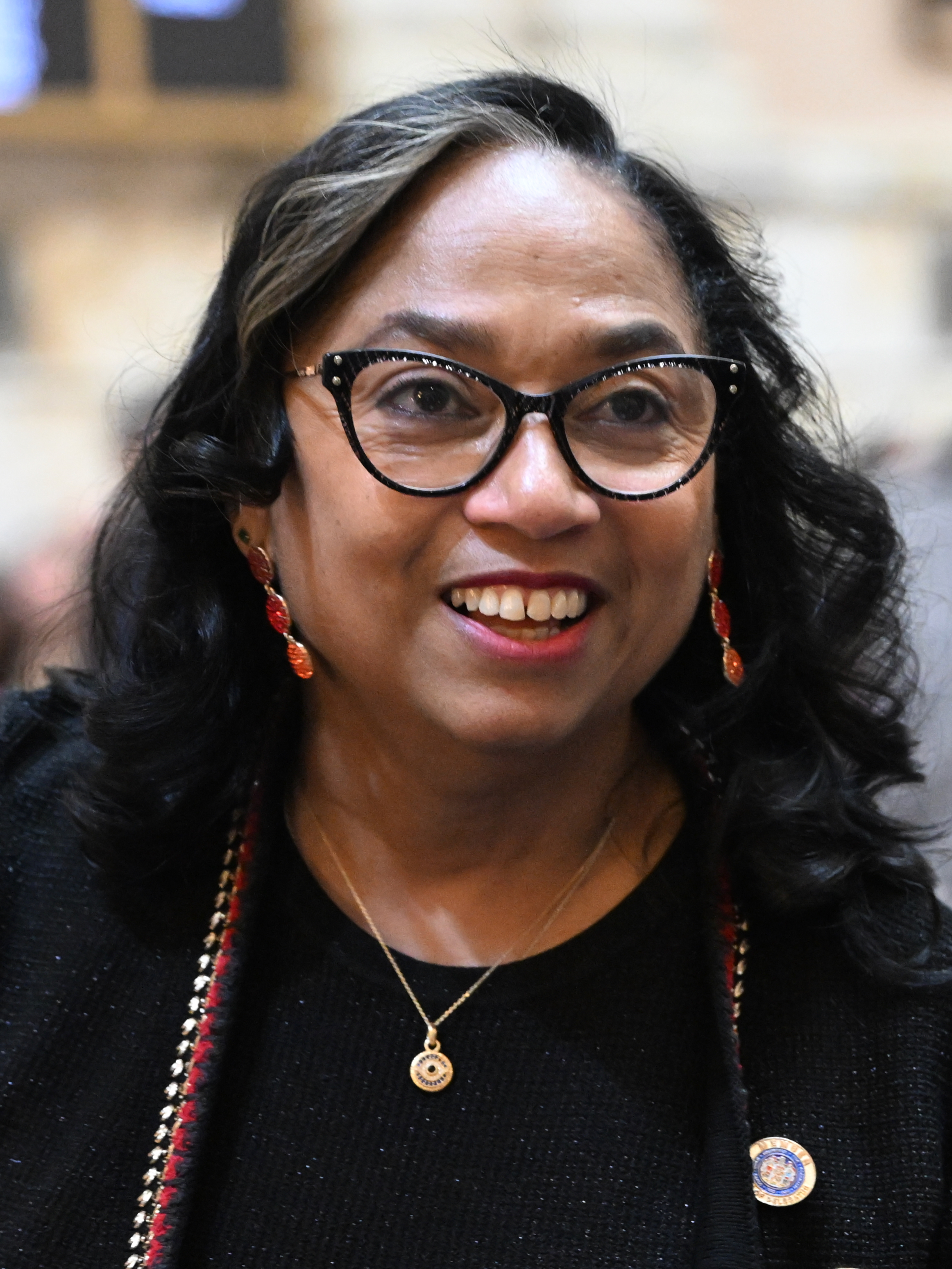
- Peña-Melnyk in 2025

109th Speaker of the Maryland House of Delegates
- Incumbent
- Assumed office December 16, 2025
- Preceded by: Dana Stein (acting)

Member of the Maryland House of Delegates from the 21st district
- Incumbent
- Assumed office January 10, 2007 Serving with Ben Barnes, Mary A. Lehman
- Preceded by: Pauline Menes

Personal details
- Born: Joseline Peña; June 27, 1966 (age 60) Dominican Republic
- Citizenship: Dominican Republic; United States (1983–present)
- Party: Democratic
- Spouse: Markian Melnyk (m. 1993)
- Children: 3
- Education: Buffalo State University (BS); University at Buffalo (JD)
- Peña-Melnyk's voice Peña-Melnyk on the 2026 State of the Union Address and the second presidency of Donald Trump. Recorded February 24, 2026

Joseline A. Peña-Melnyk (née Peña, born June 27, 1966) is an American politician and attorney serving as the 109th speaker of the Maryland House of Delegates since 2025. A member of the Democratic Party, she has represented the 21st district since 2007.

Born in the Dominican Republic, Peña-Melnyk immigrated to New York with her family when she was eight years old. She graduated from Buffalo State College and the State University of New York at Buffalo, afterwards starting her law career in the Defender Association of Philadelphia before moving to Washington, D.C., where she worked as a prosecutor in the U.S. Attorney's office. Peña-Melnyk was elected to the city council of College Park, Maryland, in 2003 and to the Maryland House of Delegates in 2006. She unsuccessfully ran for the U.S. House of Representatives in Maryland's 4th congressional district in 2016, coming in third behind Anthony Brown and Glenn Ivey.

In December 2025, after Adrienne A. Jones announced that she would step down as speaker, Peña-Melnyk was unanimously elected to succeed her. She is the first Afro-Latina and second woman, after Jones, to lead the Maryland House of Delegates.

== Early life and education ==
Born in the Dominican Republic on June 27, 1966, Peña was raised in a poverty-stricken family who relied on public assistance and welfare programs. When Peña was seven or eight years old, she, her mother, and her sister immigrated to New York on family visas to join their father. Her parents divorced about a year after they arrived to the United States. Peña's mother eventually left welfare and worked in factories, earning enough to move the family to an apartment. Peña returned to the Dominican Republic at age 11 with her sister while her mother stayed behind to work jobs in the Garment District and send money home. She returned to the United States at age 14, and became a U.S. citizen in 1983, attaining citizenship after her mother naturalized.

Peña learned English in school and from watching Sesame Street and Mister Rogers' Neighborhood on television. While in New York City, she helped with translation services for her mother and other Spanish-speaking families in the city's Washington Heights neighborhood. Peña moved out after a bad disagreement with her mother, staying with friends and renting a room during her last few months at John F. Kennedy High School. She later attended Buffalo State College, paying her way through school with a series of retail jobs and by volunteering at a shelter for battered women before graduating with a B.S. in criminal justice. She later graduated from the State University of New York at Buffalo, where she earned her Juris Doctor degree. Peña was the first in her family to achieve a college degree.

== Career ==
=== Legal career ===
After law school, Peña started her legal career in the Defender Association of Philadelphia before moving to Washington, D.C., to join her then-fiancé Markian Melnyk after failing the bar exam. She later passed the test in 1993 and became a court-appointed defense attorney, advocating for foster children and abused children in the Superior Court of the District of Columbia. Peña-Melnyk later joined the office of the U.S. Attorney for the District of Columbia as a prosecutor before leaving the practice after the birth of her first child in 1999. She continued to be active in public life, joining the board of CASA de Maryland and winning a seat on the College Park City Council in 2003.

=== Maryland House of Delegates ===
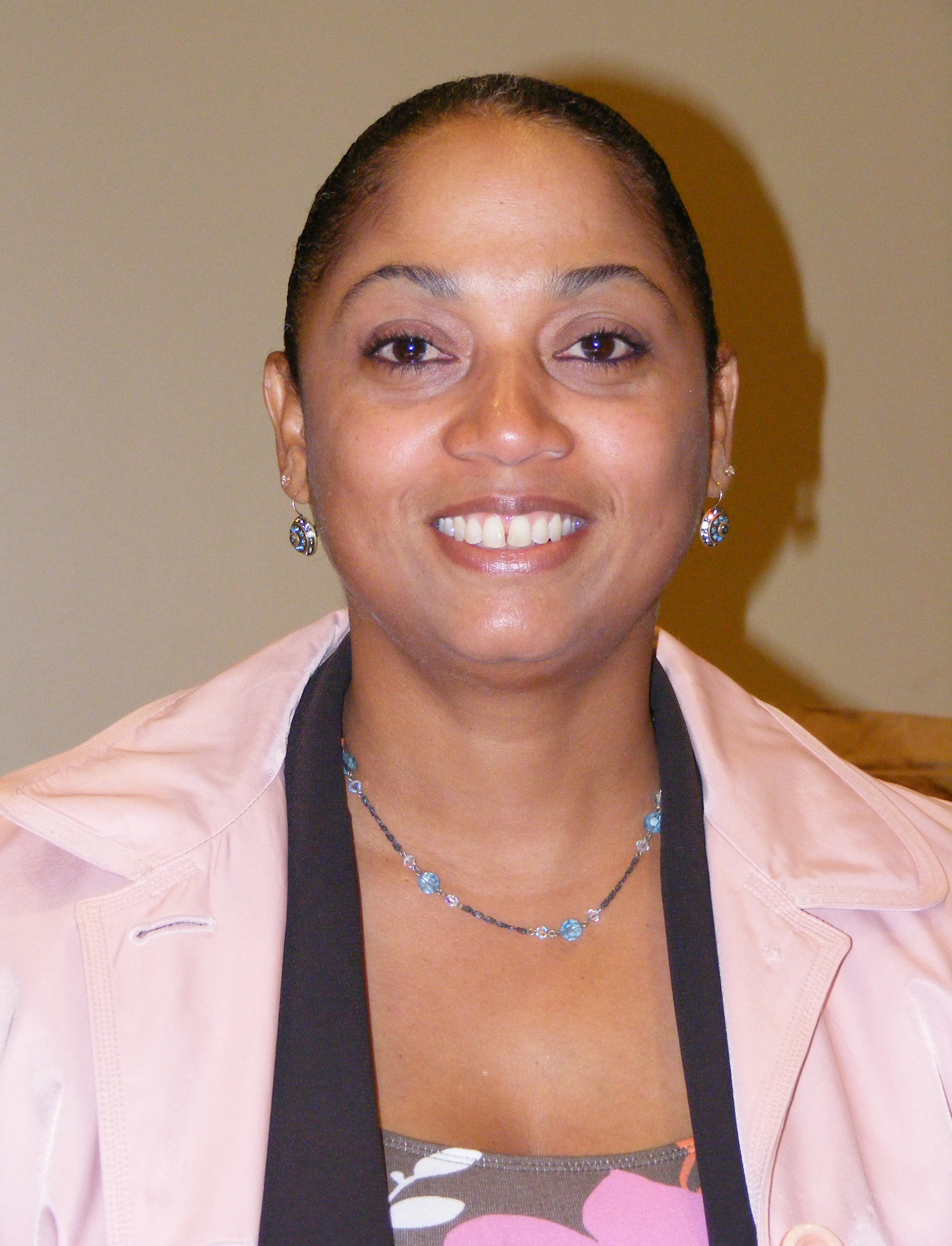
Peña-Melnyk in 2007

Peña-Melnyk was a member of the House Health and Government Operations Committee from 2007 to 2025. She served on the Public Health and Long Term Care, Government Operations & Long Term Care, Insurance and Pharmaceuticals, and Public Health and Minority Health Disparities subcommittees. In 2022, she was appointed Chair of the Health and Government Operations Committee, becoming the highest-ranking Latina in the history of the General Assembly.

Peña-Melnyk is also a member of the Legislative Black Caucus of Maryland and the Women Legislators of Maryland. She is also a founding member of the Maryland Legislative Latino Caucus and served as its first chairperson. In October 2019, Peña-Melnyk, who is Black and Latina, criticized a proposed plan that would require members of both the Legislative Black Caucus and the Legislative Latino Caucus to choose between being a member of either caucus. Following her criticism, the plan was withdrawn for consideration.

Peña-Melnyk was a delegate to the 2012, 2020, and 2024 Democratic National Conventions. She was also a member of the electoral college in the 2012 election, casting her vote for Barack Obama in a ceremony at the Maryland State House.

In 2019, Peña-Melnyk motioned during a meeting of members of the House of Delegates Democratic Caucus to nominate Adrienne A. Jones as the Speaker of the Maryland House of Delegates, a position to which Jones was eventually elected in May 2019.

During her tenure as county executive, Peña-Melnyk was one of several Latino officials to criticize Prince George's County Executive Angela Alsobrooks for not appointing a single person of Hispanic descent to her 39-member cabinet, despite Latinos making up 21.2% of the county's population. During the Democratic primary of the 2024 United States Senate election in Maryland, she declined to endorse Alsobrooks, instead endorsing and appearing in ads for U.S. Representative David Trone. After Trone was defeated by Alsobrooks in the May 2024 Democratic primary, Peña-Melnyk endorsed Alsobrooks in the general election.

=== 2016 congressional campaign ===
On March 14, 2015, Peña-Melnyk announced that she would run for the United States House of Representatives in Maryland's 4th congressional district, seeking to succeed U.S. Representative Donna F. Edwards, who unsuccessfully ran for United States Senate in 2016. Her platform included raising the federal minimum wage and reducing college loan interest rates. During the Democratic primary, she received endorsements from Democracy for America, EMILY's List, Sierra Club, the Congressional Progressive Caucus, and Latino Victory Fund. If elected, she would have been the first Dominican American in Congress. Peña-Melnyk was defeated in the Democratic primary by former Lieutenant Governor of Maryland Anthony Brown, placing third with 19.0 percent of the vote.

=== Speaker of the House of Delegates ===
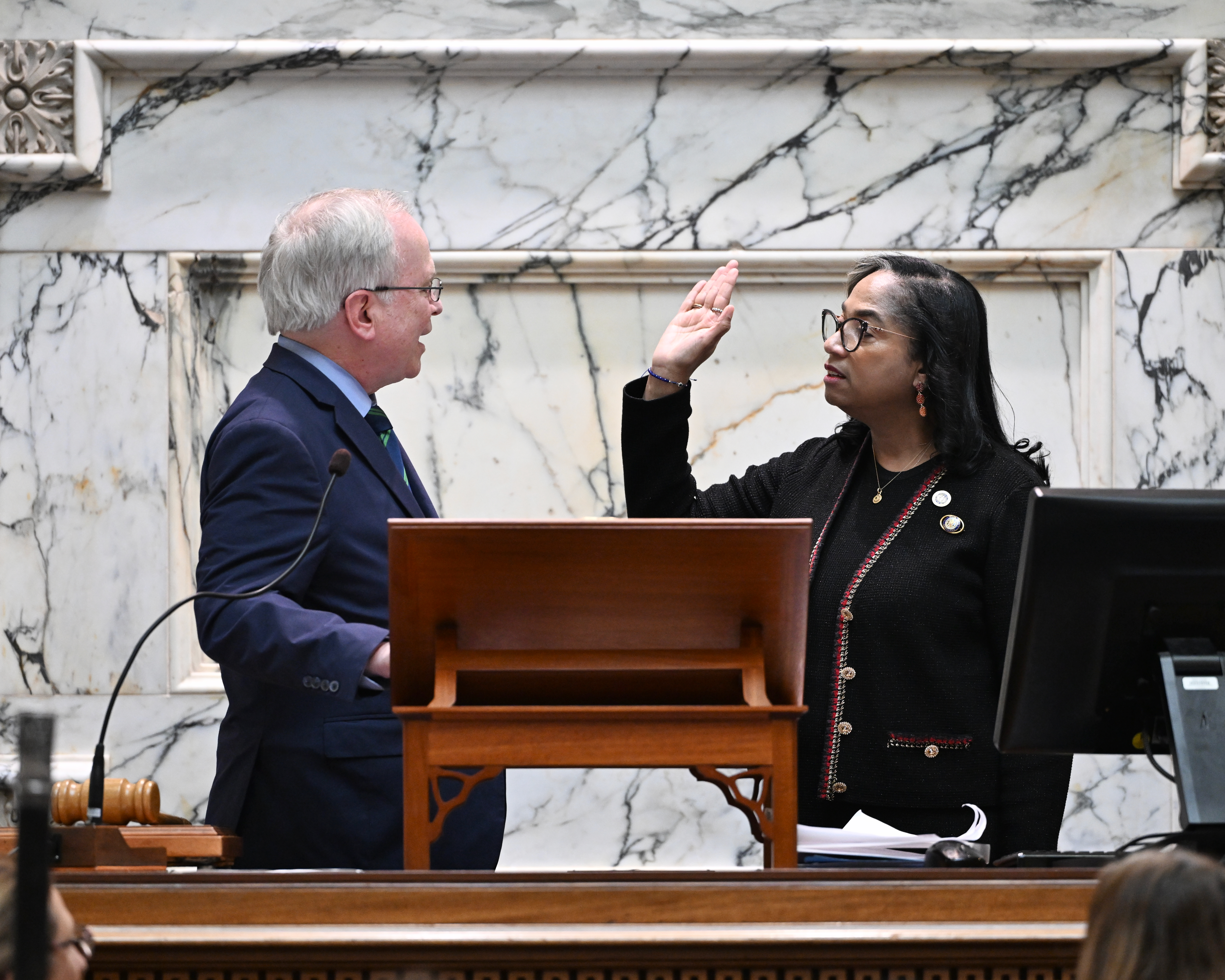
Peña-Melnyk is sworn in as speaker by then-speaker pro tempore Dana Stein, 2025

In December 2025, after Adrienne A. Jones announced that she would be stepping down as Speaker of the Maryland House of Delegates, Peña-Melnyk reportedly began making phone calls to her colleagues about a potential run for speaker. She confirmed her candidacy a few days later, announcing that the other candidates in the race—C. T. Wilson, Ben Barnes, and Jheanelle Wilkins—had dropped out of the race and endorsed her candidacy. Peña-Melnyk was unanimously elected speaker by the Maryland House of Delegates on December 16, 2025, becoming the second woman and first Afro-Latina to lead a chamber of the Maryland General Assembly. She is also the first person born in the Dominican Republic to lead either chamber of the Maryland General Assembly, and the first speaker who was not born in Maryland since C. Ferdinand Sybert.

During her tenure as speaker, Peña-Melnyk has adopted a conciliatory approach to leadership focused on relationship building and inclusiveness. Upon her election, she announced plans to create the Government, Labor, and Elections Committee, a new House standing committee dedicated solely to government operations, and the House Rural Caucus to give rural communities a stronger voice in the legislature. She also presided over the override of dozens of bills vetoed by Governor Wes Moore. Among the overridden measures were legislation establishing a commission to study reparations to victims of slavery or their descendants, as well as a bill requiring state agencies to study the economic and environmental impacts of data center development in the state. During her first full session as speaker, Peña-Melnyk supported several bills to restrict immigration enforcement in Maryland, increase government transparency, and address affordability concerns. She also testified in support of bills to better inform patients about mammogram results and require more training and education on menopause, and supported unsuccessful efforts to redraw Maryland's congressional districts.

== Political positions ==
Media outlets have described Peña-Melnyk as a progressive.

=== Energy ===
During the 2026 legislative session, amid increasing electricity prices in Maryland, Peña-Melnyk supported a bill that would prohibit utility companies from using ratepayer funds on executive bonuses. She also introduced the Continuing the Next Generation Energy Act, which would make various adjustments to the state's EmPOWER energy efficiency program, increase the number of data centers with a separate tariff for large load customers, and prohibit utilities from recouping extra costs through additional consumer charges.

=== Healthcare ===
In November 2008, Peña-Melnyk supported a bill requiring all college students to have health insurance, arguing that all college students should be held to the same standard as student athletes and international students, who are required to have health insurance.

During the 2018 legislative session, Peña-Melnyk introduced a bill to ask the federal government to divert money to Maryland used to offset the cost of high-risk patients on the Affordable Care Act's insurance pool, instead using it under a new "reinsurance program" under the Maryland Health Benefit Exchange. The bill passed and became law with Governor Larry Hogan's signature, and the plan was approved by federal regulators in August 2018.

During the 2019 legislative session, Peña-Melnyk introduced a bill that would require Marylanders without health insurance to pay a state penalty that would go toward purchasing coverage. The bill overwhelmingly passed in the Maryland House of Delegates and unanimously passed the Maryland Senate, and was signed into law by Governor Larry Hogan on May 13, 2019.

During the 2021 legislative session, Peña-Melnyk introduced the Shirley Nathan-Pulliam Health Equity Act, a bill that would create the Maryland Commission on Health Equity to examine racial, ethnic, cultural, or socioeconomic disparities in healthcare. She also introduced a bill that would require the Office of Minority Health and Health Disparities to work with the Maryland Health Care Commission to publish a "health disparity policy report card" comparing the state's racial and ethnic identifiers against the state's population by demographic, and another to require licensed health professionals to undergo implicit bias training when they apply to have their licenses renewed. All three bills passed and became law.

During the 2022 legislative session, Peña-Melnyk introduced bills to provide undocumented pregnant women access to Medicaid and implement a $30 a month cap on insulin, both of which passed and became law. She also introduced a bill that would expand Medicaid for immigrants regardless of their legal status, which failed to move out of committee. Peña-Melnyk supported the bill again when it was reintroduced during the 2024 legislative session, during which it passed and was signed into law by Governor Wes Moore.

During the 2023 legislative session, Peña-Melnyk introduced a bill that would authorize supervised injection sites in Maryland.

=== Housing ===
During the 2022 legislative session, Peña-Melnyk introduced a bill to allow tenants to petition courts to shield records in eviction cases where the failure to pay rent was due to an income loss caused by the COVID-19 pandemic. The bill passed and became law on May 29, 2022.

=== Immigration ===
During the 2007 legislative session, Peña-Melnyk supported a bill that would make children of illegal immigrants eligible for in-state tuition at Maryland universities. In October 2012, she campaigned in support of Question 4, which upheld the Maryland DREAM Act. During the 2020 legislative session, Peña-Melnyk introduced a bill that would prohibit state law enforcement officers from referring cases to U.S. Immigration and Customs Enforcement.

In April 2025, Peña-Melnyk praised Chris Van Hollen's visit to meet with Kilmar Abrego Garcia, saying that his trip brought hope to the Latino community during a trying time. Upon Abrego Garcia's return to the United States in June 2025, she told The Baltimore Banner that she "prays that he has due process" and supported providing his family with security.

During the 2026 legislative session, Peña-Melnyk supported legislation to ban 287(g) program agreements in Maryland.

=== National politics ===
During the 2008 Democratic Party presidential primaries, Peña-Melnyk supported the candidacy of U.S. senator Barack Obama. In July 2015, she protested Donald Trump at the construction site of the Trump International Hotel in Washington, D.C.

In December 2025, Peña-Melnyk endorsed mid-decade redistricting in Maryland, later supporting a congressional redistricting plan proposed by the Governor's Redistricting Advisory Commission that would redraw Maryland's 1st congressional district to improve the Democratic Party's chances of winning the district. In April 2026, she criticized the U.S. Supreme Court's ruling in Louisiana v. Callais, calling for national redistricting reforms to prevent the disfranchisement of millions of minority voters across the United States. In July 2026, Peña-Melnyk and Senate president Bill Ferguson announced that the legislature would convene for a special session on redistricting following the Callais decision, during which the General Assembly passed a constitutional amendment that would exempt Maryland's congressional districts from redistricting guidelines in the state constitution.

=== Social issues ===
In March 2005, Peña-Melnyk testified against a resolution to make English the official language of Maryland, saying that she strongly believed that the bill "contradicts federal law" and would "create hatred".

During the 2010 legislative session, Peña-Melnyk introduced the No Representation Without Population Act, which would count people who are in prison at their home addresses instead of the district where they are incarcerated. The bill passed and was signed into law by Governor Martin O'Malley.

During the 2011 legislative session, Peña-Melnyk supported the Civil Marriage Protection Act, which would've legalized same-sex marriage in Maryland. She also introduced the Gender Identity Anti-Discrimination Act, a bill that would prohibit employers, creditors, and housing providers from discriminating against transgender people. After Peña-Melnyk removed a provision that would've required public accommodations for transgender people, the bill passed the House of Delegates in an 86–52 vote, but died in the Senate. In an interview with The Baltimore Sun, Peña-Melnyk said that the decision to exclude public accommodations from the bill was solely her own, saying that it would have gone nowhere had the provision remained in the bill. Following the beating of Chrissy Lee Polis in April 2011, Peña-Melnyk said that she would convince Senate President Thomas V. Miller Jr. that protections for transgender people "need to be passed". Peña-Melnyk supported a bill to ban transgender discrimination in public accommodations, housing, and employment during the 2014 legislative session, which passed and was signed into law by Governor O'Malley.

Peña-Melnyk supports codifying the right to abortion into the Maryland Constitution, and criticized a statement from Governor Larry Hogan in 2018 that downplayed needing to do so, calling it "insufficient". Following the U.S. Supreme Court's decision in Dobbs v. Jackson Women's Health Organization, which overturned Roe v. Wade and Planned Parenthood v. Casey, Peña-Melnyk said that she was gearing up to codify abortion rights in the state constitution. During the 2022 legislative session, she introduced the Healthy Babies Equity Act, a bill that would provide prenatal care to individuals regardless of immigration status. The bill passed and became law without Governor Larry Hogan's signature. During the 2023 legislative session, Peña-Melnyk supported a bill creating a statewide referendum on enshrining abortion rights into the state constitution, calling it "the single most important piece of legislation about reproductive rights in our lifetime".

During the 2019 legislative session, Peña-Melnyk introduced a bill that would create the Lynching Truth and Reconciliation Commission to facilitate workshops and train commissioners and members of their staff on racial healing. The bill passed and became law.

During the 2020 legislative session, Peña-Melnyk introduced a bill that would require health care professionals treating patients in perinatal units to receive implicit bias training at least once every two years. The bill passed through both chambers of the Maryland General Assembly unanimously, becoming one of the first implicit bias training laws in the United States.

In March 2021, Peña-Melnyk spoke in support of a bill that would make Juneteenth a state and employee-paid holiday in Maryland.

During the 2025 legislative session, Peña-Melnyk supported a bill establishing a commission to study reparations for victims of slavery or their descendants.

During the 2026 legislative session, Peña-Melnyk introduced a bill to ban unlicensed foster placements and establish a rapid response placement team to organize appropriate placements for hospital overstays longer than 72 hours. She also supported Kanayiah's Law, which would create an ombudsman position for child welfare in the Office of the Attorney General of Maryland.

=== Taxes ===
During the 2021 legislative session, Peña-Melnyk supported expanding Maryland's Earned Income Tax Credit to provide relief to tax-paying immigrants who were left out of the state's RELIEF Act because they didn't have a Social Security number. During the 2025 legislative session, she introduced legislation that would impose a two-cent tax on sugary beverages.

In January 2026, amid a $1.2 billion budget deficit, Peña-Melnyk ruled out any tax increases to help close the deficit, opting instead for cuts to government spending.

=== Transportation ===
In December 2017, Peña-Melnyk said she opposed a proposed Amtrak route for a maglev train between Baltimore and Washington, D.C.

== Personal life ==
Peña-Melnyk married her husband, Markian Melnyk, in 1993. Together, they live in College Park, Maryland, and have three children, including twins. She has described herself as raised Catholic, though she said she drifted from the church over its stances against same-sex marriage and transgender rights.

== Electoral history ==
2006 Maryland House of Delegates 21st district election
Primary election
Party	Candidate	Votes	%
Democratic	Barbara A. Frush (incumbent)	5,378	20.8
Democratic	Joseline Peña-Melnyk	5,255	20.3
Democratic	Ben Barnes	5,169	20.0
Democratic	Brian R. Moe (incumbent)	4,355	16.8
Democratic	Tekisha Everette	2,042	7.9
Democratic	Mark Cook	1,771	6.9
Democratic	Michael B. Sarich	1,346	5.2
Democratic	Jon Black	538	2.1
Total votes		25,854	100.0
General election
Democratic	Ben Barnes	18,453	29.6
Democratic	Barbara A. Frush (incumbent)	18,279	29.3
Democratic	Joseline Peña-Melnyk	18,001	28.9
Republican	Neil B. Sood	7,349	11.8
Write-in		206	0.3
Total votes		62,288	100.0

2010 Maryland House of Delegates 21st district election
Primary election
Party	Candidate	Votes	%
Democratic	Joseline Peña-Melnyk (incumbent)	6,608	29.2
Democratic	Ben Barnes (incumbent)	6,225	27.5
Democratic	Barbara A. Frush (incumbent)	5,786	25.5
Democratic	Brian K. McDaniel	2,682	11.8
Democratic	Devin F. Tucker	1,358	6.0
Total votes		22,659	100.0
General election
Democratic	Ben Barnes (incumbent)	18,954	25.2
Democratic	Barbara A. Frush (incumbent)	18,689	24.8
Democratic	Joseline Peña-Melnyk (incumbent)	18,457	24.5
Republican	Scott W. Dibiasio	6,131	8.1
Republican	Jason W. Papanikolas	6,013	8.0
Republican	Kat Nelson	5,822	7.7
Libertarian	K. Bryan Walker	1,151	1.5
Write-in		72	0.1
Total votes		75,289	100.0

2014 Maryland House of Delegates 21st district election
Primary election
Party	Candidate	Votes	%
Democratic	Barbara A. Frush (incumbent)	6,117	33.8
Democratic	Joseline Peña-Melnyk (incumbent)	6,039	33.4
Democratic	Ben Barnes (incumbent)	5,918	32.7
Total votes		18,074	100.0
General election
Democratic	Barbara A. Frush (incumbent)	18,157	28.7
Democratic	Ben Barnes (incumbent)	17,235	27.3
Democratic	Joseline Peña-Melnyk (incumbent)	16,880	26.7
Republican	Katherine M. Butcher	10,610	16.8
Write-in		284	0.4
Total votes		63,166	100.0

2016 Maryland's 4th congressional district Democratic primary election
Party	Candidate	Votes	%
Democratic	Anthony Brown	47,678	41.6
Democratic	Glenn Ivey	38,966	34.0
Democratic	Joseline Peña-Melnyk	21,724	19.0
Democratic	Warren Christopher	3,973	3.5
Democratic	Matthew Fogg	1,437	1.3
Democratic	Terence Strait	845	0.7
Total votes		114,623	100.0

2018 Maryland House of Delegates 21st district election
Primary election
Party	Candidate	Votes	%
Democratic	Joseline Peña-Melnyk (incumbent)	8,770	30.0
Democratic	Ben Barnes (incumbent)	7,449	25.5
Democratic	Mary A. Lehman	5,538	18.9
Democratic	Matt Dernoga	5,316	18.2
Democratic	Brencis Smith	1,169	4.0
Democratic	James E. McDowell Jr.	1,027	3.5
Total votes		29,269	100.0
General election
Democratic	Ben Barnes (incumbent)	27,567	26.3
Democratic	Joseline Peña-Melnyk (incumbent)	26,889	25.7
Democratic	Mary A. Lehman	26,809	25.6
Republican	Richard Douglas	8,519	8.1
Republican	Chike Anyanwu	8,313	7.9
Independent	Ray Ranker	6,472	6.2
Write-in		234	0.2
Total votes		104,803	100.0

2022 Maryland House of Delegates 21st district election
Primary election
Party	Candidate	Votes	%
Democratic	Joseline Peña-Melnyk (incumbent)	9,502	33.7
Democratic	Mary A. Lehman (incumbent)	9,381	33.2
Democratic	Ben Barnes (incumbent)	9,335	33.1
Total votes		28,218	100.0
General election
Democratic	Mary A. Lehman (incumbent)	22,333	33.63
Democratic	Joseline Peña-Melnyk (incumbent)	21,821	32.86
Democratic	Ben Barnes (incumbent)	21,531	32.42
Write-in		720	1.08
Total votes		66,405	100.0

Political offices
Preceded by Dana Stein; Acting	Speaker of the Maryland House of Delegates; 2025–present	Incumbent
