= Ben Barnes (Maryland politician) =

American politician (born 1975)

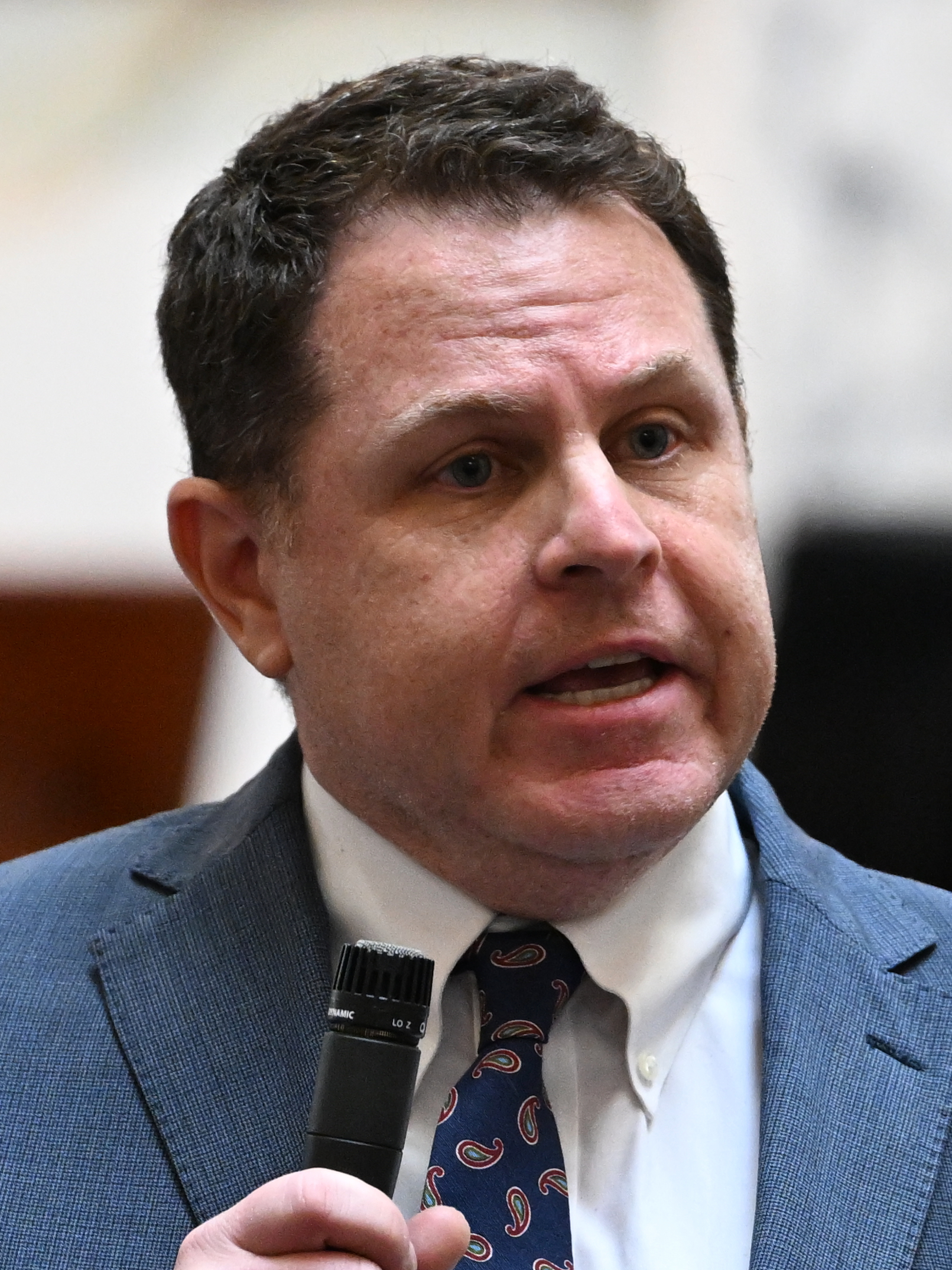
- Barnes in 2025

Member of the Maryland House of Delegates from the 21st district
- Incumbent
- Assumed office January 10, 2007 Serving with Joseline Peña-Melnyk and Mary A. Lehman
- Preceded by: Brian R. Moe

Personal details
- Born: Benjamin Scott Barnes; March 30, 1975 (age 51) Peoria, Illinois, U.S.
- Party: Democratic
- Spouse: Caitlin McDonough
- Children: 3
- Relatives: John McDonough (father-in-law)
- Education: University of North Carolina, Greensboro (BA); University of Baltimore (JD)

Benjamin Scott Barnes (born March 30, 1975) is an American politician who has served as a Democratic member of the Maryland House of Delegates representing the 21st district since 2007.

== Background ==
Barnes was born in Peoria, Illinois, on March 30, 1975. Raised by a single mother, Barnes grew up in Prince George's County, Maryland, graduated from Eleanor Roosevelt High School in 1993 before enrolling at the University of North Carolina at Greensboro, where he earned a Bachelor of Arts degree in economics and political science in 1998.

Barnes says he first got involved with politics as a child, attending pro-choice marches in Washington, D.C., with his family. He began working in politics shortly after graduating, first at People for the American Way as an organizer from 1999 to 2000. Afterwards, Barnes worked as a political and legislative advisor to Senate President Thomas V. Miller Jr., later earning a promotion to deputy legislative director. During his time with Miller, Barnes attended night classes at the University of Baltimore School of Law, graduating with a Juris Doctor in 2003. Barnes was admitted to the Maryland Bar in 2004, and clerked for Judge James J. Lombardi in the Prince George's County Circuit Court, 7th Judicial Circuit until 2005. Afterwards, he worked as an attorney in the Law Offices of Donna L. Crary until 2011, when he started his own law firm, Butler, Macleay & Barnes LLC.

== In the legislature ==
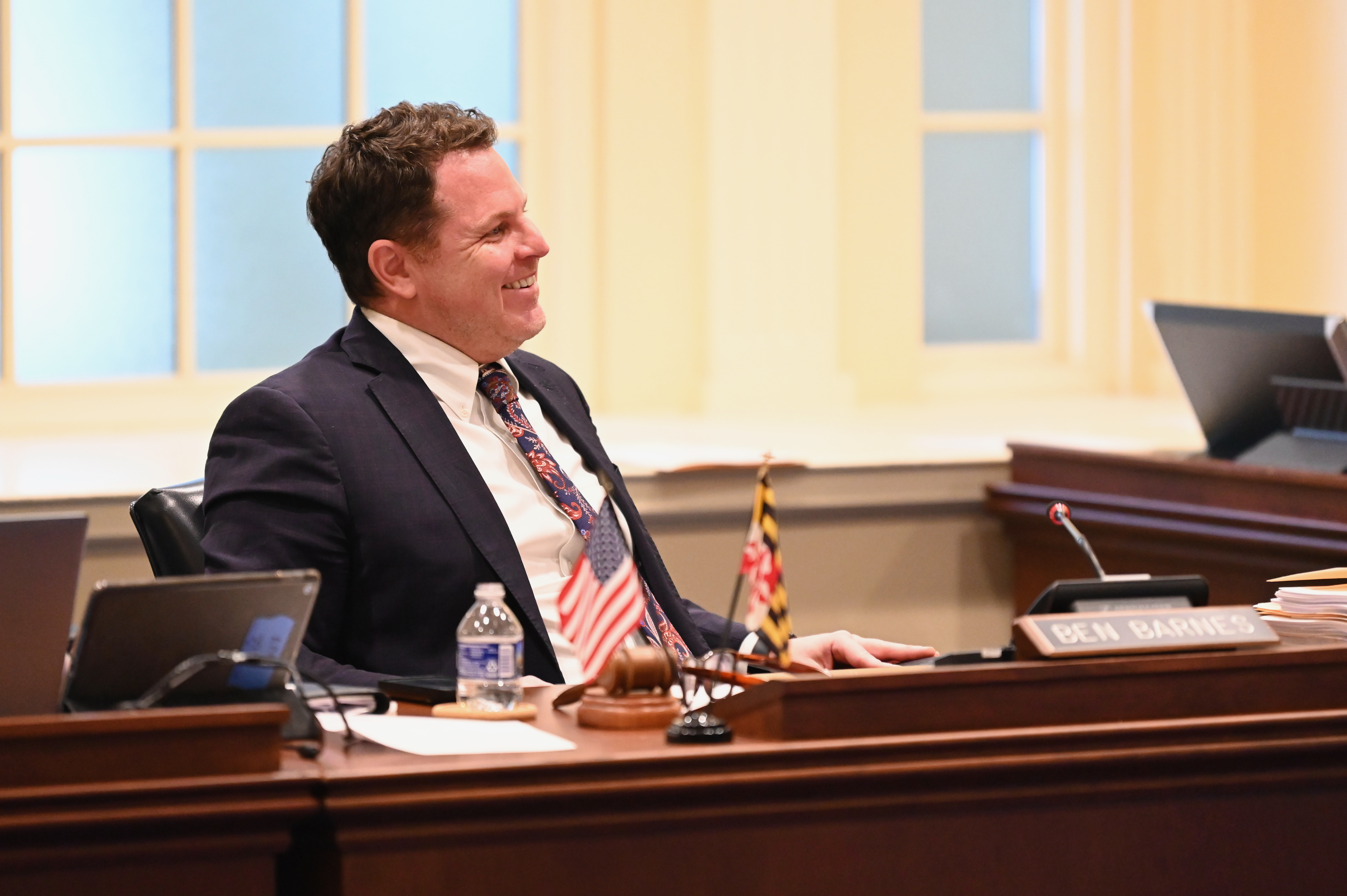
Barnes in the House Appropriations Committee, 2024

Barnes was sworn into the Maryland House of Delegates on January 10, 2007. He has served as the chief deputy majority whip since 2013, as the chair of the House Appropriations Committee since 2022, and as a member of the Spending Affordability Committee since 2020. He is also a member of the Anne Arundel County Delegation, the Prince George's County Delegation, and the Maryland Legislative Latino Caucus. Barnes was previously a member of the House Judiciary Committee from 2007 to 2011, and the Economic Matters Committee from 2011 to 2015.

During the 2008 Democratic Party presidential primaries, Barnes was elected and served as a pledged delegate for Hillary Clinton to the 2008 Democratic National Convention.

In December 2025, after Adrienne A. Jones announced that she would step down as Speaker of the Maryland House of Delegates, Barnes reportedly began making phone calls to his colleagues expressing interest about a run for speaker. Barnes dropped out of the race a few days later, endorsing Joseline Peña-Melnyk.

== Political positions ==
=== Development initiatives ===
During the 2023 legislative session, Barnes spearheaded a campaign to allow Prince George's County officials to appoint a member to the Maryland Stadium Authority.

=== Education ===
During the 2019 legislative session, Barnes introduced legislation that would expand the University System of Maryland Board of Regents to include the Maryland Secretary of Commerce, two members appointed by the president of the Maryland Senate and the Speaker of the Maryland House of Delegates, and a second student member. The bill passed both chambers unanimously and was signed into law by Governor Hogan on April 30, 2019.

In January 2020, during debate on the Blueprint for Maryland's Future, Barnes proposed an amendment to change how much funding the state would provide toward education funding in Baltimore and Prince George's County, resulting in an annual increase of $146.9 million and a $202.9 million respectively by 2030.

During the 2021 legislative session, Barnes supported a bill that would allow college athletes to profit off their name, image, and likeness.

During the 2025 legislative session, Barnes voted against reforms to the Blueprint for Maryland's Future proposed by Governor Wes Moore, which included funding delays for community schools and the implementation of collaborative time. He voted for an amended version of Moore's bill that reinstated funding for community schools and reduced the proposed delay in collaborative time.

=== Fiscal issues ===
During the 2013 legislative session, Barnes voted to pass legislation that would raise gas taxes to replenish the state's transportation fund.

Ahead of the 2024 legislative session, Barnes expressed interest in raising taxes or other revenues to address the state's general fund budget issues and $3 billion in proposed cuts to state transportation. That year, legislative officials, including Barnes, negotiated a compromise budget deal that raised vehicle registration fees to pay for state transportation projects.

During the 2025 legislative session, Barnes led negotiations on the budget for the House, which eventually led to a compromise deal that closed the state's $3.3 billion budget deficit by raising $1.6 billion in taxes and cuts about $2 billion in state spending. He criticized a Republican budget proposal to close the state's $3.3 billion budget deficit by cutting $1.6 billion in funding from Medicaid, freezing the Blueprint for Maryland's Future, and eliminating salary increases for state employees, comparing the proposal to similar proposals made by congressional Republicans and thanking Maryland Republicans for being "honest" that they want to cut Medicaid and education spending in state.

In October 2025, after federal officials said they would not continue funding the Supplemental Nutrition Assistance Program during the 2025 United States federal government shutdown, Barnes suggested that state officials use the Rainy Day fund to continue providing benefits to SNAP recipients.

In January 2026, Barnes said he supported providing tax incentives to Sphere Entertainment to build a Sphere concert venue in National Harbor, Maryland.

=== Gun control ===
During the 2013 legislative session, Barnes voted to pass legislation that would require fingerprinting of gun buyers, place new limits on firearm purchases by the mentally ill, and ban assault weapons and magazines that hold more than 10 bullets.

During the 2016 legislative session, Barnes introduced legislation to ban firearm possession on the campuses of public colleges and universities, with exceptions for police officers and security personnel. The bill passed the House of Delegates by a 89–49 vote on April 4, 2018.

=== Social issues ===
Barnes was the original House sponsor of the Civil Marriage Protection Act, arguing in 2011 that Maryland was discriminating against gay couples by not allowing them to marry. He voted in favor of the legislation when it was reintroduced in the 2012 legislative session as an Administration bill under Governor Martin O'Malley.

During the 2013 legislative session, Barnes voted to pass legislation that would repeal the death penalty in Maryland.

== Personal life ==
Barnes is married to Caitlin McDonough, a partner with the lobbyist law firm Harris Jones & Malone and daughter to former Maryland Secretary of State John McDonough. The couple has three sons and live in College Park, Maryland.

== Electoral history ==
Maryland House of Delegates District 21 Democratic primary election, 2006
| Party | Candidate | Votes | % |
|---|---|---|---|
| Democratic | Barbara A. Frush | 5,378 | 20.8 |
| Democratic | Joseline Peña-Melnyk | 5,255 | 20.3 |
| Democratic | Ben Barnes | 5,169 | 20.0 |
| Democratic | Brian R. Moe | 4,355 | 16.8 |
| Democratic | Tekisha Everette | 2,042 | 7.9 |
| Democratic | Mark Cook | 1,771 | 6.9 |
| Democratic | Michael B. Sarich | 1,346 | 5.2 |
| Democratic | Jon Black | 439 | 2.1 |

Maryland House of Delegates District 21 election, 2006
| Party | Candidate | Votes | % |
|---|---|---|---|
| Democratic | Ben Barnes | 18,453 | 29.6 |
| Democratic | Barbara A. Frush | 18,279 | 29.3 |
| Democratic | Joseline Peña-Melnyk | 18,001 | 28.9 |
| Republican | Neil B. Sood | 7,349 | 11.8 |
| Write-in | | 206 | 0.3 |

Maryland House of Delegates District 21 election, 2010
| Party | Candidate | Votes | % |
|---|---|---|---|
| Democratic | Ben Barnes | 18,954 | 25.2 |
| Democratic | Barbara A. Frush | 18,689 | 24.8 |
| Democratic | Joseline Peña-Melnyk | 18,457 | 24.5 |
| Republican | Scott W. Dibiasio | 6,131 | 8.1 |
| Republican | Jason W. Papanikolas | 6,013 | 8.0 |
| Republican | Kat Nelson | 5,822 | 7.7 |
| Libertarian | K. Bryan Walker | 1,151 | 1.5 |
| Write-in | | 72 | 0.1 |

Maryland House of Delegates District 21 election, 2014
| Party | Candidate | Votes | % |
|---|---|---|---|
| Democratic | Barbara A. Frush | 18,157 | 28.7 |
| Democratic | Ben Barnes | 17,235 | 27.3 |
| Democratic | Joseline Peña-Melnyk | 16,880 | 26.7 |
| Republican | Katherine M. Butcher | 10,610 | 16.8 |
| Write-in | | 284 | 0.4 |

Maryland House of Delegates District 21 election, 2018
| Party | Candidate | Votes | % |
|---|---|---|---|
| Democratic | Ben Barnes | 27,567 | 26.3 |
| Democratic | Joseline Peña-Melnyk | 26,889 | 25.7 |
| Democratic | Mary A. Lehman | 26,809 | 25.6 |
| Republican | Richard Douglas | 8,519 | 8.1 |
| Republican | Chike Anyanwu | 8,313 | 7.9 |
| Independent | Ray Ranker | 6,472 | 6.2 |
| Write-in | | 234 | 0.2 |

Maryland House of Delegates District 21 election, 2022
| Party | Candidate | Votes | % |
|---|---|---|---|
| Democratic | Mary A. Lehman | 22,333 | 33.63 |
| Democratic | Joseline Peña-Melnyk | 21,821 | 32.86 |
| Democratic | Ben Barnes | 21,531 | 32.42 |
| Write-in | | 720 | 1.08 |
