= 1919 Maryland Comptroller election =

- November 4, 1919
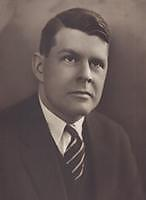

Nominee	E. Brooke Lee	Amos W. W. Woodcock
Party	Democratic	Republican
Popular vote	109,932	104,370
Percentage	49.79%	47.27%
- County results Lee: 40–50% 50–60% Woodcock: 50–60% 60–70%
Comptroller before election
Hugh A. McMullen
Democratic
Elected Comptroller
E. Brooke Lee
Democratic

The 1919 Maryland comptroller election was held on November 4, 1919, in order to elect the comptroller of Maryland. Democratic nominee E. Brooke Lee defeated Republican nominee Amos W. W. Woodcock, Socialist nominee John L. Weaver and Labor nominee Louis F. Guillotte.

== General election ==
On election day, November 4, 1919, Democratic nominee E. Brooke Lee won the election by a margin of 5,562 votes against his foremost opponent Republican nominee William O. Atwood, thereby retaining Democratic control over the office of comptroller. Lee was sworn in as the 25th comptroller of Maryland on January 3, 1920.

=== Results ===
Maryland Comptroller election, 1919
Party	Candidate	Votes	%
Democratic	E. Brooke Lee	109,932	49.79
Republican	Amos W. W. Woodcock	104,370	47.27
Socialist	John L. Weaver	3,450	1.56
Labor	Louis F. Guillotte	3,045	1.38
Total votes		220,797	100.00
Democratic hold			
