= John P. McDonough (politician) =

70th Secretary of State of Maryland

John McDonough
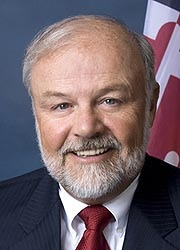

70th Secretary of State of Maryland
- In office July 18, 2008 – January 21, 2015
- Governor: Martin O'Malley
- Deputy: Rajan Natarajan; Peter Fosselman
- Preceded by: Dennis C. Schnepfe
- Succeeded by: John C. Wobensmith

Personal details
- Born: John P. McDonough; July 7, 1950 (age 76) Scranton, Pennsylvania, U.S.
- Party: Democratic
- Spouse: Mary Lou Gober McDonough
- Children: Emily, Caitlin, and Aisling
- Education: Johns Hopkins University; UM School of Law
- Profession: Lawyer

John P. McDonough (born July 7, 1950) is an American politician from Maryland. He served as Secretary of State of Maryland – a position appointed by the governor and confirmed by the state senate – from July 16, 2008 to January 21, 2015. The Secretary of State is one of the state's six constitutional officers, along with the Governor, Lt. Governor, Comptroller, Attorney General and Treasurer.

== Early life and education ==
McDonough was born in Scranton, Pennsylvania and moved to Prince George's County, Maryland in 1952. He graduated from Bladensburg High School in 1968, and Johns Hopkins University in 1972 with a degree in political science. McDonough received a Juris Doctor degree from the University of Maryland School of Law in 1977 and was admitted to the Maryland Bar that same year.

After serving as a legislative aide for the Prince George's County Council from 1970 to 1974, and the Chief of Staff for the Prince George's County Executive from 1974 to 1978, McDonough practiced law as an associate and partner in various firms from 1979 to 2005, including the firm of O'Malley, Miles, Nylen & Gilmore where he was a managing partner for ten years.

McDonough was a member of the Maryland Stadium Authority from 1986 to 1994. He served as vice chair of the Prince George's County Democratic Central Committee from 1998 to 2000 and served as its Counsel from 2000 to 2008.

== Secretary of State ==
Governor Martin O'Malley appointed McDonough as Secretary of State of Maryland on July 16, 2008. As Secretary of State, McDonough oversaw the registration of notaries and charitable organizations and served as the governor's liaison for labor relations. He served as the chair of the Governor's Subcabinet for International Affairs and was on the Board of State Canvassers. Secretary McDonough was active with the National Association of Secretaries of State, having served on the executive board, as co-chair of the International Relations Committee, and later as Chair of the Democratic Association of Secretaries of State.

== Personal life ==
McDonough married Mary Lou Gober in 1972 and the couple has three daughters, Emily, Caitlin and Aisling. The family has lived in Mitchellville, Maryland, since 1979. Mary Lou serves as Director of Corrections for Prince George's County, Maryland. Daughter Caitlin McDonough served as Legislative Director to Senate President Thomas V. "Mike" Miller Jr. from 2006 to 2012 and is married to Delegate Ben Barnes, who chairs the House Appropriations Committee.

Political offices
| Preceded by Dennis C. Schnepfe | Secretary of State of Maryland; 2008–2015 | Succeeded by John C. Wobensmith |
