= Philip Perlman =

American politician

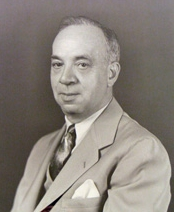

Solicitor General of the United States
- In office July 30, 1947 – August 15, 1952
- President: Harry Truman
- Preceded by: J. Howard McGrath
- Succeeded by: Walter J. Cummings Jr.

Secretary of State of Maryland
- In office 1920–1923
- Governor: Albert C. Ritchie
- Preceded by: George L. P. Radcliffe
- Succeeded by: E. Brooke Lee

Personal details
- Born: March 5, 1890 Baltimore, Maryland, U.S.
- Died: July 31, 1960 (aged 70) Washington, DC, U.S.

Philip B. Perlman (March 5, 1890, Baltimore – July 31, 1960) was a Baltimore native, the son of Benjamin and Rose Nathan Perlman. Graduating from Baltimore City College secondary school in 1908, Perlman worked as a reporter for the Baltimore American while studying political economy at Johns Hopkins University. He studied law at the University of Maryland School of Law, being admitted to the bar one year prior to receiving a law degree in 1912. He began working for The Evening Sun in 1910, first as a court reporter, and then as City Editor from 1913–1917. It was probably at this time that he got to know H. L. Mencken.

Leaving newspaper work in 1917, Perlman began many years of public service, interspersed with private law practice. Initially he worked under then Attorney General of Maryland, Albert C. Ritchie, as an assistant in the State Law Department, then became Assistant Maryland Attorney General in 1918. With Ritchie's election to the Maryland governorship in 1919, he appointed Perlman Secretary of State. Legislation drafted by Perlman included the bill providing for women's voting. In the 1920s, Perlman was City Solicitor of Baltimore and established a private law practice; in the 1930s he served on a commission to revise city zoning laws and on the first Maryland Water Resources Commission; in the 1940s he advised Governor William Preston Lane, Jr. on issues such as the Chesapeake Bay Bridge construction and highway improvement. In Perlman's private law practice, he was noted for civil rights cases.

Moving to the level of national politics, Perlman became the first Jewish U.S. Solicitor General, serving from 1947–1952 under President Harry S. Truman, where he chaired Truman's Commission on Immigration and Naturalization, and was noted for helping to write the 1948 and 1960 platforms for the Democratic National Convention. At the time of his death, Perlman maintained a law practice with the firm Perlman, Lyons and Emmerglick in Washington, D.C., was president of the board of trustees of the Walters Art Gallery in Baltimore, and a member of the Maryland Historical Society. He was also a member of the National Press Club and the Associated Jewish Charities. A bachelor, he had a home on Park Heights Avenue in Baltimore, and a suite at the Shoreham Hotel in Washington, D.C.

== See also ==
- List of Jewish American jurists

Political offices
Preceded by George L. P. Radcliffe	Secretary of State of Maryland; 1920—1923	Succeeded by E. Brooke Lee
Legal offices
Preceded by J. Howard McGrath	United States Solicitor General; 1947–1952	Succeeded by Walter J. Cummings, Jr.
