= Tyras S. Athey =

Secretary of State of Maryland (1927-2010)

Tyras Snowden "Bunk" Athey

Member of the Maryland House of Delegates from the 32nd district
- In office 1975–1993
- Preceded by: new district
- Succeeded by: Theodore J. Sophocleus
- Constituency: Anne Arundel County

Member of the Maryland House of Delegates from the 6a district
- In office 1967–1974

Maryland Secretary of State
- In office 1993–1995
- Governor: William Donald Schaefer
- Preceded by: Winfield M. Kelly Jr.
- Succeeded by: John T. Willis

Personal details
- Born: March 30, 1927 Burtonsville, Maryland, U.S.
- Died: July 20, 2010 (aged 83) Hospice of the Chesapeake, Annapolis, Maryland, U.S.
- Party: Democratic
- Spouse: (nee Dorothy "Chick" O' Lexey
- Children: Bryan, Cathleen, Darlene

Tyras Snowden "Bunk" Athey (March 30, 1927 – July 20, 2010) was an American politician from Maryland. Athey served in the Maryland House of Delegates 1967–1993 and Secretary of State of Maryland 1993–1995.

== Early life and education ==
Athey was the son of the late Joseph T. (Tax) and Harriett E. Athey. Athey's parents owned and operated a country grocery store, he was born and raised in Burtonsville, Maryland. His grandfather nicknamed him "Bunk" after a popular 1920s comic strip character. He attended Montgomery County public schools.

== Career ==
After graduating from Montgomery Blair High School in 1945, he enlisted in the United States Navy, serving in World War II as a corpsman aboard the USS Consolation, a hospital ship.

Athey served in the House of Delegates, initially representing district 6a from 1967 to 1974. After the 1974 redistricting, he represented the 32nd district in Anne Arundel County, from 1975 to 1993. He was chairman of the House Ways and Means committee for nearly 10 years, from 1983 to 1993. During this time, his committee passed legislation giving fiscal relief to the Maryland thoroughbred racing industry in the form of decreased handles and tax breaks.

== Notes ==
Political offices
Preceded by Winfield M. Kelly Jr.	Secretary of State of Maryland; 1993–1995	Succeeded by John T. Willis
