= Mary A. Lehman =

American politician (born 1964)

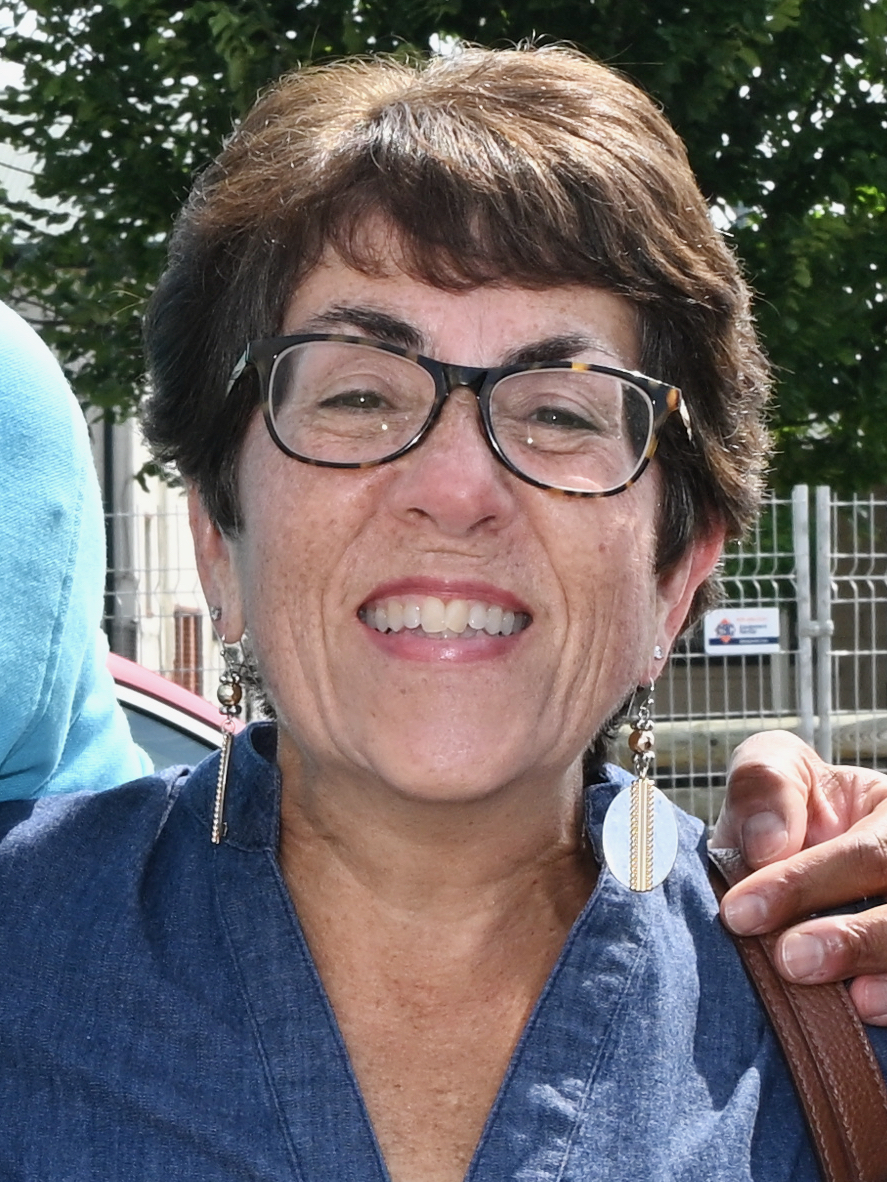

Member of the Maryland House of Delegates from the 21st district
- Incumbent
- Assumed office January 9, 2019 Serving with Joseline Peña-Melnyk (D) and Ben Barnes (D)
- Preceded by: Barbara A. Frush
- Constituency: Anne Arundel County, Prince George's County

Personal details
- Born: April 8, 1964 (age 62) Cheverly, Maryland, U.S.
- Party: Democratic
- Children: 4

Mary Angela Lehman (born April 8, 1964) is an American politician from the Democratic Party and is a current member of the Maryland House of Delegates representing District 21.

== Early life and career ==
Lehman was born in Cheverly, Maryland, on April 8, 1964. She grew up in Greenbelt, Maryland, and attended the University of Maryland, where in 1987 she received her Bachelor of Arts in English Literature and Bachelor of Science in Journalism.

From 1993 to 1994, Lehman worked as a spokesperson for Citizens Against the Stadium II, a group that protested the construction of the FedExField football stadium in Laurel, Maryland. After a vote on condemning the Commanders' proposed football stadium was tabled by the Prince George's County Council, she accused the football team of engaging in "the politics of intimidation" by threatening not to work with the city if the resolution passed. Team officials eventually announced that the stadium would be built in Landover after meeting with local residents.

In 2003, Lehman began working as an educational liaison to Prince George's County council member Tom Dernoga. In 2007, she began working for delegate Joseline Peña-Melnyk, who encouraged her to run for public office.

From 2010 to 2018, Lehman served on the Prince George's County Council, succeeding Tom Dernoga, who was term-limited. As a councilwoman, she oversaw the opening of the Prince George's Laurel Library Branch and lobbied for the library to have solar panels, pervious parking surfaces, electric car chargers, low flow toilets and sinks, and emergency lighting. She also had a role in saving the University of Maryland Laurel Medical Center from closure.

In February 2018, Lehman, who was term limited from running for another term on the Prince George's County Council, announced her candidacy for the Maryland House of Delegates in District 21. She came in third place in the 2018 Democratic primary, defeating primary opponent Matt Dernoga by only 222 votes.

== In the legislature ==
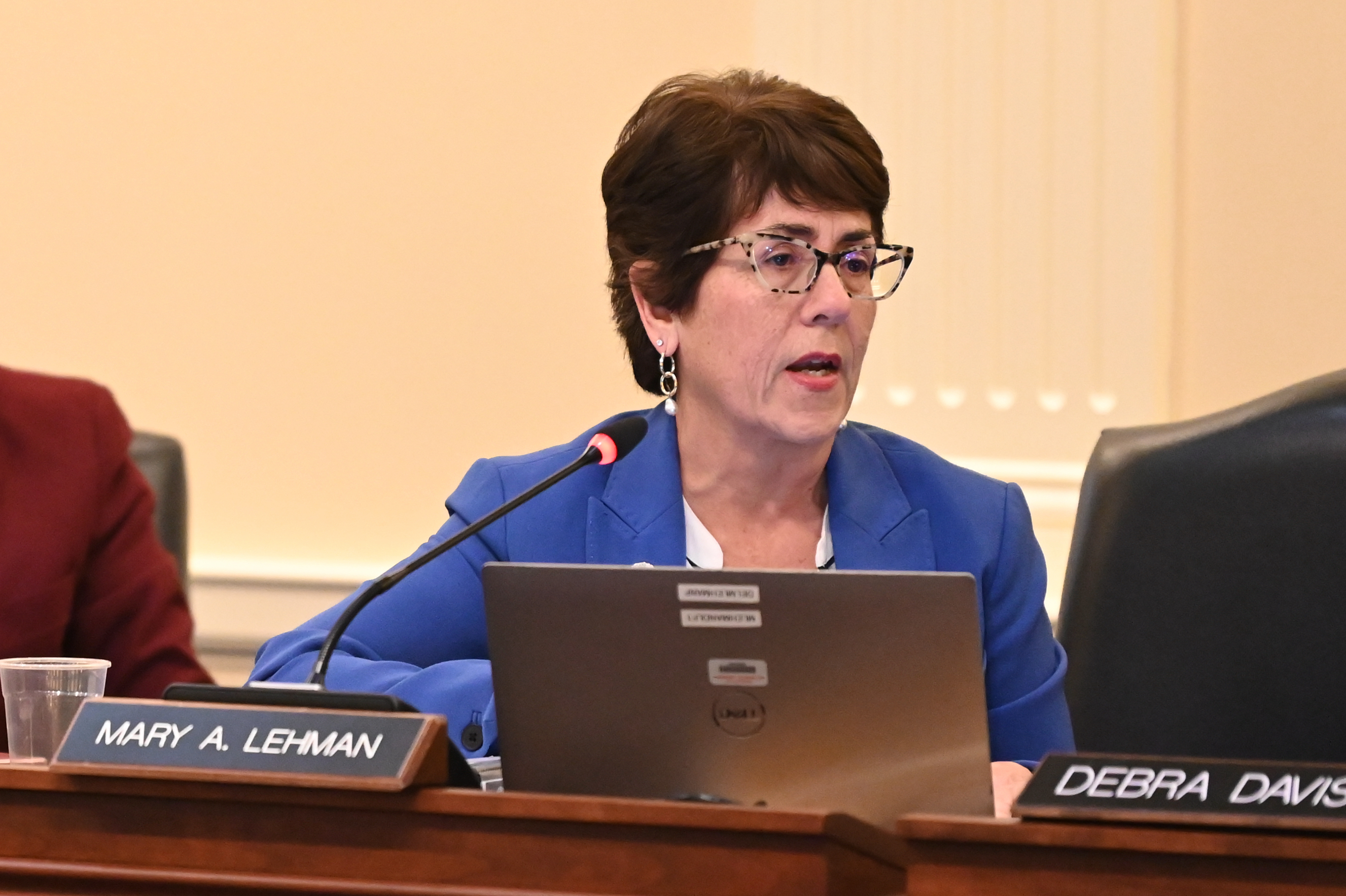
Lehman in the Environment and Transportation Committee, 2024

Lehman was sworn in as a member of the Maryland House of Delegates on January 9, 2019, and is a member of the Environment and Transportation Committee, the housing and real property subcommittee, and agriculture and open space subcommittee.

Lehman is a member of the Maryland Legislative Transit Caucus and the Women Legislators of Maryland, and is an associate member of the Maryland Legislative Latino Caucus.

In January 2020, Lehman filed to run as a convention delegate for Joe Biden at the 2020 Democratic National Convention.

== Political positions ==
=== Elections ===
In 2014, Lehman voted to approve an amendment to the county's charter that would give members of the county council another four-year term opposed to only two consecutive terms.

Lehman opposed legislation introduced by delegate Dereck E. Davis during the 2019 legislative session that would set up a public financing system for county campaigns in the 2026 election cycle, saying that the 2026 timeline was too far away. She also voted against legislation that would lift the ban on developer contributions in county political races.

=== Environment ===
In 2012, Lehman promoted legislation introduced by delegate Barbara Frush that would allow the Prince George's County council to require shoppers to pay for disposable bags. The bill was unexpectedly killed in the House Environmental Matters Committee, where it received a 12–11 vote to kill the bill.

Lehman introduced legislation in the 2019 legislative session that would have set strict standards for recycling crumb rubber-modified turf. She withdrew the bill later in the session, but planned to reintroduce it in the next legislative session.

Lehman received a score of 100 percent on the Maryland League of Conversation Voters' 2021 legislative scorecard.

=== Housing ===
Lehman introduced legislation in the 2022 legislative session that would require landlords to prove they are in compliance with local laws and state statutes when they file a failure to pay rent case.

=== Taxes ===
Lehman introduced legislation in the 2020 legislative session that would require corporate combined tax reporting. The bill passed the House of Delegates but did not receive a vote in the state senate. She also cosponsored legislation that would create a multi-state compact to end corporate tax breaks aimed at getting businesses to move across state lines.

=== Transportation ===
As a councilwoman, Lehman was vocally opposed to a proposed high-speed maglev train that would run from Washington, D.C., to Baltimore, citing concerns over the train's environmental impact, cost, and economic potential. In the 2018 legislative session, she filed legislation that would have provided state income and property tax credits to companies affected by the maglev's construction.

Lehman introduced legislation in the 2020 legislative session that would give local governments veto power over state-backed toll road projects. She said that she would oppose a repeal of existing laws that give Eastern Shore counties the right to block state-backed toll facilities.

== Personal life ==
Lehman is married and has four children. She attends religious services at the Resurrection Catholic Church in Burtonsville, Maryland.

== Electoral history ==
Prince George's County Councilman district 1 Democratic primary election, 2010
Party	Candidate	Votes	%
Democratic	Mary A. Lehman	3,065	41.6%
Democratic	Frederick Smalls	1,994	27.1%
Democratic	Valerie L. Cunningham	1,001	13.6%
Democratic	Sam Epps	865	11.7%
Democratic	Crystal R. Thompson	442	6.0%

Prince George's County Councilman district 1 general election, 2010
Party	Candidate	Votes	%
Democratic	Mary A. Lehman	19,703	99.2%
Other write-ins	Other write-ins	153	0.8%

Prince George's County Councilman district 1 Democratic primary election, 2014
Party	Candidate	Votes	%
Democratic	Mary A. Lehman	5,719	100%

Prince George's County Councilman district 1 general election, 2014
Party	Candidate	Votes	%
Democratic	Mary A. Lehman	18,466	99.0%
Other write-ins	Other write-ins	179	1.0%

Maryland House of Delegates district 21 Democratic primary election, 2018
Party	Candidate	Votes	%
Democratic	Joseline Peña-Melnyk	8,770	30.0%
Democratic	Ben Barnes	5,538	25.5%
Democratic	Mary A. Lehman	5,538	18.9%
Democratic	Matt Dernoga	5,316	18.2%
Democratic	Brencis Smith	1,169	4.0%
Democratic	James E. McDowell Jr.	1,027	3.5%

Maryland House of Delegates district 21 general election, 2018
Party	Candidate	Votes	%
Democratic	Ben Barnes	27,567	26.3%
Democratic	Joseline Peña-Melnyk	26,889	25.7%
Democratic	Mary A. Lehman	26,809	25.6%
Republican	Richard Douglas	8,519	8.1%
Republican	Chike Anyawu	8,313	7.9%
Unaffiliated	Ray Ranker	6,472	6.2%
Other write-ins	Other write-ins	234	0.2%
