= Secretary of State of Maryland =

Appointed state administrative official

- Incumbent; Michael Lore; Acting since November 6, 2026
- Type: Secretary of State
- Formation: 1838
- First holder: John Charles Groome

The secretary of state of Maryland is charged with the administrative and record-keeping functions of the state government of the U.S. state of Maryland. The secretary of state also holds custody of the Seal of Maryland. Unlike in many states, the secretary of state is not an elective office, but is appointed by the governor and confirmed by the state senate. Susan C. Lee has served as the secretary of state since January 2023.

== List of secretaries of state ==
| Name | Term | Image |
|---|---|---|
| John Charles Groome | 1838 | |
| John H. Culbreth | 1838 | |
| Joseph Hopper Nicholson II | 1838–1839 | |
| Cornelius McLean | 1839–1840 | |
| James Murray | 1840–1841 | |
| Thomas Wright, III | 1841–1842 | |
| Henry Hobbs | 1842 | |
| John Carroll LeGrand | 1842–1844 | |
| John N. Watkins | 1844 | |
| John N. Watkins | 1844–1845 | |
| William T. Wootton | 1845–1848 | |
| Richard C. Hollyday | 1848–1849 | |
| John N. Watkins | 1849–1851 | |
| Thomas H. O'Neal | 1851–1853 | |
| John Randolph Quinn | 1853–1854 | |
| Nathaniel Cox | 1854–1857 | |
| Jonathan Pinkney | 1857–1858 | |
| James R. Partridge | 1858–1861 | |
| Grayson Eichelberger | 1861 | |
| Thomas J. Wilson | 1861–1862 | |
| William B. Hill | 1862–1866 | |
| John M. Carter | 1866–1869 | |
| Richard C. Hollyday | 1869–1872 | |
| John Thomson Mason Jr. | 1872–1873 | |
| Richard C. Hollyday | 1873–1880 | |
| James T. Briscoe | 1880–1884 | |
| Richard C. Hollyday | 1884 | |
| George B. Milligan | 1884–1886 | |
| Edward W. LeCompte | 1886–1893 | |
| William T. Brantly | 1893–1894 | |
| Edwin Gott | 1894–1896 | |
| Richard Dallam | 1896–1899 | |
| George E. Loweree | 1899–1900 | |
| Wilfred Bateman | 1900–1904 | |
| Oswald Tilghman | 1904–1908 | |
| N. Winslow Williams | 1908–1912 | |
| Robert P. Graham | 1912–1916 | |
| Thomas W. Simmons | 1916–1919 | |
| George L. P. Radcliffe | 1919–1920 | |
| Philip B. Perlman | 1920–1923 | |
| E. Brooke Lee | 1923–1925 | |
| David C. Winebrenner III | 1925–1935 | |
| Thomas L. Dawson | 1935–1936 | |
| E. Ray Jones | 1936–1939 | |
| John B. Gontrum | 1939 | |
| Francis Petrott | 1939–1941 | |
| Miles T. Tull | 1941 | |
| Thomas Elmo Jones | 1941–1946 | |
| William J. McWilliams | 1946 | |
| Edward G. Chaney | 1946–1947 | |
| John B. Funk | 1947 | |
| Bertram Lee Boone II | 1947–1949 | |
| Vivian V. Simpson | 1949–1951 | |
| John R. Reeves | 1951–1955 | |
| Blanchard Randall | 1955–1957 | |
| Claude B. Hellmann | 1957–1959 | |
| Thomas B. Finan | 1959–1961 | |
| Lloyd Lewis Simpkins | 1961–1967 | |
| C. Stanley Blair | 1967–1969 | |
| Blair Lee III | 1969–1971 | |
| Fred L. Wineland | 1971–1982 | |
| Patricia G. Holtz | 1982–1983 | |
| Lorraine Sheehan | 1983–1987 | |
| Winfield M. Kelly Jr. | 1987–1993 | |
| Tyras S. Athey | 1993–1995 | |
| John T. Willis | 1995–2003 | |
| R. Karl Aumann | 2003–2005 | |
| Mary D. Kane | 2005–2007 | |
| Dennis C. Schnepfe | 2007–2008 | |
| John P. McDonough | 2008–2015 | |
| John C. Wobensmith | 2015–2023 | |
| Susan C. Lee | 2023–2026 | |
| Michael Lore (acting) | 2026–present | |
