= John C. Wobensmith =

71st Secretary of State of Maryland

John Wobensmith

71st Secretary of State of Maryland
- In office January 21, 2015 – January 18, 2023; Acting: January 21, 2015 – February 13, 2015
- Governor: Larry Hogan
- Preceded by: John P. McDonough
- Succeeded by: Susan C. Lee

Personal details
- Party: Republican
- Children: 2
- Education: University of Pennsylvania (BA)

Military service
- Branch/service: United States Navy

John C. Wobensmith is an American politician who served as the 71st secretary of state of Maryland from 2015 to 2023.

== Education ==
Wobensmith earned a Bachelor of Arts degree in English from the University of Pennsylvania and graduated from the National War College.

== Career ==
Wobensmith served in the United States Navy and worked for five decades in national security under U.S. presidents Richard Nixon, Gerald Ford, Ronald Reagan, George H. W. Bush, and Bill Clinton. He also served as the senior United States Department of Defense representative in Turkey.

Wobensmith served on the Anne Arundel County Board of Education for nine years and after retirement from federal civilian employment, was vice president for International Marketing for Sensys Technologies in London. He also worked for the American Foreign Policy Council.

Wobensmith served as the treasurer for the 2014 Hogan–Rutherford gubernatorial election campaign and was a member of Hogan's transition team.

=== Maryland secretary of state ===
Governor-elect Larry Hogan announced the appointment of Wobensmith as secretary of state of Maryland on December 30, 2014. As secretary of state, Wobensmith oversaw the registration of notaries and charitable organizations and served as the governor's liaison for labor relations. He served as the chair of the Governor's Subcabinet for International Affairs and was on the Board of State Canvassers.

Political offices
Preceded by John P. McDonough	Secretary of State of Maryland; 2015–2023	Succeeded by Susan C. Lee
