= Maryland Legislative District 21 =

American legislative district

Maryland's legislative district 21
- Represents parts of Anne Arundel County and Prince George's County
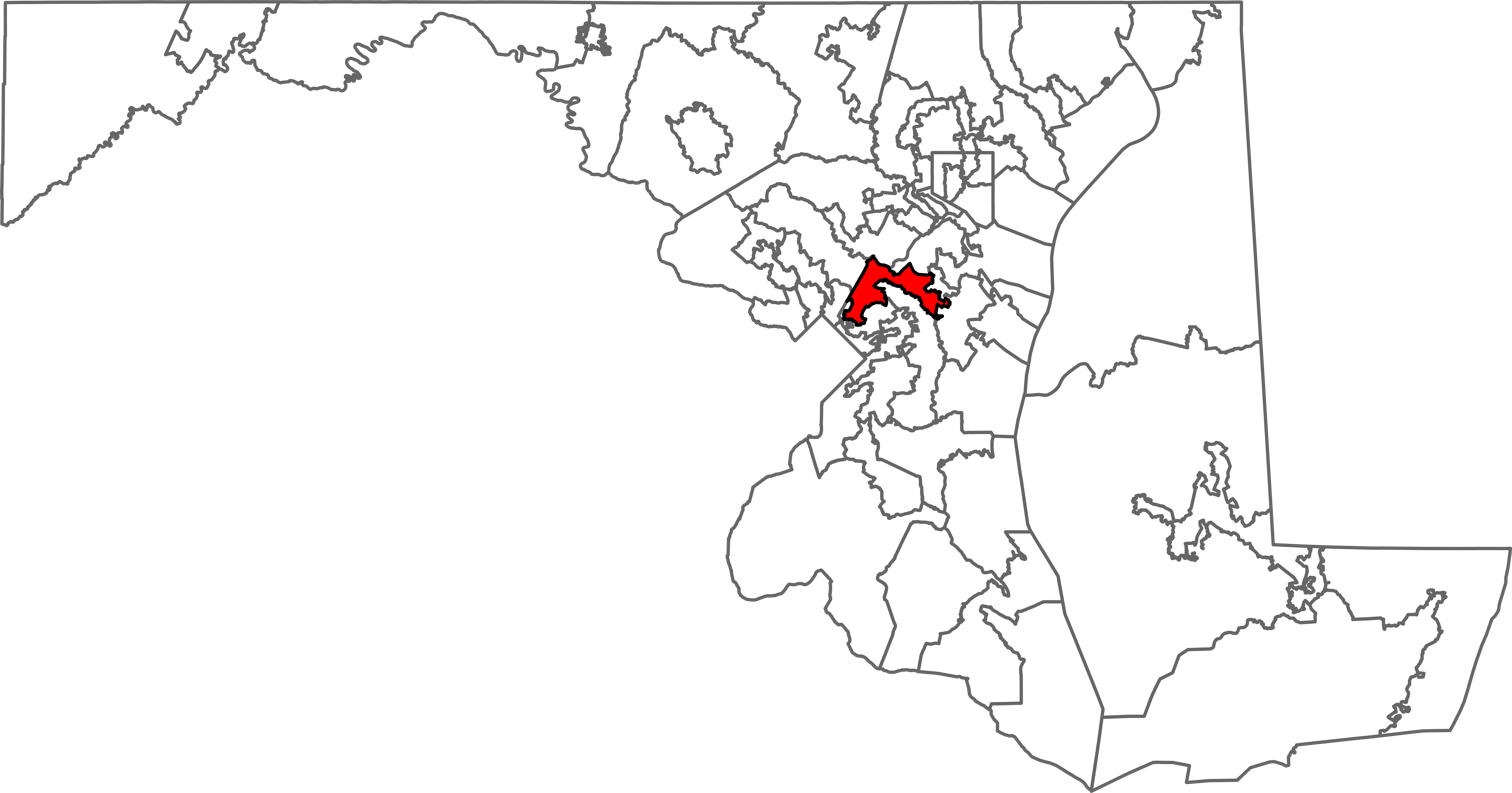
- Senator: James Rosapepe (D)
- Delegate(s): Ben Barnes (D); Mary A. Lehman (D); Joseline Peña-Melnyk (D)
- Registration: 60.8% Democratic; 16.3% Republican; 20.3% unaffiliated
- Demographics: 35.6% White; 29.7% Black/African American; 0.8% Native American; 10.5% Asian; 0.0% Hawaiian/Pacific Islander; 13.4% Other race; 9.9% Two or more races; 21.9% Hispanic
- Population (2020): 147,240
- Voting-age population: 119,320
- Registered voters: 81,968

Maryland Legislative District 21 is one of 47 districts in the state for the Maryland General Assembly. It covers parts of Anne Arundel County and Prince George's County. The district is represented by three delegates in the Maryland House of Delegates.

== Demographic characteristics ==
As of the 2020 United States census, the district had a population of 147,240, of whom 119,320 (81.0%) were of voting age. The racial makeup of the district was 52,417 (35.6%) White, 43,710 (29.7%) African American, 1,240 (0.8%) Native American, 15,501 (10.5%) Asian, 52 (0.0%) Pacific Islander, 19,720 (13.4%) from some other race, and 14,551 (9.9%) from two or more races. Hispanic or Latino of any race were 32,265 (21.9%) of the population.

The district had 81,968 registered voters as of October 17, 2020, of whom 16,615 (20.3%) were registered as unaffiliated, 13,362 (16.3%) were registered as Republicans, 49,831 (60.8%) were registered as Democrats, and 1,663 (2.0%) were registered to other parties.

== Political representation ==
The district is represented for the 2023–2027 legislative term in the State Senate by James Rosapepe (D) and in the House of Delegates by Ben Barnes (D), Mary A. Lehman (D) and Joseline Peña-Melnyk (D).

== Election history ==
Years	Senator	Party	Electoral history
January 8, 1975 – January 8, 2003	Arthur Dorman	Democratic	Elected in 1974. Re-elected in 1978. Re-elected in 1982. Re-elected in 1986. Re-elected in 1990. Re-elected in 1994. Re-elected in 1998. Lost renomination.
January 8, 2003 – January 10, 2007	John A. Giannetti Jr.	Democratic	Elected in 2002. Lost renomination.
January 10, 2007 – present	James Rosapepe	Democratic	Elected in 2006. Re-elected in 2010. Re-elected in 2014. Re-elected in 2018. Re-elected in 2022. Re-elected in 2026.
