= Walter J. Cummings Jr. =

American judge (1916–1999)

Walter Cummings
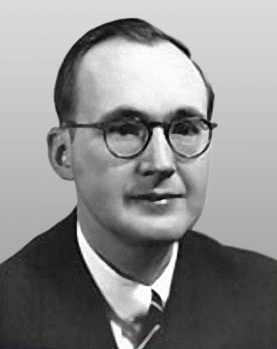

Chief Judge of the United States Court of Appeals for the Seventh Circuit
- In office 1981–1986
- Preceded by: Thomas E. Fairchild
- Succeeded by: William J. Bauer

Judge of the United States Court of Appeals for the Seventh Circuit
- In office August 11, 1966 – April 24, 1999
- Appointed by: Lyndon B. Johnson
- Preceded by: Seat created
- Succeeded by: Ann Claire Williams

United States Solicitor General
- In office December 2, 1952 – March 1, 1953
- President: Harry S. Truman
- Preceded by: Philip Perlman
- Succeeded by: Simon Sobeloff

Personal details
- Born: Walter Joseph Cummings Jr. September 29, 1916 Chicago, Illinois, U.S.
- Died: April 24, 1999 (aged 82) Chicago, Illinois, U.S.
- Party: Democratic
- Education: Yale University (BA); Harvard University (LLB)

Walter Joseph Cummings Jr. (September 29, 1916 – April 24, 1999) was a United States Solicitor General and a United States circuit judge of the United States Court of Appeals for the Seventh Circuit.

== Education and career ==
Born September 29, 1916, in Chicago, Illinois, Cummings received a Bachelor of Arts degree in 1937 from Yale University and a Bachelor of Laws in 1940 from Harvard Law School. At Yale, he served on the business staff of campus humor magazine The Yale Record with Roy D. Chapin Jr. and James S. Copley. He served as Assistant Solicitor General and Special Assistant Attorney General at the United States Department of Justice from 1940 to 1946. He was in private practice in Chicago from 1946 to 1966. He served as United States Solicitor General from 1952 to 1953.

=== Solicitor General service ===
In 1946, Cummings joined the Chicago law firm now known as Sidley Austin as a partner. He remained at the firm until 1966, taking his only leave of absence to become Solicitor General of the United States after President Truman’s December 1, 1952 appointment. At age 36, Cummings was the youngest Solicitor general to serve in the position. His short Solicitor General service (from December 1952–March 1953) was during the transitional period between the presidencies of Harry S. Truman and Dwight D. Eisenhower. Cummings only appeared before the Supreme Court in matters concerning alleged violations of the civil rights of convicts in a Florida prison camp and a question concerning the constitutionality of the emergency strike section of the Taft-Hartley Act.

== Federal judicial service ==
Cummings was nominated by President Lyndon B. Johnson on July 11, 1966, to the United States Court of Appeals for the Seventh Circuit, to a new seat authorized by 80 Stat. 75. He was confirmed by the United States Senate on August 10, 1966, and received his commission on August 11, 1966. He served as Chief Judge and as a member of the Judicial Conference of the United States from 1981 to 1986. His service terminated on April 24, 1999, due to his death in Chicago. He was the last federal appeals court judge in active service to have been appointed to his position by President Johnson. (Note: Harry Pregerson, appointed by Johnson to the Central District of California, would be appointed by Jimmy Carter to the Ninth Circuit and remain in active service as late as 2015.)

== Notable cases ==
In Sprogis v. United Airlines (1971), Cummings ruled that United Airlines's requirement that female employees be unmarried but allowing male employees to be married constitutes sex discrimination and violates Title VII of the Civil Rights Act.

In 1979, Cummings ruled in Carroll v. Talman Federal Savings And Loan Association of Chicago that requiring female employees to wear uniforms while allowing male employees to wear suits of their choice constitutes sex discrimination. Cummings cited his earlier ruling in Sprogis for his ruling in Carroll.

== See also ==
- List of United States federal judges by longevity of service

== Sources ==
Legal offices
Preceded by Philip B. Perlman	United States Solicitor General; 1952–1953	Succeeded by Simon Sobeloff
New seat	Judge of the United States Court of Appeals for the Seventh Circuit; 1966–1999	Succeeded by Ann Claire Williams
Preceded by Thomas E. Fairchild	Chief Judge of the United States Court of Appeals for the Seventh Circuit; 1981–1986	Succeeded by William J. Bauer
