= John T. Willis (politician) =

American politician (born 1946)

66th Secretary of State of Maryland
- In office 1995–2003
- Governor: Parris Glendening
- Preceded by: Tyras S. Athey
- Succeeded by: R. Karl Aumann

Personal details
- Born: November 1, 1946 (age 79) Baltimore, Maryland
- Party: Democratic

John T. Willis (born November 1, 1946) is an American politician and college instructor. He served as the Secretary of State of Maryland in the administration of Parris Glendening from 1995 to 2003.

== Early life and education ==
Born in Baltimore, Willis grew up in Westminster, Maryland, attending Westminster High School. He graduated from the Bucknell University (BA) and Harvard Law School (JD).

After his political career, he taught courses at McDaniel College and the University of Baltimore.

Political offices
Preceded by Tyras S. Athey	Secretary of State of Maryland; 1995–2003	Succeeded by R. Karl Aumann
