= Vivian V. Simpson =

American lawyer

Secretary of State of Maryland
- In office 1949–1951
- Governor: William Preston Lane Jr.
- Preceded by: Bertram Lee Boone II
- Succeeded by: John R. Reeves

Personal details
- Born: 1903
- Died: 1987 (aged 83–84)

Vivian V. Simpson (1903 – 1987) was an American lawyer. She was the first female lawyer in Montgomery County, the first woman elected president of the Montgomery County Bar Association, and the first female Secretary of State of Maryland.

== Biography ==
Simpson was born in 1903 in Washington, D.C., and grew up in Takoma Park, Maryland, where she would graduate from the high school. She studied teaching at the University of Maryland, but soon became involved in a scandal over misconduct by school faculty. In the ensuing trouble, the university blocked Simpson's reentry, and she subsequently sued. The Maryland Court of Appeals, decided the case Woods V. Simpson against Simpson, and she subsequently transferred to George Washington University, where she would obtain a B.A. in 1925. She later graduated with honors from the George Washington University Law School after two years. After graduation, she opened a solo law practice in Rockville, Maryland, becoming the first woman to practice law in Montgomery County.

In 1938, Simpson became a member of the Board of County Commissioners in Montgomery, Maryland, and became the first woman attorney there. Herbert O'Conor appointed her to the State Industrial Accident Commission of Maryland, the first woman to serve on the commission. In 1949, she was both the first woman elected president of the Montgomery County Bar Association, and became the first woman to be appointed Secretary of State of Maryland. After a year however, she resigned, saying "I don't like to be at other people's beck and call, I'm too independent for that".

The Distinguished Alumni Achievement Award from George Washington University was given to her in 1950. Nine years later, Simpson was the vice-president of the Maryland State Bar Association, and later on the Judicial Appointments Committee. George Washington University also gave her a Professional Achievement Award in 1959. She retired in 1980, and died in August 1987. The Maryland Bar Association posthumously named her one of the twenty "Lawyers of the Century" in Montgomery County.

Political offices
Preceded by Bertram Lee Boone II	Secretary of State of Maryland; 1949–1951	Succeeded by John R. Reeves
