= Susan Lee (politician) =

American politician

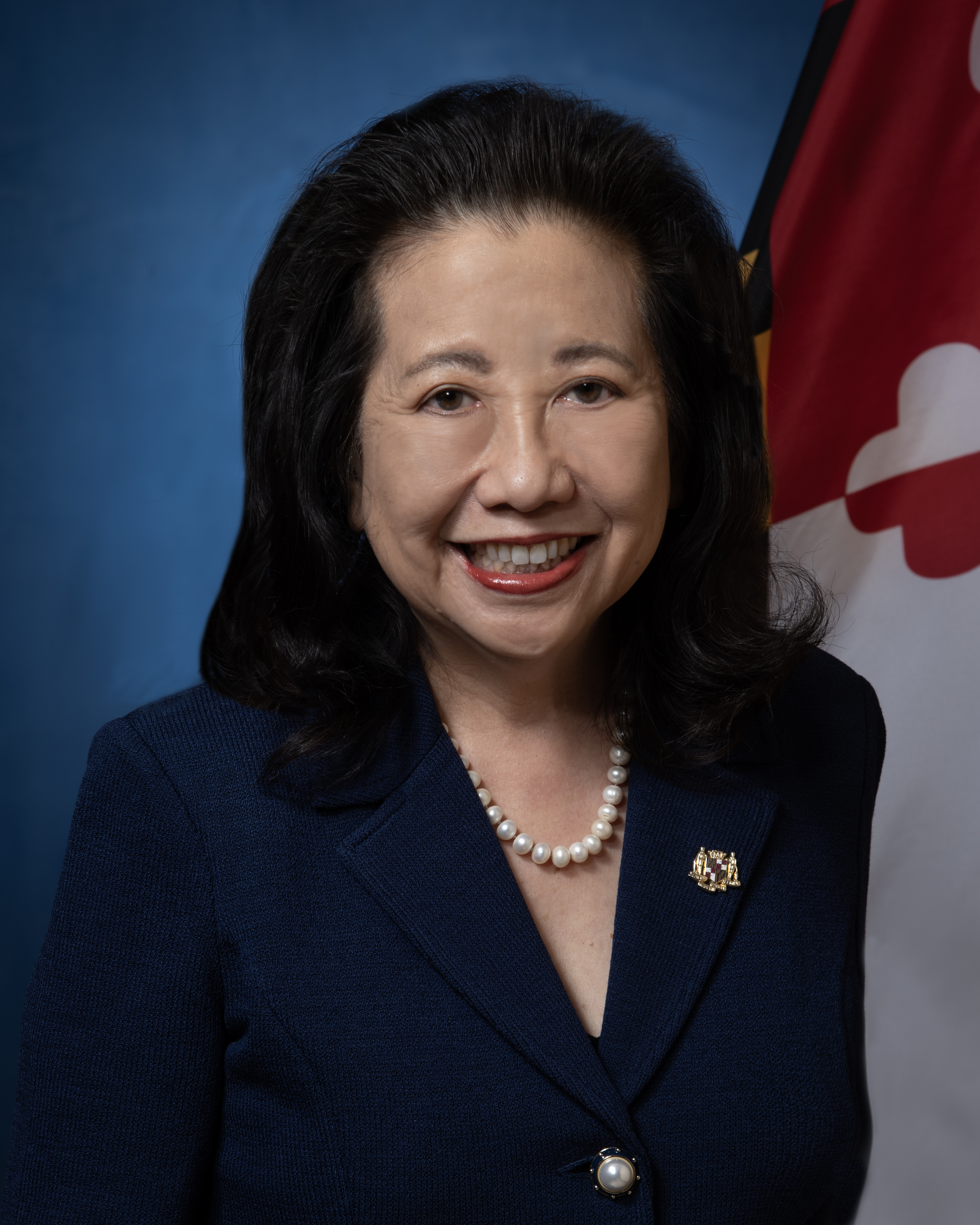

72nd Secretary of State of Maryland
- In office January 18, 2023 – November 6, 2026; Acting: January 18, 2023 – February 13, 2023
- Governor: Wes Moore
- Preceded by: John C. Wobensmith
- Succeeded by: Michael Lore (acting)

Member of the Maryland Senate from the 16th district
- In office January 14, 2015 – January 18, 2023
- Preceded by: Brian Frosh
- Succeeded by: Ariana Kelly

Member of the Maryland House of Delegates from the 16th district
- In office February 21, 2002 – January 13, 2015 Serving with: Marilyn R. Goldwater (2002–2007); William A. Bronrott (2002–2010); William Frick (2007–2015); Ariana Kelly (2011–2015)
- Preceded by: Nancy Kopp
- Succeeded by: Marc Korman

Personal details
- Born: May 14, 1954 (age 72) San Antonio, Texas, U.S.
- Party: Democratic
- Education: University of Maryland, College Park (BA); University of San Francisco (JD)
- Susan Lee's voice Susan C. Lee on the responsibilities of the Maryland Secretary of State; Recorded February 10, 2023

Susan Clair Lee (Chinese: 李鳳遷; pinyin: Lǐ Fèngqiān; born May 14, 1954) is an American politician who served as the 72nd Maryland Secretary of State from 2023 from 2026. A member of the Democratic Party, she was a member of the Maryland State Senate from 2015 to 2023, and of the Maryland House of Delegates from 2002 to 2015. She represented District 16, covering parts of Montgomery County, and was the first Asian American elected to the Maryland State Senate, as well as the first Asian American woman and first Chinese American elected to the Maryland legislature.

== Early life and education ==
Lee was born in San Antonio, Texas. She grew up in Montgomery County and attended Winston Churchill High School. She earned a Bachelor of Arts degree from the University of Maryland College Park before graduating from the University of San Francisco School of Law. She is a member of the District of Columbia Bar and the California State Bar. Before becoming a state legislator, Lee was an attorney in private practice, having previously worked as an attorney for the United States Commission on Civil Rights and the United States Patent and Trademark Office. She was also co-chairwoman of the Montgomery County NAACP Multicultural Community Partnership.

== Maryland legislature ==
On February 19, 2002, Governor Parris Glendening appointed Lee to the Maryland House of Delegates following the election of Nancy Kopp as Treasurer of Maryland. This appointment came after a recommendation by the Montgomery County Democratic Central Committee, on which she sat. She was sworn in on February 21 and was subsequently elected to her first full term in 2002. She was re-elected in 2006 and 2010.

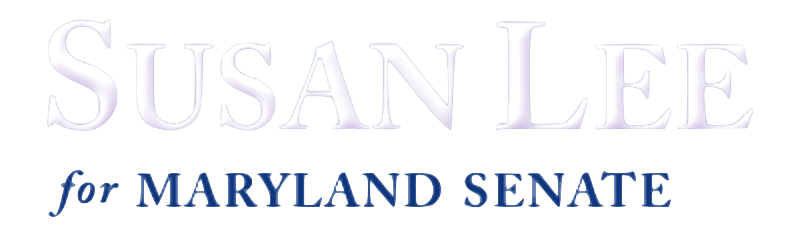
Lee's 2014 State Senate campaign logo

In August 2013, Lee announced that she would run for the Maryland Senate, seeking to succeed state senator Brian Frosh, who ran for Attorney General of Maryland in 2014. She won the Democratic primary with 85.1 percent of the vote, and later won the general election with 70 percent of the vote. Lee was sworn into the Maryland Senate on January 14, 2015. Since November 2018, she has served as the Senate majority whip.

=== Committee assignments ===
Maryland House of Delegates

- Member, Judiciary Committee, 2002–2015 (member, gaming law & enforcement subcommittee, 2002–2003; civil law & procedure subcommittee, 2003–2006; chair, juvenile law subcommittee, 2007–2011; chair, family law subcommittee, 2011–2015)
- Deputy Majority Whip, 2003–2015
- Member, Joint Committee on Access to Mental Health Services, 2011–2014

Maryland Senate

- Majority Whip, 2019–2023
- Deputy Majority Whip, 2017–2018
- Member, Judicial Proceedings Committee, 2015–2023
- Joint Committee on Cybersecurity, Information Technology, and Biotechnology, 2015–2023
- Executive Nominations Committee, 2019–2023
- Legislative Policy Committee, 2020–2023

== Maryland Secretary of State ==
On January 10, 2023, Governor-elect Wes Moore named Lee to serve as the Maryland Secretary of State. She took office in an acting position on January 18, the same day that Moore was sworn in as Governor, and is the first Asian American person to serve as the Maryland Secretary of State. On February 14, the Maryland Senate unanimously approved Lee's nomination.

In September 2023, Lee said that her office would consider removing former President Donald Trump from the primary election ballot under the Fourteenth Amendment. She ultimately decided against excluding Trump. Lee was an at-large delegate to the 2024 Democratic National Convention, pledged to Kamala Harris.

Lee resigned as Maryland Secretary of State on November 6, 2026, afterwards telling Bethesda Magazine that she resigned because she had to care for her husband, who had serious health issues.

== Political positions ==
=== COVID-19 pandemic ===
Between late May and June 2020, Lee virtually met four times with representatives from the Maryland Department of Public Safety and Correctional Services, the Maryland Department of Juvenile Services, and the Maryland Judiciary. These meetings resulted in the Senate Judicial Proceedings Committee releasing a report with 19 recommendations to help the state's correctional systems navigate the COVID-19 pandemic.

In March 2021, Lee rebuked disparaging statements made by former president Donald Trump regarding the COVID-19 pandemic, in which phrases like "Kung Flu" and the "China virus" stoked racism toward Asian communities. Later that month, after CNN aired a clip showing senior Hogan health advisor and then-Centers for Disease Control and Prevention director Robert R. Redfield saying he believed the COVID-19 virus "escaped" from a lab in China in September or October 2019, Lee took to the floor of the Maryland Senate to condemn Redfield's comments and suggested that Asian-Americans could be targeted because of his remarks.

=== Crime and policing ===
During the 2020 legislative session, Lee introduced a bill that would require prosecutors to disclose whether facial recognition or DNA profiling were used during the criminal investigation of a case. The bill was withdrawn after its first hearing. She also introduced a bill that would make it a crime to possess ransomware with the intent to use it, with sentences up to 10 years in prison and or a $10,000 fine, following a ransomware attack that froze government computers in Baltimore.

During the 2021 legislative session, Lee introduced a bill that would repeal the prohibition on prosecuting sexual crimes against a victim who is the spouse of the assailant. The bill unanimously passed out of the Maryland Senate and passed the Maryland House of Delegates by a vote of 115-18.

=== Development initiatives ===
In January 2020, Lee criticized the proposed Capital Beltway and Interstate 270 expansions, telling The Washington Post, "So far the state's top-down kind of planning [on the toll lanes] has disregarded any dialogue about some of the financial risks, the risk to our environment, the risk to our communities, and to our businesses and to our quality of life". She also introduced a bill that would give counties the ability to block state toll projects.

=== Gun control ===
During the 2019 legislative session, Lee introduced a bill that would ban privately made firearms in Maryland. The bill was reintroduced during the 2022 legislative session, during which it passed the House of Delegates and the state Senate, and became law without Governor Hogan's signature. Following the bill's passage, she was invited to the White House by U.S. President Joe Biden, where he announced a new United States Department of Justice rule regulating privately made firearms.

During the 2020 legislative session, Lee introduced a bill that would require background checks for private sales of long guns. The bill passed the Maryland Senate by a vote of 31-14 and the Maryland House of Delegates by a vote of 87-47, but was vetoed by Governor Hogan on May 7, 2020. The Maryland General Assembly voted to override the governor's veto on February 9, 2021.

=== Immigration ===
In June 2018, following national outcry about the Trump administration's family separation policy, Lee called on Maryland counties to "stop taking blood money from ICE" to detain immigrants. At the time, only three counties (Frederick, Howard, and Worcester counties) had facilities for detaining immigrants that were used by ICE.

=== National politics ===
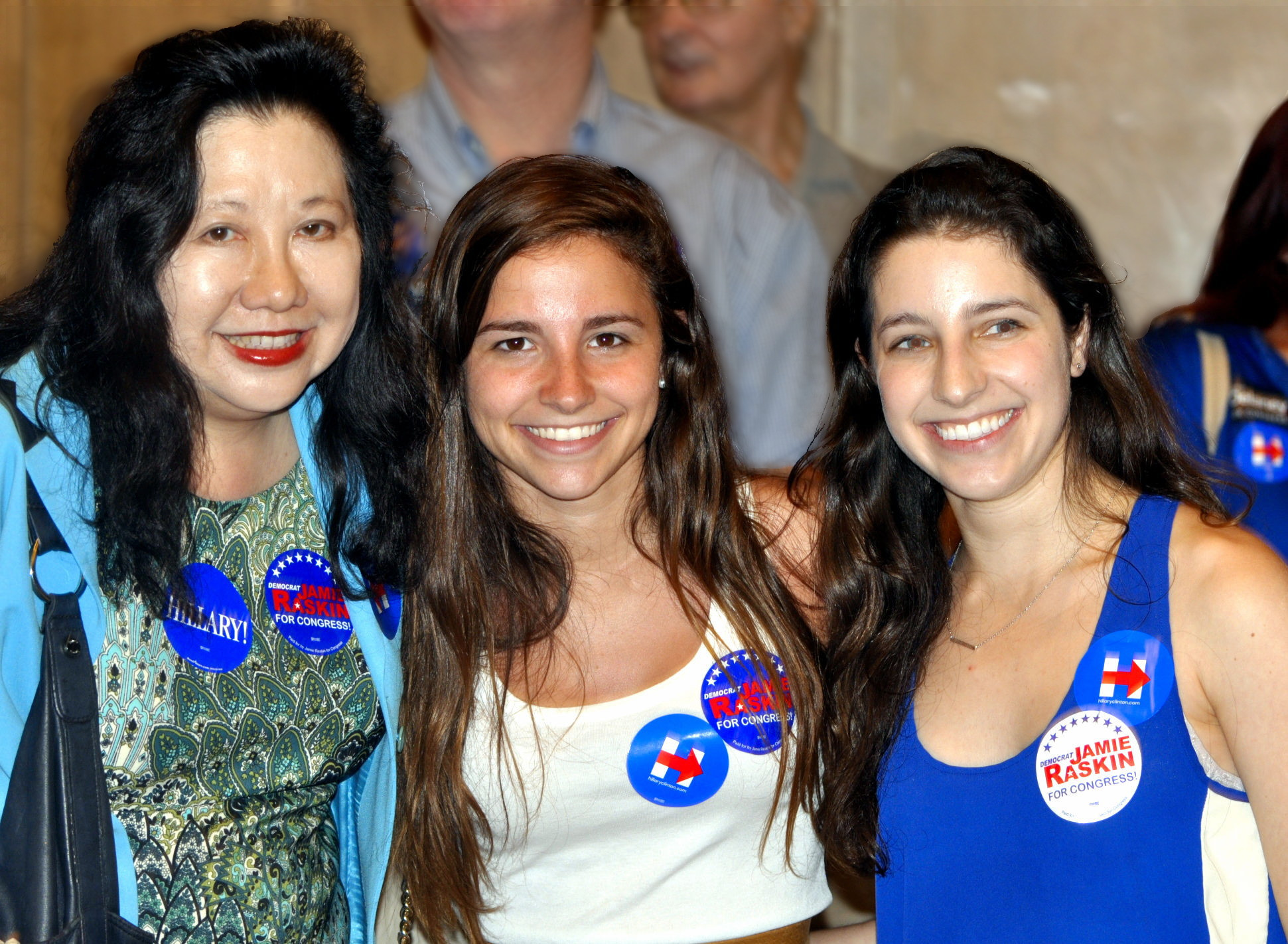
Lee (left) at a Hillary Clinton campaign event, 2016

In April 2015, Lee endorsed U.S. Representative Chris Van Hollen in the 2016 United States Senate election in Maryland. In November, she endorsed former Secretary of State Hillary Clinton for president.

=== Social issues ===
In February 2004, Lee criticized a bill that would have defined marriages in Maryland as the union of a man and woman, saying before a House Judiciary Committee hearing, "These bills are inflammatory, they are divisive and they promote intolerance to a large portion of our population". In February 2006, Lee voted against a bill that would amend the Maryland Constitution to ban same-sex marriage in the state. The bill failed to pass by a vote of 61-78. In 2012, she voted for the Civil Marriage Protection Act, which passed out of the Maryland House of Delegates by a vote of 72-67.

During the 2020 legislative session, Lee introduced a bill that would codify the right to abortion access. The bill was withdrawn in the final week of the legislative session, which was shortened by the COVID-19 pandemic.

During the 2021 legislative session, Lee introduced a bill that would have granted adoptees above the age of 18 access to their original birth certificates. The bill failed to pass out of the state Senate by a vote of 16-31. She also introduced a bill that would have required family law judges to undergo a minimum of 60 hours of training on child abuse investigations, implicit bias in custody decisions, parental alienation, and qualifications for child abuse evaluators and treatment providers.

=== Taxes ===
In November 2007, Lee voted in favor of House Bill 2, which raised individual and corporate income tax provisions, and House Bill 5, which increased the state sales tax, car titling tax, and hotel tax.

== Electoral history ==
Maryland House of Delegates District 16 Democratic primary election, 2002
Party	Candidate	Votes	%
Democratic	Marilyn R. Goldwater (incumbent)	14,197	30.5
Democratic	Susan C. Lee	12,710	27.3
Democratic	William A. Bronrott (incumbent)	12,681	27.3
Democratic	Charles Chester	4,990	10.7
Democratic	Karen Kuker-Kihl	1,903	4.1

Maryland House of Delegates District 16 election, 2002
Party	Candidate	Votes	%
Democratic	Marilyn R. Goldwater (incumbent)	31,440	25.5
Democratic	Susan C. Lee	30,201	24.5
Democratic	William A. Bronrott (incumbent)	30,069	24.4
Republican	Charles Stansfield	13,574	11.0
Republican	Daniel Farhan Zurbairi	12,438	10.1
Independent	John Horan Latham	5,322	4.3
Write-in		109	0.1

Maryland House of Delegates District 16 election, 2006
Party	Candidate	Votes	%
Democratic	Marilyn R. Goldwater (incumbent)	33,249	25.1
Democratic	Susan C. Lee (incumbent)	33,064	25.0
Democratic	William A. Bronrott (incumbent)	33,004	25.0
Republican	Robert F. Dyer	11,504	8.7
Republican	Angela M. Markelonis	10,924	8.3
Republican	Mike Monroe	10,433	7.9
Write-in		98	0.1

Maryland House of Delegates District 16 election, 2010
Party	Candidate	Votes	%
Democratic	William Frick	29,813	24.3
Democratic	Susan C. Lee (incumbent)	28,768	23.4
Democratic	Ariana Kelly	28,341	23.1
Republican	Jeanne Allen	13,553	11.0
Republican	Carol G. Bowis	11,619	9.5
Republican	Meyer F. Marks	10,678	8.7
Write-in		157	0.1

Maryland Senate District 16 Democratic primary election, 2014
Party	Candidate	Votes	%
Democratic	Susan C. Lee	12,196	85.1
Democratic	Hugh Hill	1,911	13.3
Democratic	J'aime Drayton	231	1.6

Maryland Senate District 16 election, 2014
Party	Candidate	Votes	%
Democratic	Susan C. Lee	28,603	70.0
Republican	Meyer Marks	12,208	29.9
Write-in		53	0.1

Maryland Senate District 16 election, 2018
Party	Candidate	Votes	%
Democratic	Susan C. Lee (incumbent)	48,822	80.1
Republican	Marcus Alzona	12,052	19.8
Write-in		61	0.1

Maryland Senate District 16 election, 2022
Party	Candidate	Votes	%
Democratic	Susan C. Lee (incumbent)	44,925	97.80
Write-in		1,012	2.20

Political offices
Preceded by John C. Wobensmith	Secretary of State of Maryland; 2023–2026	Succeeded by Michael Lore; Acting
