= Odessa Shannon =

African-American human rights campaigner

- Born: July 4, 1928; Washington, DC
- Died: May 17, 2020 (aged 91)
- Education: Smith College
- Occupation: Public servant
- Employer(s): Equal Employment Opportunity Commission; Montgomery County School Board; Montgomery County Human Rights Commission
- Known for: First black woman elected in Montgomery County, Maryland
- Notable work: Founder of the Montgomery County Human Rights Hall of Fame
- Children: 2
- Awards: Maryland Women's Hall of Fame
- Honours: Odessa Shannon Middle School

Odessa M. Shannon (July 4, 1928 – May 17, 2020) was an African-American human rights campaigner from Maryland. In 1982, she became the first black woman elected to a policymaking position in Montgomery County and later established the Montgomery County Human Rights Hall of Fame. In 2022, she was named to the Maryland Women's Hall of Fame.

== Biography ==
=== Early life ===
Odessa M. Shannon was born in Washington, DC on July 4, 1928. After graduating as a valedictorian from Dunbar High School, Shannon moved to Northampton, Massachusetts where she would earn a bachelor's degree from Smith College. At Smith, she was a member of Alpha Kappa Alpha.

After college, Shannon moved to Baltimore where she began teaching in the Baltimore public school district. She later relocated to Silver Spring, in Maryland's Montgomery County. As a newcomer in Montgomery County, she became active in local politics. Shannon then moved from her teaching career to join the federal government at the Equal Employment Opportunity Commission. She would excel during her tenure as a federal employee. Shannon would eventually become the National Program Director for the Equal Employment Opportunity Commission, one of the highest non-appointed roles in the senior executive service.

=== Public service ===
After retirement from the federal government, Shannon became more active in local politics and civic service. In 1982, she became the first black woman elected to the Montgomery County School Board. Her election marked the first time a black woman would serve as an elected official in Montgomery County history. In 1984, she was appointed Special Assistant to the County Executive, becoming the first woman to hold the role.

In 1995, she became the executive director of the Montgomery County Human Rights Commission. In this position, she was behind the creation of the Montgomery County Human Rights Hall of Fame. The Hall of Fame was founded in 2001, and honors those that have made personal sacrifices to improve the civil and human rights of Montgomery County. She would remain executive director of the Human Rights Commission until her retirement in 2008.

Alongside her public positions, Shannon was active in many areas of volunteering in her local community. She served on numerous boards including the Montgomery Housing Partnership, Harriet's List, United Way, the Montgomery County Arts Council, the Regional Institute of Children and Adolescents, and the National Political Congress of Black Women.

=== Death and legacy ===
Shannon died at age 91 on May 17, 2020. Later that year, the Montgomery County School board renamed the former Col. E. Brooke Lee Middle School in Silver Spring in her memory. In honor of her contributions to Montgomery County, the school is now known as the Odessa Shannon Middle School.
