= E. Brooke Lee =

American World War I veteran and politician (1892-1984)

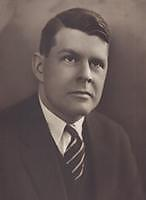
- Lee, c. 1940

90th Speaker of the Maryland House of Delegates
- In office 1927–1930
- Preceded by: Francis P. Curtis
- Succeeded by: Francis A. Michel

Member of the Maryland House of Delegates from Montgomery County
- In office 1927–1930

41st Secretary of State of Maryland
- In office 1923–1925
- Governor: Albert Ritchie
- Preceded by: Philip B. Perlman
- Succeeded by: David C. Winebrenner III

25th Comptroller of Maryland
- In office 1920–1922
- Governor: Albert Ritchie
- Preceded by: Hugh A. McMullen
- Succeeded by: William S. Gordy Jr.

Personal details
- Born: Edward Brooke Lee; October 23, 1892 Washington, D.C., U.S.
- Died: September 21, 1984 (aged 91) Damascus, Maryland, U.S.
- Resting place: Rock Creek Cemetery (Washington, D.C., U.S.)
- Party: Democratic
- Spouses: Elizabeth Wilson (m. 1914; div. 1935); Thelma Lawson (m. 1935; div. 1948); Nina Jones Poole (m. 1949)
- Children: 4, including Blair III
- Parent: Blair Lee I (father)
- Relatives: Lee family
- Education: George Washington University (LLB)
- Occupation: Lawyer; military officer; politician

Military service
- Allegiance: United States
- Branch/service: United States Army; Maryland National Guard
- Years of service: 1912–1918
- Rank: Lieutenant colonel
- Unit: 29th Infantry Division
- Battles/wars: World War I
- Awards: Distinguished Service Cross; Croix de Guerre (France); Order of Leopold (Belgium)

Edward Brooke Lee (October 23, 1892 – September 21, 1984) was a Maryland politician and a veteran of World War I.

== Early life and education ==
Lee was born on October 23, 1892, at the Blair-Lee House in Washington, D.C. His parents were Francis Preston Blair Lee and Anne Clymer (Brooke) Lee. Blair Lee represented Maryland in the U.S. Senate. E. Brooke Lee's great-great-grandfather, Richard Henry Lee, signed the Declaration of Independence and represented Virginia in the U.S. Senate. E. Brooke Lee's great-uncle was Montgomery Blair, who served as postmaster general during Abraham Lincoln's presidency.

Lee attended the Pomfret School in Pomfret, Connecticut, where he graduated in 1912. He attended Princeton University, but left the university in good standing during his sophomore year in 1916 to serve as his father's legislative assistant in the U.S. Senate. Lee then attended George Washington University Law School in Washington, D.C., where he graduated in 1917.

== Career ==
=== Maryland National Guard ===
Lee joined Maryland National Guard F Company, 1st Maryland Infantry of Hyattsville in 1912. Lee and Frank L. Hewitt, another businessman and real estate investor, helped build an armory and organize a new Maryland Guard company, Company K, located in Silver Spring in 1914; the armory was later remodeled and now houses the Silver Spring Volunteer Fire Department.

Lee advanced through the ranks to first lieutenant. Company K was activated into federal service on June 28, 1916, to Eagle Pass, Texas. Lee commanded Company K and helped General John J. Pershing pursue Mexican revolutionary and bandit Pancho Villa, who had been running border patrols along the Rio Grande River into New Mexico. Company K continued its federal service until June 28, 1916.

Lee was promoted to captain, infantry, National Guard of Maryland on January 29, 1917. Soon after, the United States entered World War I, and Company K was again mustered into federal service in June 1917. Lee and Company K encamped at Blair Lee's field west of Georgia Avenue and north of Kalmia Road in Washington, D.C. The National Guard unit of 150 men was sent to Camp McClellan, near Anniston, Alabama, in August 1917 for a period of ten months of training, emerging as Company K of the 115th Infantry, 29th Division of the American Expeditionary Force.

=== World War I ===
From 1917 to 1918, Lee served in France during World War I as part of the 115th Infantry Regiment, 29th Infantry Division, American Expeditionary Forces.

While commanding of a raiding party against the Central Powers near Balschwiller, France, on the morning of August 31, 1918, Lee led soldiers' advance through the enemy wire. Lee was the last person to leave the opposing forces' trenches, and he carried wounded soldiers back through the counter-barrage. Lee spent the entire day of August 31 in a shell hole in no man's land because he wanted to help all wounded soldiers return to the American line. For this, Lee was awarded the Distinguished Service Cross and the Silver Star Citation.

Lee received a promotion to the rank of major. He twice received the French Croix de Guerre. Lee also received the Belgian Order of Leopold.

In June 1918, Lee was discharged from active duty with the rank of lieutenant colonel, and he was generally considered a war hero.

After World War I, Lee became chief of staff of the 29th Infantry Division of the Maryland National Guard.

=== Maryland political involvement ===
In 1919, a group of Maryland Democrats approached Lee to encourage him to run for Maryland Comptroller. Lee repeatedly turned them down. The Democratic candidate for Maryland governor, Albert Ritchie, also urged Lee to run.

In a 1977 interview, Lee said, "I had an interesting experience when the transport got into Norfolk harbor or Newport News harbor. They threw The Baltimore Sun on board, and The Baltimore Sun edition that they threw on board said, 'Senator Smith Favors Young Lee for Comptroller."

Lee campaigned on the ticket of Governor Albert Ritchie as the 25th comptroller of the State of Maryland. In 1921, Lee co-founded United Democratic Clubs of Montgomery County, and he served as its treasurer.

=== Maryland Secretary of State ===
In 1923, Lee was the secretary of state of Maryland, and he served in that position for two years. He represented Montgomery County in the Maryland House of Delegates between 1927 and 1930, during which time he also served as the Speaker of the House of Delegates. In 1933, Governor Ritchie appointed Lee to the Committee on Public Works. Lee served as the State Roads Commissioner in 1934.

=== Zoning advocacy ===
Lee set up the first land-use and zoning system for Montgomery County. Lee strongly advocated for using zoning laws to plan suburban growth in the county. In 1916, Lee helped establish the Washington Suburban Sanitary Commission to control the development of regional water and sewer systems that were necessary for the county's growth.

In the early 1920s, Lee began to purchase large tracts of farming land and founded the North Washington Realty Company to develop those properties as racially restricted suburban communities. These restrictive covenants forbid the purchase or reselling of these properties by people of "African descent" and remained in effect until 1948 when the Supreme Court in Shelley v. Kraemer ruled they were unenforceable. Lee continued to defend racially restrictive covenants well into the 1960s, claiming that "since law-enforced opening of homes and home communities is only aimed at White owned homes and White occupied communities, the law-enforced open housing statutes are Anti-White laws" in a letter to the Bethesda-Chevy Chase Advertiser in March, 1967.

In December 1926, Lee proposed a tax on certain parts of Montgomery and Prince George's counties in order to pay for street construction, lighting, garbage collection, and ash collection.

In January 1927, Lee proposed the creation of the Maryland-National Capital Park and Planning Commission, led by three commissioners appointed by the governor. The commission was funded through tax revenue from residents in Montgomery and Prince George's counties.

=== Farming ===
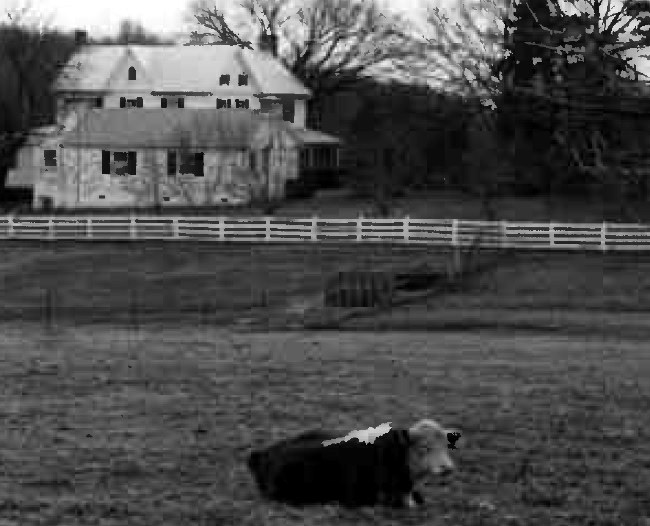
Lee's Old Gartrell Farm in Damascus, Maryland

Lee spent the last 30 years of his life at the Old Gartrell Farm, located on Sweepstakes Road in Damascus, Maryland, where he farmed and raised Polled Hereford cattle in Maryland, Missouri, and Mississippi. He became the largest breeder of Polled Hereford cattle in the United States. and was the first member of the Polled Hereford Hall of Fame in Kansas City, Missouri, in 1960.

Maryland Hereford Association named an award after Lee and his third wife Nina G. Jones. The Nina and E. Brooke Lee Award is awarded in recognition of education, leadership, and support of the Maryland Hereford Association and Maryland's Hereford industry.

== Personal life ==
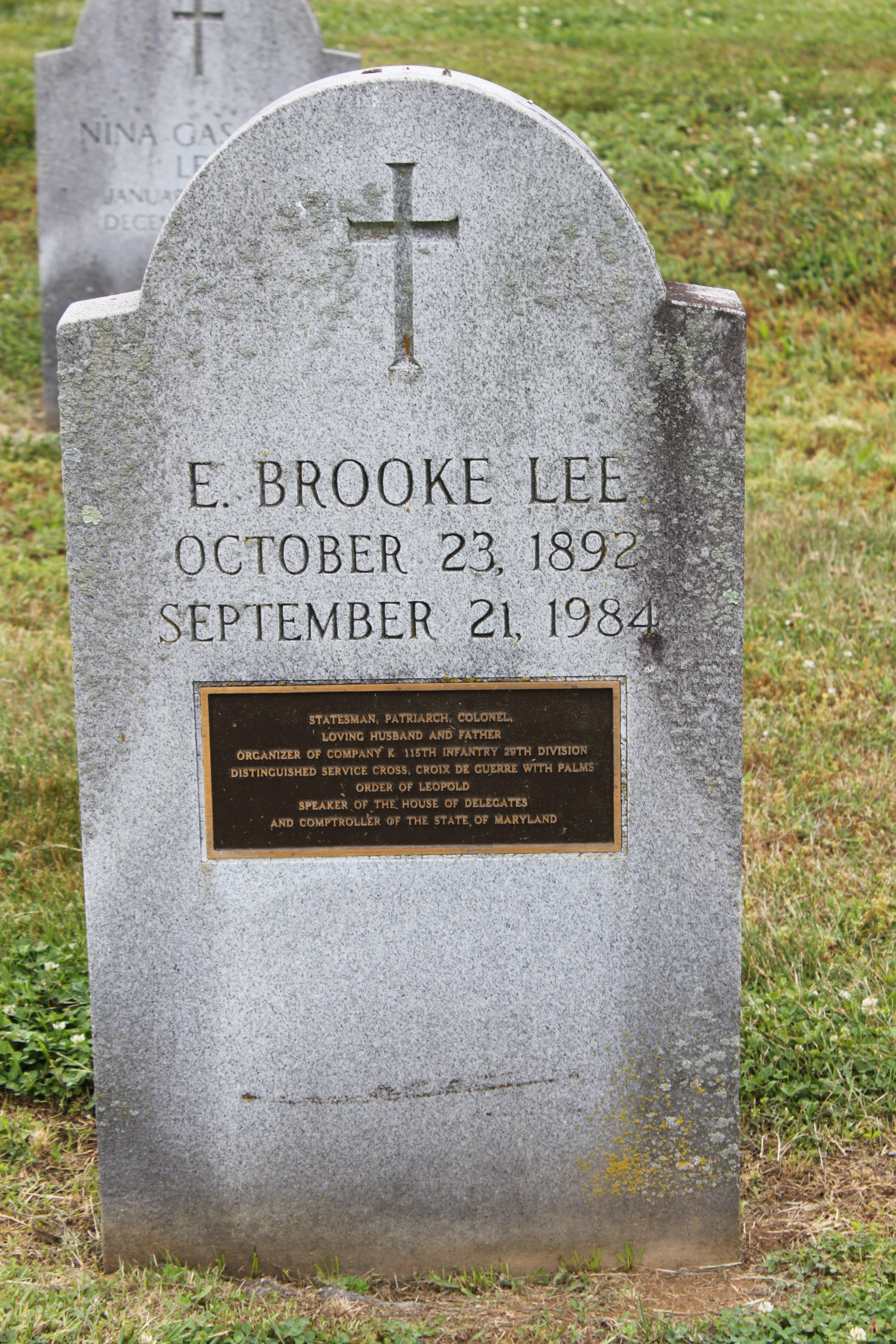
Lee's gravesite in Rock Creek Cemetery in Washington, D.C.

On April 13, 1914, Lee married Elizabeth Somerville Wilson, the daughter of Maryland Senator Joseph S. Wilson. They had two sons- the elder being Blair Lee III- and a daughter, Elizabeth Lee Scull, herself involved in politics and as an activist in community affairs, who predeceased her father in 1981. With his second wife, Thelma Lawson, Lee had a son, Bruce.

Lee died of pneumonia in Damascus, Maryland, on September 21, 1984, at the age of 91. He is buried at Rock Creek Cemetery in Washington, D.C.

== Legacy ==
In 1966, Col. E. Brooke Lee Middle School, named in honor of Lee, opened in Kemp Mill, Maryland. In early 2019, Montgomery County Council President Nancy Navarro wrote to the county school system to request that it change the school's name in tribute to Odessa Shannon's lifelong opposition to racial segregation. Shannon was elected to the Montgomery County Board of Education in 1982, which made her the first Black woman elected to public office in Montgomery County. Shannon was also the executive director of the Montgomery County Human Rights Commission, and founded the county's Human Rights Hall of Fame. The school's name was changed to Odessa Shannon Middle School on July 4, 2021.

Political offices
Preceded by Philip B. Perlman	Secretary of State of Maryland; 1923–1925	Succeeded by David C. Winebrenner III
