= Barbara A. Frush =

American politician

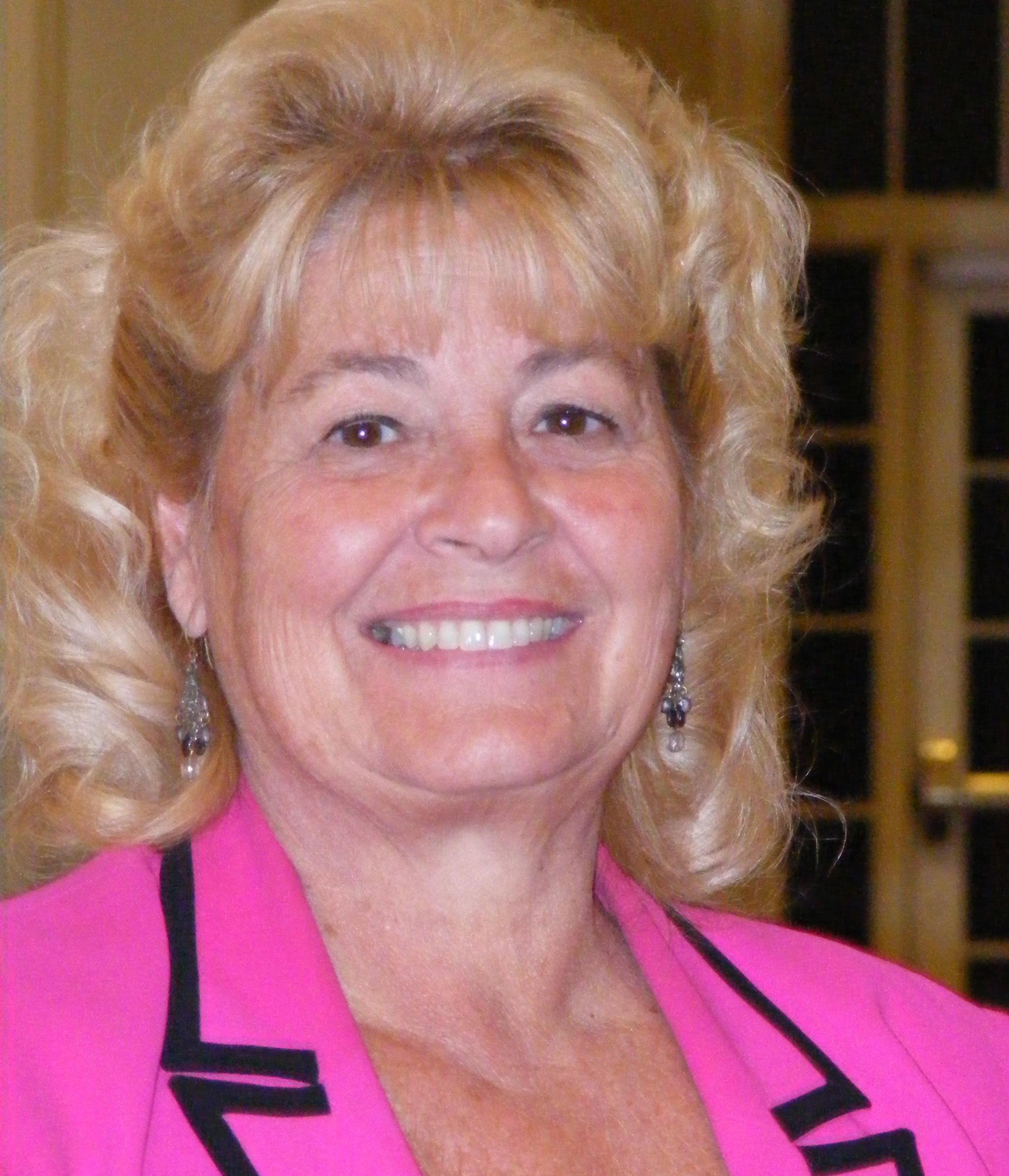

Member of the Maryland House of Delegates from the 21st district
- In office January 11, 1995 – January 9, 2019
- Succeeded by: Mary A. Lehman

Personal details
- Born: May 31, 1945 Washington, D.C.
- Died: October 2026 (aged 81)
- Party: Democratic
- Spouse(s): Ronald Franklin Frush, deceased
- Children: 2

Barbara A. Frush (May 31, 1945 – October 2026) was an American politician from Maryland who was a member of the Democratic Party. She served 6 terms in the Maryland House of Delegates, representing Maryland's District 21 in Anne Arundel and Prince George's Counties.

== Background ==
Frush was born in Washington, DC and attended Northwestern High School in Hyattsville, Maryland.

== In the legislature ==
Frush was first elected in 1994, serving 6 four-year terms from 1995 to 2019. During her tenure, she sat on many different committees, including the Environmental Matters Committee from 1995 to 2015 and the Environment and Transportation Committee from 2015 to 2019.

She was a member of the Joint Committee on the Chesapeake and Atlantic Coastal Bays Critical Area from 2003 to 2015, and served as its House Chair in 2003. From 2007 to 2008, Frush was the Chair of the Prince George's County Delegation.

Frush declined to run again in the 2018 election, instead working on Rushern Baker's campaign for the 2018 Maryland gubernatorial election.

Frush died in October 2026.
