= List of presidents of the University of Maryland, Baltimore County =

President of the University of Maryland, Baltimore County
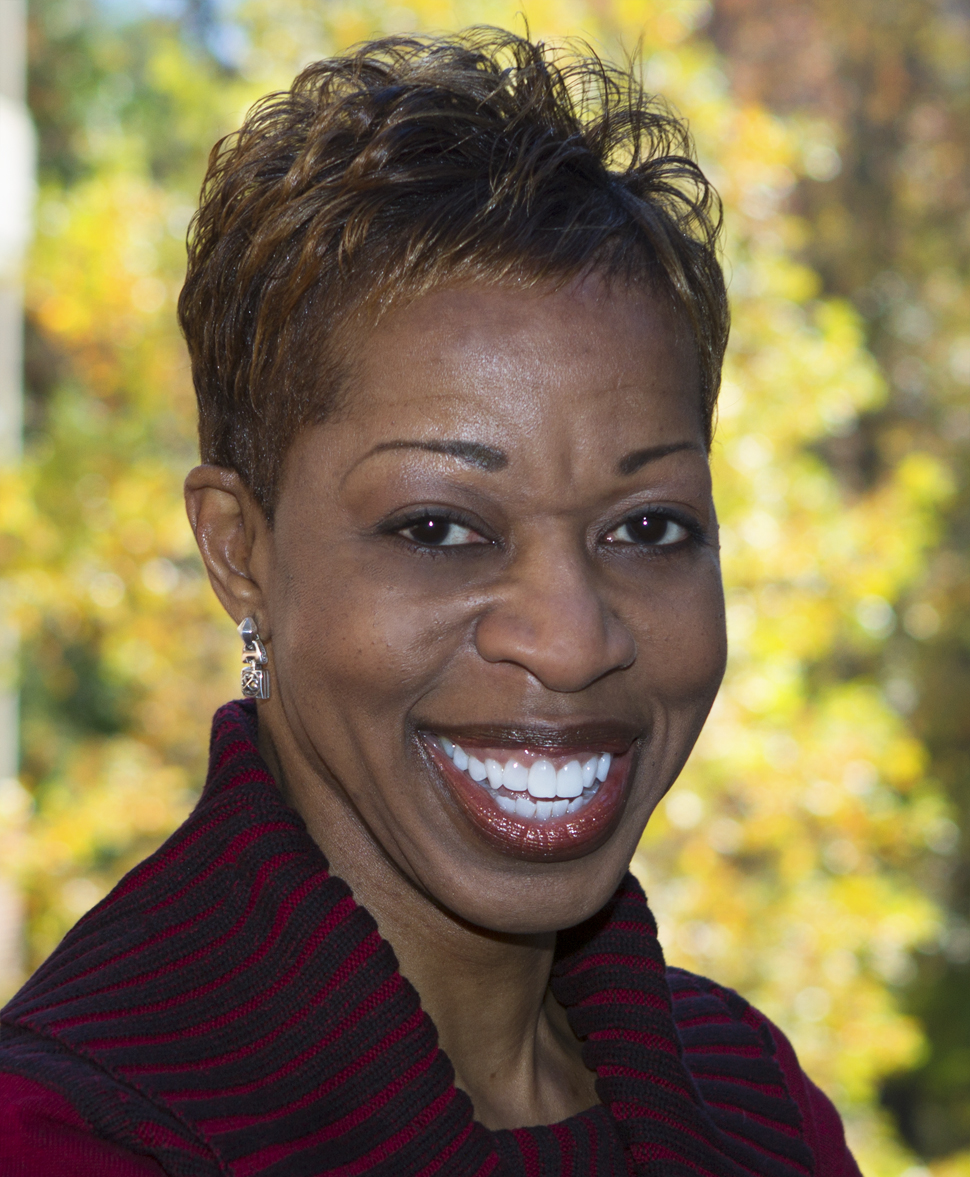
- Incumbent; Valerie Ashby since April 28, 2022
- Reports to: University System of Maryland Board of Regents
- Seat: University of Maryland, Baltimore County
- Appointer: University System of Maryland Board of Regents
- Formation: 1965
- First holder: Albin Owings Kuhn
- Salary: $574,000 (2019)
- Website: president.umbc.edu

The president of the University of Maryland, Baltimore County, manages the day-to-day operations of the University of Maryland, Baltimore County. The president is expected to work cooperatively with the University Senate and the University System of Maryland Board of Regents to effectively manage the university.

Freeman Hrabowski is the longest serving leader of UMBC having served for 29–30 years.

== Chancellors of the University of Maryland, Baltimore County ==
Albin Owings Kuhn was the founding chancellor of UMBC, as well as the University of Maryland, Baltimore. Following the leave of Louis L. Kaplan in 1977, John W. Dorsey in the office of the president assumed the responsibilities of chancellor.

- Albin Owings Kuhn – Vice President of the University of Maryland Baltimore Campuses. Chancellor of UMBC from 1965 to 1971
- Calvin B. T. Lee – Chancellor, 1971–1976
- Louis L. Kaplan – Served as Interim Chancellor from 1976 to 1977
- John W. Dorsey – President, 1977–1986

== Presidents of the University of Maryland, Baltimore County ==
In 1989, the office of the president was re-established following the re-organization of the public schools of Maryland under the new University System of Maryland.

- Michael Hooker – President, 1986–1992
- Freeman A. Hrabowski III – President, 1992–2022
- Valerie Sheares Ashby – President since 2022

== See also ==
- List of University of Maryland, Baltimore County people
