= 1982 Dome of the Rock shooting =

Shooting at the Dome of the Rock in 1982

On 11 April 1982, American-Israeli reservist Alan Harry Goodman targeted the Dome of the Rock in a shooting, killing two Palestinians and wounding at least seven.

== Shooting ==
On 11 April 1982, many Christian pilgrims were present in the Old City of Jerusalem to mark Easter Sunday, an important Christian festival. At 9:10 am that morning, a man dressed in Israeli military uniform entered the Temple Mount carrying an M16 rifle and a sleeping bag. When two guards attempted to stop him and tell him it was forbidden to carry a weapon inside, he opened fire. He then ran to the Dome of the Rock and fired at the visitors until he ran out of ammunition.

The perpetrator of the shooting was identified as Alan Harry Goodman, a 38-year old American-born reservist in the Israeli military. The Ministry of Interior stated that Goodman had registered as a temporary resident of Israel in 1977 and then as a permanent resident in 1980. He had grown up in Baltimore in the United States, attending Baltimore City College as a teenager, and Case Western Reserve University later. When he was arrested by Israeli border police, he claimed that "I had to do it. They are killing my friends and relatives. I am taking revenge."

Later that day, as news of the shooting spread, demonstrations broke out in the West Bank, clashing with Israeli security forces. At least 30 of the protestors in Jerusalem were injured when Israeli forces dispersed the demonstration with tear gas and gunfire.

== Reactions ==
Mayor of Jerusalem Teddy Kollek condemned the shooting, and warned that there were "small, very extreme groups, who, by the atmosphere they create, will enable the world to identify the Jewish people – which is entirely opposed to this kind of thing — as bearing some responsibility." Pope John Paul II described the shooting as a "rash gesture" and called for an end to the "clouds of concern which are thickening upon the land of Jesus and in the Middle East region." The United States Department of State described the shooting as "obviously the work of a deranged individual."

A United Nations Security Council debate was convened to debate "The Situation in The Occupied Arab Territories" following the shooting. In the debate, the Moroccan ambassador accused the Israeli government of "passivity if not collusion" with extremist groups within Israel. Israeli Permanent Representative Yehuda Zvi Blum described the shooting as "an act of lunacy," but called the convening of the Security Council "bigotry of the highest degree" and that it had been convened to "fan the flames of religious hatred and incitement." Prime Minister of Israel Menachem Begin condemned the attack as a "tragedy," and accused the Security Council of "attempting to place an entire nation in the dock on account of the crime of one, mentally-ill man."

King Khalid of Saudi Arabia called for a general strike across Muslim-majority nations on 15 April to protest the shooting. Demonstrations and strike action that day were observed in 15 different countries, particularly within Saudi Arabia, and Lebanese flag carrier Middle East Airlines suspended flights.

== Trial and incarceration ==
The far-right Jewish Defense League pledged to provide legal assistance to Goodman. Goodman was represented by lawyer Baruch Ben Yosef.

The Jerusalem District Court ordered Goodman to undergo psychological evaluation to determine whether he was fit to stand trial. Goodman would then plead insanity, saying that he was a paranoid schizophrenic. However, the insanity plea was rejected by the court. During the trial investigations, Goodman stated that he had carried out the attack as revenge for the Coastal Road massacre, perpetrated by Fatah in 1978.

In April 1983, Goodman was sentenced to life imprisonment plus 40 years. After hearing his conviction, Goodman shouted for "Arab Nazis" to be killed, saying "Three hundred Israeli atomic bombs kills Arab Nazism. Three hundred Israeli atomic bombs kills Arab racism."

Goodman's sentence was later reduced by Israeli president Chaim Herzog, and then again by Ezer Weizman, down to 24 years. He was released from prison in October 1997 on parole on condition that he would return to the United States and not enter Israel again for the next eight years.

Goodman's release provoked mixed reactions in Baltimore. In an interview with Dan Fesperman of The Baltimore Sun, Goodman claimed he was not dangerous and that the shooting was one of the greatest moments of his life. The Sun condemned Goodman's release, saying that it "gave the impression that the Netanyahu government takes Palestinian life lightly." Robert Freedman of Baltimore Hebrew University reacted to the release by saying that Israel had exported "a convicted murderer who in no way has atoned for what he did," saying that the release was potentially in reaction to the release of several Palestinian prisoners following the failed assassination attempt of high-ranking Hamas figure Khaled Mashal.
