= 2012 Maryland Question 4 =

Referendum Question 4
- November 6, 2012
- Public Institutions of Higher Education – Tuition Rates

Results
Choice	Votes	%
Yes	1,521,579	58.87%
No	1,063,228	41.13%
Valid votes	2,584,807	100.00%
Invalid or blank votes	0	0.00%
Total votes	2,584,807	100.00%

Yes
90–100%
80–90%
70–80%
60–70%
50–60%
No
70–80%
60–70%
50–60%

Question 4 is a referendum that appeared on the general election ballot for the U.S. state of Maryland to allow voters to approve or reject the Maryland Dream Act, a state law that allowed undocumented students to pay in-state tuition rates at Maryland colleges and universities. The referendum was approved by 58.9% of the voters on November 6, 2012.

The Maryland Dream Act, along with the Civil Marriage Protection Act, were the first bills to be petitioned to a statewide referendum since 1992. In passing the bill, Maryland became the first state to approve legislation expanding in-state tuition to undocumented immigrant students via popular vote.

== Ballot measure ==
The ballot measure read as follows:

Question 4
Public Institutions of Higher Education - Tuition Rates

Establishes that individuals, including undocumented immigrants, are eligible to pay in-state tuition rates at community colleges in Maryland, provided the student meets certain conditions relating to attendance and graduation from a Maryland high school, filing of income taxes, intent to apply for permanent residency, and registration with the selective service system (if required); makes such students eligible to pay in-state tuition rates at a four-year public college or university if the student has first completed 60 credit hours or graduated from a community college in Maryland; provides that students qualifying for in-state tuition rates by this method will not be counted as in-state students for purposes of counting undergraduate enrollment; and extends the time in which honorably discharged veterans may qualify for in-state tuition rates.

The choices read as follows:

For the Referred Law
Against the Referred Law

== Maryland Dream Act ==
Upon his election to the Maryland Senate in 2010, Victor R. Ramirez drafted legislation that would extend in-state tuition to undocumented students who attend a Maryland high school for at least three years and whose parents have paid state taxes. An amendment requiring students to also attend two years of community college was added to the bill during a committee hearing in the Maryland Senate. Another amendment that waived the tax requirement if the student's parents can prove they were unable to work during their child's high school years was added to the bill in the House of Delegates, but removed by the conference committee. The bill was introduced amid a rise in anti-illegal immigrant sentiment in the United States, during which legislatures in a number of states passed legislation barring undocumented students from receiving in-state tuition.

The Maryland Senate voted 27–20 to pass the Dream Act on March 14, 2011, and the Maryland House of Delegates voted 74–66 to pass the bill on April 4, 2011. Along with all Republican state legislators, eight Democratic state senators and 24 Democratic state delegates voted against the bill. Governor Martin O'Malley signed the Maryland Dream Act into law on May 10, 2011.

== Campaign ==
Within days of the Dream Act passing the Maryland General Assembly, state delegates Neil Parrott and Pat McDonough organized efforts to repeal the law through referendum. Parrott utilized his website, MDPetitions.com, to organize citizen activists to gather signatures for the ballot initiative. The group submitted 108,923 signatures to the Maryland State Board of Elections, which were certified by the elections board in July. In August 2011, CASA de Maryland filed a lawsuit challenging the validity of the signatures collected by MDPetitions.com, which was rejected by Anne Arundel County circuit court judge Ronald A. Silkworth in February 2012. CASA appealed Silkworth's ruling to the Maryland Court of Appeals, which upheld the lower court ruling.

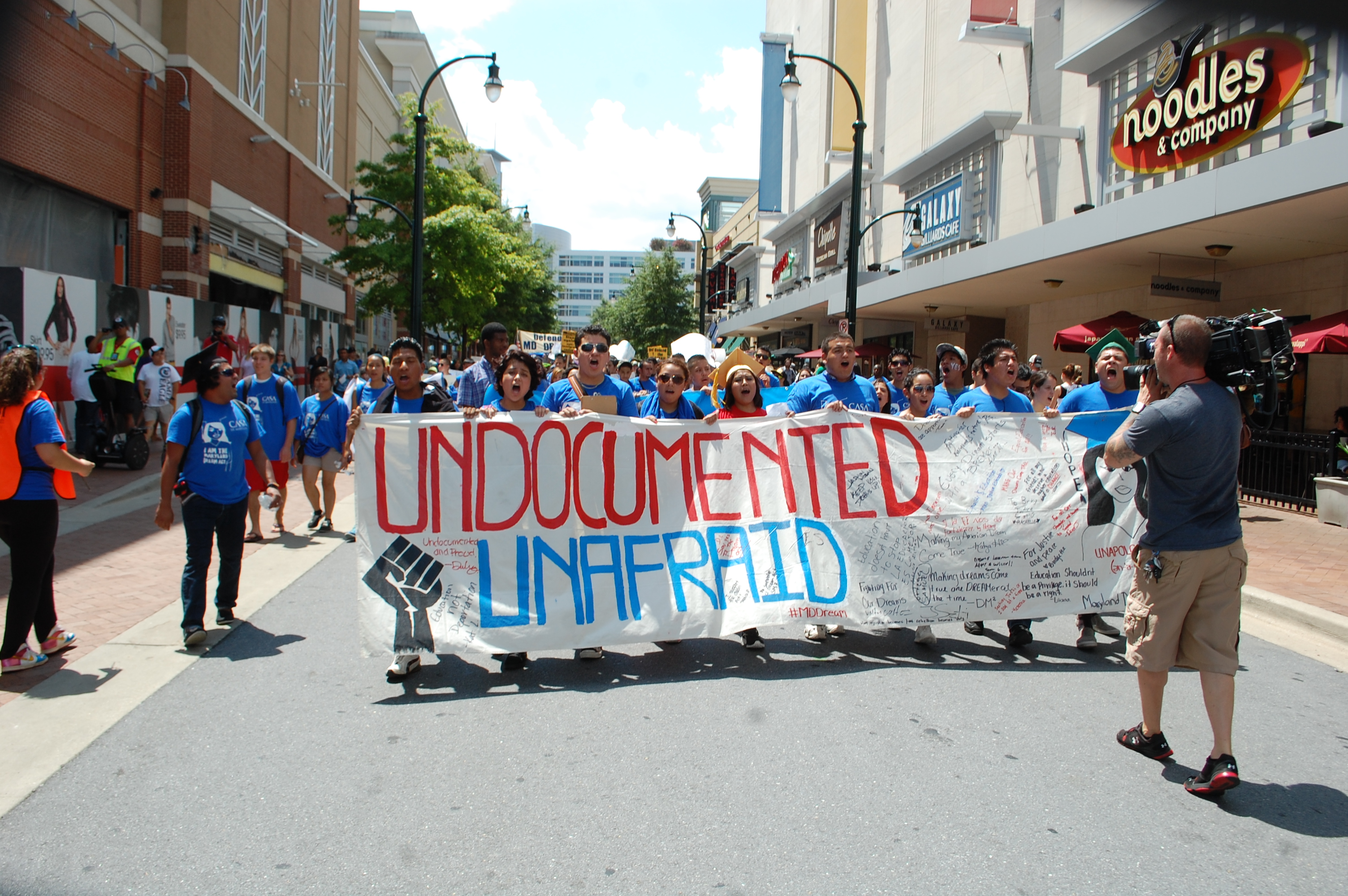
Maryland Dream Act supporters rally in Silver Spring, August 2012

Opponents of the Maryland Dream Act focused their criticism on the bill's costs—which the nonpartisan Maryland Department of Legislative Services estimated to be around $3.5 million a year when fully implemented—claiming that the bill would encourage illegal immigration to Maryland and increase enrollments at state universities. The bill's supporters argued that the bill would increase graduation rates among high school dropouts and students who would not otherwise be able to attend universities, and that the state's colleges would only see around a thousand new students as a result of the bill. In October 2012, the University of Maryland, Baltimore County published a report suggesting that the Maryland Dream Act would reduce the state's college graduate incarceration rate and provide undocumented students with access to higher-paying jobs, saving the state $5 million per graduating class. Dream Act opponents pointed out that this report also claimed that state universities would lose $1.8 million (about a 0.1 percent drop) from accepting undocumented students, which would require legislators to increase taxes to make up for the lost revenue, and argued that employers would be hesitant to hire undocumented immigrants to higher-paying positions.

Question 4 was supported by Educating Maryland Kids, a coalition made up of immigrant rights groups, the Maryland Catholic Conference, and teacher unions; by October 2012, supporters raised $1.5 million to support campaigning efforts. Opponents of the Maryland Dream Act did not do any fundraising, as Parrott said it was not his group's plan to do so. The bill's opponents barely campaigned against the measure, coordinating their efforts through Facebook and e-mail to distribute yard signs and bumper stickers.

=== Endorsements ===
Yes

U.S. Senators

- Ben Cardin, Maryland (2007–present) (Democrat)

U.S. Representatives

- Elijah Cummings, MD-07 (1996–present) (Democrat)
- Steny Hoyer, House Minority Whip (2011–present) from MD-05 (1981–present) (Democrat)
- Chris Van Hollen, MD-08 (2003–present) (Democrat)

Statewide officials

- Anthony Brown, Lieutenant Governor of Maryland (2007–present) (Democrat)
- Doug Gansler, Attorney General of Maryland (2007–present) (Democrat)
- Martin O'Malley, 61st Governor of Maryland (2007–present) (Democrat)

State legislators

- Aisha Braveboy, state delegate from the 25th district (2007–present) (Democrat)
- Bill Ferguson, state senator from the 46th district (2011–present) (Democrat)
- Heather Mizeur, state delegate from the 20th district (2007–present) (Democrat)
- Paul G. Pinsky, state senator from the 22nd district (1994–present) (Democrat)
- Victor R. Ramirez, state senator from the 47th district (2011–present) (Democrat)

County officials

- Angela Alsobrooks, Prince George's County state's attorney (2010–present) (Democrat)
- Rushern Baker, Prince George's County Executive (2010–present) (Democrat)
- Ike Leggett, Montgomery County Executive (2006–present) (Democrat)

Individuals

- Mariann Budde, bishop of the Diocese of Washington
- Zeke Cohen, teacher (Democrat)
- Charlene Dukes, president of Prince George's Community College (2007–present) (Democrat)
- Freeman A. Hrabowski III, president of the University of Maryland, Baltimore County (1992–present)
- Ben Jealous, president of the NAACP (2008–present) (Democrat)
- William Kirwan, chancellor of the University System of Maryland (2002–present)
- Wallace Loh, president of the University of Maryland, College Park (2010–present)
- William E. Lori, archbishop of the Archdiocese of Baltimore
- Denis J. Madden, auxiliary bishop of the Archdiocese of Baltimore
- Javier Miyares, president of University of Maryland Global Campus (2012–present)
- Rob Sobhani, author and lecturer (Independent)
- Eugene Sutton, bishop of the Episcopal Diocese of Maryland

Labor unions

- AFL-CIO
- American Federation of Teachers
- Maryland State Education Association
- Service Employees International Union

Organizations

- CASA de Maryland
- NAACP

Newspapers

- Baltimore Afro-American
- The Washington Post
No

Statewide officials

- Kris Kobach, Kansas Secretary of State (2011–present) (Republican)

State legislators

- Kathy Afzali, state delegate from the 4th district (2011–present) (Republican)
- James Brochin, state senator from the 42nd district (2003–present) (Democrat)
- Nancy Jacobs, state senator form the 34th district (1999–present) (Republican)
- Jay Jacobs, state delegate from the 36th district (2011–present) (Republican)
- Nic Kipke, state delegate from the 31st district (2007–present) (Republican)
- Susan Krebs, state delegate from district 9B (2003–present) (Republican)
- Pat McDonough, state delegate from the 7th district (2003–present) (Republican)
- Tony O'Donnell, minority leader of the Maryland House of Delegates (2007–present) from district 29C (1995–present) (Republican)
- Neil Parrott, state delegate from district 2B (2011–present) (Republican)
- Justin Ready, state delegate from the 5th district (2011–present) (Republican)
- Edward R. Reilly, state senator from the 33rd district (2009–present) (Republican)
- Steve Schuh, state delegate from the 31st district (2007–present) (Republican)
- Michael D. Smigiel Sr., state delegate from the 36th district (2003–present) (Republican)

County officials

- Haven Shoemaker, member of the Carroll County Board of Commissioners from the 2nd district (2010–present) (Republican)

Individuals

- Ann Corcoran, anti-refugee activist and blogger

Organizations

- Judicial Watch

== Opinion polls ==
Poll source	Date(s) administered	Sample size (Note: Key: A – all adults RV – registered voters LV – likely voters V – unclear)	Margin of error	For	Against	Undecided
OpinionWorks	October 20–23, 2012	801 (LV)	± 3.5%	47%	45%	8%
The Washington Post	October 11–15, 2012	843 (LV)	± 4.0%	60%	35%	5%
The Washington Post	October 11–15, 2012	934 (RV)	± 4.0%	59%	35%	5%
OpinionWorks	September 25–27, 2012	804 (LV)	± 3.5%	44%	41%	15%
Gonzales Research	September 17–23, 2012	813 (RV)	± 3.5%	58%	34%	8%
Gonzales Research	September 19–27, 2011	805 (RV)	± 3.5%	47%	51%	3%

== Results ==
Question 4 passed handily in many of Maryland's suburban and urban counties, but saw its weakest support in non-Hispanic white neighborhoods in more rural areas of the state.

2012 Maryland Question 4
Choice	Votes	%
For	1,521,579	58.87
Against	1,063,228	41.13
Total	2,584,807	100.00

=== By county ===
By county

Breakdown of voting by county
County	Yes		No		Margin		TotalVotes
County	#	%	#	%	#	%	TotalVotes
Allegany	11,009	34.2%	16,631	65.8%	-5,622	-20.3%	27,640
Anne Arundel	124,741	49.6%	126,632	50.4%	-1,891	-0.8%	251,373
Baltimore City	168,279	70.6%	70,137	29.4%	98,142	41.2%	238,416
Baltimore	196,470	52.9%	175,064	47.1%	21,406	5.8%	371,534
Calvert	20,352	47.0%	22,983	53.0%	-2,631	-6.1%	43,335
Caroline	5,122	40.2%	7,623	59.8%	-2,501	-19.6%	12,745
Carroll	31,941	37.6%	53,102	62.4%	-21,161	-24.9%	85,043
Cecil	17,478	43.1%	23,047	56.9%	-5,569	-13.7%	40,525
Charles	43,451	59.9%	29,071	40.1%	14,380	19.8%	72,522
Dorchester	6,798	47.9%	7,402	52.1%	-604	-4.3%	14,200
Frederick	55,805	49.7%	56,393	50.3%	-588	-0.5%	112,198
Garrett	4,572	37.2%	7,708	62.8%	-3,136	-25.5%	12,280
Harford	50,805	41.5%	71,678	58.5%	-20,873	-17.0%	122,483
Howard	90,566	61.1%	57,726	38.9%	32,830	22.1%	148,282
Kent	4,652	49.6%	4,722	50.4%	-70	-0.7%	9,374
Montgomery	313,681	72.3%	120,097	27.7%	193,584	44.6%	433,778
Prince George's	273,752	74.9%	91,588	25.1%	182,164	49.9%	365,340
Queen Anne's	9,730	40.4%	14,368	59.6%	-4,638	-19.2%	24,098
St. Mary's	21,706	47.6%	23,868	52.4%	-2,162	-4.7%	45,574
Somerset	5,125	53.7%	4,411	46.3%	714	7.5%	9,536
Talbot	9,369	47.7%	10,269	52.3%	-900	-4.6%	19,638
Washington	23,524	39.6%	35,907	60.4%	-12,383	-20.8%	59,431
Wicomico	20,478	51.8%	19,076	48.2%	1,402	3.5%	39,554
Worcester	12,183	47.0%	13,725	53.0%	-1,542	-6.0%	25,908
Total	1,521,579	58.9%	1,063,228	41.1%	458,351	17.7%	2,584,807
