= Beth Am =

Conservative synagogue in Baltimore, Maryland, U.S.

- Hebrew: ב'ת אם
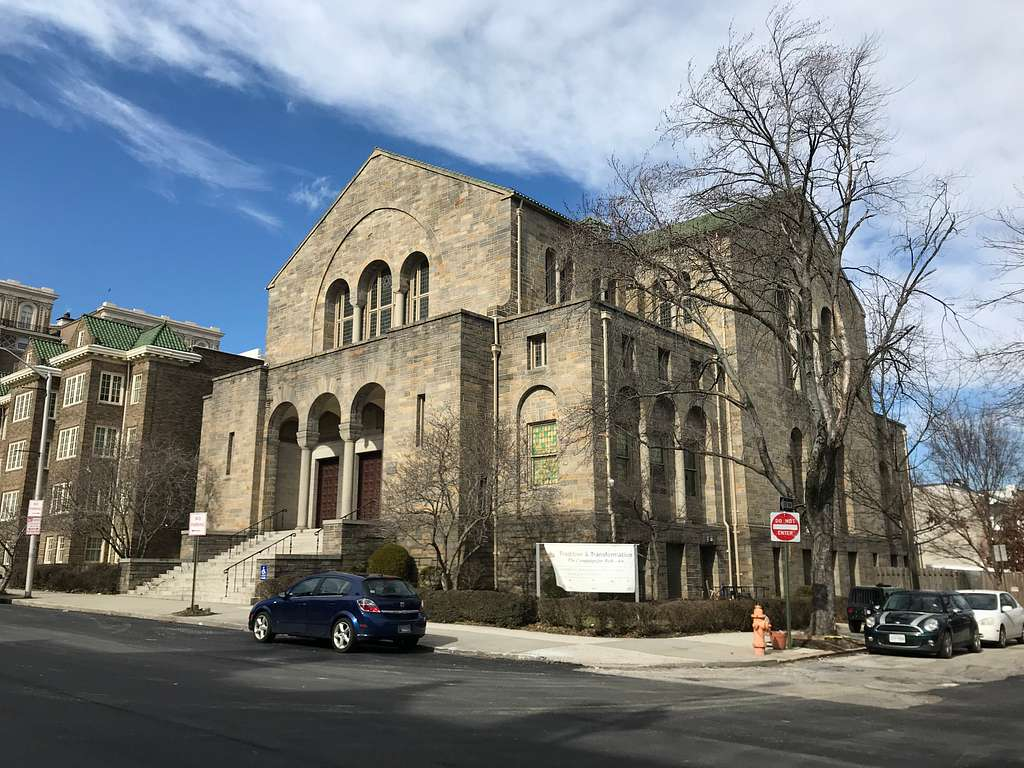
- The Beth Am synagogue building in 2019.

- Location in Baltimore, Maryland

Religion
- Affiliation: Conservative Judaism
- Ecclesiastical or organisational status: Synagogue
- Leadership: Rabbi Daniel Cotzin Burg
- Status: Active

Location
- Location: Reservoir Hill, Baltimore, Maryland
- Country: United States
- Coordinates: 39°18′53″N 76°38′16″W

Architecture
- Established: 1974 (as a congregation)
- Completed: 1922

Website
- bethambaltimore.org

Beth Am (Hebrew: בת' אם, lit. 'House of the People') is a Conservative Jewish congregation and synagogue located in the Reservoir Hill community of Baltimore, Maryland, in the United States. It is one of two non-Orthodox synagogues in Baltimore's inner city. The current congregation was formed in 1974 by Dr. Louis L. Kaplan and other congregants after Chizuk Amuno put the building up for sale.

Beth Am is an urban, egalitarian congregation affiliated with the United Synagogue of Conservative Judaism.

== History ==
The building currently known as "Beth Am" was first founded as Chizuk Amuno Congregation. The Byzantine-Moorish structure at 2501 Eutaw Place, built in 1922, was designed by renowned local architect Joseph Evans Sperry. The stone, triple-arched building was reportedly modeled after Tempio Maggiore, the Great Synagogue of Florence. Chizuk Amuno first occupied the building in 1922 and moved to a new location in Pikesville in 1958.

Following the move of Chizuk Amuno, services continued in the building, led by Cantor Abba Weisgall. Then, in 1974, the current Beth Am congregation was founded as "Kaplan's Shul" by Dr. Louis L. Kaplan, retired president of Baltimore Hebrew University, and other congregants who wanted to remain in the neighborhood. Kaplan's wife Etta Jenkins suggested the name Beth Am, which translates to "House of the People".

Kaplan served informally as the congregation's spiritual leader until 1981, when the congregation hired its first full-time rabbi, Rabbi Earl Jordan. The first president of the congregation was Efrem Potts, Louis L. Kaplan's son-in-law through his marriage to Deborah Kaplan Potts.

The congregation had no full-time rabbi in the years 2000–2002, when they were served part-time by Rabbi Sheila Russian, who in 1979 became the first female rabbi in Baltimore.

In 2019 the synagogue underwent a major $5.5 million renovation that added new classrooms, a grand new staircase, and a redesigned sanctuary. The renovation was awarded the 2020 Baltimore Heritage Preservation Award.

== Leadership ==
The rabbi as of October 2026 is Rabbi Tyler Dratch, who joined the congregation in 2021, serving first serving as Director of Youth and Family Education and Prayer leader and later as Associate Rabbi. He succeeded Rabbi Daniel Cotzin Burg, who joined the congregation in 2010. The Rabbi Emeritus is Jon Konheim, who has been with the congregation since 2002.

The Cantor Emeritus is Ira Greenstein who served as hazzan from 2000 to 2020.

The congregation is administered by a number of committees over which its executive director and board of trustees presides. The executive direct as of October 2024 is Alex Pomerantz.

== Services and programs ==
=== Religious services ===
As of 2024, Beth Am holds weekly services on Shabbat including a kiddush lunch. The synagogue also hosts once a month services on Friday evenings. Additionally, Beth Am holds services for all Jewish holidays. Beth Am also hosts both B'nai Mitzvahs and Weddings.

=== Education ===
Beth Am operates a Jewish education program for students in kindergarten through the seventh grade called Jewish Discovery Lab. Students explore Hebrew, Jewish prayer, and other topics.

Beth Am also offers an advocacy program for ninth and tenth graders in which students collaborate on legislative campaigns in Baltimore City or at the Maryland State House.

== See also ==
- History of the Jews in Maryland
