= Louis Kaplan =

Louis Kaplan may refer to:

- Kid Kaplan (Louis Kaplan, 1901–1970), Ukrainian boxer
- Louis L. Kaplan (1902–2001), educator in Baltimore, Maryland

== See also ==
- Lewis Kaplan (disambiguation)
