= Ann Corcoran =

Ann Corcoran may refer to:

- Ann Corcoran (politician) (born 1951), Australian politician
- Ann Corcoran (activist) (born 1950 or 1951), American blogger and activist
- Barbara Ann Corcoran (born 1949), American businesswoman and television personality
