= 2025 Prince George's County executive special election =

2025 Prince George's County Executive special election
- June 3, 2025
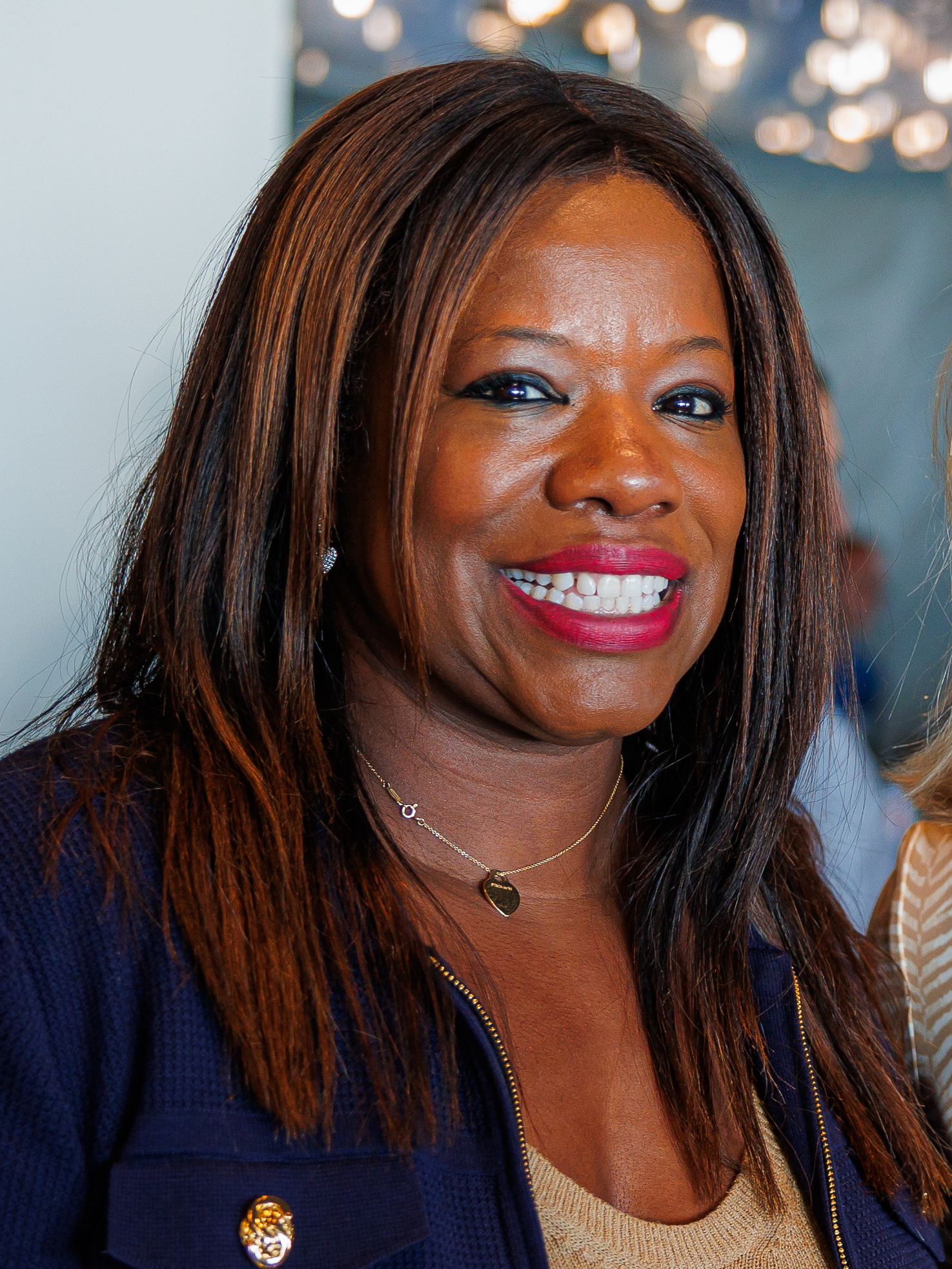

Nominee	Aisha Braveboy	Jonathan White
Party	Democratic	Republican
Popular vote	82,062	7,185
Percentage	91.18%	7.98%
County Executive before election
Tara Jackson (acting)
Democratic
Elected County Executive
Aisha Braveboy
Democratic

The 2025 Prince George's County executive special election was held on June 3, 2025, to fill in the last two years of Prince George's County executive Angela Alsobrooks's term, who resigned on December 2, 2024, following her election to the U.S. Senate. Upon her resignation, the county's chief administrative officer, Tara Jackson, became the acting county executive.

Primary elections were held on March 4, 2025, with state's attorney Aisha Braveboy securing the Democratic nomination and Jonathan White winning the Republican nomination. Democrats enjoy an overwhelming advantage in voter registration in the county; as a result, victory in the Democratic primary is tantamount to election. Braveboy easily defeated White in the general election.

== Democratic primary ==
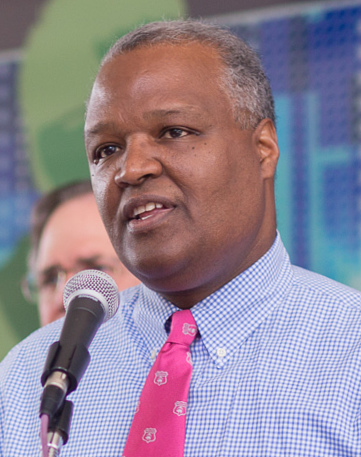
Rushern Baker

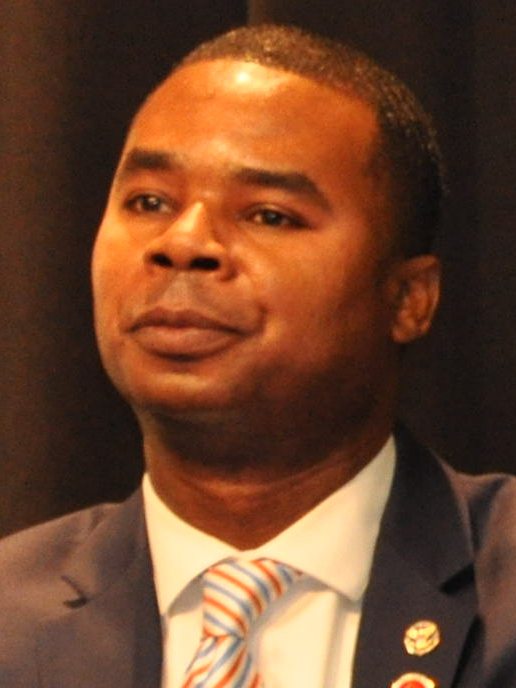
Marcellus Crews

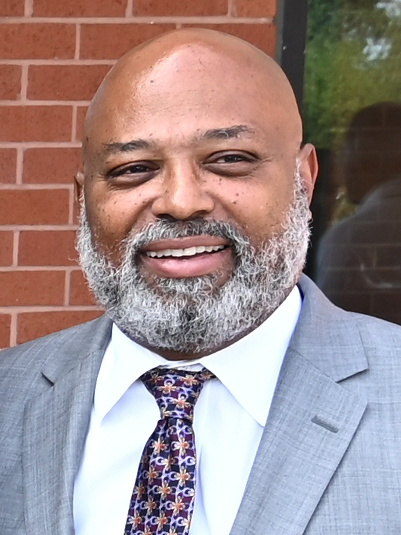
Calvin Hawkins

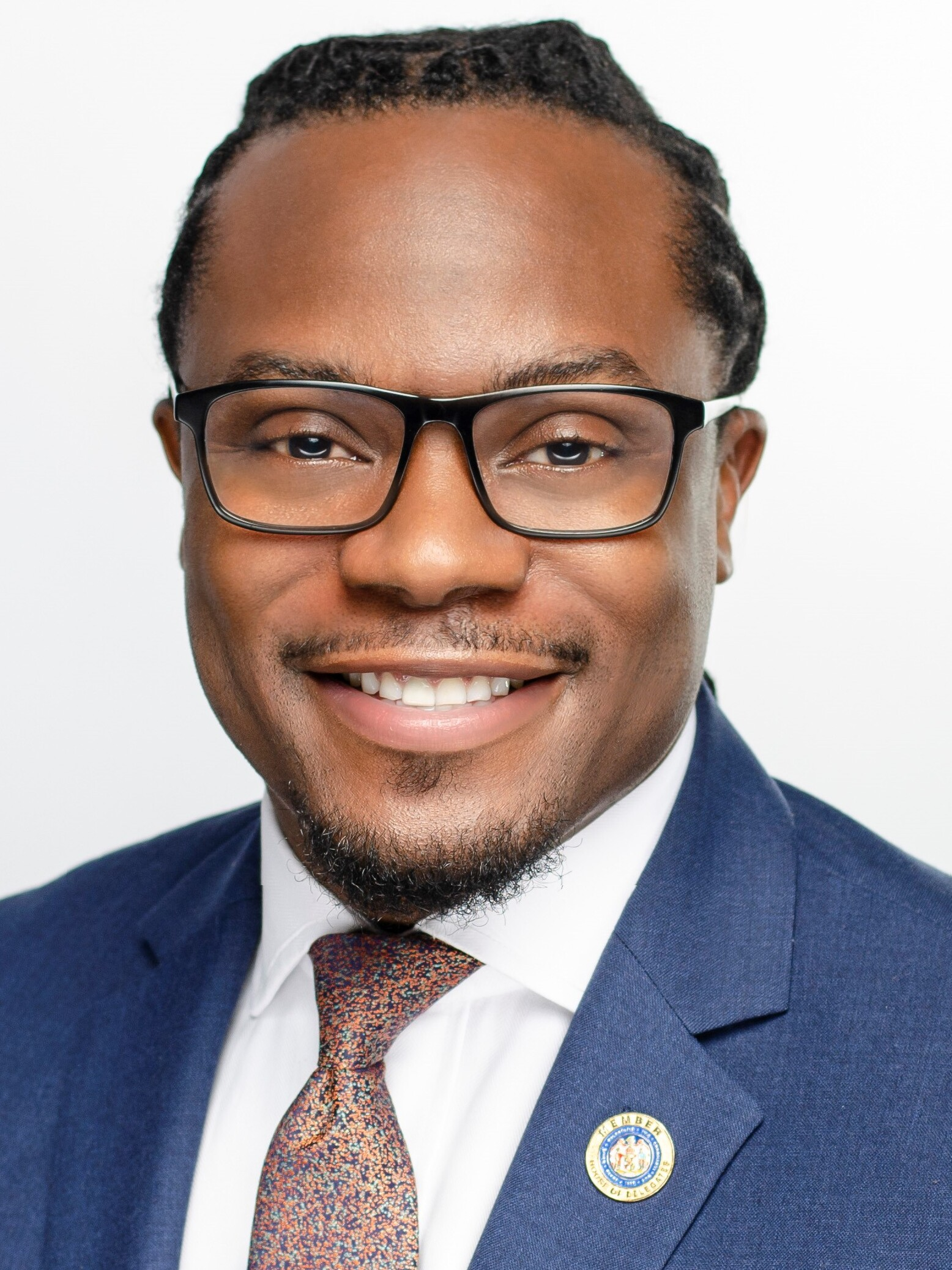
Alonzo Washington

=== Candidates ===
==== Nominee ====
- Aisha Braveboy, Prince George's County State's Attorney (2018–present) and candidate for attorney general of Maryland in 2014

==== Eliminated in primary ====
- Rushern Baker, former county executive (2010–2018) and candidate for governor in 2018 and 2022
- Marcellus Crews, tech executive and candidate for U.S. Senate in 2024
- Calvin Hawkins, at-large county councilmember (2018–2025)
- Ron Hunt, radio personality
- Albert Slocum, financial professional
- Moisette Tonya Sweat, attorney and candidate for county executive in 2022
- Alonzo Washington, state senator from the 22nd district (2023–present)

==== Withdrawn ====
- Jolene Ivey, chair of the Prince George's County Council (2023–2025) (remained on ballot)

==== Declined ====
- Dereck Davis, Maryland State Treasurer (2021–present) and former state delegate from the 25th district (1995–2021) (endorsed Baker)
- Thomas Dernoga, county councilmember from the 1st district (2002–2010, 2018–present)
- Tara Jackson, acting county executive (2024–present)
- Eric Olson, county councilmember from the 3rd district (2006–2014, 2022–present) (endorsed Ivey)
- Ingrid Watson, county councilmember from the 4th district (2022–present)

=== Endorsements ===
Rushern Baker

State cabinet members

- Dereck Davis, Maryland State Treasurer (2021–present)

County officials

- Sydney Harrison, county councilor from the 9th district (2018–present)

Labor unions

- Fraternal Order of Police Local 30, 89, and 112
- International Association of Fire Fighters Local 1619
Aisha Braveboy

U.S. representatives

- David Trone, MD-06 (2019–2025)

Statewide elected officials

- Wes Moore, Governor of Maryland (2023–present)

State legislators

- Marvin E. Holmes Jr., HD-23 (2003–present)
- Mary A. Lehman, HD-21 (2019–present)
- C. Anthony Muse, SD-26 (2007–2019, 2023–present) and candidate for county executive in 2018
- Joseline Peña-Melnyk, HD-21 (2007–present)
- Ron Watson, SD-23 (2021–present)

County officials

- Wala Blegay, county councilor from the 6th district (2022–present)
- Edward Burroughs III, vice-chair of Prince George's County Council (2024–present) from the 8th district (2022–present)
- Krystal Oriadha, county councilor from the 7th district (2022–present)

Labor unions

- American Federation of State, County and Municipal Employees Maryland Council 3
- Eastern Atlantic States Regional Council of Carpenters
- Laborers' International Union of North America
- Metropolitan Washington Council AFL-CIO
- International Union of Painters and Allied Trades District Council 51

Organizations

- Our Revolution
- Working Families Party
Calvin Hawkins

U.S. senators

- Angela Alsobrooks, Maryland (2025–present)

U.S. representatives

- Albert Wynn, Maryland's 4th congressional district (1993–2008)

State legislators

- Nick Charles, SD-25 (2023–present)

Party officials

- Terry Lierman, former chair of the Maryland Democratic Party (2004–2007)
Moisette Tonya Sweat

Organizations

- Maryland Forward Party
Alonzo Washington

State legislators

- Ashanti Martinez, HD-22 (2023–present)
Jolene Ivey (withdrawn)

U.S. senators

- Ben Cardin, Maryland (2007–2025)

U.S. representatives

- Steny Hoyer, MD-05 (1981–present)
- Kweisi Mfume, MD-07 (2020–present)

State legislators

- Adrian Boafo, HD-23 (2023–present)
- Victor Ramirez, SD-47 (2011–2019)

County officials

- Eric Olson, county councilor from the 3rd district (2006–2014, 2022–present)

Labor unions

- American Federation of Government Employees Local 1975

=== Fundraising ===
Primary campaign finance activity through February 14, 2025
Candidate	Raised	Spent	Cash on hand
Rushern Baker (D)	$200,480	$151,497	$48,983
Aisha Braveboy (D)	$604,376	$636,629	$235,730
Calvin Hawkins (D)	$556,465	$420,036	$288,900
Ron Hunt (D)	$18,500 (Note: This amount in its entirety was self-funded by Hunt.)	$16,854	$1,646
Moisette Tonya Sweat (D)	$14,921	$7,873	$7,112
Alonzo Washington (D)	$63,478	$64,826	$64,902
Source: Maryland State Board of Elections

=== Polling ===
Hypothetical polling

Poll source	Date(s) administered	Sample size (Note: Key: A – all adults RV – registered voters LV – likely voters V – unclear)	Margin of error	Rushern Baker	Aisha Braveboy	Calvin Hawkins	Jolene Ivey	Undecided
Public Policy Polling (D) (Note: Poll commissioned by Ivey's campaign)	583 (LV)	November 8–9, 2024	–	9%	18%	4%	23%	46%

=== Results ===
Democratic primary results
Party	Candidate	Votes	%
Democratic	Aisha Braveboy	43,942	46.48%
Democratic	Rushern Baker	18,270	19.33%
Democratic	Calvin Hawkins	16,180	17.11%
Democratic	Jolene Ivey (withdrawn)	8,374	8.86%
Democratic	Alonzo Washington	4,952	5.24%
Democratic	Moisette Tonya Sweat	1,485	1.57%
Democratic	Ron Hunt	661	0.70%
Democratic	Marcellus Crews	492	0.52%
Democratic	Albert Slocum	181	0.19%
Total votes		94,537	100.0%

== Republican primary ==
=== Candidates ===
==== Nominee ====
- Jonathan White, veteran and candidate for the at-large Prince George's County Council seat in 2022 and 2024

==== Eliminated in primary ====
- George McDermott, perennial candidate
- Jesse Peed, nominee for SD-23 in 2022

=== Fundraising ===
Primary campaign finance activity through February 14, 2025
Candidate	Raised	Spent	Cash on hand
George McDermott (R)	$100	$0	$100
Jesse Peed (R)	$100	$0	$625
Jonathan White (R)	<$1,000	<$1,000	N/A
Source: Maryland State Board of Elections

=== Results ===
Republican primary results
Party	Candidate	Votes	%
Republican	Jonathan White	1,365	37.78%
Republican	Jesse Peed	1,243	34.40%
Republican	George McDermott	1,005	27.82%
Total votes		3,613	100.0%

== General election ==
=== Post-primary endorsements ===
Aisha Braveboy (D)

County officials

- Calvin Hawkins, at-large county councilmember (2018–present)
- Jolene Ivey, at-large county councilmember (2024–present)

=== Results ===
Prince George's County Executive special election, 2025
Party	Candidate	Votes	%	±%
Democratic	Aisha Braveboy	82,062	91.18%	−7.47
Republican	Jonathan White	7,185	7.98%	N/A
Write-in		755	0.84%	−0.51
Total votes		90,002	100.00%	

== Notes ==
Partisan clients
