= Joseph M. Baumgarten =

Professor of Jewish History

Joseph M. Baumgarten (Vienna, September 7, 1928 – December 4, 2008) was an Austrian-born Semitic scholar known for his knowledge in the field of Jewish legal texts from biblical law to Mishnaic law and including the legal texts among the Dead Sea Scrolls. Baumgarten immigrated to the United States with his family in 1939 as a result of the Anschluss, Germany's occupation of Austria in 1938. In 1950, he was ordained a rabbi at Mesivta Torah Vodaath, a prominent Brooklyn yeshiva. He married Naomi Rosenberg in 1953.

Baumgarten started his studies in the field of mathematics with a B.A. cum laude from Brooklyn College. It was a chance meeting at Johns Hopkins with William Foxwell Albright that caused him to change direction, eventually being awarded a Ph.D. in Semitic studies in 1954. His dissertation was entitled "The Covenant Sect and the Essenes." From 1952 to 1957 he remained at Johns Hopkins teaching Aramaic. In 1953, he began his long association with Baltimore Hebrew College. He also took on the role of rabbi to the Bnai Jacob Congregation in 1959. Throughout his life, he was a member of the Rabbinical Council of America, a major organization of Orthodox rabbis.

Prof. Baumgarten served as visiting professor at Towson State College (now Towson University, the University of Maryland) and the University of the Negev (now Ben-Gurion University of the Negev) in Israel. He was also in residence at the Israel Institute for Advanced Studies of the Hebrew University of Jerusalem in 1990 and again in 2001. He was a fellow at the Annenberg Institute (now the Katz Center for Advanced Judaic Studies of the University of Pennsylvania) in Philadelphia in 1992–1993.

1953 saw the first of his publications on the Dead Sea Scrolls. Essays from the early period of his study were collected in 1977, Studies in Qumran Law (Leiden: Brill Publishers, 1977). His knowledge of Qumran legal matters was probably the reason why John Strugnell gave him the task of publishing the Cave 4 fragments of the Damascus Document. His work on the Damascus Document not only brought its manuscripts to publication but provided the basis for understanding it within the framework of the history of Judaism.

A festschrift was presented to him in 1995: Legal Texts and Legal Issues, Proceedings of the Second Meeting of the International Organization for Qumran Studies, Cambridge 1995, Published in Honour of Joseph M. Baumgarten, edited by M. Bernstein, F. García Martínez, J. Kampen (Leiden: Brill, 1997).

== Publications ==
His publications include:

- Law in the Dead Sea Scrolls, (Routledge – an imprint of Taylor & Francis Books Ltd, 2005) ISBN 0-415-19651-5
- Qumran Cave 4 Vol. XIII: The Damascus Document (4Q266–273), editor with Jozef T. Milik, Stephen Pfann, Ada Yardeni (Oxford: OUP, 1997) ISBN 0-19-826396-1
- Qumran Cave 4 Vol. XXXV: Halakhic Texts, editor with Torleif Elgvin, Esther Eshel, Erik Larson, Manfred R. Lehmann (Oxford: OUP, 2000) ISBN 0-19-827006-2
