= Lewis Kaplan (disambiguation) =

Lewis Kaplan may refer to:

- Lewis Kaplan, violinist
- Lewis A. Kaplan, American judge

== See also ==
- Louis Kaplan (disambiguation)
