= Eli Velder =

American academic (1925–2020)

- Born: Eli Yehill Velder; November 9, 1925; Baltimore, Maryland, U.S.
- Died: April 6, 2020 (aged 94)
- Children: 4

Academic background
- Education: Johns Hopkins University (BA, PhD); Baltimore Hebrew University (DipEd)
- Thesis: The teaching of the Bible in the Jewish schools of Europe during the fifteenth and sixteenth centuries (1952)

Academic work
- Discipline: Education
- Institutions: Goucher College

Eli Yehill Velder (November 9, 1925 – April 6, 2020) was an American academic. He held the endowed Dean Van Meter Alumnae Professorship of history and philosophy of education at Goucher College. Velder founded the education program at Goucher, where he was associated for almost 62 years. He taught courses on history, the philosophy of education, and teaching disadvantaged youths.

== Early life and education ==
Velder was born on November 9, 1925, and raised in an observant Jewish family in Baltimore. His parents were Rose and Abraham Velder. Velder earned a B.A. (1948) and Ph.D. (1952) from Johns Hopkins University. Velder taught at Baltimore Hebrew University (BHU) while completing his doctoral studies. His mentor, the president of the BHU, recommended Velder consider a career in education and the history of education. Velder later completed his doctoral studies in this area. His dissertation was titled, The teaching of the Bible in the Jewish schools of Europe during the fifteenth and sixteenth centuries. Velder completed a teaching diploma at BHU.

== Career ==
Velder began teaching at Goucher College, part-time, in 1958 at the suggestion of one of his doctoral committee members. He transitioned to full-time by 1963. Velder taught courses on history, the philosophy of education, and teaching disadvantaged youths. He was the founder of the education program at Goucher. In 1985, Velder was named the endowed Dean Van Meter Alumnae Professorship of history and philosophy of education. He was chair of the education department from 1980 to 1990, director of the M.Ed. program from 1991 to 1993, and director of the graduate programs in education. In the early 1990s, at the suggestion of president Rhoda Dorsey, Velder worked with the Goucher dance therapy program to combine pedagogical expertise at Goucher with the psychological expertise at Sheppard and Enoch Pratt Hospital. Velder was associated with Goucher for nearly 62 years. He was later professor emeritus of education.

Velder published articles and served on statewide committees on education. He was a visiting professor at University of Exeter and a guest lecturer at Odessa University.

== Personal life ==
Velder died on April 6, 2020. He had a daughter and a son. Velder was predeceased by his first wife, Jane Velder (née Kasper) and his second wife, Zahava Velder (née Brand).

== Awards and honors ==
Velder received the Goucher College award for outstanding teaching in 1979. In 1986, he received the Goucher award for service to the college. Velder was presented a doctor of Hebrew letters, honoris causa, in 2000 from Baltimore Hebrew University.
