= Carmen Hooker Odom =

American legislator

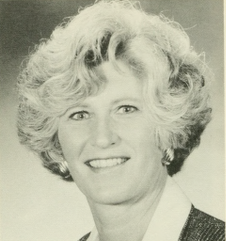

Secretary of the North Carolina Department of Health and Human Services
- In office January 2001 – May 2007
- Governor: Mike Easley
- Preceded by: H. David Bruton
- Succeeded by: Dempsey Benton

Member of the Massachusetts House of Representatives from the 2nd Franklin district
- In office 1985–1993
- Preceded by: William D. Benson
- Succeeded by: John Merrigan

Personal details
- Born: Carmen Anne DeFrates; February 3, 1945 (age 81) New Brunswick, New Jersey
- Spouse(s): Lawrence Highland Buell (m. 1966; div. 1989); Michael Hooker (m. 1993; died 1999); T. L. "Fountain" Odom (m. 2002; died 2023)
- Children: 2
- Education: Lower Merion High School; Springfield College; UMass Amherst

Carmen Hooker Odom (born Carmen Anne DeFrates; February 3, 1945), previously known as Carmen Buell, Carmen D. Buell, and Carmen Hooker Buell, is the former secretary of the North Carolina Department of Health and Human Services. Governor Mike Easley appointed her Secretary in January 2001. Odom, a former Massachusetts legislator and health care lobbyist, has spent her professional life working in health and human services. As a lawmaker, she was the primary legislative author of both the 1991 Massachusetts comprehensive health reform legislation and the Children's Medical Security Plan, which targeted young children not covered by medical insurance.

== Early life and career ==
Born in New Brunswick, New Jersey, and raised in suburban Philadelphia, Pennsylvania, Hooker Odom is one of two children born to Carmen (née Ingersoll) and Dr. Joseph DeFrates. She attended Lower Merion High School in Ardmore, Pennsylvania, and graduated from Springfield College in 1966 with a bachelor's degree in sociology and political science. Hooker Odom went on to receive a master's degree in regional planning from the University of Massachusetts Amherst in 1984.

After completing her education, Hooker Odom was elected to the Massachusetts House of Representatives representing the 2nd Franklin district. She would be elected to six consecutive terms from 1985 to 1993, the final three of which were spent as Chair of the House Health Care Committee.

Prior to her appointment as head of the large state bureaucracy, she served as Vice President of Government Relations for Quintiles Transnational Corporation in Research Triangle Park. Hooker Odom served as the Group Vice President for Carolinas Healthcare System, now Atrium Health. She is also an adjunct professor at the UNC School of Public Health.

In May 2007, Hooker Odom announced that she would resign as Secretary to become president of the Milbank Memorial Fund. In March 2013 she stepped down as President of the fund, she then became advisor to the President. She served in that role from March 2013 to 2014. She is now a self employed independent consultant.

== Personal life ==
On June 25, 1966, Hooker Odom and Lawrence Highland Buell were married at The Narberth Methodist Church in Narberth, Pennsylvania. The marriage produced two children, in 1967 and 1971, and ended in divorce in 1989.

In December, 1993 Hooker Odom married University of Massachusetts President Michael Hooker in a ceremony in Leyden, Massachusetts. In 1995, Hooker Buell accompanied her husband to North Carolina when he was named Chancellor of that state's Chapel Hill-hosted flagship school. In 1999, Hooker, aged 53, died following a 6-month-long battle with non-Hodgkins lymphoma.

On January 19, 2002, one year after becoming reacquainted at North Carolina governor Mike Easley's inauguration, Hooker Odom was married for a third time to former state Senator Thomas LaFontine "Fountain" Odom.

On November 28, 2023, Hooker Odom was widowed once again when her husband, aged 85, passed away after a lengthy illness. As of that date, both Hooker Odom and each of her two daughters continued to reside in North Carolina.

== See also ==
- 1991–1992 Massachusetts legislature
- Milbank Memorial Fund
