= Aisha Braveboy =

American politician and attorney

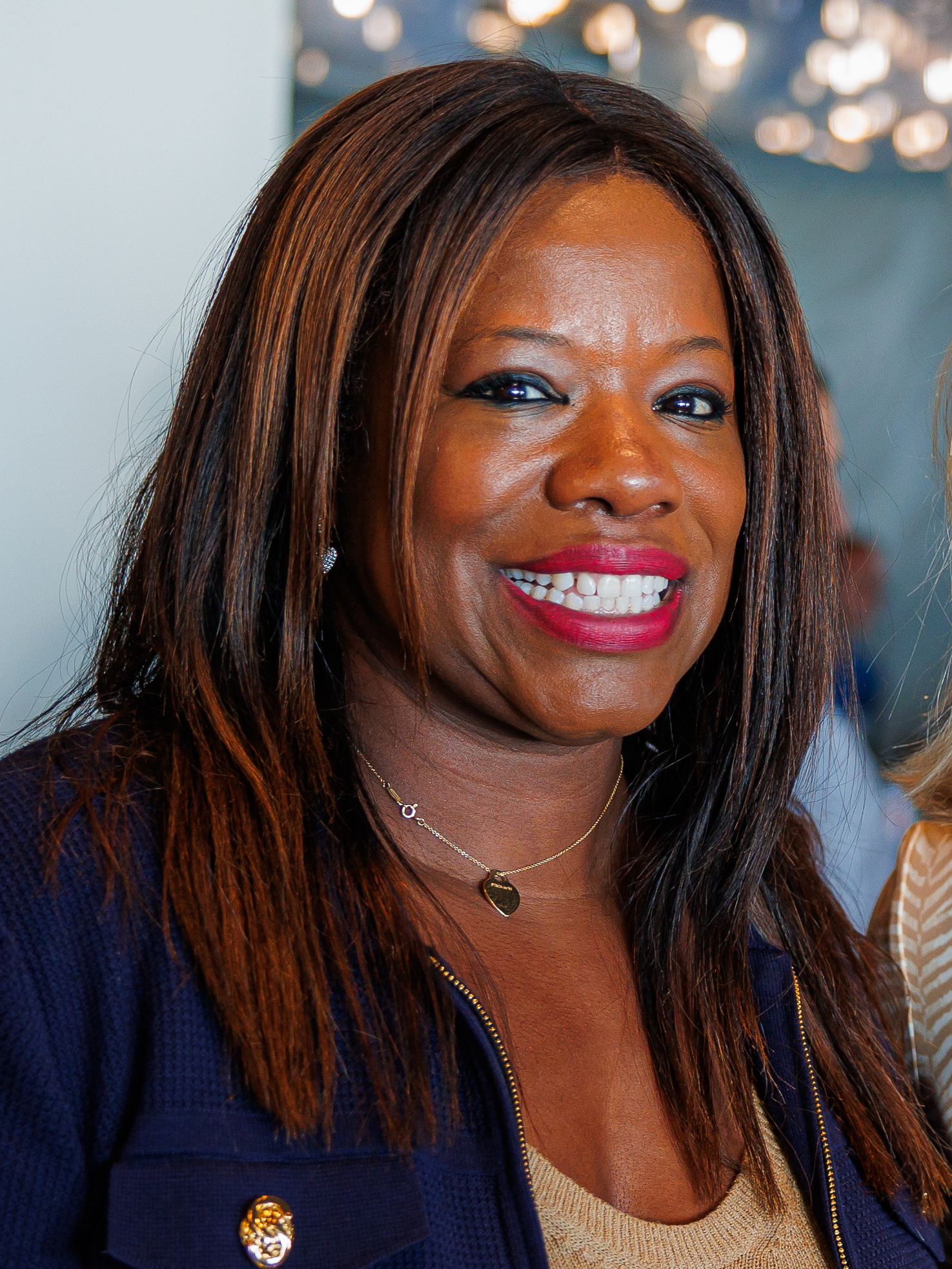
- Braveboy in 2024

9th Executive of Prince George's County
- Incumbent
- Assumed office June 18, 2025
- Preceded by: Tara Jackson (acting)

State's Attorney of Prince George's County
- In office December 3, 2018 – June 18, 2025; Acting: December 3, 2018 – January 7, 2019
- Preceded by: Angela Alsobrooks
- Succeeded by: Tara Jackson (acting)

Member of the Maryland House of Delegates from the 25th district
- In office January 10, 2007 – January 14, 2015
- Preceded by: Anthony Brown
- Succeeded by: Angela Angel; Darryl Barnes

Personal details
- Born: July 29, 1974 (age 52) Washington, D.C., U.S.
- Party: Democratic
- Education: University of Maryland, College Park (BA); Howard University (JD)
- Website: Campaign website

Aisha Nazapa Braveboy (born July 29, 1974) is an American politician who has served as the county executive of Prince George's County, Maryland since 2025. A member of the Democratic Party, she was the state's attorney of Prince George's County from 2018 to 2025, and a member of the Maryland House of Delegates from the 25th district from 2007 to 2015.

Braveboy unsuccessfully ran for attorney general of Maryland in 2014, losing to state senator Brian Frosh in the Democratic primary. In 2025, following the election of Prince George's County Executive Angela Alsobrooks to the U.S. Senate, Braveboy successfully ran to fill the remainder of Alsobrooks's term as county executive. She was subsequently elected to a full four-year term in 2026.

== Early life and education ==
Braveboy was born in Washington, D.C., to father Cuthbert and mother Norma Braveboy, who migrated to the United States from Saint Patrick Parish, Grenada. She graduated from Largo High School and later attended the University of Maryland, College Park, where she earned a bachelor of art degree in government and politics in 1997. Afterwards, Braveboy earned her Juris Doctor degree from the Howard University School of Law in 2000.

After graduating, Braveboy became an associate with Bowie, Maryland law firm Gabriel J. Christian & Associates. From 2000 to 2002, she worked as an attorney for the Wireless Telecommunications Bureau of the Federal Communications Commission.

== Political career ==
Braveboy first got involved in politics in 2002, when she worked on the county executive campaign of Jack B. Johnson. From 2003 to 2005, she worked as an advisor to Prince George's County officials. Afterwards, Braveboy worked in the Office of Central Services, where she managed properties owned or leased by the county.

In 2003, Braveboy started the Community Public Awareness Council nonprofit, which sought to provide mental health services and workshops to first-time juvenile offenders and their families to reduce truancy.

=== Maryland House of Delegates ===
In 2006, Braveboy ran for the Maryland House of Delegates in District 25, seeking to succeed state delegate Anthony Brown, who ran for Lieutenant Governor of Maryland. Braveboy was sworn into the office on January 10, 2007. During her tenure, she supported legislation to reduce mass incarceration and domestic violence, and to protect homeowners from deceptive lenders.

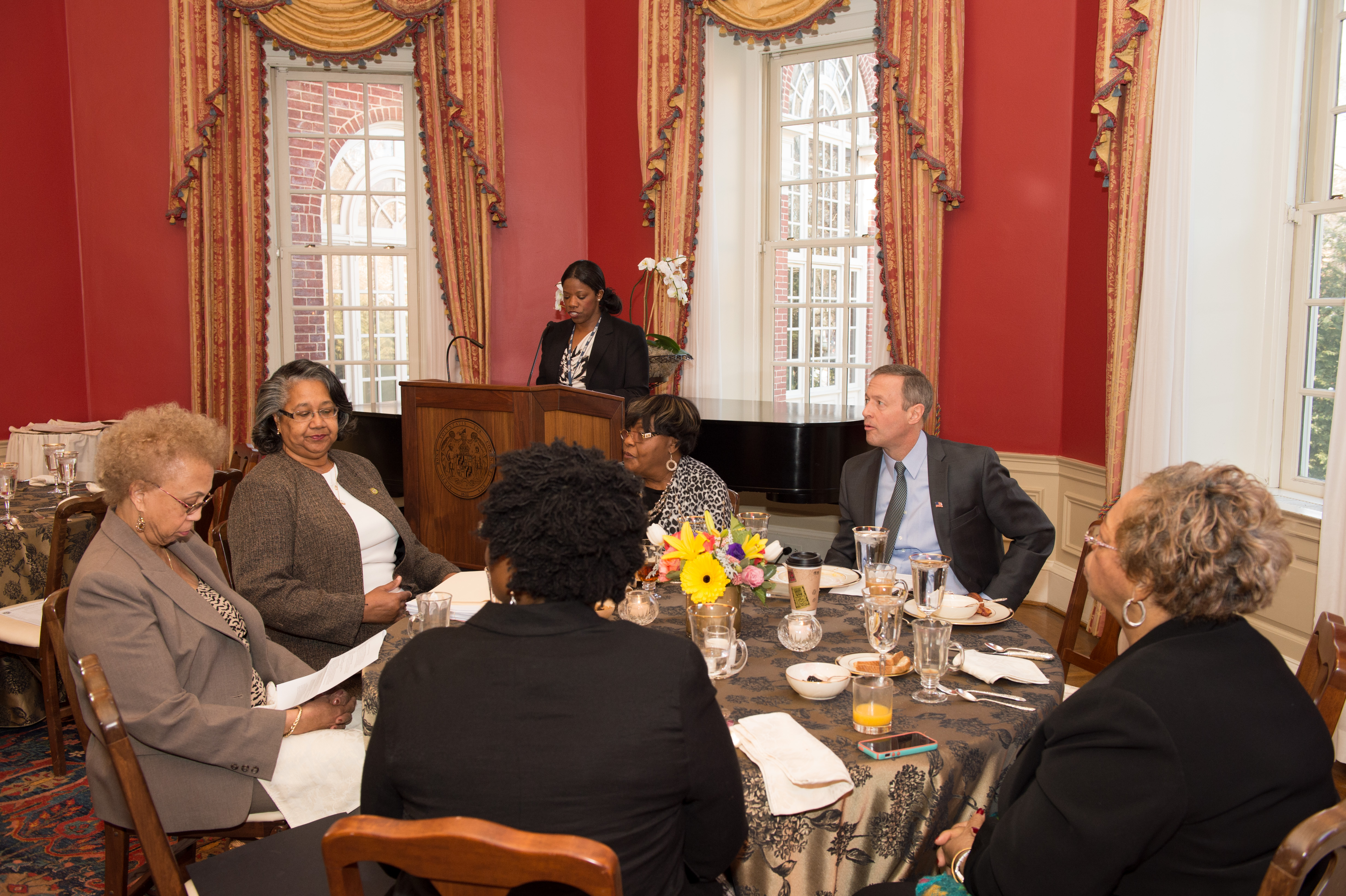
Braveboy (at podium) was the chair of the Legislative Black Caucus of Maryland from 2012 to 2014.

Braveboy was a member of the Economic Matters Committee during her entire tenure, including as the chair of its consumer protection and commercial law subcommittee from 2011 to 2015. She was also a member of the Prince George's County Delegation and Legislative Black Caucus of Maryland. She served as the caucus's chair from 2012 to 2014, during which she advocated for increased funding for historically black colleges and universities and opposed legislation setting mandatory minimum sentences.

=== 2014 Attorney General campaign ===
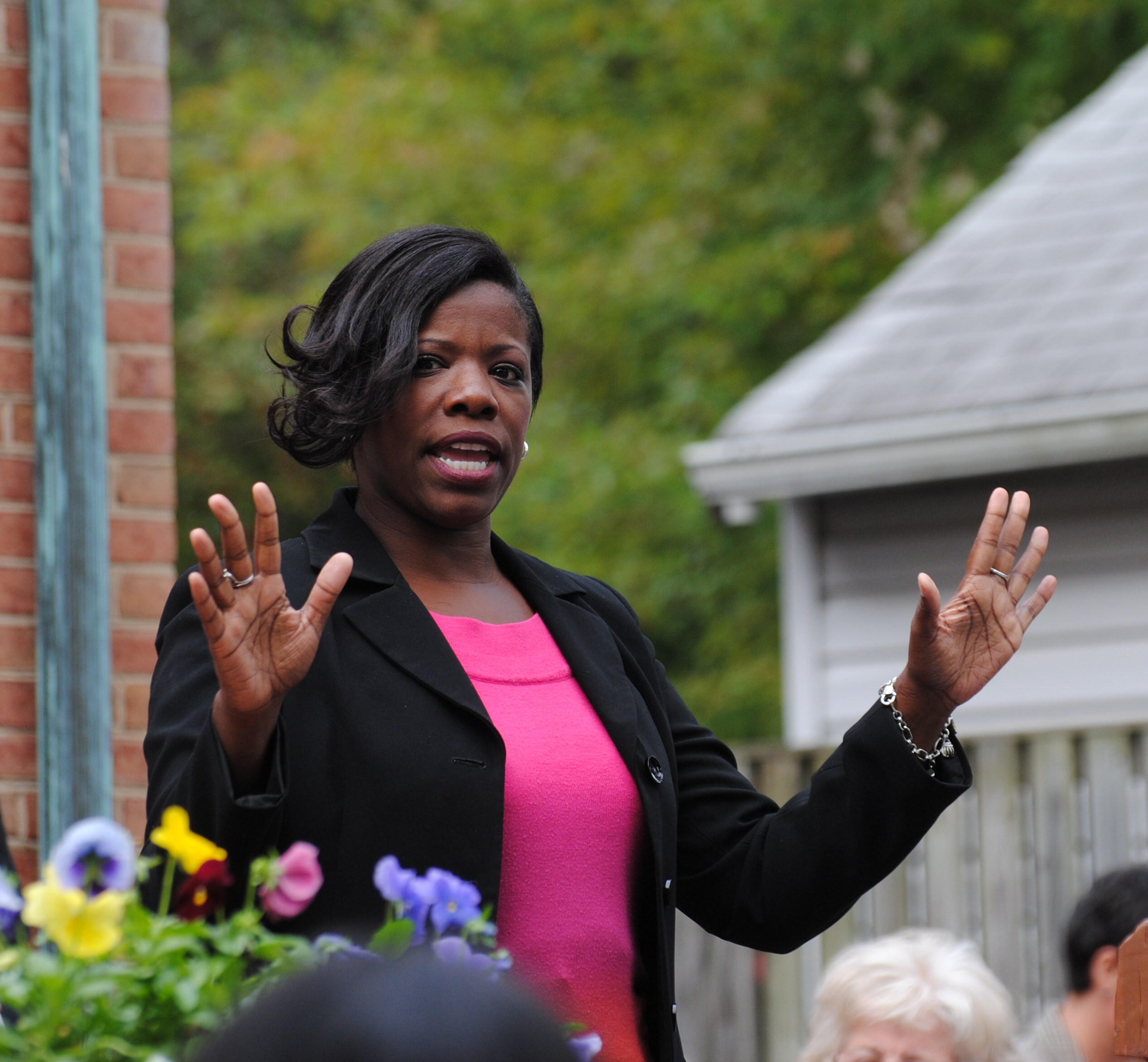
Braveboy campaigning in 2013

On September 19, 2013, Braveboy filed to run for Attorney General of Maryland. Her platform included supporting the state's historically black colleges and universities, opposing the death penalty, and fighting against large polluters.

During the Democratic primary, her campaign received endorsements from various labor unions, including the Washington D.C. Building and Construction Trades Council and International Association of Fire Fighters Local 1619.

Braveboy was defeated by state senator Brian Frosh in the Democratic primary on June 24, 2014, placing last with 20.1 percent of the vote. If elected, she would have been Maryland's first African American attorney general. Following her defeat, Braveboy worked as a lobbyist for the Children's National Health System and the Innovations Group LLC until 2018.

=== Prince George's State's Attorney ===
==== Elections ====
On November 9, 2017, Braveboy announced her candidacy for state's attorney of Prince George's County. She ran on a progressive platform that included prosecuting domestic violence, expanding county diversion programs, and prosecuting repeat violent offenders. Braveboy led the Democratic primary in endorsements, which included the Prince George's County Fraternal Order of Police, correctional officers union, and various labor unions. She won the Democratic primary on June 26, 2018, receiving 62.8 percent of the vote, and ran unopposed in the general election.

Braveboy ran for reelection unopposed in 2022.

==== Tenure ====
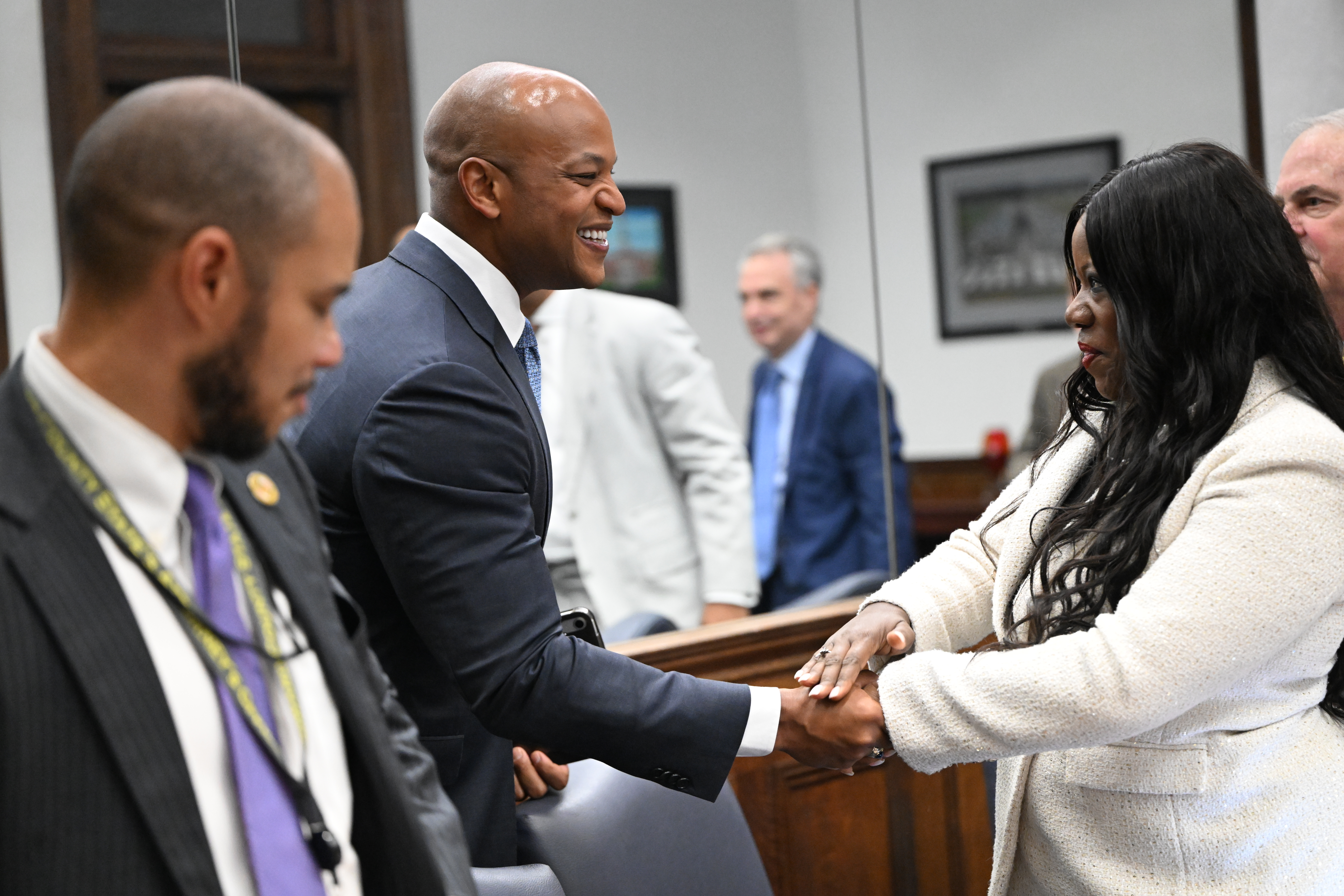
Braveboy shakes hands with Governor Wes Moore, 2024

Braveboy was sworn in as state's attorney on January 7, 2019. Upon being sworn in, she named juvenile justice reform and crackdowns on illegal guns as her top priorities while in office.

In 2019, Braveboy created the state's first conviction and sentencing integrity unit to weigh new consideration for county convictions and sentencings, which led to the release of seven people sentenced to life as juveniles. Later that year, she announced that the county would no longer recommend cash bail as a condition of release, instead requesting alternatives including counseling, drug testing, and mental health evaluations.

In March 2020, after Prince George's County recorded its first case of COVID-19, Braveboy sought the release of 150 pretrial defendants to reduce the spread of the virus.

During the 2020 legislative session, Braveboy supported legislation to make strangulation a first-degree felony assault and another bill to allow prosecutors to pursue hate crime charges for acts "motivated in part" by hate. In October 2020, she launched an initiative to support victims of domestic violence and strangulation.

In May 2021, following a national spike in carjackings, Braveboy launched a task force to increase awareness and prevention of carjackings in Prince George's County, which collaborated with community organizers to host community-focused events and broadcast commercials targeting young people. She also worked with U.S. Attorney Erek Barron to prosecute carjackings. In August 2021, Braveboy endorsed efforts encouraging the Biden administration to create a task form to reform the justice system to be less punitive and more equitable.

=== Prince George's County Executive ===
==== Elections ====
===== 2025 =====
In November 2024, after county executive Angela Alsobrooks won the 2024 United States Senate election in Maryland, Braveboy said that she would run to succeed Alsobrooks as county executive. After Alsobrooks resigned on December 2, 2024, Braveboy formally announced her candidacy in the 2025 Prince George's County executive special election. Her campaign was endorsed by Governor Wes Moore. She placed first in the Democratic primary election with 46.5% of the vote and defeated Republican nominee Jonathan White in the general election on June 3, 2025, with 91.2% of the vote.

===== 2026 =====
Braveboy ran for a full four-year term as county executive in 2026. She faced token opposition in the Democratic primary election, which she won on June 23, 2026, and ran unopposed in the general election after Independent candidate Tonya Sweat was disqualified by the Prince George's County Board of Elections for not having gathered enough signatures.

==== Tenure ====
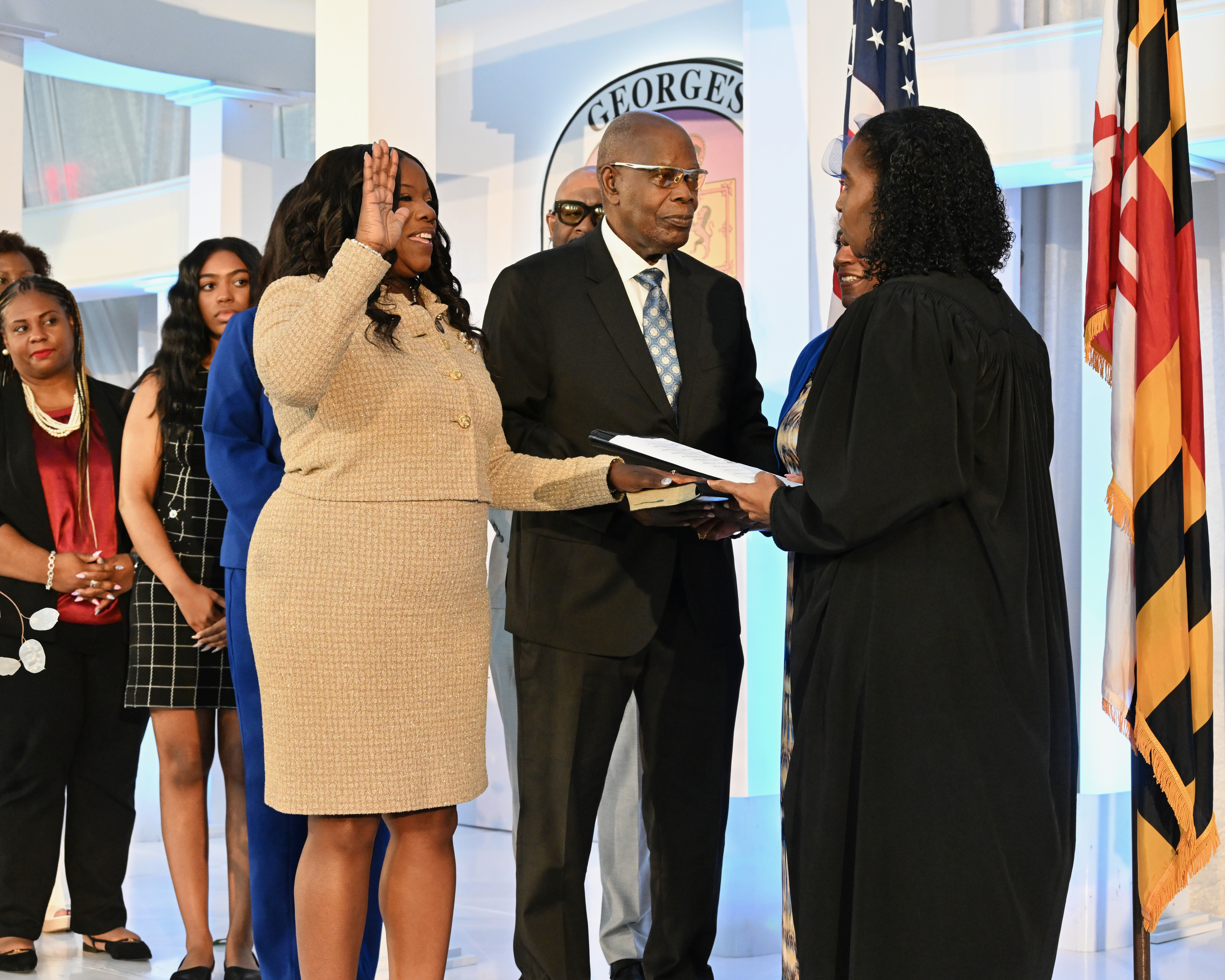
Braveboy being sworn in as county executive, 2025

Braveboy was sworn into office on June 18, 2025, a day ahead of a public swearing-in ceremony.

== Political positions ==
=== Criminal justice ===
In 2013, Braveboy introduced a bill to remove the check box that asks if applicants have a criminal record from hiring applications for state jobs. The bill passed and was signed into law by Governor Martin O'Malley. She also voted in favor of legislation to repeal the death penalty, which passed the House of Delegates by a 82–56 vote.

In June 2020, after the American Civil Liberties Union released a 92-page partially redacted report detailing discriminatory actions taken by the Prince George's County Police Department that prompted the resignation of Chief Hank Stawinski, Braveboy called for increased police transparency and sought greater access to police officer records.

In September 2020, Braveboy said she opposed ceding the ability to prosecute police officers to an independent body, and lobbied against efforts to pass a bill doing so during the 2021 legislative session. In 2021, she testified in support of the Maryland Police Accountability Act of 2021, a police transparency and accountability reform package. In October 2021, she released the county's "do-not-call" list of 57 officers with credibility issues.

In 2021, Braveboy said she supported legislation to end life sentences without parole for juveniles.

During the 2023 legislative session, Braveboy said she supported legislation to establish a "safe harbor" to protect minors who are victims of trafficking.

During the 2024 legislative session, Braveboy supported legislation to extend probationary periods for gun crimes committed by juveniles, limit the Child Interrogation Protection Act, and allow state's attorneys to file a motion to modify an incarcerated individual's sentence "at any time".

=== Education ===
During the 2012 legislative session, Braveboy introduced legislation to require students to stay in school until they turn 18 years old, which passed and was signed into law by Governor Martin O'Malley. She also opposed shifting the state's $239 million teacher pension system to counties.

=== Environment ===
In 2012 and 2013, Braveboy opposed bills to levy a five cent tax on disposable bags.

=== Gun control ===
In April 2013, Braveboy voted for the Firearm Safety Act of 2013, a gun control reform package.

In May 2021, Braveboy launched the "Our Streets, Our Future" campaign to promote gun violence prevention efforts in Prince George's County through community engagement, employment services, and social media advertisements targeted toward young people.

In 2022, Braveboy said she supported a bill to ban privately made firearms in Maryland.

=== Housing ===
During the 2014 legislative session, Braveboy testified in support of a bill that would ban deficiency judgments and place a six-month moratorium on foreclosures.

=== Minimum wage ===
In 2013, Braveboy introduced legislation to raise the state minimum wage to $10.10 per hour by 2015. In 2014, she voted for a bill to raise the minimum wage to $10.10 an hour by 2017.

=== Redistricting ===
During the 2010 redistricting cycle, Braveboy supported efforts to create a third minority-majority congressional district. She later voted against the state's redistricting plan, which she said "dilutes minority votes by breaking them up into several districts".

In 2014, Braveboy said she supported the Open Our Democracy Act, which would require states to use independent redistricting commissions to draw federal and state districts.

During the 2026 legislative session, Braveboy testified in support of a congressional redistricting plan proposed by the Governor's Redistricting Advisory Commission, which would improve the Democratic Party's chances of winning in Maryland's 1st congressional district, the only congressional seat held by Republicans in the state.

=== Social issues ===
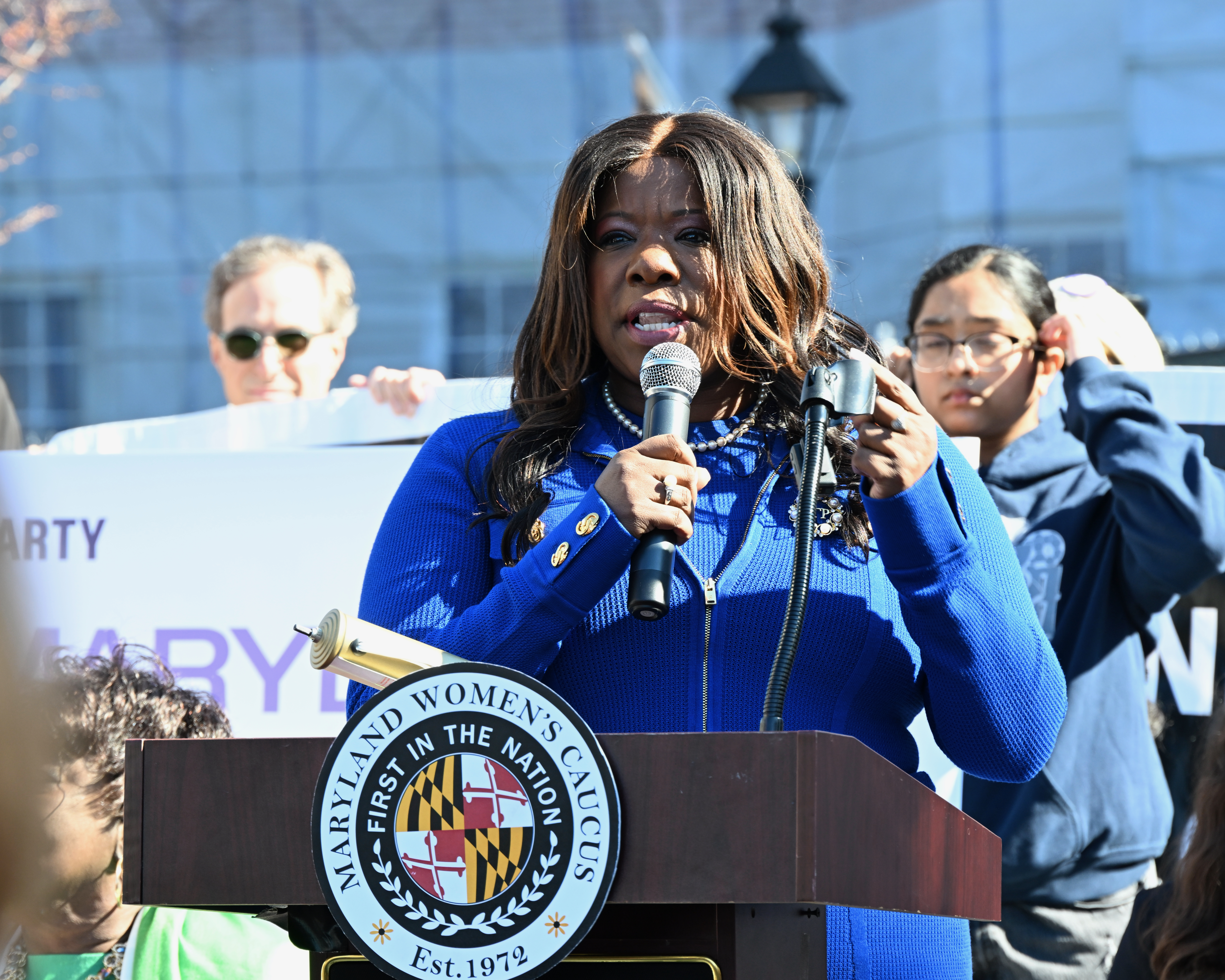
Braveboy speaks at an Equal Rights Amendment rally, 2024

In 2008, Braveboy voted against bills that would give domestic partners hospital visitation and medical decision-making rights in emergency situations. In 2011, during debate on the Civil Marriage Protection Act, which she voted against, Braveboy introduced an amendment that would block the bill from going into effect unless it was approved in a statewide referendum. Her amendment was criticized by supporters of same-sex marriage rights as a delay tactic, but she later defended her amendment as a way to gauge public opinion. In 2014, Braveboy voted for legislation to ban discrimination against transgender individuals.

In 2011, Braveboy abstained from voting on a bill to prohibit Prince George's County officials from taking contributions from developers with development proposals in the county, saying that she would prefer a statewide ban on such contributions.

During the 2012 legislative session, Braveboy introduced a bill to repeal a law that gave presiding religious denominations the legal authority to seize properties of local congregations.

In November 2012, Braveboy spoke against Question 4, a ballot referendum that sought to repeal Maryland's Dream Act, a bill that would extend in-state tuition for undocumented immigrants.

In 2014, Braveboy said she supported a bill to decriminalize simple marijuana possession in Maryland.

In July 2022, following the U.S. Supreme Court's ruling in Dobbs v. Jackson Women's Health Organization, which repealed Roe v. Wade, Braveboy said she would not cooperate with extradition requests for individuals who travel across state lines to get an abortion.

=== Taxes ===
In 2013, Braveboy voted against a bill to index the state's gas tax to inflation to fund the state's transportation budget.

== Electoral history ==
Maryland House of Delegates District 25 Democratic primary election, 2006
Party	Candidate	Votes	%
Democratic	Melony G. Griffith (incumbent)	7,745	20.9
Democratic	Dereck E. Davis (incumbent)	7,365	19.8
Democratic	Aisha Braveboy	5,841	15.7
Democratic	James L. Walls	5,170	13.9
Democratic	Shirley P. Thompson	5,000	13.5
Democratic	Sharrarne Morton	3,882	10.5
Democratic	Robert J. Barnes	2,110	5.7

Maryland House of Delegates District 25 election, 2006
Party	Candidate	Votes	%
Democratic	Aisha Braveboy	22,632	32.6
Democratic	Melony G. Griffith (incumbent)	21,584	31.1
Democratic	Dereck E. Davis (incumbent)	21,540	31.1
Republican	Patrick A. Schaeffer Jr.	2,541	3.7
Green	David Kiasi	999	1.4
Write-in		62	0.1

Maryland House of Delegates District 25 election, 2010
Party	Candidate	Votes	%
Democratic	Aisha Braveboy (incumbent)	27,804	35.3
Democratic	Dereck E. Davis (incumbent)	25,723	32.6
Democratic	Melony G. Griffith (incumbent)	25,095	31.8
Write-in		173	0.2

Maryland Attorney General Democratic primary election, 2014
Party	Candidate	Votes	%
Democratic	Brian Frosh	228,360	49.6
Democratic	Jon S. Cardin	139,582	30.3
Democratic	Aisha Braveboy	92,664	20.1

Prince George's County State's Attorney Democratic primary election, 2018
Party	Candidate	Votes	%
Democratic	Aisha Braveboy	78,320	62.8
Democratic	Victor R. Ramirez	33,653	27.0
Democratic	D. Michael Lyles	12,680	10.2

Prince George's County State's Attorney election, 2018
Party	Candidate	Votes	%
Democratic	Aisha Braveboy	285,741	98.7
Write-in		3,674	1.3

Prince George's County State's Attorney election, 2022
Party	Candidate	Votes	%
Democratic	Aisha Braveboy	216,017	99.1
Write-in		1,896	0.9

Prince George's County Executive Democratic special primary election, 2025
Party	Candidate	Votes	%
Democratic	Aisha Braveboy	43,942	46.48%
Democratic	Rushern Baker	18,270	19.33%
Democratic	Calvin Hawkins	16,180	17.11%
Democratic	Jolene Ivey (withdrawn)	8,374	8.86%
Democratic	Alonzo Washington	4,952	5.24%
Democratic	Moisette Tonya Sweat	1,485	1.57%
Democratic	Ron Hunt	661	0.70%
Democratic	Marcellus Crews	492	0.52%
Democratic	Albert Slocum	181	0.19%
Total votes		94,537	100.0%

Prince George's County Executive special election, 2025
Party	Candidate	Votes	%	±%
Democratic	Aisha Braveboy	82,062	91.18%	−7.47
Republican	Jonathan White	7,185	7.98%	N/A
Write-in		755	0.84%	−0.51
Total votes		90,002	100.00%	

Legal offices
Preceded by Angela Alsobrooks	State's Attorney for Prince George's County, Maryland; 2018–2025	Succeeded by Tara Jackson; Acting
Political offices
Preceded by Tara Jackson; Acting	Executive of Prince George's County; 2025–present	Incumbent
