= Tara Jackson =

American lawyer and politician

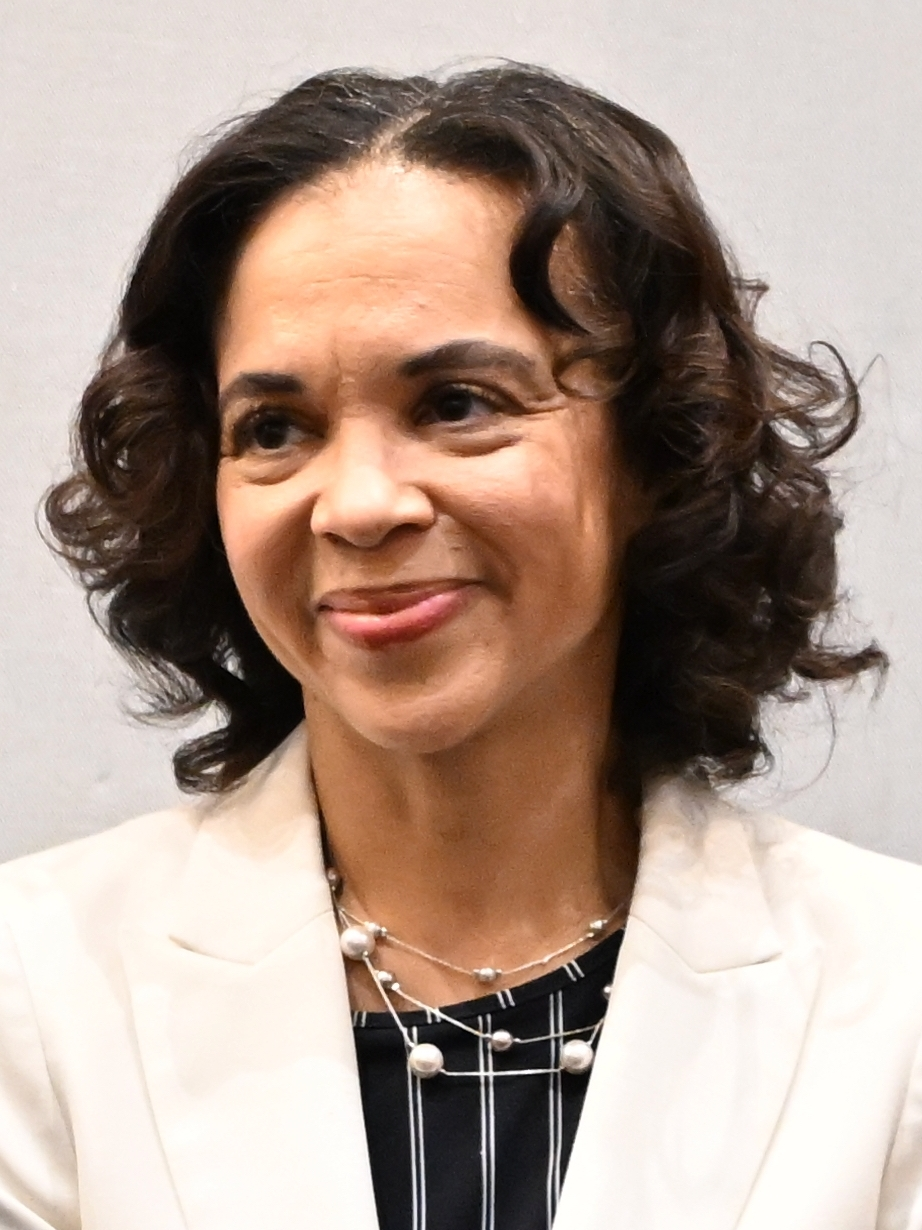
- Jackson in 2025

State's Attorney of Prince George's County
- Acting
- Assumed office June 18, 2025
- Preceded by: Aisha Braveboy

Executive of Prince George's County
- Acting
- In office December 2, 2024 – June 18, 2025
- Preceded by: Angela Alsobrooks
- Succeeded by: Aisha Braveboy

Personal details
- Party: Democratic
- Children: 1
- Education: James Madison University (BS); University of Maryland, Baltimore (JD); Phoenix Seminary (MDiv)

Tara H. Jackson is an American lawyer and politician serving as the acting state's attorney of Prince George's County, Maryland since 2025. She previously served the county as its acting county executive from 2024 to 2025, and as chief administrative officer and as the deputy county attorney for government operations under county executive Angela Alsobrooks.

== Education ==
Tara H. Jackson earned a Bachelor of Science (B.S.) degree from James Madison University. She pursued further studies at the University of Maryland Francis King Carey School of Law, where she obtained a J.D. Later, she completed a Master of Divinity in Leadership Development at the Phoenix Seminary.

== Career ==
Tara H. Jackson began her career in public service as a line prosecutor in the Maryland State's Attorney's Office, where she was tasked with making discretionary decisions in criminal cases. She then spent eight years in private practice handling criminal, civil, and administrative cases. Returning to public service, Jackson served as principal deputy state's attorney in Prince George's County, Maryland, focusing on administrative responsibilities and leadership.

Jackson later became deputy county attorney for government operations, providing legal counsel to government agencies within the county. She subsequently moved to the Office of the County Executive as deputy chief administrative officer (DCAO) for government operations in 2018, overseeing multiple departments and playing a key role in streamlining county operations.

In December 2020, Jackson was appointed by county executive Angela Alsobrooks as the chief administrative officer (CAO) for Prince George's County, replacing Major F. Riddick. During her tenure as CAO, she led the county's transition to remote work during the COVID-19 pandemic in Maryland, established vaccination centers, and managed federal relief funds. Her responsibilities included guiding the county's fiscal policies and developing annual budgets.

On December 2, 2024, Jackson became acting county executive following Alsobrooks' resignation to serve in the U.S. Senate. As acting county executive, Jackson has emphasized maintaining government stability and addressing the county’s financial challenges, including a projected $150 million budget deficit. She also highlighted priorities such as healthcare funding and ensuring efficient snow removal and waste management.

Jackson publicly stated she did not intend to seek election for the permanent county executive role and viewed her tenure as a transitional period. In June 2025, after state's attorney Aisha Braveboy was elected as county executive, Jackson was selected by the county's circuit court judges to be acting state's attorney of Prince George's County. In October 2025, she announced that she would run for election to a full four-year term as state's attorney in 2026. She won the Democratic primary election on June 23, 2026, defeating county councilmember Wanika B. Fisher with 53 percent of the vote.

== Personal life ==
Jackson is married to Lawrence Paul Jackson II, and they have one son. She is a member of the First Baptist Church in Upper Marlboro, Maryland and affiliated with Delta Sigma Theta. Additionally, she serves on the board of directors of the Foundation Schools and is part of the character committee of the United States Court of Appeals for the Fourth Circuit.

Political offices
Preceded by Angela Alsobrooks	Executive of Prince George's County; Acting; 2024–2025	Succeeded by Aisha Braveboy
Legal offices
Preceded by Aisha Braveboy	State's Attorney for Prince George's County; Acting; 2025–present	Incumbent
