= Albin O. Kuhn Library & Gallery =

Official library of the University of Maryland, Baltimore County

Albin Owings Kuhn Library & Gallery

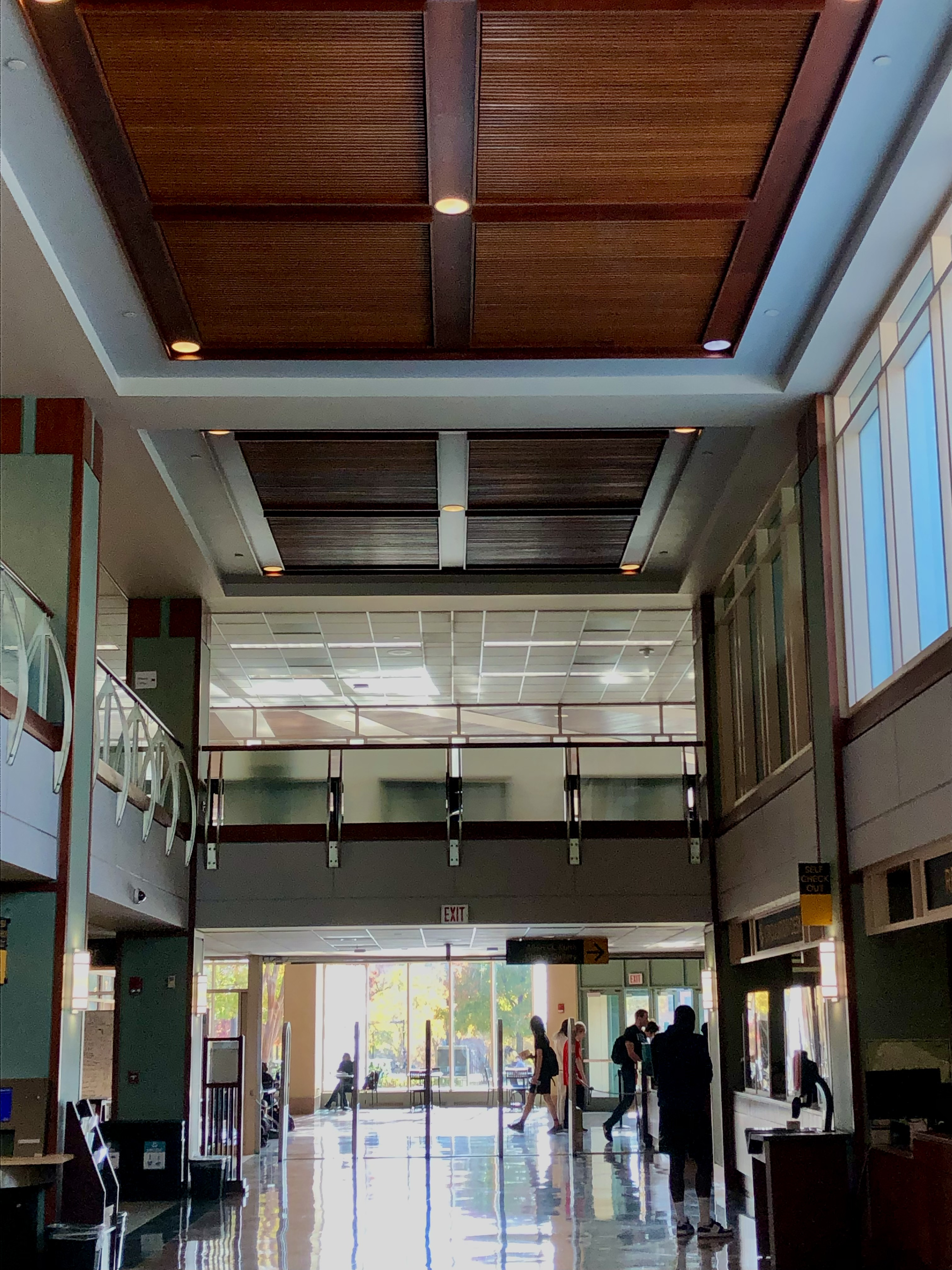
- 39°15′23.5″N 76°42′41.5″W
- Location: University of Maryland, Baltimore County; 1000 Hilltop Circle; Catonsville, Maryland 21250, United States
- Type: Academic library
- Established: 1968

Collection
- Size: 1.2 million volumes

Access and use
- Population served: 530,000+ per year

Other information
- Director: Patrick Jose Dawson
- Website: library.umbc.edu

The Albin O. Kuhn Library & Gallery is the main library of the University of Maryland, Baltimore County in Catonsville, Maryland. It is located in the center of the campus at the confluence of Academic Row and Walker Avenue. The library features 1 million+ books & bound journals (33,000+ current subscriptions), 1.9 million+ photographs and slides, 30,000+ sound recordings, 800,000+ microform pieces, 1,200+ linear feet of manuscripts/archives, 180,000+ government documents, and 100,000+ slides. In addition to the stacks, the Albin O. Kuhn Library also features the Library Gallery, the UMBC Special Collections, the Retriever Learning Center and Math Lab, Resources Learning Center, a cafe, and administrative offices.

== History ==
The University of Maryland, Baltimore County began construction on the first wing of the library in 1968. The new library was built across from the Library Pond on a hillside, therefore having a lower and upper floor. Over the years, the library continued to expand to accompany the growing university, beginning with the east wing constructed in 1975. The library was formally dedicated in 1982 in honor of the founding chancellor, Albin Owings Kuhn. In 1995, a $23 million project was implemented, which included a refurbishment and major addition for the library tower and main entrance.

== Special Collections ==
The UMBC Special Collections Department offers a large variety of historical documents, artifacts, photographs, film, and many other forms of media. The collections include more than 2 million photographs, including works by famous photographers Lewis Hine, Ansel Adams, Berenice Abbott, Judy Dater, Diane Arbus, Roland Freeman, David Plowden, Minor White, and many more. Additional collections include: The Edward L. Bafford Photographic Book Collection, The Azriel Rosenfeld Science Fiction Research Collection, Alternative Press Collection, The Marylandia Collection, The General Collection, The Merkle Collection, and The Needle Collection. The Special Collections Department also holds works by UMBC faculty, The Baltimore Sun, and others.

== Retriever Learning Center ==
In September 2011, UMBC opened the Retriever Learning Center (RLC) as a 24-hour study space available for students. Located on the ground floor of the library, the RLC is a secure section of the library that can only be accessed by use of one's UMBC identification card. The RLC features a designated area named the "Math Lab", a seminar room, and a vending machine area.
