= Michael Hooker =

American philosopher

8th Chancellor of the University of North Carolina at Chapel Hill
- In office 1995–1999
- Preceded by: Paul Hardin III
- Succeeded by: William Octavius McCoy (acting)

President of the University of Massachusetts System
- In office 1992–1995
- Preceded by: Joseph Duffey
- Succeeded by: William Bulger

President of the University of Maryland, Baltimore County
- In office 1986–1992
- Preceded by: John W. Dorsey
- Succeeded by: Freeman Hrabowski III

President of Bennington College
- In office 1982–1986

Personal details
- Born: August 24, 1945 Richlands, Virginia
- Died: June 29, 1999 (aged 53) Chapel Hill, North Carolina
- Spouse: Carmen DeFrates
- Children: Alexandra Hooker
- Education: University of North Carolina at Chapel Hill (BA); University of Massachusetts-Amherst (MA, PhD)
- Profession: Philosopher

Michael Kenneth Hooker (August 24, 1945 – June 29, 1999) was an American academic who served as the eighth Chancellor of the University of North Carolina at Chapel Hill, and President of University of Maryland, Baltimore County, and Bennington College.

== Early life ==
Hooker was born in 1945 in Richlands, Virginia. A son of a coal miner, Hooker was the first in his family to attend college. He chose to study philosophy at the University of North Carolina at Chapel Hill and went on to pursue his doctoral degree at the University of Massachusetts-Amherst.

== Academia ==
After receiving his Ph.D., Hooker began to teach philosophy at Harvard University and the Johns Hopkins University in Baltimore. In 1975, he became dean at Johns Hopkins University until 1982 when he moved to Vermont to become the president of Bennington College. Four years later, Hooker returned to Baltimore to become the president of the University of Maryland, Baltimore County, and then left in 1992 to become the president of the University of Massachusetts system. At UMBC, Hooker enhanced the quality of the university by attracting more students from around the state. Finally, in 1995 he became the eighth chancellor of the University of North Carolina at Chapel Hill until his death in 1999. At UNC Chapel Hill, he made computer literacy a top priority, preparing students for the technological changes of the twenty-first century.

== Death ==
Michael Hooker died from complications of non-Hodgkin's lymphoma at UNC Hospitals in Chapel Hill, North Carolina.
