= Calvin B. T. Lee =

American educator and businessman

Chancellor of the University of Maryland, Baltimore County
- In office 1971–1976
- Preceded by: Albin Owings Kuhn
- Succeeded by: Louis L. Kaplan

Acting President of Boston University
- In office 1970–1971
- Preceded by: Arland F. Christ-Janer
- Succeeded by: John Silber

Personal details
- Born: Calvin Bow Tong Lee; February 18, 1934 Chinatown, Manhattan
- Died: March 13, 1983 (aged 49) Chatham Township, New Jersey
- Education: Columbia University; New York University School of Law; New York University

Calvin Bow Tong Lee (February 18, 1934 – March 13, 1983) was an American educator and businessman who served as acting President of Boston University from 1970 to 1971 and Chancellor of the University of Maryland, Baltimore County from 1971 to 1976.

== Early life ==
Lee was born in Chinatown, Manhattan in 1934. His father died when Lee was 17, leaving him to manage the family's Chinese restaurant, which he did until the age of 24. In addition to running the restaurant, Lee attended and graduated from Columbia University and the New York University School of Law. He passed the bar in 1958 and began practicing law in Manhattan. That same year, Lee wrote his first book, Chinese Cooking for American Kitchens. He later earned a Ph.D. from New York University. In 1976, he co-authored another Chinese cookbook.

== Academic career ==
Lee began his academic career at Columbia University, where he was a professor of government and an assistant dean. He then took an administrative position at the United States Office of Education.

In 1968, Lee joined the faculty at Boston University as the Dean of the College of Liberal Arts. After President Arland F. Christ-Janer resigned on July 1, 1970, to become president of the College Entrance Examination Board, Lee was named acting president of the university. At 36, he was the youngest chief administrator of a major university in the country. During his tenure as acting president, Lee led the university through a two-day student strike, a sit-in at the administration building, numerous rallies and demonstrations, and over 100 bomb threats. Lee was interested in becoming president permanently, but the Board of Trustees instead offered the job to John Silber. After Silber succeed him, Lee became the University's executive vice president.

In 1971 he became chancellor of the University of Maryland, Baltimore County. He resigned in 1976 following a vote of no confidence from the faculty.

== Business career and death ==
Lee then served as a vice president at the Prudential Insurance Company of America. In this position he was in charge of evaluating the educational, training and developmental needs of the company's employees.

Lee died of cancer on March 13, 1983, at his home in Chatham Township, New Jersey, at the age of 49.
