= Louis L. Kaplan =

President of Baltimore Hebrew University
- In office 1930–1970

Acting Chancellor of University of Maryland, Baltimore County
- In office 1976–1977
- Preceded by: Calvin B. T. Lee
- Succeeded by: John W. Dorsey

Personal details
- Born: Louis Lionel Kaplan; December 11, 1902 Slonim, Grodno Governorate, Russian Empire
- Died: January 2, 2001 (aged 98) Owings Mills, Maryland, US
- Spouse: Etta Jenkins
- Children: Daniel Lee Kaplan; Deborah Kaplan Potts
- Education: Dropsie College (PhD); Columbia University (B.A.); American School of Oriental Research; Hebrew University of Jerusalem

Louis L. Kaplan was a known educator in the Baltimore, Maryland area, especially with his involvement in Jewish education, and the University System of Maryland. Kaplan was the president of Baltimore Hebrew University for forty years, a member of the University of Maryland Board of Regents, and the acting chancellor of the University of Maryland, Baltimore County from 1976 to 1977.

== Early life ==
Louis Lionel Kaplan (1902-2001) was born in Slonim, in the Grodno Governorate of the Russian Empire (present-day Belarus) in 1902, and was taken to the United States as a child in 1909. His family settled in Brooklyn, New York, where his father began a sweater factory. Kaplan graduated from Boys High School, and went on to earn a bachelor's degree from Columbia University in 1922, and a doctorate in humane letters from Dropsie College in Philadelphia in 1927. In addition, he studied at Hebrew University of Jerusalem from 1924 to 1925 and at the American School of Oriental Research with archaeologist William Foxwell Albright.

== Career ==
From 1930, he served as executive director of the Baltimore Board of Jewish Education. The same year, he was inaugurated as president of the Baltimore Hebrew University, which is now merged with Towson University. Kaplan was also president of the National Council for Jewish Education from 1939 to 1941, and was a member of the board of governors of Dropsie College beginning in 1940.

In 1952, Governor Theodore R. McKeldin appointed him to the University of Maryland Board of Regents, and later served as chairman for five years until stepping down in 1976. Following the Board of Regents, Kaplan served as interim chancellor of the University of Maryland, Baltimore County until the next year.

From 1975 to 1981, Louis Kaplan served as an interim rabbi at the Beth Am Synagogue in Baltimore.

== Legacy ==
In honor of Louis Kaplan, the Baltimore Hebrew University has established the Louis L. Kaplan Prize in Hebrew Literature. Moreover, the University of Maryland, Baltimore County awards the Louis L. Kaplan Scholarship to its most outstanding undergraduate student leaders.

== Notable publications ==
- A New Approach to the Teaching of the Torah (1942)
- Justice, Not Charity: A Biography of Harry Greenstein (1967)
