= Albin Owings Kuhn =

American academic

Chancellor of the University of Maryland Baltimore Campuses University of Maryland, Baltimore University of Maryland, Baltimore County
- In office 1963–1971
- Succeeded by: Calvin B. T. Lee

Personal details
- Born: January 31, 1916 Woodbine, Maryland
- Died: March 24, 2010 (aged 94) Woodbine, Maryland
- Spouse(s): Ella Elizabeth Cissel (d); Eileen Louise Weller Kuhn (m. 1995)
- Children: Phillip H. Kuhn, Joseph A. Kuhn, Roger C. Kuhn, Lois E. Kuhn, Albin O. Kuhn II
- Education: University of Maryland, College Park B.S. '38, M.A. '39, Ph.D. '48
- Profession: University Chancellor

Albin Owings Kuhn (January 31, 1916 – March 24, 2010) was a prominent figure in the University of Maryland system during the mid-twentieth century. He became the first chancellor of Baltimore Campuses in 1965, and is most notable for being the first chancellor of the University of Maryland, Baltimore County during its planning and early stages of operation. The main library, Albin O. Kuhn Library & Gallery at UMBC is named after Kuhn.

== Background ==
Albin Owings Kuhn was born on January 31, 1916, on a 215-acre farm in Woodbine, Maryland, in Carroll County. He attended elementary and high school in nearby Lisbon, Maryland. In 1934, he attended the University of Maryland, College Park majoring in Agricultural Education. Kuhn completed his bachelor's degree in 1938, and then subsequently completed his master's degree in Agronomy and Botany from College Park.

At the University of Maryland, College Park, Kuhn began teaching agronomy in 1940. During World War II he served in the U.S. Navy. From 1940 to 1946, Kuhn served in the Pacific Ocean, training personnel for amphibious landings. Upon returning to the United States, he led the Department of Agronomy at the University of Maryland, College Park from 1948 to 1955. At the same time in 1948, he completed his Ph.D. in Plant Genetics and Physiology.

== University of Maryland administration ==
Albin O. Kuhn became the university executive vice president for the College Park campus in 1958, instrumenting the planning of increasing the enrollment from 10,000 to 20,000 students. In 1965, he was named Chancellor of Baltimore Campuses, which then included the University of Maryland, Baltimore, and the planning of the new campus for the University of Maryland, Baltimore County in 1966. In addition, he became the first leader of the new campus from its founding up until 1971.

== See also ==
- University of Maryland, Baltimore County
- University of Maryland, College Park
- University of Maryland, Baltimore
