= Robert Freedman (political scientist) =

American political scientist

Dr. Robert Freedman (Robert Owen Freedman) is an American political scientist who held appointments at Baltimore Hebrew University and Johns Hopkins University.

Freedman received his BA in diplomatic history from the University of Pennsylvania and his MA and Ph.D degrees in International Relations from Columbia University.

== Books ==
- Soviet Policy Toward the Middle East Since 1970, third edition, Praeger Press, 1982
- Moscow and the Middle East: Soviet Policy Since the Invasion of Afghanistan, Cambridge University Press, 1991
- Soviet-Israeli Relations Under Gorbachev, Praeger Press, 1991.
- The Intifada: Its Impact on Israel, the Arab World, and the Superpowers, University Press of Florida, 1991
- The Middle East after Iraq's Invasion of Kuwait, University Press of Florida, 1993
- Israel in the Begin Era (1982) (edited)
- Israel Under Rabin (1995)(edited)
- The Middle East and the Peace Process (1998) (edited)
- Israel's First Fifty Years (2000) (edited)
- The Middle East Enters the 21st Century (2002) (edited)
