= John W. Dorsey =

American academic administrator (1936–2014)

Chancellor of the University of Maryland, Baltimore County
- In office 1977–1986
- Preceded by: Louis L. Kaplan
- Succeeded by: Michael Hooker

Acting Chancellor of University of Maryland, College Park
- In office 1974–1975
- Preceded by: Charles E. Bishop
- Succeeded by: Robert Gluckstern

Personal details
- Born: June 13, 1936 Hagerstown, Maryland
- Died: July 28, 2014 (aged 78) Laurel, Maryland
- Education: University of Maryland; Harvard University

John Wesley Dorsey Jr. (June 13, 1936 – July 28, 2014) served as the acting President of the University of Maryland, College Park from 1974 to 1975 and as the acting chancellor of the university from August 1974 to June 1975.

== Biography ==
Dorsey was born in Maryland in 1936 and graduated from the University of Maryland with a B.S. in economics in 1958. He continued to attend graduate school at Harvard University receiving an M.A. in 1962 and a Ph.D. in economics in 1964 and later receiving a certificate from the London School of Economics. Dorsey started teaching at College Park as an assistant professor in 1963 and became director of the Bureau of Business and Economic Research in 1966. Dorsey served as the vice chancellor for administrative affairs from 1970 to 1977, and then became the chancellor of the University of Maryland, Baltimore County. From 1986 to 1989, he was Special Assistant to the President of the university. In 1989, he returned to the Department of Economics at the University of Maryland from which he retired as an emeritus professor in 2001. Dorsey has worked as a SECU Board member since 1975, serving as chairman for four years and as Vice Chairman for six years. He died of respiratory failure on July 28, 2014.
