= Ann Corcoran (activist) =

American anti-Muslim activist

- Born: 1950 or 1951 (age 75–76)
- Education: Rutgers University (BS); Yale University (MS)
- Occupations: Blogger, activist
- Known for: Anti-refugee activism

Ann Corcoran (born 1950 or 1951) is an American conservative blogger and political activist known for the anti-refugee and anti-Muslim blogs Refugee Resettlement Watch and Fraud, Crooks, and Criminals. She has collaborated with several far-right organizations and publications.

== Education and background ==
Corcoran had her upbringing as a Democrat in a small town in central New Jersey, with an Irish father and a German mother. She has a Bachelor of Science in wildlife biology from Rutgers University and a Master of Science in environmental studies from Yale University. She worked in Washington, D.C. as a lobbyist for the National Audubon Society from 1975 to 1980. With her husband, she had two children of her own, and two adopted children from Vietnam. In 1985, the family bought and moved to a farm near Hagerstown, Maryland.

Beginning in 1989, along with other farmowners she led a six-year dispute over landowner rights against the federal government, the Park Service and the state, on how to best preserve their farms, which were associated with the Antietam National Battlefield.

Corcoran converted to Catholicism in 2002, but left the church after learning that the United States Conference of Catholic Bishops was being paid tens of millions of dollars per year for resettling Muslim refugees.

== Views and activities ==
Corcoran's focus on Muslim immigration was sparked by plans to resettle refugees in her rural county in western Maryland, and she started her blog Refugee Resettlement Watch in 2007. She has maintained that the Muslim concept of hijra (migration) is a form of jihad to take over the Western world, and warned that the greatest threat to the United States is legal Muslim immigration. She has stated that "Mohammed told his followers to migrate and spread Islam, in order to dominate all the lands of the world ... and that's exactly what they're doing now."

According to Religion News Service, the blog "spurred a large movement to ban Muslim refugees in particular, claiming they wanted to impose Shariah law in the U.S," which "eventually morphed into a broader anti-immigrant movement that came to view faith groups that aid immigrants or refugees with suspicion." A Republican, Corcoran has appeared in interviews on Fox News, and been a member of the Tea Party movement. She has collaborated with Frank Gaffney and the Center for Security Policy (CSP), and ACT for America, and been considered a part of the counter-jihad movement. She has also been associated with white nationalist publications such as VDARE, Social Contract Press and American Renaissance. In 2015, she was cited as an "expert" by Donald Trump, who was given a copy of her book, Refugee Resettlement and the Hijra to America, at a CSP national security summit in Iowa where the two briefly met.

In 2017, a YouTube video of Corcoran produced by the CSP went viral, receiving nearly 3 million views, in which she claimed that refugees are a Muslim plot to colonize the United States, asserting that the United Nations High Commissioner for Refugees is "under the influence of a powerful Muslim supremacist group", the Organisation of Islamic Cooperation (OIC). She has also regularly focused her writings on the United States Refugee Admissions Program.

Corcoran has been accused by the Anti-Defamation League and others of promoting anti-Muslim conspiracy theories. Her description of hijra as an Islamic doctrine of immigration has previously been seen in the book Modern Day Trojan Horse: The Islamic Doctrine of Immigration by Sam Solomon and Elias Al Maqdisi.

== Bibliography ==
- Corcoran, Ann (2015). Refugee Resettlement and the Hijra to America. Center for Security Policy Press. ISBN 978-1508820703.
