= Baltimore Hebrew University =

Former college in Baltimore, Maryland, US

- Motto: Securing a vibrant American Jewish future.
- Type: Private
- Active: 1919–2009
- President: Dr. David Ariel
- Undergraduates: 20
- Postgraduates: 100
- Location: Baltimore, Maryland, United States
- Campus: Urban

Baltimore Hebrew University was founded as Baltimore Hebrew College and Teachers Training School in 1919 to promote Jewish scholarship and academic excellence. It was the only institution of higher learning in Maryland devoted solely to all aspects of Judaic and Hebraic studies. Located in the northwest, Park Heights neighborhood of Baltimore, BHU conferred degrees up to the doctorate level. Though small in size, with classes having between 8 and 25 students, it had strong ties to the community and to several other local colleges and universities.

Baltimore Hebrew University merged with Towson University, officially becoming the Baltimore Hebrew Institute, in 2009. The entire BHU library is now housed at TU's Albert S. Cook Library, including special collections of rare books, Yizkor books, a collection of items related to Jewish cultural reconstruction, and testimonies from survivors of the Holocaust. The BHU building on Park Heights Avenue was demolished in October 2009.

== Notable faculty and alumni ==
- Robert Freedman
- Jon S. Cardin
- Joseph M. Baumgarten
- Barry Freundel
- Steven Fine
- Jacob Mann
- Eli Velder

== See also ==
- List of Jewish universities and colleges in the United States
