= Maryland state senate delegations =

Members of the Maryland state senate

The Maryland Senate is the upper house of the Maryland General Assembly, the bicameral state legislature of the U.S. State of Maryland. The Senate comprises 47 elected members from 47 single-member senatorial districts in the state. The Maryland General Assembly is considered one of the oldest continually operating legislative bodies in the United States.

== 2023-2027 Delegates ==
2023-2027 Delegates
District	County	Delegate(s)	Party
1A	Alleghany and Garrett	James C. Hinebaugh, Jr.	Republican
1B	Alleghany	Jason C. Buckel	Republican
1C	Alleghany and Washington	Terry L. Baker	Republican
2A	Frederick and Washington	William M. Valentine, William J. Wivell	Republican
2B	Washington	Brooke Grossman	Democrat
3	Frederick	Kristopher G. Fair, Kenneth P. Kerr, Karen Simpson	Democrat
4	Frederick	Barrie S. Ciliberti, April Fleming Miller, Jesse T. Pippy	Republican
5	Carroll and Frederick	Christopher Eric Bouchat, April R. Rose, Christopher L. Tomlinson	Republican
6	Baltimore	Robin L. Grammer Jr., Robert B. Long, Richard W. Metzgar	Republican
7A	Baltimore	Ryan M. Nawrocki, Kathy Szeliga	Republican
7B	Harford	Lauren C. Arikan	Republican
8	Baltimore	Nick Allen, Harry Bhandari, Carl W. Jackson	Democrat
9A	Howard and Montgomery	Chao Wu, Natalie C. Ziegler	Democrat
9B	Howard	Courtney Watson	Democrat
10	Baltimore	Jennifer White Holland, Adrienne A. Jones, N. Scott Phillips	Democrat
11A	Baltimore	Cheryl E. Pasteur	Democrat
11B	Baltimore	Jon S. Cardin, Dana M. Stein	Democrat
12A	Howard	Jessica M. Feldmark, Terri L. Hill	Democrat
12B	Anne Arundel	Gary Simmons	Democrat
13	Howard	Vanessa E. Atterbeary, Pamela Lanman Guzzone, Jennifer R. Terrasa	Democrat
14	Montgomery	Anne R. Kaiser, Bernice D. Mireku-North, Pamela E. Queen	Democrat
15	Montgomery	Linda K. Foley, David Fraser-Hidalgo, Lily Qi	Democrat
16	Montgomery	Marc A. Korman, Sara N. Love, Sarah S. Wolek	Democrat
17	Montgomery	Julie Palakovich Carr, Ryan S. Spiegel, Joseph Vogel	Democrat
18	Montgomery	Aaron M. Kaufman, Emily K. Shetty, Jared Solomon	Democrat
19	Montgomery	Charlotte A. Crutchfield, Bonnie L. Cullison, Vaughn M. Stewart III	Democrat
20	Montgomery	Lorig Charkoudian, David H. Moon, Jheanelle K. Wilkins	Democrat
21	Anne Arundel and Prince George's	Benjamin S. Barnes, Mary A. Lehman, Joseline A. Peña-Melnyk	Democrat
22	Prince George's	Anne M. Healey, Ashanti F. Martinez, Nicole A. Williams	Democrat
23	Prince George's	Adrian A. Boafo, Marvin E. Holmes, Jr., Kym Taylor	Democrat
24	Prince George's	Tiffany T. Alston, Andrea Fletcher Harrison, Jazz M. Lewis	Democrat
25	Prince George's	Kent Roberson, Denise Roberts, Karen R. Toles	Democrat
26	Prince George's	Veronica L. Turner, Kriselda Valderrama, Jamila J. Woods	Democrat
27A	Charles and Prince George's	Kevin M. Harris	Democrat
27B	Calvert and Prince George's	Jeffrie E. Long Jr.	Democrat
27C	Calvert	Mark N. Fisher	Republican
28	Charles	Debra M. Davis, Edith J. Patterson, C. T. Wilson	Democrat
29A	St. Mary's	Matt Morgan	Republican
29B	St. Mary's	Brian M. Cosby	Democrat
29C	Calvert and St. Mary's	Todd B. Morgan	Republican
30A	Anne Arundel	Shaneka T. Henson, Dana C. Jones	Democrat
30B	Anne Arundel	Seth A. Howard	Republican
31	Anne Arundel	Brian A. Chisholm, Nicholaus R. Kipke, Rachel P. Muñoz	Republican
32	Anne Arundel	J. Sandy Bartlett, Mark S. Chang, Michael J. Rogers	Democrat
33A	Anne Arundel	Andrew C. Pruski	Democrat
33B	Anne Arundel	Stuart M. Schmidt Jr.	Republican
33C	Anne Arundel	Heather A. Bagnall	Democrat
34A	Harford	Andre V. Johnson Jr., Steven C. Johnson	Democrat
34B	Harford	Susan K. McComas	Republican
35A	Cecil and Harford	Michael Griffith, Teresa E. Reilly	Republican
35B	Cecil	Kevin B. Hornberger	Republican
36	Caroline, Cecil, Kent, and Queen Anne's	Steven J. Arentz, Jefferson L. Ghrist, Jay A. Jacobs	Republican
37A	Dorcester and Wicomico	Sheree Sample-Hughes	Democrat
37B	Caroline, Dorchester, Talbot and Wicomico	Christopher T. Adams, Thomas S. Hutchinson	Republican
38A	Somerset, Wicomico, and Worcester	Charles J. Otto	Republican
38B	Wicomico	Carl L. Anderton Jr.	Republican
38C	Wicomico and Worcester	Wayne A. Hartman	Republican
39	Montgomery	Gabriel Acevero, Lesley J. Lopez, W. Gregory Wims	Democrat
40	Baltimore City	Marlon D. Amprey, Frank M. Conaway Jr., Melissa R. Wells	Democrat
41	Baltimore City	Dalya Attar, Samuel L. Rosenberg, Malcolm P. Ruff	Democrat
42A	Baltimore	Nino Mangione	Republican
42B	Baltimore	Michele J. Guyton	Democrat
42C	Carroll	Joshua J. Stonko	Republican
43A	Baltimore City	Regina T. Boyce, Elizabeth M. Embry	Democrat
43B	Baltimore	Catherine M. Forbes	Democrat
44A	Baltimore	Eric D. Ebersole	Democrat
44B	Baltimore	Aletheia R. McCaskill, Sheila S. Ruth	Democrat
45	Baltimore City	Jacqueline T. Addison, Stephanie M. Smith, Caylin A. Young	Democrat
46	Baltimore City	Luke H. Clippinger, Mark Edelson, Robbyn T. Lewis	Democrat
47A	Prince George's	Diana M. Fennell, R. Julian Ivey	Democrat
47B	Prince George's	Deni L. Taveras	Democrat
