= Denise Roberts (politician) =

American politician (born 1973)

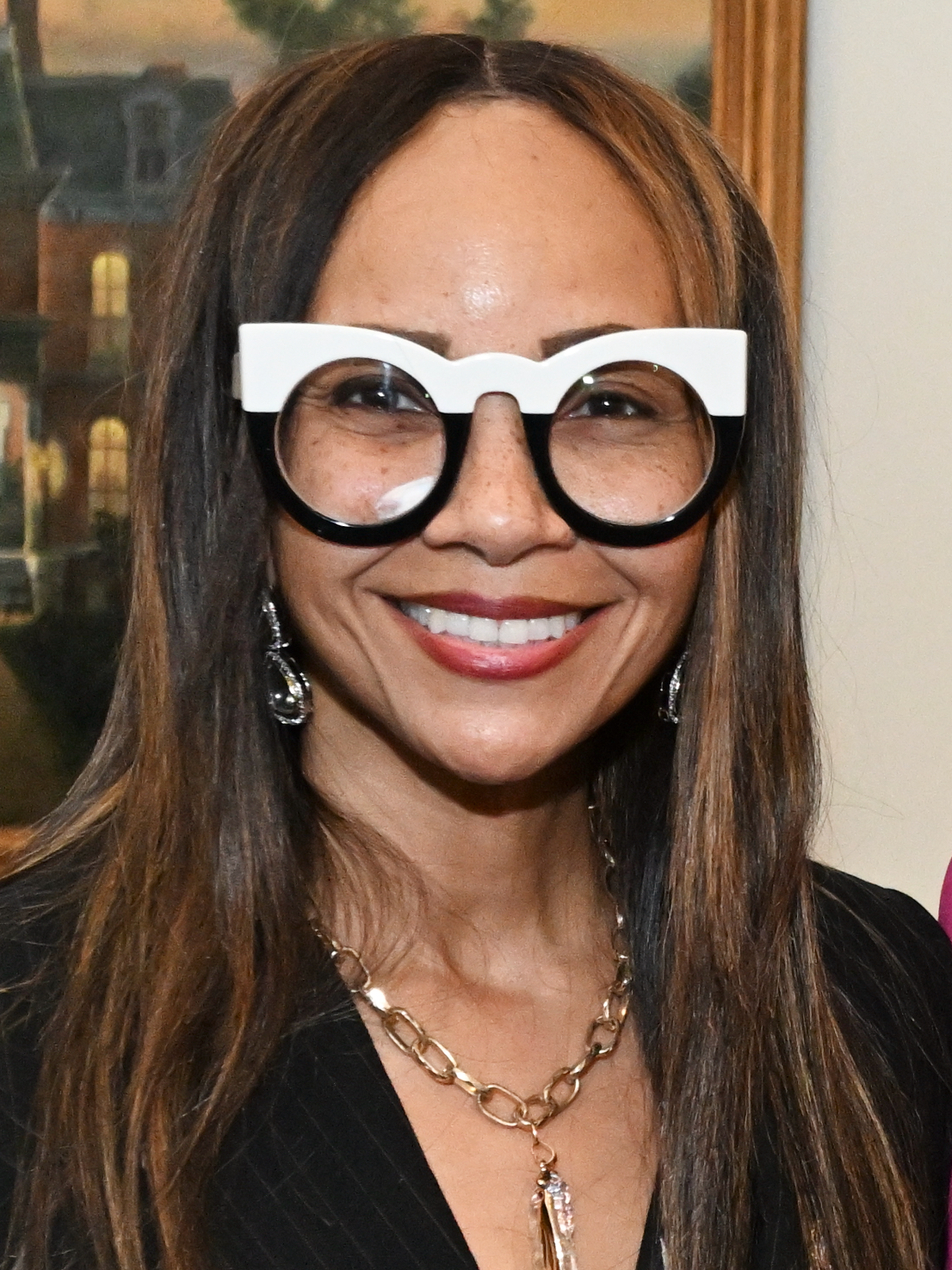
- Roberts in 2024

Member of the Maryland House of Delegates from the 25th district
- Incumbent
- Assumed office January 8, 2024 Serving with Kent Roberson and Karen Toles
- Appointed by: Wes Moore
- Preceded by: Nick Charles

Personal details
- Born: September 4, 1973 (age 52) Cheverly, Maryland, U.S.
- Party: Democratic
- Children: 2
- Education: Howard University (BA); American University (MA)
- Website: Campaign website

Denise Roberts (born September 4, 1973) is an American politician who has served as a member of the Maryland House of Delegates representing District 25 since 2024.

== Background ==
Roberts was born in Cheverly, Maryland on September 4, 1973. She graduated from Suitland High School before attending Howard University, where she earned a Bachelor of Arts degree in radio, television, and film in 1995, and American University, where she earned a Master of Arts degree in public relations, advertising, and communications in 2002.

Roberts has run her own photography business, D. Geneva Photography, since 2002, and has worked as a television host for Prince George's Community Television's Level Up since 2014. She was also involved with advocating for local small businesses, served as vice president of her local parent-teacher-student organization, and in leadership of a local coffee club within the Prince George's County Police Department.

Roberts previously worked as a spokesperson for Prince George's County Executive Jack B. Johnson from 2005 to 2009. In 2018, she unsuccessfully ran for Clerk of the Circuit Court in Prince George's County, placing second with 30.7 percent of the vote behind Mahasin El Amin. Following her defeat, Roberts worked as the communications director for Prince George's County State's Attorney Aisha Braveboy. In 2022, she ran for the Prince George's County Council in District 6, placing second with 27.6 percent of the vote behind Wala Blegay.

== In the legislature ==
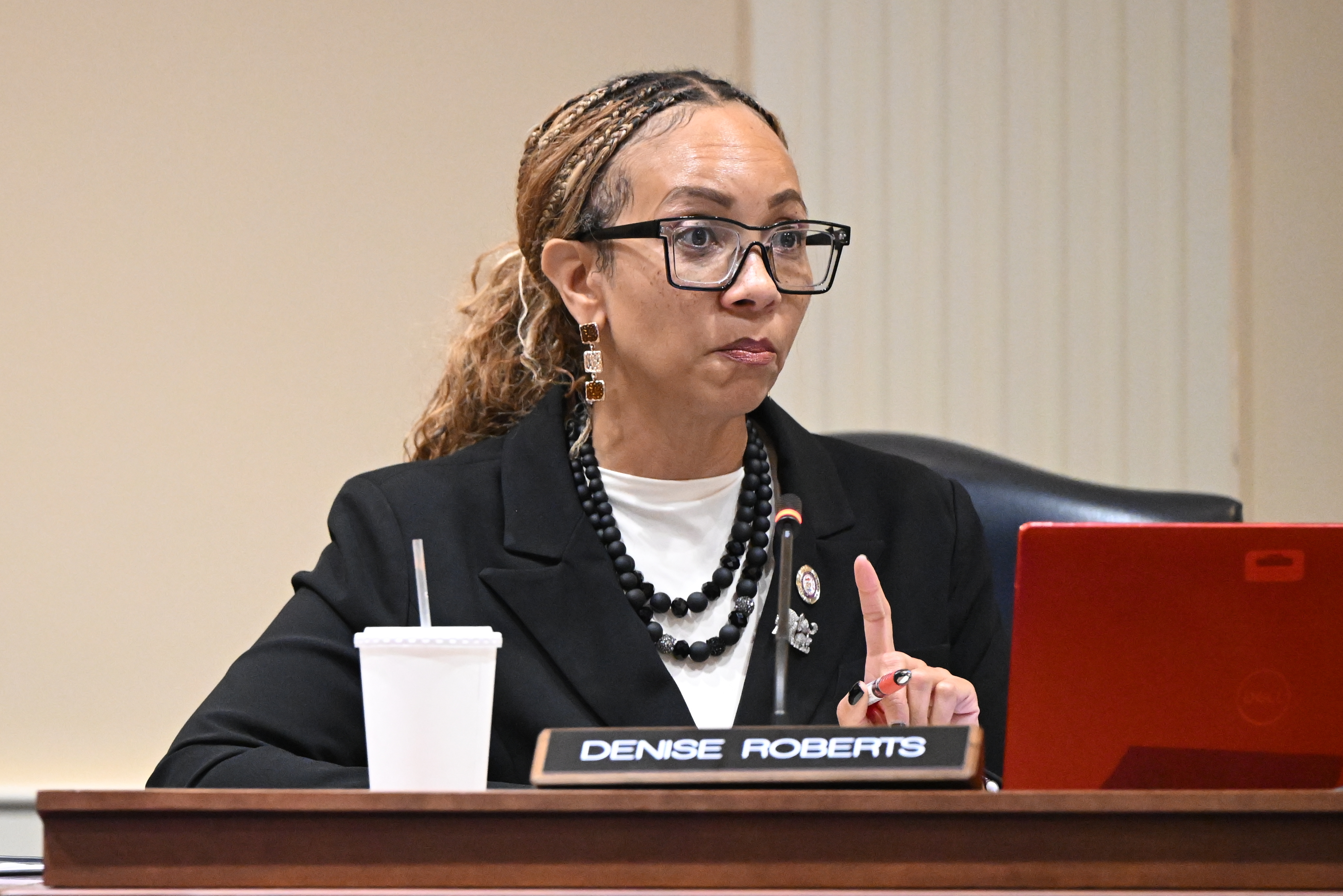
Roberts in the House Ways and Means Committee, 2025

In December 2023, following the appointment of state delegate Nick Charles to the Maryland Senate, Roberts applied to serve the remainder of Charles' term in the Maryland House of Delegates. Her nomination was backed by Charles and state delegate Karen Toles. The Prince George's County Democratic Central Committee voted to nominate her to the seat later that month. She was sworn in on January 8, 2024.

During the 2025 legislative session she sponsored a bill, along with Marvin E. Holmes Jr., Nick Allen, Linda Foley, Wayne A. Hartman, and Regina T. Boyce, revising the 2023 mandate for funding of reserve studies and preparation of funding plans by housing cooperatives, condominiums, and homeowners associations.

== Personal life ==
Roberts has two children.

== Electoral history ==
Prince George's County Clerk of the Circuit Court Democratic primary election, 2018
Party	Candidate	Votes	%
Democratic	Mahasin El Amin	39,497	34.1
Democratic	Denise Roberts	35,465	30.7
Democratic	Adrion Jackson Howell	13,868	12.0
Democratic	Gloria McClam-Magruder	11,465	9.9
Democratic	Adrian Orlando Mason	8,374	7.2
Democratic	Bonita Maria Rabalais	6,994	6.0

Prince George's County Council District 6 Democratic primary election, 2022
Party	Candidate	Votes	%
Democratic	Wala Blegay	7,270	33.1
Democratic	Denise G. Smith	6,067	27.6
Democratic	Barbara Holt Streeter	4,129	18.8
Democratic	Nakia R. Wright	2,877	13.1
Democratic	Belinda Queen	1,650	7.5
