= Regina T. Boyce =

American politician (born 1976)

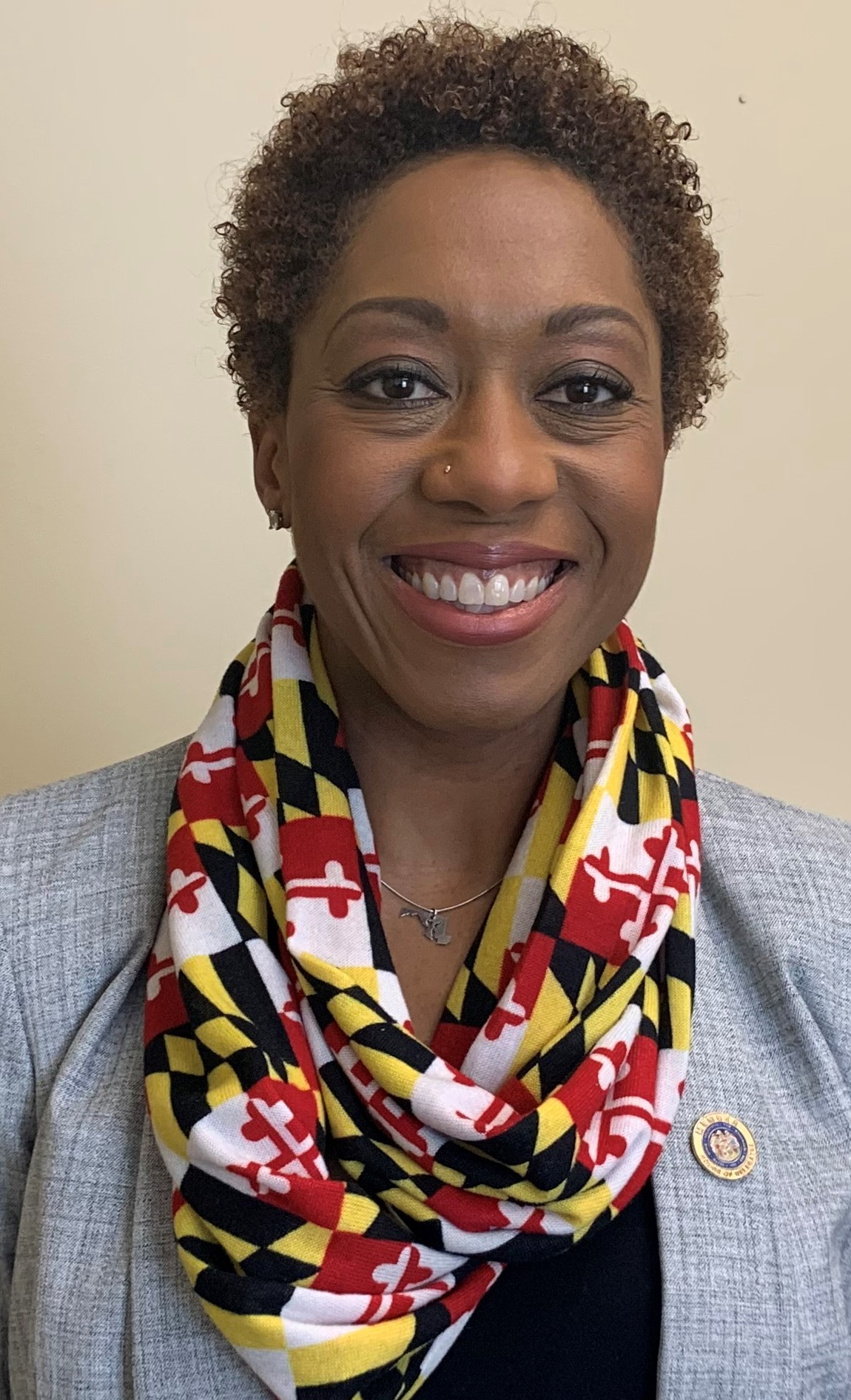

Member of the Maryland House of Delegates from the 43rd district
- Incumbent
- Assumed office January 9, 2019 Serving with Curt Anderson Maggie McIntosh
- Preceded by: Mary L. Washington
- Constituency: Baltimore City

Personal details
- Born: August 7, 1976 (age 50) Washington, D.C., U.S.
- Party: Democratic

Regina T. Boyce (born August 7, 1976) is an American politician who has served as a Democratic member of the Maryland House of Delegates, representing the 43rd district since 2019.

== Background ==
Boyce was born on August 7, 1976, in Washington, D.C. She is of Jamaican and Barbadian descent. Boyce graduated from the Woodlawn High School in Baltimore County, Maryland and later attended Catonsville Community College and Towson University, where she earned a B.S. degree in kinesiology and psychology in 1998, and the University of Baltimore, where she earned a M.P.A. degree in 2014. After graduating, she became the director of the Adult Learning Center for Strong City Baltimore.

Boyce ran for the Maryland House of Delegates in 2018, her first run for elective office. During the primary election, she formed a slate with state Senator Joan Carter Conway and state Delegate Maggie McIntosh.

== In the legislature ==
Boyce was sworn in as a member of the Maryland House of Delegates on January 9, 2019. She has been a member of the Environment and Transportation Committee since 2019, serving as its vice chair from 2023 to 2025. She has also served as a member of the Rules and Executive Nominations Committee since 2024. In August 2021, Boyce was appointed to a commission to study Maryland state parks and make recommendations on new parks in recreational deserts and upgrades to existing parks. In 2023, House Speaker Adrienne A. Jones announced Boyce as one of two chief deputy whips.

Boyce is a member of the Maryland Legislative Latino Caucus, the Maryland Legislative Transit Caucus, and the Women Legislators of Maryland. In April 2019, Boyce resigned from the Legislative Black Caucus of Maryland ahead of the vote to protest comments made by Delegate Darryl Barnes, the caucus chair, that she found "unacceptable and infuriating". Barnes had cast doubt about whether African-American members of the House of Delegates would want to vote for "a white lesbian"–referring to Maggie McIntosh, who is openly gay–in the election to nominate a new Speaker of the Maryland House of Delegates.

== Political positions ==
=== Agriculture ===
During the 2026 legislative session, after the Maryland Department of the Environment failed to reissue a critical permit for chicken houses on time, Boyce introduced a bill that would allow farmers to start construction on new chicken houses before the new permit is released for the industry.

=== Elections ===
During the 2021 legislative session, Boyce introduced legislation that would ban people from holding an elected public office and a political party office simultaneously.

=== Environment ===
During the 2020 legislative session, Boyce introduced legislation to ban the intentional release of balloons.

During the 2022 legislative session, Boyce introduced legislation that would require government agencies to evaluate the environmental impacts of their actions.

=== Housing ===
During the 2025 legislative session she sponsored a bill, along with Marvin E. Holmes Jr., Nick Allen, Linda Foley, Wayne A. Hartman, and Denise Roberts, revising the 2023 mandate for funding of reserve studies and preparation of funding plans by housing cooperatives, condominiums, and homeowners associations.

=== Policing ===
In 2019, Boyce voted against a bill that would allow Johns Hopkins University to form its own private police force. The bill passed through the Baltimore City Delegation by a vote of 9–4. She later voted against it in the House of Delegates, where it passed 94–42. In the same legislative session, she voted against legislation that would allow school resource officers to carry guns inside schools. The bill was rejected in a 10–5 vote.

== Personal life ==
Boyce is a ministry leader for the general education development preparation program at the Morning Star Baptist Church in Woodlawn, Maryland.

== Electoral history ==
Maryland House of Delegates District 43 Democratic Primary Election, 2018
Party	Candidate	Votes	%
Democratic	Maggie McIntosh	11,273	25.0
Democratic	Regina T. Boyce	7,924	17.6
Democratic	Curt Anderson	7,886	17.5
Democratic	Nilesh Kalyanaraman	7,455	16.5
Democratic	Kelly Fox	5,149	11.4
Democratic	Dong Shen	2,323	5.2
Democratic	Destinee Parker	1,953	4.3
Democratic	Urcille Goddard	1,122	2.5

Maryland House of Delegates District 43 Election, 2018
Party	Candidate	Votes	%
Democratic	Regina T. Boyce	28,500	32.0
Democratic	Maggie McIntosh	28,348	31.8
Democratic	Curt Anderson	24,229	27.2
Green	Bonnie "Raven" Lane	7,490	8.4
Write-In		545	0.6
