= Singapore Sepaktakraw Federation =

Kick volleyball governing body

- Sport: Sepaktakraw
- Abbreviation: PERSES
- Founded: 1959
- Affiliation: International Sepaktakraw Federation (ISTAF)
- Location: 07 Bedok North Street 2, Singapore
- President: Mohd Nasri Bin Haron

Official website
- www.sgsepaktakraw.org
- (Singapore)

The Singapore Sepaktakraw Federation (Malay: Persekutuan Sepaktakraw Singapura; abbreviated PERSES), is the national governing body for sepaktakraw in Singapore, founded in 1959 at Istana Kampong Glam, and was recognized as one of the community associations on 1999 by the government People's Association. The roles of the PERSES include organising the domestic competitions; the Premier League and the National League, which was established in 1991, promote and develop Sepaktakraw, locally and internationally, establish a long-term athlete development plan and develop a national curriculum for sepaktakraw, as well as a selection of players for the international competitions.

In 2021, the PERSES also created the first female Sepaktakraw national team to compete at 2021 SEA Games in Vietnam.

== History ==
The federation was officially registered as the national governing body for sepaktakraw in Singapore on 15 June 1960 at Istana Kampong Glam, Sultan Gate, after the list of proposed office bearers was sent to the Registrar of Societies (SOS) of Singapore in October 1959, the proposal was approved under the registered document no. 179/59, with Mohd Amin Bin Haji Jamil, who was the acting assistant Commissioner of Police at that moment, served as the first president of the federation. Since its inception, building no. 286 on Jalan Eunos was registered as the federation office, until 1986 it was moved to no. 1 Jalan Pasar Baru in Geylang Serai, and again to the Bedok Centre of Excellence in 2002-2018. Currently, the PERSES head office is stationed at the Heartbeat Bedok Sports Hall.

The Singapore Sepaktakraw Federation was categorized as one of the Singaporean social organizations under the People's Association Act (PA Act) on 18 March 1999, together with the Singapore Silat Federation (Persekutuan Silat Singapura; PERSIS), making sepaktakraw becomes the traditional tournament in many sports activities of the association.

== National championship ==
The Singapore Sepaktakraw Federation established two national championships in 1991 namely; the Premier League and the National League, in which each affiliated domestic club has been participating annually for the title. As of 2021, twenty-one Sepaktakraw clubs in total are affiliated with the PERSES.

== Board of directors ==
The lists below are the current board of directors of the Sepaktakraw Association of Indonesia, as well as the former ones. A former president of the PERSES, Abdul Halim Kader, was also elected by the 2021 Asian Sepaktakraw Federation congress election to take a seat as its president for the term 2021 to 2025 after he expired from the term of office in PERSES by completing its four-year term.

- President: Mohd Nasri Bin Haron (since 2021)
- Secretary General: Zahid Bin Abdul Aziz (since 2021)

Former President
No	Name	Years
1.	Mohd Jamil Mohd Amin	1960 – 1961
2.	Adnan Isa	1961 – 1963
3.	Salim Bin Sulaiman	1964 – 1970
4.	Mohd Ghazali Ismail	1971 – 1973
5.	Haji Yaacob Mohamed	1974 – 1988
6.	Yatiman Yusoff	1989 – 1993
7.	Mahmud Awang	1993 – 1997
8.	Mohd Maidin Packer Mohd	1998 – 2000
9.	Abdul Halim Bin Kader	2000 – 2013, 2016 – 2019
10.	Abdul Sarip Naharawi	2013 – 2015
11.	Mohd Nasri Bin Haron	2019 - 2023, 2023 - Present

Former Secretary General
No	Name	Years
1.	Mohd Amin Mohd Jamil	1960 – 1961
2.	Mahmud Bin Awang	1961 – 1963
3.	Daud Bin Sirun	1964 – 1972
4.	Aziz Mustajab	1979 – 1981
5.	Abdul Halim Bin Kader	1982 – 1999, 2013 – 2015
6.	Abdul Sarip Naharawi	1999 – 2005, 2010 – 2012
7.	Shamsul Kahar Bin Lob	2006 – 2007
8.	Mohamed Seth Bin Ismail	2008 – 2009
9.	Rohaizan Sarip	2015 – 2016
10.	Borhan Bin Sani	2016 – 2019
11.	Zahid Bin Abdul Aziz	2019 - 2023, 2023 - Present
