= Nick Allen (politician) =

American politician (born 1990)

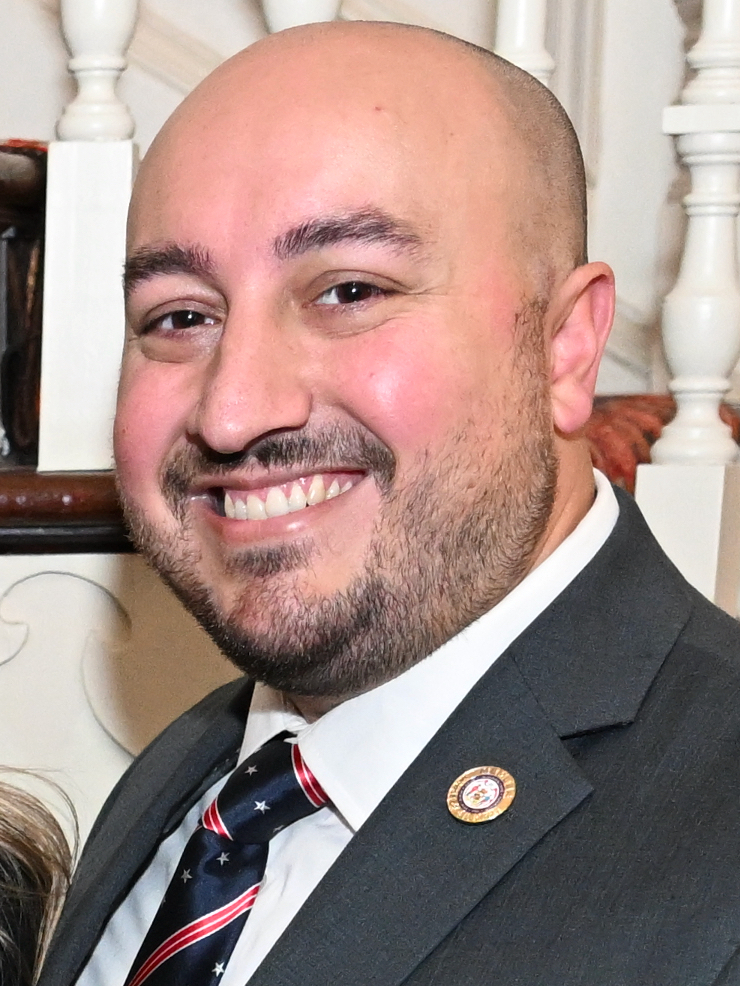

Member of the Maryland House of Delegates from the 8th district
- Incumbent
- Assumed office January 11, 2023 Serving with Kim Ross and Harry Bhandari
- Preceded by: Joseph C. Boteler III

Personal details
- Born: 1990 (age 35–36)
- Party: Democratic
- Education: Mount Saint Joseph High School; United States Military Academy (BA)
- Website: Campaign website

Military service
- Branch/service: United States Army
- Years of service: 2012–2016
- Rank: Platoon leader
- Unit: 7th Cavalry Regiment; 9th Field Artillery Regiment
- Battles/wars: War in Afghanistan

Nicholas J. Allen (born 1990) is an American politician who is a member of the Maryland House of Delegates for District 8 in Baltimore County, Maryland.

== Background ==
Allen graduated from Mount Saint Joseph High School in 2007 and attended the United States Military Academy, where he earned a Bachelor of Arts degree in arts, philosophy, and literature in 2011. He served as a platoon leader for the 7th Cavalry Regiment from 2013 to 2014, for the 9th Field Artillery Regiment in 2014, and as an executive officer for U.S. Forces – Afghanistan (USFOR-A) until 2016.

After serving in the military, Allen worked as an assurance manager for General Motors in Detroit, Michigan, from 2017 to 2019, before moving to Aberdeen and working at GES Warehouse and PepsiCo. Since 2021, Allen has worked as a program manager for the Maryland Department of Health.

== In the legislature ==
Allen was sworn into the Maryland House of Delegates on January 11, 2023. He is a member of the House Environment and Transportation Committee. During the 2025 legislative session he sponsored a bill, along with Marvin E. Holmes Jr., Linda Foley, Wayne A. Hartman, Denise Roberts, and Regina T. Boyce, revising the 2023 mandate for funding of reserve studies and preparation of funding plans by housing cooperatives, condominiums, and homeowners associations.

== Electoral history ==
Maryland House of Delegates District 8 Democratic primary election, 2022
Party	Candidate	Votes	%
Democratic	Carl W. Jackson (incumbent)	7,712	34.0
Democratic	Harry Bhandari (incumbent)	7,678	33.8
Democratic	Nick Allen	7,306	32.2

Maryland House of Delegates District 8 election, 2022
Party	Candidate	Votes	%
Democratic	Harry Bhandari (incumbent)	19,702	21.62
Democratic	Carl W. Jackson (incumbent)	18,950	20.79
Democratic	Nick Allen	18,062	19.82
Republican	Kathleen A. Smero	11,838	12.99
Republican	Timothy M. Neubauer	11,259	12.36
Republican	Glen Geelhaar	11,243	12.34
Write-in		74	0.08
