= Linda Foley =

American politician & labor leader (born 1955)

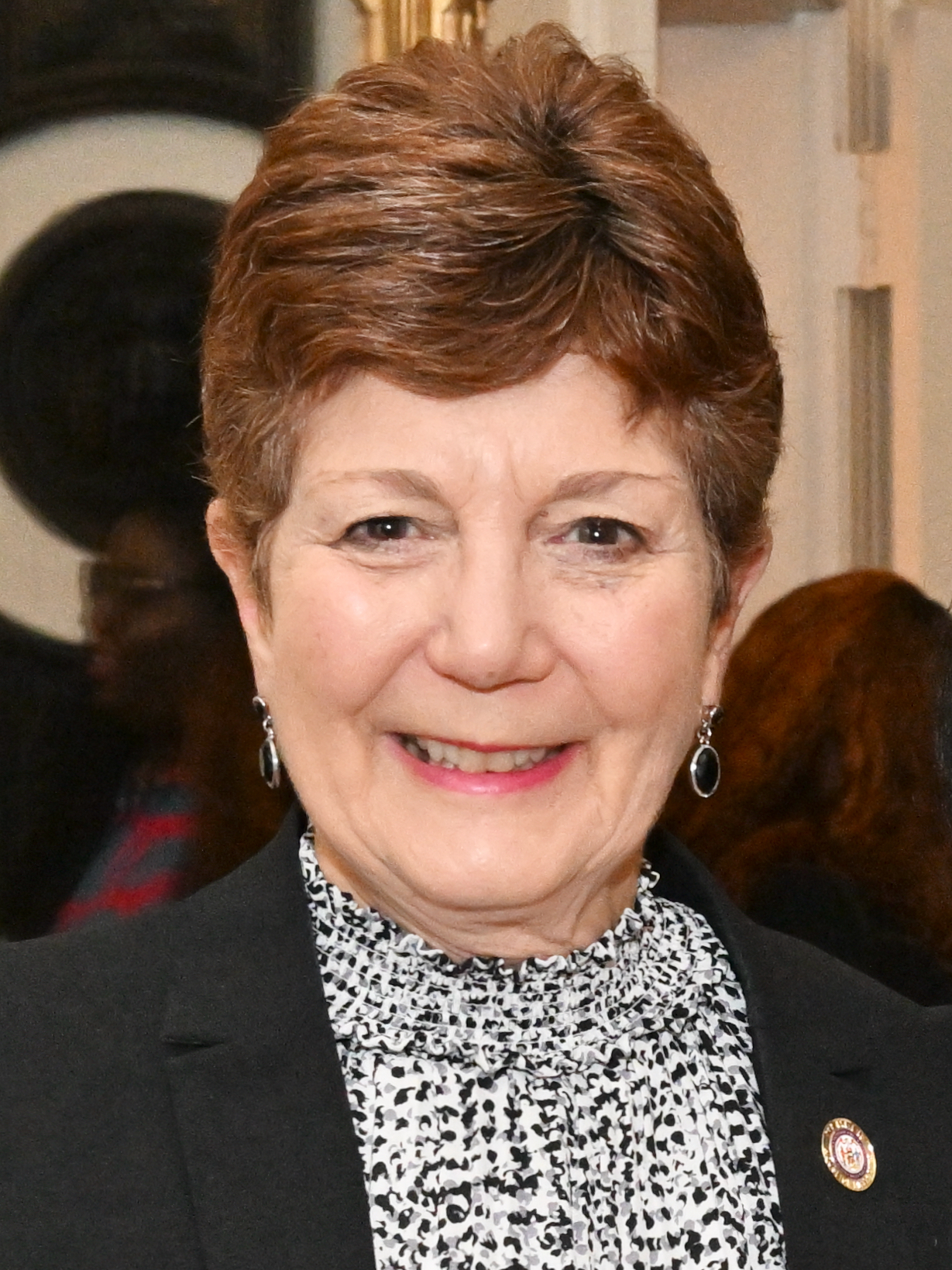
- Foley in 2023

Member of the Maryland House of Delegates from the 15th district
- Incumbent
- Assumed office December 17, 2021 Serving with David Fraser-Hidalgo and Lily Qi
- Appointed by: Larry Hogan
- Preceded by: Kathleen Dumais

Vice President of the Communication Workers of America
- In office 1995–2008
- Succeeded by: Bernie Lunzer

Personal details
- Born: March 10, 1955 (age 71) Pittsburgh, Pennsylvania, U.S.
- Party: Democratic
- Occupation: Journalist; labor organizer

Linda K. Foley (born March 10, 1955) is an American politician and labor organizer who previously served as president of the Newspaper Guild and vice-president of the Communications Workers of America from 1995 through 2008. In December 2021, Maryland Governor Larry Hogan appointed her to fill a vacancy in District 15 of the Maryland House of Delegates (Montgomery County).

== Early life and career ==
Foley was born in Pittsburgh on March 10, 1955, where she attended Fox Chapel Area High School.

She was a reporter for the Lexington Herald-Leader in Lexington, Kentucky before turning to full-time work at the Guild in 1984. She was elected its secretary-treasurer in 1993 and its president in 1995. She received a Bachelor of Science degree in journalism from the Medill School of Journalism at Northwestern University in Evanston, Illinois, in 1977.

In 1995, Foley was elected the first woman President of the Newspaper Guild, which would eventually merge with the Communications Workers of America in 1997. In May 2008, Foley was defeated for re-election by Newspaper Guild Secretary-Treasurer Bernie Lunzer.

Foley later became the president of the Berger-Marks Foundation, an organization promoting women in the labor movement, which closed in 2017. She was elected to the Montgomery County, Maryland, Democratic Central Committee in 2018 and subsequently became the chair of the Montgomery County, Maryland, Democratic Party.

== In the legislature ==
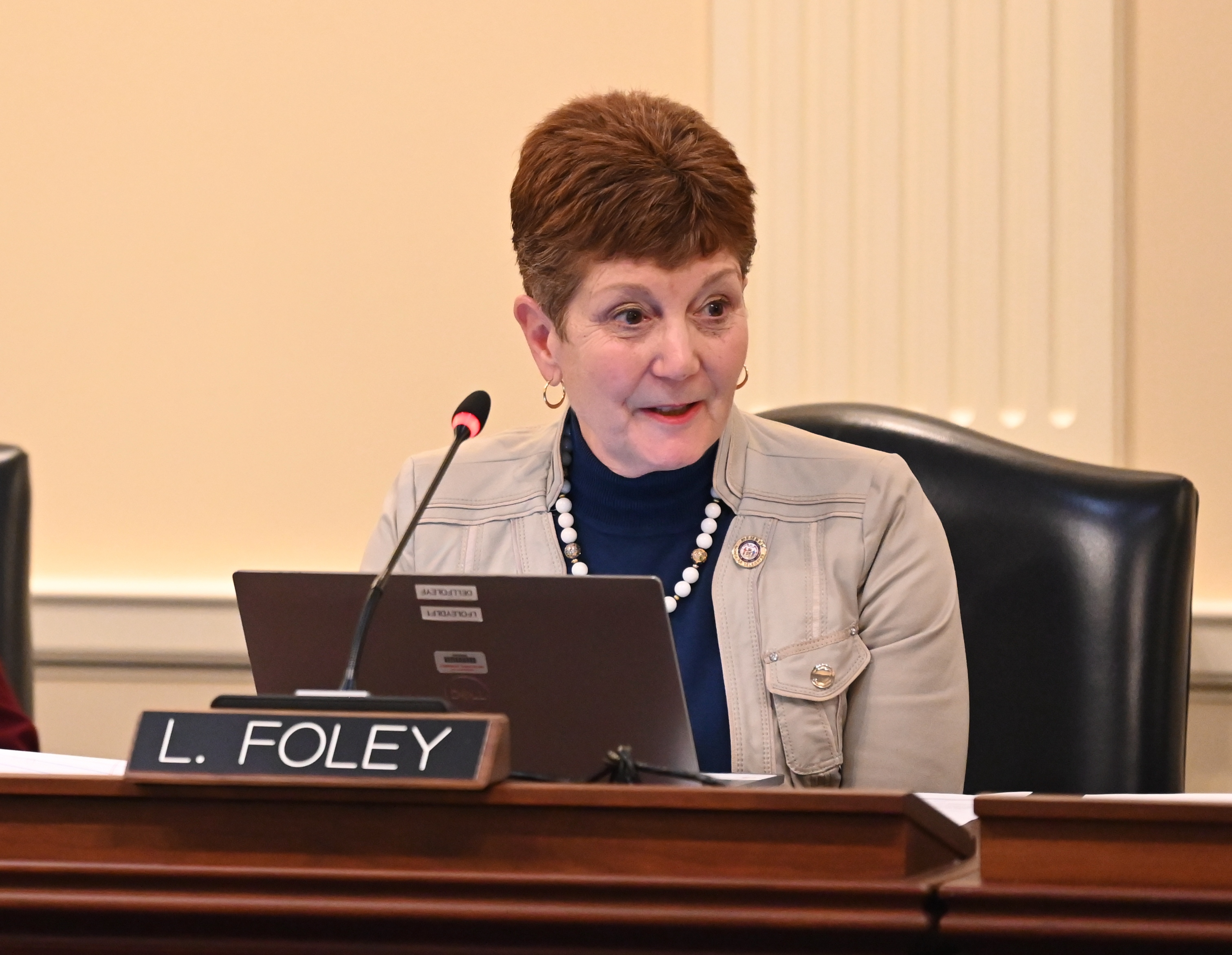
Foley in the Environment and Transportation Committee, 2024

In December 2021, the Montgomery County Democratic Party voted 20-2 to nominate Foley to fill a vacancy left by the resignation of former Delegate Kathleen Dumais, who was appointed as a Circuit Court judge by Maryland Governor Larry Hogan. Her opponents, attorney Michael Shrier and former delegate Saqib Ali, each garnered one vote. Hogan appointed Foley to the House of Delegates on December 14, 2021.

During the 2025 legislative session he sponsored a bill, along with Marvin E. Holmes Jr., Nick Allen, Wayne A. Hartman, Denise Roberts, and Regina T. Boyce, revising the 2023 mandate for funding of reserve studies and preparation of funding plans by housing cooperatives, condominiums, and homeowners associations.

=== Other memberships ===
- Women Legislators of Maryland (2021–present)

== Controversy ==
Ms. Foley drew criticism after May 13, 2005, for stating that the U.S. military is responsible for journalists being targeted – "not just being targeted verbally or, politically. They are also being targeted for real, in places like Iraq. What outrages me as a representative of journalists is that there's not more outrage about the number, and the brutality and the cavalier nature of the US military toward the killing of journalists in Iraq. I think it's just a scandal. They target and kill journalists from other countries, particularly Arab countries like Al Jazeera, for example. They actually target them and blow up their studios with impunity."

In August 2005, the Columbia Journalism Review stated in an editorial: "Target and kill? Foley has been under attack since she said those words. And should be. Even the infamous killing of journalists by tank fire at the Palestine Hotel in Baghdad was found not to have been deliberate, in an extensive investigation by Reporters Without Borders. Some facts: according to The Committee to Protect Journalists, at least 36 journalists have been killed in action in Iraq since March 2003, along with 18 media support workers; insurgent actions account for 34 of those 54 deaths; U.S. military fire accounts for at least 11. The committee says the record shows that "the military seems indifferent and unwilling . . . to take steps to mitigate risk." But target and kill? The committee finds "no evidence to conclude that the U.S. military has deliberately targeted the press in Iraq. So on that subject here's what Foley should have said: nothing."
