= Wayne A. Hartman =

American politician (born 1967)

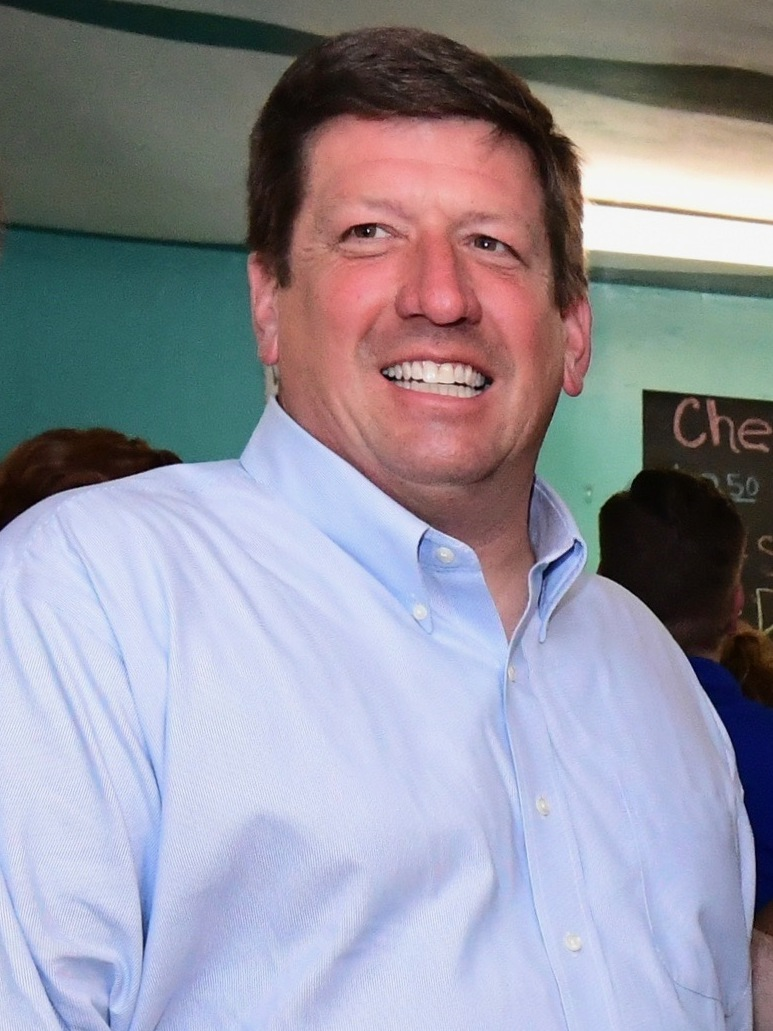
- Hartman in 2019

Member of the Maryland House of Delegates from the 38C district
- Incumbent
- Assumed office January 9, 2019
- Preceded by: Mary Beth Carozza

Member of the Ocean City Council
- In office 2014–2018
- Preceded by: Brent Ashley; Margaret Pillas
- Succeeded by: Mark L. Paddack

Personal details
- Born: December 14, 1967 (age 58) Baltimore, Maryland, U.S.
- Party: Republican
- Children: 2

Wayne A. Hartman (born December 14, 1967) is an American politician who has served as a Republican member of the Maryland House of Delegates, representing District 38C in Wicomico and Worcester counties, since 2019. He previously served on the Ocean City Council for one four-year term.

== Early life ==
Hartman was born in Baltimore, Maryland on December 14, 1967. He attended Eastern Vocational Technical High School and graduated from the University of Phoenix, earning a B.S. degree in business administration in 2006.

Hartman bought his first property in the Ocean City, Maryland at the age of 19 and, as of March 2016, owns 40 units in the resort town.

Hartman is married and has two children. He is the owner of Wayne Hartman Management LLC, a management services company in Ocean City, Maryland. Since 2019, he has been a member of the Atlantic General Hospital Foundation.

== Political career ==
In 2014, Hartman was elected to serve on the Ocean City Council. As councilman, Hartman oversaw the construction of barrier systems on the boardwalk and the controversial refurbishment of memorial plaques on the boardwalk's benches. Hartman also served as the chairman for the Recreation and Parks Committee, as a member of the Police Commission, and on the Ocean City Noise Board. Prior to that, he sat on the ADA Committee as well as the Property Review and Enforcement Strategies for Safe Housing Committee.

=== In the legislature ===
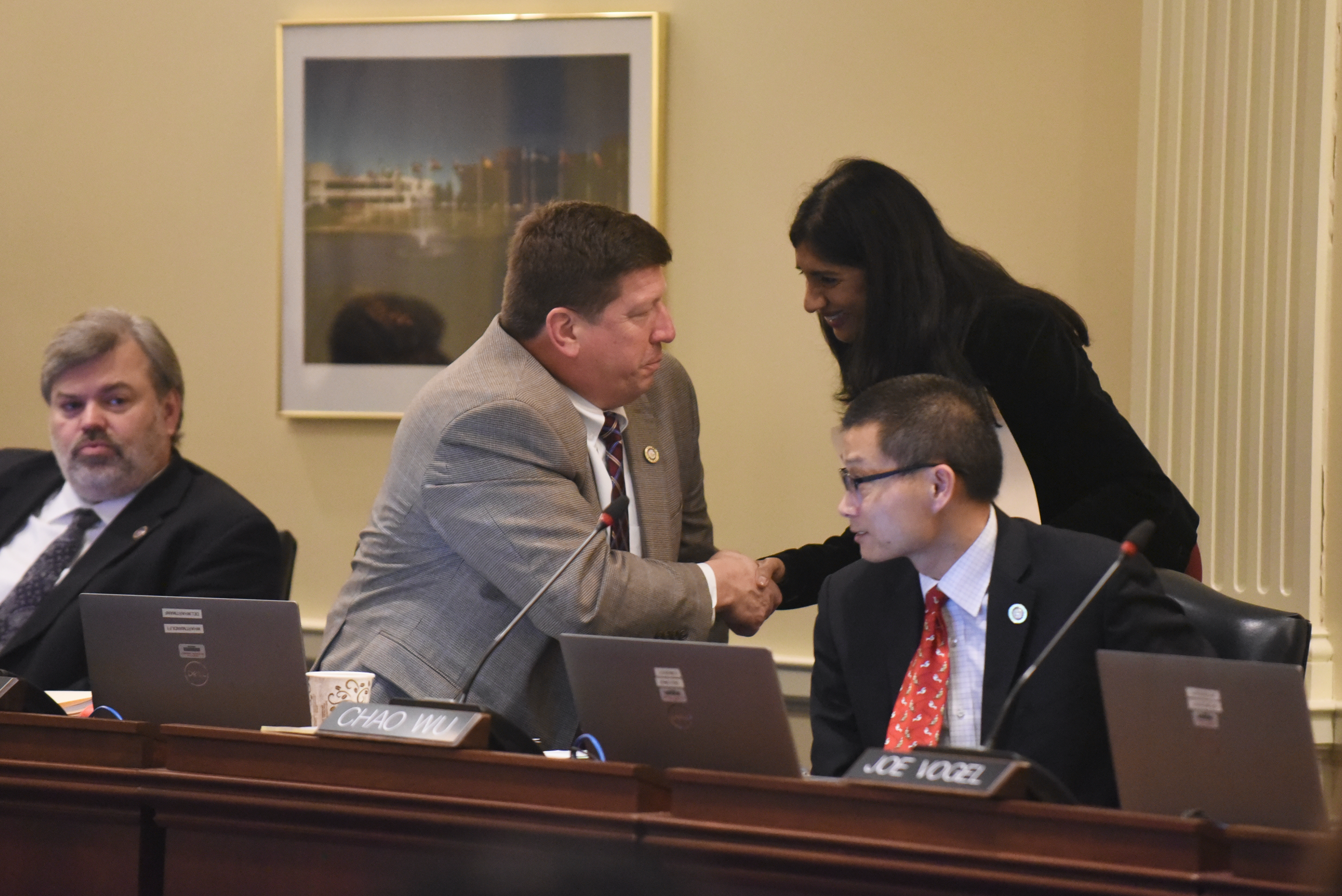
Hartman shakes Lieutenant Governor Aruna Miller's hand in the House Ways and Means Committee, 2023

In December 2017, Hartman announced his candidacy for the Maryland House of Delegates after incumbent delegate Mary Beth Carozza said she would challenge state senator Jim Mathias in the 2018 Maryland Senate elections. He prevailed in the Republican primary with 49.3 percent of the vote and ran unopposed in the general election.

Hartman was sworn into the Maryland House of Delegates on January 9, 2019. He served on the Judiciary Committee from 2019 to 2020, afterwards serving in the Ways and Means Committee. Since 2022, Hartman has served as the Chief Deputy Minority Whip.

== Political positions ==
=== Crime and policing ===
In November 2023, Hartman criticized the Juvenile Justice Reform Act, a bill that passed in the 2022 legislative session which restricted the state's ability to charge juveniles for most offenses, blaming it for an increase in juvenile crime in the state. During the 2026 legislative session, he opposed a bill to ban law enforcement officers from wearing face coverings, predicting that it would be struck down as unconstitutional by the courts.

=== Environment ===
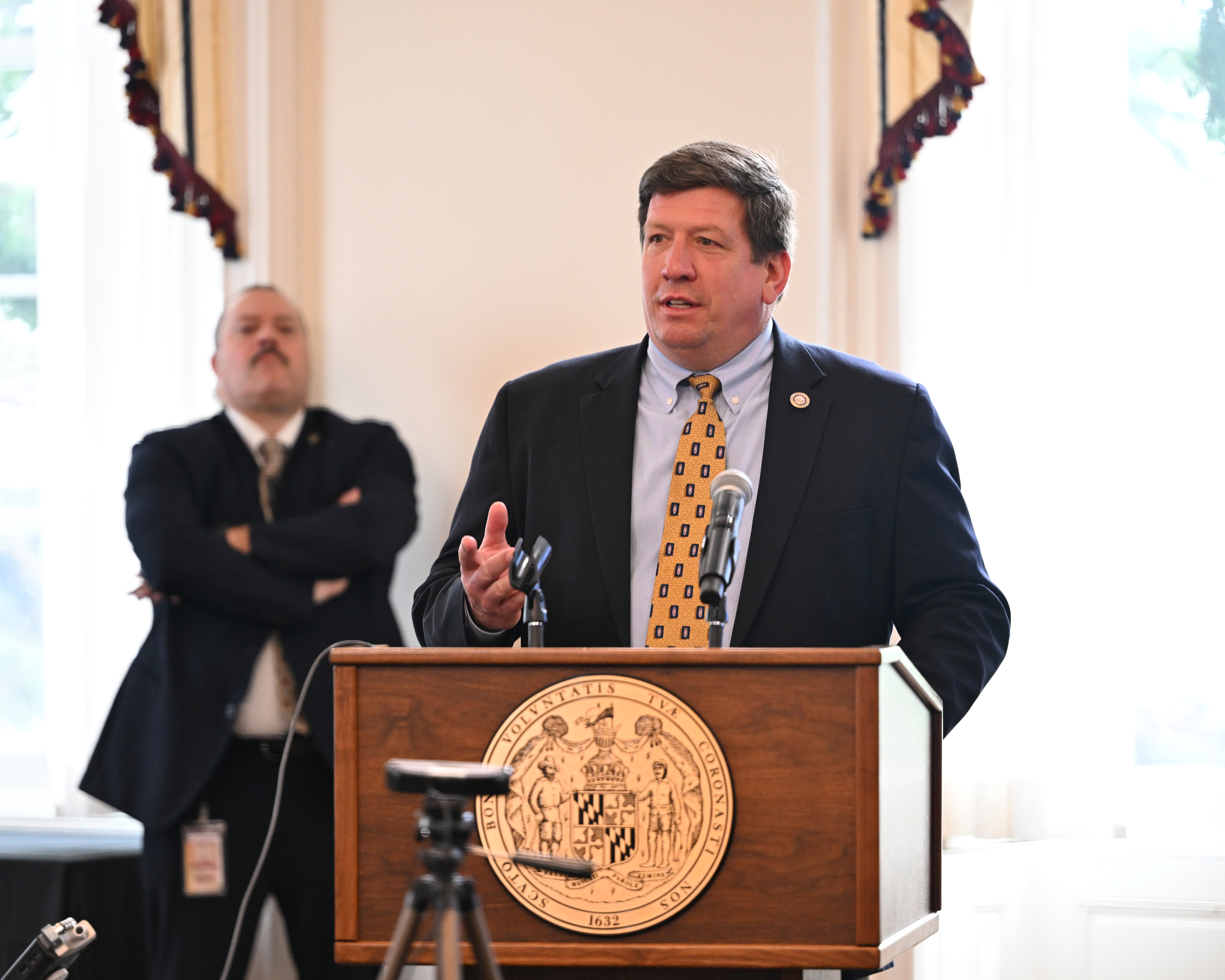
Hartman testifies to the Maryland Board of Public Works against US Wind's proposals to build a wind farm off the coast of Ocean City, 2024

During debate on a bill to quadruple the state's offshore wind energy capacity in 2023, Hartman introduced an amendment that would require the state to consider marine life when approving wind farms, citing unproven claims that noise from wind farm development was responsible for whale deaths. The amendment was rejected in a 36-98 vote. In August 2025, he celebrated the Trump administration's plans to revoke federal offshore wind permits for US Wind's proposed wind farm off the coast of Ocean City, saying that the project went "full steam ahead with no regard for the impact it will have on our community" with respect to the area's tourism economy, real estate values, and commercial fishing industry.

In January 2026, Hartman criticized the Renewable Energy Certainty Act, which creates statewide standards for commercial solar farms in Maryland and overturns local zoning laws that restricted where solar farms could be built, saying that taking local control away from where solar farms could be built is hurting Maryland's farm industry by stripping the topsoil during installation. He supports installing solar over parking lots and rooftops. In March 2026, Hartman voted against the Utility RELIEF Act, saying that projections that the bill would save Maryland ratepayers up to $150 a year were unrealistic for rural customers.

=== Gun policy ===
During debate on a bill banning privately made firearms in 2022, Hartman introduced an amendment that would require the state to produce a list of firearms dealers who provide serialization services in the state. The amendment was rejected by the House of Delegates in a 49-83 vote. He would later vote against the bill, criticizing Democratic lawmakers for not working with Republicans to craft the legislation.

=== Housing ===
During the 2025 legislative session he sponsored a bill, along with Marvin E. Holmes Jr., Nick Allen, Linda Foley, Denise Roberts, and Regina T. Boyce, revising the 2023 mandate for funding of reserve studies and preparation of funding plans by housing cooperatives, condominiums, and homeowners associations.

=== Immigration ===
During the 2026 legislative session, Hartman opposed a bill that would prohibit U.S. Immigration and Customs Enforcement officers hired during the second Trump administration from becoming Maryland law enforcement officers, predicting that it would be struck down as being unconstitutional if it passed.

=== Marijuana ===
During the 2023 legislative session, Hartman introduced an amendment to the state's marijuana industry framework bill that would have prohibited dispensaries from being located within a mile of a school or recreation center. C. T. Wilson, the bill's sponsor, argued that the amendment would have effectively banned dispensaries in Ocean City, something Hartman said he said he wasn't "heartbroken" by. The amendment was rejected in a 37-103 vote.

=== Ocean City boardwalk ===
In October 2017, Hartman proposed privatizing parts of the Ocean City boardwalk in order to control street performers and the town's homeless population. In May 2018, the Ocean City council voted 3-1 to consult legal counsel on the proposal to privatize the boardwalk's picnic tables. The council also voted unanimously to approve of several recommendations made by the Ocean City Police Department aimed at preventing loitering at the comfort station on Caroline Street, a popular location among the town's homeless population.

=== Redistricting ===
In January 2022, Hartman filed a lawsuit against the legislative district maps drawn by the Maryland General Assembly during the 2020 redistricting cycle, seeking to replace the newly passed map with one that uses only single-member districts. The Maryland Court of Appeals ruled 4-3 against the plaintiffs in April 2022, upholding the legislature's map.

In December 2025, Hartman opposed mid-decade redistricting efforts in Maryland, calling the issue a waste of time and a distraction from other issues facing the state. He criticized the Governor's Redistricting Advisory Commission's recommendation to adopt a congressional redistricting plan that would redraw Maryland's 1st congressional district to improve the Democratic Party's chances of winning it, saying that just because other states are changing their congressional districts doesn't mean Maryland should.

=== Social issues ===
During debate on a bill on a bill creating a statewide referendum on codifying Roe v. Wade into the Constitution of Maryland in 2022, Hartman introduced an amendment that would require clinicians to notify guardians of unwed minors before providing abortion services. The amendment was rejected by the House of Delegates in a 42-84 vote.

=== Taxes ===
In January 2026, Hartman said he supported reinstating Maryland's sales tax exemption for gold and silver bullion, saying that the tax was "like paying 6 percent on your 401(k)" and predicting that Maryland residents would travel to neighboring states to avoid sales taxes. He also supports lowering Maryland's corporate income tax rate, citing mass layoffs of federal workers by the second Trump administration.

== Electoral history ==
Ocean City Council election, 2014
Candidate	Votes	%
Matthew James	1,666	21.0
Wayne Hartman	1,345	16.9
Lloyd Martin (incumbent)	1,342	16.9
Tony DeLuca	1,287	16.2
Chris Rudolf	1,075	13.5
Joe Hall	775	9.8
Joe Cryer	446	5.6

Maryland House of Delegates District 38C Republican primary election, 2018
Party	Candidate	Votes	%
Republican	Wayne A. Hartman	1,996	49.3
Republican	Joe Schanno	1,584	39.1
Republican	Ed Tinus	333	8.2
Republican	Jim Shaffer	134	3.3

Maryland House of Delegates District 38C election, 2018
Party	Candidate	Votes	%
Republican	Wayne A. Hartman	15,247	95.4
Write-in		730	4.6

Maryland House of Delegates District 38C election, 2018
Party	Candidate	Votes	%
Republican	Wayne A. Hartman	15,247	95.4
Write-in		730	4.6

Maryland House of Delegates District 38C election, 2022
Party	Candidate	Votes	%
Republican	Wayne A. Hartman (incumbent)	16,198	97.8
Write-in		366	2.2
