= Marvin E. Holmes Jr. =

American politician (born 1948)

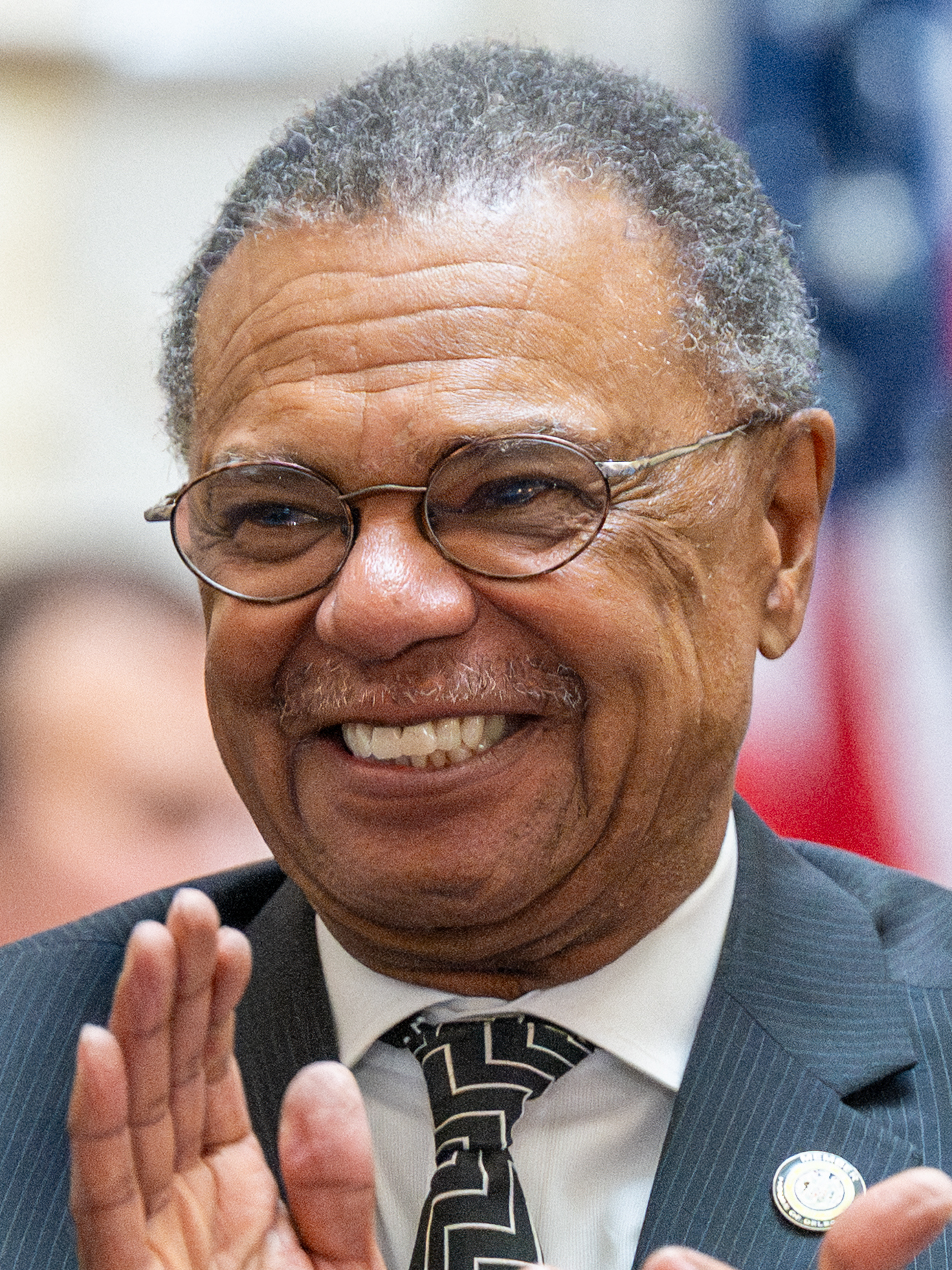
- Holmes in 2025

Member of the Maryland House of Delegates from the 23B district
- Incumbent
- Assumed office January 8, 2003 Serving with Joseph F. Vallario Jr. and Ron Watson
- Preceded by: Joan Breslin Pitkin
- Constituency: Prince George's County, Maryland

Personal details
- Born: Marvin Earl Holmes Jr. November 27, 1948 (age 77) Cleveland, Ohio, U.S.
- Party: Democratic
- Spouse: Maggie L. Holmes
- Children: 4
- Occupation: Real estate agent

Marvin Earl Holmes Jr. (born November 27, 1948) is an American politician. He is a member of the Maryland House of Delegates, representing District 23B in Prince George's County, Maryland.

== Early life and career ==
Holmes was born in Cleveland, Ohio, on November 28, 1948. He graduated from Max S. Hayes Vocational School and later attended Tuskegee University, concentrating in engineering. Holmes served in the U.S. Coast Guard from 1970 until 1974 where he earned a Commendation Medal and the National Defense Service Medal. He was a member of the presidential honor guard and a search and rescue air crewman. Outside of politics, Holmes is a real estate agent and has been in the field for over 25 years.

== In the legislature ==
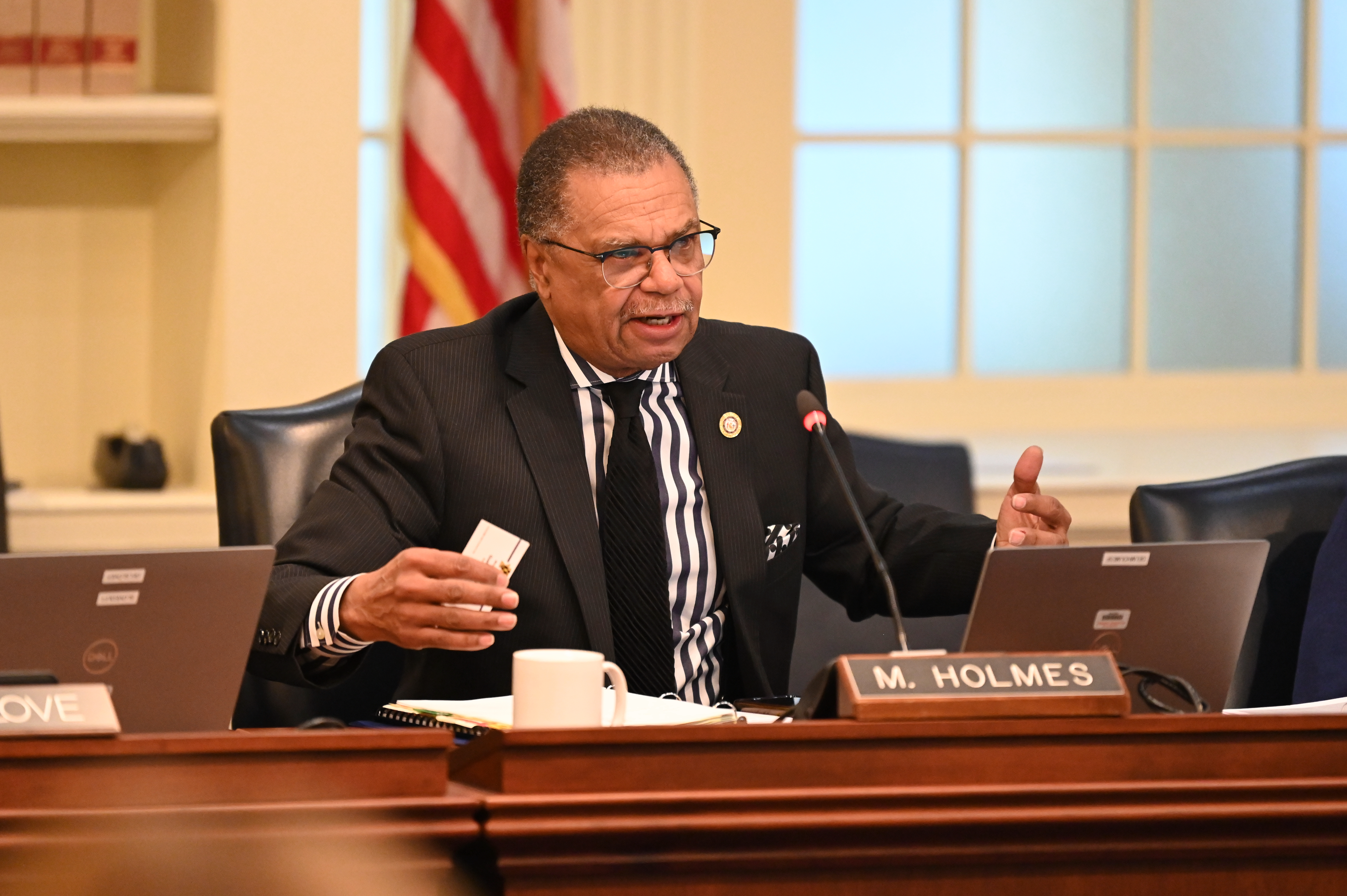
Holmes in the Environment and Transportation Committee, 2024

Holmes was sworn into the Maryland House of Delegates on January 8, 2003.

In July 2024, after Prince George's County councilmember Mel Franklin resigned from his at-large seat on the county council, Holmes filed to run in the special election to succeed Franklin. He was defeated in the Democratic primary by Jolene Ivey on August 6, 2024.

=== Committee assignments ===
- Vice-Chair, Rules and Executive Nominations Committee, 2020–present
- Member, Environment and Transportation Committee, 2015–present (natural resources, agriculture & open space subcommittee, 2015–2018; land use & ethics subcommittee, 2015–present; chair, housing & real property subcommittee, 2015–present)
- Member, Joint Committee on Administrative, Executive and Legislative Review, 2015–present
- Member, Environmental Matters Committee, 2003–2015
- Deputy Majority Whip, 2006–2010
- Member, Joint Legislative Work Group to Study State, County and Municipal Fiscal Relationships, 2009–2010
- Vice-Chair, House Emergency Medical Services Work Group, 2009–2012
- Member, Business Climate Work Group, 2013–2014
- House Chair, Joint Committee on Legislative Ethics, 2015–2017

=== Other memberships ===
- 2nd Vice-Chair, Prince George's County Delegation, 2003–2010 (vice-chair, 2017; law enforcement & state-appointed boards committee, 2008, 2015–2016; washington suburban sanitary commission committee, 2008–2012; vice-chair, bi-county committee, 2018–present, member, 2003–2007, 2013–2014)
- Member, Legislative Black Caucus of Maryland, 2003–present (historian, 2011–2012)
- Member, Maryland Green Caucus, 2003–present
- Member, Maryland Veterans Caucus, 2005–present
- Chair, Democratic Party Caucus, 2011–2015
- Member, National Conference of State Legislatures (legislative effectiveness & state government committee, 2005–2007; legislative effectiveness committee, 2007–present)

== Political positions ==
=== Housing ===
In April 2022, a law which Holmes co-sponsored, House Bill 107, which mandated that condominiums, housing associations, cooperatives, and homeowner associations complete a reserve study by October 1, 2023, passed both houses of the Maryland General Assembly. It went into effect in October 2023 and impacted condominium owners in Ocean City, Maryland and across Maryland, with unit owners facing "five-to-six digit bills over the next few years" to meet the law's deadlines which require a reserve fund for repairs and maintenance.

In October 2021, Holmes described reserve studies as necessary because of complaints by association members that they are hit with huge special assessments because there aren't "enough funds in their reserve accounts" and argued that the bill would "help protect against those scenarios". Holmes has been described as a "staunch supporter" of greater oversight of HOAs and condo associations and a "housing guru" in the Maryland General Assembly.

Previously, the Maryland General Assembly failed to adopt statewide legislation mandating reserve studies, but adopted similar legislation for Prince George's County in 2020 and Montgomery County in 2021. Holmes also helped write those reserve studies laws.

During the 2024 legislative session, Holmes supported a bill to give tenants the right of first refusal if the property owner of their residence seeks to sell the property.

In November 2024, Holmes stated that many underestimate how much living in a common ownership community costs, and noted that he would sponsor legislation in the 2025 legislative session that would "establish a statewide commission for common ownership communities," and that he would reintroduce a bill which sets "licensing standards for property managers." It was also noted that Holmes' previous attempts to pass legislation establishing "bill of rights" for residents of common ownership communities had "failed three times in as many sessions."

In 2025, he sponsored a bill, along with Nick Allen, Linda Foley, Wayne A. Hartman, Denise Roberts, and Regina T. Boyce, revising the 2023 mandate for funding of reserve studies and preparation of funding plans by housing cooperatives, condominiums, and homeowners associations. He worked with Community Associations Institute on the bill's introduction.

=== National politics ===
Following the 2021 United States Capitol attack, Holmes compared Donald Trump to Adolf Hitler, stating "What's going on, unfortunately, is the start of anarchy proposed and accelerated by Trump. We only need to look at how Hitler came into power by chipping away at a society by having others enacting his dominance. It's similar to how slavery became law; one statute at a time by those that have power, in an attempt to increase the powerlessness of those that they wish to dominate."

=== Social issues ===
In 2012, Holmes voted against legislation to expand gambling in Maryland; the bill passed the House of Delegates by a vote of 71-58 and was signed into law on August 15, 2012.

Holmes introduced legislation during the 2019 legislative session to lower the state's lead exposure threshold from 10 to 5 micrograms per deciliter, the Centers for Disease Control and Prevention's reference level that demonstrates elevated lead levels in children. The bill passed and was signed into law by Governor Larry Hogan on April 30, 2019.

=== Taxes ===
In 2012, Holmes voted for legislation to raise the state's fuel tax to replenish the state's transportation fund.

== Personal life ==
Holmes is married and has four daughters. He attends religious services at the Greater Mt. Nebo African Methodist Church in Bowie, Maryland.

== Electoral history ==
Maryland House of Delegates District 23B Democratic Primary Election, 2002
Party	Candidate	Votes	%
Democratic	Marvin E. Holmes, Jr.	3,316	51.6
Democratic	Karl L. Granzow	1,522	23.7
Democratic	Joseph Wright	1,306	20.3
Democratic	Daton Lynch	287	4.5

Maryland House of Delegates District 23B General Election, 2002
Party	Candidate	Votes	%
Democratic	Marvin E. Holmes, Jr.	10,674	99.3
	Other Write-Ins	78	0.7

Maryland House of Delegates District 23B Democratic Primary Election, 2006
Party	Candidate	Votes	%
Democratic	Marvin E. Holmes, Jr.	5,807	100

Maryland House of Delegates District 23B General Election, 2006
Party	Candidate	Votes	%
Democratic	Marvin E. Holmes, Jr.	11,951	99.4
	Other Write-Ins	77	0.6

Maryland House of Delegates District 23B Democratic Primary Election, 2010
Party	Candidate	Votes	%
Democratic	Marvin E. Holmes, Jr.	5,188	76.6
Democratic	Robin Breedon	1,583	23.4

Maryland House of Delegates District 23B General Election, 2010
Party	Candidate	Votes	%
Democratic	Marvin E. Holmes, Jr.	15,376	99.6
	Other Write-Ins	65	0.4

Maryland House of Delegates District 23B Democratic Primary Election, 2014
Party	Candidate	Votes	%
Democratic	Marvin E. Holmes, Jr.	6,323	32.8
Democratic	Joseph F. Vallario Jr.	5,284	27.4
Democratic	Ron Watson	4,357	22.6
Democratic	Thea Wilson	2,801	14.5
Democratic	Reginald Tyer, Jr.	524	2.7

Maryland House of Delegates District 23B General Election, 2014
Party	Candidate	Votes	%
Democratic	Marvin E. Holmes, Jr.	22,518	47.5
Democratic	Joseph F. Vallario Jr.	19,274	40.6
Republican	Mike Hethmon	5,494	11.6
	Other Write-Ins	142	0.3

Maryland House of Delegates District 23B Democratic Primary Election, 2018
Party	Candidate	Votes	%
Democratic	Ron Watson	8,869	29.5
Democratic	Marvin E. Holmes, Jr.	8,287	27.5
Democratic	Joseph F. Vallario, Jr.	6,519	21.7
Democratic	Denise Tyler	3,132	10.4
Democratic	Caleb L. Gilchrist	1,420	4.7
Democratic	Pennie Parker	1,106	3.7
Democratic	Paul Manicone	753	2.5

Maryland House of Delegates District 23B General Election, 2018
Party	Candidate	Votes	%
Democratic	Ron Watson	30,579	50.5
Democratic	Marvin E. Holmes, Jr.	29,235	48.3
	Other Write-Ins	685	1.1

Maryland House of Delegates District 23 Democratic Primary Election, 2022
Party	Candidate	Votes	%
Democratic	Marvin E. Holmes Jr. (incumbent)	10,382	16.2
Democratic	Adrian Boafo	9,237	14.4
Democratic	Kym Taylor	8,957	14.0
Democratic	Jocelyn Irene Collins	8,938	13.9
Democratic	Monica Roebuck	7,609	11.9
Democratic	Keenon James	6,104	9.5
Democratic	Remi Duyile	3,888	6.1
Democratic	Januari McKay	3,784	5.9
Democratic	Valeria Tomlin	2,630	4.1
Democratic	Jacqui Steele-McCall	2,575	4.0

Maryland House of Delegates District 23 General Election, 2022
Party	Candidate	Votes	%
Democratic	Marvin E. Holmes Jr.	36,506	33.89
Democratic	Kym Taylor	36,399	33.80
Democratic	Adrian Boafo	33,843	31.42
Write-in		957	0.89

Prince George's County Council At-Large Democratic special primary election, 2024
Party	Candidate	Votes	%
Democratic	Jolene Ivey	29,698	47.54
Democratic	Tim Adams	19,061	30.51
Democratic	Tamara Davis Brown	5,723	9.16
Democratic	Angela Angel	3,371	5.40
Democratic	Marvin E. Holmes Jr.	1,473	2.36
Democratic	Gabriel Njinimbot	1,176	1.88
Democratic	Kiesha D. Lewis (withdrawn)	859	1.38
Democratic	Judy Mickens-Murray	688	1.10
Democratic	Leo Bachi Eyomobo	416	0.67
