= Community association =

Nongovernmental organization

A community association is a nongovernmental association of participating members of a community, such as a neighborhood, village, condominium, cooperative, or group of homeowners or property owners in a delineated geographic area. Participation may be voluntary, require a specific residency, or require participation in an intentional community. Community associations may serve as social clubs, community promotional groups, service organizations, youth sports groups, community gardens, or quasi-governmental groups.

== Neighborhood associations in Spain ==
From 1968 onwards, during the Franco dictatorship, the first neighborhood associations were established in Spain under the 1964 Law of Associations of Heads of Families.

== Types ==
- Community land trust
- Community garden
- Community-supported agriculture
- Homeowners' association – association of property owners within a community
- Neighborhood association- voluntary association of property owners or residents in a neighborhood
- Intentional community – may or may not include formal association or governance
- Neighborhood watch
- Social club

== See also ==
- Community Associations Institute
- Neighborhood council
