= Harry Bhandari =

American politician (born 1977)

- ह्यारी भण्डारी
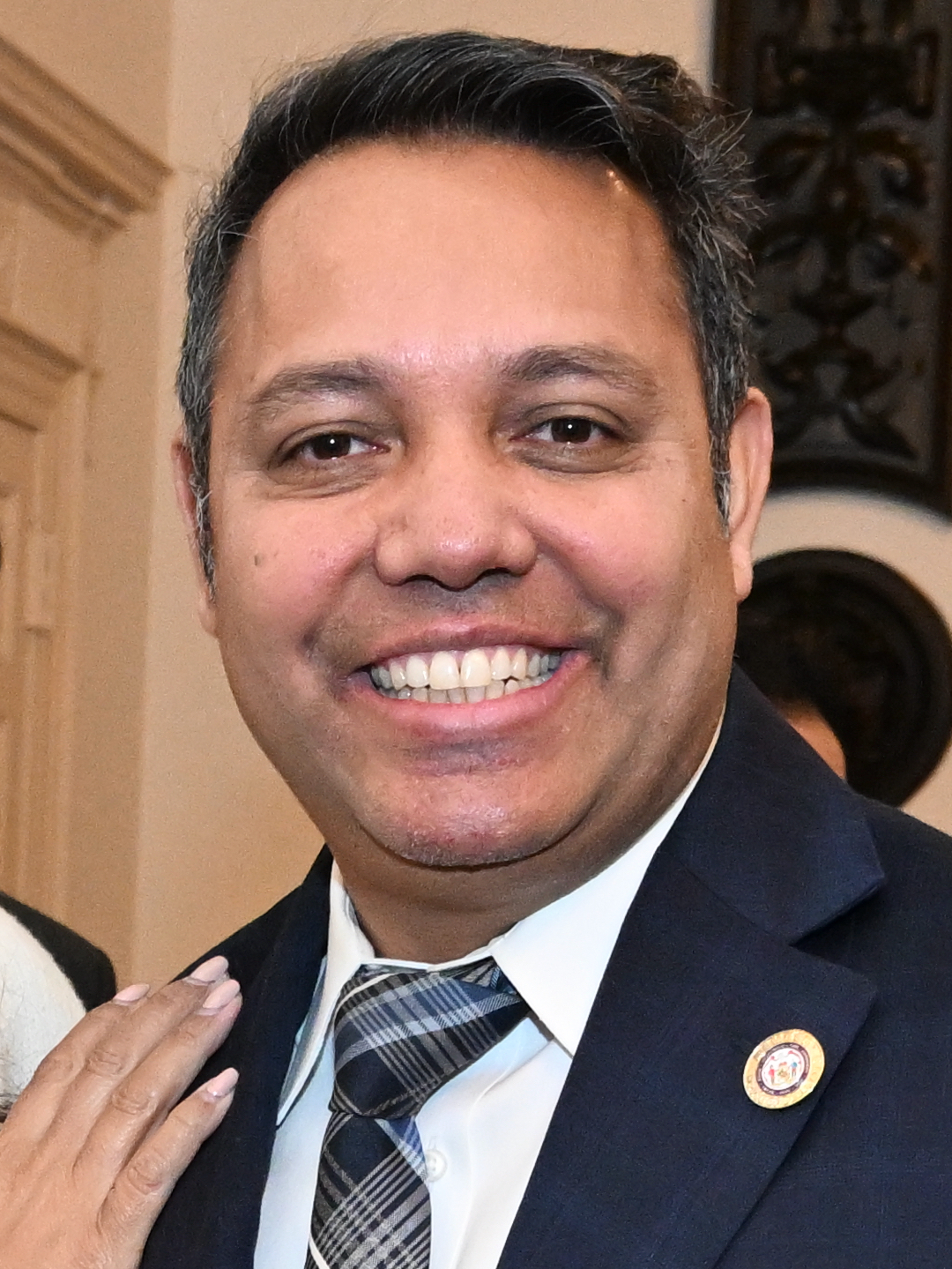
- Bhandari in 2025

Member of the Maryland House of Delegates from the 8th district
- Incumbent
- Assumed office January 9, 2019 Serving with Nick Allen, Kim Ross
- Preceded by: Joe Cluster

Personal details
- Born: October 1, 1977 (age 48) Thapathana, Nepal
- Citizenship: Nepal; United States (since 2011)
- Party: Democratic
- Children: 2
- Education: Prithvi Narayan Campus; Tribhuvan University (MA); University of Maryland, Baltimore County (PhD)
- Website: Campaign website

Harry Bhandari (Nepali: ह्यारी भण्डारी; born October 1, 1977) is a Nepalese-born American politician and educator. A member of the Democratic Party, he has served as a member of the Maryland House of Delegates from the eighth district since 2019. Bhandari is the first Nepali American elected to a state legislature in the United States.

Bhandari unsuccessfully ran in the 2024 U.S. House of Representatives election in Maryland's 2nd congressional district, placing a distant second to Baltimore County Executive Johnny Olszewski in the Democratic primary.

== Early life and education ==
Bhandari was born in Thapathana, Nepal, on October 1, 1977, to father Ammar Bahadur and mother Kanti Kumari. He graduated from Prithvi Narayan Campus, earned his master's in English literature from Tribhuvan University, and later attended the University of Maryland, Baltimore County where he received his Doctor of Philosophy in 2021.

Bhandari moved to the United States in 2005 to present a paper at George Mason University, and became a U.S. citizen in 2011.

== Career ==
Bhandari became a teacher for Baltimore County Public Schools in 2006 and later taught at Mergenthaler Vocational-Technical High School, and worked a faculty member for Baltimore City Community College. He briefly returned to Nepal following the April 2015 Nepal earthquake to assist earthquake victims.

Bhandari first entered politics in 2008 as a volunteer for Barack Obama's presidential campaign. He later served as the secretary of the Young Democrats of America's minority caucus and on the board of directors for the District 6 Democratic and Civic Association Club.

=== Maryland House of Delegates ===
Bhandari unsuccessfully ran for the Maryland House of Delegates in 2014. He won election to the Maryland House of Delegates in 2018, during which he ran on a slate with Carl W. Jackson and incumbent state delegate Eric Bromwell and defeated incumbent Republican state delegate Joe Cluster in the general election.

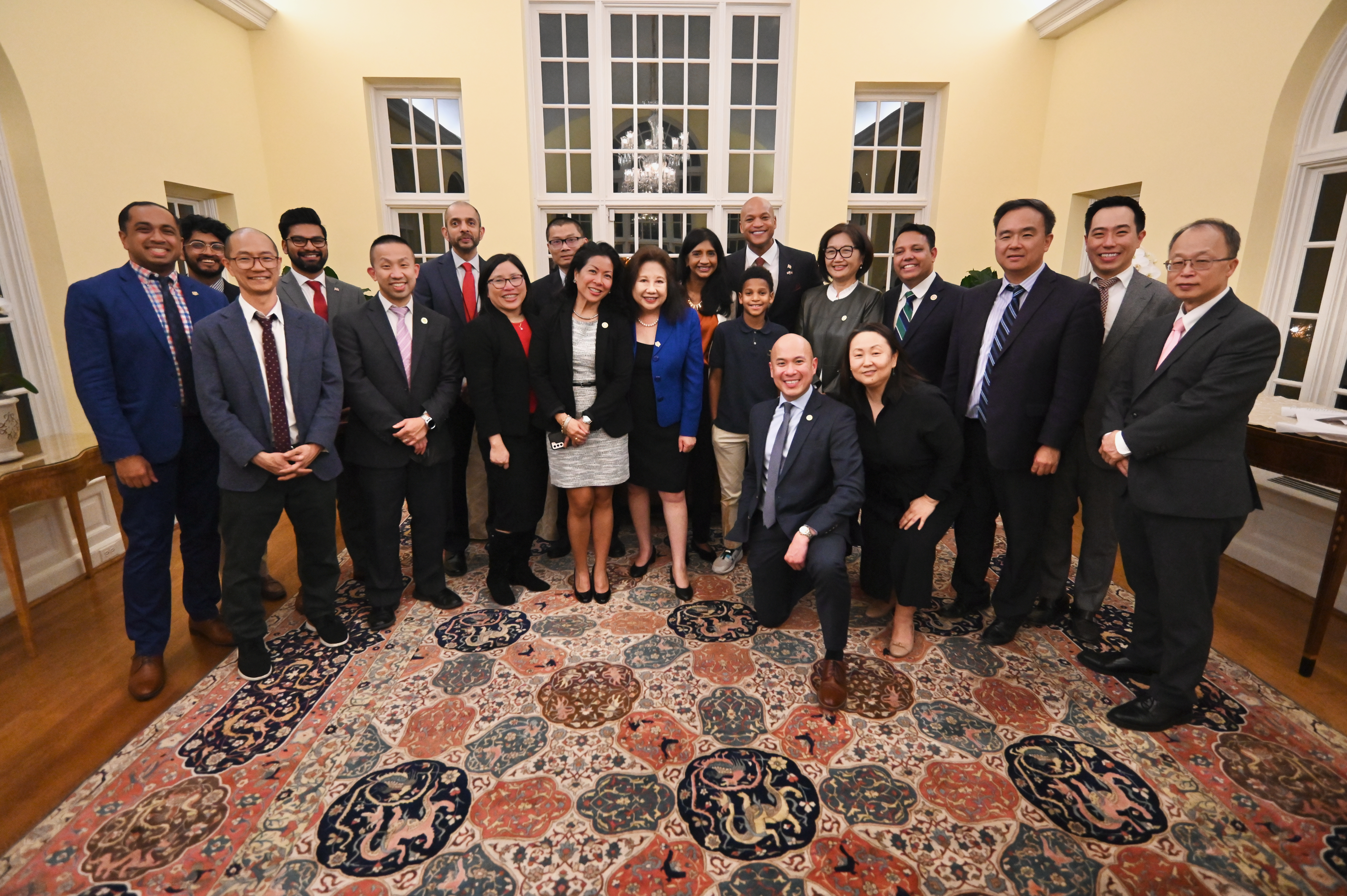
Bhandari and other members of the Asian-American and Pacific-Islander Caucus with Governor Wes Moore, 2023

Bhandari was sworn in on copies of Bhagavad Gita and Vedas on January 9, 2019, and has served as a member of the Health and Government Operations Committee during his entire tenure. He has also chaired the Maryland Legislative Asian-American and Pacific-Islander Caucus since 2023.

During the 2020 Democratic Party presidential primaries, Bhandari ran to serve as a delegate for Joe Biden at the 2020 Democratic National Convention. He again applied to run as a delegate to the 2024 Democratic National Convention, pledged to Biden, but was denied by the Maryland Democratic Party.

In January 2025, after state senator Kathy Klausmeier was elected Baltimore County Executive, Bhandari told Maryland Matters that he would apply to fill the remainder of Klausmeier's term in the Maryland Senate. The Baltimore County Democratic Central Committee voted unanimously to elect Carl W. Jackson to Klausmeier's seat on January 28, 2025.

=== 2024 U.S. House campaign ===
In January 2024, ahead of U.S. Representative Dutch Ruppersberger announcing that he would not run for re-election in 2024, Bhandari filed to run for Maryland's 2nd congressional district in the 2024 election. He officially announced his campaign on January 29. During the Democratic primary, Bhandari ran on a platform including healthcare and education. He was defeated in the Democratic primary election, placing second behind Baltimore County Executive Johnny Olszewski with 8.5 percent of the vote.

== Political positions ==
=== Education ===
During the 2023 legislative session, Bhandari introduced legislation requiring high schools to teach conflict resolution classes. The bill did not pass out of committee.

=== Environment ===
During the 2023 legislative session, Bhandari introduced legislation to encourage schools to install solar arrays in school construction projects.

=== Gun policy ===
During the 2020 legislative session, Bhandari voted against a bill requiring background checks for shotgun and rifle sales.

In June 2021, following the fatal shooting of Nepali student Sagar Ghimire in Woodlawn, Bhandari promised to introduce legislation to strengthen the state's gun control laws during the 2022 legislative session. That year, he introduced the Sagar Ghimire Act to reassess Maryland's extreme risk gun law.

During his 2024 congressional campaign, Bhandari supported federal legislation to ban assault weapon sales.

=== Foreign policy ===
During his 2024 congressional campaign, Bhandari supported a ceasefire in the Gaza war, comparing it to the Nepalese Civil War.

=== Health care ===
During the 2019 legislative session, Bhandari supported a bill to establish the Prescription Drug Affordability Board to negotiate the price of prescription drugs in Maryland.

During his 2024 congressional campaign, Bhandari endorsed the Medicare for All Act. He also introduced bills to create a task force on reducing emergency department wait times during that year's legislative session.

=== National politics ===
In May 2021, Bhandari called on Congress to pass the For the People Act.

=== Social issues ===
During the 2023 legislative session, Bhandari introduced legislation that would make the state recognize Dashain as a commemorative day. The bill passed and was signed into law by Governor Wes Moore, making Maryland the first U.S. state to recognize the festival.

In 2024, Bhandari introduced a bill that would require movie theaters to have limited screenings of movies with closed captioning and subtitle options.

== Personal life ==
Bhandari is married and has two children. He lives in Nottingham, Maryland. In September 2018, following the fatal shooting of Brindra Giri in Towson, Maryland, Bhandari helped Giri's family with funeral arrangements and with translating from Nepali to English.

== Electoral history ==
Maryland House of Delegates District 8 Democratic primary election, 2014
Party	Candidate	Votes	%
Democratic	Eric Bromwell (incumbent)	5,601	22.8
Democratic	Renee Smith	4,632	18.9
Democratic	Bill Paulshock	4,512	18.4
Democratic	Harry Bhandari	3,828	15.6
Democratic	Debbie Schillinger	3,124	12.7
Democratic	Steve Verch	1,752	7.1
Democratic	Kyle Williams	1,114	4.5

Maryland House of Delegates District 8 Democratic primary election, 2018
Party	Candidate	Votes	%
Democratic	Eric Bromwell (incumbent)	6,595	31.2
Democratic	Harry Bhandari	5,941	28.1
Democratic	Carl W. Jackson	5,246	24.8
Democratic	Joe Werner	3,335	15.8

Maryland House of Delegates District 8 election, 2018
Party	Candidate	Votes	%
Democratic	Eric Bromwell (incumbent)	22,485	18.0
Democratic	Harry Bhandari	22,094	17.7
Republican	Joseph C. Boteler III	20,802	16.7
Democratic	Carl Jackson	20,232	16.2
Republican	Joe Cluster (incumbent)	20,084	16.1
Republican	Joe Norman	18,898	15.2
Write-in		99	0.1

Maryland House of Delegates District 8 election, 2022
Party	Candidate	Votes	%
Democratic	Harry Bhandari (incumbent)	19,702	21.62
Democratic	Carl W. Jackson (incumbent)	18,950	20.79
Democratic	Nick Allen	18,062	19.82
Republican	Kathleen A. Smero	11,838	12.99
Republican	Timothy M. Neubauer	11,259	12.36
Republican	Glen Geelhaar	11,243	12.34
Write-in		74	0.08

Maryland's 2nd congressional district Democratic primary election, 2024
Party	Candidate	Votes	%
Democratic	Johnny Olszewski	65,994	78.7
Democratic	Harry Bhandari	7,148	8.5
Democratic	Sia Kyriakakos	4,079	4.9
Democratic	Sharron Reed-Burns	3,472	4.1
Democratic	Jessica Sjoberg	1,691	2.0
Democratic	Clint Spellman Jr.	1,466	1.8
