= Adrian Boafo =

American politician (born 1994)

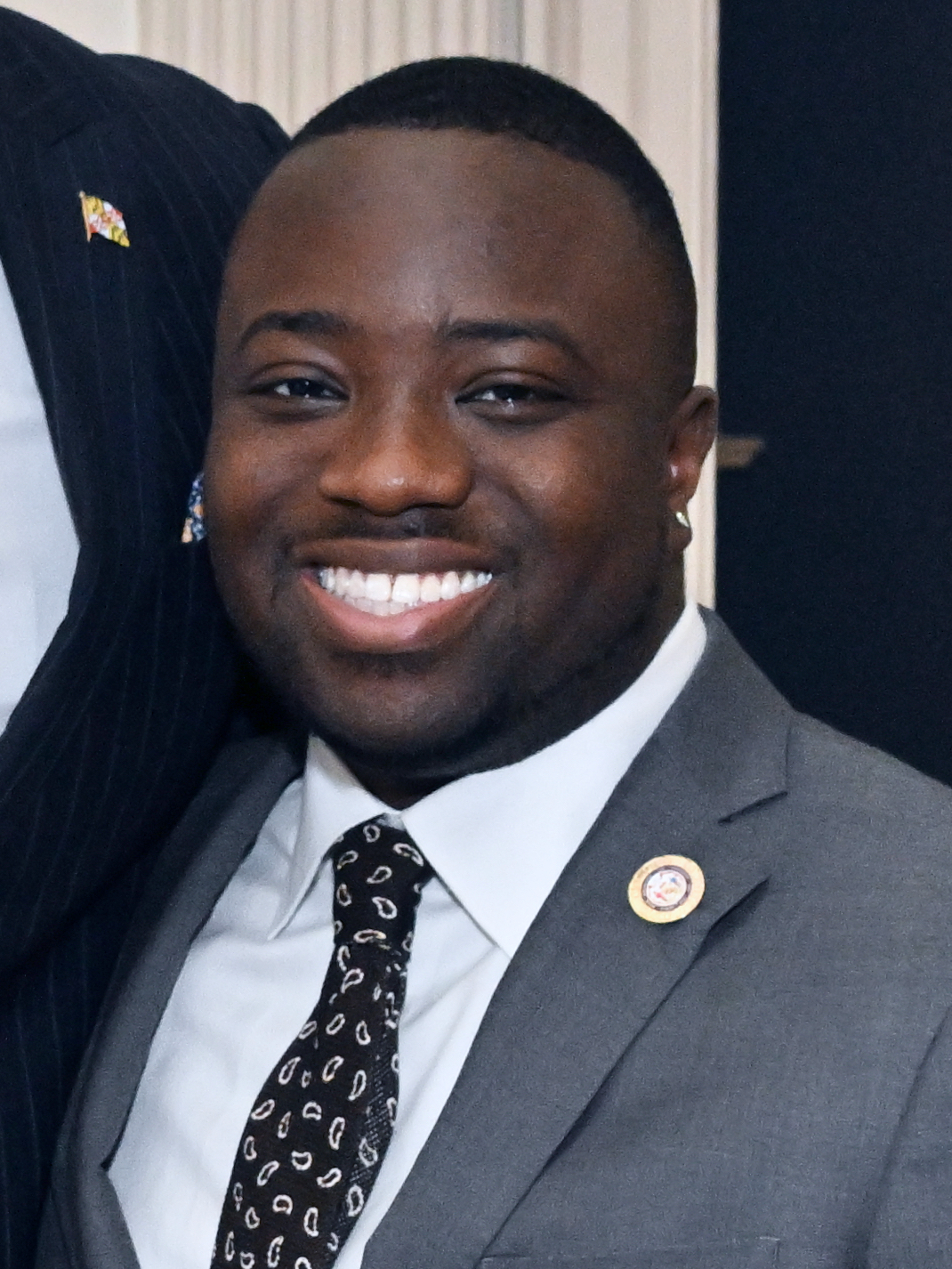
- Boafo in 2023

Member-elect of the U.S. House of Representatives from Maryland's 5th district
- Assuming office January 3, 2027
- Succeeding: Steny Hoyer

Member of the Maryland House of Delegates from the 23rd district
- Incumbent
- Assumed office January 11, 2023 Serving with Marvin E. Holmes Jr., Kym Taylor
- Preceded by: Geraldine Valentino-Smith

Mayor pro tempore of Bowie
- In office November 18, 2019 – January 11, 2023
- Preceded by: Henri Gardner
- Succeeded by: Roxy Ndebumadu

Personal details
- Born: Adrian Asiedu Boafo; May 10, 1994 (age 32) Arlington, Virginia, U.S.
- Party: Democratic
- Education: University of Baltimore (BA); American University (MBA)
- Website: Campaign website

Adrian Asiedu Boafo (/boʊɑːfoʊ/ BOW-ah-foe; born May 10, 1994) is an American politician who is the member-elect of the U.S. House of Representatives from Maryland's 5th congressional district. A member of the Democratic Party, he has served as a member of the Maryland House of Delegates from the 23rd district in Prince George's County, Maryland, since 2023.

Born in Virginia and raised in Maryland, Boafo graduated from the University of Baltimore and American University. He began his political career as a press staffer for U.S. representatives Xavier Becerra and Ruben Kihuen before becoming House Majority Leader Steny Hoyer's campaign manager. He was elected to the Bowie city council in 2019 and the Maryland House of Delegates in 2022.

== Early life and career ==
Boafo was born in Arlington, Virginia, on May 10, 1994. His parents were immigrants from Ghana who migrated to the United States in the 1980s after the country's democratic political systems collapsed.

Boafo graduated from DeMatha Catholic High School in 2012. He later attended the University of Baltimore, where he served as the president of the university's student government and received a Bachelor of Arts degree in government and public policy in 2016. Boafo was also appointed to serve as the vice president of undergraduate affairs on the University System of Maryland's student council. He also graduated from American University, receiving a Master of Business Administration degree in 2019.

After graduating, Boafo worked as a press intern for U.S. Representative Xavier Becerra and as a national press assistant for U.S. Representative Ruben Kihuen. He served as the campaign manager for House Majority leader Steny Hoyer from 2018 to 2021 and later worked as a federal lobbyist for Oracle.

== Early political career ==
=== Bowie mayor pro-tempore ===
Boafo filed to run for District 3 of the Bowie city council on May 8, 2019, challenging incumbent council member Darian Senn-Carter. Boafo won election to the Bowie city council on November 6, 2019, with 34.8 percent of the vote. Soon after, the council selected him to serve as the city's youngest mayor pro tempore, succeeding at-large council member Henri Gardner.

==== Development initiatives ====
In May 2020, Boafo voted to stop construction and cancel the city's contract to build a new ice rink, instead opting to build an indoor courts facility. In July 2020, Boafo voted against cancelling public-private partnership proposals to repair and operate Bowie's city-operated ice rink. After the city council voted to reject the proposals, it created a task force for the amenity. The task force unveiled its recommendations on January 19, 2021.

In January 2021, Boafo voted against a bill to support a preliminary plan for the Bowie's Mill Branch Crossing development.

In June 2021, Boafo introduced a bill to provide city residents with a rebate of up to $50 to install a new water filtration system. The City Council unanimously voted to pass the initiative. Later that month, the United States House Committee on Appropriations' Interior, Environment, and Related Agencies Subcommittee approved a $2 million request from the city to replace one mile of a tuberculated cast iron water main.

==== Policing ====
In 2019, Boafo included a budget line item in the city's budget to reimburse Bowie residents for installing outdoor cameras. In November 2020, Boafo and the Bowie Police Department launched a program to provide rebates up to $50 for residents who purchase and install a home security camera.

In June 2020, Boafo attended a vigil to honor George Floyd, Ahmaud Arbery, and Breonna Taylor at Allen Pond Park in Bowie.

=== Maryland House of Delegates ===
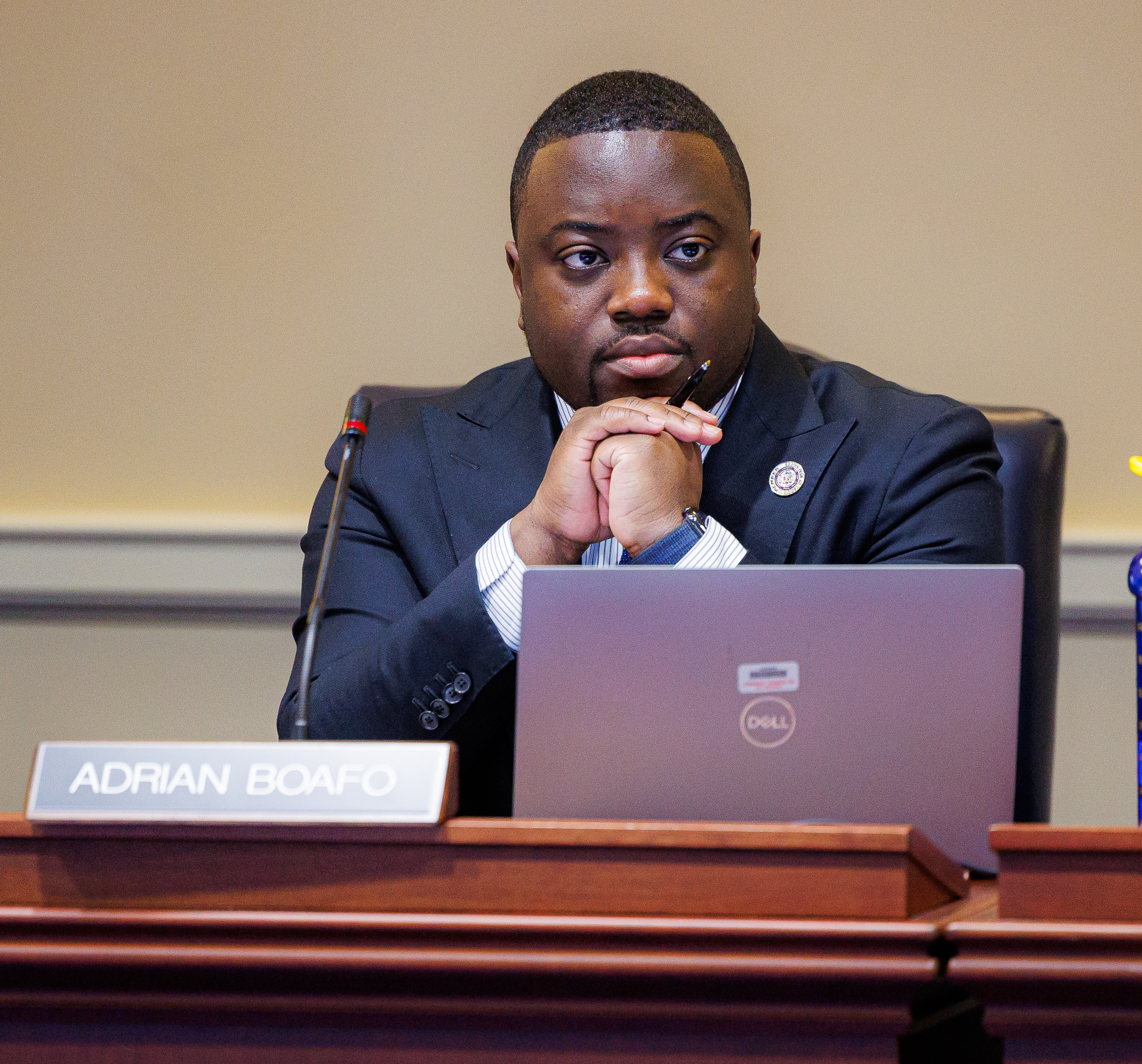
Boafo in the House Economic Matters Committee, 2025

Boafo announced he would run for the Maryland House of Delegates in District 23 on February 25, 2022. His campaign was endorsed by House Majority Leader Steny Hoyer. He won the Democratic primary on July 19, 2022, placing second with 14.4 percent of the vote.

Boafo was sworn into the Maryland House of Delegates on January 11, 2023. He was a member of the Economic Matters Committee. He was a delegate to the 2024 Democratic National Convention, pledged to Kamala Harris.

In September 2024, Boafo established his own federal political action committee, GenBlue PAC, to endorse liberal candidates running for Congress.

== U.S. House of Representatives ==
=== Elections ===
==== 2026 ====
On January 12, 2026, Boafo announced that he would run for the U.S. House of Representatives in Maryland's 5th congressional district, seeking to succeed Steny Hoyer, who retired. He was endorsed in the primary by Hoyer, Governor Wes Moore, and U.S. senator Angela Alsobrooks. During the campaign, Boafo supported proposals to raise the federal minimum wage and to increase support for small businesses. Boafo won the Democratic primary with 32.7 percent of the vote against over 20 opponents on June 23, 2026, and went on to defeat perennial candidate Chris Chaffee to win the general election.

=== Tenure ===
Boafo will be sworn into the U.S. House of Representatives on January 3, 2027.

== Political positions ==
=== Education ===
During the 2026 legislative session, Boafo introduced the Maryland Phone-Free Schools Act, which would restrict students' use of personal electronic devices and ban social media use during school hours.

=== Electoral reform ===
In August 2025, amid Republican efforts to redraw Texas's congressional districts to gain five congressional seats in the 2026 United States House of Representatives elections, Boafo supported redrawing Maryland's congressional districts to make Maryland's 1st congressional district more favorable to Democrats.

During his 2026 congressional campaign, Boafo supported repealing the U.S. Supreme Court's 2010 decision in Citizens United v. FEC.

=== Energy ===
In 2024, Boafo advocated requiring new buildings in Maryland to use electric heating systems rather than fossil-fuel heating, citing environmental concerns. He proposed retaining flexibility for gas cooking appliances and suggested that the requirements could be phased in, beginning with public and commercial buildings.

In January 2025, Boafo and fellow delegate Marlon Amprey called on the Maryland Public Service Commission to impose an immediate moratorium on utility rate increases, citing rising costs for Maryland households.

During the 2026 legislative session, Boafo supported the RENEW Act, which would have studied the environmental damage caused by fossil fuel companies. During his 2026 congressional campaign, he supported setting federal standards on data centers, including what kinds of battery energy storage systems and clean energy sources are involved and increased transparency in the permitting process.

=== Federal workers ===
In October 2026, Boafo supported launching federal investigations into Elon Musk and the Department of Government Efficiency if elected to Congress. He also described supporting federal workers and pledged to pursue the restoration of federal jobs in Maryland, calling it "the most important issue in my district, without a question".

=== Healthcare ===
During his 2026 congressional campaign, Boafo supported Medicare for All with a private option, as well as universal childcare.

=== Immigration ===
During the 2026 legislative session, Boafo introduced a bill that would prohibit United States Immigration and Customs Enforcement (ICE) officers hired during the second Trump administration from applying to become Maryland law enforcement officers in the future. In November 2026, Boafo condemned the detention of Maria Flores Garcia, a 19-year-old college freshman at the University of Maryland, College Park, and her mother by ICE, saying that they "should never have been put in this situation" and calling for congressional oversight of ICE.

=== Israel ===
Boafo supports Israel–United States relations, but is critical of Israeli Prime Minister Benjamin Netanyahu.

In October 2024, on the one-year anniversary of the October 7 attacks, Boafo wrote an op-ed in The Washington Post in which he expressed support for the Jewish community and the Black-Jewish alliance. During the 2025 legislative session, Boafo introduced legislation to ban "masked intimidation", citing the use of face coverings among anti-Israel protesters to obscure their identity and cause disturbances.

During his 2026 congressional campaign, Boafo supported strengthening Israel–United States relations and ensuring the country "has the security assistance it needs to defend itself". He also supported increasing humanitarian aid to Palestinian civilians.

=== Labor and wages ===
During the 2024 legislative session, Boafo introduced legislation that would create a constitutional referendum that would abolish sub-minimum wages in Maryland. During the 2025 legislative session, he introduced legislation that would create a constitutional referendum that would, if approved by voters, raise Maryland's minimum wage to $20 an hour, eliminate sub-minimum wages, and eliminate taxes on tips. In 2026, Boafo introduced the Maryland Raise the Wage Act, which proposed increasing the state's minimum wage to $25 per hour and eliminating all sub-minimum wages.

In September 2026, Boafo attended labor rallies in support of passing the Protecting the Right to Organize Act and measures addressing worker misclassification and wages.

== Personal life ==
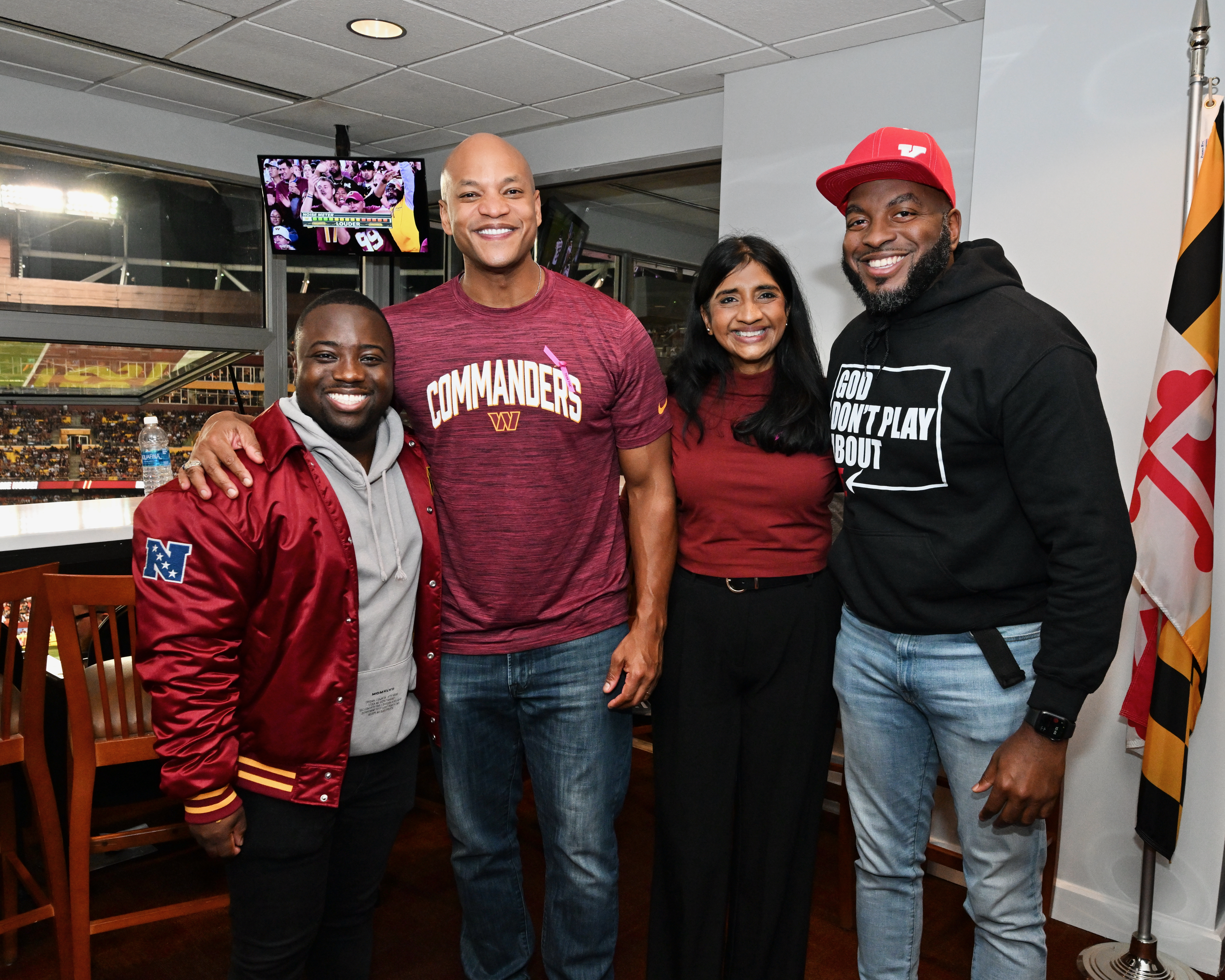
Boafo at a Washington Commanders football game with Governor Wes Moore, Lieutenant Governor Aruna Miller, and state delegate Kevin Harris.

Boafo is a Catholic.

== Electoral history ==
Bowie City Council District 3 election, 2019
Candidate	Votes	%
Adrian Boafo	713	34.8
Mike Byrd	660	32.2
David Grogan	331	16.2
Darian Senn-Carter (incumbent)	193	9.4
Kevin Motley	148	7.2
Write-in	2	0.1

Maryland House of Delegates District 23 Democratic primary election, 2022
Party	Candidate	Votes	%
Democratic	Marvin E. Holmes, Jr. (incumbent)	10,382	16.2
Democratic	Adrian Boafo	9,237	14.4
Democratic	Kym Taylor	8,957	14.0
Democratic	Jocelyn Irene Collins	8,938	13.9
Democratic	Monica Roebuck	7,609	11.9
Democratic	Keenon James	6,104	9.5
Democratic	Remi Duyile	3,888	6.1
Democratic	Januari McKay	3,784	5.9
Democratic	Valeria Tomlin	2,630	4.1
Democratic	Jacqui Steele-McCall	2,575	4.0

Maryland House of Delegates District 23 election, 2022
Party	Candidate	Votes	%
Democratic	Marvin E. Holmes Jr.	36,506	33.89
Democratic	Kym Taylor	36,399	33.80
Democratic	Adrian Boafo	33,843	31.42
Write-in		957	0.89

U.S. House of Representatives
Preceded by Steny Hoyer	Member of the U.S. House of Representatives from Maryland's 5th congressional district Taking office 2027	Elect
