= Community Associations Institute =

HOA trade association

Logo of the Community Associations Institute

The Community Associations Institute (CAI) is an organization that represents homeowners, condominiums, and other community associations around the world. Based in Falls Church, Virginia in the United States, the CAI has more than 60 chapters of condominium and homeowner associations with over 45,000 members worldwide. The CAI provides education and resources to help the volunteer leaders and boards that govern community associations. It also advocates for laws and regulations that benefit community associations and their members. CAI allows community associations to join together and have a unified voice.

Founded in 1973, the organization has sought to be the people that build and service common interest developments (CIDs) to become a significant force in interest group politics in many states. According to Evan McKenzie, they are dominated by lawyers and property managers that have shaped legislative and judicial policy-making to prevent meaningful regulation of CID activity and help keep the discourse on such matters largely private.

In the absence of legislative regulation or oversight perceived as meaningful to their objectives, the idea of residential private government took the shape and was advocated originally by developers through the Urban Land Institute and the Federal Housing Administration, followed by lawyers and property managers through the CAI.

CAI has worked to address concerns raised about the development industry by critics. Board and manager training classes and national certifications for core competency have been developed. The Institute has shifted its primary focus to asset management.

== See also ==
- Association law
- Community association
- Condominium
- List of condominiums in the United States
