= Maryland House Bill 107 =

Maryland state law on reserve studies

Maryland General Assembly
- Long title: An act concerning Cooperative Housing Corporations, Condominiums, and Homeowners Associations - Reserve Studies - Statewide
- Citation: House Bill 107
- Enacted by: Maryland House of Delegates
- Enacted by: Maryland State Senate
- Commenced: October 1, 2022

Legislative history

Initiating chamber: Maryland House of Delegates
- Introduced by: Marvin E. Holmes Jr.
- Passed: March 29, 2022
- Voting summary: 44 Maryland Senators voted for; 0 Maryland Senators voted against

Revising chamber: Maryland State Senate
- Passed: April 4, 2022
- Voting summary: 90 Maryland Delegates voted for; 37 Maryland Delegates voted against
- Status: In force

Maryland House Bill 107, also known as HB107, is a Maryland state law passed in 2022 that mandates that condominiums, housing associations, cooperatives, and homeowner associations complete a reserve study by October 1, 2023. The law, passed in response to the Surfside condominium collapse, is most notable for expanding the existing law on reserve studies, which only applied to Montgomery County and Prince George's County, to the entire state, requiring community associations three fiscal years to "attain the annual reserve funding level" recommended by the study and giving the board of directors of each association the power to "increase assessments" to fund such a study, overriding any bylaws or other governing documents capping assessment increases. It became law without the signature of Governor Larry Hogan.

== Provisions ==
The law requires community associations, specifically cooperative housing corporations and residential condominiums, established on or after October 2022, to conduct reserve studies, then update those studies every five years. The legislation also requires associations to annually fund the reserve amount, for repairs and maintenance, recommended in the reserve study, for the study to be publicly available for inspection by any unit owner, and to attain the annual recommended level of reserve funding within three years of the initial study's completion, with no exemptions based on association size "or number of condominium units."

Furthermore, the law defines the specifics of a reserve study, mandates reserve studies of "common area components" every five years (for those associations without a reserve study after October 2018), requires that the level of reserves be included in the annual budget, and gives association boards the power to raise money for the reserve fund regardless of governing documents restricting or capping assessment increases. The legislation's broad language says that common-area components are important “structural, mechanical, electrical, and plumbing” components that need to be replaced. The law also outlines four requirements for those who can prepare reserve studies.

The bill does not identify funding methods for which the capital for the reserve fund needs to be collected. Reserve Advisors, an engineering firm, notes that the funding recommendations of the reserve study do not have to be followed, but advised homeowner associations to not "forgo meeting the funding recommendations" In contrast, the Maryland Attorney General stated that reserves must be budgeted "in accordance" with the reserve study and other commercial organizations stated that funding for reserves is "mandatory" or "required." Commercial condominiums and homeowners associations with costs of purchase and installation costs of common components under $10,000 are not impacted by the law.

Similar provisions were included in the 2020 Maryland reserve study law applying to Prince George's County and Montgomery County, with this law expanding those requirements to make them applicable statewide.

== Debate ==
=== Support ===
==== Politicians ====
In October 2021, Marvin E. Holmes Jr. described reserve studies as necessary because of complaints by association members that they are hit with huge special assessments because there aren't "enough funds in their reserve accounts" and argued that the bill would "help protect against those scenarios." Holmes has been described as a "staunch supporter" of greater oversight of HOAs and condo associations and a "housing guru" in the Maryland General Assembly. Previously, the Maryland General Assembly failed to adopt statewide legislation mandating reserve studies, but adopted similar legislation for Prince George's County in 2020 and Montgomery County in 2021. Holmes also helped write those reserve studies laws.

==== Organizations and other individuals ====
A few government entities favored the legislation. The Maryland Department of the Environment argued that the bill's requirements would be beneficial for the agency, providing additional financial security and diligence "better ensuring" that public health and the environment "are protected." The agency later stated that the law related to programs of the agency's Land and Materials Administration. The Montgomery County, Maryland Department of Housing and Community Affairs Commission on Common Ownership Communities also favored the law, calling reserve studies critical to avoiding emergencies for community associations and a "little financial pain" which leads to "lower costs" in future, noting that special assessments or projects will need to be scrapped, and that "unexpected fees" implemented by association boards can be "disruptive...and are difficult to get passed."

The Attorney General of Maryland supported the law. The Consumer Council, a subdivision of the Maryland Attorney General's office, called the law "warranted," argued that smaller communities are "unlikely to be overburdened by this law," and stated that the law could protect against "very high assessments" being implemented on unit owners or a disaster like the Surfside condominium collapse from happening in Maryland. Another subdivision, the Consumer Protection Division, also favored the legislation.

Some homeowners and condo owners favored the law, stating that it would lead to "appreciation of Homeowner properties" or that state-wide mandate for reserve studies would push governing boards to adequately plan "for short term or long-term projects". Previously, in June 2021, the Baltimore Sun editorial board voiced their support for making the reserve study law, applicable to Prince George's and Montgomery counties, apply statewide, arguing that unit owners will sleep better when there are "periodical assessments of maintenance needs," but said that it should not be "unduly burdensome."

Other organizations only favored the law with amendments. The Community Associations Institute considered the law one of their priorities, and said that having up-to-date reserves makes associations "attractive to owners, lenders, and avoiding the need for special assessments." In a letter to Delegate Kumar P. Barve, CAI noted their support for the legislation, but called for building "flexibility into proposed legislation," revising the legislation to include residential and non-residential condominiums, and noted concern about "enforcement of a statewide reserve mandate." Scott Silverman of the CAI argued that despite the financial burden, the law is "something that ultimately we believe will prevent catastrophic loss," while noting that "there is nowhere else to go for the money but the residents." The Maryland Building Industry Association also noted that they supported the legislation, but called for an amendment which gave associations flexibility to make decisions regarding reserve funding and for exceptions as to what associations the bill should applicable to.

=== Opposition ===
In an op-ed in July 2021, Arthur T. Johnson argued that the law would "impose an unnecessary cost" on many common ownership communities (COC) and "a boon" for some engineering firms and create "significant financial hardship for many COCs and their members." Instead, he called for local government to regulate COCs, rather than state government, having county government determine building safety, and county inspections rather than "expensive 5-year reserve studies." The bill Johnson referred to, House Bill 313, was a similar bill also mandating reserve studies, introduced in 2021, but never passed the Maryland General Assembly, with lobbying against the bill by CAI members. A commentary by Independent American Communities, in 2022 claimed that the CAI's reserve specialists will "personally profit" from the law's new requirements.

== Legislative history ==
The legislation was pre-filed with the Maryland House of Delegates on September 29, 2021. It was amended by the Environment and Transportation Committee and later by the Judicial Proceedings Committee. On March 29, 2022, the Maryland Senate voted unanimously in favor of the legislation, with three members absent.

The Maryland House of Delegates concurred with the Senate's amendments and passed the legislation on April 4, 2022, by a vote of 90–39, with six not voting and six absent. Those who voted against it included Christopher T. Adams, Carl Anderton Jr., Steven J. Arentz, Lauren Arikan, Wendell R. Beitzel, Joseph C. Boteler III, and Jason C. Buckel. Some argued that the law only received momentum after the Surfside collapse, with Scott Silverman of the Community Associations Institute saying “they needed the fear of that kind of disaster in Maryland to persuade everyone that a statewide bill was necessary."

The law went into effect on October 1, 2022.

== Aftermath ==
=== Economic impact ===
In October 2023, OC Today reported that the law was impacting condominium owners in Ocean City, Maryland, and across Maryland, with unit owners facing "five-to-six digit bills over the next few years" to meet the law's deadlines, which require a reserve fund for repairs and maintenance. Other media reported that condominium owners in Ocean City were "grappling with substantial financial obligations" as a result of the law. Some firms predicted that the law could put pressure on housing prices and result in a potential rise in "significant special assessments," large shortfalls for reserves, and result in an influx of units sold. One insurance company that favored the law noted that the law may seem "a bit tough on associations" and result in a "short-term struggle" for certain associations. Kathleen Dartez, the legal affairs director of the Maryland Association of Realtors, stated that condo buyers should anticipate that "a special assessment or increase in monthly charges will be imposed" on condominium unit owners to build up the required reserve fund. In addition, the Maryland Association of Realtors added a "Condominium/HOA Reserve Study Disclosure" to their consumer notice for buyers of residential real estate in the state.

In December 2023, residents of Tudor Arms Apartments in Baltimore's Wyman Park told The Baltimore Banner that the law had been on "everyone's mind," that some people aren't going to be able to pay for the increased fees as a result of the law, and that they wish "there could have been a longer period of time" to fill the required reserve. The Baltimore Banner also noted that the law is an issue for smaller associations that can't raise the necessary funds quickly enough to fulfill regulatory requirements, especially if many residents cannot "readily contribute" the large amounts needed. Lawyers, such as Bruce Brown and Jason Cook, told the publication that the bill had "good intentions" but there was a "lack of understanding" as to the impact of the legislation on residents and community associations, with volunteer board members "under the gun" to require their neighbors to pay "dramatic fee increases from their neighbors" and that the law's biggest impact would be on buildings without "proper reserves." Real estate agent Jeff Nelson argued that the law is mainly an issue for buildings that haven't been maintaining necessary reserves, while J.D. Russell of HPS Management said that regulatory compliance for some associations will be impossible in the short-term. Others had concerns that the law could impact the "resale value" of properties within community associations, with lenders not providing financing for those units with underfunded reserves, while higher fees and assessments could make some units less financially attractive, "pushing down prices."

In November 2024, residents of the Rockland Run condominium community, of 241 units, in Baltimore County, shared their concerns with The Baltimore Banner about rising costs, including a 15% raise in dues and a "$250,000 special assessment" that has to be split among residents, and noted that one resident asked the Maryland Office of the Attorney General for help, but was told that property manager refused to "participate in mediation or turn over audits and other documents she requested." Some residents quoted said they were considering leaving to avoid higher financial costs and reported mismanagement, while the community's property manager criticized concerns about residents, and the community's president said skepticism about the board and management were incorrect and recommended those dissenting "use the annual election process to make changes." The article also noted that the community's reserve account had been depleted to about $30,000, leading to the special assessment.

In March 2025, the Baltimore Sun noted there had been calls to change the existing state law due to rising condominium fees, and described the latter as "especially burdensome" for senior citizens.

=== Enforcement ===
It was reported in December 2023 that the Maryland Attorney General's consumer protection division could take "enforcement action" against community associations in noncompliance. Some noted that associations not in compliance could "face civil penalties."

=== Amendments ===
A law which would have extended the time-frame for associations to comply with the amount stated in the reserve study from 3 to 5 years, after the first reserve study, did not pass in the 2023 legislative session of the Maryland General Assembly. In December 2023 it was reported that Del. Holmes was working to pass an amended law in the 2024 legislative session, to clear up "confusion," including new legislation to increase the time community associations are required "to fill their funds." Others called for a "some kind of funding mechanism" to help some community associations "fill their reserve funds".

On January 21, 2025, the Baltimore County Council approved a resolution, unanimously, requesting that representatives for the county's districts in the Maryland General Assembly amend the law, providing common-ownership communities "more time to conduct reserve studies," specifically giving these communities five years to collect the fees, rather than three years, and to change the law to reflect "different needs of the communal associations." During the 2025 legislative session, the Maryland General Assembly passed legislation, sponsored by C. Anthony Muse in the Maryland Senate (SB 63) and Marvin E. Holmes Jr. in the Maryland House (HB 292), which revised HB 107. The bill requires that a budget include funding "in accordance with the reserve study" with a mandate that condominiums, homeowner associations, and housing cooperatives develop a funding plan determining how reserve study recommends would be funded, while making a provision for financial hardship which "makes full funding of reserve amounts not possible" for a one-year period by a two-thirds vote of unit owners, which can be renewed under certain circumstances.

The Community Associations Institute stated that their Maryland Legislative Action Committee had "spearheaded and supported" the legislation, working with Marvin Holmes on the bill's introduction, and called it an "advocacy success". The Maryland Relators Association and Maryland Builders Association stated their support for the legislation. In his letter to constituents following the session, C. Anthony Muse said that the legislation made "key improvements" to the statutes governing funding plans and reserve studies for housing cooperative, condominiums, and homeowners associations, and described the changes as vital for "ensuring the long-term financial health and sustainability of common ownership communities throughout the state." Maryland Delegate Marc Korman also argued that the legislation put in place new requirements creating flexibility and maximizing "safety while maintaining affordability for residents." The legislation was signed into law by Governor Wes Moore on May 13, 2025 and will go into effect on October 1, 2025.
