= Reserve study =

Budgeting tool

In real estate, a reserve study is a long-term capital budget planning tool which identifies the current status of the reserve fund and a stable and equitable funding plan to offset ongoing deterioration, resulting in sufficient funds when those anticipated major common area expenditures actually occur. The reserve study consists of two parts: the physical analysis and the financial analysis. This document is best prepared by an outside independent consultant for the benefit of administrators (Board of Directors or Strata Council Members) of a property with multiple owners, such as a condominium association or homeowners' association (HOA), strata, containing an assessment of the state of the commonly owned property components as determined by the particular association's covenants, conditions, and restrictions (CC&Rs) and bylaws. Reserve studies however are not limited only to condominiums and can be created for any "common interest community" (CIC) properties such as resort (shared vacation ownership) properties, community/neighborhood associations, coops, etc.

Reserve studies are in essence planning tools designed to help the board anticipate, and prepare for, the property's predictable major repair and replacement projects. For example, such projects would include: replacement of the roof on the building(s), replacement of the boiler, retrofit of the fire alarm devices, and resurfacing of the roadways.

In some jurisdictions across Canada, a reserve study is also sometimes referred to as a "reserve fund study", "contingency reserve fund study", or "replacement reserve study" and, in British Columbia, the legislation refers to this type of study as a "Depreciation Report".

== Purpose ==
The purpose of a reserve study is to give those overseeing the maintenance of the property a better idea of what major expenses to expect and an educated estimate of when these expenses will occur. With this knowledge, the homeowners' association board or manager can create a budget so association members will offset ongoing deterioration with ongoing reserve funding^{†}, designed such that the cash is available to accomplish these major upcoming projects in a timely manner. There is no reason for leadership to be surprised by the need to perform major building repair or replacement projects that deteriorated often in plain sight and over a number of years. In addition, the reserve study provides important annual disclosures to association members (and prospective buyers) about the condition of common area components, and the level of preparedness (strength) of the reserve fund (typically measured in terms of Percent funded). A HOA reserve study is a roadmap that allows decisions to be made which will be efficient and effective for the long term. The International Capital Budgeting Institute has established standards for calculating percent funded. There are three methods of making this calculation, and differences between reserve practitioners can, unfortunately, result in significant differences in the percent funded amount.

(† : It is important to account for inflation and interest earned in Reserve Study Funding Plans, as these effects are often very significant.

A reserve study for CICs should:

1. Provide budgeting information that gives some theoretical assurance that when common element replacement projects are due, sufficient funds will have been assessed to pay for them without special assessments (preferably without significant over-funding).
2. Fairly distribute inflated costs for replacement projects among owners, in proportion to their percent ownership of common elements (as defined in their association documents) for the duration of that ownership, as measured either in any year's constant dollars or in hours to earn at any pay rate assuming owner pay inflates at the same rate as component replacement costs.
3. Give a theoretically accurate percent funded based on the amount of Reserve cash on-hand, and the cash value of common area deterioration.

== Results ==
There are three results from a reserve study:

1. A listing of the major components of the association to be funded through reserves, their expected useful life, remaining useful life, and current replacement cost (yielding the "scope and schedule" of the reserve projects).
2. An evaluation of the current strength of the reserve fund (commonly expressed as "percent funded").
3. A recommended multi-year reserve funding plan.

== Relevance ==
Reserve studies are required by the board or manager for due diligence, disclosure, and budget and planning purposes. An increasing number of U.S. states and Canadian provinces today require some form of reserve planning or disclosures. In addition to requiring a minimum 10% of the total budget be dedicated to reserve contributions, Fannie Mae and the Federal Housing Administration may ask for a current reserve studies (to demonstrate that the association has dedicated sufficient funds to caring for the ongoing needs of the property) to be approved for FHA insured loans and Fannie Mae lending products and services.

=== State reserve studies ===
In addition to being helpful planning tools, reserve studies for Community Associations are legally mandated in 30 states (such as California, Florida, Hawaii, Nevada, Virginia, Washington, etc.), either for budget preparation or homeowner (and prospective homeowner) disclosure purposes. In California, the relevant law is California Civil Code 5300. In California, the law requires an annual reserve study Update, with that update prepared on the basis of a "diligent visual site inspection" at least every third year. With the passing of SB 278 in 2010, the state of Utah also requires condominium and community associations to conduct and review reserve studies on a periodic basis. reserve contributions are often one of an association's largest budget line items (often 15-40% of the total budget), and the reserve fund is typically the association's largest financial asset. This means annual review of reserve contributions and annual disclosure of the status of the reserve fund are prudent.

The State of Nevada has adopted specific statutes related to reserve studies, which are set forth in NRS 116. These statutes also require that reserve preparers in Nevada be registered and background checked by the State Department of Real Estate (advised by reservestudy.org?).

In October 2022, Maryland adopted House Bill 107, which requires community associations to conduct reserve studies, then update those studies every five years. The legislation also requires associations to annually fund the reserve amount, for repairs and maintenance, recommended in the reserve study, for the study to be publicly available for inspection by any unit owner, and to attain the annual recommended level of reserve funding within three years of the initial study's completion, with no exemptions based on association size "or number of condominium units."

=== International Capital Budgeting Institute ===
Since Reserve Studies help associations make fiscally responsible decisions, navigating to a successful future, a consistent high quality of Reserve Studies is desired. While foundational Reserve Study industry standards have existed since 1998 (see and), a small group has proposed a new set of standards. While intended as progress, as-of this writing, these 2015 standards have yet to be embraced or adopted by the industry as a whole. For more see The International Capital Budgeting Institute (ICBI).

=== US FHA ===
On June 30, 2011, the Department of Housing and Urban Development published Mortgagee Letter 2011-22, which made reserve studies mandatory for all new condominium conversions applying for FHA insured loans approval, including gut and non-gut rehabilitation conversions. This new guideline went into effect September 1, 2011. Condominiums must demonstrate that at least 10% of the yearly assessment income be dedicated towards reserve contributions. The FHA enforces the 10% budget line item requirement nationally by prohibiting lending in developments that are non-compliant with this requirement. Additionally, Mortgagee Letter 2011-22 stipulates all other condominiums requesting FHA project approval may be required to submit a current (completed within the last 24 months) reserve study at their discretion or whenever financial documents do not appear to meet sufficient funding requirements of the condominium association.

=== Fannie Mae ===
On December 1, 2010, Fannie Mae published Announcement SEL 2010-16. The new guidelines outlined in the announcement went into effect March 1, 2011. The guidelines made reserve studies mandatory for all newly converted, non-gut rehabilitation condominium developments to be eligible Fannie Mae project approval. All other types of condominiums have the option to submit a compliant reserve study or must add a budget line item for reserves equal to 10% of the yearly assessment income.

=== Canada ===
In Canada the legislation governing condominium and strata corporations is provincial. There are no national standards conducting reserve professionals with respect to conduct, reporting, methodology, calculation formula other than those of specific professional organizations. The absence of a national organization of reserve planner professionals has resulted in reserve study reports containing vital financial information being prepared using simplistic spread sheet applications and forecasts which are not compliant with financial reporting requirements of Financial Reporting & Assurance Standards Canada.

A Reserve fund study is a financial document which is likely to be reviewed by an auditor and must meet these standards. The reserve fund study also requires technical expertise with respect to building structure and systems. It is for this reason that these reports are primarily prepared by engineers, architects, appraisers, building inspectors etc. The Capital Budgeting process with respect to reserve management planning has clarified in the International Capital Budgeting Institutes (ICBI) Generally Accepted Reserve Study Standards published April 2015.

The ICBI reserve study standards are very specific with respect to the information to be contained in the report and the calculation methods used in providing financial forecasts. The standards are also specific as to the software used to create the financial forecasts. A reserve professional providing reserve study/depreciation reports which comply with these standards must use the formulas provided by ICBI.

== Funding methods and goals ==
There are several reserve study funding methods and goals. These methods may be used to develop a funding strategy that corresponds with the risk tolerance of the community. In National Reserve Study Standards terminology, there are two basic ways to calculate contributions: "Cash Flow" or "Component" (also known as "Straight Line"). In the same National reserve study Standard terminology, there are four funding objectives: Full funding, Threshold funding, Baseline funding, and Statutory funding. Due to its greater computational flexibility and its ability to allow the user to focus on and achieve any of the four funding Objectives, the "Cash Flow" Method has seen significant growth in popularity. The four Funding Goals (excerpted from National Reserve Study Standards, or in a document expounding on those standards, are as follows:

- "Full Funding" is pursuing the goal where the Reserve Fund Balance will equal (or closely approximate) the value of Reserve component deterioration (the "Fully Funded Balance").
- "Baseline funding" describes the goal to have sufficient reserves on hand to never completely run out of money. This is sometimes described as a "cash-positive" plan. With less cash in reserves on-deposit, associations with a baseline funding objective have higher instances of special assessments and/or deferred maintenance.
- "Threshold funding" describes a goal chosen by the board other than the 100% (Full funding) level or just staying cash-positive (Baseline funding). This may be a specific Percent Funded target or a cash balance target. Threshold funding is often a value chosen in between Full funding and Baseline funding.

All funding goals are designed to meet exactly the same expenses outlined in the reserve component list. Thus the expenditures are identical, only the size of the reserve fund through the years is different. This means the size of reserve contributions between different reserve funding objectives is often relatively small (typically only 10–15%).

== Qualifications and levels of service ==
Reserve studies can be created by volunteer board members, their professional managers, obtained through a variety of professionals specializing in the preparation of reserve studies, or large architectural or engineering firms who complete reserve studies as a small aspect of their larger business. Recently, certification criteria have been created to allow for a more ordered system of identifying those individuals who have been specifically trained in the creation of reserve studies. One such certification, that of Reserve Specialist (RS), is available through the Community Associations Institute (CAI). To obtain this certification, candidates must have prepared at least 30 reserve studies within the past 3 calendar years, hold a bachelor's degree in construction management, architecture, or engineering (or something equivalent based on experience and education), and complied with various other rules and codes of conducts.

Another credential is the Professional Reserve Analyst (PRA), created and promoted by the reserve study industry's own trade organization, the Association of Professional Reserve Analysts (APRA). The PRA was the first accrediting body for Reserve Professionals. The PRA credential is similar in that it takes years, demonstrated experience, and compliance with standardized terminology to obtain although the experience levels are a bit higher than that required for the RS and their efforts include studies both inside and outside of the homeowner association industry. APRA also requires its PRAs to maintain proficiency with continuing education.

In Canada there are several designations and training programs. The Real Estate Institute of Canada (REIC) offers the Certified Reserve Planner (CRP) program, which is the only nationally accepted specialty designation listed in provincial (some provinces) legislation as qualified. Members of the Appraisal Institute of Canada (AIC) must use the methodology and standards of the REIC program if they wish to complete the report. This includes preparing a Benchmark Analysis and rating the reserve fund as a percent funded.

The Canadian National Association of Real Estate Appraisers(CNAREA)offers the Designated Reserve Planner (DRP) program to designated appraiser members since 2012. The DRP designation requires demonstrated experience and compliance with standardized terminology and methodology to obtain. All DRP designated planners are required to use the RFA Pro Reserve Fund Analysis software or provide a quality assurance report of their chosen calculation methods. Applied Science Technologists & Technicians of British Columbia (ASTTBC) offers the Registered Reserve Fund Analysts (RRFA) training program to Home inspectors, as home inspectors are restricted from completing Depreciation Reports / Reserve Studies in their bylaws. As of 2013, Sauder School of Business Real Estate Division is offering the first of 2 courses towards a certification called the Reserve Fund Planning Program (RFPP), but yet no trade group has recognized this designation.

There are three types of reserve studies based on standards set by the Association of Professional Reserve Analysts and Community Associations Institute, differing in how exhaustively the Physical Analysis is conducted. These three types of reserve studies allow the association to select the "Level of Service" appropriate to their current budget preparation and disclosure needs. Listed beginning with the most exhaustive, they are:

1. '′"Full" reserve study' (creation of the reserve study, involving creation of the component list, measuring/quantifying all reserve components, and development of the Useful Life, Remaining Useful Life, and Current Replacement Cost based on a diligent, visual on-site inspection). Note that for most associations, a "Full" reserve study only needs to be done once. After a "Full" reserve study has been done, in subsequent years the association can choose between the two reserve study update options shown below:
2. "Update With-Site-Visit" reserve study (an update of an existing reserve study involving a diligent visual on-site inspection, but presuming that all components have been properly identified and quantified). This type of update is often performed every two to five years.
3. "Update No-Site-Visit" reserve study (an update of an existing reserve study without a site inspection, done by client interviews and interviews with knowledgeable vendors and service providers). This type of update is typically performed in the years in-between With-Site-Visit updates.

In addition to the above types of Reserve Studies, note that there are different levels of professional engagement. These typically fall into the categories of independently prepared reserve studies, an integrated Reserve management plan, or a Consulting engagement.

== Typically excluded common area components ==
Some common area components may have been left out of your reserve study or been included in the component list as an “excluded item” and not been funded for. These components will typically fall into one or more of the categories listed below.

Below threshold costs - Component repair and/or replacement costs that are deemed too small to be considered capital expenses and are typically included in the operational or maintenance budget of the association have not been funded for in this study. Minimal threshold costs are determined by the Association or by you Reserve Analysts based on the typical minimal threshold costs for similar sized associations.

Operational expenses - These occur at least annually and can be effectively budgeted for each year. They are characterized as being reasonably predictable both in terms of frequency and cost. Operational expenses include all minor expenses which would not otherwise adversely affect an operational budget from one year to the next.

Very long or unpredictable useful life expectancy - Components which, when properly maintained, have a very long useful life and which cannot be accurately predicted, have been excluded from this reserve report. These components may require maintenance and upkeep which is typically funded from the operational budget of the association.

Unit improvements - Improvements made to the property that fall within the Governing Documents’ unit description summary (owners responsibility), are not typically considered to be community owned or the responsibility of the association.

Other non-association owned - Improvements installed on the property but which are owned by other parties such as governmental agencies, utility companies, the US Postal Service, etc., are not included in this reserve study. The replacement and maintenance of these improvements are not typically the responsibility of the association.

Additionally, budgeting is normally excluded for repairs or replacements of assets which are deemed to have an estimated useful life equal to or exceeding the estimated useful life of the facility, community as a whole, or exceeding the legal life of the community as defined in an association's governing documents. Examples include the complete replacement of the foundation, elevators, wiring and oftentimes plumbing. Also excluded are insignificant expenses which may be covered either by an operating or reserve contingency, or otherwise in a general maintenance fund. Costs which are caused by acts of God, accidents or other occurrences which are more properly insured for, rather than reserved for, are also excluded.
