= 2022 United States House of Representatives elections in Maryland =

- November 8, 2022

All 8 Maryland seats to the United States House of Representatives
| | Majority party | Minority party |
|---|---|---|
| Party | Democratic | Republican |
| Last election | 7 | 1 |
| Seats won | 7 | 1 |
| Seat change | Steady | Steady |
| Popular vote | 1,291,481 | 690,463 |
| Percentage | 64.71% | 34.60% |
| Swing | ▼0.04% | ▼0.20% |

Democratic
50–60%
60–70%
70–80%
80–90%
>90%
Republican
50–60%
60–70%
70–80%

The 2022 United States House of Representatives elections in Maryland were held on November 8, 2022, to elect the eight U.S. representatives from the state of Maryland, one from each of the state's eight congressional districts. The elections coincided with other elections to the House of Representatives, elections to the United States Senate, and various state and local elections. The Democratic and Republican primaries were held on July 19.

== District 1 ==
2022 Maryland's 1st congressional district election
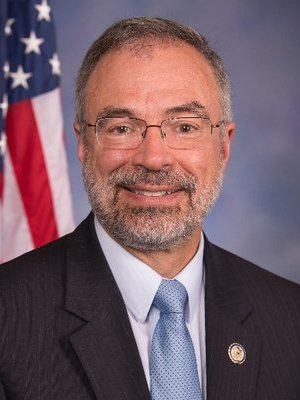

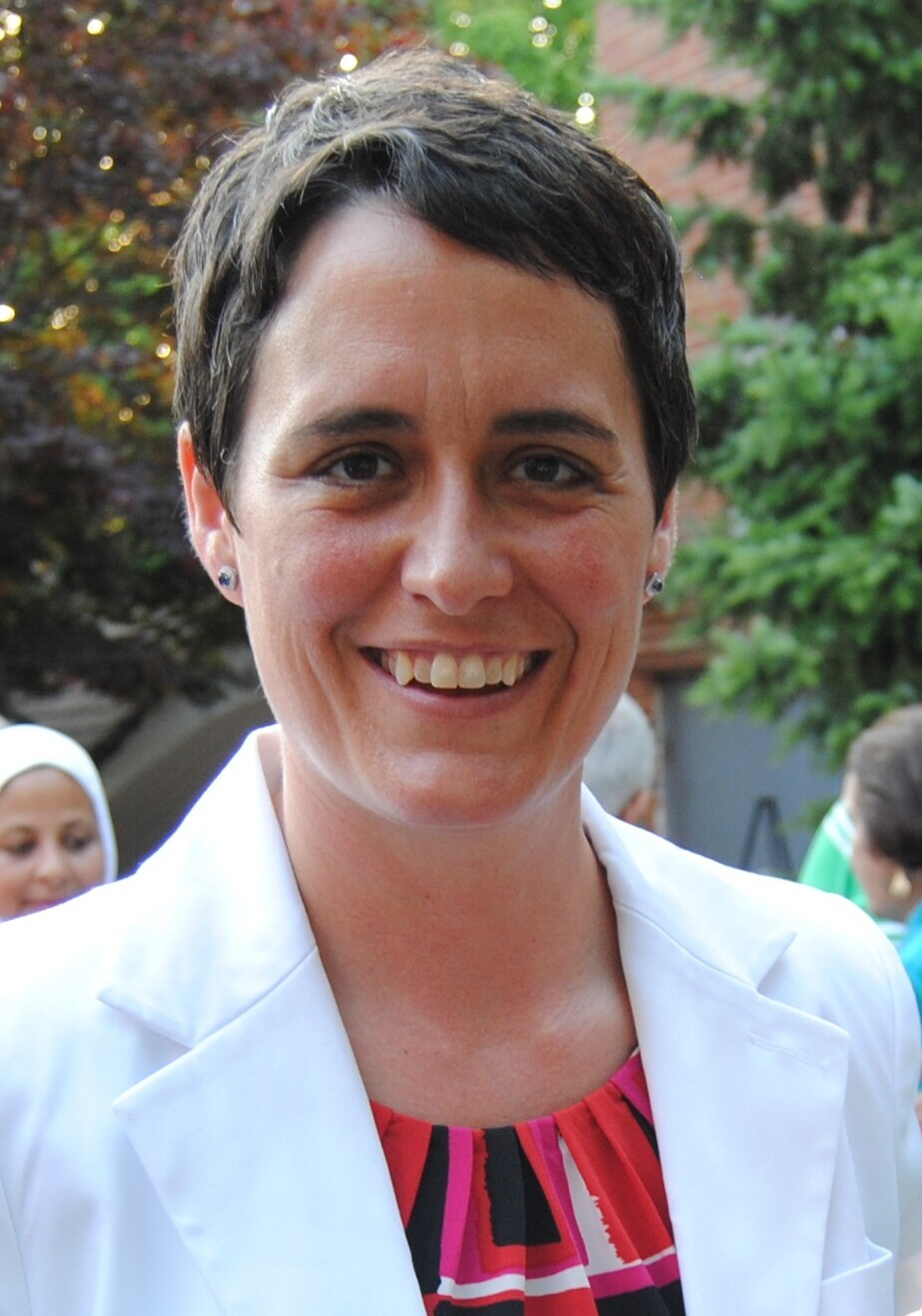
| Nominee | Andy Harris | Heather Mizeur |
| Party | Republican | Democratic |
| Popular vote | 159,673 | 126,511 |
| Percentage | 54.4% | 43.1% |
- Harris: 40–50% 50–60% 60–70% 70–80% 80–90% ≥90% Mizeur: 40–50% 50–60% 60–70% 70–80% 80–90% ≥90% Tie: 40–50%
U.S. Representative before election
Andy Harris
Republican
Elected U.S. Representative
Andy Harris
Republican

The 1st district encompasses the entire Eastern Shore of Maryland, including Salisbury, Harford County, and parts of north Baltimore County. The incumbent was Republican Andy Harris, who was reelected with 63.4% of the vote in 2020.

=== Republican primary ===
==== Candidates ====
===== Nominee =====
- Andy Harris, incumbent U.S. representative

===== Declined =====
- Barry Glassman, Harford County executive (2014–present) (ran for comptroller)

==== Endorsements ====
Andy Harris

Organizations

- American Israel Public Affairs Committee
- Maryland Realtors Political Action Committee
- Maryland Right to Life
- National Rifle Association - Political Victory Fund
- National Right to Life Committee
- Republican Jewish Coalition PAC
- Stand for Health Freedom

==== Results ====
Republican primary results
| Party | Candidate | Votes | % |
|---|---|---|---|
| Republican | Andy Harris (incumbent) | 67,933 | 100.0 |
| Total votes | | 67,933 | 100.0 |

=== Democratic primary ===
==== Candidates ====
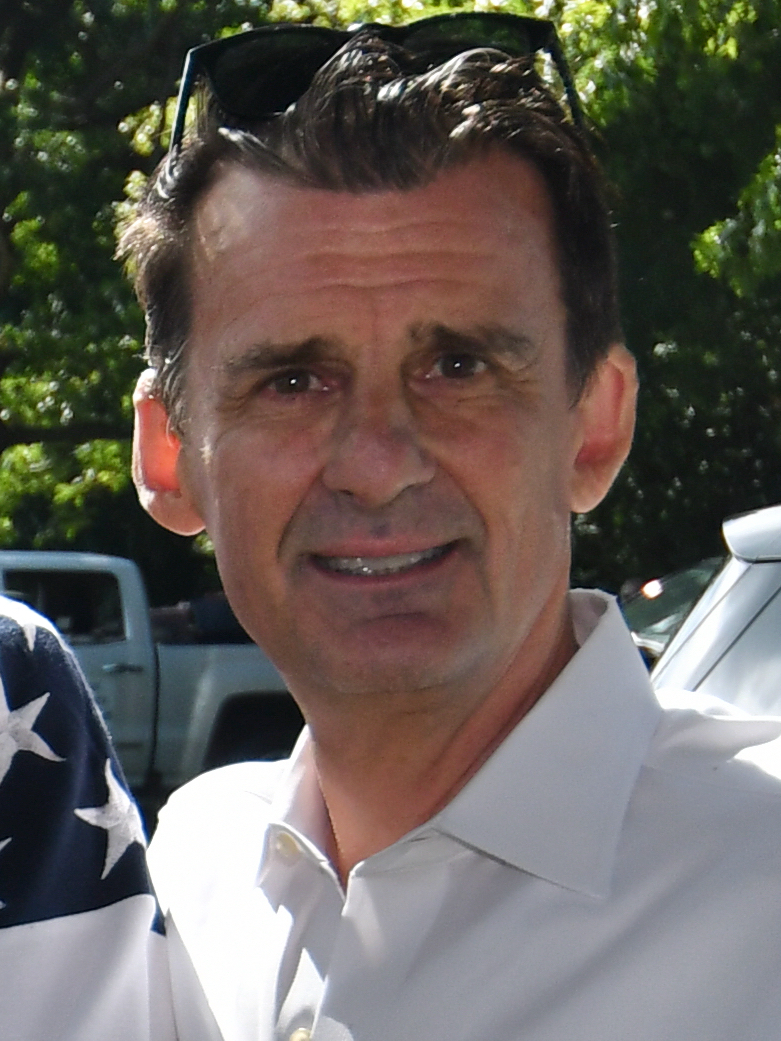
Former U.S. diplomat R. David Harden placed second in the primary.

===== Nominee =====
- Heather Mizeur, former state delegate for the 20th district (2007–2015) and candidate for governor in 2014

===== Eliminated in primary =====
- R. David Harden, International Trade consultant and former U.S. diplomat

===== Withdrawn =====
- Malcolm Thomas Colombo, structural engineer
- Mia Mason, Democratic nominee for Maryland's 1st congressional district in 2020 (endorsed Mizeur)

===== Endorsements =====
R. David Harden

Executive officials

- Maura Connelly, former United States Ambassador to the Republic of Lebanon (2010–2013)
- Gene A. Cretz, former United States Ambassador to Ghana (2012–2015) and Libya (2009–2012)
- Alonzo Fulgham, former Acting Administrator of the United States Agency for International Development (2009–2010)
- William J. Garvelink, former United States Ambassador to the Democratic Republic of the Congo (2007–2010)
- Gary A. Grappo, former United States Ambassador to Oman (2013–2016)
- Patricia M. Haslach, former Acting Assistant Secretary of State for Economic and Business Affairs (2016–2017) and United States Ambassador to Ethiopia (2013–2016)
- Theodore H. Kattouf, former United States Ambassador to Syria (2001–2003) and the United Arab Emirates (1999–2001)
- Robin Raphel, former United States Ambassador to Tunisia (1997–2000) and Assistant Secretary of State for South and Central Asian Affairs (1993–1997)
- Dana Shell Smith, former United States Ambassador to Qatar (2014–2017)
- Edward S. Walker Jr., former United States Ambassador to Israel (1997–1999), Egypt (1994–1997), and the United Arab Emirates (1989–1992)

Organizations

- Renew America Movement
- The Steady State
Heather Mizeur

Executive branch officials

- John King Jr., former United States Secretary of Education (2016–2017)
- Tom Perez, former United States Secretary of Labor (2013–2017)

U.S. Senators

- Chris Van Hollen, U.S. Senator from Maryland (2017–present)

U.S. Representatives

- Anthony Brown, MD-04 (2017–present)
- Wayne Gilchrest, MD-01 (1991–2009)
- Steny Hoyer, House Majority Leader (2007–2011, 2019–present) from MD-05 (1981–present)
- Kweisi Mfume, MD-07 (1987–1996, 2020–present)
- Jamie Raskin, MD-08 (2017–present)
- Dutch Ruppersberger, MD-02 (2003–present)
- John Sarbanes, MD-03 (2007–present)
- David Trone, MD-06 (2019–present)

State officials

- Doug Gansler, former attorney general of Maryland (2007–2015)
- Nancy Kopp, former Treasurer of Maryland (2002–2021)

State legislators

- Pamela Beidle, 32nd district (2019–present)
- Sarah K. Elfreth, 30th district (2019–present)
- James Rosapepe, 21st district (2019–present)
- 6 state delegates

Local officials

- Rushern Baker, former Prince George's County executive (2010–2018)
- Gavin Buckley, mayor of Annapolis (2017–present)
- Jacob R. Day, mayor of Salisbury (2015–present)
- Johnny Olszewski, Baltimore County executive (2018–present)

Individuals

- Wes Moore, author

Labor unions

- AFSCME Locals 3 and 67
- American Federation of Teachers Maryland
- Maryland and DC AFL–CIO
- SEIU Maryland and D.C. State Council and Local 500
- United Auto Workers
- 3 UFCW locals

Organizations

- EMILY's List
- End Citizens United
- Equality PAC
- IFPTE
- League of Conservation Voters Action Fund
- LGBTQ Victory Fund
- LPAC
- National Organization for Women PAC
- National Women's Political Caucus
- New Democrat Coalition Action Fund
- Sierra Club

==== Results ====
Democratic primary results
| Party | Candidate | Votes | % |
|---|---|---|---|
| Democratic | Heather Mizeur | 34,549 | 68.8 |
| Democratic | R. David Harden | 15,683 | 31.2 |
| Total votes | | 50,232 | 100.0 |

=== Libertarian primary ===
==== Candidates ====
===== Nominee =====
- Daniel Frank Thibeault

=== Green Party ===
==== Candidates ====
===== Withdrawn =====
- George Gluck, perennial candidate (ran in MD-06)

=== General election ===
==== Debate ====
2022 Maryland's 1st congressional district debate
| No. | Date | Host | Moderator | Link | Republican | Democratic | Libertarian |
| Key: P Participant A Absent N Not invited I Invited W Withdrawn | | | | | | | |
| Key: P Participant A Absent N Not invited I Invited W Withdrawn | | | | | Andy Harris | Heather Mizeur | Daniel Thibeault |
|---|---|---|---|---|---|---|---|
| 1 | Oct. 26, 2022 | Cecil Public Media | | | P | P | A |

==== Predictions ====
| Source | Ranking | As of |
|---|---|---|
| The Cook Political Report | Solid R | June 29, 2022 |
| Inside Elections | Solid R | June 15, 2022 |
| Sabato's Crystal Ball | Safe R | June 29, 2022 |
| Politico | Likely R | April 5, 2022 |
| RCP | Safe R | June 9, 2022 |
| Fox News | Solid R | July 11, 2022 |
| DDHQ | Solid R | July 20, 2022 |
| 538 | Solid R | June 30, 2022 |
| Economist | Solid R | September 7, 2022 |

==== Polling ====
| Poll source | Date(s) administered | Sample size (Note: Key: A – all adults RV – registered voters LV – likely voters V – unclear) | Margin of error | Andy Harris (R) | Heather Mizeur (D) | Other | Undecided |
|---|---|---|---|---|---|---|---|
| Washington College | October 28 – November 1, 2022 | 597 (LV) | ± 4.0% | 45% | 39% | 3% (Note: Thibeault with 3%) | 13% |
| Washington College | October 28 – November 1, 2022 | 686 (RV) | ± 4.0% | 44% | 36% | 2% (Note: Thibeault with 2%) | 18% |

==== Results ====
2022 Maryland's 1st congressional district election
| Party | Candidate | Votes | % |
|---|---|---|---|
| Republican | Andy Harris (incumbent) | 159,673 | 54.4 |
| Democratic | Heather Mizeur | 126,511 | 43.1 |
| Libertarian | Daniel Thibeault | 6,924 | 2.4 |
| Write-in | | 250 | 0.1 |
| Total votes | | 293,358 | 100.0 |
| Republican hold | | | |

==== Post-primary endorsements ====
Heather Mizeur (D)

State legislators

- Heather Bagnall, state delegate for the 33rd district (2019–present)
- Ben Barnes, state delegate for the 33rd district (2007–present)
- J. Sandy Bartlett, state delegate for the 32nd district (2019–present)
- Lisa Belcastro, state delegate for the 11th district (2020–present)
- Dana Jones, state delegate for district 30A (2020–present)
- Mary A. Lehman, state delegate for the 21st district (2019–present)
- Joseline Peña-Melnyk, state delegate for the 21st district (2007–present)

Individuals

- Melissa Etheridge, singer, songwriter, and musician

Labor unions

- International Brotherhood of Electrical Workers Local 26
- Professional Fire Fighters of Maryland

Organizations

- Lower Shore Progressive Caucus
- Planned Parenthood Action Fund
- Progressive Turnout Project
- Service Employees International Union Maryland and D.C. State Council

Newspapers

- The Baltimore Sun

== District 2 ==
2022 Maryland's 2nd congressional district election
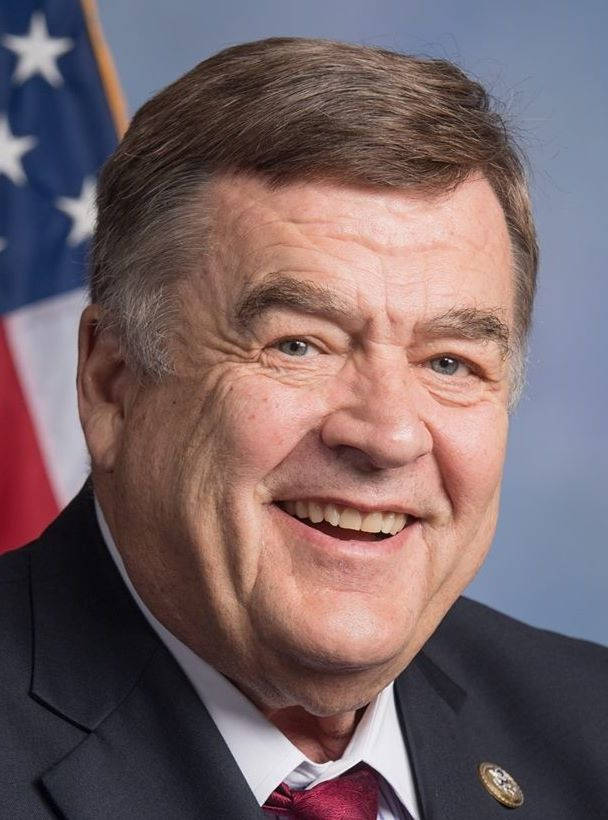

| Nominee | Dutch Ruppersberger | Nicolee Ambrose |
| Party | Democratic | Republican |
| Popular vote | 158,998 | 109,075 |
| Percentage | 59.23% | 40.63% |
- Ruppersberger: 50–60% 60–70% 70–80% 80–90% ≥90% Ambrose: 50–60% 60–70% 70–80% 80–90%
U.S. Representative before election
Dutch Ruppersberger
Democratic
Elected U.S. Representative
Dutch Ruppersberger
Democratic

The 2nd district encompasses much of Baltimore and Carroll counties, along with a portion of Baltimore itself. The incumbent was Democrat Dutch Ruppersberger, who was reelected with 67.7% of the vote in 2020.

=== Democratic primary ===
==== Candidates ====
===== Nominee =====
- Dutch Ruppersberger, incumbent U.S. representative

===== Eliminated in primary =====
- George Croom, former campaign manager
- Marques Dent
- Liri Fusha, nurse

==== Endorsements ====
Dutch Ruppersberger (incumbent)

Labor unions

- American Federation of State, County and Municipal Employees Local 67
- American Federation of Teachers Maryland
- Maryland State and District of Columbia AFL–CIO
- Service Employees International Union Local 500
- United Auto Workers
- United Food and Commercial Workers Local 27
- United Food and Commercial Workers Local 400
- United Food and Commercial Workers Local 1994 MCGEO

Organizations

- American Israel Public Affairs Committee
- Human Rights Campaign
- Humane Society of the United States Legislative Fund
- Maryland Realtors Political Action Committee
- National Committee to Preserve Social Security and Medicare
- Planned Parenthood Action Fund
- Pro-Israel America
- Progressive Turnout Project

==== Results ====
Democratic primary results
| Party | Candidate | Votes | % |
|---|---|---|---|
| Democratic | Dutch Ruppersberger (incumbent) | 62,896 | 75.4 |
| Democratic | George Croom | 8,465 | 10.2 |
| Democratic | Marques Dent | 7,728 | 9.3 |
| Democratic | Liri Fusha | 4,218 | 5.1 |
| Total votes | | 83,307 | 100.0 |

=== Republican primary ===
==== Candidates ====
===== Nominee =====
- Nicolee Ambrose, member of the Republican National Committee

===== Eliminated in primary =====
- Berney Flowers, veteran
- Michael A. Geppi, former Harford County councilmember (1998–2002), tech executive
- Lance Griffin, National Guard veteran
- Ellen "EJ" McNulty, public health policy professional
- David D. Wallace, business owner and nominee for Maryland's 8th congressional district in 2014

===== Withdrawn =====
- Yuripzy Morgan, former WBAL radio host (ran in MD-03)

===== Declined =====
- Barry Glassman, Harford County executive (2014–present) (ran for comptroller)
- David Marks, Baltimore County council member (2010–present) (ran for re-election)

===== Endorsements =====
Nicolee Ambrose

U.S. Representatives

- Ronny Jackson, U.S. Representative for Texas's 13th congressional district (2021–present)

Individuals

- David Bossie, Republican National Committeeman from Maryland (2016–present)

Organizations

- Citizens United Political Victory Fund
- FreedomWorks
- Maggie's List
Lance Griffin

Organizations

- Maryland Right to Life
Dave Wallace

Organizations

- Stand for Health Freedom

==== Results ====
Republican primary results
| Party | Candidate | Votes | % |
|---|---|---|---|
| Republican | Nicolee Ambrose | 12,201 | 32.3 |
| Republican | David D. Wallace | 7,643 | 20.2 |
| Republican | Michael A. Geppi | 5,595 | 14.8 |
| Republican | Berney Flowers | 4,983 | 13.2 |
| Republican | Ellen "EJ" McNulty | 4,204 | 11.1 |
| Republican | Lance Griffin | 3,192 | 8.4 |
| Total votes | | 37,818 | 100.0 |

=== General election ===
==== Predictions ====
| Source | Ranking | As of |
|---|---|---|
| The Cook Political Report | Solid D | June 29, 2022 |
| Inside Elections | Solid D | June 15, 2022 |
| Sabato's Crystal Ball | Safe D | June 29, 2022 |
| Politico | Solid D | April 5, 2022 |
| RCP | Likely D | June 9, 2022 |
| Fox News | Solid D | July 11, 2022 |
| DDHQ | Solid D | July 20, 2022 |
| 538 | Solid D | June 30, 2022 |
| Economist | Likely D | November 1, 2022 |

==== Polling ====
| Poll source | Date(s) administered | Sample size | Margin of error | Dutch Ruppersberger (D) | Nicolee Ambrose (R) | Other | Undecided |
|---|---|---|---|---|---|---|---|
| KAConsulting LLC (R) (Note: This poll was sponsored by the Maryland Republican Party) | October 18–19, 2022 | 300 (LV) | – | 43% | 34% | 5% | 18% |

==== Results ====
2022 Maryland's 2nd congressional district election
| Party | Candidate | Votes | % |
|---|---|---|---|
| Democratic | Dutch Ruppersberger (incumbent) | 158,998 | 59.2 |
| Republican | Nicolee Ambrose | 109,075 | 40.6 |
| Write-in | | 361 | 0.1 |
| Total votes | | 268,434 | 100.0 |
| Democratic hold | | | |

==== Post-primary endorsements ====
Dutch Ruppersberger (D)

Labor unions

- International Brotherhood of Electrical Workers Local 26
- Maryland Fraternal Order of Police

Organizations

- Sierra Club

Newspapers

- Baltimore Afro-American
Nicolee Ambrose (R)

State officials

- Larry Hogan, 62nd governor of Maryland (2015–present)
- Kristi Noem, 33rd governor of South Dakota (2019–present)

== District 3 ==
2022 Maryland's 3rd congressional district election
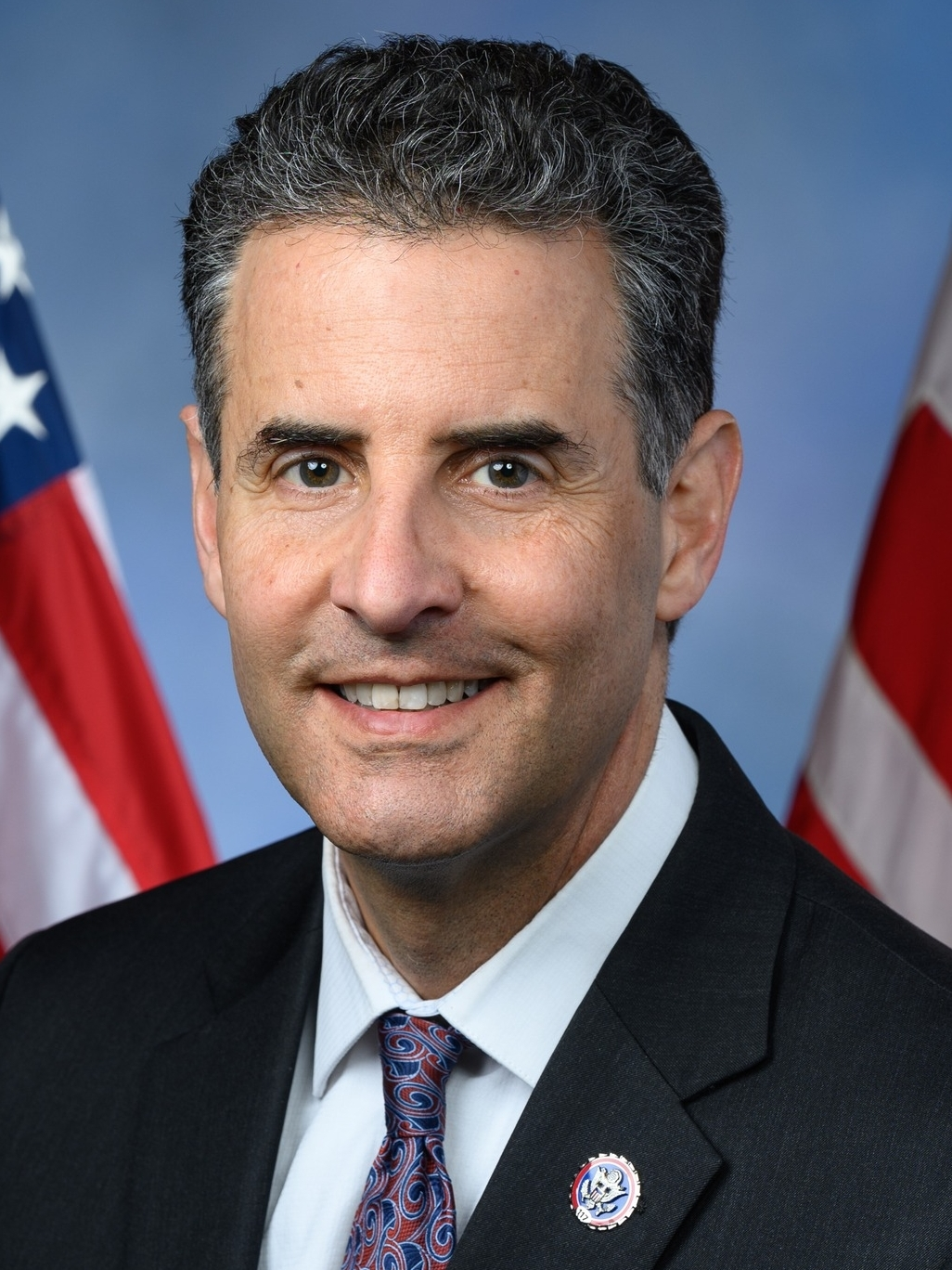

| Nominee | John Sarbanes | Yuripzy Morgan |
| Party | Democratic | Republican |
| Popular vote | 175,514 | 115,801 |
| Percentage | 60.19% | 39.71% |
- Sarbanes: 50–60% 60–70% 70–80% 80–90% ≥90% Morgan: 50–60% 60–70% 70–80% ≥90% Tie: 40–50%
U.S. Representative before election
John Sarbanes
Democratic
Elected U.S. Representative
John Sarbanes
Democratic

The 3rd district encompasses all of Howard County, much of Anne Arundel County, including Annapolis, and parts of Carroll County. The incumbent was Democrat John Sarbanes, who was reelected with 69.8% of the vote in 2020.

=== Democratic primary ===
==== Candidates ====
===== Nominee =====
- John Sarbanes, incumbent U.S. representative

===== Eliminated in primary =====
- Ben R. Beardsley
- Jake Pretot, army veteran, small business owner, and candidate for Maryland's second congressional district in 2020

==== Withdrawn ====
- Malcolm Thomas Colombo, structural engineer (ran in MD-01)
- Eselebor Okojie, pharmacist

==== Endorsements ====
John Sarbanes (incumbent)

Labor unions

- American Federation of State, County and Municipal Employees Local 67
- American Federation of Teachers Maryland
- Maryland State and District of Columbia AFL–CIO
- Service Employees International Union Local 500
- United Auto Workers
- United Food and Commercial Workers Local 27
- United Food and Commercial Workers Local 400
- United Food and Commercial Workers Local 1994 MCGEO

Organizations

- 21st Century Democrats
- Feminist Majority PAC
- Human Rights Campaign
- Humane Society of the United States Legislative Fund
- Maryland Realtors Political Action Committee
- Planned Parenthood Action Fund
- Progressive Turnout Project
- Sierra Club

==== Results ====
Democratic primary results
| Party | Candidate | Votes | % |
|---|---|---|---|
| Democratic | John Sarbanes (incumbent) | 63,790 | 84.6 |
| Democratic | Ben R. Beardsley | 6,854 | 9.1 |
| Democratic | Jake Pretot | 4,728 | 6.3 |
| Total votes | | 75,372 | 100.0 |

=== Republican primary ===
==== Candidates ====
===== Nominee =====
- Yuripzy Morgan, former WBAL radio host

===== Eliminated in primary =====
- Thomas E. "Pinkston" Harris, perennial candidate
- Joe Kelley, technician
- Antonio Pitocco, retail worker and activist
- Amal Torres, U.S. Air Force veteran and former military intelligence analyst

==== Endorsements ====
Yuripzy Morgan

Organizations

- Maggie's List
Antonio Pitocco

Organizations

- Maryland Right to Life
- Stand for Health Freedom

==== Results ====
Republican primary results
| Party | Candidate | Votes | % |
|---|---|---|---|
| Republican | Yuripzy Morgan | 13,198 | 33.6 |
| Republican | Joe Kelley | 8,924 | 22.7 |
| Republican | Antonio Pitocco | 8,041 | 20.5 |
| Republican | Thomas E. "Pinkston" Harris | 4,966 | 12.6 |
| Republican | Amal Torres | 4,171 | 10.6 |
| Total votes | | 39,300 | 100.0 |

=== General election ===
==== Predictions ====
| Source | Ranking | As of |
|---|---|---|
| The Cook Political Report | Solid D | June 29, 2022 |
| Inside Elections | Solid D | June 15, 2022 |
| Sabato's Crystal Ball | Safe D | June 29, 2022 |
| Politico | Solid D | April 5, 2022 |
| RCP | Safe D | June 9, 2022 |
| Fox News | Solid D | July 11, 2022 |
| DDHQ | Solid D | July 20, 2022 |
| 538 | Solid D | June 30, 2022 |
| Economist | Likely D | November 1, 2022 |

==== Results ====
2022 Maryland's 3rd congressional district election
| Party | Candidate | Votes | % |
|---|---|---|---|
| Democratic | John Sarbanes (incumbent) | 175,514 | 60.2 |
| Republican | Yuripzy Morgan | 115,801 | 39.7 |
| Write-in | | 287 | 0.1 |
| Total votes | | 291,602 | 100.0 |
| Democratic hold | | | |

==== Post-primary endorsements ====
John Sarbanes (D)

Labor unions

- International Brotherhood of Electrical Workers Local 26

Newspapers

- Baltimore Afro-American
Yuripzy Morgan (R)

State officials

- Larry Hogan, 62nd governor of Maryland (2015–present)

== District 4 ==
2022 Maryland's 4th congressional district election
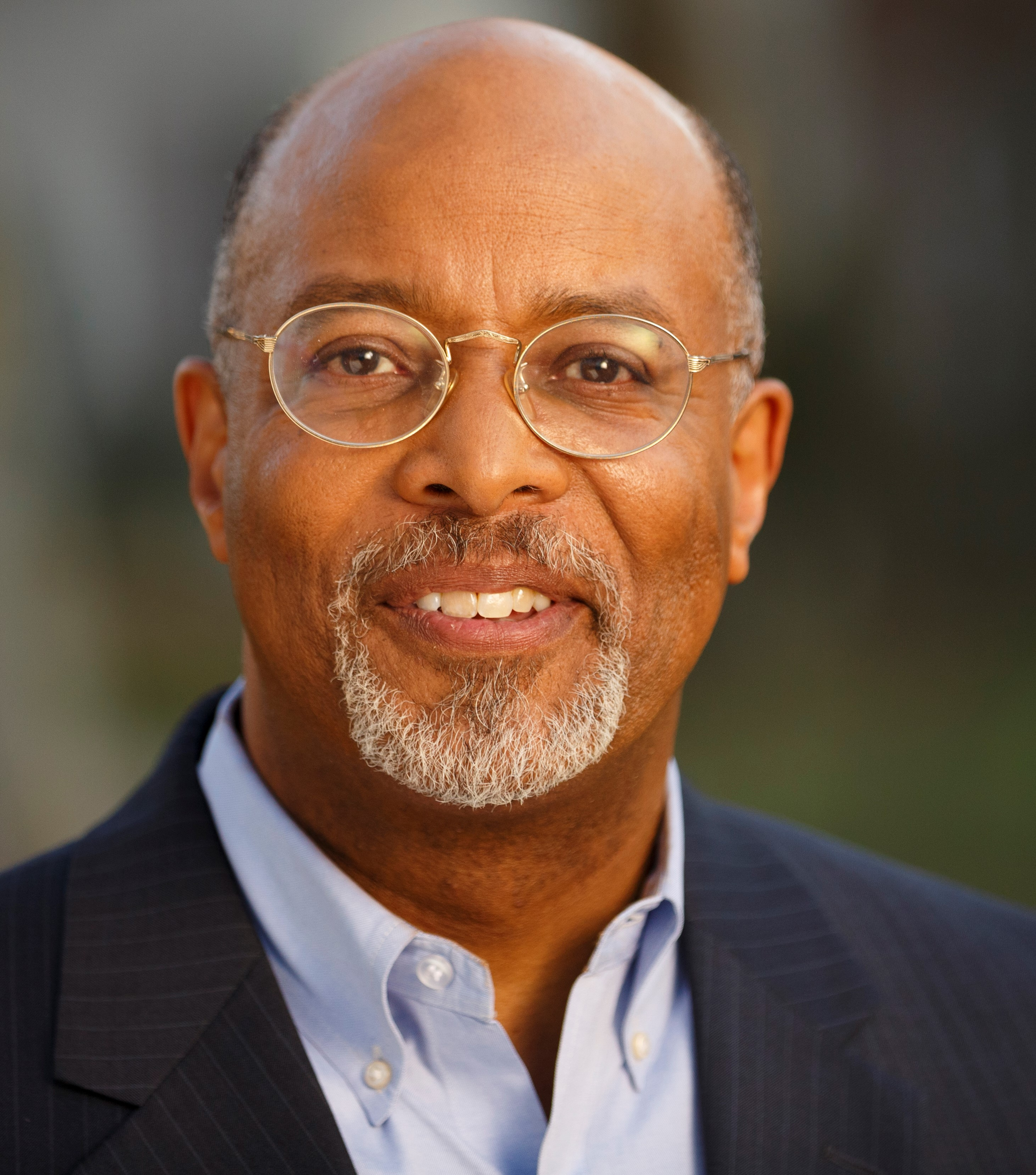

| Nominee | Glenn Ivey | Jeff Warner |
| Party | Democratic | Republican |
| Popular vote | 144,168 | 15,441 |
| Percentage | 90.10% | 9.65% |
- Ivey: 50–60% 60–70% 70–80% 80–90% ≥90% Tie: 40–50%
U.S. Representative before election
Anthony Brown
Democratic
Elected U.S. Representative
Glenn Ivey
Democratic

The 4th district encompasses parts of the Washington, D.C. suburbs in Prince George's County and Montgomery County, including Landover, Laurel, and Suitland. The incumbent was Democrat Anthony Brown, who was reelected with 79.6% of the vote in 2020.

=== Democratic primary ===
==== Candidates ====
===== Nominee =====
- Glenn Ivey, former Prince George's County State Attorney (2002–2011) and candidate for Maryland's 4th congressional district in 2016

===== Eliminated in primary =====
- Tammy Allison, attorney and candidate for Texas's 6th congressional district in 2021 special election
- Angela Angel, former state delegate for the 25th district (2015–2019)
- James Curtis Jr., accountant
- Donna Edwards, former U.S. Representative for Maryland's 4th congressional district (2008–2017) and candidate for U.S. Senate in 2016
- Matthew Fogg, retired Chief Deputy U.S. Marshal, anti-racism and anti-corruption activist, and candidate for Maryland's 4th congressional district in 2016
- Gregory Holmes, former Republican candidate for Maryland's 4th congressional district in 2012 and 2014 and for the U.S. Senate in 2016
- Robert K. McGhee
- Kim A. Shelton, bus operator

===== Withdrawn =====
- Jazz Lewis, state delegate for the 24th district (2017–present) (ran for re-election)

===== Declined =====
- Anthony Brown, incumbent U.S. representative (ran for attorney general)

==== Endorsements ====
Donna Edwards

Executive branch officials

- Hillary Clinton, former U.S. Secretary of State (2009–2013), former U.S. Senator from New York (2001–2009), former First Lady of the United States (1993–2001), and nominee for president of the United States in the 2016 presidential election

U.S. Senators

- Elizabeth Warren, U.S. Senator from Massachusetts (2013–present)

U.S. Representatives

- Suzanne Bonamici, U.S. Representative from Oregon's 1st congressional district (2012–present)
- David Cicilline, U.S. Representative from Rhode Island's 1st congressional district (2011–present)
- Diana DeGette, U.S. Representative from Colorado's 1st congressional district (1997–present)
- Anna Eshoo, U.S. Representative from California's 18th congressional district (1993–present)
- Pramila Jayapal, U.S. Representative from Washington's 7th congressional district (2017–present)
- Robin Kelly, U.S. Representative from Illinois's 2nd congressional district (2013–present)
- Betty McCollum, U.S. Representative from Minnesota's 4th congressional district (2013–present)
- Gwen Moore, U.S. Representative from Wisconsin's 4th congressional district (2013–present)
- Connie Morella, U.S. Representative from Maryland's 8th congressional district (1987–2003) (Republican)
- Nancy Pelosi, 52nd Speaker of the United States House of Representatives (2019–present) and U.S. Representative for California's 12th congressional district (1987–present)
- Chellie Pingree, U.S. Representative from Maine's 1st congressional district (2009–present)

Local officials

- Aisha Braveboy, Prince George's County State's Attorney (2019–present)

Individuals

- Jane Fonda, actress and activist

Labor unions

- 1199SEIU
- Amalgamated Transit Union Local 689
- American Federation of State, County and Municipal Employees Council 3
- American Federation of State, County and Municipal Employees Council 67
- American Federation of State, County and Municipal Employees Local 2250
- American Federation of Teachers Maryland
- Maryland State and District of Columbia AFL–CIO
- National Education Association
- Service Employees International Union Local 500
- UNITE HERE Local 25
- United Auto Workers
- United Food and Commercial Workers Local 400

Organizations

- Congressional Progressive Caucus PAC
- Democracy for America
- EMILY's List
- Environment America
- Feminist Majority PAC
- Friends of the Earth Action
- JStreetPAC
- League of Conservation Voters Action Fund
- National Committee to Preserve Social Security and Medicare
- National Nurses United
- National Organization for Women PAC
- National Women's Political Caucus
- Our Revolution Maryland
- Peace Action
- Progressive Change Campaign Committee
- Progressive Democrats of America
- Sierra Club
- Working Families Party
Glenn Ivey

U.S. Representatives

- Maxine Waters, Chair of the House Financial Services Committee (2019–present) and U.S. Representative for California's 43rd congressional district (1991–present)
- Albert Wynn, former U.S. Representative for Maryland's 4th congressional district (1993–2008)

State officials

- Parris Glendening, 59th governor of Maryland (1995–2003)

State legislators

- Julian Ivey, state delegate for district 47A (2019–present) (candidate's son)

Local officials

- Rushern Baker, former Prince George's County Executive (2010–2018) and candidate for governor in 2018 and 2022
- Edward Burroughs, Prince George's County councilmember-elect (2022–present)
- Tom Dernoga, Prince George's County councilmember (2002–2010, 2018–present)
- Jolene Ivey, Prince George's County councilmember (2018–present) (candidate's wife)
- Ike Leggett, former Montgomery County executive (2006–2018)
- Rodney Streeter, Prince George's County councilmember (2018–2022)

Labor unions

- International Federation of Professional and Technical Engineers

Organizations

- American Israel Public Affairs Committee
- Democratic Majority for Israel
- Maryland Realtors Political Action Committee
- New Democrat Coalition Action Fund
- Prince George's County Association of Realtors
- Pro-Israel America

Newspapers

- Baltimore Jewish Times (Democratic primary only)
- The Washington Post (Democratic primary only)
Jazz Lewis (withdrawn)

U.S. Representatives

- Steny Hoyer, U.S. Representative for Maryland's 5th congressional district (1981–present)
- Ritchie Torres, U.S. Representative for New York's 15th congressional district (2021–present)

State officials

- Kathleen Kennedy Townsend, former Lieutenant Governor of Maryland (1995–2003)

State legislators

- Ben Barnes, state delegate for the 21st district (2007–present)
- Darryl Barnes, state delegate for the 25th district (2015–present)
- J. Sandy Bartlett, state delegate for the 32nd district (2019–present)
- Pamela Beidle, state senator for the 32nd district (2019–present)
- Joanne C. Benson, state senator for the 24th district (2011–present)
- Alice J. Cain, former state delegate for district 30A (2019–2020)
- Ned Carey, state delegate for district 31A (2015–present)
- Mark Chang, state delegate for the 32nd district (2015–present)
- Faye Martin Howell, state delegate for the 24th district (2021–present)
- Rachel Jones, state delegate for district 27B (2021–present)
- Anne Kaiser, state delegate for the 14th district (2003–present)
- Marc Korman, state delegate for the 16th district (2015–present)
- Cheryl S. Landis, state delegate for district 23B (2021–present)
- Eric Luedtke, state delegate for the 14th district (2019–present)
- Cory V. McCray, state senator for the 45th district (2019–present)
- David Moon, state delegate for the 20th district (2015–present)
- Mike Rogers, state delegate for the 32nd district (2019–present)
- Carlo Sanchez, former state delegate for district 47B (2015–2019)
- Jared Solomon, state delegate for the 18th district (2019–present)
- Charles E. Sydnor III, state senator for the 44th district (2020–present)
- Geraldine Valentino-Smith, state delegate for district 23A (2011–present)
- Alonzo T. Washington, state delegate for the 22nd district (2012–present)
- Ron Watson, state senator for the 23rd district (2021–present)
- Jheanelle Wilkins, state delegate for the 20th district (2017–present)

Local officials

- Susan Turnbull, former chair of the Maryland Democratic Party (2009–2011), former vice chair of the Democratic National Committee (2005–2009), and nominee for lieutenant governor in 2018

=== Polling ===
| Poll source | Date(s) administered | Sample size | Margin of error | Angela Angel | Donna Edwards | Glenn Ivey | Jazz Lewis | Other | Undecided |
|---|---|---|---|---|---|---|---|---|---|
| Change Research (D) (Note: Poll was sponsored by the LCV Victory Fund, which supports Edwards) | June 2–8, 2022 | 586 (LV) | ± 4.5% | 4% | 28% | 33% | – | 1% (Note: Allison with 1%; Curtis, Fogg, Holmes, and Shelton with 0%) | 33% |
| Lake Research Partners (D) (Note: Poll was sponsored by Edwards's campaign) | April 28 – May 4, 2022 | 400 (LV) | ± 4.9% | 4% | 45% | 24% | – | 3% | 24% |
| | April 14, 2022 | Lewis withdraws from the race | | | | | | | |
| Public Policy Polling (D) (Note: Poll was sponsored by Ivey's campaign) | December 8–9, 2021 | 403 (LV) | ± 4.9% | 8% | – | 31% | 5% | – | 56% |
| Public Policy Polling (D) | December 8–9, 2021 | 403 (LV) | ± 4.9% | – | – | 35% | 7% | – | 58% |

==== Results ====
Democratic primary results
| Party | Candidate | Votes | % |
|---|---|---|---|
| Democratic | Glenn Ivey | 42,791 | 51.8 |
| Democratic | Donna Edwards | 29,114 | 35.2 |
| Democratic | Angela Angel | 4,678 | 5.7 |
| Democratic | Tammy Allison | 1,726 | 2.1 |
| Democratic | Kim A. Shelton | 1,354 | 1.6 |
| Democratic | Gregory Holmes | 1,024 | 1.2 |
| Democratic | James Curtis Jr. | 763 | 0.9 |
| Democratic | Matthew Fogg | 663 | 0.8 |
| Democratic | Robert K. McGhee | 549 | 0.7 |
| Total votes | | 82,662 | 100.0 |

=== Republican primary ===
==== Candidates ====
===== Nominee =====
- Jeff Warner, pastor

===== Eliminated in primary =====
- Eric Loeb, anti-gerrymandering activist and candidate for this district in 2020
- George McDermott, perennial candidate

==== Results ====
Republican primary results
| Party | Candidate | Votes | % |
|---|---|---|---|
| Republican | Jeff Warner | 2,414 | 58.7 |
| Republican | George McDermott | 1,091 | 26.5 |
| Republican | Eric Loeb | 607 | 14.8 |
| Total votes | | 4,112 | 100.0 |

=== General election ===
==== Predictions ====
| Source | Ranking | As of |
|---|---|---|
| The Cook Political Report | Solid D | June 29, 2022 |
| Inside Elections | Solid D | June 15, 2022 |
| Sabato's Crystal Ball | Safe D | June 29, 2022 |
| Politico | Solid D | April 5, 2022 |
| RCP | Safe D | June 9, 2022 |
| Fox News | Solid D | July 11, 2022 |
| DDHQ | Solid D | July 20, 2022 |
| 538 | Solid D | June 30, 2022 |
| Economist | Solid D | September 7, 2022 |

==== Results ====
2022 Maryland's 4th congressional district election
| Party | Candidate | Votes | % |
|---|---|---|---|
| Democratic | Glenn Ivey | 144,168 | 90.1 |
| Republican | Jeff Warner | 15,441 | 9.6 |
| Write-in | | 400 | 0.3 |
| Total votes | | 160,009 | 100.0 |
| Democratic hold | | | |

==== Post-primary endorsements ====
Glenn Ivey (D)

Labor unions

- International Brotherhood of Electrical Workers Local 26
- International Brotherhood of Teamsters
- Maryland State and District of Columbia AFL–CIO

Organizations

- Human Rights Campaign
- Humane Society of the United States Legislative Fund
- International Franchise Association
- Jewish Democratic Council of America
- Sierra Club

Newspapers

- Baltimore Afro-American
- The Washington Post

== District 5 ==
2022 Maryland's 5th congressional district election
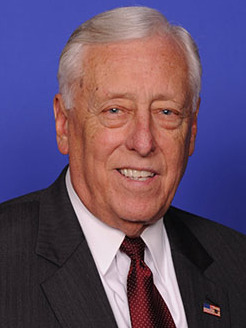

| Nominee | Steny Hoyer | Chris Palombi |
| Party | Democratic | Republican |
| Popular vote | 182,478 | 94,000 |
| Percentage | 65.90% | 33.94% |
- Hoyer: 50–60% 60–70% 70–80% 80–90% ≥90% Palombi: 40–50% 50–60% 60–70% 70–80% ≥90% Tie: 40–50% No votes
U.S. Representative before election
Steny Hoyer
Democratic
Elected U.S. Representative
Steny Hoyer
Democratic

The 5th district is based in southern Maryland, encompassing all of Charles, St. Mary's, and Calvert counties and parts of Prince George's and Anne Arundel counties and containing the Washington, D.C. suburbs of Bowie, Waldorf, and Upper Marlboro. The incumbent was Democrat Steny Hoyer, the current House Majority Leader, who was reelected with 68.8% of the vote in 2020.

=== Democratic primary ===
==== Candidates ====
===== Nominee =====
- Steny Hoyer, incumbent U.S. Representative and House Majority Leader

===== Eliminated in primary =====
- Keith Washington, former police officer and felon
- Mckayla Wilkes, administrative assistant and candidate for this district in 2020

===== Withdrawn =====
- Colin Byrd, former mayor of Greenbelt (endorsed Wilkes)
- Elaine Sarah Belson, clinical social worker

==== Endorsements ====
Steny Hoyer (incumbent)

State legislators

- Malcolm Augustine, state senator for the 47th district (2019–present)
- Ben Barnes, state delegate for the 21st district (2007–present)
- Darryl Barnes, state delegate for the 25th district (2007–present)
- Joanne C. Benson, state senator for the 24th district (2011–present)
- Nick Charles, state delegate for the 25th district (2019–present)
- Brian M. Crosby, state delegate for district 29B (2019–present)
- Dereck E. Davis, state delegate for the 25th district (1995–present)
- Melony Griffith, state senator for the 25th district (2020–present)
- Andrea Harrison, state delegate for the 24th district (2019–present)
- Anne Healey, state delegate for the 22nd district (2019–present)
- Marvin E. Holmes Jr., state delegate for district 23B (2003–present)
- Faye Martin Howell, state delegate for the 24th district (2021–present)
- Michael A. Jackson, state senator for the 27th district (2021–present)
- Rachel Jones, state delegate for district 27B (2021–present)
- Cheryl S. Landis, state delegate for the district 23B (2021–present)
- Mary A. Lehman, state delegate for the 21st district (2019–present)
- Jazz Lewis, state delegate for the 24th district (2017–present)
- Edith J. Patterson, state delegate for the 28th district (2015–present)
- Obie Patterson, state senator for the 26th district (2019–present)
- Joseline Peña-Melnyk, state delegate for the 21st district (2020–present)
- Paul G. Pinsky, state senator for the 21st district (2007–present)
- Susie Proctor, state delegate for district 27A (2015–present)
- Jim Rosapepe, state senator for the 21st district (2007–present)
- Kriselda Valderrama, state delegate for the 26th district (2007–present)
- Geraldine Valentino-Smith, state delegate for district 23A (2011–present)
- Jay Walker, state delegate for the 26th district (2007–present)
- Ron Watson, state senator for the 23rd district (2021–present)
- Nicole A. Williams, state delegate for the 22nd district (2019–present)
- C. T. Wilson, state delegate for the 28th district (2011–present)

Local officials

- Angela Alsobrooks, Prince George's County executive (2018–present)
- Aisha Braveboy, Prince George's County State's Attorney (2019–present)

Labor unions

- American Federation of State, County and Municipal Employees Local 67
- American Federation of Teachers Maryland
- Maryland State and District of Columbia AFL–CIO
- Service Employees International Union Local 500
- UNITE HERE Local 25
- United Auto Workers
- United Food and Commercial Workers Local 27
- United Food and Commercial Workers Local 400
- United Food and Commercial Workers Local 1994 MCGEO

Organizations

- American Israel Public Affairs Committee
- Democratic Majority for Israel PAC
- End Citizens United
- Feminist Majority PAC
- Giffords
- Human Rights Campaign
- Humane Society of the United States Legislative Fund
- Maryland Realtors Political Action Committee
- National Committee to Preserve Social Security and Medicare
- Planned Parenthood Action Fund
- Pro-Israel America
Mckayla Wilkes

Individuals

- Marianne Williamson, political activist and columnist for Newsweek, candidate for California's 33rd congressional district in 2014, candidate for the Democratic nomination for President of the United States in 2020

Organizations

- Democracy for America
- Friends of the Earth Action
- Our Revolution Maryland
- RootsAction.org

==== Results ====
Democratic primary results
| Party | Candidate | Votes | % |
|---|---|---|---|
| Democratic | Steny Hoyer (incumbent) | 68,729 | 71.3 |
| Democratic | Mckayla Wilkes | 18,403 | 19.1 |
| Democratic | Keith Washington | 9,222 | 9.6 |
| Total votes | | 96,354 | 100.0 |

=== Republican primary ===
==== Candidates ====
===== Nominee =====
- Chris Palombi, former police officer and nominee for this district in 2020

===== Eliminated in primary =====
- Bryan DuVal Cubero, veteran and candidate for this district in 2020
- Vanessa Marie Hoffman, businesswoman and Democratic candidate for this district in 2020
- Toni Jarboe-Duley, realtor
- Michael S. Lemon
- Patrick Lucky Stevens
- Tannis Villanova, U.S. Marine Corps veteran

==== Endorsements ====
Chris Palombi

Organizations

- Maryland Right to Life
- Stand for Health Freedom

==== Results ====
Republican primary results
| Party | Candidate | Votes | % |
|---|---|---|---|
| Republican | Chris Palombi | 24,423 | 67.5 |
| Republican | Vanessa Marie Hoffman | 3,538 | 9.8 |
| Republican | Tannis Villanova | 2,445 | 6.8 |
| Republican | Michael S. Lemon | 1,818 | 5.0 |
| Republican | Toni Jarboe-Duley | 1,578 | 4.4 |
| Republican | Patrick Stevens | 1,344 | 3.7 |
| Republican | Bryan DuVal Cubero | 1,024 | 2.8 |
| Total votes | | 36,170 | 100.0 |

=== General election ===
==== Predictions ====
| Source | Ranking | As of |
|---|---|---|
| The Cook Political Report | Solid D | June 29, 2022 |
| Inside Elections | Solid D | June 15, 2022 |
| Sabato's Crystal Ball | Safe D | June 29, 2022 |
| Politico | Solid D | April 5, 2022 |
| RCP | Safe D | June 9, 2022 |
| Fox News | Solid D | July 11, 2022 |
| DDHQ | Solid D | July 20, 2022 |
| 538 | Solid D | June 30, 2022 |
| Economist | Solid D | September 7, 2022 |

==== Results ====
2022 Maryland's 5th congressional district election
| Party | Candidate | Votes | % |
|---|---|---|---|
| Democratic | Steny Hoyer (incumbent) | 182,478 | 65.9 |
| Republican | Chris Palombi | 94,000 | 33.9 |
| Write-in | | 442 | 0.2 |
| Total votes | | 276,920 | 100.0 |
| Democratic hold | | | |

==== Post-primary endorsements ====
Steny Hoyer (D)

Labor unions

- International Brotherhood of Electrical Workers Local 26

Organizations

- Brady PAC
- Everytown for Gun Safety
- Sierra Club

== District 6 ==
2022 Maryland's 6th congressional district election
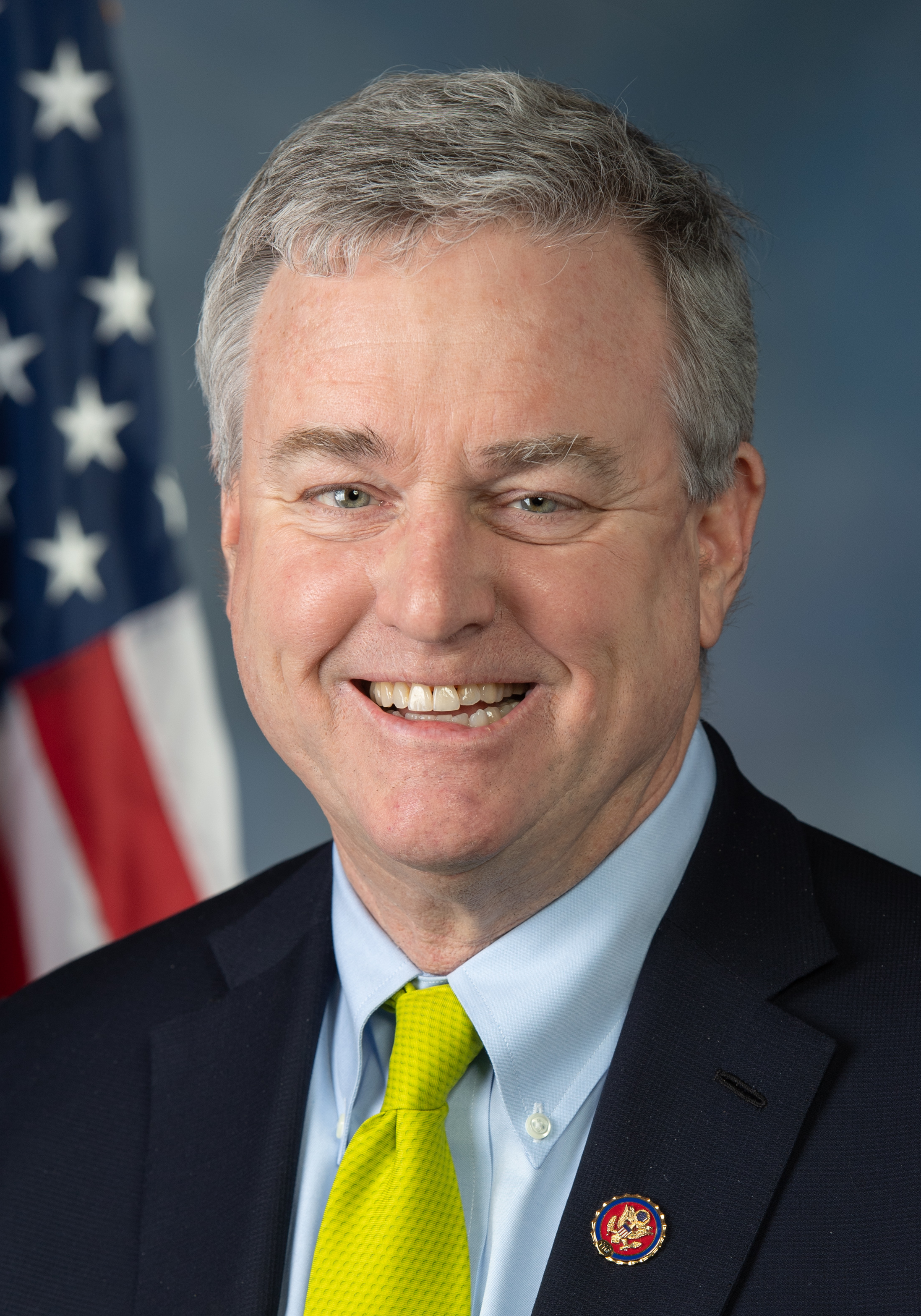

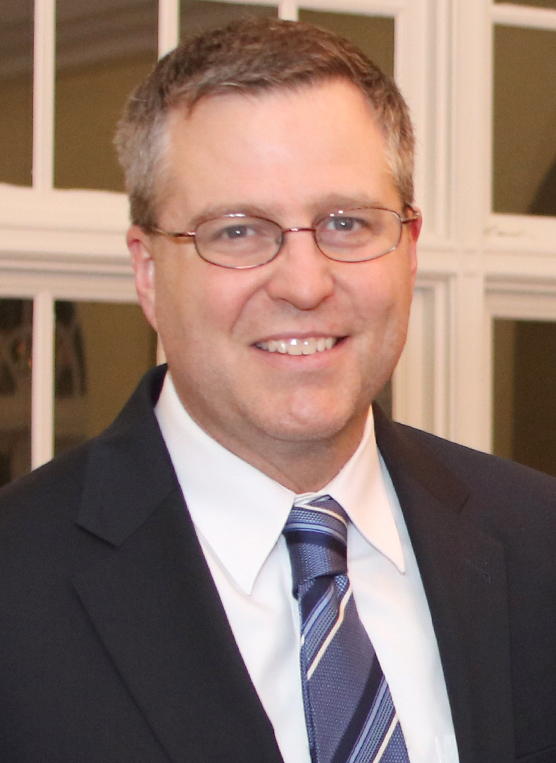
| Nominee | David Trone | Neil Parrott |
| Party | Democratic | Republican |
| Popular vote | 140,295 | 115,771 |
| Percentage | 54.72% | 45.15% |
- Trone: 50–60% 60–70% 70–80% 80–90% Parrott: 50–60% 60–70% 70–80% 80–90% ≥90% Tie: 40–50%
U.S. Representative before election
David Trone
Democratic
Elected U.S. Representative
David Trone
Democratic

The 6th district is based in western Maryland. It covers all of Garrett, Allegany, Washington, and Frederick counties, and extends south into the Washington, D.C. suburbs in Montgomery County, including Germantown and Gaithersburg. The incumbent was Democrat David Trone, who was reelected with 58.8% of the vote in 2020. After redistricting in 2022, the district became much more competitive, giving up a portion of the heavily Democratic Montgomery County in exchange for a part of more competitive Frederick County.

This district was included on the list of Democratic-held seats that the National Republican Congressional Committee targeted in 2022.

=== Democratic primary ===
==== Candidates ====
===== Nominee =====
- David Trone, incumbent U.S. representative

===== Eliminated in primary =====
- George Gluck, perennial candidate
- Ben Smilowitz, founder and executive director of Disaster Accountability Project

===== Withdrawn =====
- Carleah Summers, executive director of transitional living houses (ran for Maryland Senate)

===== Declined =====
- Aruna Miller, former state delegate for the 15th district (2010–2019) and candidate for Maryland's 6th congressional district in 2018 (ran for lieutenant governor)

===== Endorsements =====
David Trone (incumbent)

State legislators

- Kumar Barve, state delegate for the 17th district (1991–present)
- Kathleen Dumais, former state delegate for the 15th district (2003–2021)
- Brian J. Feldman, state senator for the 15th district (2013–present)
- David Fraser-Hidalgo, state delegate for the 15th district (2013–present)
- Cheryl Kagan, state senator for the 17th district (2015–present)
- Ken Kerr, state delegate for district 3B (2019–present)
- Nancy J. King, Majority Leader of the Maryland Senate (2020–present) and state senator for the 39th district (2007–present)
- Carol Krimm, state delegate for district 3A (2015–present)
- Susan C. Lee, state senator for the 16th district (2015–present)
- Julie Palakovich Carr, state delegate for the 17th district (2019–present)
- Lily Qi, state delegate for the 15th district (2019–present)
- Kirill Reznik, state delegate for the 39th district (2007–present)
- Karen Lewis Young, state delegate for district 3A (2015–present)
- Ron Young, state senator the 3rd district (2011–present)

Local officials

- Gabe Albornoz, Montgomery County councilmember (2018–present)
- Andrew Friedson, Montgomery County councilmember (2018–present)
- Evan Glass, Montgomery County councilmember (2018–present)
- Tom Hucker, Montgomery County council president (2014–present) and former state delegate for the 20th district (2007–2014)
- Will Jawando, Montgomery County councilmember (2018–present)
- Sidney A. Katz, Montgomery County councilmember (2014–present)
- Isiah Leggett, former Montgomery County executive (2006–2018)
- Nancy Navarro, Montgomery County councilmember (2009–present)
- Craig L. Rice, Montgomery County councilmember (2010–present)

Labor unions

- American Federation of State, County and Municipal Employees Local 67
- American Federation of Teachers Maryland
- Maryland State and District of Columbia AFL–CIO
- National Education Association
- Service Employees International Union Local 500
- UNITE HERE Local 25
- United Auto Workers
- United Food and Commercial Workers Local 27
- United Food and Commercial Workers Local 400
- United Food and Commercial Workers Local 1994 MCGEO

Organizations

- American Israel Public Affairs Committee
- Democratic Majority for Israel PAC
- Human Rights Campaign
- Humane Society of the United States Legislative Fund
- League of Conservation Voters Action Fund
- Maryland Realtors Political Action Committee
- Planned Parenthood Action Fund
- Progressive Turnout Project
- Sierra Club

Newspapers

- The Washington Post (Democratic primary only)

==== Results ====
Democratic primary results
| Party | Candidate | Votes | % |
|---|---|---|---|
| Democratic | David Trone (incumbent) | 44,370 | 79.0 |
| Democratic | Ben Smilowitz | 8,995 | 16.0 |
| Democratic | George Gluck | 2,789 | 5.0 |
| Total votes | | 56,154 | 100.0 |

=== Republican primary ===
==== Candidates ====
===== Nominee =====
- Neil Parrott, state delegate for district 2A (2011–present) and nominee for Maryland's sixth congressional district in 2020

===== Eliminated in primary =====
- Colt M. Black, funeral director
- Matthew Foldi, writer and son of diplomat Bonnie Glick
- Jonathan Jenkins, software engineer
- Robert Poissonnier
- Mariela Roca, medical logistics specialist and USAF veteran

===== Withdrawn =====
- David D. Wallace, business owner and nominee for Maryland's 8th congressional district in 2014 (ran in MD-02)

===== Declined =====
- Jason C. Buckel, Minority Leader of the Maryland House of Delegates (2021–present) and state delegate for district 1B (2015–present) (ran for re-election)

===== Endorsements =====
Matthew Foldi

Executive branch officials

- David M. Friedman, former United States Ambassador to Israel (2017–2021)
- Richard Grenell, former United States Ambassador to Germany (2018–2020)
- Robert C. O'Brien, 27th United States National Security Advisor (2019–2021)
- Mike Pompeo, 70th United States Secretary of State (2018–2021)

U.S. Representatives

- Don Bacon, U.S. Representative for Nebraska's 2nd congressional district (2017–present)
- Jim Banks, Chair of the Republican Study Committee (2021–present) and U.S. Representative for Indiana's 3rd congressional district (2017–present)
- Darrell Issa, U.S. Representative for California's 50th congressional district (2021–present) and California's 49th congressional district (2003–2019)
- Kevin McCarthy, House Minority Leader (2019–present) and U.S. Representative for California's 23rd congressional district (2013–present) and California's 22nd congressional district (2007–2013)
- Carol Miller, U.S. Representative for West Virginia's 3rd congressional district (2019–present)
- Mariannette Miller-Meeks, U.S. Representative for Iowa's 2nd congressional district (2021–present)
- Elise Stefanik, chair of the House Republican Conference (2021–present), U.S. Representative from New York's 21st congressional district (2015–present)
- Claudia Tenney, U.S. Representative for New York's 22nd congressional district (2021–present)
- Michael Waltz, U.S. Representative for Florida's 6th congressional district (2019–present)

State officials

- Larry Hogan, 62nd governor of Maryland (2015–present)

Individuals

- Donald Trump Jr., businessman and son of former President Donald Trump

Organizations

- Montgomery County Republican Club
Neil Parrott

U.S. Representatives

- Andy Harris, U.S. Representative for Maryland's 1st congressional district (2011–present)

Organizations

- Conservative Political Action Conference
- Family Research Council PAC
- FreedomWorks
- Maryland Right to Life
- National Rifle Association - Political Victory Fund
- Stand for Health Freedom
- Western Maryland Sportsmen's Coalition

Newspapers

- The Washington Post (Republican primary only)

==== Results ====
Republican primary results
| Party | Candidate | Votes | % |
|---|---|---|---|
| Republican | Neil Parrott | 31,665 | 62.6 |
| Republican | Matthew Foldi | 7,497 | 14.8 |
| Republican | Mariela Roca | 3,858 | 7.6 |
| Republican | Colt M. Black | 3,789 | 7.5 |
| Republican | Jonathan Jenkins | 3,406 | 6.7 |
| Republican | Robert Poissonnier | 400 | 0.8 |
| Total votes | | 50,615 | 100.0 |

=== General election ===
==== Predictions ====
| Source | Ranking | As of |
|---|---|---|
| The Cook Political Report | Likely D | September 1, 2022 |
| Inside Elections | Likely D | June 15, 2022 |
| Sabato's Crystal Ball | Lean D | June 29, 2022 |
| Politico | Likely D | October 3, 2022 |
| RCP | Tossup | October 7, 2022 |
| Fox News | Lean D | July 11, 2022 |
| DDHQ | Likely D | August 31, 2022 |
| 538 | Lean D | October 22, 2022 |
| Economist | Tossup | November 1, 2022 |

==== Post-primary endorsements ====
David Trone (D)

Executive branch officials

- Joe Biden, 46th president of the United States (2021–present), 47th vice president of the United States (2009–2017), and former U.S. Senator from Delaware (1973–2009)

Labor unions

- International Brotherhood of Electrical Workers Local 26

Organizations

- Brady PAC
- Jewish Democratic Council of America
- NARAL Pro-Choice America

Newspapers

- The Washington Post
Neil Parrott (R)

Executive branch officials

- Steve Bannon, former Counselor to the President (2017)

U.S. Senator

- Ted Cruz, U.S. Senator from Texas (2013–present) and candidate for president in the 2016 presidential election

Organizations

- House Freedom Fund
- Huck PAC
- Tea Party Express

==== Polling ====
| Poll source | Date(s) administered | Sample size | Margin of error | David Trone (D) | Neil Parrott (R) | Other | Undecided |
|---|---|---|---|---|---|---|---|
| KAConsulting LLC (R) | October 18–19, 2022 | 300 (LV) | – | 42% | 37% | 6% | 15% |
| RMG Research | August 3–9, 2022 | 400 (LV) | ± 4.9% | 43% | 45% | 3% | 9% |

Hypothetical polling

David Trone vs. Jason Buckel

| Poll source | Date(s) administered | Sample size | Margin of error | David Trone (D) | Jason Buckel (R) | Undecided |
|---|---|---|---|---|---|---|
| McLaughlin & Associates (R) (Note: This poll was sponsored by an unnamed Maryland-based Republican group) | April 7–10, 2022 | 300 (LV) | ± 5.7% | 45% | 40% | – |

Generic Democrat vs. generic Republican

| Poll source | Date(s) administered | Sample size | Margin of error | Generic Democrat | Generic Republican | Undecided |
|---|---|---|---|---|---|---|
| McLaughlin & Associates (R) | April 7–10, 2022 | 300 (LV) | ± 5.7% | 44% | 45% | 11% |

==== Results ====
2022 Maryland's 6th congressional district election
| Party | Candidate | Votes | % |
|---|---|---|---|
| Democratic | David Trone (incumbent) | 140,295 | 54.7 |
| Republican | Neil Parrott | 115,771 | 45.2 |
| Write-in | | 332 | 0.1 |
| Total votes | | 256,398 | 100.0 |
| Democratic hold | | | |

== District 7 ==
2022 Maryland's 7th congressional district election
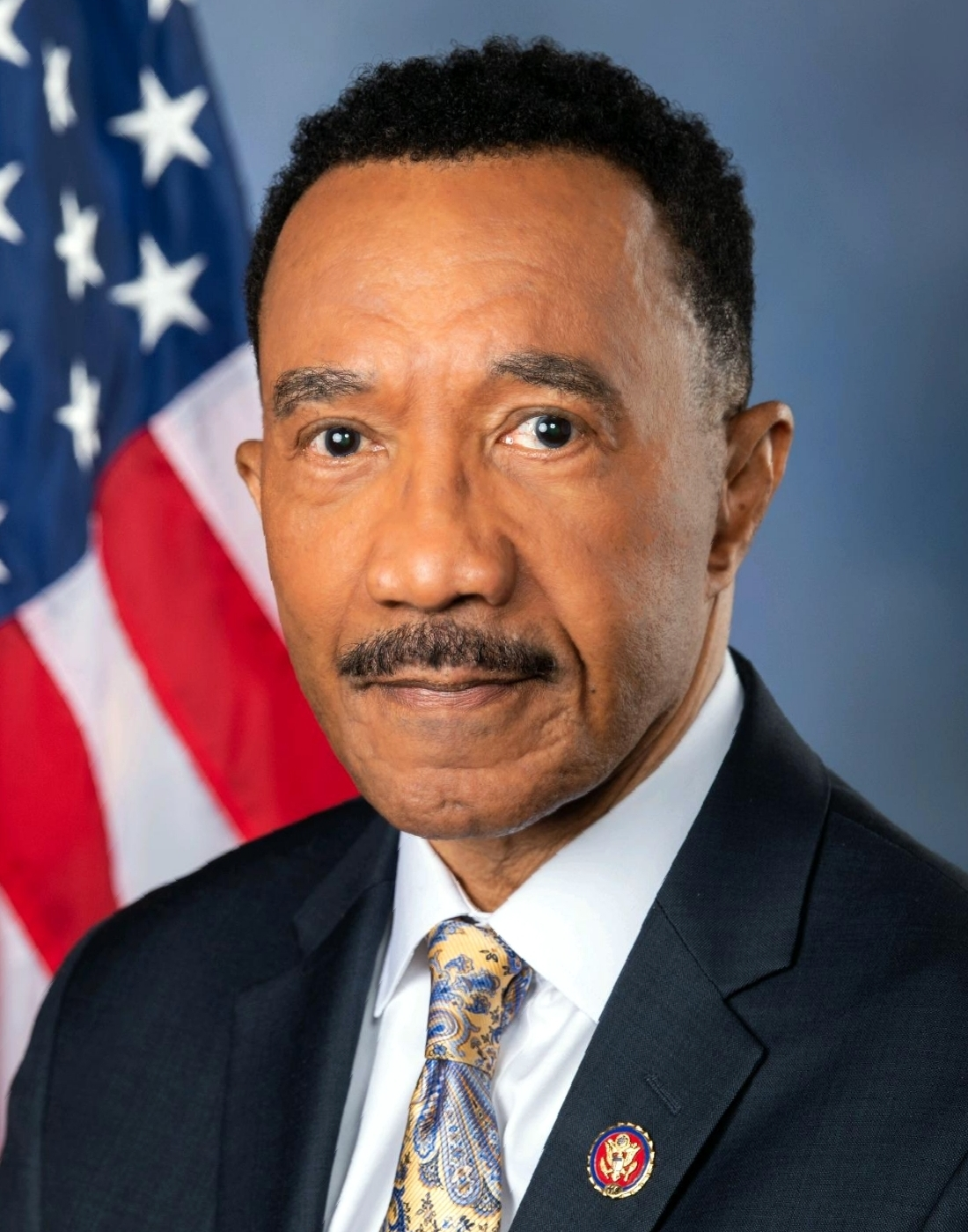

| Nominee | Kweisi Mfume | Scott Collier |
| Party | Democratic | Republican |
| Popular vote | 151,640 | 32,737 |
| Percentage | 82.06% | 17.71% |
- Mfume: 50–60% 60–70% 70–80% 80–90% >90% Collier: 50–60% 60–70% 70–80%
U.S. Representative before election
Kweisi Mfume
Democratic
Elected U.S. Representative
Kweisi Mfume
Democratic

The 7th district includes most of Baltimore and some of its suburbs. The incumbent was Democrat Kweisi Mfume, who was reelected with 71.6% of the vote in 2020.

=== Democratic primary ===
==== Candidates ====
===== Nominee =====
- Kweisi Mfume, incumbent U.S. representative

===== Eliminated in primary =====
- Tashi Kimandus Davis, navy veteran
- Elihu Eli El
- Wayne McNeal

==== Endorsements ====
Kweisi Mfume (incumbent)

Labor unions

- American Federation of State, County and Municipal Employees Local 67
- American Federation of Teachers Maryland
- Human Rights Campaign
- Maryland State and District of Columbia AFL–CIO
- Service Employees International Union Local 500
- United Auto Workers
- United Food and Commercial Workers Local 27
- United Food and Commercial Workers Local 400
- United Food and Commercial Workers Local 1994 MCGEO

Organizations

- American Israel Public Affairs Committee
- Congressional Black Caucus
- Maryland Realtors Political Action Committee
- National Committee to Preserve Social Security and Medicare
- Planned Parenthood Action Fund
- Progressive Turnout Project

Newspapers

- Baltimore Afro-American

==== Results ====
Democratic primary results
| Party | Candidate | Votes | % |
|---|---|---|---|
| Democratic | Kweisi Mfume (incumbent) | 80,118 | 85.2 |
| Democratic | Tashi Kimandus Davis | 7,141 | 7.6 |
| Democratic | Wayne McNeal | 4,890 | 5.2 |
| Democratic | Elihu Eli El | 1,885 | 2.0 |
| Total votes | | 94,034 | 100.0 |

=== Republican primary ===
==== Candidates ====
===== Nominee =====
- Scott M. Collier, perennial candidate

===== Eliminated in primary =====
- Ray Bly, candidate for Maryland's 7th congressional district in 2016, 2018, and 2020, candidate for Maryland's 2nd congressional district in 2012
- Michael Pearson, candidate for Maryland's 7th congressional district in 2018
- Lorrie Sigley, nurse

==== Results ====
Republican primary results
| Party | Candidate | Votes | % |
|---|---|---|---|
| Republican | Scott M. Collier | 2,873 | 34.6 |
| Republican | Lorrie Sigley | 2,245 | 27.1 |
| Republican | Michael Pearson | 1,906 | 23.0 |
| Republican | Ray Bly | 1,271 | 15.3 |
| Total votes | | 8,295 | 100.0 |

=== General election ===
==== Predictions ====
| Source | Ranking | As of |
|---|---|---|
| The Cook Political Report | Solid D | June 29, 2022 |
| Inside Elections | Solid D | June 15, 2022 |
| Sabato's Crystal Ball | Safe D | June 29, 2022 |
| Politico | Solid D | April 5, 2022 |
| RCP | Safe D | June 9, 2022 |
| Fox News | Solid D | July 11, 2022 |
| DDHQ | Solid D | July 20, 2022 |
| 538 | Solid D | June 30, 2022 |
| Economist | Solid D | September 7, 2022 |

==== Results ====
2022 Maryland's 7th congressional district election
| Party | Candidate | Votes | % |
|---|---|---|---|
| Democratic | Kweisi Mfume (incumbent) | 151,640 | 82.1 |
| Republican | Scott Collier | 32,737 | 17.7 |
| Write-in | | 424 | 0.2 |
| Total votes | | 184,801 | 100.0 |
| Democratic hold | | | |

==== Post-primary endorsements ====
Kweisi Mfume (D)

Labor unions

- International Brotherhood of Electrical Workers Local 26

Organizations

- Sierra Club

== District 8 ==
2022 Maryland's 8th congressional district election
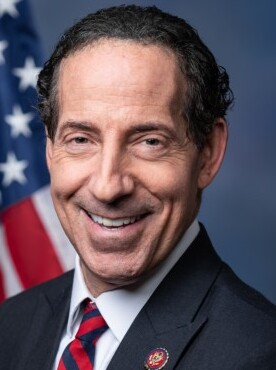

| Nominee | Jamie Raskin | Gregory Coll |
| Party | Democratic | Republican |
| Popular vote | 211,842 | 47,965 |
| Percentage | 80.18% | 18.15% |
- Raskin: 50–60% 60–70% 70–80% 80–90% ≥90%
U.S. Representative before election
Jamie Raskin
Democratic
Elected U.S. Representative
Jamie Raskin
Democratic

The 8th district encompasses the inner suburbs of Washington, D.C., and is located entirely within Montgomery County. The incumbent was Democrat Jamie Raskin, who was reelected with 68.2% of the vote in 2020.

=== Democratic primary ===
==== Candidates ====
===== Nominee =====
- Jamie Raskin, incumbent U.S. representative

===== Eliminated in primary =====
- Andalib Odulate, progressive activist

==== Endorsements ====
Jamie Raskin (incumbent)

Labor unions

- American Federation of State, County and Municipal Employees Local 67
- American Federation of Teachers Maryland
- Maryland State and District of Columbia AFL–CIO
- National Education Association
- Service Employees International Union Local 500
- UNITE HERE Local 25
- United Auto Workers
- United Farm Workers
- United Food and Commercial Workers Local 27
- United Food and Commercial Workers Local 400
- United Food and Commercial Workers Local 1994 MCGEO

Organizations

- Feminist Majority PAC
- Friends of the Earth Action
- Human Rights Campaign
- Humane Society of the United States Legislative Fund
- JStreetPAC
- League of Conservation Voters Action Fund
- Maryland Realtors Political Action Committee
- National Committee to Preserve Social Security and Medicare
- National Nurses United
- National Organization for Women PAC
- Peace Action
- Planned Parenthood Action Fund
- Progressive Change Campaign Committee
- Progressive Democrats of America
- Progressive Turnout Project
- Sierra Club

==== Results ====
Democratic primary results
| Party | Candidate | Votes | % |
|---|---|---|---|
| Democratic | Jamie Raskin (incumbent) | 109,055 | 93.9 |
| Democratic | Andalib Odulate | 7,075 | 6.1 |
| Total votes | | 116,130 | 100.0 |

=== Republican primary ===
==== Candidates ====
===== Nominee =====
- Gregory Coll, nominee for Maryland's 8th congressional district in 2020

===== Eliminated in primary =====
- Michael Mihirate Yadeta, engineer

==== Endorsements ====
Gregory Coll

Organizations

- Maryland Right to Life
- Stand for Health Freedom

==== Results ====
Republican primary results
| Party | Candidate | Votes | % |
|---|---|---|---|
| Republican | Gregory Thomas Coll | 11,445 | 83.6 |
| Republican | Michael Mihirate Yadeta | 2,245 | 16.4 |
| Total votes | | 13,690 | 100.0 |

=== Libertarian primary ===
==== Candidates ====
===== Nominee =====
- Andrés Garcia, software consultant

=== General election ===
==== Predictions ====
| Source | Ranking | As of |
|---|---|---|
| The Cook Political Report | Solid D | June 29, 2022 |
| Inside Elections | Solid D | June 15, 2022 |
| Sabato's Crystal Ball | Safe D | June 29, 2022 |
| Politico | Solid D | April 5, 2022 |
| RCP | Safe D | June 9, 2022 |
| Fox News | Solid D | July 11, 2022 |
| DDHQ | Solid D | July 20, 2022 |
| 538 | Solid D | June 30, 2022 |
| Economist | Solid D | September 7, 2022 |

==== Results ====
2022 Maryland's 8th congressional district election
| Party | Candidate | Votes | % |
|---|---|---|---|
| Democratic | Jamie Raskin (incumbent) | 211,842 | 80.2 |
| Republican | Gregory Coll | 47,965 | 18.1 |
| Libertarian | Andrés Garcia | 4,125 | 1.6 |
| Write-in | | 274 | 0.1 |
| Total votes | | 264,206 | 100.0 |
| Democratic hold | | | |

==== Post-primary endorsements ====
Jamie Raskin (D)

Labor unions

- International Brotherhood of Electrical Workers Local 26

Organizations

- Brady PAC
- Everytown for Gun Safety

Newspapers

- Baltimore Afro-American
- The Washington Post

== Notes ==
Partisan clients

== See also ==
- 2022 United States Senate election in Maryland
- 2022 Maryland gubernatorial election
- 2022 Maryland Attorney General election
- 2022 Maryland Comptroller election
