= Keenon James =

American politician (born 1980/1981)

- James in 2026

Member-elect of the Maryland House of Delegates from the 23rd district
- Delegate-elect
- Assuming office January 13, 2027
- Succeeding: Adrian Boafo

Personal details
- Born: 1980 or 1981 (age 45–46) Fort Washington, Maryland, U.S.
- Party: Democratic
- Education: North Carolina Central University (BS)
- Occupation: Gun violence prevention advocate

Keenon M. James (born 1980 or 1981) is an American politician who is a member-elect of the Maryland House of Delegates from the 23rd district. He is a member of the Democratic Party.

== Early life and education ==
James was born in Fort Washington, Maryland, in 1980 or 1981. On July 15, 1993, when James was 12 years old, his older brother Sean was murdered in Takoma Park, Maryland. James graduated from Bishop McNamara High School in 1999, afterwards attending North Carolina Central University, where he earned a Bachelor of Science degree in criminal justice in 2003.

== Career ==
James served as the deputy director of the North Carolina Sheriffs' Association from 2009 to 2014, afterwards working as an officer of The Pew Charitable Trusts's Public Safety Performance Project until 2016. From 2016 to 2019, he worked in the U.S. Department of Justice's Office of Community Oriented Policing Services, where he managed the Obama administration's Policing Practices and Accountability Initiative. Afterwards, James was the deputy director of the National Organization of Black Law Enforcement Executives until April 2021, when he was named as the senior director of Everytown for Gun Safety's Everytown Survivor Network. In November 2022, the Prince George's County Council appointed James to the county's Police Accountability Board. In June 2023, Elizabeth City State University named James to its board of visitors.

== Maryland House of Delegates ==
In 2022, James ran for the Maryland House of Delegates in District 23. He lost the Democratic primary election on July 19, 2022, placing sixth with 9.5 percent of the vote. He again ran for the Maryland House of Delegates in District 23 in 2026, winning the Democratic primary alongside incumbents Marvin E. Holmes Jr. and Kym Taylor on June 23, 2026, and defeating Republican nominees Michael Riker and Kimberly Robinson in the general election. He was assigned to the Judiciary Committee.

== Personal life ==
James lives in Upper Marlboro, Maryland. In 2022, he was the president of the Washington, D.C. chapter of Black Men Run.

== Electoral history ==
2022 Maryland House of Delegates District 23 Democratic primary election
Party	Candidate	Votes	%
Democratic	Marvin E. Holmes Jr. (incumbent)	10,382	16.20%
Democratic	Adrian Boafo	9,237	14.41%
Democratic	Kym Taylor	8,957	13.97%
Democratic	Jocelyn Irene Collins	8,938	13.94%
Democratic	Monica Roebuck	7,609	11.87%
Democratic	Keenon James	6,104	9.52%
Democratic	Remi Duyile	3,888	6.07%
Democratic	Januari McKay	3,784	5.90%
Democratic	Valeria Tomlin	2,630	4.10%
Democratic	Jacqui Steele-McCall	2,575	4.02%
Total votes		64,104	100.00%
