= Maryland House of Delegates District 23A =

American legislative district

Maryland's legislative district 23A
- Represents part of Prince George's County
- Registration: 69.5% Democratic; 11.8% Republican; 16.1% unaffiliated
- Demographics: 21.9% White; 55.8% Black/African American; 0.6% Native American; 5.4% Asian; 0.0% Hawaiian/Pacific Islander; 8.4% Other race; 7.9% Two or more races; 14.0% Hispanic
- Population (2020): 42,560
- Voting-age population: 32,556
- Registered voters: 29,093

Maryland House of Delegates District 23A was a former district of the Maryland House of Delegates. Along with subdistrict 23B, it made up the 23rd district of the Maryland Senate. District 23A included part of Prince George's County, and was represented by one delegate. During the 2020 United States redistricting cycle, the district was absorbed into the 23rd district.

== Demographic characteristics ==
As of the 2020 United States census, the district had a population of 42,560, of whom 32,556 (76.5%) were of voting age. The racial makeup of the district was 9,325 (21.9%) White, 23,744 (55.8%) African American, 262 (0.6%) Native American, 2,283 (5.4%) Asian, 8 (0.0%) Pacific Islander, 3,560 (8.4%) from some other race, and 3,375 (7.9%) from two or more races. Hispanic or Latino of any race were 5,951 (14.0%) of the population.

The district had 29,093 registered voters as of October 17, 2020, of whom 4,697 (16.1%) were registered as unaffiliated, 3,443 (11.8%) were registered as Republicans, 20,207 (69.5%) were registered as Democrats, and 626 (2.2%) were registered to other parties.

== Past Election Results ==
=== 2002 ===
Name	Party	Votes	Percent	Outcome
Mary A. Conroy	Democratic	15,979	37.5%	Won
James W. Hubbard	Democratic	14,094	33.1%	Won
Kenneth E. Rupert	Republican	6,342	14.9%	Lost
Day Gardner	Republican	6,156	14.4%	Lost
Other Write-Ins		48	0.1%	

=== 2006 ===
Name	Party	Votes	Percent	Outcome
James W. Hubbard	Democratic	17,765	47.6%	Won
Gerron Levi	Democratic	15,959	42.8%	Won
Steve Krukar	Constitution	3,479	9.3%	Lost
Other Write-Ins		116	0.3%	

=== 2010 ===
Name	Party	Votes	Percent	Outcome
Geraldine Valentino-Smith	Democratic	19,238	43.5%	Won
James W. Hubbard	Democratic	18,999	43.0%	Won
Margaret I. Moodie	Republican	5,913	13.4%	Lost
Other Write-Ins		81	0.2%	

=== 2014 ===
Name	Party	Votes	Percent	Outcome
Geraldine Valentino-Smith	Democratic	7,666	72.5%	Won
Shukoor Ahmed	Unaffiliated	2,869	27.1%	Lost
Other Write-Ins		45	0.4%	

=== 2018 ===
Name	Party	Votes	Percent	Outcome
Geraldine Valentino-Smith	Democratic	12,002	74.9%	Won
Kathleen Kositzky Crank	Republican	2,336	14.6%	Lost
Shabnam Ahmed	Democratic	1,642	10.2%	Lost
Other Write-Ins		44	0.3%	
