= Cheryl S. Landis =

American politician (born 1954)

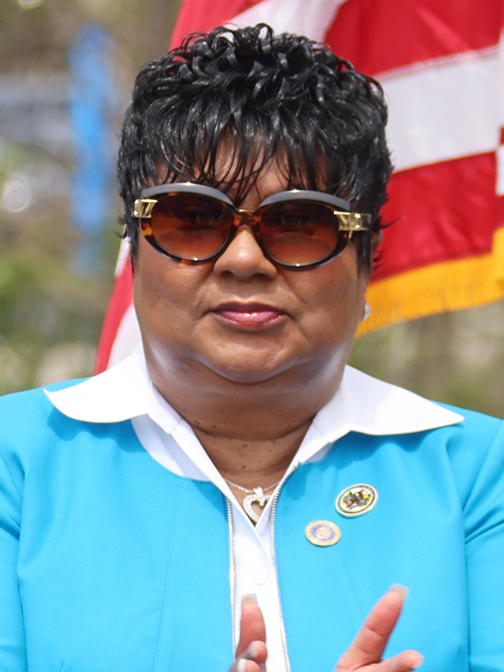
- Landis in 2022

Member of the Maryland House of Delegates from the 23B district
- In office October 8, 2021 – January 11, 2023
- Preceded by: Ron Watson
- Succeeded by: Kym Taylor

Personal details
- Born: October 11, 1954 (age 71)
- Party: Democratic
- Children: 1

Cheryl Summers Landis (born October 11, 1954) is a Democratic politician from Maryland. She was a member of the Maryland House of Delegates, representing district 23B, based in Prince George's County.

== Career ==
Landis worked for nearly three decades as a member of the Prince George's County Board of Education from 1989 to 2016, serving as an executive administrative officer and strategic business partnerships specialist. She was also the education coordinator to former Prince George's County executive Rushern Baker. In November 2016, Landis was defeated in the general election for the Prince George's County Public Schools board of education by Raaheela Ahmed.

Before getting appointed to the Maryland House of Delegates, Landis served as the chair of the Prince George's County Democratic Central Committee from 2014 to 2021. She also served as a Democratic National Committeewoman for Maryland and on the Maryland Democratic Party's executive, credentials and rules committees.

== In the legislature ==
Landis has been a member of the Maryland House of Delegates since October 8, 2021. She initially said that she would give "strong consideration" to seeking a four-year term in 2022, but ultimately decided not to run for re-election.

=== Committee assignments ===
- Health and Government Operations Committee, 2021–2023

=== Other memberships ===
- Legislative Black Caucus of Maryland, 2021–2023
- Women Legislators of Maryland, 2021–2023
