= Maryland House of Delegates District 23B =

American legislative district

Maryland's legislative district 23B
- Represents part of Prince George's County
- Delegate(s): Ron Watson (D); Marvin E. Holmes Jr. (D)
- Registration: 75.9% Democratic; 9.3% Republican; 13.0% unaffiliated
- Demographics: 17.7% White; 69.0% Black/African American; 0.4% Native American; 3.0% Asian; 0.0% Hawaiian/Pacific Islander; 3.5% Other race; 6.4% Two or more races; 6.7% Hispanic
- Population (2020): 93,196
- Voting-age population: 73,820
- Registered voters: 71,337

Maryland House of Delegates District 23B was a former district of the Maryland House of Delegates. Along with subdistrict 23A, it made up the 23rd district of the Maryland Senate. District 23B included parts of Prince George's County, and was represented by two delegates. During the 2020 United States redistricting cycle, the district was absorbed into the 23rd district.

== Demographic characteristics ==
As of the 2020 United States census, the district had a population of 93,196, of whom 73,820 (79.2%) were of voting age. The racial makeup of the district was 16,502 (17.7%) White, 64,293 (69.0%) African American, 341 (0.4%) Native American, 2,752 (3.0%) Asian, 11 (0.0%) Pacific Islander, 3,260 (3.5%) from some other race, and 5,999 (6.4%) from two or more races. Hispanic or Latino of any race were 6,208 (6.7%) of the population.

The district had 71,337 registered voters as of October 17, 2020, of whom 9,271 (13.0%) were registered as unaffiliated, 6,650 (9.3%) were registered as Republicans, 54,138 (75.9%) were registered as Democrats, and 1,060 (1.5%) were registered to other parties.

== Past election results ==
=== 2002 ===
Name	Party	Votes	Percent	Outcome
Marvin E. Holmes Jr.	Democratic	10,674	99.3%	Won
write-ins		78	0.7%	

=== 2006 ===
Name	Party	Votes	Percent	Outcome
Marvin E. Holmes Jr.	Democratic	11,951	99.4%	Won
write-ins		77	0.6%	

=== 2010 ===
Name	Party	Votes	Percent	Outcome
Marvin E. Holmes Jr.	Democratic	15,376	99.6%	Won
write-ins		65	0.4%	

=== 2014 ===
Name	Party	Votes	Percent	Outcome
Marvin E. Holmes Jr.	Democratic	22,518	47.5%	Won
Joseph F. Vallario Jr.	Democratic	19,274	40.6%	Won
Mike Hethmon	Republican	5,494	11.6%	Lost
write-ins		142	0.3%	

=== 2018 ===
Name	Party	Votes	Percent	Outcome
Ron Watson	Democratic	30,579	50.5%	Won
Marvin E. Holmes Jr.	Democratic	29,235	48.3%	Won
write-ins		685	1.1%	
