= Kym Taylor =

American politician (born 1964)

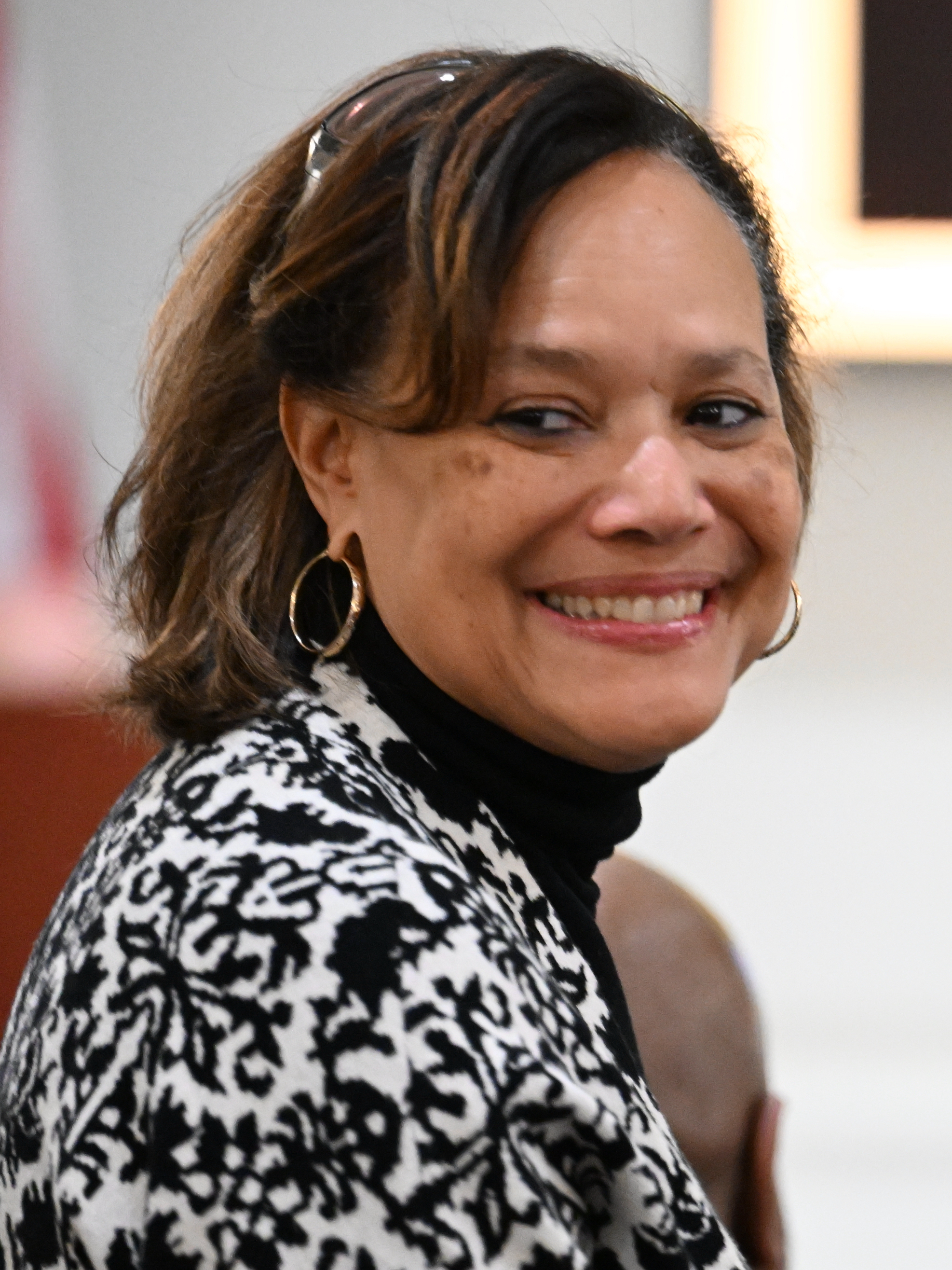
- Taylor in 2024

Member of the Maryland House of Delegates from the 23rd district
- Incumbent
- Assumed office January 11, 2023 Serving with Adrian Boafo and Marvin E. Holmes Jr.
- Preceded by: Cheryl S. Landis

Personal details
- Born: March 7, 1964 (age 62) Washington, D.C., U.S.
- Party: Democratic
- Children: 2
- Education: George Washington University (BBA); Atlanta University (MBA)
- Profession: Business owner
- Website: Campaign website

Kym Taylor (born March 7, 1964) is an American politician. She is a member of the Maryland House of Delegates for District 23 in Prince George's County.

== Early life and education ==
Taylor was born in Washington, D.C., on March 7, 1964. She graduated from the Duke Ellington School of the Arts in 1982. She later attended George Washington University, earning a Bachelor of Business Administration degree in information processing in 1986, and Atlanta University, where she received a Master of Business Administration degree in information systems and finance in 1988. Taylor runs her own health care company, where she works as a marketing executive.

== Career ==
Taylor worked as an aide to state Senator Paul G. Pinsky.

In August 2021, Taylor filed to fill the vacancy left by the appointment of state Delegate Ron Watson to the Maryland Senate. The Prince George's County Democratic Central Committee voted on September 14 to nominate its chair, Cheryl S. Landis, to serve the rest of Watson's term; Taylor received one vote.

=== Maryland House of Delegates ===
In 2022, Taylor ran for the Maryland House of Delegates in District 23. She ran on a ticket alongside Watson, state Delegate Marvin E. Holmes Jr., and Jocelyn Collins. She won the Democratic primary on July 19, coming in third with 14.0 percent of the vote and edging out her opponent, Jocelyn Collins, by 16 votes.

Taylor was sworn into the Maryland House of Delegates on January 11, 2023. She is a member of the House Judiciary Committee.

== Personal life ==
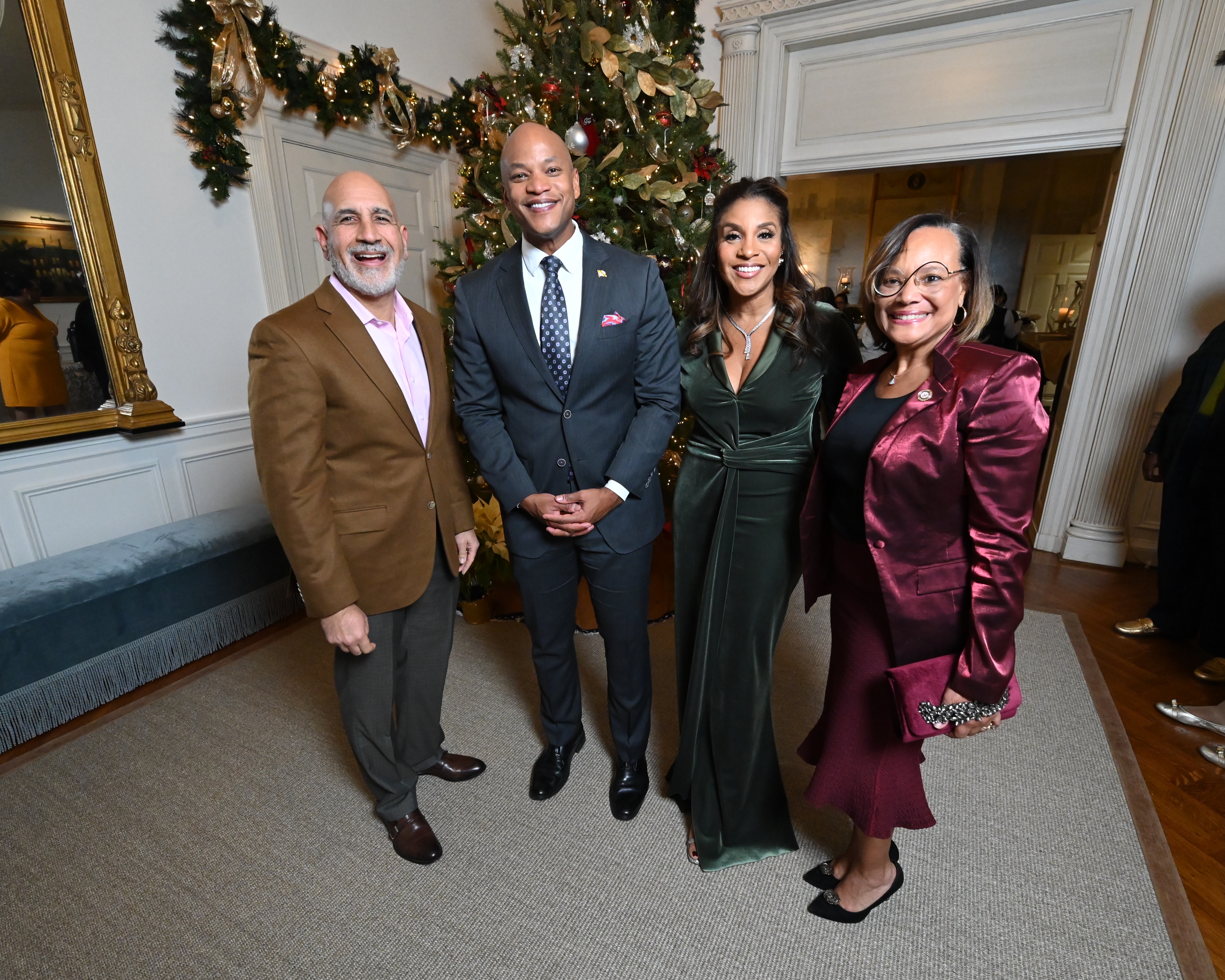
Taylor and her husband Steve with Governor Wes Moore and First Lady Dawn Moore, 2024

Taylor is married to her husband, Steve. In 2015, the Taylors purchased a $1.45 million home in Bowie, Maryland.

In June 2026, Capital News Service reported that Taylor and her husband settled tax liens totaling $705,999 over the last 10 years and still owed money to the state. Taylor told Capital News Service that the liens were a result of her and her husband's business loses, particularly during the COVID-19 pandemic, but only three of the liens were filed after 2020. She also said that there was an agreement in place "to address the balance due" to the state.

== Electoral history ==
Maryland House of Delegates District 23 Democratic primary election, 2022
Party	Candidate	Votes	%
Democratic	Marvin E. Holmes Jr.	10,382	16.2
Democratic	Adrian Boafo	9,237	14.4
Democratic	Kym Taylor	8,957	14.0
Democratic	Jocelyn Irene Collins	8,938	13.9
Democratic	Monica Roebuck	7,609	11.9
Democratic	Keenon James	6,104	9.5
Democratic	Remi Duyile	3,888	6.1
Democratic	Januari McKay	3,784	5.9
Democratic	Valeria Tomlin	2,630	4.1
Democratic	Jacqui Steele-McCall	2,575	4.0

Maryland House of Delegates District 23 election, 2022
Party	Candidate	Votes	%
Democratic	Marvin E. Holmes Jr.	36,506	33.89
Democratic	Kym Taylor	36,399	33.80
Democratic	Adrian Boafo	33,843	31.42
Write-in		957	0.89
