= Douglas J. J. Peters =

American politician (1963–2023)

Douglas Peters
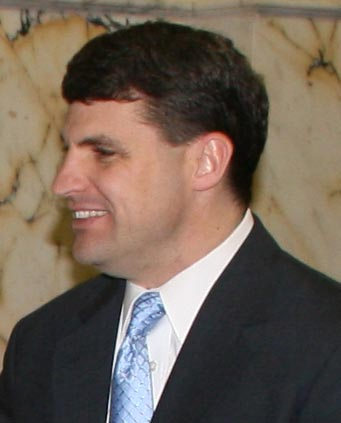

Majority Leader of the Maryland Senate
- In office December 9, 2016 – January 9, 2019
- Preceded by: Catherine Pugh
- Succeeded by: Guy Guzzone

Member of the Maryland Senate from the 23rd district
- In office January 10, 2007 – July 31, 2021
- Preceded by: Leo E. Green
- Succeeded by: Ron Watson

Personal details
- Born: December 28, 1963
- Died: December 30, 2023 (aged 60)
- Party: Democratic
- Children: 6
- Education: University of Maryland, College Park (BS); University of Maryland, Baltimore (MBA)

Military service
- Allegiance: United States
- Branch/service: United States Army
- Years of service: 1988–1998
- Rank: Captain
- Unit: United States Army Reserve
- Battles/wars: Operation Desert Storm
- Awards: Bronze Star

Douglas J. J. Peters (December 28, 1963 – December 30, 2023) was an American politician from Maryland and a member of the Democratic Party. He served in the Maryland State Senate representing the 23rd district in Prince George's County from January 10, 2007 to July 31, 2021. In June 2021, Peters announced he wouldn't seek re-election in 2022; in July 2021, he was appointed to the unpaid University System of Maryland's Board of Regents and announced he would resign from the senate.

== Background ==
Peters grew up in Silver Spring, Maryland and graduated from Springbrook High School where he was a member of the two-time Maryland AA State Championship Football teams in 1979 and 1980. Peters earned a Bachelor of Science in finance from the University of Maryland, College Park and a Master of Business Administration from the University of Baltimore. He became President and Chief Executive Officer of The Peters Group, and through his business became involved with the Prince George's County Chamber of Commerce, Prince George's County Board of Trade and the Greater Washington Board of Trade. Peters was also a Captain in the United States Army Reserve, and earned a Bronze Star Medal during Operation Desert Storm. In 1998, Peters successfully ran for a seat on the city council of Bowie, Maryland, and four years later won a seat on the Prince George's county council.

== In the legislature ==
Peters was elected to the State Senate in 2006 and took office in 2007. He sat on the Budget and Tax Committee and co-chaired the Veteran's Caucus.

Other committees and subcommittees:

- Capital Budget Subcommittee (Member 2008–2021, Vice-Chair 2011–2021)
- Education, Business and Administration Subcommittee (2007)
- Health, Education and Human Resources Subcommittee (2008–10)
- Health and Human Services Subcommittee (2011–2021)
- Special Committee on Substance Abuse (2007–2021)
- Joint Committee on Base Realignment and Closure (2008–2021)
- Joint Committee on Federal Relations (2011–2021)
- Joint Committee on Access to Mental Health (Member 2009–2021; Chair 2011–2021)
- Prince George's County Delegation (Vice-Chair 2008–09; Chair 2009–2021)
- Maryland Doctor's Caucus (Member 2010–2021)
- Southern Legislative Conference (fiscal affairs & government operations committee (Member 2008–2021)

== Personal life and death ==
Peters was married and had six children. He was a member of the Sons of the American Revolution. He was a Catholic.

On December 30, 2023, two days after his 60th birthday, Peters died from complications of multiple myeloma.

Maryland Senate
Preceded by Catherine Pugh	Majority Leader of the Maryland Senate; 2016–2019	Succeeded by Guy Guzzone
