= Maryland Legislative District 23 =

American legislative district

Maryland's legislative district 23
- Represents part of Prince George's County
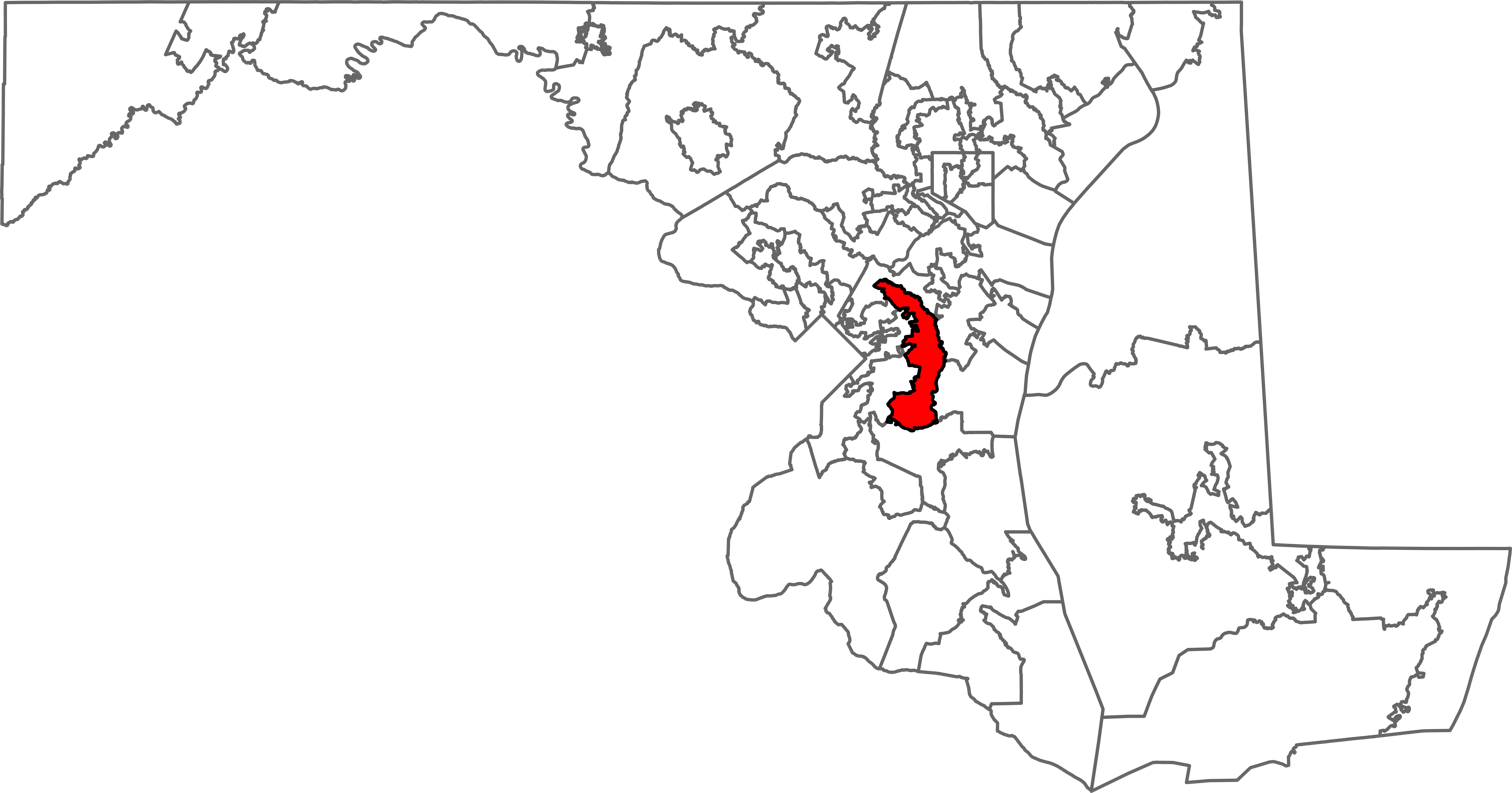
- Senator: Ronald L. Watson (D)
- Delegate(s): Adrian Boafo (D); Marvin E. Holmes Jr. (D); Kym Taylor (D)
- Registration: 74.0% Democratic; 10.0% Republican; 13.9% unaffiliated
- Demographics: 19.0% White; 64.8% Black/African American; 0.4% Native American; 3.7% Asian; 0.0% Hawaiian/Pacific Islander; 5.0% Other race; 6.9% Two or more races; 9.0% Hispanic
- Population (2020): 135,756
- Voting-age population: 106,376
- Registered voters: 100,430

Maryland Legislative District 23 is one of 47 districts in the state for the Maryland General Assembly. It covers part of Prince George's County. Up until the 2020 United States redistricting cycle, the district was divided into two sub-districts for the Maryland House of Delegates: District 23A and District 23B. The district is represented by three delegates in the Maryland House of Delegates.

== Demographic characteristics ==
As of the 2020 United States census, the district had a population of 135,756, of whom 106,376 (78.4%) were of voting age. The racial makeup of the district was 25,827 (19.0%) White, 88,037 (64.8%) African American, 603 (0.4%) Native American, 5,035 (3.7%) Asian, 19 (0.0%) Pacific Islander, 6,820 (5.0%) from some other race, and 9,374 (6.9%) from two or more races. Hispanic or Latino of any race were 12,159 (9.0%) of the population.

The district had 100,430 registered voters as of October 17, 2020, of whom 13,968 (13.9%) were registered as unaffiliated, 10,093 (10.0%) were registered as Republicans, 74,345 (74.0%) were registered as Democrats, and 1,686 (1.7%) were registered to other parties.

== Political representation ==
The district is represented for the 2023–2027 legislative term in the State Senate by Ronald L. Watson (D) and in the House of Delegates by Adrian Boafo (D), Marvin E. Holmes Jr. (D) and Kym Taylor (D).

== Election history ==
Years	Senator	Party	Electoral history
January 8, 1975 – January 12, 1983	Thomas P. O'Reilly	Democratic	Elected in 1974. Re-elected in 1978. Redistricted to the 22nd district.
January 12, 1983 – January 10, 2007	Leo E. Green	Democratic	Elected in 1982. Re-elected in 1986. Re-elected in 1990. Re-elected in 1994. Re-elected in 1998. Re-elected in 2002. Retired.
January 10, 2007 – July 31, 2021	Douglas J. J. Peters	Democratic	Elected in 2006. Re-elected in 2010. Re-elected in 2014. Re-elected in 2018. Resigned.
August 31, 2021 – present	Ron Watson	Democratic	Appointed to serve the remainder of Peters' term. Elected in 2022. Re-elected in 2026.
