= Ron Watson (politician) =

American politician (born 1966)

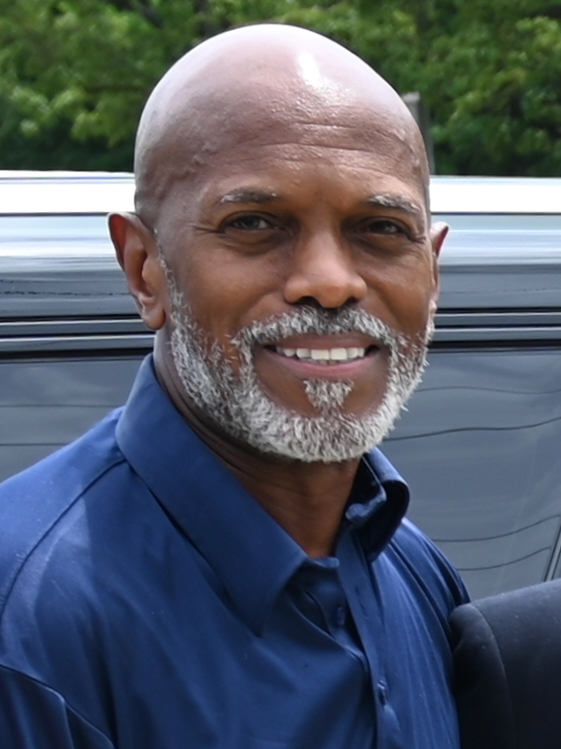
- Watson in 2026

Member of the Maryland Senate from the 23rd district
- Incumbent
- Assumed office August 31, 2021
- Appointed by: Larry Hogan
- Preceded by: Douglas J. J. Peters

Member of the Maryland House of Delegates from the 23B district
- In office January 9, 2019 – August 31, 2021
- Preceded by: Joseph F. Vallario Jr.
- Succeeded by: Cheryl S. Landis

Personal details
- Born: Ronald L. Watson; April 30, 1966 (age 60) Seat Pleasant, Maryland, U.S.
- Party: Democratic
- Spouse: Ingrid
- Children: 3
- Education: Morgan State University (BS); Binghamton University (MS, PhD); George Washington University (MBA)

Military service
- Branch/service: United States Army Reserves
- Years of service: 1989–2006
- Rank: Major

Ronald L. Watson (born April 30, 1966) is an American politician who has served as a member of the Maryland Senate representing District 23 since 2021. A member of the Democratic Party, he previously represented District 23B in the Maryland House of Delegates from 2019 to 2021, and served on the Prince George's County Board of Education from 2006 to 2010.

== Early life and education ==
Watson was born in Washington, D.C. on April 30, 1966. His parents were both retired school principals. Watson graduated from Central High School and attended Morgan State University, where he earned a Bachelor of Science degree in electrical engineering in 1991; Binghamton University, where he earned a Master of Science degree in advanced technology in 1993 and a Doctor of Philosophy degree in systems science in 1999; and George Washington University, where he earned a Master of Business Administration degree in 2002. He is a member of the Kappa Alpha Psi fraternity.

== Career ==
=== Early career ===
Watson served in the U.S. Army Reserves from 1989 to 2006, during which he worked as a program manager at Lockheed Martin, IBM, and MCR. He graduated from the United States Army Command and General Staff College in 2004. Since 2004, Watson has owned his own business, Watson Management Corporation.

In 2006, Watson was elected to the Prince George's County Board of Education. He served in this position until 2010. Watson unsuccessfully ran for the Maryland House of Delegates in District 23B in 2014, challenging incumbents Marvin E. Holmes Jr. and Joseph F. Vallario Jr. He ran for the seat again in 2018, during which he defeated Vallario in a political upset.

=== Maryland General Assembly ===
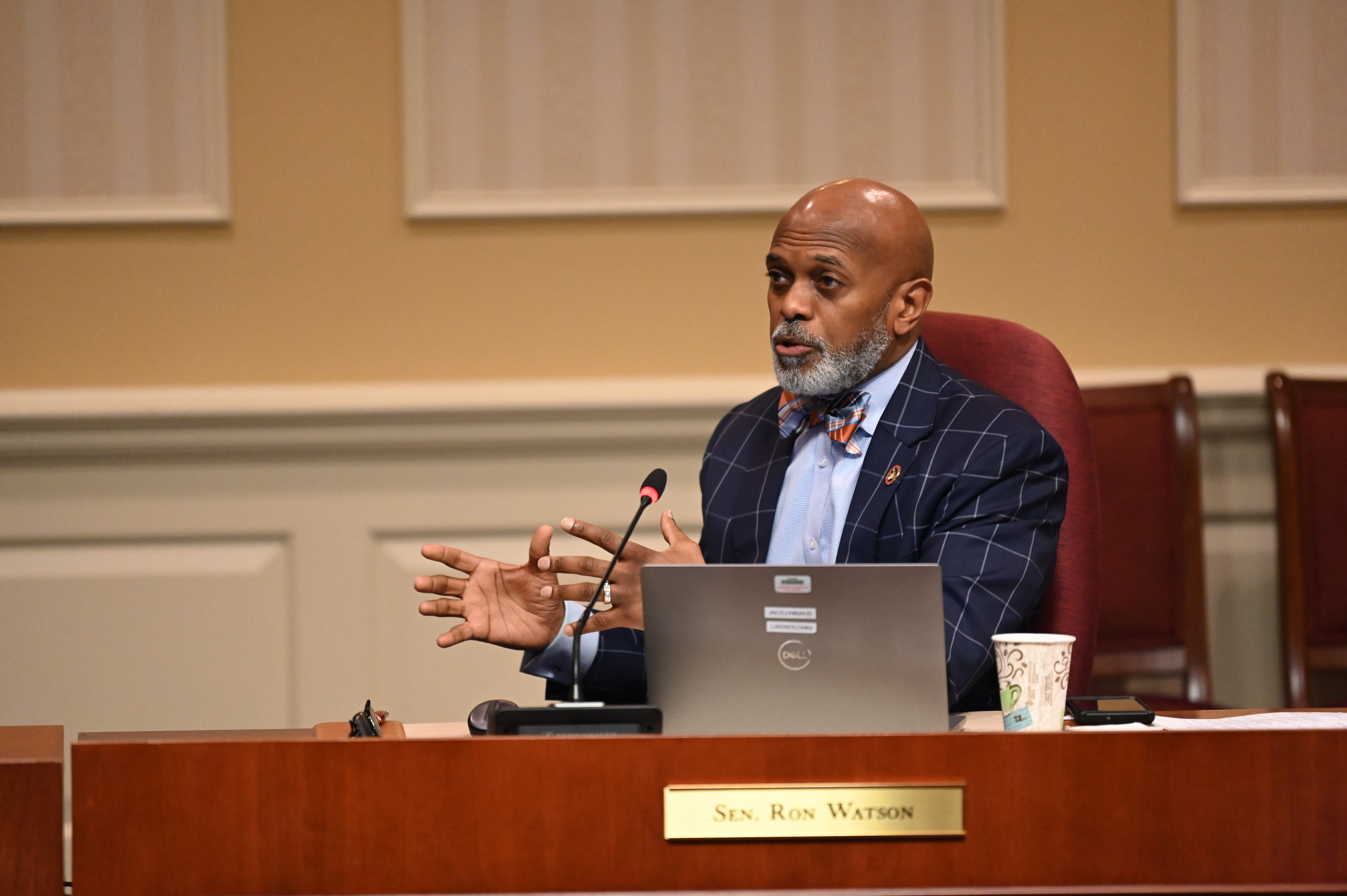
Watson in the Senate Education, Energy, and the Environment Committee, 2024

Watson was sworn into the Maryland House of Delegates on January 9, 2019. During his tenure, he served on the Judiciary Committee, including its family law and juvenile law subcommittees.

In August 2021, following the resignation of state Senator Douglas J. J. Peters, Watson applied to serve the remainder of Peters' term in the Maryland Senate. He was unanimously nominated to the seat by the Prince George's County Democratic Central Committee later that month, and was appointed by Governor Larry Hogan on August 27. Watson was sworn into the Maryland Senate on August 31, and was elected to a full four-year term in the 2022 Senate election. He was a member of the Judicial Proceedings Committee from 2021 to 2023, afterwards serving on the Education, Energy, and the Environment Committee until 2027. He was assigned to the Senate Budget and Taxation Committee at the start of the 2027 legislative session.

In 2024, Watson applied to run as a delegate to the Democratic National Convention pledged to Joe Biden, but was denied by the Maryland Democratic Party.

In July 2025, Watson was appointed as an interim senior adviser to the incoming Prince George's County superintendent of schools. State law does not normally allow General Assembly members to earn pay from secondary jobs in state or local government as a potential conflict of interest. Watson requested an exemption to this law from the Joint Committee on Legislative Ethics, which was denied in October. Watson resigned from the position at the start of December after deciding not to challenge the committee's decision in court. During the 2026 legislative session, he introduced a bill that would allow state legislators to work for a state, county, or local government if they served one elected term in the General Assembly and met other standards, which would allow him to get his job with the Prince George's County Public Schools system back. The bill was converted into a study in the House of Delegates, then died after it failed to pass before the General Assembly adjourned sine die.

== Political positions ==
=== Criminal justice ===
During the 2024 legislative session, Watson said he planned to introduce legislation that would allow parents to waive the requirement that a child must speak to an attorney before speaking to law enforcement and would require parents and children to complete counseling or substance abuse treatment classes administered by the Maryland Department of Social Services. He also supported legislation to extend probationary periods for juveniles found guilty of firearm misdemeanors and felonies.

In March 2026, during debate on a bill to repeal the practice of automatically charging youth as adults for certain crimes, Watson was one of two Democrats to support a Republican amendment to the bill that would require youth charged with first-degree murder to be tried in adult courts.

=== Education ===
In May 2009, after the Maryland General Assembly passed legislation to cut funding for the Prince George's County Public Schools system, Watson voted to terminate the county board of education's $11 million lease for a new headquarters.

=== Electoral reform ===
In February 2026, Watson said he supported pursuing mid-decade redistricting in Maryland and pledged to support a bill that would redraw Maryland's congressional districts to improve the Democratic Party's chances of winning the 1st congressional district, the only congressional district held by Republicans in the state, if it came to the floor for a vote. In March 2026, he opposed a bill that would prohibit nonprofits from engaging in political campaigns in exchange for tax-exempt status, calling it an "attempt to stifle conversation that occurs in Black churches".

=== Environment ===
During the 2022 legislative session, Watson introduced the Climate Equity Act, a bill that would require government agencies to assess the impacts of climate and labor before approving permits or projects, and another bill that would make it illegal to send threats to health officers. He also expressed concerns with proposal to raise the state's eviction notice filing fee from $15 to $65, which he said would penalize small landlords.

=== Gambling ===
During the 2023 legislative session, Watson introduced legislation to create a statewide referendum on legalizing online gambling. In June 2026, Watson suggested that the state could fix its looming deficit problems by legalizing online gambling and minting a Maryland stablecoin, which would generate revenue for the state by collecting interest on the digital currency.

=== Policing ===
During the 2023 legislative session, Watson introduced a bill that would allow municipalities to establish their own police accountability boards. He also supported a bill to raise sentences for illegal gun possession and make knowingly selling someone a weapon used in a crime a felony offense. He also supported efforts to locate the new Federal Bureau of Investigation's headquarters in Prince George's County.

=== Social issues ===
During the 2020 legislative session, Watson criticized a bill that would allow couples to file for divorce while living in the same house, noting that it would allow people to file for divorce because of their spouse's inability to have sex due to a medical condition.

During the 2021 legislative session, Watson introduced legislation creating a statewide referendum on renaming the Maryland Court of Appeals to the Supreme Court of Maryland, which passed and was approved by voters in the 2022 elections. He also introduced a bill to eliminate the four appointed positions from the Prince George's County Board of Education and make all elected positions at-large, which died without a vote.

== Personal life ==
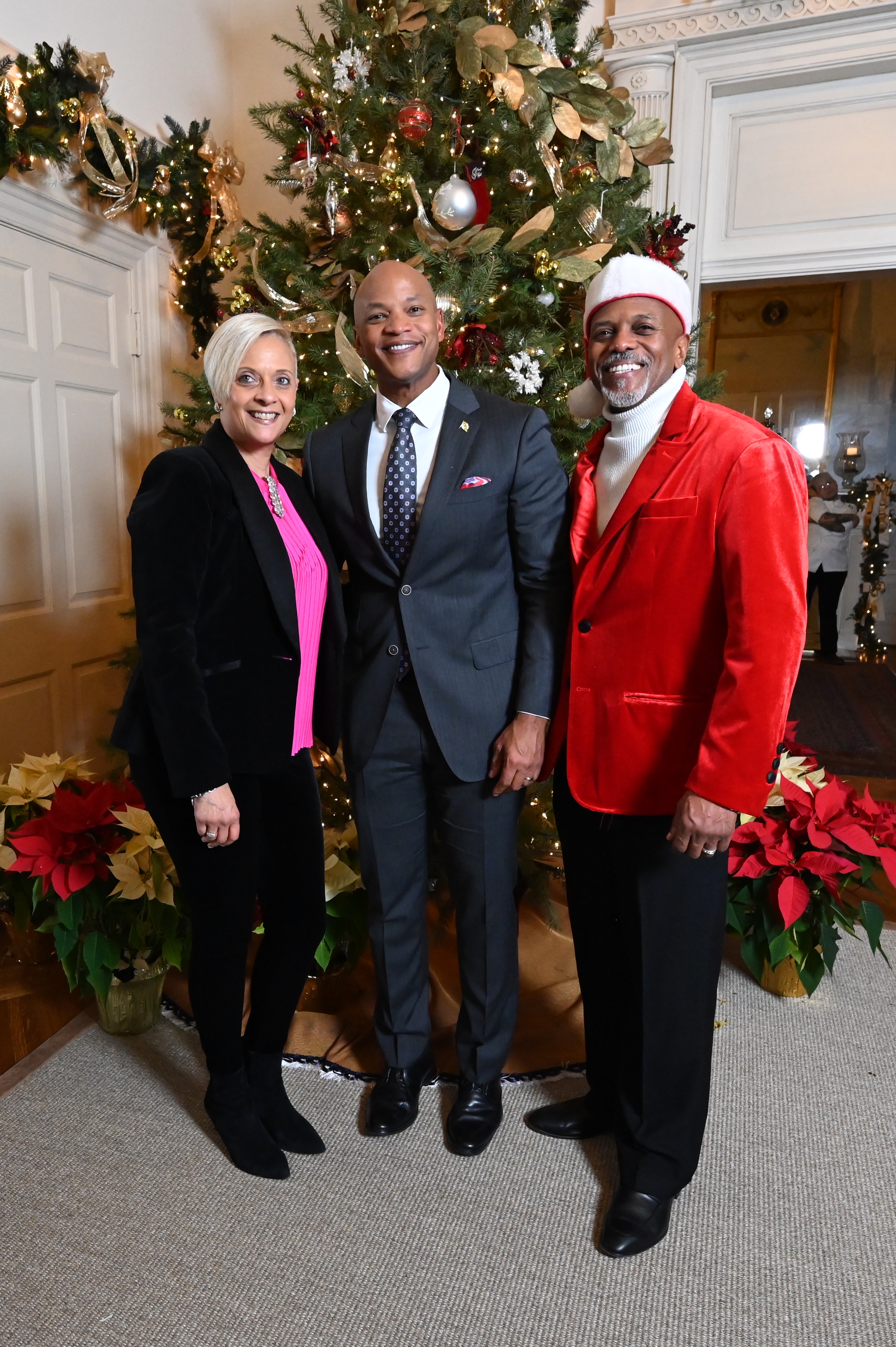
Watson and his wife Ingrid with Governor Wes Moore, 2024

Watson is married to his wife, Ingrid Watson, who was a member of the Prince George's County Council from 2022 to 2026. Together, they have three children. Watson is a congregant at the First Baptist Church of Glenarden.

== Electoral history ==
Maryland House of Delegates District 23B Democratic primary election, 2014
Party	Candidate	Votes	%
Democratic	Marvin E. Holmes Jr. (incumbent)	6,323	32.8
Democratic	Joseph F. Vallario Jr. (incumbent)	5,284	27.4
Democratic	Ron Watson	4,357	22.6
Democratic	Thea Wilson	2,801	14.5
Democratic	Reginald Tyer, Jr.	524	2.7

Maryland House of Delegates District 23B Democratic primary election, 2018
Party	Candidate	Votes	%
Democratic	Ron Watson	8,869	29.5
Democratic	Marvin E. Holmes Jr. (incumbent)	8,287	27.5
Democratic	Joseph F. Vallario Jr. (incumbent)	6,519	21.7
Democratic	Denise Tyler	3,132	10.4
Democratic	Caleb L. Gilchrist	1,420	4.7
Democratic	Pennie Parker	1,106	3.7
Democratic	Paul Manicone	753	2.5

Maryland House of Delegates District 23B election, 2018
Party	Candidate	Votes	%
Democratic	Ron Watson	30,579	50.5
Democratic	Marvin E. Holmes Jr. (incumbent)	29,235	48.3
Write-in		685	1.1

Maryland Senate District 23 Democratic primary election, 2022
Party	Candidate	Votes	%
Democratic	Ron Watson (incumbent)	10,359	42.6
Democratic	Raaheela Ahmed	9,415	38.7
Democratic	Sylvia Johnson	4,567	18.8

Maryland Senate District 23 election, 2022
Party	Candidate	Votes	%
Democratic	Ron Watson (incumbent)	41,343	87.4
Republican	Jesse Peed	5,886	12.4
Write-in		93	0.2
