= Geraldine Valentino-Smith =

American politician (born 1964)

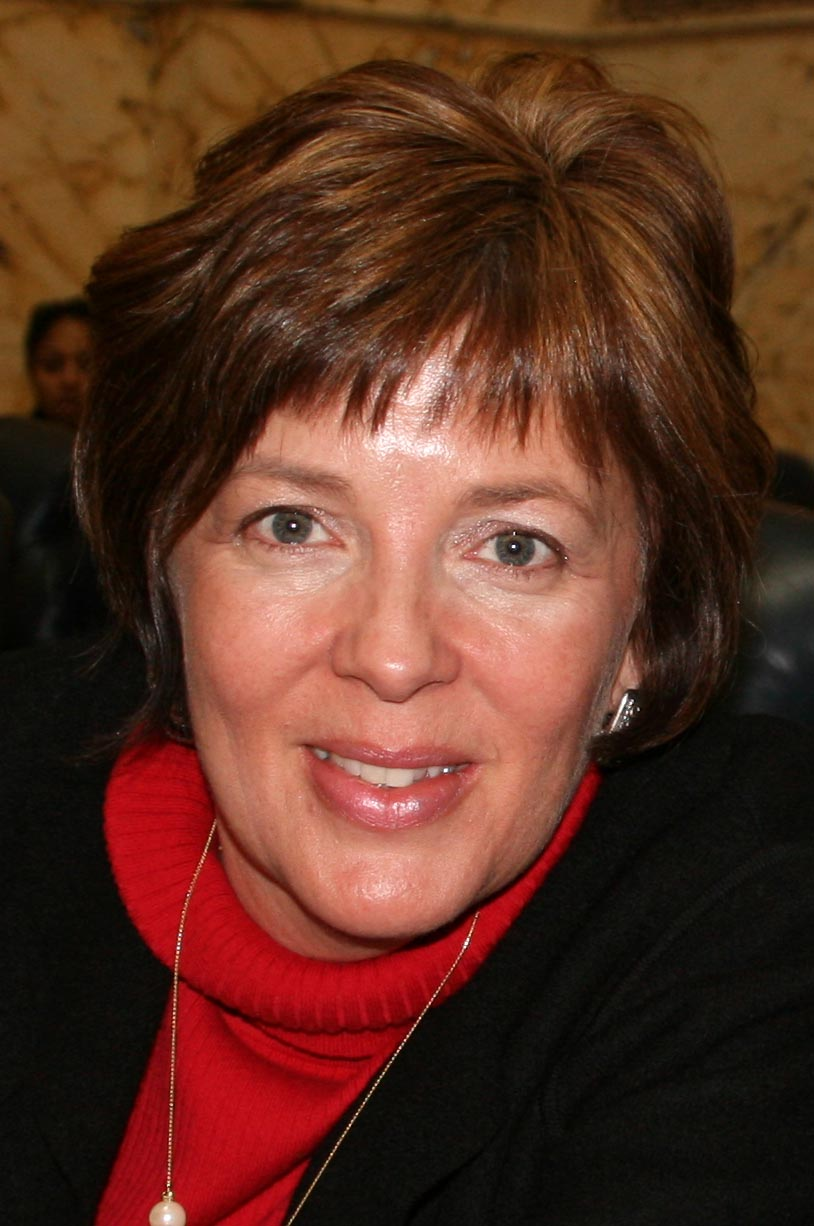

Member of the Maryland House of Delegates from the 23A district
- In office January 12, 2011 – January 11, 2023
- Preceded by: Gerron Levi
- Succeeded by: Adrian Boafo

Member of the Bowie City Council
- In office 2007–2010
- Preceded by: Kevin Conroy
- Succeeded by: Henri Gardner

Personal details
- Born: March 5, 1964 (age 62) Brooklyn, New York, U.S.
- Party: Democratic
- Spouse: Phillip J. Smith
- Children: 3
- Education: Catholic University of America (BS, JD)

Geraldine Valentino-Smith (born March 5, 1964) is an American politician who represented district 23A in the Maryland House of Delegates and a former member of the Bowie City Council.

== Early life and education ==
Valentino Smith was born in Brooklyn, New York. She attended Bowie High School. She received a B.S. degree in nursing from The Catholic University of America in 1987. She is married with three children.

== Career ==
Smith started her career as a clinical nurse with the National Institutes of Health. She received a JD. in 1992 from the Columbus School of Law. She is an Attorney and a member of the Board of Directors of the Prince George's Municipal Association and is the chair of the legislative committee. She is a member of the Committee on Advocacy and Public Policy at the Children's National Medical Center. She is a member of the Board of Directors of the Commonwealth Mutual Insurance Company of America and is on the finance committee. Since 2011 she has served on many state councils, boards, committees and commissions during her tenure in the state house.

She was a member of the Bowie City Council, At Large from 2007 to November 15, 2010. She is a member of the Climate, Energy and Environment Policy Committee, and Metropolitan Development Policy Committee of Metropolitan Washington Council of Governments.

== In the legislature ==
Valentino-Smith was a member of House of Delegates from January 12, 2011 to January 11, 2023. She was appointed to the Judiciary Committee. She was also a member of the Women Legislators of Maryland.

In January 2020, Valentino-Smith was appointed by House Speaker Adrienne A. Jones as the House Chair of the General Assembly's joint Spending Affordability Committee. On March 18, 2020, Jones removed Valentino-Smith as Chair moments after Valentino-Smith voted against a proposal which Jones supported to give the legislature more power over the state budget.
