= 2022 Maryland Attorney General election =

- November 8, 2022
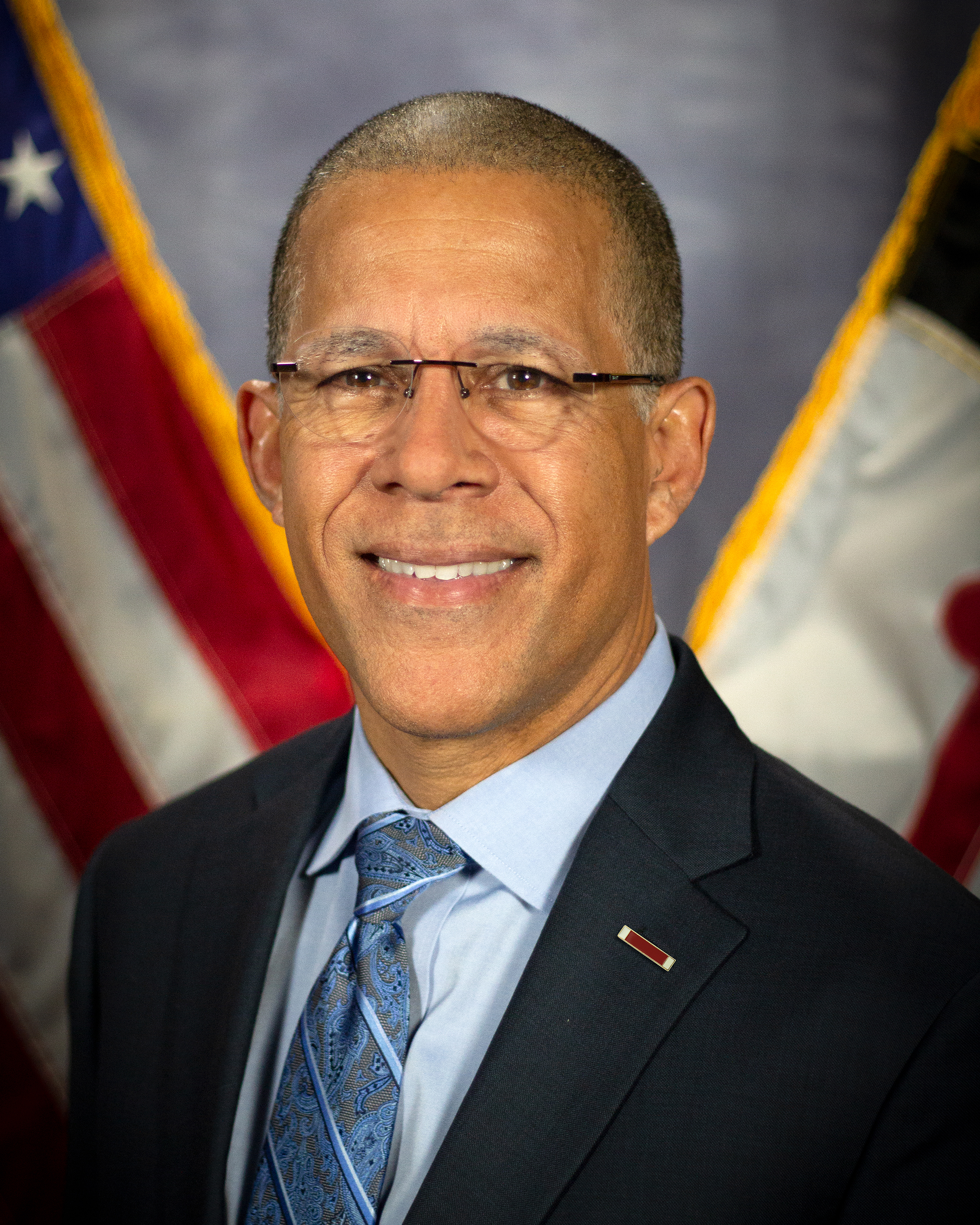

Nominee	Anthony Brown	Michael Peroutka
Party	Democratic	Republican
Popular vote	1,287,418	691,910
Percentage	64.95%	34.90%
- Brown: 50–60% 60–70% 70–80% 80–90% >90% Peroutka: 40–50% 50–60% 60–70% 70–80% 80–90% >90% Tie: 40–50% 50% No votes
Attorney General of Maryland before election
Brian Frosh
Democratic
Elected Attorney General of Maryland
Anthony Brown
Democratic

The Maryland Attorney General election of 2022 was held on November 8, 2022, to elect the Attorney General of Maryland. Incumbent Democratic Attorney General Brian Frosh was eligible to seek a third term in office, but announced that he would retire at the end of his term in early 2023.

U.S. Representative, former Lieutenant Governor, and 2014 gubernatorial nominee Anthony Brown won the Democratic nomination, while Neo-Confederate former Anne Arundel County councilman and 2004 Constitution Party Presidential nominee Michael Peroutka won the Republican nomination. As was expected, Brown won the general election by a wide margin.

== Democratic primary ==
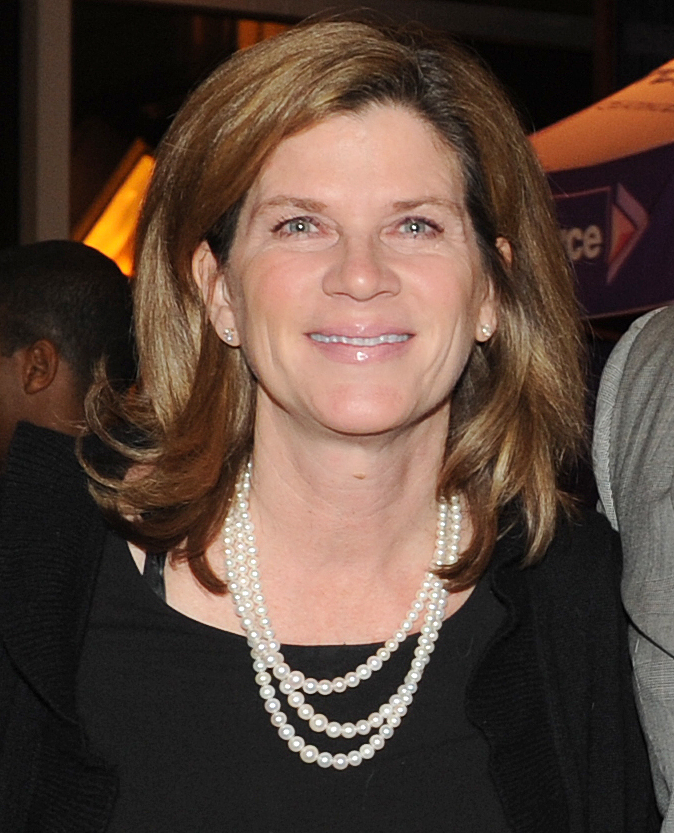
Former district judge Katie O'Malley finished second in the primary.

=== Candidates ===
==== Nominee ====
- Anthony Brown, U.S. Representative for Maryland's 4th congressional district (2017–2023), former lieutenant governor (2007–2015), and nominee for governor in 2014

==== Eliminated in primary ====
- Katie O'Malley, former Baltimore City District Court Judge (2001–2021), former First Lady of Maryland (2007–2015), and daughter of former Maryland Attorney General J. Joseph Curran Jr.

==== Declined ====
- Angela Alsobrooks, Prince George's County executive (2018–present) (ran for re-election; endorsed Brown)
- Vanessa Atterbeary, state delegate for the 13th district (2015–present) (ran for re-election)
- Aisha Braveboy, Prince George's County State's Attorney (2019–present) (endorsed Brown)
- Jon S. Cardin, state delegate for the 11th district (2003–2015, 2019–present), nephew of U.S. Senator Ben Cardin, and candidate for attorney general in 2014 (ran for re-election)
- Elizabeth Embry, assistant to incumbent attorney general Brian Frosh and candidate for Baltimore Mayor in 2016 and lieutenant governor in 2018 (ran for Maryland House of Delegates)
- Brian Feldman, state senator from the 15th district (2013–present) (ran for re-election)
- Brian Frosh, incumbent attorney general (retired)
- Will Jawando, Montgomery County councilmember (2018–present) (endorsed Brown)
- John J. McCarthy, Montgomery County State's Attorney (2006–present) (ran for re-election)
- Marilyn Mosby, Baltimore State's Attorney (2015–2023) (ran for re-election)

=== Endorsements ===
Anthony Brown

U.S. Senators

- Cory Booker, U.S. Senator from New Jersey (2013–present)
- Kirsten Gillibrand, U.S. Senator from New York (2009–present)
- Elizabeth Warren, U.S. Senator from Massachusetts (2013–present)

U.S. Representatives

- Steny Hoyer, U.S. Representative for Maryland's 5th congressional district (1981–present)
- Kweisi Mfume, U.S. Representative for Maryland's 7th congressional district (1987–1996, 2020–present)
- David Trone, U.S. Representative for Maryland's 6th congressional district (2019–present)

Statewide officials

- Dereck E. Davis, Treasurer of Maryland (2021–present)
- Karl Racine, Attorney General for the District of Columbia (2015–2023)

State legislators

- Marlon Amprey, state delegate for the 40th district (2021–present)
- Malcolm Augustine, state senator for the 47th district (2019–present)
- Heather Bagnall, state delegate for the 33rd district (2019–present)
- Ben Barnes, state delegate for the 21st district (2007–present)
- Darryl Barnes, state delegate for the 25th district (2015–present)
- J. Sandy Bartlett, state delegate for the 32nd district (2019–present)
- Joanne C. Benson, state senator for the 24th district (2011–present)
- Chanel Branch, state delegate for the 45th district (2020–present)
- Talmadge Branch, state delegate for the 45th district (1995–present)
- Benjamin Brooks, state delegate for the 10th district (2015–present)
- Jill P. Carter, state senator for the 41st district (2018–present)
- Nick Charles, state delegate for the 25th district (2019–present)
- Charlotte Crutchfield, state delegate for the 19th district (2019–present)
- Debra Davis, state delegate for the 28th district (2019–present)
- Brian Feldman, state senator for the 15th district (2013–present)
- Diana M. Fennell, state delegate for district 47A (2015–present)
- Wanika Fisher, state delegate for district 47B (2019–present)
- Melony G. Griffith, state senator for the 25th district (2019–present)
- Andrea Harrison, state delegate for the 24th district (2019–present)
- Antonio Hayes, state senator for the 40th district (2019–present)
- Anne Healey, state delegate for the 22nd district (1991–present)
- Marvin E. Holmes Jr., state delegate for district 23B (2003–present)
- Faye Martin Howell, state delegate for the 24th district (2021–present)
- Julian Ivey, state delegate for district 47A (2019–present)
- Michael A. Jackson, state senator for the 27th district (2021–present)
- Adrienne A. Jones, 107th Speaker of the Maryland House of Delegates (2019–present) from the 10th district (1997–present)
- Rachel Jones, state delegate for district 27B (2021–present)
- Benjamin F. Kramer, state senator for the 19th district (2019–present)
- Cheryl S. Landis, state delegate for district 23B (2021–present)
- Jazz Lewis, state delegate for the 24th district (2017–present)
- Cory V. McCray, state senator for the 45th district (2019–present)
- Edith J. Patterson, state delegate for the 28th district (2015–present)
- Obie Patterson, state senator for the 26th district (2019–present)
- Paul G. Pinsky, state senator for the 22nd district (1994–present)
- Susie Proctor, state delegate for district 27A (2015–present)
- Mike Rogers, state delegate for the 32nd district (2019–present)
- Sheree Sample-Hughes, Speaker pro tempore of the Maryland House of Delegates (2019–present) from the district 37A (2015–present)
- Stephanie M. Smith, state delegate for the 45th district (2019–present)
- William C. Smith Jr., state senator for the 20th district (2016–present)
- Charles E. Sydnor III, state senator for the 44th district (2020–present)
- Karen Toles, state delegate for the 25th district (2022–present)
- Veronica L. Turner, state delegate for the 26th district (2019–present)
- Kris Valderrama, state delegate for the 26th district (2007–present)
- Geraldine Valentino-Smith, state delegate for district 23A (2011–present)
- Alonzo Washington, state delegate for the 22nd district (2012–present)
- Ron Watson, state senator for the 23rd district (2021–present)
- Melissa Wells, state delegate for the 40th district (2019–present)
- Jheanelle Wilkins, state delegate for the 20th district (2017–present)
- Nicole A. Williams, state delegate for the 22nd district (2019–present)
- C. T. Wilson, state delegate for the 28th district (2011–present)

Local officials

- Angela Alsobrooks, Prince George's County executive (2018–present)
- Aisha N. Braveboy, Prince George's County State's Attorney (2019–present)
- Jacob R. Day, mayor of Salisbury (2015–present)
- Jolene Ivey, Prince George's County council member (2018–present)
- Will Jawando, Montgomery County councilmember (2018–present)
- Sidney A. Katz, Montgomery County councilmember (2014–present)
- Ike Leggett, former Montgomery County executive (2006–2018)
- Nick Mosby, President of the Baltimore City Council (2020–present)
- Craig L. Rice, Montgomery County councilmember (2010–present)

Judges

- Billy Murphy Jr., former Baltimore City circuit court judge (1980–1983) and civil rights attorney
- Alexander Williams Jr., former senior judge on the United States District Court for the District of Maryland (2013–2014) and United States district court judge (1994–2013)

Labor unions

- Amalgamated Transit Union Local 689
- American Federation of Government Employees
- American Federation of State, County and Municipal Employees Council 3
- American Federation of State, County and Municipal Employees Council 67
- American Federation of State, County and Municipal Employees Council 2250
- American Federation of Teachers Maryland
- Brotherhood of Railroad Signalmen
- Communications Workers of America Maryland/DC State Council
- International Alliance of Theatrical Stage Employees Local 487
- International Brotherhood of Electrical Workers Local 24
- International Brotherhood of Electrical Workers Local 26
- International Brotherhood of Electrical Workers Local 70
- International Brotherhood of Electrical Workers Local 307
- International Union of Painters and Allied Trades District Council 51
- Maryland State and District of Columbia AFL–CIO
- Mid-Atlantic Region of the Laborers' International Union of North America
- SEIU 1199
- SEIU 32BJ
- Teamsters Joint Council 55
- Transport Workers Union of America
- UNITE HERE Local 7
- UNITE HERE Local 23
- UNITE HERE Local 25
- United Association of Union Plumbers and Pipefitters
- United Food and Commercial Workers Local 27
- United Food and Commercial Workers Local 400
- United Food and Commercial Workers Local 1994

Organizations

- CASA in Action
- The Collective PAC
- Maryland REALTORS® Political Action Committee
- Maryland Sierra Club
- Maryland State Education Association
- National Nurses Organizing Committee
- Prince George's Muslim Council
- Pro-Choice Maryland
- VoteVets.org

Newspapers

- Baltimore Afro-American
Katie O'Malley

U.S. Senators

- Barbara Mikulski, former U.S. Senator from Maryland (1987–2017)

U.S. Representatives

- Michael D. Barnes, former U.S. Representative for Maryland's eighth congressional district (1979–1987)
- Beverly Byron, former U.S. Representative for Maryland's sixth congressional district (1979–1993)

Statewide officials

- Parris Glendening, former Governor of Maryland (1995–2003)
- Nancy Kopp, former Treasurer of Maryland (2002–2021)

State legislators

- Lisa Belcastro, state delegate for the 11th district (2020–present)
- Regina Boyce, state delegate for the 43rd district (2019–present)
- Ned Carey, state delegate for district 31A (2015–present)
- Julie Palakovich Carr, state delegate for the 17th district (2019–present)
- Lorig Charkoudian, state delegate for the 20th district (2019–present)
- Bonnie Cullison, state delegate for the 19th district (2011–present)
- Eric Ebersole, state delegate for the 12th district (2015–present)
- Cathi Forbes, state delegate for district 42A (2019–present)
- James W. Gilchrist, state delegate for the 17th district (2007–present)
- Michele Guyton, state delegate for district 42B (2019–present)
- Katie Fry Hester, state senator for the 9th district (2019–present)
- Terri L. Hill, state delegate for the 12th district (2015–present)
- Carl W. Jackson, state delegate for the 8th district (2019–present)
- Anne Kaiser, state delegate for the 14th district (2003–present)
- Ariana Kelly, state delegate for the 16th district (2011–present)
- Nancy King, Majority Leader of the Maryland Senate (2020–present) from the 39th district (2007–present)
- Kathy Klausmeier, state senator for the 8th district (2002–present)
- Susan C. Lee, state senator for the 16th district (2015–present)
- Robbyn Lewis, state delegate for the 46th district (2017–present)
- Lesley Lopez, state delegate for the 39th district (2019–present)
- Sara N. Love, state delegate for the 16th district (2019–present)
- Eric Luedtke, Majority Leader of the Maryland House of Delegates (2019–present) from the 14th district (2011–present)
- Maggie McIntosh, state delegate for the 43rd district (2003–present)
- Shane Pendergrass, state delegate for the 13th district (1995–present)
- Sheila Ruth, state delegate for district 44B (2020–present)
- Dana Stein, state delegate for the 11th district (2007–present)
- Vaughn Stewart, state delegate for the 19th district (2019–present)
- Courtney Watson, state delegate for district 9B (2019–present)
- Karen Lewis Young, state delegate for district 3A (2015–present)
- Pat Young, state delegate for district 44B (2015–present)
- Ronald N. Young, state senator for the 3rd district (2011–present)

Local officials

- Jerry Donald, Frederick County councilmember (2014–present)
- Jan Gardner, Frederick County executive (2014–2022)
- James T. Smith Jr., former Baltimore County executive (2002–2010)
- Bernard Young, former mayor of Baltimore (2019–2020)

Judges

- Mary Ellen Barbera, former Chief Judge of the Maryland Court of Appeals (2013–2021)

Individuals

- Cecile Richards, former President of Planned Parenthood (2006–2018)

Labor unions

- Baltimore County Fire Department and Paramedics/IAFF Local 1311
- International Association of Fire Fighters Local 1311
- International Federation of Professional and Technical Engineers
- Teamsters Joint Council No. 62

Organizations

- Chesapeake Climate Action Network Action Fund
- Coalition of Pacific American Democrats of Maryland
- EMILY's List
- Lower Shore Progressive Caucus
- Maryland League of Conservation Voters

Newspapers

- The Baltimore Sun (Democratic primary only)
- The Washington Post (Democratic primary only)

=== Debates and forums ===
2022 Maryland Democratic Attorney General primary debates
No.	Date	Host	Moderator	Link	Participants	
P Participant A Absent N Non-invitee I Invitee W Withdrawn						
P Participant A Absent N Non-invitee I Invitee W Withdrawn					Anthony Brown	Katie O'Malley
1	May 20, 2022	Maryland League of Conservation Voters	Staci Hartwell	YouTube	P	P
2	May 25, 2022	League of Women Voters; Maryland Matters	Len Lazarick	Panopto	P	P

=== Fundraising ===
Primary campaign finance activity through July 3, 2022
Candidate	Raised	Spent	Cash on hand
Anthony Brown	$1,820,422	$1,461,455	$360,864
Katie O'Malley	$1,450,509	$1,245,657	$204,853
Source: Maryland State Board of Elections

=== Polling ===
Poll source	Date(s) administered	Sample size (Note: Key: A – all adults RV – registered voters LV – likely voters V – unclear)	Margin of error	Anthony Brown	Katie O'Malley	Other	Undecided
Goucher College	June 15–19, 2022	403 (LV)	± 4.9%	29%	30%	5%	36%
OpinionWorks	May 27 – June 2, 2022	562 (LV)	± 4.1%	42%	29%	1%	27%
Garin-Hart-Yang Research Group (D) (Note: This poll was sponsored by Anthony Brown's campaign)	April 27 – May 1, 2022	600 (LV)	± 4.0%	44%	25%	–	28%
Garin-Hart-Yang Research Group (D)	November 8–11, 2021	500 (LV)	± 4.5%	46%	23%	–	31%

=== Results ===
Results by county: Brown: 50–60%; 70–80%; 80–90%; O'Malley: 50–60%; 60–70%

Results by precinct: Brown: 50–60%; 60–70%; 70–80%; 80–90%; >90%; O'Malley: 50–60%; 60–70%; 70–80%; 80–90%; >90%; Tie No data/No votes

Democratic primary results
Party	Candidate	Votes	%
Democratic	Anthony Brown	362,882	55.06%
Democratic	Katie O'Malley	296,183	44.94%
Total votes		659,065	100.0%

== Republican primary ==
=== Candidates ===
==== Nominee ====
- Michael Peroutka, lawyer, former Anne Arundel County councilman (2014–2018), and Constitution Party nominee for president in 2004

==== Eliminated in primary ====
- Jim Shalleck, prosecutor and former chair of the Montgomery County Board of Elections (2015–2021)

=== Endorsements ===
Michael Peroutka

State legislators

- Dan Cox, state delegate for the 4th district (2019–2023)

Organizations

- Maryland Right to Life
- Stand for Health Freedom
Jim Shalleck

Statewide officials

- Larry Hogan, 62nd Governor of Maryland (2015–2023)

Organizations

- Fraternal Order of Police Lodge 35

Newspapers

- The Baltimore Sun (Republican primary only)
- The Washington Post (Republican primary only)

=== Debates and forums ===
2022 Maryland Republican Attorney General primary debates
No.	Date	Host	Moderator	Link	Participants	
P Participant A Absent N Non-invitee I Invitee W Withdrawn						
P Participant A Absent N Non-invitee I Invitee W Withdrawn					Michael Peroutka	Jim Shalleck
1	May 20, 2022	Maryland League of Conservation Voters	Staci Hartwell	YouTube	A	P
2	May 24, 2022	League of Women Voters; Maryland Matters	Len Lazarick	Panopto	A	P

=== Fundraising ===
Primary campaign finance activity through July 3, 2022
Candidate	Raised	Spent	Cash on hand
Michael Peroutka	$49,735	$22,345	$27,390
Jim Shalleck	$15,153	$13,093	$2,102
Source: Maryland State Board of Elections

=== Polling ===
Poll source	Date(s) administered	Sample size	Margin of error	Michael Peroutka	Jim Shalleck	Other	Undecided
Goucher College	June 15–19, 2022	414 (LV)	± 4.8%	17%	11%	2%	69%
OpinionWorks	May 27 – June 2, 2022	428 (LV)	± 4.7%	19%	18%	1%	63%

=== Results ===
Results by county Peroutka: 50–60%; 60–70%; Shalleck: 50–60%

Republican primary results
Party	Candidate	Votes	%
Republican	Michael Peroutka	135,915	54.98%
Republican	Jim Shalleck	111,276	45.02%
Total votes		247,191	100.0%

== General election ==
=== Debates and forums ===
2022 Maryland Attorney General debates
No.	Date	Host	Moderator	Link	Democratic	Republican
P Participant A Absent N Non-invitee I Invitee W Withdrawn						
P Participant A Absent N Non-invitee I Invitee W Withdrawn					Anthony Brown	Michael Peroutka
1	August 20, 2022	Maryland Association of Counties	Mileah Kromer; Pamela Wood	N/A	P	P
2	October 12, 2022	Maryland League of Women Voters	Len Lazarick	YouTube I YouTube II	P	P

=== Predictions ===
Source	Ranking	As of
Sabato's Crystal Ball	Safe D	September 14, 2022
Elections Daily	Safe D	November 1, 2022

=== Post-primary endorsements ===
Anthony Brown (D)

Executive Branch officials

- Joe Biden, 46th President of the United States (2021–2025), 47th Vice President of the United States (2009–2017), and former U.S. Senator from Delaware (1973–2009)
- Kamala Harris, 49th Vice President of the United States (2021–2025), and former U.S. Senator from California (2017–2021)

U.S. Senators

- Ben Cardin, U.S. Senator from Maryland (2007–2025)
- Chris Van Hollen, U.S. Senator from Maryland (2017–present)

Statewide officials

- Brian Frosh, Attorney General of Maryland (2015–2023)

State legislators

- Brooke Lierman, state delegate for the 46th district (2015–2023) and nominee for Comptroller in 2022

Party officials

- Democratic Attorneys General Association

Labor unions

- International Brotherhood of Teamsters
- Maryland Fraternal Order of Police
- National Nurses United
- SEIU Local 500
- United Auto Workers

Organizations

- Black Economic Alliance
- Chesapeake Climate Action Network Action Fund
- End Citizens United
- Everytown for Gun Safety
- Giffords
- Let America Vote
- Maryland Farm Bureau
- Planned Parenthood Action Fund

Newspapers

- The Baltimore Sun
- The Washington Post
Michael Peroutka (R)

Statewide officials

- Bob Ehrlich, 60th Governor of Maryland (2003–2007)
Declined to endorse

Statewide officials

- Larry Hogan, 62nd Governor of Maryland (2015–2023) (Republican)

State legislators

- Bryan Simonaire, Minority Leader of the Maryland Senate (2020–2022) and state senator from the 31st district (2007–present) (Republican)

Local officials

- Barry Glassman, Harford County executive (2014–2023) and nominee for comptroller in 2022 (Republican)

=== Fundraising ===
Primary campaign finance activity through October 23, 2022
Candidate	Raised	Spent	Cash on hand
Anthony Brown	$2,584,025	$2,094,812	$491,110
Michael Peroutka	$160,923	$149,439	$11,484
Source: Maryland State Board of Elections

=== Polling ===
Poll source	Date(s) administered	Sample size	Margin of error	Anthony Brown (D)	Michael Peroutka (R)	Other	Undecided
OpinionWorks	October 20–23, 2022	982 (LV)	± 3.1%	60%	28%	2% (Note: "Prefer not to say" with 2%)	9%
Goucher College	September 8–12, 2022	748 (LV)	± 3.6%	53%	31%	1% (Note: "Some other candidate" (volunteered response) with 1%)	15%

=== Results ===
2022 Maryland Attorney General election
Party	Candidate	Votes	%	±%
Democratic	Anthony Brown	1,287,418	64.95%	+0.18%
Republican	Michael Peroutka	691,910	34.90%	−0.21%
Write-in		2,962	0.15%	+0.07%
Total votes		1,982,290	100.0%	
Democratic hold				

==== By county ====
By county

County	Anthony Brown Democratic		Michael Peroutka Republican		Write-in	
County	#	%	#	%	#	%
Allegany	6,994	32.7%	14,382	67.2%	16	0.1%
Anne Arundel	121,096	56.8%	91,718	43.0%	433	0.2%
Baltimore	170,858	62.9%	100,480	37.0%	467	0.2%
Baltimore City	128,282	89.6%	14,954	10.2%	288	0.2%
Calvert	16,647	45.0%	20,275	54.9%	41	0.1%
Caroline	3,475	32.7%	7,128	67.1%	13	0.1%
Carroll	26,928	37.8%	44,195	62.0%	112	0.2%
Cecil	11,844	36.3%	20,750	63.6%	35	0.1%
Charles	37,945	70.2%	16,042	29.7%	55	0.1%
Dorchester	4,784	41.9%	6,615	58.0%	16	0.1%
Frederick	56,647	54.0%	48,214	45.9%	112	0.1%
Garrett	2,611	23.5%	8,497	76.49%	5	0.01%
Harford	43,532	42.6%	58,519	57.3%	48	0.1%
Howard	89,144	69.5%	38,990	30.4%	215	0.2%
Kent	4,284	51.6%	4,008	48.3%	7	0.1%
Montgomery	268,545	79.6%	68,388	20.3%	529	0.2%
Prince George's	216,625	91.3%	20,434	8.6%	302	0.1%
Queen Anne's	8,392	37.2%	14,134	62.7%	24	0.1%
Somerset	2,613	38.5%	4,176	61.5%	6	0.1%
St. Mary's	15,377	41.4%	21,738	58.5%	36	0.1%
Talbot	8,681	49.9%	8,689	50.0%	19	0.1%
Washington	18,805	39.2%	29,147	60.7%	41	0.1%
Wicomico	14,215	46.8%	16,158	53.2%	23	0.1%
Worcester	9,094	38.3%	14,639	61.6%	19	0.1%
Totals	1,287,418	64.95%	691,910	34.9%	2,962	0.15%

==== By congressional district ====
Brown won seven of eight congressional districts.

District	Brown	Peroutka	Representative
1st	42%	58%	Andy Harris
2nd	60%	40%	Dutch Ruppersberger
3rd	61%	39%	John Sarbanes
4th	91%	9%	Anthony Brown (117th Congress)
4th	91%	9%	Glenn Ivey (118th Congress)
5th	67%	33%	Steny Hoyer
6th	53%	47%	David Trone
7th	83%	17%	Kweisi Mfume
8th	81%	19%	Jamie Raskin

== Notes ==
Partisan clients

== See also ==
- Elections in Maryland
- 2022 United States elections
- 2022 Maryland gubernatorial election
- 2022 Maryland Comptroller election
- 2022 United States Senate election in Maryland
- 2022 United States House of Representatives elections in Maryland
