= Angela Angel =

American politician (born 1979)

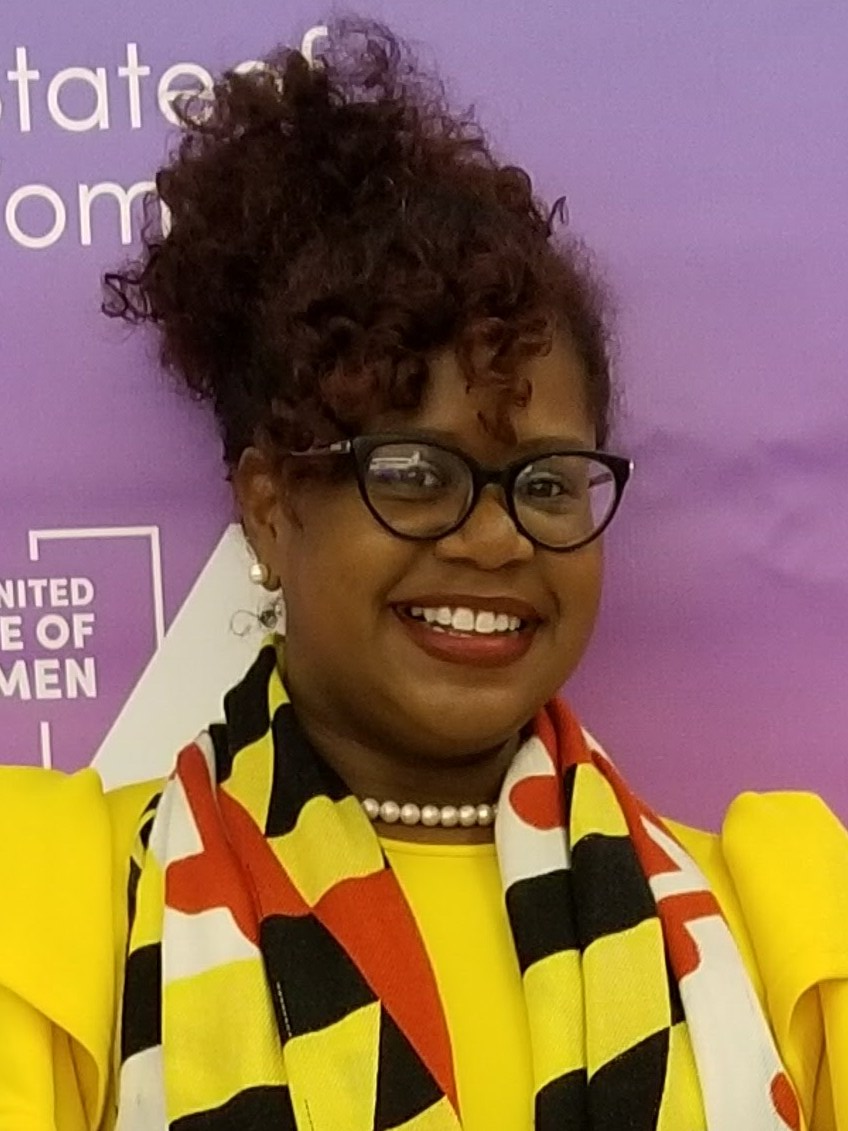
- Angel at the United State of Women Summit in 2018

Member of the Maryland House of Delegates from the 25th district
- In office January 11, 2015 – January 9, 2019 Serving with Dereck E. Davis and Darryl Barnes
- Preceded by: Aisha Braveboy
- Succeeded by: Nick Charles

Personal details
- Born: December 26, 1979 (age 46) South Bend, Indiana, United States
- Party: Democratic
- Children: 5
- Occupation: Attorney

Angela Angel (born December 26, 1979) is an American politician who represented District 25 in the Maryland House of Delegates from 2015 to 2019. A member of the Democratic Party, she ran for Congress in Maryland's 4th congressional district in 2022.

== Background ==
Angel was born in South Bend, Indiana. She received her undergraduate degree at Virginia's Hampton University. Angel then graduated from the Benjamin N. Cardozo School of Law at Yeshiva University, where she received her Juris Doctor in 2004. She graduated with Honors and a specialization in Alternative Dispute Resolution. She served as a judicial fellow to Judge James A. Yates of the New York Supreme Court from 2004 to 2005. She was admitted to New York Bar in 2005.

Angel first got involved with politics in 2000, when she worked as a legislative aide to Virginia State Delegate Mary T. Christian. In 2010, Angel served as the principal coordinator for policy and politics in Prince George's County for Governor Martin O'Malley, and later served as legislator director for the Prince George's County Delegation until 2011. From there, she worked as an Education and Social Services Specialist for the Prince George's County Council until 2014, when she began working as the Legislative Affairs Counsel for the Prince George's Department of Environmental Protection.

== In the legislature ==
From 2015 to 2019, Angel served on the Health and Government Operations committee in the Maryland House of Delegates. She was also a member of the Legislative Black Caucus of Maryland.

In March 2018, Angel said that she was sexually harassed while working in the Maryland General Assembly, saying that she "felt defenseless when she was accosted in front of other people and no one came to her defense".

Angel announced that she would run for the Maryland Senate on November 8, 2017, seeking to succeed retiring state Senator Ulysses Currie. She lost the Democratic primary to former state Delegate Melony G. Griffith, receiving 36.8 percent of the vote to Griffith's 55.0 percent.

== Post-legislative career ==
In April 2023, Angel applied to fill a vacancy in District 25 of the Maryland House of Delegates left by the resignation of Darryl Barnes. In May 2023, the Prince George's County Democratic Central Committee unanimously voted to nominate its chair, Kent Roberson, to succeed Barnes. In December 2023, Angel again applied to fill a vacancy in District 25 of the House of Delegates left by the appointment of Nick Charles to the Maryland Senate. The Prince George's County Democratic Central Committee voted to nominate Denise Roberts to the seat over Angel.

On December 20, 2021, Angel announced that she would run for Congress in Maryland's 4th congressional district. She was defeated in the Democratic primary on July 19, 2022, placing third behind former Prince George's County State's Attorney Glenn Ivey and former Congresswoman Donna Edwards.

In July 2024, after Prince George's County councilmember Mel Franklin resigned from his at-large seat on the county council, Angel filed to run in the special election to succeed Franklin. She was defeated by Jolene Ivey in the Democratic primary on August 6, 2024.

In 2026, Angel ran for the Maryland House of Delegates in District 25, but was defeated in the Democratic primary by incumbents Denise Roberts, Karen Toles, and Kent Roberson.

== Personal life ==
In June 2012, Angel briefly lived in a homeless shelter after escaping an abusive marriage. She is a single mother of five children. She is Catholic.

== Political positions ==
=== Development initiatives ===
During her House campaign, Angel said that she would support efforts to bring the FBI headquarters to Prince George's County.

=== Education ===
During her House campaign, Angel said that she supported universal pre-K.

=== Health care ===
In 2018, Angel was a sponsor of the Healthy Maryland Act, a bill that would establish a universal single-payer healthcare system in Maryland.

=== Immigration ===
In November 2015, Angel signed a letter condemning Governor Larry Hogan's decision to block Syrian refugees from resettling to Maryland.

=== Social issues ===
During the 2016 legislative session, Angel introduced legislation to change the definition of abuse to include harassment and malicious destruction of property. The bill died in the House Judicial Proceedings Committee, prompting Angel to attach her legislation as an amendment, which passed the House with a vote of 65–60, to a domestic-violence-related bill introduced by state Senator Victor R. Ramirez. Veteran lawmakers accused Angel of violating constitutional rules by making this move, with House parliamentarian William Frick arguing that reviving a dead bill by grafting it onto a live bill "upends the integrity of the committee system that first put the brakes on Angel's legislation". The House passed Ramirez's bill as amended, but the legislation died in the Senate.

Angel supported a 2018 historically Black colleges and universities lawsuit against the state of Maryland, saying that "institutions with predominantly Black student bodies should be given equitable funding by the state with those with White students in the majority".

== Electoral history ==
Maryland House of Delegates District 25 Democratic primary election, 2014
Party	Candidate	Votes	%
Democratic	Dereck E. Davis	9,088	25.7
Democratic	Angela Angel	7,104	20.1
Democratic	Darryl Barnes	5,702	16.1
Democratic	Juanita D. Miller	3,804	10.8
Democratic	Nick Charles	3,032	8.6
Democratic	Matthew Fogg	1,713	4.8
Democratic	Tony Jones	1,498	4.2
Democratic	Geraldine Gerry Eggleston	1,299	3.7
Democratic	Larry R. Greenhill	1,094	3.1
Democratic	Stanley Onye	1,014	2.9

Maryland House of Delegates District 25 election, 2014
Party	Candidate	Votes	%
Democratic	Angela Angel	26,792	36.2
Democratic	Dereck E. Davis	23,593	31.9
Democratic	Darryl Barnes	23,372	31.6
Write-in		161	0.2

Maryland Senate District 25 Democratic primary election, 2018
Party	Candidate	Votes	%
Democratic	Melony G. Griffith	10,939	55.0
Democratic	Angela M. Angel	7,320	36.8
Democratic	Jonathan Edward Rosero	1,641	8.2

Maryland's 4th congressional district Democratic primary election, 2022
Party	Candidate	Votes	%
Democratic	Glenn Ivey	42,791	51.8
Democratic	Donna Edwards	29,114	35.2
Democratic	Angela Angel	4,678	5.7
Democratic	Tammy Allison	1,726	2.1
Democratic	Kim A. Shelton	1,354	1.6
Democratic	Gregory Holmes	1,024	1.2
Democratic	James Curtis Jr.	763	0.9
Democratic	Matthew Fogg	663	0.8
Democratic	Robert K. McGhee	549	0.7

Prince George's County Council At-Large Democratic special primary election, 2024
Party	Candidate	Votes	%
Democratic	Jolene Ivey	29,698	47.54
Democratic	Tim Adams	19,061	30.51
Democratic	Tamara Davis Brown	5,723	9.16
Democratic	Angela Angel	3,371	5.40
Democratic	Marvin E. Holmes Jr.	1,473	2.36
Democratic	Gabriel Njinimbot	1,176	1.88
Democratic	Kiesha D. Lewis (withdrawn)	859	1.38
Democratic	Judy Mickens-Murray	688	1.10
Democratic	Leo Bachi Eyomobo	416	0.67
