= Darryl Barnes =

American politician

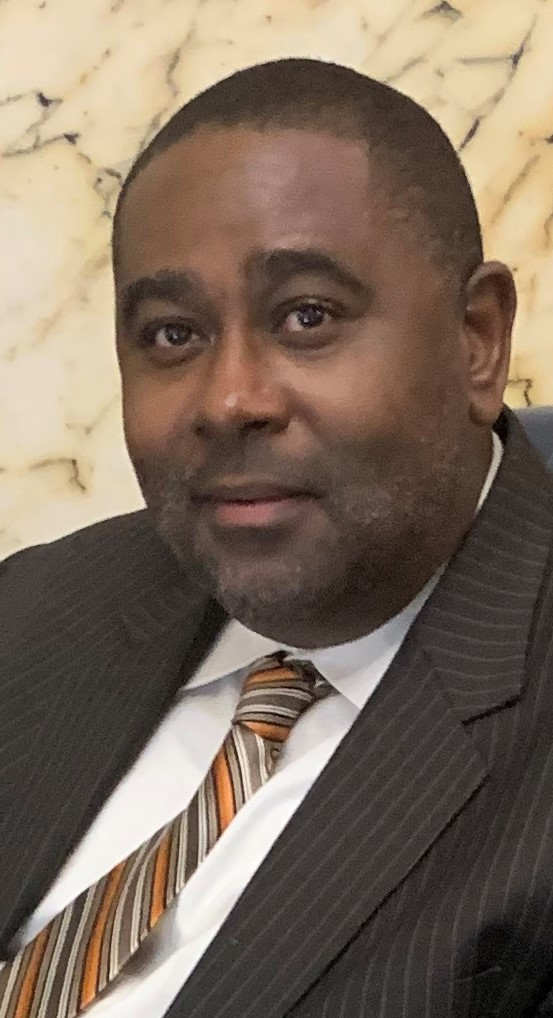

Member of the Maryland House of Delegates from the 25th district
- In office January 14, 2015 – April 15, 2023 Serving with Karen Toles, Angela Angel, Dereck E. Davis, and Nick Charles
- Preceded by: Aisha Braveboy and Melony G. Griffith
- Succeeded by: Kent Roberson

Personal details
- Born: Darryl Lamont Barnes; April 21, 1965 (age 61) Washington, D.C., U.S.
- Party: Democratic
- Children: 2

Darryl Lamont Barnes (born April 21, 1965) is an American politician who was previously a member of the Maryland House of Delegates from 2015 to 2023. Barnes had represented Maryland's 25th District. He served as Deputy Majority Whip from 2017 to 2023, and was the Chair of Legislative Black Caucus of Maryland from 2018 to 2022.

== Early life and career ==
Barnes was born in Washington, D.C., on April 21, 1965. He attended High Point High School in Beltsville, Maryland and graduated from California State University, Long Beach with a degree in computer information systems. He is a small business owner, serving as the President of Barnes International, Ltd. since 2003.

== In the legislature ==
Barnes was sworn into the Maryland House of Delegates on January 14, 2015.

In December 2016, state senator Ulysses Currie announced that he would not seek re-election in the 2018 elections, citing his poor health. Barnes was initially interested in running for the seat, but told the Baltimore Afro-American that he would be seeking re-election in the House of Delegates that year instead.

On April 15, 2023, Barnes resigned from the Maryland House of Delegates to become a partner at the Annapolis lobbying firm Evans, Barnes & Associates.

=== Chair of the Legislative Black Caucus of Maryland ===
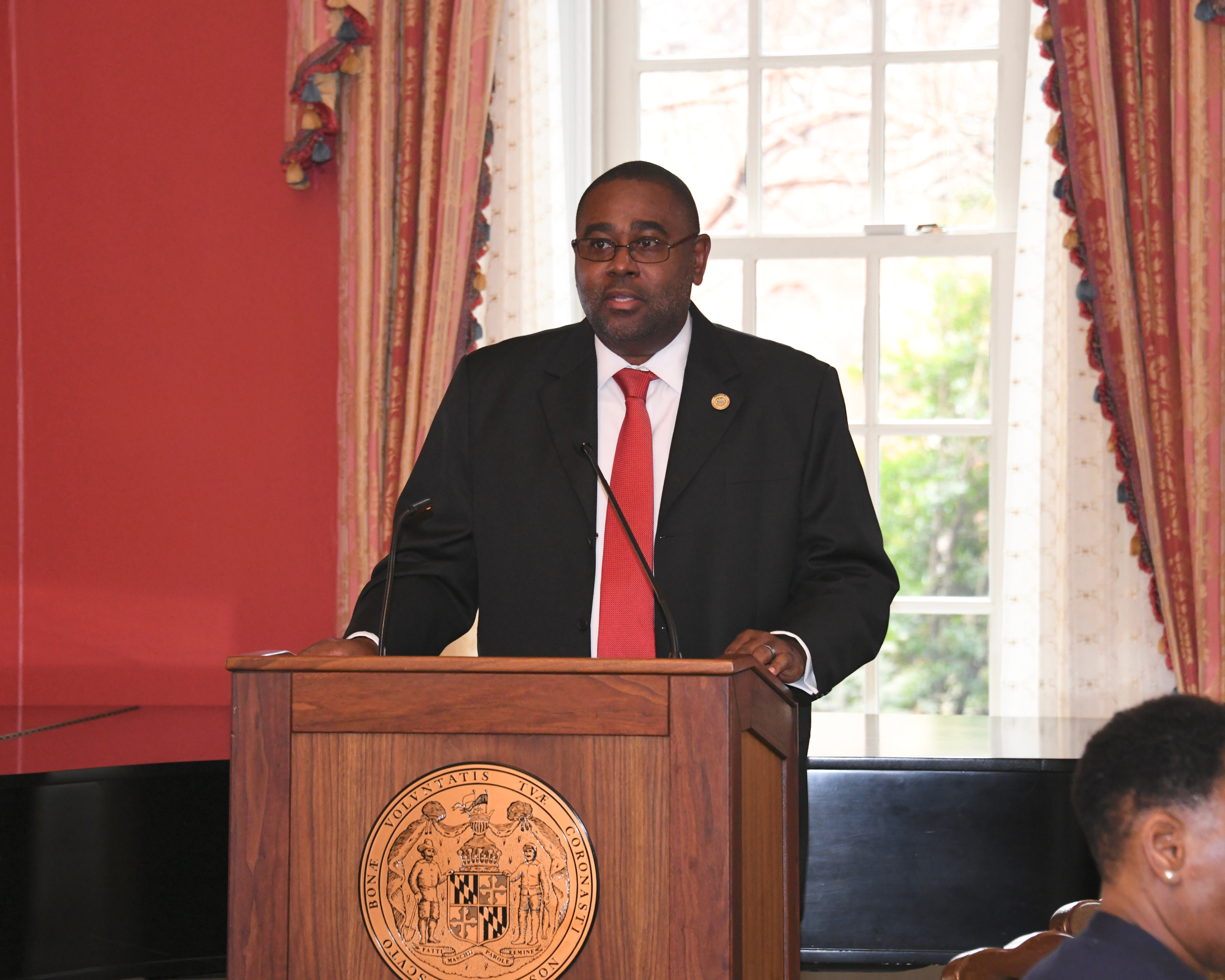
Barnes speaking at a Legislative Black Caucus breakfast in 2019

On March 29, 2018, the Legislative Black Caucus of Maryland voted to elect Barnes as its Chair, making him the first man to lead the caucus in more than a decade. As caucus chairman, Barnes rolled out a long-term policy platform termed the 2030 Maryland Black Agenda, which focused on affordable housing, criminal justice reform, education, health care, and economic justice. In 2019, Barnes stated that "every bill that goes through this year should have the stamp of the Legislative Black Caucus on it."

Ahead of the vote to choose the next Speaker of the Maryland House of Delegates, Barnes organized support behind electing a member of the Legislative Black Caucus to serve as the next Speaker. On April 29, 2019, delegate Regina T. Boyce resigned from the caucus, accusing Barnes of saying, "We are going to let a white lesbian be the speaker of the House?" an apparent reference to Delegate Maggie L. McIntosh, the first openly gay legislator in Maryland history. Barnes said he did not mean to disparage McIntosh, but later asserted he would never use incendiary language about a colleague. Later that day, members of the caucus announced that they had agreed to vote for delegate Dereck E. Davis as the next Speaker. State legislators would end up electing delegate Adrienne A. Jones as the next Speaker of the Maryland House of Delegates on May 1, 2019.

In October 2021, Barnes hosted a gubernatorial forum at the Legislative Black Caucus Reception, where he challenged all attending candidates (Rushern Baker (D), Jon Baron (D), Dan Cox (R), Robin Ficker (R), Peter Franchot (D), Doug Gansler (D), Ashwani Jain (D), John King, Jr. (D), David Lashar (L), Wes Moore (D), Tom Perez (D), and Mike Rosenbaum (D)) to post a Black agenda to their campaign websites by November 1. Candidates who complied with Barnes' challenge include Franchot, Moore, King, and Perez. Barnes later endorsed Franchot's campaign for governor, but switched his endorsement to Moore after he won the Democratic nomination.

On September 27, 2022, Barnes announced that he would step down as chair of the Legislative Black Caucus of Maryland on December 5, 2022. He was succeeded by state delegate Jheanelle Wilkins.

=== Committee assignments ===
- Ways and Means Committee, 2015–present (finance resources subcommittee, 2015–2018; revenues subcommittee, 2015–2018; election law subcommittee, 2017–2018; chair, local revenues subcommittee, 2019–present; member, revenues subcommittee, 2020–present; racing & gaming subcommittee, 2021–present)
- House Cannabis Referendum and Legalization Work Group, 2021–present
- Tax Credit Evaluation Committee, 2017–2021
- Work Group to Address Police Reform and Accountability in Maryland, 2020

=== Other memberships ===
- 2nd Vice-Chair, Prince George's County Delegation, 2018–present (county affairs committee, 2015–2017; vice-chair, 2017–present, & chair, 2018–present, education committee)
- Chair, Legislative Black Caucus of Maryland, 2018–present (parliamentarian, 2015–2016; 1st vice-chair, 2016–2018)
- Maryland Veterans Caucus, 2015–present

== Post-legislative career ==
In July 2025, Prince George's County Executive Aisha Braveboy nominated Barnes as chair of the Prince George's Planning Board. The county council unanimously approved his nomination on July 8, 2025.

In February 2026, Maryland-National Capital Park and Planning Commission chief legal officer Debra Borden filed a complaint against Barnes, alleging that he engaged in misconduct, self-dealing, personal benefit, and procurement interference, and threatened to have Borden fired after she raised legal and ethical concerns about his conduct. Barnes denied the allegations and disputed the "accuracy, completeness, and characterization" of the accounts in the complaint. The commission and Braveboy subsequently opened their own separate investigations into the allegations. After The Baltimore Banner reported on the complaint in May 2026, Braveboy moved to oust Barnes from the planning board. Barnes resigned from the Prince George's County Planning Board on May 16, 2026. In July 2026, Barnes filed a lawsuit against Prince George's County, claiming that he was "compelled to resign" because of pressure from Braveboy and her associates, despite no factual finding of wrongdoing.

== Electoral history ==
Maryland House of Delegates 25th District Democratic Primary Election, 2014
Party	Candidate	Votes	%
Democratic	Dereck E. Davis	9,088	26
Democratic	Angela Angel	7,104	20
Democratic	Darryl Barnes	5,702	16
Democratic	Juanita D. Miller	3,804	11
Democratic	Nick Charles	3,032	9
Democratic	Matthew F. Fogg	1,713	5
Democratic	Tony Jones	1,498	4
Democratic	Geraldine Gerry Eggleston	1,299	4
Democratic	Larry R. Greenfield	1,094	3
Democratic	Stanley Onye	1,014	3

Maryland House of Delegates 25th District General Election, 2014
Party	Candidate	Votes	%
Democratic	Angela Angel	26,792	36
Democratic	Dereck E. Davis	23,593	32
Democratic	Darryl Barnes	23,372	32
Other/Write-in	Other/Write-in	161	0

Maryland House of Delegates 25th District Democratic Primary Election, 2018
Party	Candidate	Votes	%
Democratic	Darryl Barnes	13,050	27
Democratic	Dereck E. Davis	12,152	25
Democratic	Nick Charles	8,330	17
Democratic	Wala Blegay	6,217	13
Democratic	Kent Roberson	3,126	6
Democratic	Sherman R. Hardy	2,200	5
Democratic	Stanley Onye	2,070	4
Democratic	Maurice Culbreath	2,041	4

Maryland House of Delegates 25th District General Election, 2018
Party	Candidate	Votes	%
Democratic	Darryl Barnes	36,845	35
Democratic	Dereck E. Davis	35,229	33
Democratic	Nick Charles	33,411	32
Other/Write-in	Other/Write-in	474	0
