= Kent Roberson =

American politician

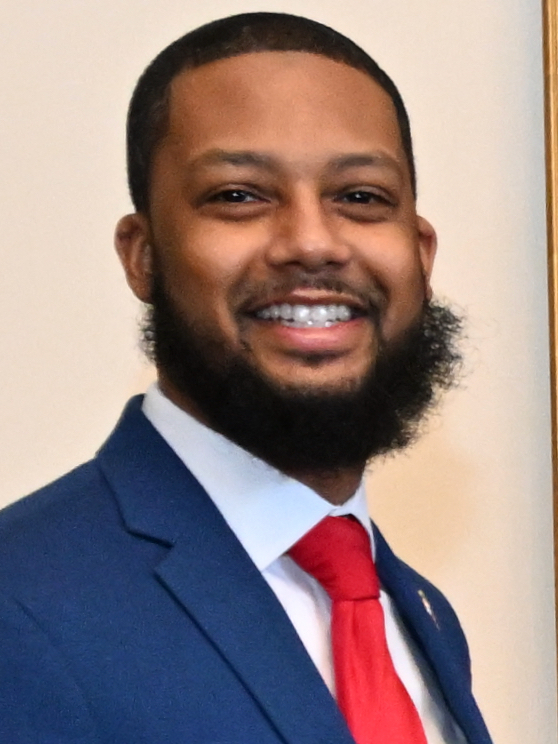
- Roberson in 2024

Member of the Maryland House of Delegates from the 25th district
- Incumbent
- Assumed office May 30, 2023 Serving with Karen Toles and Denise Roberts
- Appointed by: Wes Moore
- Preceded by: Darryl Barnes

Personal details
- Born: Memphis, Tennessee, U.S.
- Party: Democratic
- Children: 3
- Education: Ball State University (BA, MA); Wesley Theological Seminary (MDiv)
- Website: Campaign website

Kent A. Roberson is an American politician who is currently a member of the Maryland House of Delegates from District 25.

== Background ==
Roberson was born in Memphis, Tennessee. He graduated from Frederick Douglass High School and later attended Ball State University, earning a bachelor's and master's degree in political science in 2002 and 2007, and the Wesley Theological Seminary, where he earned a Master of Divinity degree in 2003.

Roberson first got involved in politics during high school in 2002, working as a student page for the Maryland House of Delegates. In 2013, he started work in the Maryland General Assembly mailroom. After graduating, Roberson worked as an intern for U.S. Representative Albert Wynn, later serving as a senior government relations manager for the Corn Refiners Association and the vice president of the Prince George's County Parent Teacher Student Association. In 2021, Roberson was appointed as the African-American Diversity Leadership chair for the state of Maryland.

In 2018, Roberson was elected to the Prince George's County Democratic Central Committee for District 25. He was re-elected to a second term after running unopposed in 2022, subsequently becoming the committee's chair.

Also in 2018, Roberson unsuccessfully ran for the Maryland House of Delegates in District 25, placing fifth with 6.4 percent of the vote. In 2022, Roberson unsuccessfully ran for the Prince George's County Board of Education, losing to small business owner Lolita Walker.

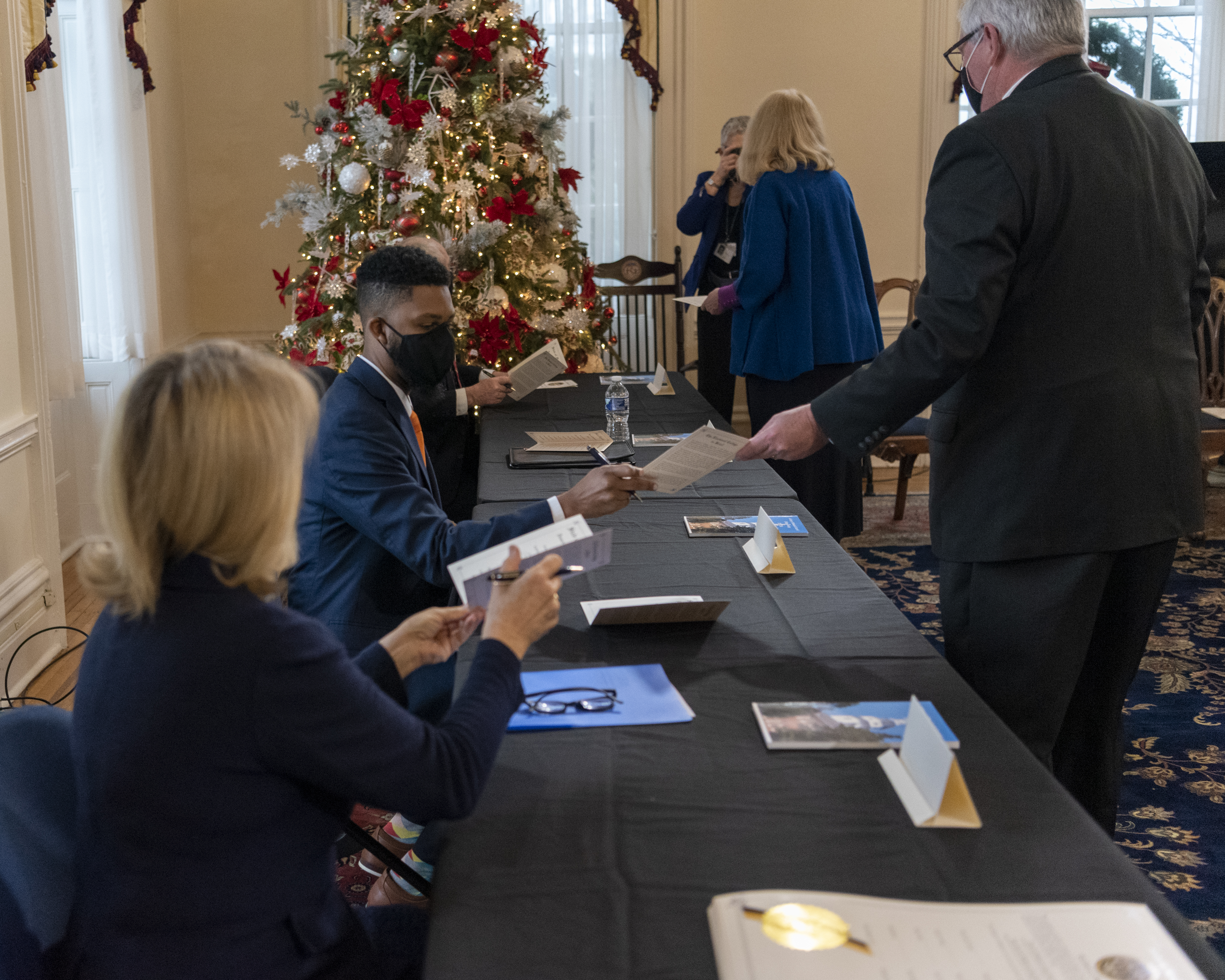
Roberson as a member of the electoral college, 2020

During the 2020 presidential primaries, Roberson unsuccessfully ran for national delegate to the Democratic National Convention, pledged to Elizabeth Warren. He later served as an elector for Maryland's 5th congressional district in the 2020 United States presidential election.

== In the legislature ==
In April 2023, Roberson applied to fill a vacancy left by the resignation of state delegate Darryl Barnes. He was unanimously nominated by fellow members of the Prince George's County Democratic Central Committee on May 5, 2023. Roberson was sworn into office on May 30, 2023. He was a member of the Judiciary Committee from 2023 to 2024, afterwards serving on the Ways and Means Committee until 2027, when he was moved to the Environment and Transportation Committee.

== Personal life ==
Roberson is married to his wife, Jamii. Together, they have three children. Roberson is a social justice minister at the Ebenezer African Methodist Episcopal Church in Fort Washington, Maryland.

== Electoral history ==
Prince George's County Democratic Central Committee District 23 election, 2014
Party	Candidate	Votes	%
Democratic	Cheryl S. Landis (incumbent)	56,024	78.3
Democratic	Kent A. Roberson	15,571	21.7

Maryland House of Delegates District 25 Democratic primary election, 2018
Party	Candidate	Votes	%
Democratic	Darryl Barnes (incumbent)	13,050	26.5
Democratic	Dereck E. Davis (incumbent)	12,152	24.7
Democratic	Nick Charles	8,330	16.9
Democratic	Wala Blegay	6,217	12.6
Democratic	Kent Roberson	3,126	6.4
Democratic	Sherman R. Hardy	2,200	4.5
Democratic	Stanley Onye	2,070	4.2
Democratic	Maurice Culbreath	2,041	4.1

Prince George's County Democratic Central Committee District 25 election, 2018
Party	Candidate	Votes	%
Democratic	Kent Roberson	53,541	51.6
Democratic	Sherma Jack Brisseau	50,272	48.4

Prince George's County Democratic Central Committee District 25 election, 2022
Party	Candidate	Votes	%
Democratic	Kent Roberson (incumbent)	100,319	100.0

Prince George's County Board of Education District 9 election, 2022
Candidate	Votes	%
Lolita Walker	17,861	56.8
Kent Roberson	13,390	42.6
Write-in	213	0.7
