= Nick Charles (politician) =

American politician (born 1982)

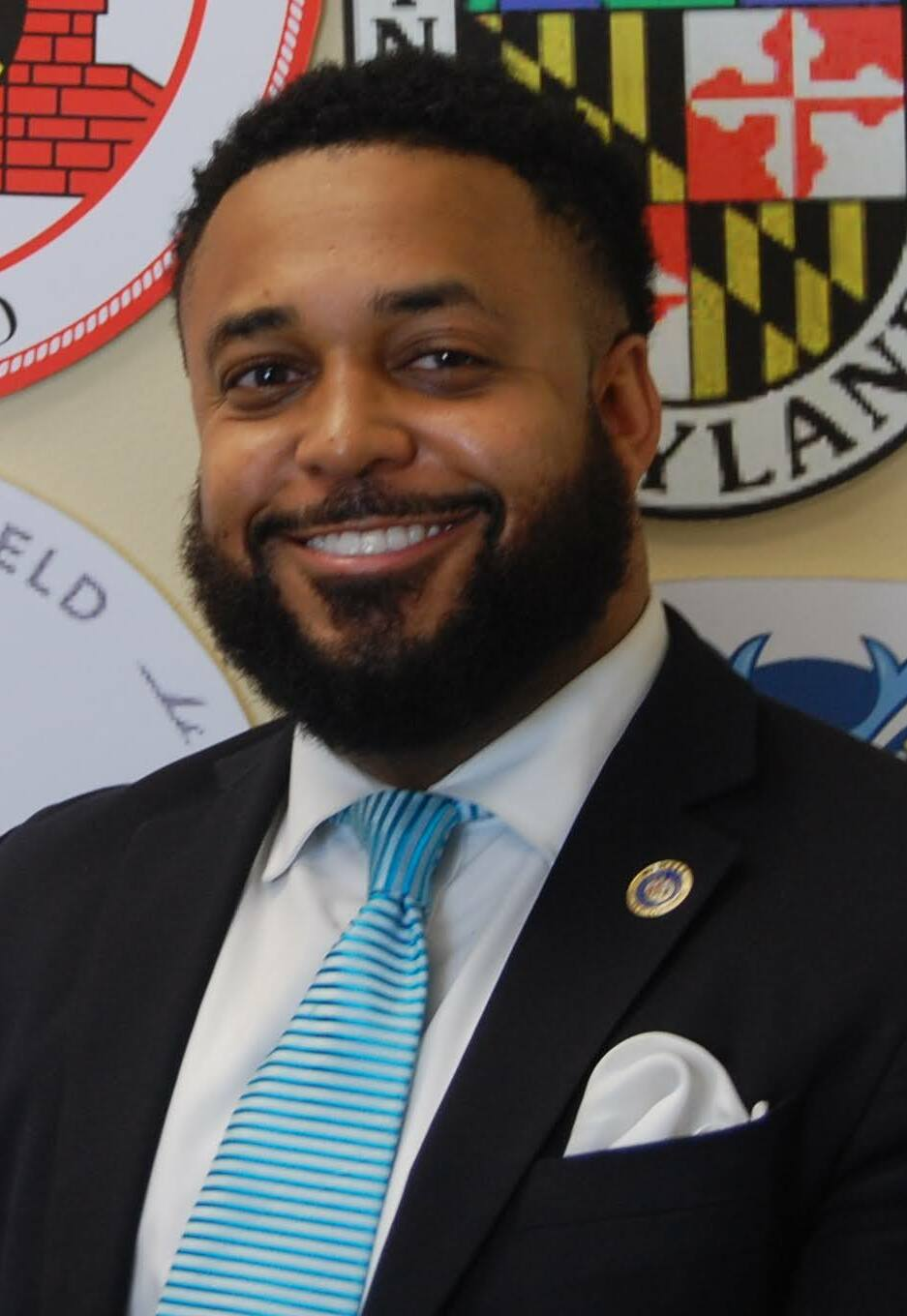

Member of the Maryland Senate from the 25th district
- Incumbent
- Assumed office December 5, 2023
- Appointed by: Wes Moore
- Preceded by: Melony G. Griffith

Member of the Maryland House of Delegates from the 25th district
- In office January 9, 2019 – December 5, 2023
- Preceded by: Angela Angel
- Succeeded by: Denise Roberts

Personal details
- Born: Nicholas Patrick Charles II; December 16, 1982 (age 43) Washington, D.C., U.S.
- Party: Democratic
- Children: 2
- Education: Community College of the Air Force (AA); University of the District of Columbia (BBA)
- Profession: Federal acquisition consultant

Military service
- Branch/service: United States Air Force
- Years of service: 2001–2006
- Unit: 60th Fighter Squadron; 422d Test and Evaluation Squadron; District of Columbia National Guard
- Battles/wars: Operation Noble Eagle
- Awards: (2) Achievement Medal

Nicholas Patrick Charles II (born December 16, 1982) is an American politician who has served as a member of the Maryland Senate representing District 25 since 2023. He previously represented the district in the Maryland House of Delegates from 2019 to 2023.

== Early life and education ==
Charles was born in Washington, D.C. and grew up in Prince George's County, Maryland, and graduated from Largo High School. He served in the 60th Fighter Squadron and the 422d Test and Evaluation Squadron of the U.S. Air Force from 2001 to 2006, afterwards attending Community College of the Air Force, where he earned an associate degree in aviation management, and the University of the District of Columbia, where he earned a Bachelor of Arts degree in business administration, both in 2009.

== Career ==
After serving in the military, Charles worked as a defense contractor for the U.S. Navy. In 2015, he started his own consulting company.

In 2014, Charles unsuccessfully ran for the Maryland House of Delegates in District 25, placing fifth in the Democratic primary. He ran again in 2018, during which he ran on a slate with incumbents Dereck E. Davis and Darryl Barnes. Charles placed third in the Democratic primary and general elections.

=== Maryland General Assembly ===
Charles was sworn into the Maryland House of Delegates on January 9, 2019. He served as a member of the Health and Government Operations Committee until 2021, afterwards serving in the Ways and Means Committee. Following the appointment of Erek Barron to serve as U.S. Attorney for the District of Maryland, Charles was unanimously elected as the chair of the Prince George's County Delegation.

In October 2023, after state senator Melony G. Griffith announced that she would resign at the end of the month, Charles announced that he would apply to serve the remainder of Griffith's term in the Maryland Senate. He was the only candidate to apply for the seat and in November, he was unanimously nominated by the Prince George's County Democratic Central Committee to the seat. Charles was appointed to the seat by Governor Wes Moore and sworn in on December 5.

== Political positions ==
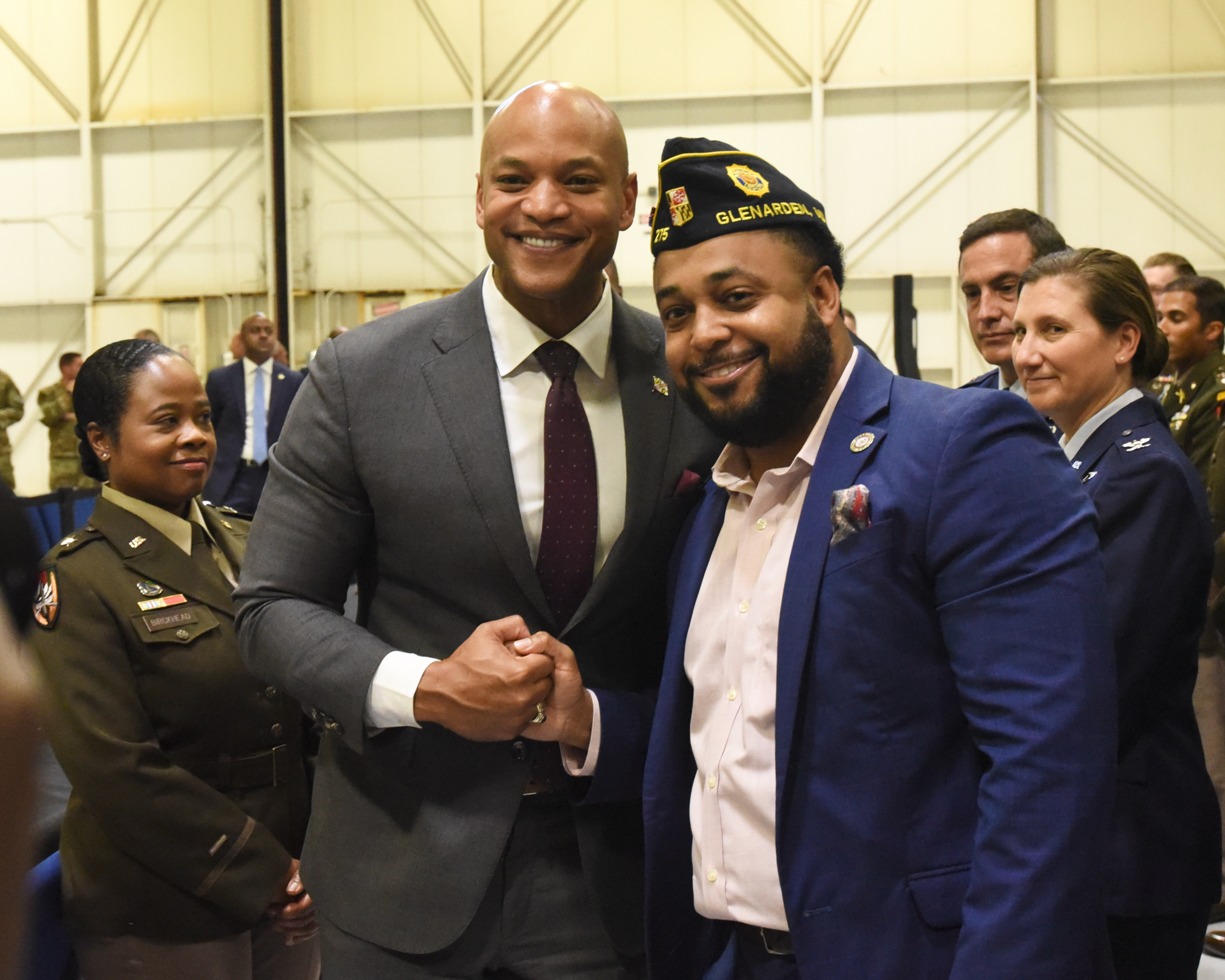
Charles with Governor Wes Moore, 2023

=== COVID-19 pandemic ===
During the 2021 legislative session, Charles introduced a bill that would prohibit employers from firing workers who refused to get the COVID-19 vaccine.

=== Housing ===
In February 2015, Charles called real estate appraisers "part of the problem" when referring to a foreclosure and housing crisis in Prince George's County. During his 2018 House of Delegates campaign, he said he supported legislation to reform the real estate appraisal process. In 2023, Charles introduced a bill to provide low-income homeowners with a right to counsel in foreclosures.

=== Policing ===
During the 2020 legislative session, Charles introduced a bill that would allow people targeted by false police calls to sue callers for damages.

=== Redistricting ===
In November 2025, Charles said he would feel comfortable voting for a bill to redraw Maryland's congressional districts in response to Republican mid-decade redistricting efforts in various red states, but added that he was also weighing the fact that legal challenges against a new map could allow Republicans to gain one to two House seats in Maryland.

=== Social issues ===
During the 2022 legislative session, Charles introduced a bill that would ban discrimination against students and guardians in education.

== Personal life ==
After serving in the military, Charles bought a home in Forestville, Maryland. He is a congregant at the Freedom Way Missionary Baptist Church in Capitol Heights, Maryland.

Charles' personal military awards include two Air Force Achievement Medals.

== Electoral history ==
Maryland House of Delegates District 25 Democratic primary election, 2014
Party	Candidate	Votes	%
Democratic	Dereck E. Davis (incumbent)	9,088	25.7
Democratic	Angela Angel	7,104	20.1
Democratic	Darryl Barnes	5,702	16.1
Democratic	Juanita D. Miller	3,804	10.8
Democratic	Nick Charles	3,032	8.6
Democratic	Matthew F. Fogg	1,713	4.8
Democratic	Tony Jones	1,498	4.2
Democratic	Geraldine Gerry Eggleston	1,299	3.7
Democratic	Larry R. Greenhill	1,094	3.1
Democratic	Stanley Onye	1,014	2.9

Maryland House of Delegates District 25 Democratic primary election, 2018
Party	Candidate	Votes	%
Democratic	Darryl Barnes (incumbent)	13,050	26.5
Democratic	Dereck E. Davis (incumbent)	12,152	24.7
Democratic	Nick Charles	8,330	16.9
Democratic	Wala Blegay	6,217	12.6
Democratic	Kent Roberson	3,126	6.4
Democratic	Sherman R. Hardy	2,200	4.5
Democratic	Stanley Onye	2,070	4.2
Democratic	Maurice Culbreath	2,041	4.1

Maryland House of Delegates District 25 election, 2018
Party	Candidate	Votes	%
Democratic	Darryl Barnes (incumbent)	36,845	34.8
Democratic	Dereck E. Davis (incumbent)	35,229	33.2
Democratic	Nick Charles	33,411	31.5
Write-in		474	0.4

Maryland House of Delegates District 25 election, 2018
Party	Candidate	Votes	%
Democratic	Darryl Barnes (incumbent)	36,845	34.8
Democratic	Dereck E. Davis (incumbent)	35,229	33.2
Democratic	Nick Charles	33,411	31.5
Write-in		474	0.4

Maryland House of Delegates District 25 election, 2022
Party	Candidate	Votes	%
Democratic	Darryl Barnes (incumbent)	31,906	34.4
Democratic	Karen Toles (incumbent)	30,886	33.3
Democratic	Nick Charles (incumbent)	29,519	31.9
Write-in		356	0.4
