= Dereck E. Davis =

American politician (born 1967)

Dereck Davis
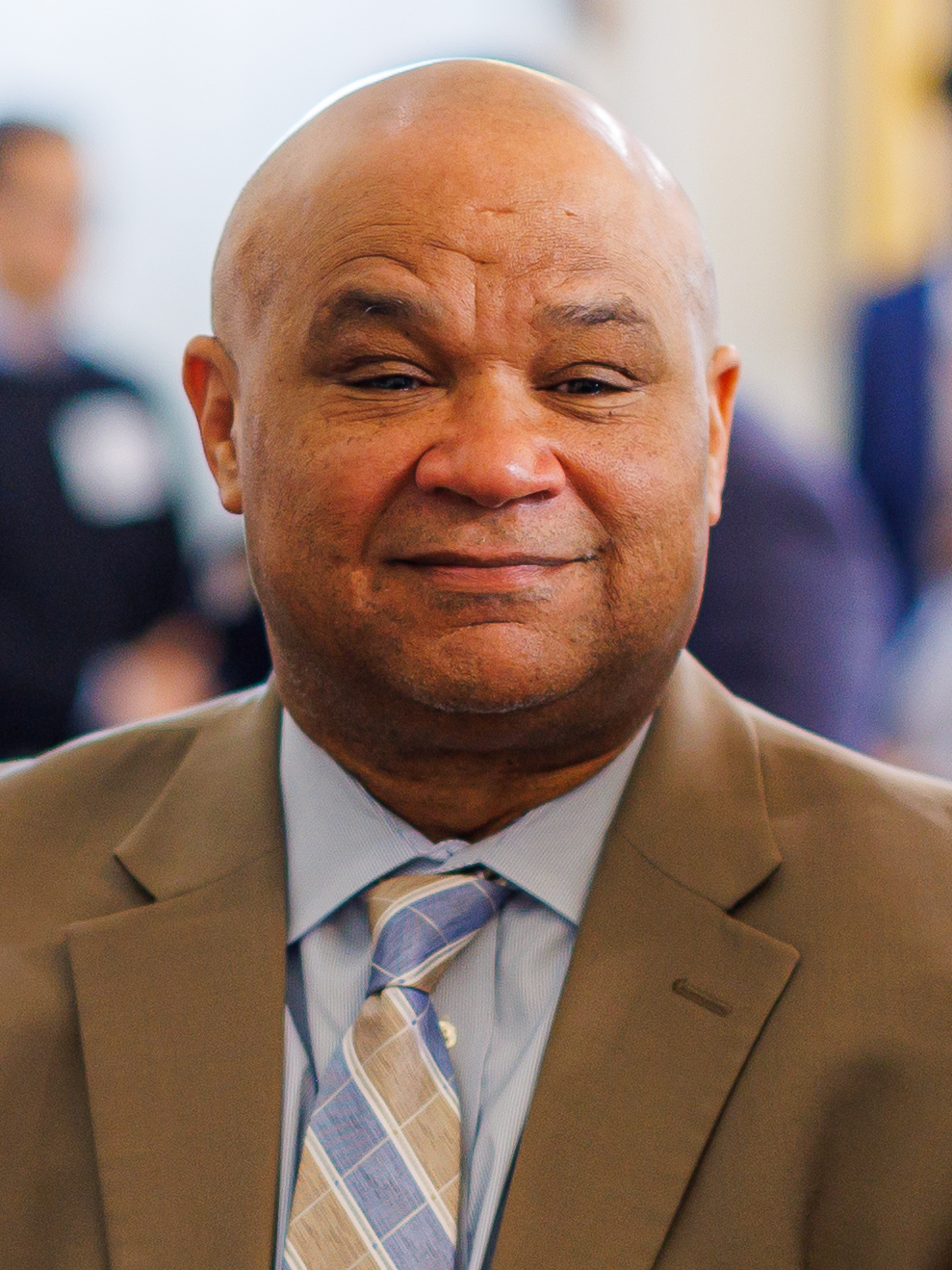
- Davis in 2025

24th Treasurer of Maryland
- Incumbent
- Assumed office December 17, 2021
- Governor: Larry Hogan; Wes Moore
- Preceded by: Nancy Kopp

Member of the Maryland House of Delegates from the 25th district
- In office January 11, 1995 – December 17, 2021
- Preceded by: Michael Arrington
- Succeeded by: Karen Toles

Personal details
- Born: Dereck Eugene Davis; June 6, 1967 (age 59) Washington, D.C., U.S.
- Party: Democratic
- Spouse: Monique Whittington Davis
- Children: 2
- Education: University of Maryland, College Park (BA, MPP)

Dereck Eugene Davis (born June 6, 1967) is an American politician serving as the Treasurer of Maryland since 2021. A member of the Democratic Party, he previously served as a member of the Maryland House of Delegates from the 25th district from 1995 to 2021.

== Early life and education ==
Davis was born in Washington, D.C. on June 6, 1967. After graduating from Central High School, he attended the University of Maryland, College Park, where he earned a Bachelor of Arts degree in 1989 and his Masters of Public Policy in 1999.

== Career ==
Davis worked as an aide to the Prince George's County Council from 1988 to 1994, first as a constituent services aide and later as a legislative aide. In 1993, he was a member of the Prince George's County Nuisance Abatement Task Force. Davis was an administrator of the Washington Suburban Sanitary Commission from 2004 to 2011, and deputy director of the Prince George's County Office of Community Relations from 2011 to 2021.

=== Maryland House of Delegates ===
Davis was elected to the Maryland House of Delegates in 1994 and sworn in on January 11, 1995. He was a member of the Environmental Matters Committee from 1995 to 2003, afterwards serving as the chair of the Economic Matters Committee until 2021. Davis was the fourth African American to chair a House standing committee in Maryland and the first from Prince George's County. He was also the chair of the Prince George's County Delegation from 2003 to 2005, 2013 to 2014, and from 2017 to 2021; and a member of the Legislative Black Caucus of Maryland.

The Washington Post has described Davis as a centrist and an ally of Prince George's County Executive Rushern Baker. He voted in favor of electric deregulation in 1999, but later called this vote a mistake. During his tenure as the chair of the Economic Matters Committee, he was involved in negotiations to avert a 72 percent rate increase in Baltimore Gas and Electric utility costs, which led into a special legislative session after legislators failed to pass a bill during the regular 2006 legislative session and eventually led to a bill that would temporarily cap rate increases to 15 percent and replace the five-member Maryland Public Service Commission with regulators selected by the legislature. The bill passed and became law after the Maryland General Assembly voted to override Governor Bob Ehrlich's veto of the bill.

Davis supported bills to raise the minimum wage, ban smoking in bars and restaurants, repeal the ban on developer contributions to Prince George's County candidates, and many of Governor Martin O'Malley's legislative priorities. He also defended Maryland's 2010 congressional redistricting plan from criticism from the Legislative Black Caucus of Maryland, saying that Democrats should focus on electing more progressives to the U.S. House of Representatives instead of making elections for incumbents "as easy as possible", and opposed bills to legalize same-sex marriage in Maryland and offer medical aid in dying to terminally-ill patients.

In September 2008, Davis was questioned by the Federal Bureau of Investigation in its investigation into whether state senator Ulysses Currie, who worked as a consultant for Shoppers Food & Pharmacy, used his position to push for bills that would benefit the grocery store chain. Davis testified before a grand jury in the Currie probe in May 2009, during which he spoke on an amendment introduced by Currie during the 2005 legislative session to transfer a beer-and-wine license from a Shopper's store in Takoma Park to one in College Park. Currie and two Shopper's executives were charged with extortion and bribery charges, but were acquitted after a six-week trial in 2011, after which Davis ran on a slate with Currie in 2014.

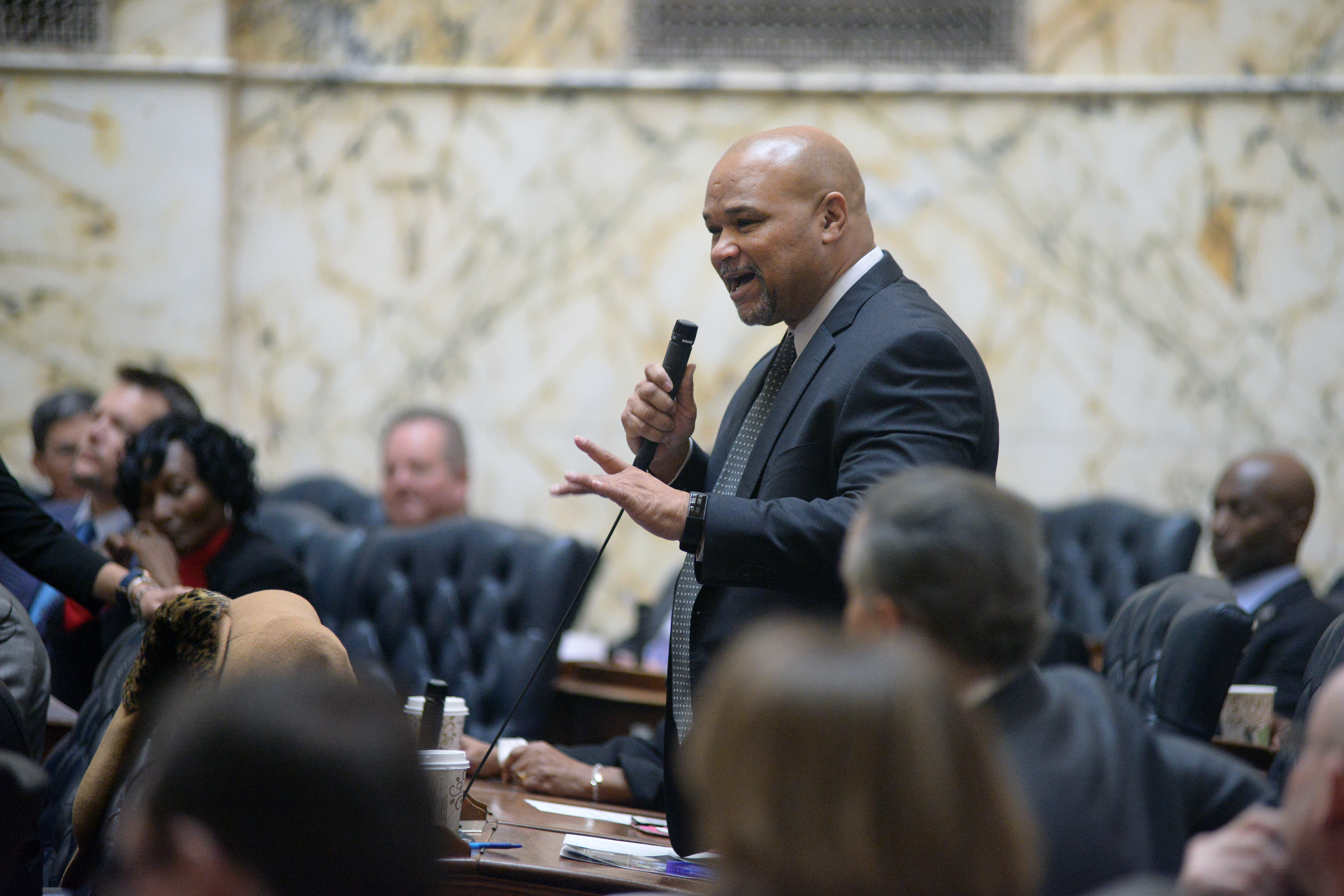
Davis in the Maryland House of Delegates, 2020

In April 2019, Following the funeral of House Speaker Michael E. Busch, Davis announced that he would run for Speaker of the Maryland House of Delegates. His candidacy was backed by Prince George's County Executive Angela Alsobrooks, the Legislative Black Caucus of Maryland, and House Republican Caucus. He was also backed by Adrienne A. Jones, who also declared her candidacy for Speaker but dropped out of the race after failing to capture enough support. On May 1, 2019, Davis and Maggie McIntosh, who was competing with Davis in the Speaker election, both agreed to withdraw from the race and back Jones after a four-hour, closed-door Democratic caucus meeting on the day of the election. Davis would have been the first African-American Speaker of the Maryland House of Delegates.

=== 2016 House of Representatives election campaign ===
On April 15, 2015, after U.S. representative Donna Edwards announced that she would run for U.S. Senate in 2016, Davis announced that he would run for the U.S. House of Representatives in Maryland's 4th congressional district. During the Democratic primary, he received endorsements from more than a dozen members of the Maryland General Assembly and county councilmember Derrick Leon Davis, and raised about $464,000 in campaign contributions. Davis dropped out of the race on February 2, 2016, to focus on the legislative session.

=== Treasurer of Maryland ===
In October 2021, Davis confirmed he would run for state treasurer following the retirement of Nancy Kopp. The Maryland General Assembly elected Davis as the next state treasurer on December 9, 2021. He was sworn in on December 17, becoming the first state treasurer from Prince George’s County, and the second African-American to hold the position, after Richard N. Dixon. During his tenure, Davis has placed additional scrutiny onto contracts with inadequate participation from historically disadvantaged business owners and raised concerns about settlements involving law enforcement agencies or correctional officers.

In December 2022, administrators of Maryland's 529 college savings plan discovered a calculation error affecting all 31,000 prepaid accounts, which led to the Maryland Prepaid College Trust suspending interest payments and preventing families from accessing their prepaid plans. After being re-elected as treasurer in February 2023, Davis asked legislators to move the 529 program into the treasurer's office, which led to legislative leaders introducing a bill to do so. The bill passed and was signed into law by Governor Wes Moore on April 24, 2023. In July 2023, the treasurer's office restored interest earned to the same rates account owners held under their previous contract and that all balances or contributions made after July 2024 would not earn interest.

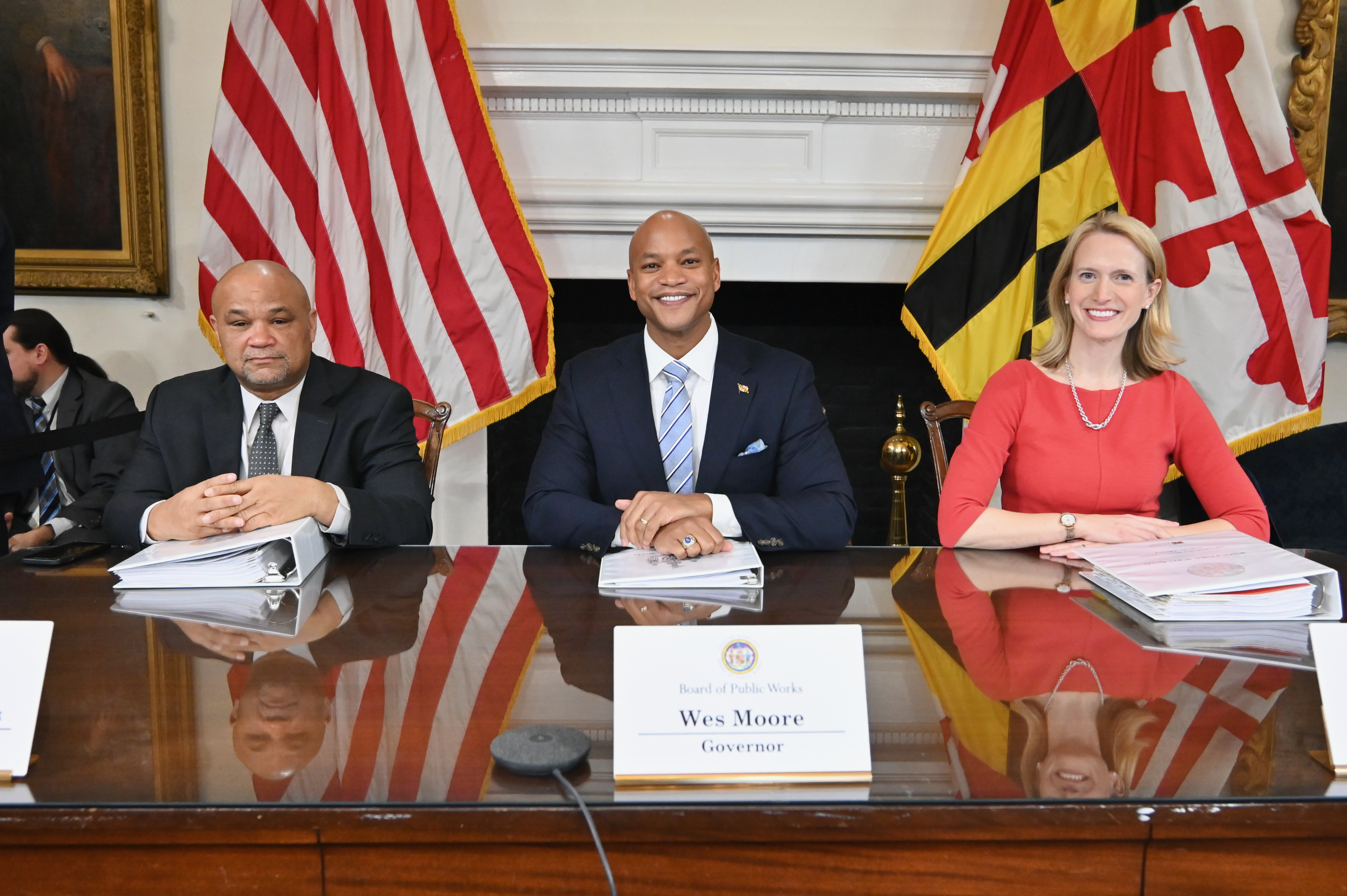
Davis (left) on the Maryland Board of Public Works, 2023

In June 2023, Maryland Matters reported that Davis was continuing to raise funds for his campaign account as state treasurer, which he said was to stay "prepared" for the future and that he had no plans to leave his position. He continued to raise funds during the 2024 legislative session, during which he supported a bill that would add the state treasurer to the list of state officials that were prohibited from raising campaign funds while the legislature was in session. The bill passed and was signed into law by Governor Moore.

Davis was an at-large delegate to the 2024 Democratic National Convention, pledged to Kamala Harris.

In May 2025, Moody's Ratings downgraded Maryland's creditworthiness level from AAA to Aa1, saying that while Maryland had addressed its budget problems "through a combination of tax increases and restraints on expenditures", the state was economically and fiscally underperforming other states with an AAA bond rating. Moody's report also predicted that Maryland would continue to underperform economically due to the state's "heightened vulnerability to shifting federal policies and employment, and its elevated fixed costs". Following this, Davis criticized Moody's and implied that the state may no longer need their services, saying that the bond agency wasn't "the standard-bearer they once were". In May 2026, Maryland ended its relationship with Moody's, replacing it with the Kroll Bond Rating Agency (KBRA), which gave the state a AAA rating in January 2026. Davis defended this decision, saying that the state had a toxic relationship with Moody's and that hiring KBRA would cost the state roughly one-third of what it paid Moody's.

In July 2026, Davis expressed concerns with the state's plans to acquire Laurel Park and the intellectual property rights of the Preakness Stakes, worrying that the push to prop up horse racing in Maryland was driven by nostalgia and that the state was not looking at the "opportunity cost" associated with the purchase. Nevertheless, Davis voted in favor of the Laurel Park acquisition.

== Personal life ==
Davis is married to Monique Whittington Davis, who served as deputy superintendent of Prince George's County Public Schools from 2013 to 2018. Together, they have a son and a daughter.

== Electoral history ==
Maryland House of Delegates District 25 Democratic primary election, 1994
Party	Candidate	Votes	%
Democratic	Brenda Bethea Hughes (incumbent)	6,619	22.8
Democratic	Dereck E. Davis	5,985	20.6
Democratic	Michael A. Crumlin	4,263	14.7
Democratic	Marva Jo Camp	3,101	10.7
Democratic	Sharrarne Morton	2,724	9.4
Democratic	Mary L. Brown	2,544	8.8
Democratic	Melony G. Griffith	1,887	6.5
Democratic	Norton N. Bonaparte Jr.	891	3.1
Democratic	Marvin L. Doxie Sr.	658	2.3
Democratic	Sean Eric Short	347	1.2

Maryland House of Delegates District 25 election, 1994
Party	Candidate	Votes	%
Democratic	Brenda Bethea Hughes (incumbent)	14,728	33.8
Democratic	Dereck E. Davis	14,509	33.3
Democratic	Michael A. Crumlin	14,281	32.8

Maryland House of Delegates District 25 election, 1998
Party	Candidate	Votes	%
Democratic	Anthony G. Brown	20,660	33.6
Democratic	Melony G. Griffith	20,595	33.5
Democratic	Dereck E. Davis (incumbent)	20,262	32.9

Maryland House of Delegates District 25 election, 2002
Party	Candidate	Votes	%
Democratic	Anthony G. Brown (incumbent)	21,350	34.9
Democratic	Melony G. Griffith (incumbent)	20,163	33.0
Democratic	Dereck E. Davis (incumbent)	19,585	32.0
Write-in		69	0.1

Maryland House of Delegates District 25 election, 2006
Party	Candidate	Votes	%
Democratic	Aisha Braveboy	22,632	32.6
Democratic	Melony G. Griffith (incumbent)	21,584	31.1
Democratic	Dereck E. Davis (incumbent)	21,540	31.1
Republican	Patrick A. Schaeffer Jr.	2,541	3.7
Green	David Kiasi	999	1.4
Write-in		62	0.1

Maryland House of Delegates District 25 election, 2010
Party	Candidate	Votes	%
Democratic	Aisha Braveboy (incumbent)	27,804	35.3
Democratic	Dereck E. Davis (incumbent)	25,723	32.6
Democratic	Melony G. Griffith (incumbent)	25,095	31.8
Write-in		173	0.2

Maryland House of Delegates District 25 election, 2014
Party	Candidate	Votes	%
Democratic	Angela Angel	26,792	36.2
Democratic	Dereck E. Davis (incumbent)	23,593	31.9
Democratic	Darryl Barnes	23,372	31.6
Write-in		161	0.2

Maryland House of Delegates District 25 election, 2018
Party	Candidate	Votes	%
Democratic	Darryl Barnes (incumbent)	36,845	34.8
Democratic	Dereck E. Davis (incumbent)	35,229	33.2
Democratic	Nick Charles	33,411	31.5
Write-in		474	0.4

Political offices
Preceded by Nancy Kopp	Treasurer of Maryland; 2021–present	Incumbent
