= James Yates (jurist) =

James A. Yates is an American lawyer and former judge from New York. He had been appointed general counsel to the Governor of New York, David Paterson, in 2008, but Yates ultimately decided to remain a judge instead. The appointment had come as a surprise, as the two are not close associates.

He earned an A.B. from Princeton University in 1967 and a J.D. from Rutgers Law School in 1973. Yates began his career as an attorney with the Legal Aid Society in New York City in 1973, and was one of the founders of the New York State Association of Criminal Defense Lawyers, an organization whose mission is to "ensure justice and due process for persons accused of crimes or other misconduct." He went on to serve as counsel to the New York State Assembly Majority Leader from 1987 to 1989, and to the Speaker of the Assembly from 1989 to 1992. Yates taught as an adjunct professor on the faculty of the New York Law School from 1997 to 2004, the New York University School of Law from 1989 to 1993, the Queens College City University of New York School of Law from 1986 to 1991, the Cardozo School of Law from 1985 to 1986, and the Pace University School of Law in 1984.

In 1992, Yates was appointed to the New York Court of Claims by Governor Mario Cuomo, and served until 1998, when he was elected to a fourteen-year term to the state's highest trial court, the New York State Supreme Court, in New York County. On the bench, Yates was known as a liberal, and former New York City prosecutor Daniel Alonso noted that his "appointment may signal Governor Paterson's intention to adopt a progressive criminal justice agenda." In January 2011, he was once again appointed Counsel to the Speaker of the New York State Assembly by Speaker Sheldon Silver. He was asked to stay on by the following speaker, Carl Heastie, and retired in 2015.

== Bibliography ==
- Yates, James. New York Pre-Trial Criminal Practice. West Publishing: New York, 1996.
