= Melony G. Griffith =

American politician (born 1963)

Melony Griffith
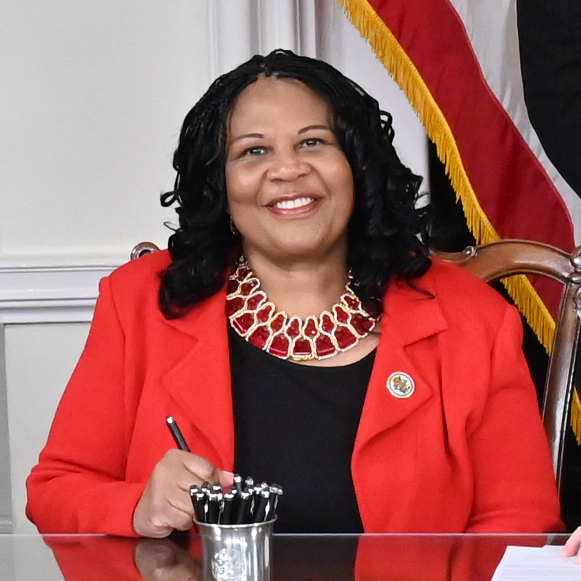
- Griffith in 2022

President pro tempore of the Maryland Senate
- In office January 8, 2020 – January 11, 2023
- Preceded by: Kathy Klausmeier
- Succeeded by: Malcolm Augustine

Member of the Maryland Senate from the 25th district
- In office January 9, 2019 – October 31, 2023
- Preceded by: Ulysses Currie
- Succeeded by: Nick Charles

Member of the Maryland House of Delegates from the 25th district
- In office January 13, 1999 – January 14, 2015
- Preceded by: Michael Crumlin
- Succeeded by: Darryl Barnes

Personal details
- Born: Melony Ghee; June 5, 1963 (age 63) Abilene, Texas, U.S.
- Party: Democratic
- Children: 2
- Education: Montana State University, Billings (BS); Howard University (MSW)

Melony Ghee Griffith (born June 5, 1963) is an American politician who was a member of the Maryland Senate representing District 25 in Prince George's County from 2019 until her resignation on October 31, 2023. She previously served as president pro tempore of the Maryland Senate from 2020 to 2023, and as a member of the Maryland House of Delegates from 1999 to 2015.

== Early life and education ==
Melony Ghee was born on June 5, 1963, in Abilene, Texas, to father Frank F. Ghee Jr., and mother Mary E. Ghee. She grew up as a military brat in Montana and graduated from Charles M. Russell High School. She later attended Eastern Montana College, where she earned her Bachelor of Science degree in psychology, criminology and rehabilitation in 1985. In 1987, she graduated from Howard University with a Master of Social Work degree.

== Career ==
After graduating from Howard, Griffith worked as a clinical social worker. From 1992 to 1993, she worked as a project coordinator for the National Basketball Players Association's Health Education Project at the Johns Hopkins University. She later served as a senior program officer for the Academy for Educational Development from 1998 to 2004, afterwards working in various positions for the Prince George's County Health Department until 2009.

Griffith first got involved in politics in 1996, running as a write-in candidate for the Prince George's County Board of Education in District 7.

=== Maryland House of Delegates ===
Griffith was sworn into the Maryland House of Delegates on January 13, 1999. She was a member of the Judiciary Committee until 2002, afterwards serving on the Appropriations Committee until she left the legislature in 2015. During her tenure, Griffith gained a reputation as a policy wonk, especially in health care policy.

In 2000, Griffith served as a delegate to the Democratic National Convention, pledged to Al Gore.

=== Maryland Senate ===
==== Elections ====
2014

On October 15, 2013, Griffith announced that she would run for the Maryland Senate in District 25, challenging incumbent state senator Ulysses Currie. Currie was seen as a vulnerable candidate following his federal corruption trial, in which he was acquitted after arguing that his conducts violated Senate ethics rules rather than federal laws, and subsequent censure.

The Democratic primary was seen as the most competitive election in the district since Currie's election in 1994, with the Prince George's County establishment backing Currie and area newspapers backing Griffith. Griffith ran on a platform focusing on economic development, jobs, education, and public safety, and ran a "nice" campaign against Currie, whom she considered a friend, by not mentioning his corruption charges to voters. Currie enjoyed a significant fundraising advantage over Griffith, having almost three times the cash on hand as her.

Griffith was defeated by Currie in the Democratic primary in June 2014, receiving 37.7 percent of the vote to Currie's 58.7 percent.

2018

In November 2016, after state senator Ulysses Currie announced he would resign from the Maryland Senate, Griffith applied to serve the remainder of his term in the Maryland Senate. However, Currie rescinded his resignation later in the month a few days before it was sent to go into effect, citing the "political fighting" over the selection of his replacement.

In June 2017, after Currie announced that he would not seek re-election in 2018, Griffith announced that she would again run for the Maryland Senate in District 25. She received support from the Prince George's County establishment in her run against state delegate Angela Angel, whom she defeated in the Democratic primary with 55 percent of the vote.

==== Tenure ====
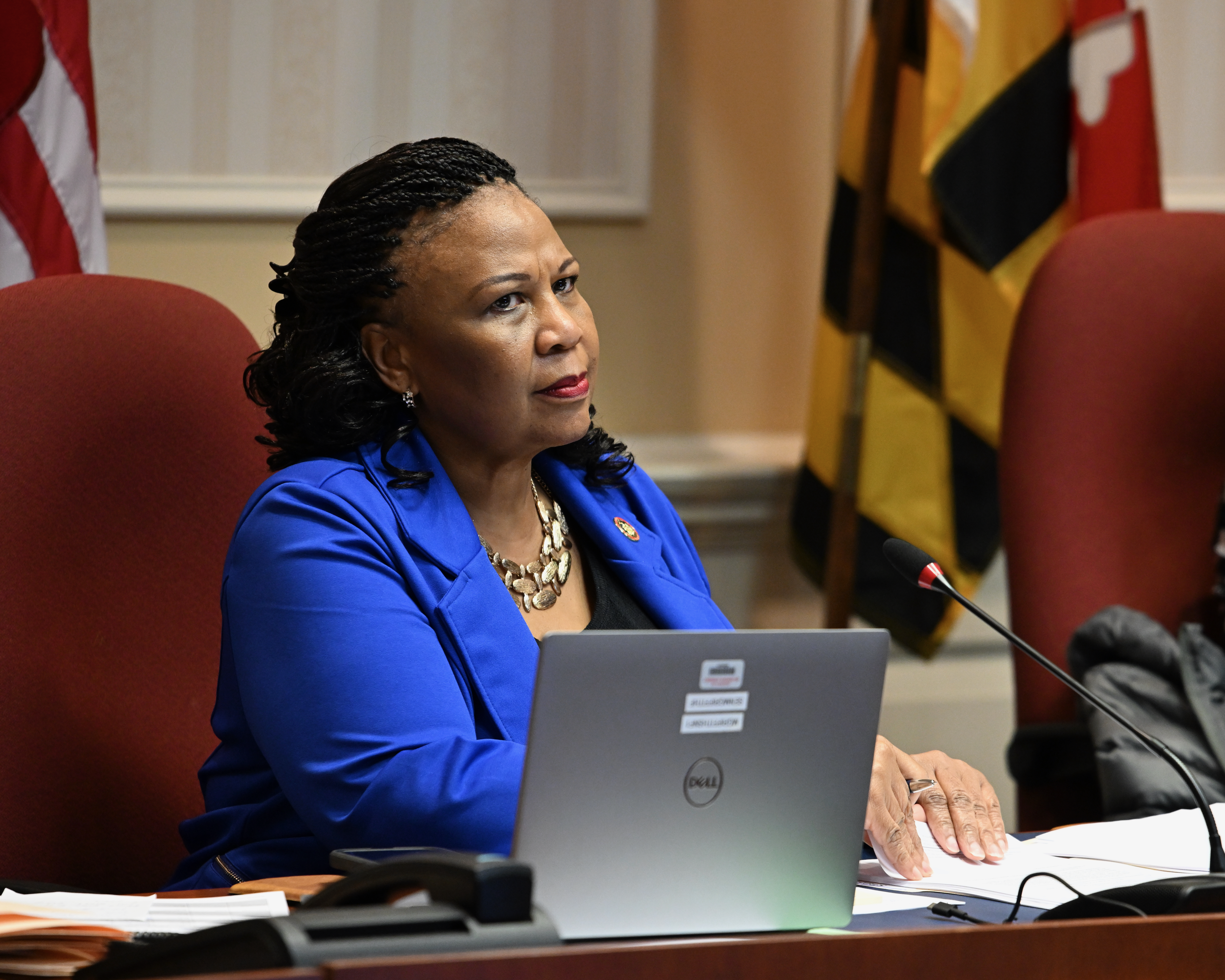
Griffith served as the chair of the Finance Committee in 2023.

Griffith was sworn into the Maryland Senate on January 9, 2019. She was a member of the Budget and Taxation Committee from 2019 to 2022, afterwards serving as the chair of the Finance Committee.

In January 2020, Griffith was elected by the Maryland Senate to serve as president pro tempore, making her the first African American woman to have the role. She stepped down as president pro tempore in 2023.

During the 2020 Democratic Party presidential primaries, Griffith supported Joe Biden and served as a co-chair of the Maryland Women for Biden group, alongside Adrienne A. Jones, Angela Alsobrooks, and Yvette Lewis.

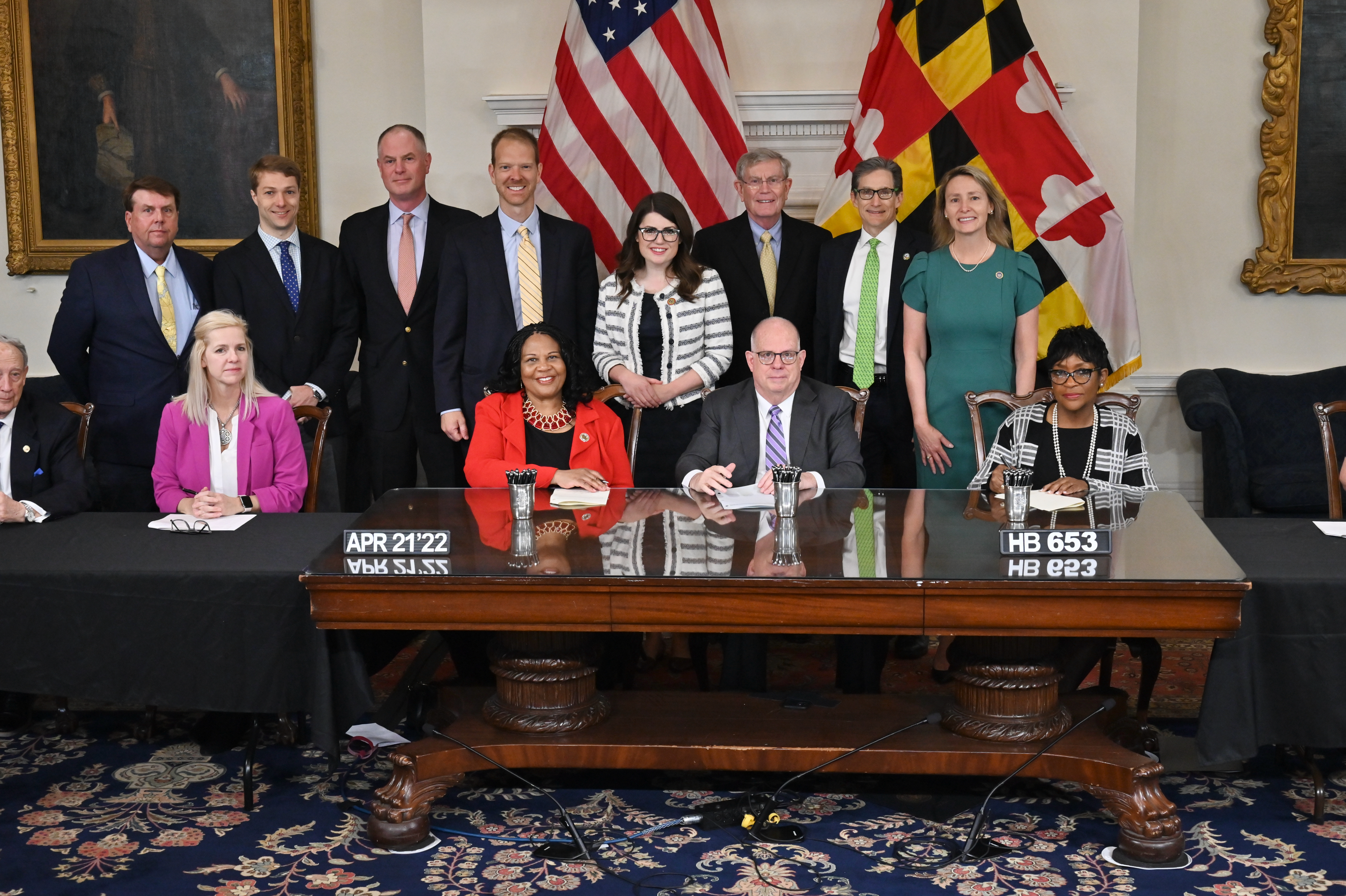
Griffith, Governor Larry Hogan and House Speaker Adrienne A. Jones enacting law in 2022

In April 2022, Griffith signed 103 Maryland measures into law together with Republican Governor Larry Hogan and House Speaker Adrienne A. Jones. It was the first time that two Black women had taken part in such a ceremony as Maryland's presiding officers. Jones represented the house while Griffith as the President pro tem represented the Maryland Senate.

On October 6, 2023, Griffith announced that she would resign from the Maryland Senate at the end of the month to become the head of the Maryland Hospital Association. She is the organization's fifth president, as well as the first African American woman to hold the position.

== Political positions ==
=== Healthcare ===
Griffith chaired a work group to develop House Speaker Adrienne A. Jones' "Black agenda", which included proposals to extend Medicaid coverage for pregnant women until 12 months postpartum.

During the 2023 legislative session, Griffith said she supported a bill to allow non-citizens to enroll in health insurance programs, calling it a "first good step".

=== Minimum wage ===
During the 2023 legislative session, during a committee hearing on the Fair Wage Act, a bill that would have raised the minimum wage to $15 an hour by October 2023 and indexed future increases to inflation, Griffith supported an amendment to the bill delaying the increase to 2024 and removing provisions indexing it to inflation.

=== Redistricting ===
In October 2011, ahead of the special legislative session to redraw Maryland's congressional districts, Griffith expressed disappointment with the failed Legislative Black Caucus of Maryland pressure campaign toward Governor Martin O'Malley to draw a map that considered "specific issued raised by the caucus".

=== Social issues ===
In 2001, Griffith voted for a bill to ban discrimination on the basis of sexual orientation. During the 2006 legislative session, she voted against overturning a committee decision to kill a proposed constitutional amendment to ban same-sex marriage in Maryland. In December 2011, Griffith said she opposed the Civil Marriage Protection Act, a bill to legalize same-sex marriage in Maryland.

During the 2007 legislative session, Griffith voted for a bill creating a referendum to legalize slot machine gambling in Maryland. In February 2012, she said she opposed a plan to build a casino in National Harbor, Maryland, noting that Prince George's County voted against slots in the 2008 referendum and saying that she preferred "other forms" of economic development for the county.

== Personal life ==
Griffith has two children and has lived in Suitland, Maryland since 2002.

In May 1999, Jeb Bello, a maître d'hôtel at the Treaty of Paris restaurant in Annapolis, Maryland, filed a lawsuit against Griffith, asking for $3.1 million in damages and alleging that she defamed him by portraying him as "a bigot and a racist" for seating a white couple before her and a Black companion, which culminated into a campaign that prevented him from finding another job in Annapolis. The case was settled out of court in January 2001.

== Electoral history ==
Maryland House of Delegates District 25 Democratic primary election, 1998
Party	Candidate	Votes	%
Democratic	Dereck E. Davis (incumbent)	4,782	22.0
Democratic	Melony G. Griffith	4,757	21.9
Democratic	Anthony G. Brown	4,346	20.0
Democratic	Marva Jo Camp	4,191	19.3
Democratic	Brenda B. Hughes (incumbent)	3,102	14.3
Democratic	Cheyenne R. Watson	521	2.4

Maryland House of Delegates District 25 election, 1998
Party	Candidate	Votes	%
Democratic	Anthony G. Brown	20,660	33.6
Democratic	Melony G. Griffith	20,595	33.5
Democratic	Dereck E. Davis (incumbent)	20,262	32.9

Maryland House of Delegates District 25 election, 2002
Party	Candidate	Votes	%
Democratic	Anthony G. Brown (incumbent)	21,350	34.9
Democratic	Melony G. Griffith (incumbent)	20,163	33.0
Democratic	Dereck E. Davis (incumbent)	19,585	32.0
Write-in		69	0.1

Maryland House of Delegates District 25 election, 2006
Party	Candidate	Votes	%
Democratic	Aisha Braveboy	22,632	32.6
Democratic	Melony G. Griffith (incumbent)	21,584	31.1
Democratic	Dereck E. Davis (incumbent)	21,540	31.1
Republican	Patrick A. Schaeffer Jr.	2,541	3.7
Green	David Kiasi	999	1.4
Write-in		62	0.1

Maryland House of Delegates District 25 election, 2010
Party	Candidate	Votes	%
Democratic	Aisha Braveboy (incumbent)	27,804	35.3
Democratic	Dereck E. Davis (incumbent)	25,723	32.6
Democratic	Melony G. Griffith (incumbent)	25,095	31.8
Write-in		173	0.2

Maryland Senate District 25 election, 2014
Party	Candidate	Votes	%
Democratic	Ulysses Currie (incumbent)	8,173	58.7
Democratic	Melony G. Griffith	5,253	37.7
Democratic	Terry Goolsby	503	3.6

Maryland Senate District 25 Democratic primary election, 2018
Party	Candidate	Votes	%
Democratic	Melony Griffith	10,939	55.0
Democratic	Angela Angel	7,320	36.8
Democratic	Jonathan Edward Rosero	1,641	8.2

Maryland Senate District 25 election, 2018
Party	Candidate	Votes	%
Democratic	Melony Griffith	44,390	99.4
Write-in		253	0.6

Maryland Senate District 25 election, 2022
Party	Candidate	Votes	%
Democratic	Melony Griffith (incumbent)	35,953	99.4
Write-in		200	0.6

Maryland Senate
Preceded by Kathy Klausmeier	President pro tempore of the Maryland Senate; 2020–2023	Succeeded by Malcolm Augustine
