= Maryland Legislative District 25 =

American legislative district

Maryland's legislative district 25
- Represents part of Prince George's County
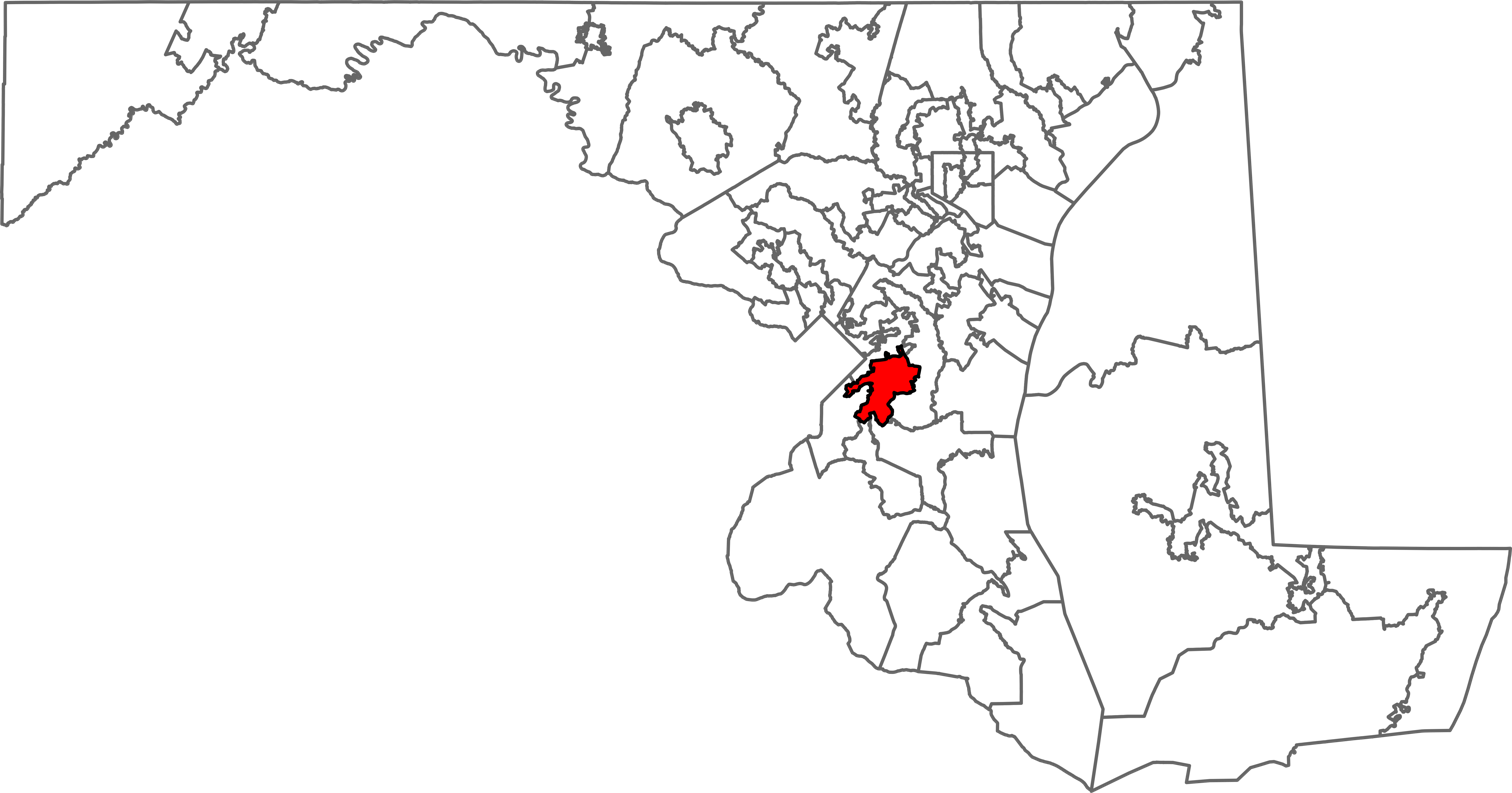
- Senator: Nick Charles (D)
- Delegate(s): Karen Toles (D); Kent Roberson (D); Denise Roberts (D)
- Registration: 84.7% Democratic; 3.6% Republican; 9.9% unaffiliated
- Demographics: 5.3% White; 81.8% Black/African American; 0.5% Native American; 1.5% Asian; 0.0% Hawaiian/Pacific Islander; 6.0% Other race; 4.9% Two or more races; 9.1% Hispanic
- Population (2020): 125,974
- Voting-age population: 98,881
- Registered voters: 90,179

Maryland Legislative District 25 is one of 47 districts in the state for the Maryland General Assembly. It covers part of Prince George's County. The district is represented by three delegates in the Maryland House of Delegates.

== Demographic characteristics ==
As of the 2020 United States census, the district had a population of 125,974, of whom 98,881 (78.5%) were of voting age. The racial makeup of the district was 6,635 (5.3%) White, 103,109 (81.8%) African American, 572 (0.5%) Native American, 1,878 (1.5%) Asian, 13 (0.0%) Pacific Islander, 7,548 (6.0%) from some other race, and 6,188 (4.9%) from two or more races. Hispanic or Latino of any race were 11,485 (9.1%) of the population.

The district had 90,179 registered voters as of October 17, 2020, of whom 8,920 (9.9%) were registered as unaffiliated, 3,213 (3.6%) were registered as Republicans, 76,365 (84.7%) were registered as Democrats, and 1,408 (1.6%) were registered to other parties.

== Political representation ==
The district is represented for the 2023–2027 legislative term in the State Senate by Nick Charles (D) and in the House of Delegates by Karen Toles (D), Kent Roberson (D), and Denise Roberts (D).

== Election history ==
Years	Senator	Party	Electoral history
January 8, 1975 – January 12, 1983	Tommie Broadwater	Democratic	Elected in 1974. Re-elected in 1978. Redistricted to the 24th district.
January 12, 1983 – January 14, 1987	B. W. Mike Donovan	Democratic	Elected in 1982. Retired.
January 14, 1987 – January 4, 1993	Albert Wynn	Democratic	Elected in 1986. Re-elected in 1990. Resigned.
January 12, 1993 – January 11, 1995	Beatrice Tignor	Democratic	Appointed to serve the remainder of Wynn's term. Retired to run for Prince George's County executive.
January 11, 1995 – January 9, 2019	Ulysses Currie	Democratic	Elected in 1994. Re-elected in 1998. Re-elected in 2002. Re-elected in 2006. Re-elected in 2010. Re-elected in 2014. Retired.
January 9, 2019 – October 31, 2023	Melony G. Griffith	Democratic	Elected in 2018. Re-elected in 2022. Resigned.
December 5, 2023 – present	Nick Charles	Democratic	Appointed to serve the remainder of Griffith's term. Elected in 2026.
