= Ulysses Currie =

American politician (1937–2019)

Member of the Maryland Senate from the 25th district
- In office January 11, 1995 – January 9, 2019
- Preceded by: Beatrice Tignor
- Succeeded by: Melony G. Griffith

Member of the Maryland House of Delegates from the 25th district
- In office January 1987 – January 11, 1995 Serving with Dennis C. Donaldson, Juanita Miller (1987–1991); Michael Arrington, Beatrice Tignor (1991–1995)
- Succeeded by: Michael A. Crumlin, Dereck E. Davis, Brenda Bethea Hughes

Personal details
- Born: Ulysses Currie; July 10, 1937 Whiteville, North Carolina, U.S.
- Died: December 27, 2019 (aged 84)
- Party: Democratic
- Spouse: Married
- Children: 2
- Occupation: Teacher

Ulysses Currie (July 10, 1937 – December 27, 2019) was an American politician from Maryland. A member of the Democratic Party, he represented District 25 in Prince George's County, first in the house of delegates from 1987 to 1995, then in the senate from 1995 to 2019. Currie was the Chair of the Budget and Taxation Committee before having to resign the chairmanship because of an ethics violation.

== Background ==
Currie, the son of a sharecropper, grew up in Whiteville, North Carolina. He was the first of his family to go to college and earned his undergraduate degree from North Carolina Agricultural and Technical State University. He served in the United States Army from 1960 to 1963, and was stationed at Fort Dix and in Germany. After serving in the army, he moved to the Washington metropolitan area to attend American University. Currie worked for 25 years as an educator in Prince George's County Public Schools.

== In the legislature ==
Currie was originally elected to the House of Delegates in 1986, representing District 25 in Prince George's County. During his time in the house, he became Majority Whip, the 3rd-ranking position in the House after the Speaker and the Majority Leader. Currie was elected to his seat in the State Senate in 1994. He was a member of the Budget and Taxation Committee.

== FBI investigation ==
On May 29, 2008, it was reported that the FBI had searched Currie's District Heights home and taken documents related to his work as a consultant to Shoppers Food & Pharmacy. On September 1, 2010, a federal grand jury indicted Currie and Shoppers Food Warehouse Corporation executives William J. White and R. Kevin Small in connection with a scheme from 2002 to 2008 in which the supermarket chain allegedly paid Senator Currie in exchange for using his official position and influence in matters benefitting White, Small, and the supermarket chain. Currie was acquitted on November 8, 2011. However, in 2012 he was censured by the state senate for ethics violations from facts discovered during the investigation, and was forced to resign from the chairmanship of the Budget and Taxation Committee.

== Later years and death ==
On June 1, 2018, Maryland's Head Start Program was renamed the Ulysses Currie Head Start Program to honor Senator Currie.

Currie died early on December 27, 2019. He was 84.
