= Karen Toles =

American politician

Karen R. Toles
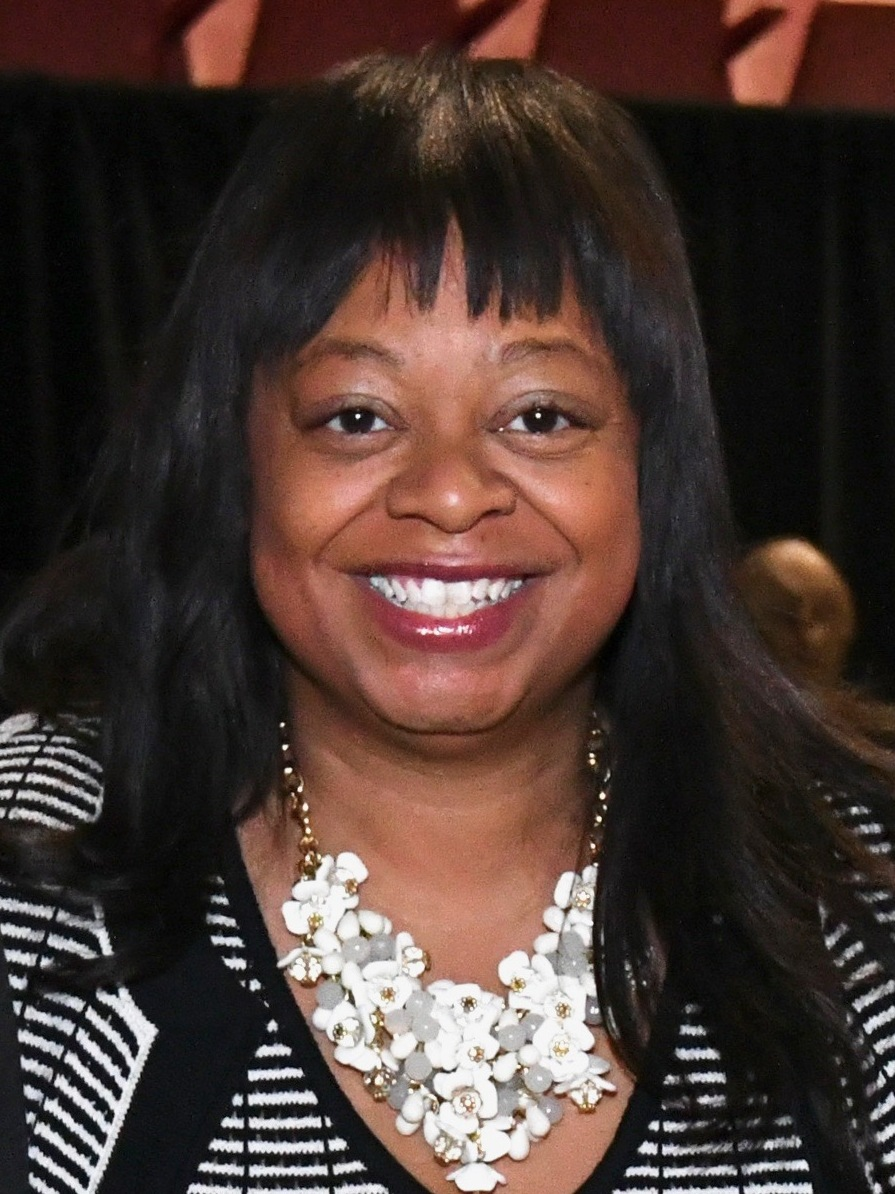

Member of the Maryland House of Delegates from the 25th district
- Incumbent
- Assumed office January 12, 2022 Serving with Kent Roberson and Denise Roberts
- Appointed by: Larry Hogan
- Preceded by: Dereck E. Davis

Prince George's County Council District 7
- In office December 6, 2010 – December 3, 2018
- Preceded by: Camille Exum
- Succeeded by: Rodney Colvin Streeter

Personal details
- Born: Prince George's County, Maryland, U.S.
- Party: Democratic
- Education: University of Maryland, College Park (B.S.); University of Baltimore Law School (J.D.)

Karen Renee Toles is an American Democratic politician from Maryland. Following the resignation of State Delegate Dereck E. Davis to serve as the Treasurer of Maryland, Governor Larry Hogan appointed her to serve the remainder of his term. Since 2022, she has served in the Maryland House of Delegates, representing district 25, based in Prince George's County.

== Early life ==
Toles was born in Prince George's County, Maryland and attended Forestville High School in Forestville, Maryland. She graduated from the University of Maryland, College Park in 2000, earning a B.S. degree in public health. She has also earned a J.D. degree from the University of Baltimore Law School.

== Career ==
Toles has worked as a political and legislative consultant on various organizations, including the American Federation of State, County and Municipal Employees (AFSCME) and United Mine Workers of America (UMWA) labor unions, and for Prince George's County State's Attorney Aisha N. Braveboy. She has also operated her own policy consulting business, Paramount Policy Partners, since 2019.

Toles entered politics in 2008, working as a regional field coordinator for the Democratic National Committee until 2010. She was elected to represent District 7 of the Prince George's County Council in 2010, a position she held until 2018.

In 2012, Toles was charged with reckless driving after traveling in a county-owned vehicle at a speed of 105 miles per hour on the Capital Beltway. Toles apologized for the incident, saying that she would voluntarily enroll in a driver improvement class and discontinue her use of county-owned vehicles. Anne Arundel District Court Judge Megan Johnson gave Toles probation before judgment in relation to the charge.

In January 2022, the Prince George's Democratic Central Committee unanimously voted to elect Toles to serve in the Maryland House of Delegates, filling a vacancy left by the resignation of former delegate Dereck E. Davis. Governor Larry Hogan officially appointed her to the House of Delegates on January 11, 2022, and she was sworn in the next day.

== In the legislature ==
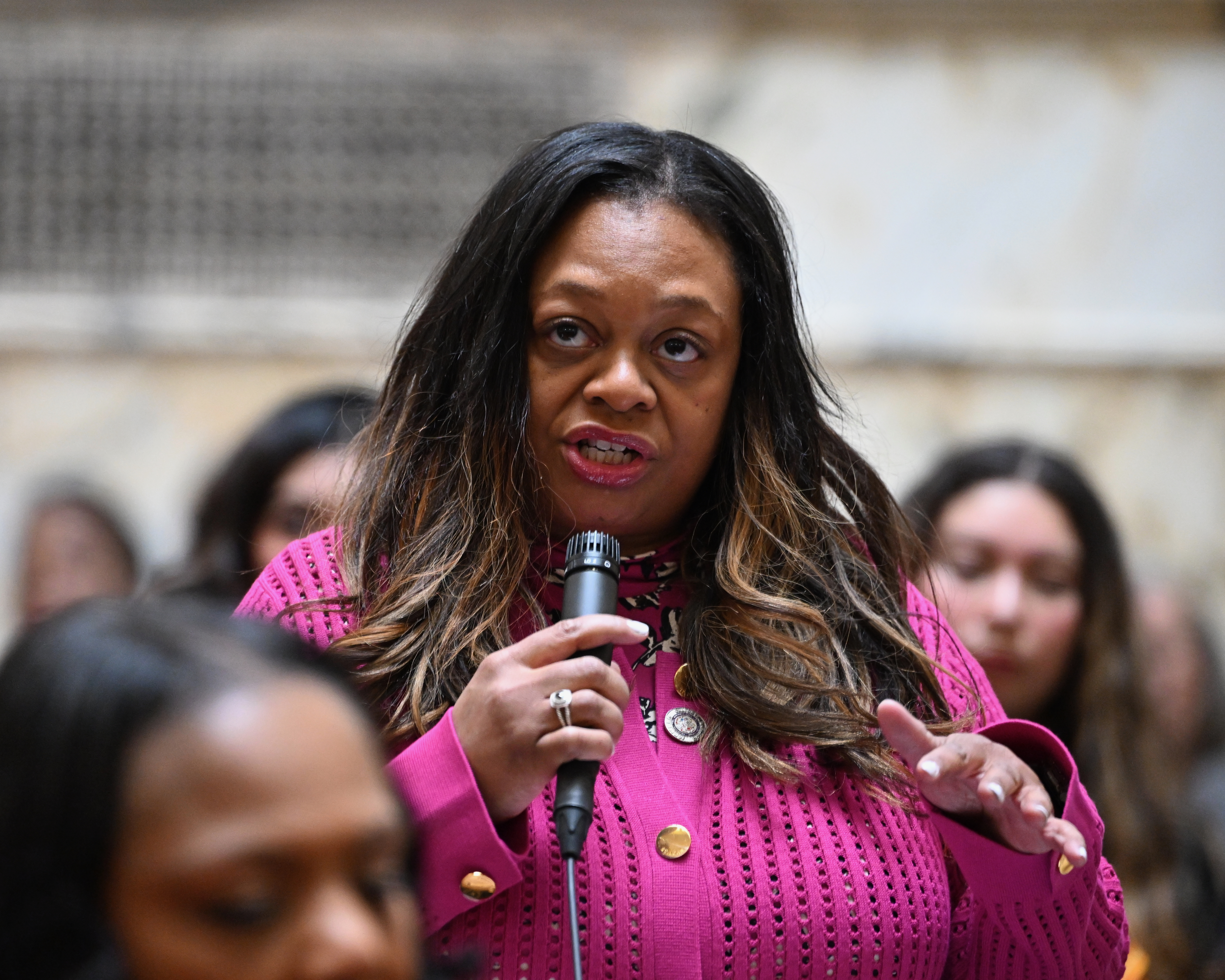
Toles in the Maryland House of Delegates, 2025

Toles was sworn into the Maryland House of Delegates on January 12, 2022. She was elected to a full term in the 2022 general election.

=== Other memberships ===
- Legislative Black Caucus of Maryland, 2022–present
- Women Legislators of Maryland, 2022–present

== Personal life ==
Toles attends religious services at the Episcopal Church of the Atonement in Washington, D.C.

== Electoral history ==
Prince George's County Council District 7 Democratic Primary Election, 2010
Party	Candidate	Votes	%
Democratic	Karen Toles	3,238	41
Democratic	Angela Childs	1,720	22
Democratic	Eugene W. Grant	1,130	14
Democratic	Darrell A. Miller	921	12
Democratic	Natasha Shamone-Gilmore	549	7
Democratic	Charles H. Thomas, III	333	4

Prince George's County Council District 7 General Election, 2010
Party	Candidate	Votes	%
Democratic	Karen Toles	19,477	100
Other/Write-in	Other/Write-in	42	0

Prince George's County Council District 7 Democratic Primary Election, 2014
Party	Candidate	Votes	%
Democratic	Karen Toles	5,273	68
Democratic	Bruce Branch	1,525	20
Democratic	Kito James	757	10
Democratic	G. Falls	191	3

Prince George's County Council District 7 General Election, 2014
Party	Candidate	Votes	%
Democratic	Karen Toles	17,912	99
Other/Write-in	Other/Write-in	108	1

Prince George's County Council At Large Democratic Primary Election, 2018
Party	Candidate	Votes	%
Democratic	Mel Franklin	43,270	21
Democratic	Calvin Hawkins	39,182	19
Democratic	Karen Toles	36,463	17
Democratic	Juanita Culbreath-Miller	31,010	15
Democratic	Gerron Levi	25,665	12
Democratic	Julian Lopez	15,717	8
Democratic	Melvin Bernard Johnson	9,790	5
Democratic	Jonathan White	4,802	2
Democratic	Reginald J. Tyer	4,366	2
