= 2026 United States House of Representatives elections in Maryland =

- November 3, 2026

All 8 Maryland seats to the United States House of Representatives
	Majority party	Minority party
Party	Democratic	Republican
Last election	7	1
Seats won	7	1
Seat change	Steady	Steady
Popular vote	1,741,049	738,800
Percentage	69.37%	29.44%
Swing	▲5.89%	▼5.23%

Democratic
40–50%
50–60%
60–70%
70–80%
80–90%
90–100%
Republican
50–60%
60–70%
70–80%

The 2026 United States House of Representatives elections in Maryland were held on November 3, 2026, to elect the eight U.S. representatives from the state of Maryland, one from each of the state's eight congressional districts. The elections coincided with other elections to the House of Representatives and various state and local elections. The primary elections took place on June 23, 2026.

== Failed redistricting attempt ==
In November 2025, as a part of the broader 2025–2026 United States redistricting, Governor Wes Moore announced the formation of the Governor's Redistricting Advisory Commission, which was tasked with holding public hearings and providing recommendations for a new congressional map. On January 20, 2026, the commission voted to recommend a congressional map that would redraw Maryland's 1st congressional district to improve the Democratic Party's chances of winning it. The map passed the Maryland House of Delegates by a 99–37 vote on February 2, 2026, but died in the Maryland Senate after Senate President Bill Ferguson refused to hold a vote on the redistricting bill in the Senate. In August 2026, the Maryland General Assembly convened for a special session, during which it passed Question 3, which would exempt Maryland's congressional districts from guidelines in the Constitution of Maryland that require legislative districts to respect natural boundaries and the boundaries of political subdivisions. If approved by voters, it may allow Democrats to redraw its congressional maps ahead of the 2028 elections. Voters approved Question 3 on November 3, 2026, with approximately 60% of the vote.

== District 1 ==
2026 Maryland's 1st congressional district election
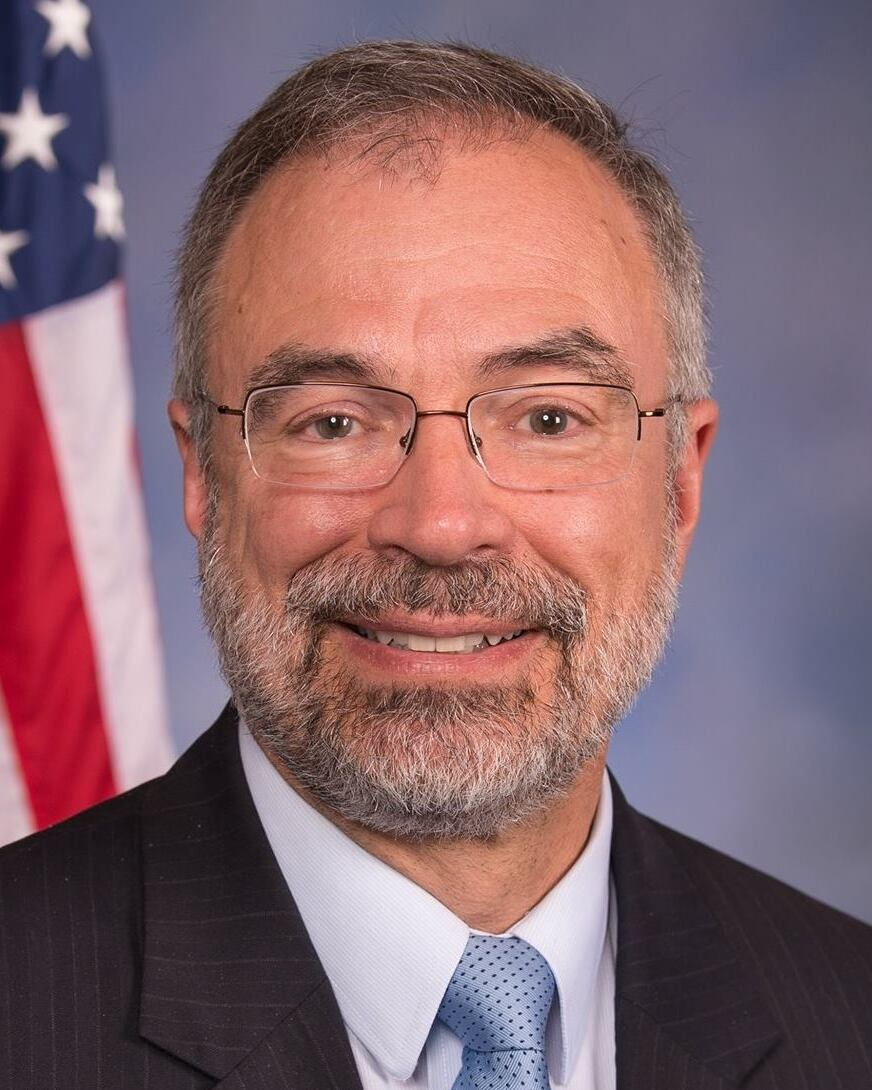

Nominee	Andy Harris	Dan Schwartz
Party	Republican	Democratic
Popular vote	165,256	151,285
Percentage	52.1%	47.7%
- Harris: 40–50% 50–60% 60–70% 70–80% 80–90% >90% Schwartz: 40–50% 50–60% 50–60% 60–70% 70–80% 80–90% >90% Tie: 50%
U.S. Representative before election
Andy Harris
Republican
Elected U.S. Representative
Andy Harris
Republican

The 1st district encompasses the entire Eastern Shore of Maryland, including Salisbury, Harford County, and parts of north Baltimore County. The incumbent is Republican Andy Harris, who was re-elected with 59.4% of the vote in 2024.

=== Republican primary ===
==== Candidates ====
===== Nominee =====
- Andy Harris, incumbent U.S. representative

===== Eliminated in primary =====
- Chris Bruneau, building contractor and candidate for this district in 2024

===== Declined =====
- Larry Hogan, former governor of Maryland (2015–2023) and nominee for U.S. Senate in 2024

==== Endorsements ====
Andy Harris

Organizations

- AIPAC
- Freedom Caucus Fund
- National Right to Life Committee
- NRA Political Victory Fund

==== Fundraising ====
Campaign finance reports as of June 30, 2026
Candidate	Raised	Spent	Cash on hand
Andy Harris (R)	$2,319,668	$1,221,001	$1,853,603
Source: Federal Election Commission

==== Results ====
Results by county Harris: 70–80%; 80–90%

Republican primary results
Party	Candidate	Votes	%
**Republican**	**Andy Harris (incumbent)**	**54,122**	**79.7**
Republican	Chris Bruneau	13,788	20.3
Total votes		**67,910**	**100.0**

=== Democratic primary ===
==== Candidates ====
===== Nominee =====
- Dan Schwartz, consumer advocate

===== Eliminated in primary =====
- Victor Guidice, commercial truck driver
- George Walish, former Saint Michaels town commissioner
- Randi White, marketing professional

==== Endorsements ====
Endorsements in bold were made after the primary elections.

Dan Schwartz

U.S. representatives

- Wayne Gilchrest, MD-01 (1991–2009) (formerly Republican)

Statewide officials

- Wes Moore, Maryland governor (2023–present)

Organizations

- Moms Demand Action (co-endorsed with White)
- **Sierra Club**
Randi White

Organizations

- Moms Demand Action (co-endorsed with Schwartz)

==== Fundraising ====
Campaign finance reports as of June 30, 2026
Candidate	Raised	Spent	Cash on hand
Dan Schwartz (D)	$695,170 (Note: $15,568 of this total was self-funded by Schwartz)	$622,595	$72,575
Randi White (D) (Note: As last reported on June 3, 2026)	$18,225 (Note: $8,356 of this total was self-funded by White)	$14,047	$1,381
Source: Federal Election Commission

==== Results ====
Results by county Schwartz: 40–50%; 50–60%; 60–70%; White: 40–50%; 60–70%

Democratic primary results
Party	Candidate	Votes	%
**Democratic**	**Dan Schwartz**	**19,821**	**46.3**
Democratic	Randi White	15,723	36.7
Democratic	Victor Allen Guidice	4,274	10.0
Democratic	George Walish	3,006	7.0
Total votes		**42,824**	**100.0**

=== General election ===
==== Debate ====
2026 Maryland's 1st congressional district debate
No.	Date	Host	Moderator	Link	Republican	Democratic
Key: P Participant A Absent N Not invited I Invited						
Key: P Participant A Absent N Not invited I Invited					Andy Harris	Dan Schwartz
1	Oct. 13, 2026	Eastern Shore League of Women Voters	Glenna Heckathorn	YouTube	**P**	**P**

==== Predictions ====
Source	Ranking	As of
Decision Desk HQ	Likely R	October 27, 2026
The Cook Political Report	Solid R	February 6, 2025
Inside Elections	Solid R	March 7, 2025
Sabato's Crystal Ball	Likely R	October 20, 2026

==== Polling ====
Poll source	Date(s) administered	Sample size (Note: Key: A – all adults RV – registered voters LV – likely voters V – unclear)	Margin of error	Andy Harris (R)	Dan Schwartz (D)	Other	Undecided
Z to A Research (D) (Note: Poll sponsored by Schwartz's campaign)	July 23–27, 2026	482 (LV)	± 4.46%	**52%**	39%	1% (Note: "Would not vote" with 1%)	7%

==== Fundraising ====
Campaign finance reports as of October 14, 2026
Candidate	Raised	Spent	Cash on hand
Andy Harris (R)	$2,703,696	$2,238,647	$1,219,985
Dan Schwartz (D)	$1,155,585 (Note: $15,568 of this total was self-funded by Schwartz)	$1,160,058	$0
Source: Federal Election Commission

==== Results ====
2026 Maryland's 1st congressional district election
Party	Candidate	Votes	%	±%
**Republican**	**Andy Harris (incumbent)**	**165,256**	**52.12%**	**−7.29%**
Democratic	Dan Schwartz	151,285	47.71%	+10.34%
Write-in		542	0.17%	+0.01%
Total votes		**317,083**	**100.00%**	

== District 2 ==
2026 Maryland's 2nd congressional district election

Nominee	Johnny Olszewski	Dave Wallace
Party	Democratic	Republican
Popular vote	189,855	101,464
Percentage	65.0%	34.8%
- Olszewski: 50–60% 50–60% 60–70% 70–80% 80–90% >90% Wallace: 50–60% 60–70% 70–80%
U.S. Representative before election
Johnny Olszewski
Democratic
Elected U.S. Representative
Johnny Olszewski
Democratic

The 2nd district encompasses much of Baltimore and Carroll counties, along with a portion of Baltimore itself. The incumbent is Democrat Johnny Olszewski, who was elected with 58.2% of the vote in 2024.

=== Democratic primary ===
==== Candidates ====
===== Nominee =====
- Johnny Olszewski, incumbent U.S. representative

===== Eliminated in primary =====
- Clint Spellman Jr., insurance agent and candidate for this district in 2024

==== Endorsements ====
Johnny Olszewski

Statewide officials

- Wes Moore, Maryland governor (2023–present)

Labor unions

- American Federation of Government Employees
- American Federation of State, County and Municipal Employees Council 3
- Association of Flight Attendants
- Maryland State & DC AFL-CIO
- National Education Association
- Service Employees International Union Local 500

Organizations

- AIPAC
- Democratic Majority for Israel
- Humane World Action Fund
- International Franchise Association
- Jewish Democratic Council of America
- Joint Action Committee for Political Affairs
- J Street
- League of Conservation Voters Action Fund
- Planned Parenthood Action Fund
- Sierra Club

Newspapers

- Baltimore Afro-American
Clint Spellman Jr.

Organizations

- Vote Common Good

==== Fundraising ====
Campaign finance reports as of June 30, 2026
Candidate	Raised	Spent	Cash on hand
Johnny Olszewski (D)	$1,040,389	$592,706	$614,275
Source: Federal Election Commission

==== Results ====
Democratic primary results
Party	Candidate	Votes	%
Democratic	Johnny Olszewski (incumbent)	65,646	84.5
Democratic	Clint Spellman, Jr.	12,019	15.5
Total votes		77,665	100.0

=== Republican primary ===
==== Candidates ====
===== Nominee =====
- Dave Wallace, business owner and perennial candidate

===== Eliminated in primary =====
- Nnabu Eze, IT contractor and perennial candidate

==== Fundraising ====
Campaign finance reports as of June 30, 2026
Candidate	Raised	Spent	Cash on hand
Dave Wallace (R)	$20,194	$17,122	$3,073
Source: Federal Election Commission

==== Results ====
Republican primary results
Party	Candidate	Votes	%
Republican	Dave Wallace	27,136	88.9
Republican	Nnabu Eze	3,404	11.2
Total votes		30,540	100.0

=== General election ===
==== Predictions ====
Source	Ranking	As of
Decision Desk HQ	Safe D	July 14, 2026
The Cook Political Report	Solid D	February 6, 2025
Inside Elections	Solid D	March 7, 2025
Sabato's Crystal Ball	Safe D	April 10, 2025

==== Fundraising ====
Campaign finance reports as of June 30, 2026
Candidate	Raised	Spent	Cash on hand
Johnny Olszewski (D)	$1,040,389	$592,706	$614,275
Dave Wallace (R)	$20,194	$17,122	$3,073
Source: Federal Election Commission

==== Results ====
2026 Maryland's 2nd congressional district election
Party	Candidate	Votes	%	±%
Democratic	Johnny Olszewski (incumbent)	189,855	65.04%	+6.88%
Republican	Dave Wallace	101,464	34.76%	−4.76
Write-in		601	0.21%	+0.02%
Total votes		291,920	100.00%	

== District 3 ==
2026 Maryland's 3rd congressional district election
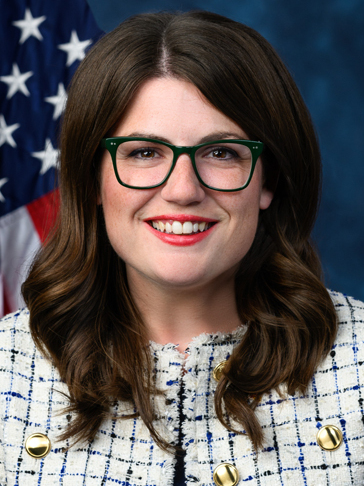

Nominee	Sarah Elfreth	Berney Flowers
Party	Democratic	Republican
Popular vote	212,087	100,088
Percentage	67.7%	32.0%
- Elfreth: 50–60% 50–60% 60–70% 70–80% 80–90% >90% Flowers: 50–60% 60–70% 70–80% >90%
U.S. Representative before election
Sarah Elfreth
Democratic
Elected U.S. Representative
Sarah Elfreth
Democratic

The 3rd district encompasses all of Howard County, much of Anne Arundel County, including Annapolis, and parts of Carroll County. The incumbent is Democrat Sarah Elfreth, who was elected with 59.3% of the vote in 2024.

=== Democratic primary ===
==== Candidates ====
===== Nominee =====
- Sarah Elfreth, incumbent U.S. representative

===== Eliminated in primary =====
- Jennifer Cross
- Austin Dyches, U.S. Army veteran
- Sean Hammond
- Robert Morrison

===== Withdrew =====
- John Rea, perennial candidate
- Felix Seier, U.S. Navy veteran (ran as a Republican)

==== Endorsements ====
Endorsements in bold were made after the primary elections.

Austin Dyches

Organizations

- Council on American–Islamic Relations Action
- Track AIPAC
Sarah Elfreth

Statewide officials

- Wes Moore, Maryland governor (2023–present)

Labor unions

- American Federation of Government Employees
- American Federation of State, County and Municipal Employees Council 3
- Maryland State & DC AFL-CIO
- National Education Association
- Service Employees International Union Local 500
- United Food and Commercial Workers Local 1994 MCGEO

Organizations

- AIPAC
- Elect Democratic Women
- **Humane World Action Fund**
- Jewish Democratic Council of America
- League of Conservation Voters Action Fund
- Moms Demand Action
- National Women's Political Caucus
- Natural Resources Defense Council Action Fund
- Planned Parenthood Action Fund
- Sierra Club

==== Fundraising ====
Campaign finance reports as of June 30, 2026
Candidate	Raised	Spent	Cash on hand
Sarah Elfreth (D)	$1,139,858	$834,771	$335,826
Source: Federal Election Commission

==== Results ====
Democratic primary results
Party	Candidate	Votes	%
**Democratic**	**Sarah Elfreth (incumbent)**	**55,784**	**74.7**
Democratic	Austin Dyches	7,999	10.7
Democratic	Jennifer Cross	6,178	8.3
Democratic	Sean Hammond	2,744	3.7
Democratic	Robert Gerald Morrison	1,961	2.6
Total votes		**74,666**	**100.0**

=== Republican primary ===
==== Candidates ====
===== Nominee =====
- Berney Flowers, former inter-agency technical advisor for NORAD and USNORTHCOM, candidate for the 2nd district in 2022, and this district in 2024

===== Eliminated in primary =====
- Ray Bly, perennial candidate
- Felix Seier, U.S. Navy veteran (previously ran as a Democrat)
- John White

==== Fundraising ====
Campaign finance reports as of June 30, 2026
Candidate	Raised	Spent	Cash on hand
Berney Flowers (R)	$9,860	$8,100	$2,016
Source: Federal Election Commission

==== Results ====
Republican primary results
Party	Candidate	Votes	%
**Republican**	**Berney Flowers**	**10,428**	**48.9**
Republican	John White	5,491	25.8
Republican	Ray Bly	3,241	15.2
Republican	Felix M. Seier	2,156	10.1
Total votes		**21,316**	**100.0**

=== General election ===
==== Predictions ====
Source	Ranking	As of
Decision Desk HQ	Safe D	July 14, 2026
The Cook Political Report	Solid D	February 6, 2025
Inside Elections	Solid D	March 7, 2025
Sabato's Crystal Ball	Safe D	April 10, 2025

==== Fundraising ====
Campaign finance reports as of June 30, 2026
Candidate	Raised	Spent	Cash on hand
Sarah Elfreth (D)	$1,139,858	$834,771	$335,826
Berney Flowers (R)	$9,860	$8,100	$2,016
Source: Federal Election Commission

==== Results ====
2026 Maryland's 3rd congressional district election
Party	Candidate	Votes	%	±%
**Democratic**	**Sarah Elfreth (incumbent)**	**212,087**	**67.74%**	**+8.45%**
Republican	Berney Flowers	100,088	31.97%	−5.90%
Write-in		892	0.29%	+0.07%
Total votes		**313,067**	**100.00%**	

== District 4 ==
2026 Maryland's 4th congressional district election
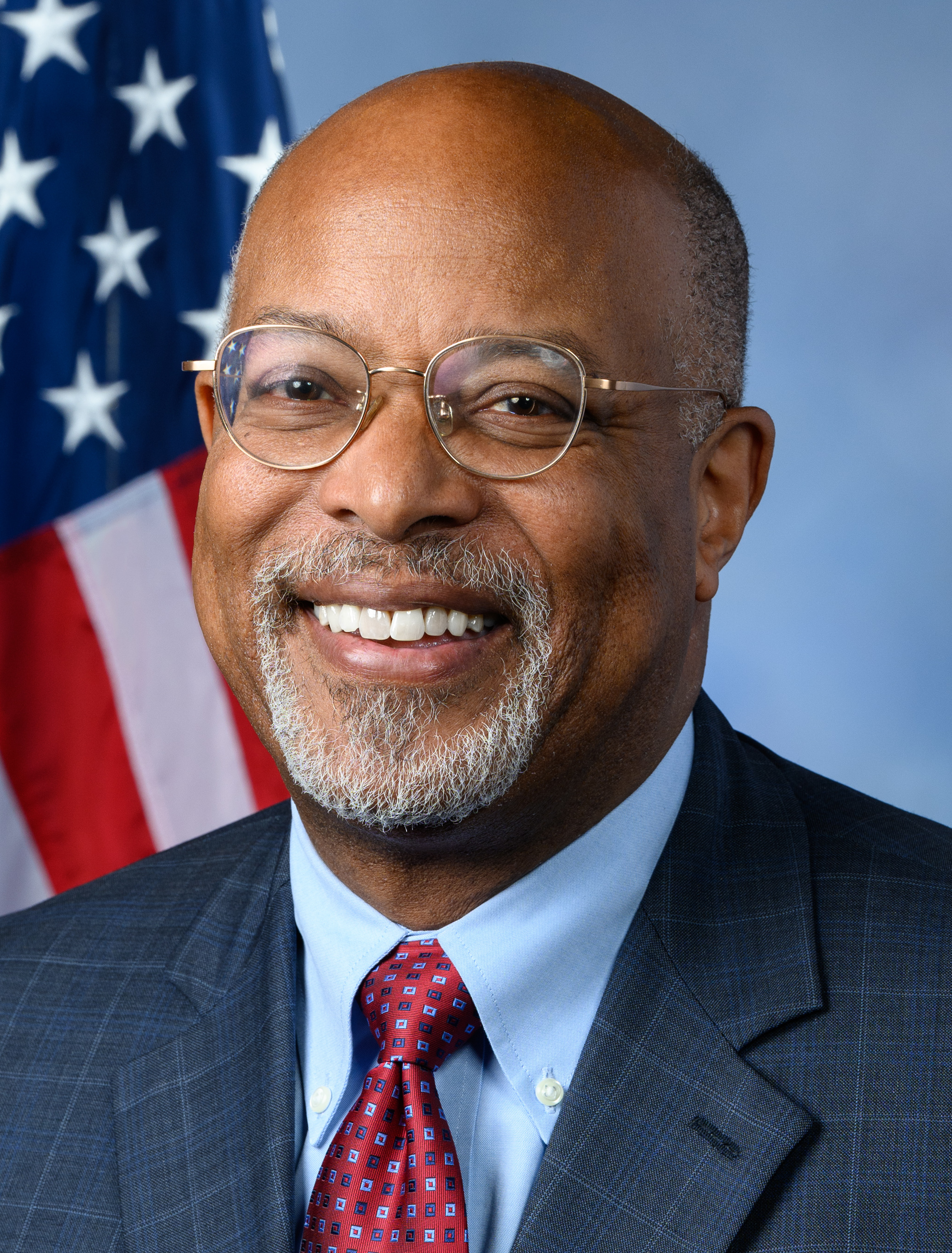

Nominee	Glenn Ivey	George McDermott
Party	Democratic	Republican
Popular vote	179,867	12,041
Percentage	89.4%	6.0%
U.S. Representative before election
Glenn Ivey
Democratic
Elected U.S. Representative
Glenn Ivey
Democratic

The 4th district encompasses parts of the Washington, D.C. suburbs in Prince George's County, including Landover, Laurel, and Suitland. The incumbent is Democrat Glenn Ivey, who was re-elected with 88.4% of the vote in 2024.

=== Democratic primary ===
==== Nominee ====
- Glenn Ivey, incumbent U.S. representative

===== Eliminated in primary =====
- Joseph Gomes, social worker and candidate for this district in 2024
- Shavonne Hedgepeth, capital planner
- Jakeya Johnson, grants specialist

===== Withdrawn =====
- Jonathan White, social worker (remained on ballot, endorsed Johnson)

==== Endorsements ====
Glenn Ivey

Statewide officials

- Wes Moore, Maryland governor (2023–present)

Labor unions

- Amalgamated Transit Union Local 689
- American Federation of Government Employees
- American Federation of State, County and Municipal Employees Council 3
- Maryland State & DC AFL-CIO
- National Education Association
- Service Employees International Union Local 500
- United Food and Commercial Workers Local 1994 MCGEO

Organizations

- ~~AIPAC~~
- Brady PAC
- ~~Democratic Majority for Israel~~
- Jewish Democratic Council of America
- Joint Action Committee for Political Affairs
- Planned Parenthood Action Fund
- Sierra Club

Newspapers

- Baltimore Afro-American
Jakeya Johnson

Organizations

- Council on American–Islamic Relations Action
- Progressive Victory
- Track AIPAC

==== Fundraising ====
Campaign finance reports as of June 30, 2026
Candidate	Raised	Spent	Cash on hand
Shavonne Hedgepeth (D)	$29,652 (Note: $12,038 of this total was self-funded by Hedgepeth)	$28,629	$0
Glenn Ivey (D)	$674,406	$520,568	$459,226
Jakeya Johnson (D)	$36,359 (Note: $1,209 of this total was self-funded by Johnson)	$31,525	$4,834
Jonathan White (D)	$34,101 (Note: $347 of this total was self-funded by White)	$16,111	$18,090
Source: Federal Election Commission

==== Results ====
Democratic primary results
Party	Candidate	Votes	%
Democratic	Glenn Ivey (incumbent)	60,099	79.2
Democratic	Jakeya Johnson	8,475	11.2
Democratic	Shavonne N. Hedgepeth	3,697	4.9
Democratic	Jonathan D. White	1,814	2.4
Democratic	Joseph Gomes	1,793	2.4
Total votes		75,878	100.0

=== Republican primary ===
==== Candidates ====
===== Nominee =====
- George McDermott, entrepreneur and perennial candidate

==== Results ====
Republican primary results
Party	Candidate	Votes	%
Republican	George McDermott	1,923	100.0
Total votes		1,923	100.0

=== Third-party and independent candidates ===
==== Candidates ====
- Sam Husseini (Green), communications director of the Institute for Public Accuracy

=== General election ===
==== Predictions ====
Source	Ranking	As of
Decision Desk HQ	Safe D	July 14, 2026
The Cook Political Report	Solid D	February 6, 2025
Inside Elections	Solid D	March 7, 2025
Sabato's Crystal Ball	Safe D	April 10, 2025

==== Fundraising ====
Campaign finance reports as of June 30, 2026
Candidate	Raised	Spent	Cash on hand
Glenn Ivey (D)	$674,406	$520,568	$459,226
Source: Federal Election Commission

==== Results ====
2026 Maryland's 4th congressional district election
Party	Candidate	Votes	%	±%
Democratic	Glenn Ivey (incumbent)			
Republican	George McDermott			
Green	Sam Husseini			N/A
Write-in				
Total votes				

== District 5 ==
2026 Maryland's 5th congressional district election
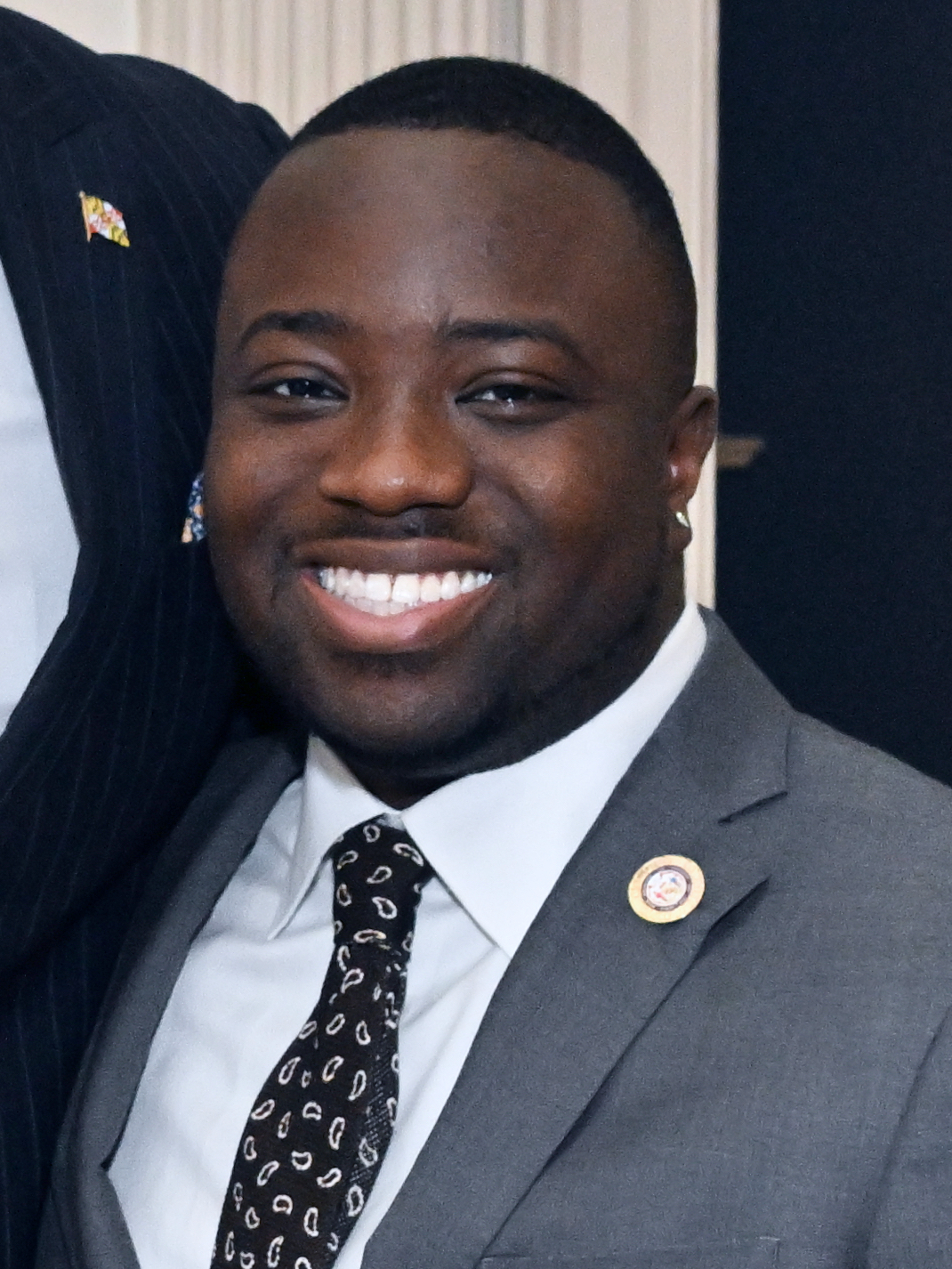

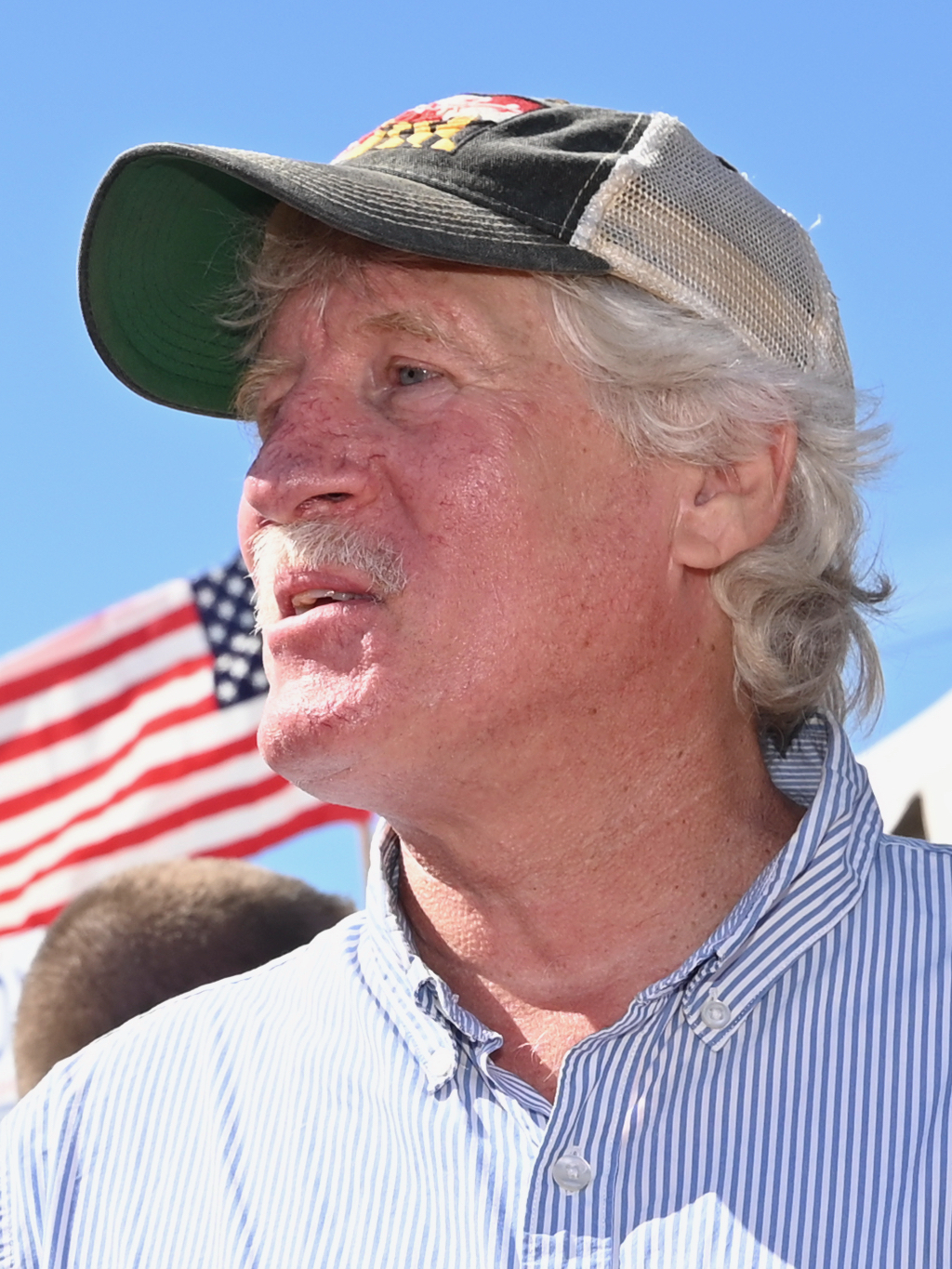
Nominee	Adrian Boafo	Chris Chaffee
Party	Democratic	Republican
Popular vote	228,075	92,563
Percentage	71.1%	28.9%
- County results Boafo: 60–70% 70–80% 90–100% Chaffee: 50–60%
U.S. Representative before election
Steny Hoyer
Democratic
Elected U.S. Representative
Adrian Boafo
Democratic

The 5th district is based in southern Maryland, and encompasses Charles, St. Mary's, Calvert counties and a small portion of southern Anne Arundel County, as well as the Washington, D.C. suburbs of Bowie and Upper Marlboro. Incumbent Democrat Steny Hoyer, who was re-elected with 67.8% of the vote in 2024, announced in early January that he would not run for re-election.

=== Democratic primary ===
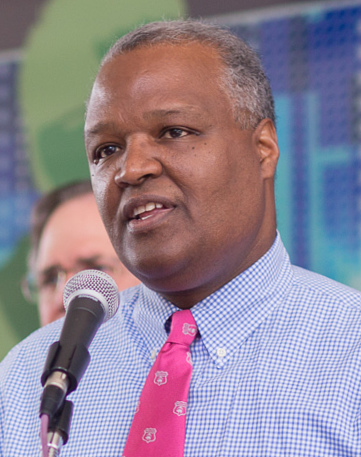
Rushern Baker

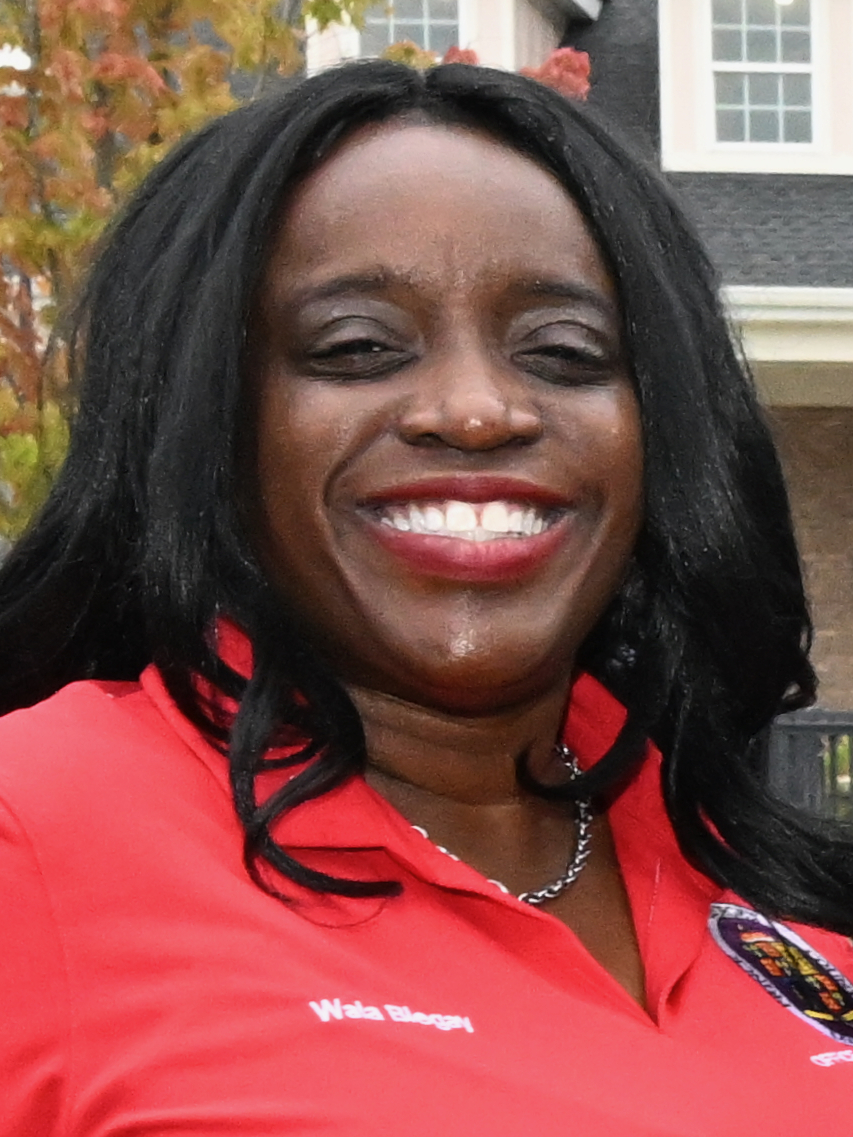
Wala Blegay

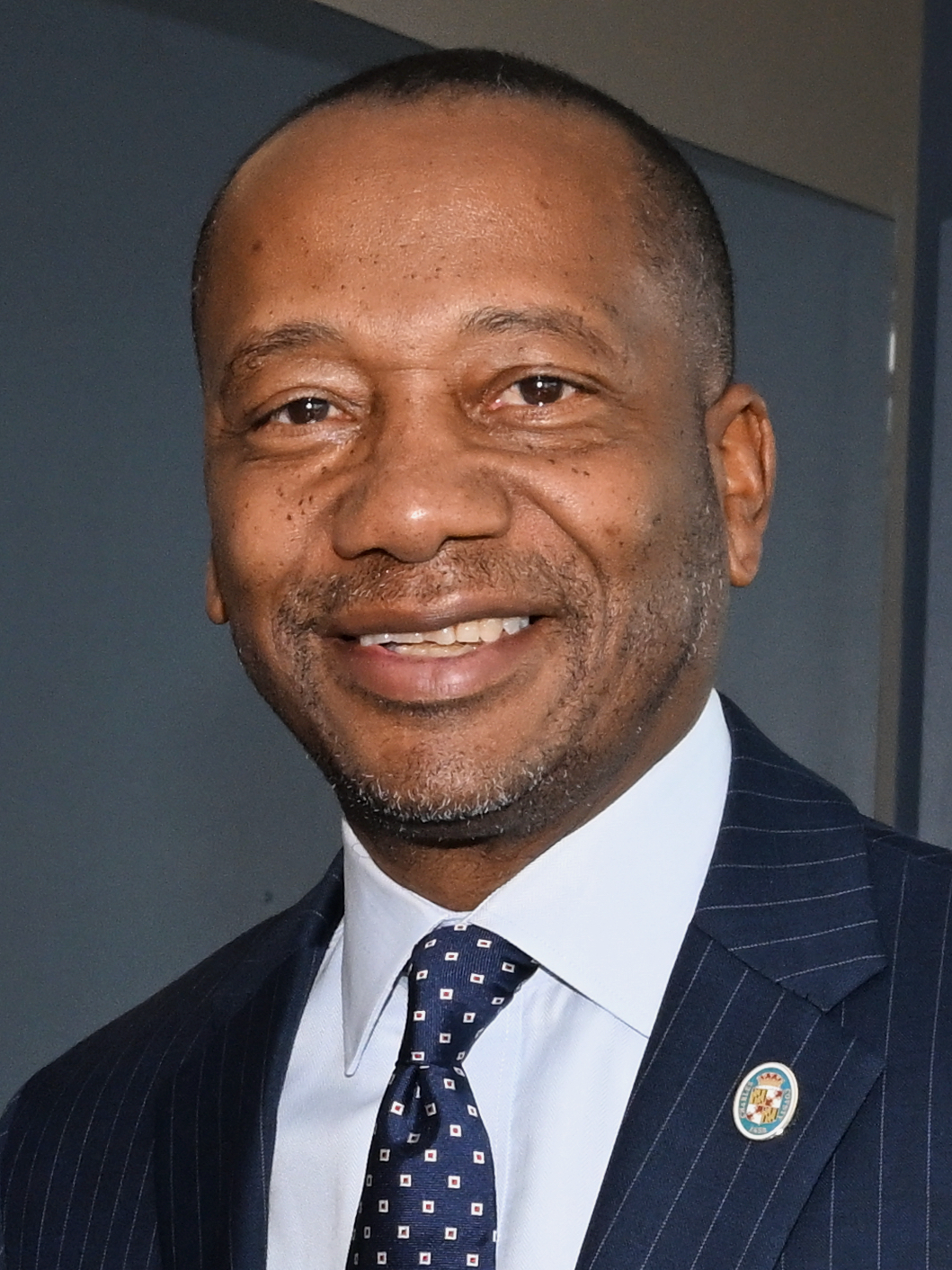
Reuben Collins II

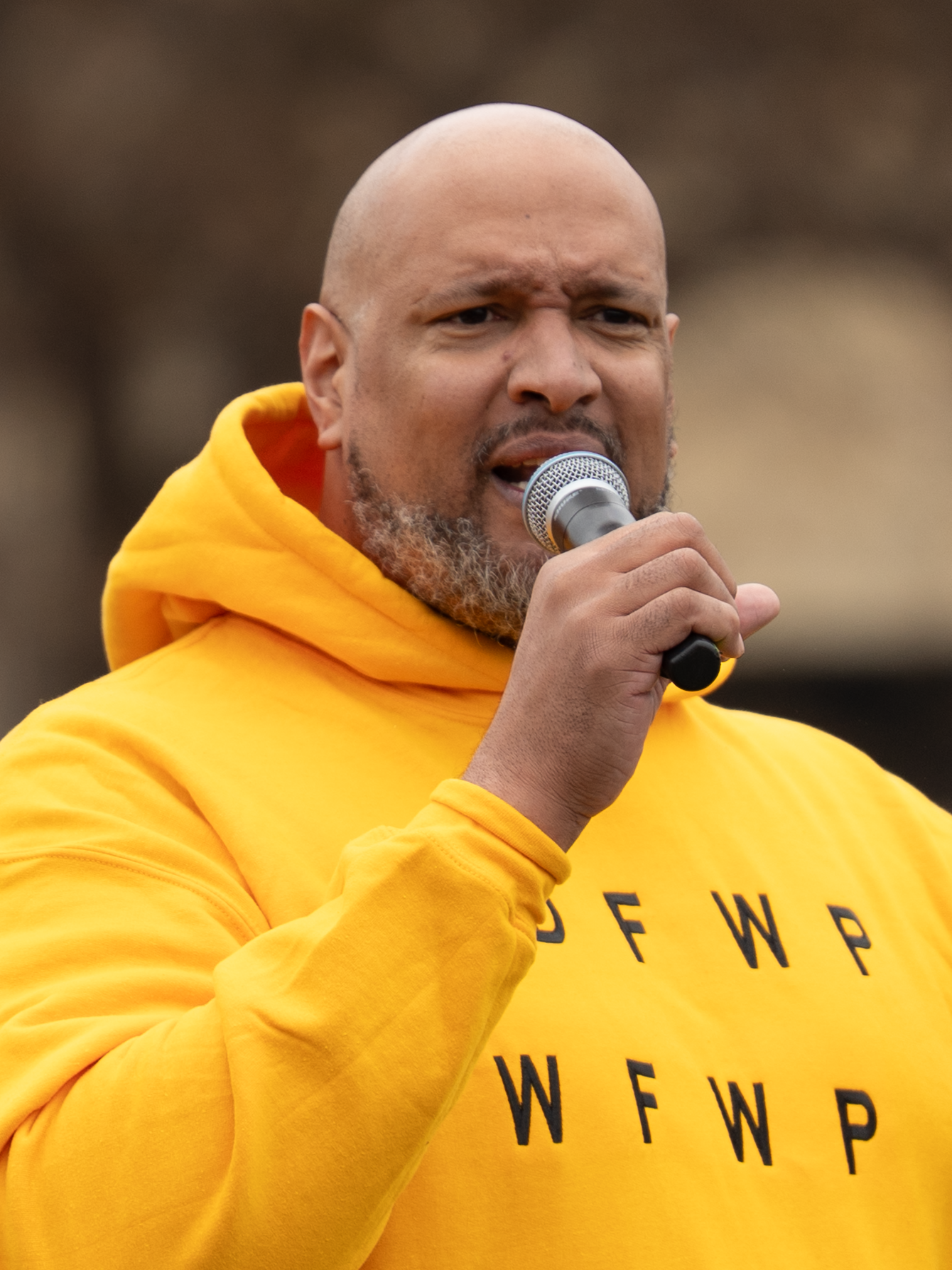
Harry Dunn

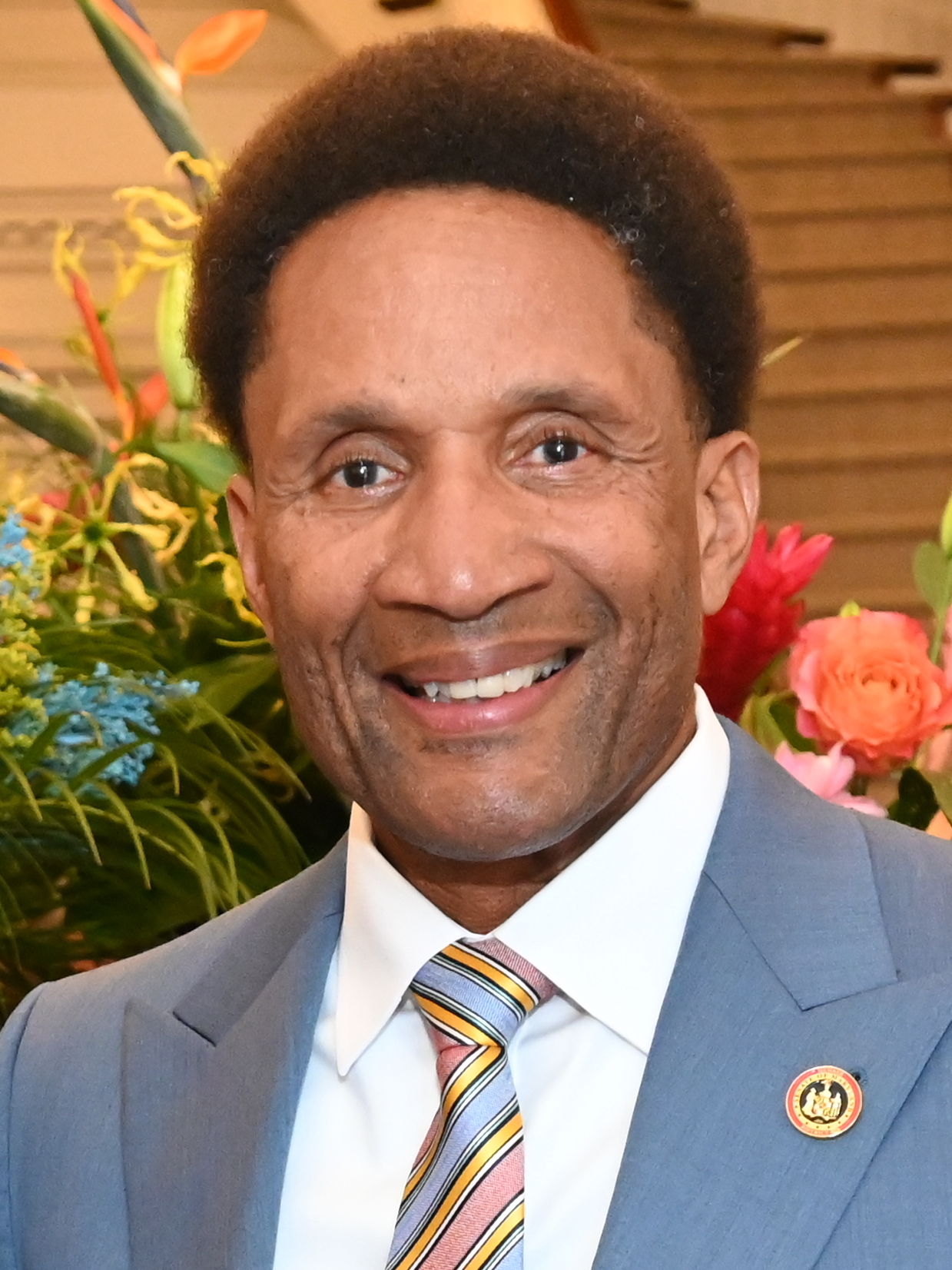
Arthur Ellis

==== Candidates ====
===== Nominee =====
- Adrian Boafo, state delegate from the 23rd district (2023–present)

===== Eliminated in primary =====
- Rushern Baker, former Prince George's County executive (2010–2018), candidate for governor in 2018 and 2022, and candidate for county executive in 2025
- Quincy Bareebe, assisted living care center owner and candidate for this district in 2024
- Wala Blegay, Prince George's County councilmember (2022–present)
- Reuben Collins II, president of the Charles County Board of Commissioners (2018–present)
- Ellis Colvin, U.S. Army veteran
- Harry Dunn, former U.S. Capitol Police officer and candidate for the 3rd district in 2024
- Arthur Ellis, state senator from the 28th district (2019–present)
- Elldwnia English
- Harry Jarin, emergency services consultant
- Walter Kirkland, community activist
- Jerry Lightfoot
- Heather Luper, social worker
- James Makle Jr., emergency medical technician
- Leigha Messick, nonprofit executive
- Keith Salkowski, actor and Green Party nominee for the 2nd district in 2004
- Kenny Simons, lobbyist
- Alexis Solis, consulting firm owner
- Tracy Starr, former USAID crisis operations officer
- David Sundberg, former FBI assistant director
- Harold Tolbert, entrepreneur

===== Withdrew =====
- Mark Arness, U.S. Air Force veteran and Republican nominee for this district in 2016 and candidate in 2014 (remained on ballot)
- Jennifer Cross (ran in the 3rd district)
- Terry Jackson, former federal physical security specialist (remained on ballot)
- Nicole Williams, state delegate from the 22nd district (2019–present) (remained on ballot)

===== Declined =====
- Tim Adams, Prince George's County councilmember from the 4th district (2026–present), former mayor of Bowie (2019–2026) and candidate for comptroller in 2022 (ran for re-election)
- Steny Hoyer, incumbent U.S. representative (endorsed Boafo)
- Steuart Pittman, Anne Arundel County executive (2018–present) and chair of the Maryland Democratic Party (2025–present)
- C. T. Wilson, state delegate from the 28th district (2011–present) (ran for state senate)

==== Endorsements ====
Endorsements in bold were made after the primary election.

Rushern Baker

Executive Branch officials

- Martin O'Malley, former commissioner of the Social Security Administration (2023–2024) and governor of Maryland (2007–2015)

Organizations

- Moms Demand Action (Note: Co-endorsed with Arness, Baker, Bareebe, Boafo, Dunn, Jarin, Lightfoot, Messick, Starr, and Williams)
- With Honor Fund
Quincy Bareebe

U.S. representatives

- Jamaal Bowman, former NY-16 (2021–2025)

County officials

- Aisha Braveboy, Prince George's County executive (2025–present) (previously endorsed Blegay)

Organizations

- Moms Demand Action
Wala Blegay

U.S. representatives

- Ro Khanna, CA-17 (2017–present)

State legislators

- C. Anthony Muse, state senator from the 26th district (2007–2019, 2023–present)

County officials

- ~~Aisha Braveboy, Prince George's County executive (2025–present)~~ (switched endorsement to Bareebe)

Labor unions

- Amalgamated Transit Union Local 689
- Communication Workers of America (co-endorsement with Boafo)
- National Nurses United

Organizations

- CASA in Action
- Council on American–Islamic Relations Action
- Our Revolution
- Progressive Democrats of America
- Sierra Club
Adrian Boafo

U.S. senators

- Angela Alsobrooks, U.S. senator from Maryland (2025–present)

U.S. representatives

- Sarah Elfreth, MD-03 (2025–present)
- Steny Hoyer, MD-05 (1981–present)
- Albert Wynn, MD-04 (1993–2008)

Statewide officials

- Wes Moore, Maryland governor (2023–present)

State legislators

- Dylan Behler, state delegate from district 30A (2025–present)
- Pamela Beidle, state senator from the 32nd district (2019–present)
- John Bohanan, state delegate from district 29B (1999–2015)
- Mark S. Chang, state delegate from the 32nd district (2015–present)
- Nick Charles state senator from the 25th district (2023–present)
- Dawn Gile, state senator from the 33rd district (2023–present)
- Kevin Harris, state senator from the 27th district (2025–present)
- Marvin E. Holmes Jr., state delegate from the 23rd district (2003–present)
- Dana Jones, state delegate from district 30A (2020–present)
- Rachel Jones, state delegate from district 27B (2021–2023)
- Cheryl Landis, state delegate from district 23B (2021–2023)
- Darrell Odom, state delegate from district 27A (2026–present)
- Andrew Pruski, state delegate from district 33A (2023–present)
- Kent Roberson, state delegate from the 25th district (2023–present)
- Denise Roberts, state delegate from the 25th district (2024–present)
- Geraldine Valentino-Smith, state delegate from district 23A (2011–2023)
- Kym Taylor, state delegate from the 23rd district (2023–present)
- Karen Toles, state delegate from the 25th district (2022–present)
- Ron Watson, state senator from the 23rd district (2021–present)

Individuals

- Yvette Lewis, chair of the Maryland Democratic Party (2011–2015, 2019–2023)

Labor unions

- American Federation of Government Employees
- Communication Workers of America (co-endorsement with Blegay)
- Bricklayers and Allied Craftworkers Local 1
- Maryland State Education Association
- National Education Association
- Service Employees International Union Local 500
- SMART

Organizations

- Democratic Majority for Israel
- **Giffords**
- **Jewish Democratic Council of America**
- **League of Conservation Voters Action Fund**
- Moms Demand Action
- New Democrat Coalition
- Protect Progress
- United Democracy Project

Newspapers

- Baltimore Afro-American
Harry Dunn

U.S. representatives

- Nancy Pelosi, former speaker of the House (2007–2011, 2019–2023) from CA-11 (1987–present)

Organizations

- End Citizens United
- Moms Demand Action
- Working Families Party
Harry Jarin

Organizations

- Moms Demand Action
Jerry Lightfoot

Organizations

- Moms Demand Action
Leigha Messick

Organizations

- Moms Demand Action
Tracy Starr

Organizations

- Moms Demand Action
Mark Arness (withdrawn)

Organizations

- Moms Demand Action
Nicole Williams (withdrawn)

Statewide officials

- Dereck E. Davis, state treasurer of Maryland (2021–present)

Organizations

- Moms Demand Action
Declined to endorse

U.S. senators

- Chris Van Hollen, U.S. senator from Maryland (2017–present)

State legislators

- Nicole A. Williams, state delegate from the 22nd district (2019–present) and candidate for this district in 2026

Organizations

- EMILYs List

==== Fundraising ====
During the Democratic primary, Boafo received financial support from Hoyer, including $500,000 from his leadership PAC, Ameripac. He also received support from Protect Progress, a PAC funded by the cryptocurrency industry, and from AIPAC's United Democracy Project super PAC.

Campaign finance reports as of June 30, 2026
Candidate	Raised	Spent	Cash on hand
Rushern Baker (D)	$369,665 (Note: $41,950 of this total was self-funded by Baker)	$294,460	$75,204
Quincy Bareebe (D)	$6,808,528 (Note: $6,613,000 of this total was self-funded by Bareebe)	$6,794,549	$14,198
Wala Blegay (D) (Note: As of last reported March 31, 2026)	$396,714	$89,551	$307,163
Adrian Boafo (D)	$1,676,916	$1,585,049	$91,867
Reuben Collins II (D)	$39,871	$33,610	$6,261
Harry Dunn (D)	$4,900,230	$4,535,958	$364,272
Arthur Ellis (D)	$227,421 (Note: $200,000 of this total was self-funded by Ellis)	$149,052	$78,370
Terry Jackson (D)	$16,322 (Note: $8,392 of this total was self-funded by Jackson)	$16,322	$0
Harry Jarin (D)	$432,658 (Note: $350,000 of this total was self-funded by Jarin)	$432,658	$0
Walter Kirkland (D)	$48,296	$49,603	$0
Heather Luper (D)	$28,563 (Note: $14,500 of this total was self-funded by Luper)	$28,263	$300
Leigha Messick (D) (Note: As of last reported June 3, 2026)	$7,990 (Note: $1,900 of this total was self-funded by Messick)	$4,559	$3,431
Kenny Simons (D) (Note: As of last reported June 12, 2026)	$14,105	$550	$0
Alexis Solis (D)	$29,633	$25,133	$4,500
Tracy Starr (D)	$33,254 (Note: $254 of this total was self-funded by Starr)	$30,604	$2,649
David Sundberg (D)	$188,438 (Note: $49,400 of this total was self-funded by Sundberg)	$188,438	$0
Nicole Williams (D)	$151,952 (Note: $85,053 of this total was self-funded by Williams)	$138,299	$13,653
Source: Federal Election Commission

==== Polling ====
Poll source	Date(s) administered	Sample size	Margin of error	Rushern Baker	Quincy Bareebe	Wala Blegay	Adrian Boafo	Harry Dunn	Arthur Ellis	Harry Jarin	Nicole Williams	Other	Undecided
Clarity Campaign (Note: Poll sponsored by Protect Progress, which supports Boafo.)	May 26–28, 2026	526 (RV)	± 3.21%	10%	10%	5%	**17%**	5%	2%	1%	–	6% (Note: "Someone else" with 6%)	**43%**
GQR (D) (Note: Poll sponsored by Baker's campaign)	February 26 – March 1, 2026	400 (LV)	± 4.9%	**22%**	6%	11%	3%	15%	5%	1%	9%	<1% (Note: "Someone else" with less than 1%)	**28%**

==== Results ====
Results by county Boafo: 30–40%

Results by precinct Boafo: 10–20%; 20–30%; 30–40%; 40–50%; 50–60%; 60–70%; >90%; Bareebe: 20–30%; 30–40%; >90%; Dunn: 20–30%; >90%; Blegay: 20–30%; 40–50%; Baker: 20–30%; Tie: 20–30%; 30–40%; 40–50%; 50%

Democratic primary results
Party	Candidate	Votes	%
**Democratic**	**Adrian Boafo**	**33,081**	**32.7**
Democratic	Quincy Bareebe	17,515	17.3
Democratic	Harry Dunn	14,189	14.0
Democratic	Wala Blegay	11,258	11.1
Democratic	Rushern Baker	10,588	10.5
Democratic	Arthur Ellis	2,883	2.9
Democratic	Reuben B. Collins, II	1,640	1.6
Democratic	Harry Jarin	1,515	1.5
Democratic	Nicole A. Williams (withdrawn)	1,445	1.4
Democratic	Alexis S. Solis	949	0.9
Democratic	Dave Sundberg	898	0.9
Democratic	Leigha Messick	795	0.8
Democratic	Mark Arness (withdrawn)	617	0.6
Democratic	Walter Kirkland	505	0.5
Democratic	Tracy Starr	502	0.5
Democratic	Jerry Lightfoot	460	0.5
Democratic	Terry Jackson II (withdrawn)	403	0.4
Democratic	Heather Luper	377	0.4
Democratic	Harold Tolbert	373	0.4
Democratic	Ellis D. Colvin	286	0.3
Democratic	Elldwnia English	257	0.3
Democratic	Keith Salkowski	203	0.2
Democratic	Kenneth Simons	160	0.2
Democratic	James Anderson Makle, Jr.	149	0.2
Total votes		**101,048**	**100.0**

=== Republican primary ===
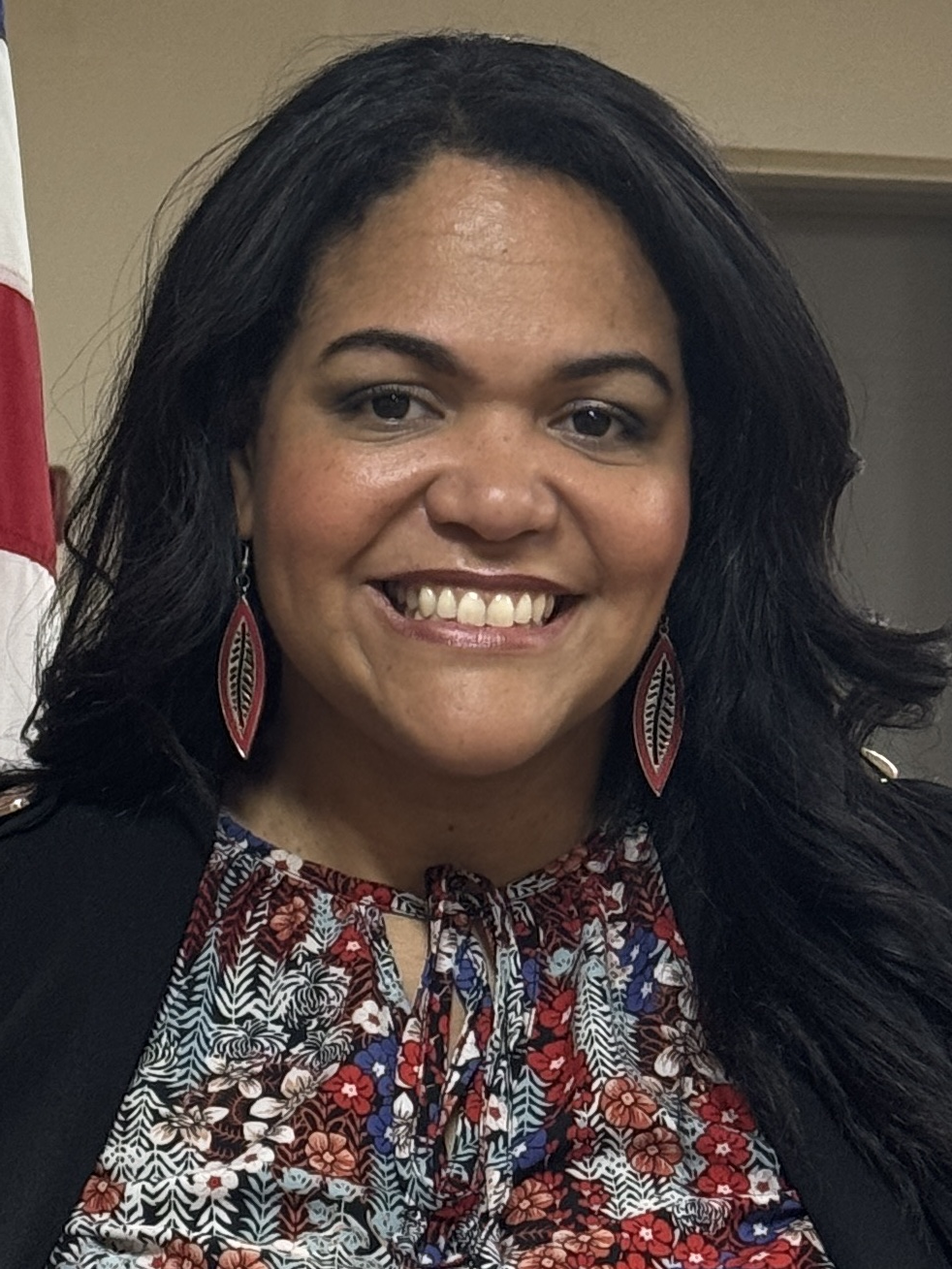
Michelle Talkington placed second in the Republican primary.

==== Candidates ====
===== Nominee =====
- Chris Chaffee, perennial candidate and nominee for U.S. Senate in 2022

===== Eliminated in primary =====
- Bryan DuVal Cubero, veteran and candidate for this district in 2020 and 2022
- Michelle Talkington, businesswoman, youth minister, and nominee for this district in 2024

===== Withdrew =====
- Jordan Eversley

==== Fundraising ====
Campaign finance reports as of June 30, 2026
Candidate	Raised	Spent	Cash on hand
Michelle Talkington (R)	$15,640	$15,193	$2,453
Source: Federal Election Commission

==== Results ====
Results by county Chaffee: 40–50%; 50–60%; Talkington: 40–50%

Republican primary results
Party	Candidate	Votes	%
**Republican**	**Chris Chaffee**	**11,536**	**51.2**
Republican	Michelle Talkington	7,866	34.9
Republican	Bryan DuVal	3,145	14.0
Total votes		**22,547**	**100.0**

=== Independent and third-party candidates ===
==== Candidates ====
===== Disqualified =====
- Jonathan Burruss (Unaffiliated)
- Brian Jordan (Unaffiliated), research and development executive

=== General election ===
==== Predictions ====
Source	Ranking	As of
Decision Desk HQ	Safe D	July 14, 2026
The Cook Political Report	Solid D	February 6, 2025
Inside Elections	Solid D	March 7, 2025
Sabato's Crystal Ball	Safe D	April 10, 2025

==== Fundraising ====
Campaign finance reports as of June 30, 2026
Candidate	Raised	Spent	Cash on hand
Adrian Boafo (D)	$1,676,916	$1,585,049	$91,867
Source: Federal Election Commission

==== Results ====
2026 Maryland's 5th congressional district election
Party	Candidate	Votes	%	±%
**Democratic**	**Adrian Boafo**			
Republican	Chris Chaffee			
Write-in				
Total votes				

== District 6 ==
2026 Maryland's 6th congressional district election
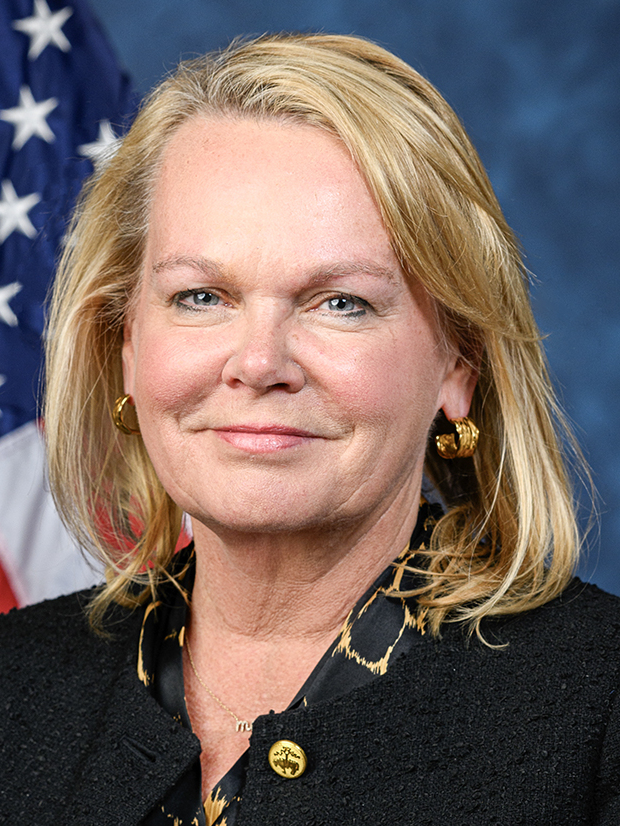

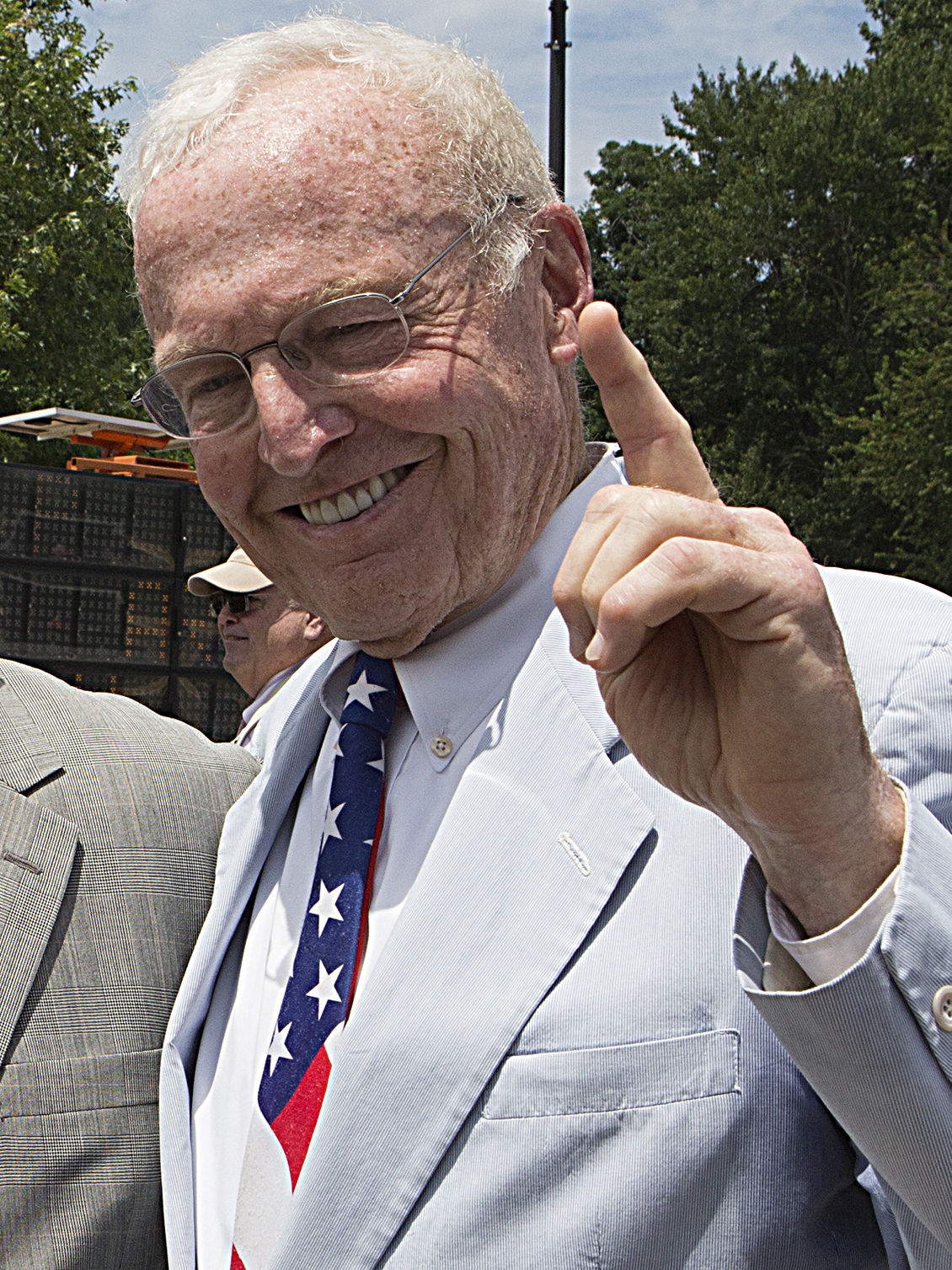
Nominee	April McClain Delaney	Robin Ficker
Party	Democratic	Republican
Popular vote	165,031	104,682
Percentage	59.3%	37.6%
- McClain Delaney: 40–50% 50–60% 50–60% 60–70% 70–80% 80–90% Ficker: 40–50% 50–60% 60–70% 70–80% 80–90% >90%
U.S. Representative before election
April McClain Delaney
Democratic
Elected U.S. Representative
April McClain Delaney
Democratic

The 6th district is based in western Maryland. It covers all of Garrett, Allegany, Washington, and Frederick counties, and extends south into the Washington, D.C. suburbs in Montgomery County, including Germantown and Gaithersburg. The incumbent is Democrat April McClain Delaney, who was elected with 53.0% of the vote in 2024.

=== Democratic primary ===
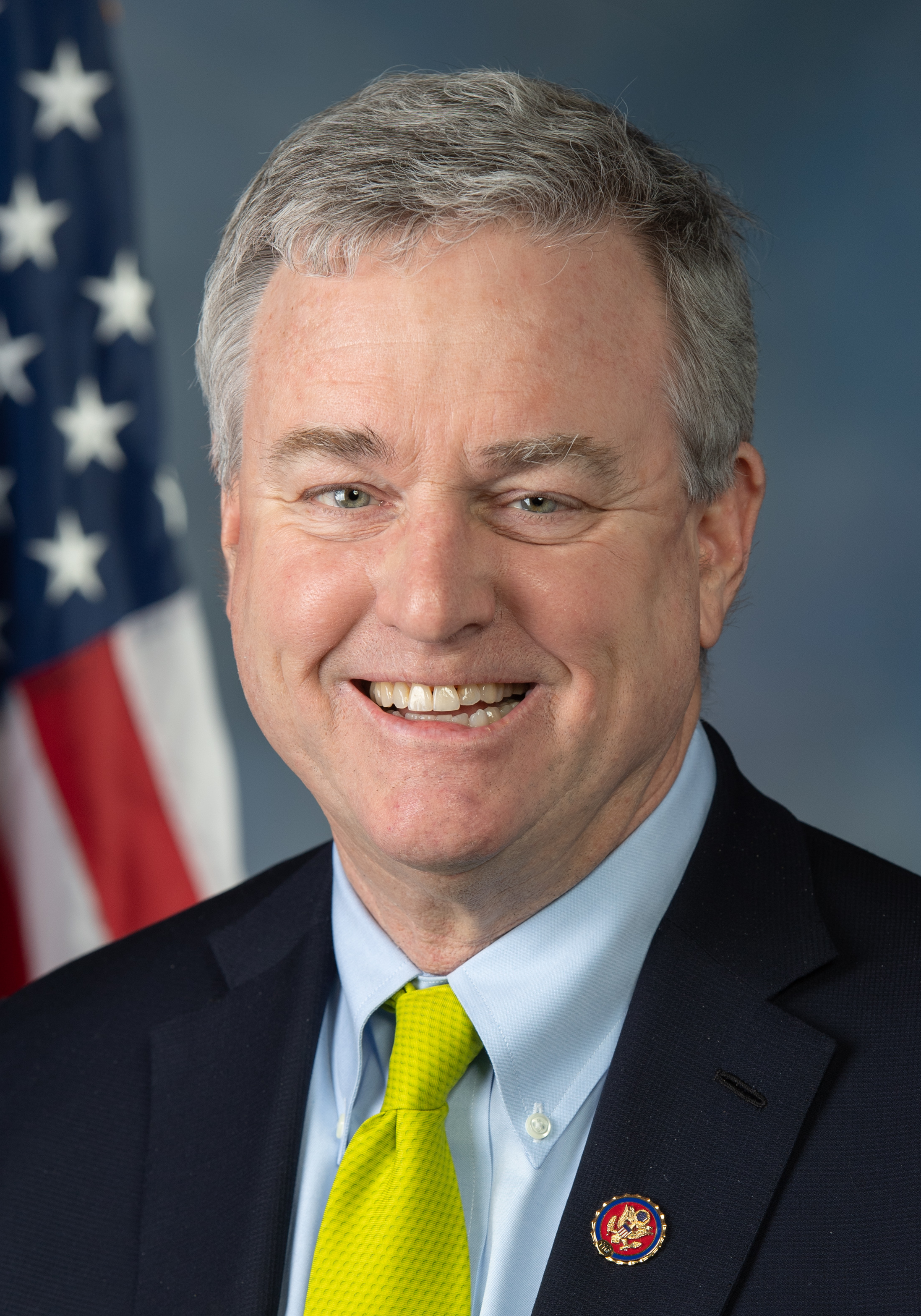
McClain Delaney faced a primary challenge from her predecessor, former U.S. representative David Trone.

==== Candidates ====
===== Nominee =====
- April McClain Delaney, incumbent U.S. representative

===== Eliminated in primary =====
- Alexis Goldstein, former Consumer Financial Protection Bureau official
- George Gluck, perennial candidate
- David Trone, former U.S. representative (2019–2025) and candidate for U.S. Senate in 2024
- Ethan Wechtaluk, federal consultant
- Kiambo White, union representative and candidate for this district in 2024
- Altimont Wilks, grocery store owner and candidate for this district in 2024

===== Withdrawn =====
- Daniel Krakower, attorney (remained on ballot)

==== Endorsements ====
Endorsements in bold were made following the primary elections.

Alexis Goldstein

Organizations

- Progressive Democrats of America
April McClain Delaney

U.S. senators

- Angela Alsobrooks, Maryland (2025–present)
- Chris Van Hollen, Maryland (2017–present)

U.S. representatives

- Sarah Elfreth, MD-03 (2025–present)
- Steny Hoyer, MD-05 (1981–present)
- Glenn Ivey, MD-04 (2023–present)
- Sarah McBride, DE-AL (2025–present)
- Kweisi Mfume, MD-07 (1987–1996, 2020–present)
- Johnny Olszewski, MD-02 (2025–present)
- Nancy Pelosi, CA-11 (1987–present)
- Jamie Raskin, MD-08 (2017–present)

Statewide officials

- Anthony Brown, attorney general of Maryland (2023–present)
- Aruna Miller, lieutenant governor of Maryland (2023–present)
- Wes Moore, governor of Maryland (2023–present)

State legislators

- Cheryl Kagan, state senator from the 17th district (2015–present)
- Joe Vogel, state delegate from the 17th district (2023–present) and candidate for this district in 2024
- Karen Lewis Young, state senator from the 3rd district (2023–present)

County officials

- Sidney A. Katz, member of the Montgomery County Council from the 3rd district (2014–present)

Labor unions

- American Federation of Government Employees
- **Maryland State Education Association**
- United Food and Commercial Workers Local 1994 MCGEO

Organizations

- AIPAC
- Democratic Majority for Israel
- Elect Democratic Women
- EMILYs List
- Humane World Action Fund
- Jewish Democratic Council of America
- League of Conservation Voters Action Fund
- Moms Demand Action (co-endorsed with Trone and White)
- National Committee to Preserve Social Security and Medicare
- NewDem Action Fund
- Planned Parenthood Action Fund
- Reproductive Freedom for All
- Sierra Club
- **United States Chamber of Commerce**
David Trone

State legislators

- Ana Sol Gutierrez, former state delegate from the 18th district (2003–2019)
- Nancy J. King, majority leader of the Maryland Senate (2020–present) from the 39th district (2007–present)
- Ronald N. Young, former state senator from the 3rd district (2011–2023)

County officials

- Jessica Fitzwater, Frederick County Executive (2022–present)

Labor unions

- Maryland State Education Association
- National Education Association
- Service Employees International Union Local 500
- UNITE HERE Local 25

Organizations

- Maryland National Organization for Women PAC
- Moms Demand Action (co-endorsed with McClain Delaney and White)

Newspapers

- Washington Jewish Week
Ethan Wechtaluk

Organizations

- Council on American–Islamic Relations Action
- Progressive Victory
- Track AIPAC
Kiambo White

Organizations

- Moms Demand Action (co-endorsed with McClain Delaney and Trone)

==== Fundraising ====
Campaign finance reports as of June 30, 2026
Candidate	Raised	Spent	Cash on hand
George Gluck (D) (Note: As of last reported June 10, 2026)	$102,176 (Note: $101,618 of this total was self-funded by Gluck)	$102,052	$224
Alexis Goldstein (D) (Note: As of last reported June 3, 2026)	$41,096	$4,520	$0
April McClain Delaney (D)	$12,308,220 (Note: $11,000,000 of this total was self-funded by McClain Delaney)	$12,013,488	$307,611
David Trone (D)	$26,207,404 (Note: $25,000,000 of this total was self-funded by Trone)	$24,745,121	$1,466,124
Ethan Wechtaluk (D)	$15,247 (Note: $2,395 of this total was self-funded by Wechtaluk)	$15,118	$129
Source: Federal Election Commission

==== Polling ====
Poll source	Date(s) administered	Sample size	Margin of error	April McClain Delaney	David Trone	Other	Undecided
Global Strategy Group (D) (Note: Poll sponsored by Trone's campaign)	June 8–11, 2026	500 (LV)	± 4.4%	40%	**43%**	–	17%
Hart Research (D) (Note: Poll sponsored by McClain Delaney's campaign)	June 2–4, 2026	500 (LV)	± 4.5%	**52%**	37%	–	12%
Impact Research (D)	May 26–28, 2026	500 (LV)	± 4.4%	43%	**45%**	–	12%
Hart Research (D)	May 16–18, 2026	500 (LV)	± 4.5%	**49%**	34%	–	17%
Impact Research (D)	May 11–14, 2026	500 (LV)	± 4.4%	41%	**43%**	–	16%
Hart Research (D)	April 11–14, 2026	564 (LV)	± 4.2%	**49%**	38%	–	13%
The Public Sentiment Institute (Note: Poll sponsored by Federal Elections Analysis)	April 8–11, 2026	154 (LV)	–	30%	**51%**	4% (Note: Ethan Wechtaluk, George Gluck, Alexis Goldstein, and Daniel Krakower with 1%)	15%
Hart Research (D)	March 16–21, 2026	500 (LV)	± 4.5%	**49%**	37%	–	14%
Hart Research (D)	December 9–16, 2025	600 (LV)	± 4.1%	**50%**	33%	–	17%

==== Results ====
Results by county McClain Delaney: 40–50%; Trone: 40–50%

Democratic primary results
Party	Candidate	Votes	%
**Democratic**	**April McClain Delaney (incumbent)**	**27,819**	**44.0**
Democratic	David Trone	23,383	37.0
Democratic	Alexis Goldstein	6,201	9.8
Democratic	Ethan Wechtaluk	3,469	5.5
Democratic	George Gluck	933	1.5
Democratic	Kiambo "Bo" White	670	1.1
Democratic	A. Mark Wilks	556	0.9
Democratic	Daniel Krakower (withdrawn)	187	0.3
Total votes		**63,218**	**100.0**

=== Republican primary ===
==== Candidates ====
===== Nominee =====
- Robin Ficker, former state delegate from district 15B (1979–1983), sports heckler, and perennial candidate

===== Eliminated in primary =====
- Chris Burnett, retired U.S. Marine Corps veteran
- Mariela Roca, medical logistics specialist and candidate for this district in 2022 and 2024

===== Declined =====
- Jason Buckel, minority leader of the Maryland House of Delegates (2021–present) from district 1B (2015–present) (ran for re-election)
- Chuck Jenkins, Frederick County Sheriff (2006–present) (ran for re-election)
- Neil Parrott, former state delegate from district 2A (2011–2023) and nominee for this district in 2020, 2022, and 2024

==== Fundraising ====
Campaign finance reports as of June 30, 2026
Candidate	Raised	Spent	Cash on hand
Chris Burnett (R)	$102,142 (Note: $6,023 of this total was self-funded by Burnett)	$94,187	$1,084
Robin Ficker (R)	$403,934 (Note: $402,862 of this total was self-funded by Ficker)	$403,533	$401
Mariela Roca (R)	$26,926 (Note: $761 of this total was self-funded by Roca)	$26,400	$526
Source: Federal Election Commission

==== Results ====
Results by county Ficker: 30–40%; 40–50%; 50–60%; Burnett: 40–50%

Republican primary results
Party	Candidate	Votes	%
**Republican**	**Robin Ficker**	**16,284**	**41.8**
Republican	Chris Burnett	14,562	37.4
Republican	Mariela Roca	8,115	20.8
Total votes		**38,961**	**100.0**

=== Independent and third-party candidates ===
==== Candidates ====
===== Declared =====
- Moshe Landman (Green), attorney, mortgage broker, and nominee for SD-39 in 2022

===== Withdrew =====
- Chris Hyser (Unaffiliated), retired state trooper and Republican candidate for this district in 2024
- Hajra Kirmani (Unaffiliated), real estate agent

=== General election ===
==== Predictions ====
Source	Ranking	As of
Decision Desk HQ	Safe D	September 24, 2026
The Cook Political Report	Solid D	February 6, 2025
Inside Elections	Solid D	March 7, 2025
Sabato's Crystal Ball	Safe D	March 26, 2026

==== Fundraising ====
Campaign finance reports as of October 14, 2026
Candidate	Raised	Spent	Cash on hand
April McClain Delaney (D)	$12,535,128 (Note: $11,000,000 of this total was self-funded by McClain Delaney)	$12,426,168	$121,839
Robin Ficker (R)	$1,284,599 (Note: $402,862 of this total was self-funded by Ficker)	$1,280,272	$4,328
Source: Federal Election Commission

==== Results ====
2026 Maryland's 6th congressional district election
Party	Candidate	Votes	%	±%
**Democratic**	**April McClain Delaney (incumbent)**	**165,031**	**59.32%**	**+6.27%**
Republican	Robin Ficker	104,682	37.63%	−9.09%
Green	Moshe Landman	7,786	2.80%	N/A
Write-in		687	0.25%	+0.02%
Total votes		**278,186**	**100.00%**	

== District 7 ==
2026 Maryland's 7th congressional district election
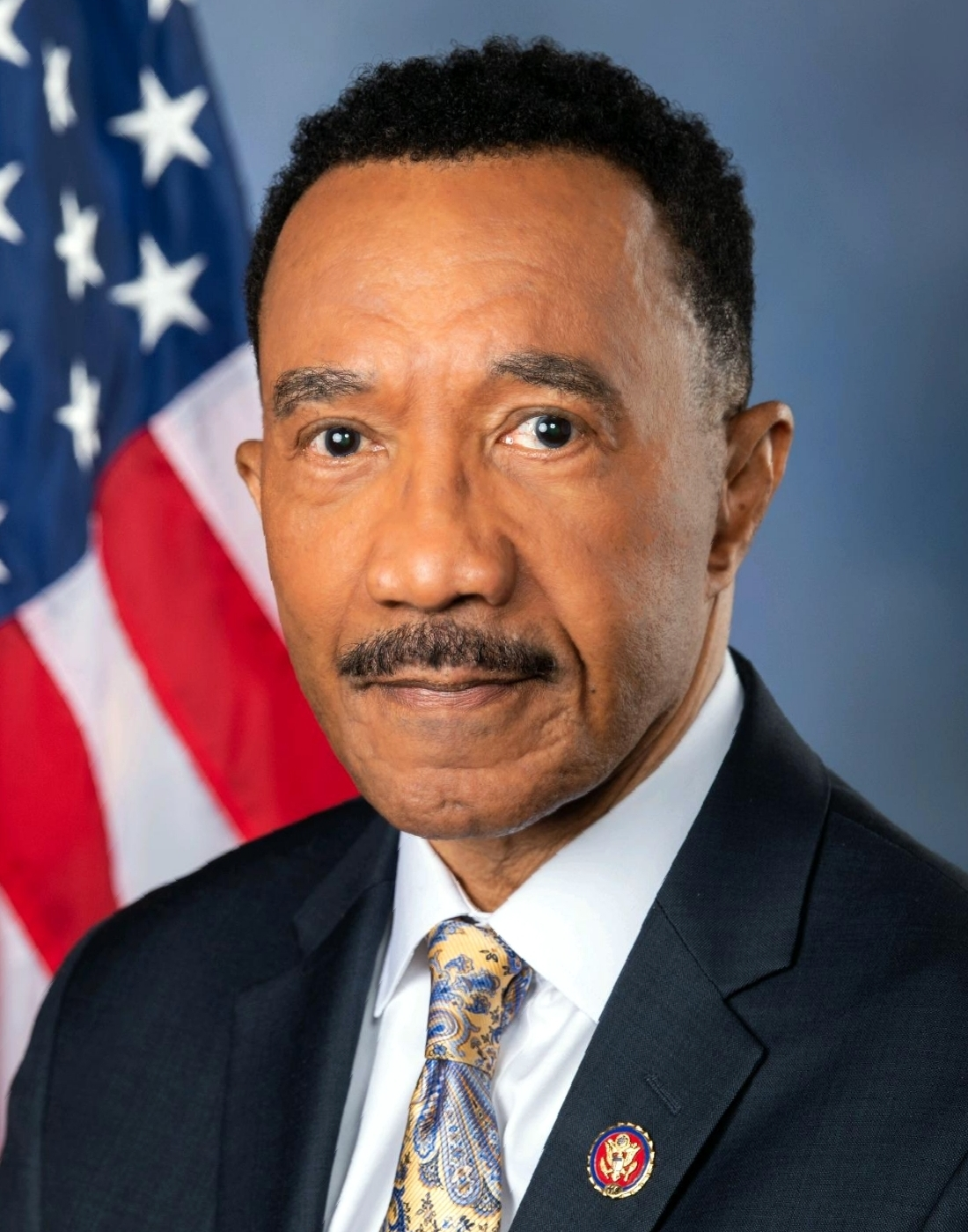

Nominee	Kweisi Mfume	Scott Collier
Party	Democratic	Republican
Popular vote	186,984	31,818
Percentage	85.1%	14.5%
- Mfume: 50–60% 50–60% 60–70% 70–80% 80–90% >90% Collier: 50–60% 60–70% 70–80%
U.S. Representative before election
Kweisi Mfume
Democratic
Elected U.S. Representative
Kweisi Mfume
Democratic

The 7th district includes most of Baltimore and some of its suburbs. The incumbent is Democrat Kweisi Mfume, who was re-elected with 80.3% of the vote in 2024.

=== Democratic primary ===
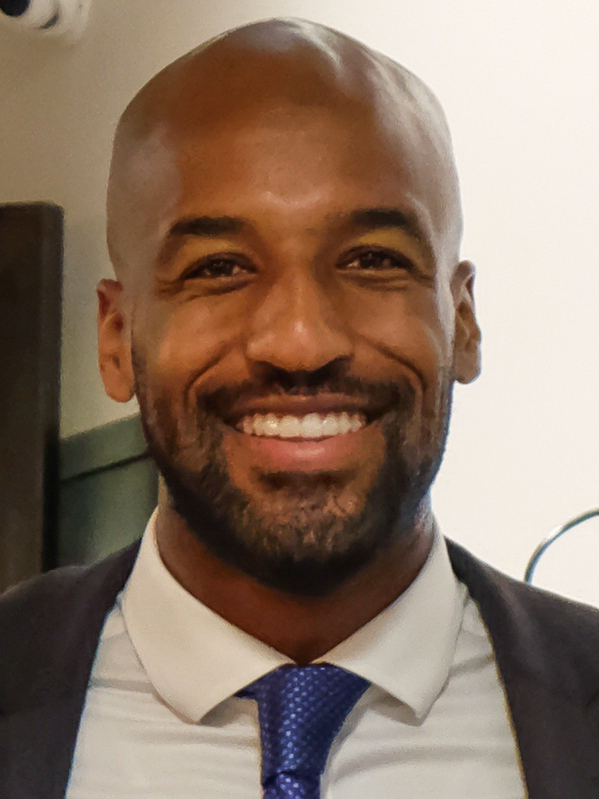
Mfume faced a primary challenge from Baltimore city councilor Mark Conway.

==== Candidates ====
===== Nominee =====
- Kweisi Mfume, incumbent U.S. representative

===== Eliminated in primary =====
- Mark Conway, Baltimore city councilor from the 4th district (2020–present)
- Tashi Davis, project manager and candidate for this district in 2022 and 2024
- Theo Gillespie, school bus driver

==== Endorsements ====
Endorsements in bold were made after the primary elections.

Mark Conway

Organizations

- Council on American–Islamic Relations Action
- Moms Demand Action (co-endorsed with Mfume)
- Peace Action
- Track AIPAC
Kweisi Mfume

Statewide officials

- Wes Moore, Maryland governor (2023–present)

Labor unions

- American Federation of Government Employees
- American Federation of State, County and Municipal Employees Council 3
- Maryland State & DC AFL-CIO
- National Education Association

Organizations

- AIPAC
- CASA in Action
- **Humane World Action Fund**
- J Street
- **League of Conservation Voters**
- Moms Demand Action (co-endorsed with Conway)
- Planned Parenthood Action Fund
- Sierra Club

Newspapers

- Baltimore Afro-American

==== Fundraising ====
Campaign finance reports as of June 30, 2026
Candidate	Raised	Spent	Cash on hand
Mark Conway (D)	$203,673	$191,083	$12,590
Kweisi Mfume (D)	$415,174	$406,290	$702,810
Source: Federal Election Commission

==== Results ====
Democratic primary results
Party	Candidate	Votes	%
**Democratic**	**Kweisi Mfume (incumbent)**	**57,793**	**70.1**
Democratic	Mark Conway	20,197	24.5
Democratic	Tashi Davis	2,904	3.5
Democratic	Theo Gillespie	1,573	1.9
Total votes		**82,467**	**100.0**

=== Republican primary ===
==== Candidates ====
===== Nominee =====
- Scott Collier, media entrepreneur, perennial candidate, and nominee for this district in 2022 and 2024

==== Results ====
Republican primary results
Party	Candidate	Votes	%
**Republican**	**Scott Collier**	**5,749**	**100.0**
Total votes		**5,749**	**100.0**

=== General election ===
==== Predictions ====
Source	Ranking	As of
Decision Desk HQ	Safe D	July 14, 2026
The Cook Political Report	Solid D	February 6, 2025
Inside Elections	Solid D	March 7, 2025
Sabato's Crystal Ball	Safe D	April 10, 2025

==== Fundraising ====
Campaign finance reports as of June 30, 2026
Candidate	Raised	Spent	Cash on hand
Kweisi Mfume (D)	$415,174	$406,290	$702,810
Source: Federal Election Commission

==== Results ====
2026 Maryland's 7th congressional district election
Party	Candidate	Votes	%	±%
**Democratic**	**Kweisi Mfume (incumbent)**	**186,984**	**85.12%**	**+4.87%**
Republican	Scott Collier	31,818	14.48%	−2.68%
Write-in		862	0.39%	+0.17%
Total votes		**219,664**	**100.00%**	

== District 8 ==
2026 Maryland's 8th congressional district election
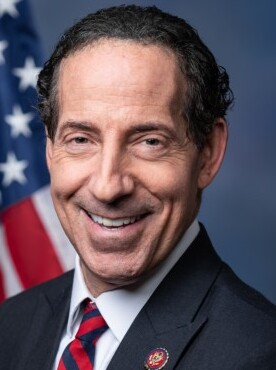

Nominee	Jamie Raskin	Cheryl Riley
Party	Democratic	Republican
Popular vote	229,736	40,848
Percentage	83.3%	14.8%
U.S. Representative before election
Jamie Raskin
Democratic
Elected U.S. Representative
Jamie Raskin
Democratic

The 8th district is based in Montgomery County and includes the county's innermost suburbs of Washington, D.C., such as Rockville, Silver Spring, and Bethesda. The incumbent is Democrat Jamie Raskin, who was re-elected with 76.8% of the vote in 2024.

=== Democratic primary ===
==== Candidates ====
===== Nominee =====
- Jamie Raskin, incumbent U.S. representative

===== Eliminated in primary =====
- J. D. Kumar, finance executive
- Stephen Leon, inventor

===== Withdrew =====
- Marc Lande, nursing assistant
- Boris Velasquez, national security analyst (remained on ballot)

==== Endorsements ====
Jamie Raskin

Statewide officials

- Wes Moore, Maryland governor (2023–present)

Labor unions

- Amalgamated Transit Union Local 689
- American Federation of Government Employees
- American Federation of State, County and Municipal Employees Council 3
- Association of Flight Attendants
- Maryland State & DC AFL-CIO
- National Education Association
- Service Employees International Union Local 500
- United Food and Commercial Workers Local 1994 MCGEO

Organizations

- Brady PAC
- Center for Freethought Equality PAC
- Council on American–Islamic Relations Action
- Giffords
- Humane World Action Fund
- Jewish Democratic Council of America
- Joint Action Committee for Political Affairs
- J Street
- League of Conservation Voters Action Fund
- Moms Demand Action
- Our Revolution
- Planned Parenthood Action Fund
- Progressive Democrats of America
- Reproductive Freedom for All
- Sierra Club

==== Fundraising ====
Campaign finance reports as of June 30, 2026
Candidate	Raised	Spent	Cash on hand
Stephen Leon (D) (Note: As last reported on June 30, 2026)	$4,214 (Note: $4,189 of this total was self-funded by Leon)	$4,741	$83
Jamie Raskin (D)	$7,425,389	$4,497,145	$7,893,447
Source: Federal Election Commission

==== Results ====
Democratic primary results
Party	Candidate	Votes	%
Democratic	Jamie Raskin (incumbent)	98,179	92.7
Democratic	Boris Velasquez (withdrawn)	2,767	2.6
Democratic	J. D. Kumar	2,538	2.4
Democratic	Stephen Alan Leon	2,453	2.3
Total votes		105,937	100.0

=== Republican primary ===
==== Candidates ====
===== Nominee =====
- Cheryl Riley, public relations consultant and nominee for this district in 2024

===== Eliminated in primary =====
- Anita Cox, nominee for SD-19 in 2022
- Donald Lech, Food and Drug Administration official
- Michael Yadeta, engineer and candidate for this district in 2020, 2022, and 2024

==== Fundraising ====
Campaign finance reports as of June 30, 2026
Candidate	Raised	Spent	Cash on hand
Anita Cox (R)	$11,916	$4,800	$7,116
Cheryl Riley (R)	$16,590	$15,372	$1,806
Source: Federal Election Commission

==== Results ====
Republican primary results
Party	Candidate	Votes	%
Republican	Cheryl Riley	3,495	43.3
Republican	Anita Cox	2,123	26.3
Republican	Donald Lech	1,376	17.0
Republican	Michael Yadeta	1,087	13.5
Total votes		8,081	100.0

=== Independent and third-party candidates ===
==== Candidates ====
===== Declared =====
- Nancy Wallace (Green), nominee for this district in 2016 and governor in 2022

=== General election ===
==== Predictions ====
Source	Ranking	As of
Decision Desk HQ	Safe D	July 14, 2026
The Cook Political Report	Solid D	February 6, 2025
Inside Elections	Solid D	March 7, 2025
Sabato's Crystal Ball	Safe D	April 10, 2025

==== Fundraising ====
Campaign finance reports as of June 30, 2026
Candidate	Raised	Spent	Cash on hand
Jamie Raskin (D)	$7,425,389	$4,497,145	$7,893,447
Cheryl Riley (R)	$16,590	$15,372	$1,806
Source: Federal Election Commission

==== Results ====
2026 Maryland's 8th congressional district election
Party	Candidate	Votes	%	±%
Democratic	Jamie Raskin (incumbent)			
Republican	Cheryl Riley			
Write-in				
Total votes				

== Notes ==
Partisan clients

== See also ==
- 2026 Maryland gubernatorial election
- 2026 Maryland Attorney General election
- 2026 Maryland Comptroller election
