= Sam Husseini =

Jordanian-Palestinian-American writer and political activist (born 1966)

- Born: Osama Husseini; 1966 (age 59–60)
- Education: Carnegie Mellon University
- Occupations: Writer, activist
- Years active: 1990–present
- Website: husseini.substack.com

Osama "Sam" Husseini (Arabic: أسامة الحسيني; born 1966) is an American journalist and political activist. He is the communications director of the Institute for Public Accuracy, a D.C.-based nonprofit group that promotes progressive experts as alternative sources for mainstream media reporters. He formerly worked at the American-Arab Anti-Discrimination Committee and at the media watch group Fairness and Accuracy in Reporting. Husseini has written articles for a variety of publications, including CounterPunch, The Nation, The Washington Post, USA Today and Salon. He is currently running for Congress in Maryland's 4th congressional district.

== Early life ==
Husseini was born as Osama Husseini in 1966 to a Palestinian Christian father from Tiberias, and a Jordanian Christian mother. His parents immigrated to the United States when he was five years old. Husseini grew up in Queens in New York City. He became a US citizen in 1984.

Husseini is a graduate of Carnegie Mellon University, where he earned a double bachelor's degree in applied mathematics and logic and computation.

== Career ==
Husseini questions Turki Al-Faisal, which resulted in Husseini being suspended by the National Press Club

After graduating, Husseini worked as a programmer and a math teacher. He then began working for Fairness and Accuracy in Reporting (FAIR) where he was the Middle East expert. After the 1993 World Trade Center bombing, he was in charge of monitoring news media for evidence of anti-Arab and anti-Muslim bias.

Husseini was the media director for the American-Arab Anti-Discrimination Committee.

After leaving FAIR, he became the communications director for the Institute for Public Accuracy, a position that he has held since 1997. In 2020, he was listed as a senior analyst for the Institute for Public Accuracy and a contributor to The Nation.

In 2000, he founded the website VotePact.org which encourages disenchanted Democrats to pair up with disenchanted Republicans and vote for third parties and independent candidates.

In 2006, Husseini founded the website WashingtonStakeout.com which features him pointedly questioning political figures as they leave Sunday morning talk shows.

In 2011, the executive director of the National Press Club suspended Husseini for asking questions of the Saudi ambassador to the US, Turki Al-Faisal, which were considered "loaded statements". The club's ethics committee later lifted the suspension. Husseini asked Prince al-Faisal, the former head of Saudi intelligence,

I want to know what legitimacy your regime has sir. You come before us, representative of one of the most autocratic, misogynistic regimes on the face of the earth. Human Rights Watch and other reports of torture detention of activists, you squelched the democratic uprising in Bahrain, you tried to overturn the democratic uprising in Egypt and indeed you continue to oppress your own people.

In 2018, Husseini was removed from the 2018 Russia–United States Summit press conference, prior to Trump and Putin's arrival in the room, when he held a sign saying "Nuclear Weapon Ban Treaty", which the Russian authorities called a "malicious item". A CBS News reporter stated that he had been "heckling" reporters and two security detail members. Husseini said he had hoped to ask Trump a question regarding the first legally binding Treaty on the Prohibition of Nuclear Weapons, with the goal of their total elimination.

On January 16, 2025, Husseini was physically removed from U.S. Secretary of State Antony Blinken's final press conference after interrupting Blinken's prepared remarks with questions about the United States' handling of the humanitarian crisis in Gaza and United States complicity in Israeli war crimes in the Israel–Hamas war. As Husseini was being removed, he shouted "Criminal! Why aren't you in The Hague?" (a reference to the International Criminal Court). Husseini reported afterward that he was "carried out and handcuffed", and that he felt that the security team had used "excessive force".

In July 2026, the Maryland Green Party elected Husseini as its nominee in Maryland's 4th congressional district for the 2026 election.

On July 27, 2026, Husseini was in attendance at a National Press Club news conference titled "Combating Corruption", held by consumer rights advocacy group Public Citizen, at which Senator Chuck Schumer was the group's featured speaker. Shortly after Schumer began speaking, he was interrupted when Husseini stood up from his seat in the front row to confront him. According to Russell Mokhiber, another reporter who was also in attendance, Husseini was holding a document from November 2023 titled "Legal Organizations Put Members of Congress on Notice of Complicity in Genocide" from the Center for Constitutional Rights, Palestine Legal, and the National Lawyers Guild. Schumer told Husseini "Please sit down", to which Husseini responded "What can be more corrupt than backing genocide?" and "You were put on notice, and you backed it. And you backed the genocide to the hilt for years on end. How dare you talk about corruption?" Schumer said "Thank you for your diatribe. Now let’s continue. The people didn’t come to hear you." Husseini was subsequently removed from the room by security as he told Schumer "It’s amazing that you can show your genocidal face in public", and "Shame on Public Citizen for not allowing questions of this genocidal maniac". Mokhiber, in writing about the event, described Schumer as "one of the most corrupt members of the United States Senate – known by his nickname – the Senator from Wall Street. Also known for taking hundreds of thousands of dollars in Israel lobby money and, in exchange, taking a leadership role in funding Israel’s mass murder and genocide in Gaza."

== Writing ==
Husseini has written frequently about U.S. media coverage of the Arab–Israeli conflict. In 1994, he argued that General Electric, as the parent company of NBC, should be ineligible to hold broadcast licenses, due to the corporation's many felony convictions, citing FCC guidelines.

Writing in Salon in 2020, Husseini suggested that the COVID-19 outbreak in Wuhan was possibly a result of a biowarfare laboratory discovering the virus in the wild, and studying it in a lab from which it escaped. He argued that the pandemic exposed the threat of a biowarfare arms race, which may lead to more pandemics in the future.
