= Alexis Goldstein =

American financial regulatory expert and political candidate

Personal details
- Born: January 4, 1981 (age 45)
- Party: Democratic
- Education: Columbia University (BS)
- Website: Campaign website

Alexis Goldstein (born January 4, 1981) is a former financial regulatory expert for the Consumer Financial Protection Bureau. She ran to represent Maryland's 6th congressional district in the 2026 election. She was eliminated in Democratic primary election.

== Early life ==
Goldstein was born on January 4, 1981. She graduated Magna Cum Laude from Columbia University with a degree in computer science.

Goldstein worked for 7 years on Wall Street as a programmer and analyst until quitting in 2010 to join the Occupy Wall Street protests. As she later wrote for n+1, "On Wall Street, everyone was my competitor. They'd help me only if it helped them. At Occupy Wall Street, I am offered food, warmth, and support, because it's the right thing to do, and because joy breeds joy."

== Career ==
Goldstein began working on financial regulatory policy, climate finance, consumer and investor protection, and higher education for Americans for Financial Reform, until in 2021 when she joined the Open Markets Institute as a Financial Policy Director. Goldstein testified to the Senate Banking Committee while in that role on the risks of stablecoins. During this time she was also an advisory board member for the Project on Predatory Student Lending at Harvard Law School.

Goldstein has been published widely, mostly writing op-eds on financial topics from a progressive perspective. For example, some of her writing has advocated for canceling student debt, ending usury payday loans, a wealth tax, and stricter bank regulations. Her writing has been featured in The New York Times, The Nation, The Guardian, Washington Post, Bloomberg, The Progressive, The American Prospect, and Truthout. Goldstein is also a frequent guest on news programs, including NPR, MSNBC, The Week, NBC News, CNBC, CNN, Democracy Now, The Daily Show, and HBO's Real Time with Bill Maher. She was also featured in PBS Frontline's "Money, Power, and Wall Street" documentary.

In 2021, Goldstein joined the Chief Technologist's Office at the Consumer Financial Protection Bureau as a program manager. Goldstein told WFED "The reason I joined government is it's the entity that can do the most good." While at the CFPB, Goldstein was a member of the National Treasury Employees Union.

=== Firing under the Trump administration ===
In early 2025, Department of Government Efficiency (DOGE) staff were at the Consumer Financial Protection Bureau (CFPB) headquarters. A disagreement between the DOGE staff and Goldstein ensued about whether the visitors, who were not wearing the proper badges, could be in the facility and access sensitive consumer information. Later that day Goldstein was placed on administrative leave.

In December 2025, CFPB management proposed firing Goldstein for "taking a vigilante approach" and "actions [that] put the Bureau off on the wrong foot with the new administration." On February 11, 2026, Goldstein was fired by the organization, one week before her contract would have ended anyway.

== 2026 congressional campaign ==
On February 18, 2026, Goldstein announced that she would run for the U.S. House of Representatives in Maryland's 6th congressional district as Democrat, challenging Democratic incumbent April McClain Delaney.

Goldstein is on the left, and has frequently criticized the excesses of Wall Street, and also insufficient action from Democrats on issues such as standing up to President Donald Trump and inequality, saying "housing and education are issues of inequality that have solutions, not just stump-speech lines or YouTube-ready complaints. And if Democrats have any hope left in the midterms, they cannot be this shamefully muted on bold progressive policies that could dramatically improve the lives of voters who just happen to hold the keys to a majority of the United States Senate." She has called for the overturning of Citizens United v. FEC.

Goldstein was eliminated in the Democratic primary, garnering 9.81% of the votes and placing third behind incumbent April McClain Delaney (44.00%) and David Trone (36.99%).

== Bibliography ==
=== Books ===
- Goldstein, Alexis (2012). "Learning CSS3 Animations and Transitions: A Hands-on Guide to Animating in CSS3 with Transforms, Transitions, Keyframes, and JavaScript." ISBN 978-0133064438.
- Goldstein, Alexis; Lazaris, Louis; Weyl, Estelle (2011). "HTML5 & CSS3 for the Real World." ISBN 978-0980846904.

=== Other publications ===
- Pierce, Michael; Goldstein, Alexis (December 2021). "Protecting Workers Against Predatory Employer Loans." Student Borrower Protection Center. https://papers.ssrn.com/sol3/papers.cfm?abstract_id=4305565
