= Track AIPAC =

American online project and advocacy platform

- Website type: Advocacy / Watchdog
- Available in: English
- Creators: Cory Archibald; Casey Kennedy
- Website: trackaipac.com
- Commercial: No
- Registration: Optional (newsletter)
- Launched: December 3, 2024 (Website)
- Current status: Active

Track AIPAC (also known as AIPAC Tracker on X) is an American online project and advocacy platform that documents and publishes information on the American Israel Public Affairs Committee (AIPAC) and related pro-Israel political spending and influence in United States politics.

It was established as a X account in April 2024 by Cory Archibald and Casey Kennedy. Archibald previously worked as a consultant for Cori Bush and Jamaal Bowman, and as the spokeswoman for Brand New Congress.

== History ==
Track AIPAC was established as a X account in April 2024 by Cory Archibald and Casey Kennedy. Archibald previously worked as a consultant for Cori Bush and Jamaal Bowman, and as the spokeswoman for Brand New Congress. Kennedy has cited the documentary series The Lobby in 2020 as the inspiration for Track AIPAC.

Prior to November 2025, Track AIPAC operated anonymously; that month, Archibald and Kennedy revealed themselves as its founders due to what they said were doxing threats by AIPAC. As of November 2025, Track AIPAC had endorsed around three dozen Senate and House candidates. By that point, it had almost 400,000 followers on X.

In December 2025, Kennedy stated he had been fired from his job after the pro-Israel group StopAntisemitism posted his employer on X. In February 2026, Instagram suspended Track AIPAC's account, but it was later restored.

== Activities ==
Track AIPAC tracks political donations by organizations that are part of the Israel lobby in the United States, including AIPAC, Democratic Majority for Israel (DMFI), the Republican Jewish Coalition (RJC) and J Street. In 2026, Track AIPAC launched a public advertising campaign highlighting AIPAC donations in the 2026 United States congressional elections.

Archibald and Kennedy have stated Track AIPAC's aim is to make working with AIPAC a political liability, and that they will endorse candidates who commit to rejecting donations from the Israel lobby, supporting Palestinian statehood, enforcing the Leahy Law and overturning Citizens United.

Kennedy said in November 2025, "Our next target is the big oil lobby." Archibald and Kennedy have launched Track Oil PACs, a related initiative that tracks political donations from oil companies.

In September 2026, Track AIPAC signed onto #DropTheGenocide20, a campaign aiming to hold accountable 20 Biden administration officials who it says are the "most responsible for promoting, lying about, and covering up the Gaza genocide." Said officials include Antony Blinken, Jake Sullivan, Brett McGurk and Jon Finer, among others.

=== Methodology ===
Track AIPAC uses red cards to indicate politicians who have received donations from the Israel lobby or hold pro-Israel positions, and green cards for politicians it endorses.

Track AIPAC initially relied on Federal Election Commission (FEC) data compiled by OpenSecrets. In 2025, it started analysing the FEC data itself, and included individual expenditures and money spent on campaign advertising. In 2026, Track AIPAC started including bundlers and major donors to the Israel lobby who are donating directly to political candidates in its graphics, tracking money "spent by the pro-Israel lobby groups and their donors", meaning that they counted any money from donors or organizations that also donated to pro-Israel lobbying groups, controversially including J Street. Kennedy told The Intercept that Track AIPAC's tracking of pro-Israel spending is "as broad as possible, and that's by design. We want to provide the most encapsulating picture that we can of who's giving to the lobby and where they're giving to."

Track AIPAC is planning to modify its cards in response to criticism, by including additional information in their anti-endorsement red cards such as politicians' policy positions on Israel and Palestine and which pro-Israel groups or donors they have received donations from. In April 2026, Track AIPAC announced it would be reverting to the methodology it started using in 2025, in which only direct donations from the Israel lobby were included in its figures.

Track AIPAC also tracks politicians' voting records with regards to the Israeli–Palestinian conflict, such as progressive politician Jasmine Crockett, who Track AIPAC says "has a poor legislative record on Israel-Palestine issues". As of March 2026, it is working on a questionnaire to allow politicians to get their cards changed if they make policy commitments such as supporting an arms embargo on Israel and opposing anti-BDS laws or laws promoting the IHRA definition of antisemitism, which has been criticized for conflating criticism of Israel with antisemitism.

=== Citizens Against AIPAC Corruption ===
Citizens Against AIPAC Corruption (CAAC) is a political action committee founded by Archibald and Kennedy in 2024. It acts as Track AIPAC's campaign arm. That year, it spent $14,000 against Debbie Wasserman Schultz.

In 2026, CAAC told the Jewish Telegraphic Agency that it is "actively fundraising and willing to spend as much as we can raise seeking strategic victories". It requires its candidates to recognize the Gaza genocide, support recognition of Palestine as a state by the United Nations and oppose policies that conflate criticism of the Israeli government with antisemitism. CAAC, together with the political action committees PAL PAC and American Priorities, aim to elect pro-Palestinian candidates amid waning support for Israel among Americans.

== Positions ==
Track AIPAC has argued that pro-Israel politicians who accept donations from AIPAC are "Israel First traitor[s] to America", and that AIPAC should register as a foreign agent. Track AIPAC has stated Israel is an "evil, malignant force that seeks the destruction" of the Gaza Strip, the West Bank and its neighboring countries, and that it "should simply not exist" if it cannot survive "without US foreign aid", which it characterizes as "forced donations from the citizens of the United States".

In March 2025, Track AIPAC called on its followers to boycott the 2025 Snow White film due to the involvement of Gal Gadot, who had previously served in the Israel Defense Forces (IDF). Track AIPAC has denounced Itay Chen, an Israeli-American IDF soldier who was taken prisoner by Hamas and later killed, for "volunteer[ing] to move overseas... to partake in ethnic cleansing and genocide" and characterized allegations of rape by Hamas in the October 7 attacks as "debunked rape propaganda from the Israel lobby" in October 2024.

== Reception ==
In December 2025, David Frank, a professor of communication at the University of Oregon, said, "AIPAC is on the ropes. It's being defeated and losing its hold on the American public. The Track AIPAC is grassroots in identifying how powerful AIPAC is. The founders wanted to show how much money is going to each member of Congress. They want to make the money toxic, so that even the recipients of smaller donations will want to return the money." That month, The Nation included Track AIPAC in its list of "Progressives Fighting for Our Democracy". Krystal Ball has credited Track AIPAC with making AIPAC "a lightning rod in American politics" and convincing centrist Democratic Party politicians to reject donations from AIPAC. In 2026, AIPAC ended direct PAC contributions and endorsements for political candidates, a move ahead of the 2026 United States elections that may have been the result of backlash against its support of the Gaza war and the 2026 Iran war.

In March 2026, Jacob Kornbluh of The Forward argued that Track AIPAC's presentation of Israel lobby donations in its graphics is misleading, and characterized it as "just one attempt to lump together all campaign funding groups that recognize Israel's right to exist and the candidates they support as targets for defeat in this year's primary elections, no matter how critical they have been of the Israeli government. The tactic is aimed at voters in a party where support for Israel has collapsed, and risks obscuring where candidates stand on crucial questions as voters head to the polls." IfNotNow executive director Morriah Kaplan said, "The work tracker accounts do is important because AIPAC and other dark money lobbies are intentionally very difficult to track. Without understanding how TrackAIPAC defines 'pro-Israel', it's not as valuable a tool for transparency as it could be."

== See also ==
- Anti-Zionist America PAC
