= Jacob Kornbluh =

British-American journalist

- Occupation: Reporter
- Years active: 2008–present

Jacob Kornbluh is a British-American reporter. He covers events related to New York City as well as related to the Jewish community. He is especially known for his coverage of Jewish responses to the COVID-19 pandemic, particularly for NYC's Orthodox Jews.

== Personal life ==
Kornbluh was born on May 29. Kornbluh was raised in London's Belzer Hasidic neighborhood of Stamford Hill. The fifth of seven children, Kornbluh largely spoke Yiddish with his father, who was a local community activist and a writer. His mother was a wig-maker and chef. It was with her that Kornbluh spoke English. He attended a yeshiva in Israel at age 16 and moved to New York City four years later. After moving to New York City, Kornbluh worked at a deli counter and hardware store. He later owned a pizza shop while blogging and doing videography on the side.

Kornbluh has lived in the Borough Park neighborhood of New York City since 1982 and is a Hasidic Jew.

== Journalism career ==
According to Kornbluh, he started blogging in 2008. During the 2013 New York City mayoral election, he started attending campaign events and covering them on his blog. During the race, Kornbluh posted a video of Democratic mayoral candidate Anthony D. Weiner engaged in a shouting match after having been insulted by another customer at a Borough Park bakery. This video went viral and was Kornbluh's first major exposure in broader media. The New York Times editorial board also highlighted a video of Rudy Giuliani taken by Kornbluh during the campaign.

He was then hired as a politics reporter for Yeshiva World News, an Orthodox Jewish website. He moved to the website JP Updates, then joined Jewish Insider in 2015. In January 2021, he left to join the Forward as Senior Political Correspondent. His beats were expected to include coverage of the early Biden administration, of local New York City elections, and of the results of Israel's upcoming national election.

=== COVID-19 pandemic in Brooklyn ===
Kornbluh produced considerable reportage on the reaction of the New York Orthodox Jewish community's reactions to the COVID-19 pandemic. This included coverage of the refusal of some parts of this community to follow public health guidelines such as social distancing and masking. This led to attacks against Kornbluh.

On October 8, 2020, Kornbluh attended and covered the second day of a Brooklyn, New York protest where members of the Orthodox Jewish community expressed opposition to new COVID-19 restrictions. Minor fires were set, masks were burned, and Kornbluh was attacked. Heshy Tischler, an anti-lockdown radio host, told protesters to yell at Kornbluh. Tischler was taken into custody for inciting a riot against Kornbluh. After Tischler's arrest that Sunday, a group of young men arrived at Kornbluh's home. They shouted, calling Kornbluh a snitch and an informer. They stood on Kornbluh's doorstep, a line of police officers keeping them away from the house.

On the next day, Monday, Jewish Democratic Council of America executive director Halie Soifer and Republican Jewish Coalition head Matt Brooks issued a joint statement condemning the attacks on Kornbluh. In 2021, Tischler pled guilty to inciting a riot for the event and sentenced to ten days of community service. The Brooklyn District Attorney requested an order of protection for Kornbluh. In February 2023, Kornbluh appeared on Tischler radio show, where the two sparred over politics. Tischler apologized on air and said that to the New York Jewish Week that he was pleased to have Kornbluh as a guest and that the two had "made peace" in the eyes of their Orthodox community.

Kornbluh is well-known for his use of Twitter in his reportage and was included in the Jewish Telegraphic Agency's list of 50 Jewish Twitter users in 2018 and 2019.
