= Institute for Public Accuracy =

U.S. nonprofit organization

The Institute for Public Accuracy is a Washington, D.C.-based nonprofit organization that encourages mainstream media outlets to interview progressive scholars and policy analysts. It was founded in 1997 by Norman Solomon, who served as executive director until 2010. Its communications director is Sam Husseini, who was suspended by the National Press Club for asking a Saudi official what was perceived as a loaded question, although the club later reversed its decision.

In 2001, Scott Ritter was sponsored by the Institute to go to Baghdad to make a film about it. In 2002, the organization hosted actor Sean Penn on a tour of Iraq. The organization publishes ExposeFacts.org, which conducts campaigns aimed at encouraging corporate whistleblowers “to shed light on concealed activities that are relevant to human rights, corporate malfeasance, the environment, civil liberties and war.”

== See also ==
- Fairness and Accuracy in Reporting
